= Equestrian at the 1992 Summer Olympics – Team eventing =

Team eventing at the Games of the XXV Olympiad
- Venue: Club Hípic El Montanyà; Real Club de Polo de Barcelona
- Date: 28–30 July
- Competitors: 72 from 18 nations

Medalists
1st place, gold medalist(s)		David Green; Gillian Rolton; Andrew Hoy; Matthew Ryan	Australia
2nd place, silver medalist(s)		Blyth Tait; Andrew Nicholson; Mark Todd; Victoria Latta	New Zealand
3rd place, bronze medalist(s)		Herbert Blöcker; Ralf Ehrenbrink; Matthias Baumann; Cord Mysegages	Germany

The team eventing competition was one of six equestrian events on the Equestrian at the 1992 Summer Olympics programme. Dressage and endurance portions of the competition were held at the Club Hípic El Montanyà, the stadium jumping stage was held at Real Club de Polo de Barcelona. The scores of the top three rider/horse pairs for each nation in the individual event were summed to give a team score.

The competition was split into three phases:

1. Dressage (28 July)
  Riders performed the dressage test.
2. Endurance (29 July)
  Riders tackled roads and tracks, steeplechase and cross-country portions.
3. Jumping (30 July)
  Riders jumped at the show jumping course.

== Results ==
Rank	Nation	Individual results						Team score
Rank	Nation	Rider	Horse	Dressage	Endurance	Jumping	Total	Team score
1st place, gold medalist(s)	Australia	Matthew Ryan	Kibah Tic Toc	57.80	7.20	5.00	70.00	288.60
1st place, gold medalist(s)	Australia	Andrew Hoy	Kiwi	58.80	25.60	5.00	89.40	288.60
1st place, gold medalist(s)	Australia	Gillian Rolton	Peppermint Grove	64.20	60.00	5.00	129.20	288.60
1st place, gold medalist(s)	Australia	David Green	Duncan II	56.20	DNF	EL	EL	288.60
2nd place, silver medalist(s)	New Zealand	Blyth Tait	Messiah	78.80	8.80	0.00	87.60	290.80
2nd place, silver medalist(s)	New Zealand	Victoria Latta	Chief	58.00	24.80	5.00	87.80	290.80
2nd place, silver medalist(s)	New Zealand	Andrew Nicholson	Spinning Rhombus	61.20	9.20	45.00	115.40	290.80
2nd place, silver medalist(s)	New Zealand	Mark Todd	Welton Greylag	47.40	DNF	EL	EL	290.80
3rd place, bronze medalist(s)	Germany	Herbert Blöcker	Feine Dame	52.20	27.60	1.50	81.30	300.30
3rd place, bronze medalist(s)	Germany	Ralf Ehrenbrink	Kildare	62.80	40.80	5.00	108.60	300.30
3rd place, bronze medalist(s)	Germany	Cord Mysegaes	Ricardo	52.00	48.40	10.00	110.40	300.30
3rd place, bronze medalist(s)	Germany	Matthias Baumann	Alabaster	43.80	93.60	20.00	~~157.40~~	300.30
4	Belgium	Karin Donckers	Britt	75.40	24.00	5.00	104.40	333.05
4	Belgium	Jef Desmedt	Dolleman	64.60	38.80	5.00	108.40	333.05
4	Belgium	Willy Sneyers	Drum	51.60	48.40	20.25	120.25	333.05
4	Belgium	Dirk Van Der Elst	Fatal Love	74.80	81.60	10.00	~~166.40~~	333.05
5	Spain	Luis Álvarez de Cervera	Mr. Chrisalis	65.00	37.20	0.00	102.20	388.80
5	Spain	Santiago de la Rocha	Kinvarra	64.60	42.80	15.00	122.40	388.80
5	Spain	Fernando Villalón	Clever Night	71.40	82.80	10.00	164.20	388.80
5	Spain	Santiago Centenera	Just Dixon	62.60	EL	EL	EL	388.80
6	Great Britain	Karen Straker	Get Smart	44.60	42.80	5.00	92.40	406.60
6	Great Britain	Mary Thomson	King William	47.20	33.20	25.00	105.40	406.60
6	Great Britain	Richard Walker	Jacana	58.00	150.80	0.00	208.80	406.60
6	Great Britain	Ian Stark	Murphy Himself	44.20	36.40	DNS	EL	406.60
7	Japan	Yoshihiko Kowata	Hell At Dawn	75.00	50.80	10.00	135.80	434.80
7	Japan	Eiki Miyazaki	Mystery Cargo	70.20	47.60	20.00	137.80	434.80
7	Japan	Kojiro Goto	Retalic	67.80	78.40	15.00	161.20	434.80
7	Japan	Kazuhiro Iwatani	Lord Waterford	61.20	82.00	20.00	~~163.20~~	434.80
8	Ireland	Eric Smiley	Enterprise	64.60	50.80	25.00	140.40	445.80
8	Ireland	Máiréad Curran	Watercolour	70.00	74.40	5.00	149.40	445.80
8	Ireland	Melanie Duff	Rathlin Roe	58.80	87.20	10.00	156.00	445.80
8	Ireland	Polly Holohan	Rusticus	63.00	91.20	10.00	~~164.20~~	445.80
9	Poland	Jacek Krukowski	Ibis	73.40	74.00	10.00	157.40	494.40
9	Poland	Piotr Piasecki	Igrek	92.00	51.60	15.00	158.60	494.40
9	Poland	Bogusław Jarecki	Fant	65.20	73.20	40.00	178.40	494.40
9	Poland	Arkadiusz Bachur	Chutor	66.00	107.60	25.00	~~198.60~~	494.40
10	United States	Jil Walton	Patrona	63.20	43.60	10.00	116.80	515.20
10	United States	Michael Plumb	Adonis	49.60	135.60	10.00	195.20	515.20
10	United States	Stephen Bradley	Sassy Reason	65.20	128.00	10.00	203.20	515.20
10	United States	Todd Trewin	Sandscript	67.80	87.20	EL	EL	515.20
11	Sweden	Peder Fredricson	Hilly Trip	88.60	22.40	0.00	111.00	524.05
11	Sweden	Anna Hermann	Malacky	51.80	116.80	10.00	178.60	524.05
11	Sweden	Erik Duvander	Saucy Gift	58.80	164.40	11.25	234.45	524.05
11	Sweden	Staffan Lidbeck	Bernhardino	61.60	52.80	DNS	EL	524.05
12	Canada	Robert Stevenson	Risky Business	60.80	48.40	20.00	129.20	529.60
12	Canada	Rachel Hunter	King Plantagenet	80.20	101.60	15.00	196.80	529.60
12	Canada	Nick Holmes-Smith	Sir Lancelot	97.20	128.40	10.00	203.60	529.60
12	Canada	Stuart Young-Black	Von Perrier	54.80	66.80	DNS	EL	529.60
13	Italy	Lara Villata	Day Light	54.60	68.40	10.00	133.00	534.65
13	Italy	Federico Roman	Noriac	63.20	102.00	25.00	190.20	534.65
13	Italy	Francesco Girardi	Stormy Weather	72.40	112.80	26.25	211.45	534.65
13	Italy	Fabio Magni	Passport	62.80	DNF	EL	EL	534.65
14	France	Marie-Christine Duroy	Quart du Placineau	48.20	56.40	5.25	109.85	590.05
14	France	Michel Bouguet	Newport AA	49.80	78.40	17.00	145.20	590.05
14	France	Jean-Jacques Boisson	Oscar de la Loge	64.80	265.20	5.00	335.00	590.05
14	France	Didier Seguret	Coeur de Rocker	66.20	DNF	EL	EL	590.05
15	Portugal	Vasco Ramires Jr.	Bahone	91.40	82.40	0.00	173.80	599.10
15	Portugal	Antonio Ramos	Carioca	72.40	102.80	11.50	186.70	599.10
15	Portugal	António Bráz	Friends Forever	85.00	143.60	10.00	238.60	599.10
15	Portugal	Alberto Rodrigues	Papiza Jac	69.80	EL	EL	EL	599.10
–	Netherlands	Martin Lips	Olympic Writzmark	63.20	50.80	0.00	114.00	EL
–	Netherlands	Fiona van Tuyll	Olympic Bronze	57.60	97.20	26.00	180.80	EL
–	Netherlands	Eddy Stibbe	Olympic Bahlua	66.80	167.60	DNS	EL	EL
–	Netherlands	Anchela Rohof	Capo di Capo	62.80	DNF	EL	EL	EL
–	Hungary	Attila Soós Jr.	Zsizsik	87.80	64.80	0.00	152.60	EL
–	Hungary	Tibor Herczegfalvy	Lump	85.20	113.40	10.00	208.60	EL
–	Hungary	Zsolt Bubán	Hofeherke	74.60	153.60	DNS	EL	EL
–	Hungary	Attila Ling	Hamupipoke	71.80	DNF	EL	EL	EL
–	Unified Team	Vasiliu Tanas	Darnik	81.00	115.20	5.00	201.20	EL
–	Unified Team	Mikhail Rybak	Ribachy	70.40	377.40	20.00	467.80	EL
–	Unified Team	Sandro Chikhladze	Glad	72.60	41.20	DNS	EL	EL
–	Unified Team	Oleg Karpov	Dokaz	81.20	DNF	EL	EL	EL
