= Equestrian at the 1992 Summer Olympics – Individual eventing =

Equestrian at the Olympics

Individual eventing at the Games of the XXV Olympiad
- Venue: Club Hípic El Montanyà; Real Club de Polo de Barcelona
- Date: 28–30 July
- Competitors: 82 from 25 nations

Medalists
1st place, gold medalist(s)		Matthew Ryan	Australia
2nd place, silver medalist(s)		Herbert Blöcker	Germany
3rd place, bronze medalist(s)		Blyth Tait	New Zealand

The individual eventing competition was one of six equestrian events on the Equestrian at the 1992 Summer Olympics programme. Dressage and endurance portions of the competition were held at the Club Hípic El Montanyà, the stadium jumping stage was held at Real Club de Polo de Barcelona.

The competition was split into three phases:

1. Dressage (28 July)
  Riders performed the dressage test.
2. Endurance (29 July)
  Riders tackled roads and tracks, steeplechase and cross-country portions.
3. Jumping (30 July)
  Riders jumped at the show jumping course.

== Results ==
Rank	Rider	Horse	Nationality	Dressage	Rank	Endurance	Rank	After Endurance	Rank	Jumping	Rank	Total
1st place, gold medalist(s)	Matthew Ryan	Kibah Tic Toc	Australia	57.80	18	7.20	1	65.00	1	5.00	9	70.00
2nd place, silver medalist(s)	Herbert Blöcker	Feine Dame	Germany	52.20	13	27.60	8	79.80	3	1.50	8	81.30
3rd place, bronze medalist(s)	Blyth Tait	Messiah	New Zealand	78.80	70	8.80	2	87.60	9	0.00	1	87.60
4	Victoria Latta	Chief	New Zealand	58.00	19	24.80	6	82.80	6	5.00	9	87.80
5	Andrew Hoy	Kiwi	Australia	58.80	23	25.60	7	84.40	7	5.00	9	89.40
6	Karen Straker	Get Smart	Great Britain	44.60	3	42.80	16	87.40	8	5.00	9	92.40
7	Luis Álvarez de Cervera	Mr. Chrisalis	Spain	65.00	43	37.20	12	102.20	13	0.00	1	102.20
8	Karin Donckers	Britt	Belgium	75.40	69	24.00	5	99.40	10	5.00	9	104.40
9	Mary Thomson	King William	Great Britain	47.20	4	33.20	9	80.40	4	25.00	55	105.40
10	Jef Desmedt	Dolleman	Belgium	64.60	39	38.80	13	103.40	14	5.00	9	108.40
11	Ralf Ehrenbrink	Kildare	Germany	62.80	31	40.80	14	103.60	15	5.00	9	108.60
12	Marie-Christine Duroy	Quart du Placineau	France	48.20	6	56.40	30	104.60	16	5.25	22	109.85
13	Cord Mysegaes	Ricardo	Germany	52.00	12	48.40	20	100.40	12	10.00	24	110.40
14	Peder Fredricson	Hilly Trip	Sweden	88.60	78	22.40	4	111.00	21	0.00	1	111.00
15	Martin Lips	Olympic Writzmark	Netherlands	63.20	35	50.80	24	114.00	24	0.00	1	114.00
16	Andrew Nicholson	Spinning Rhombus	New Zealand	61.20	27	9.20	3	70.40	2	45.00	62	115.40
17	Jil Walton	Patrona	United States	63.20	35	43.60	18	106.80	17	10.00	24	116.80
18	Willy Sneyers	Drum	Belgium	51.60	10	48.40	20	100.00	11	20.25	53	120.25
19	Santiago de la Rocha	Kinvarra	Spain	64.60	39	42.80	16	107.40	18	15.00	42	122.40
20	Choi Myeong-jin	Peppermint	South Korea	58.60	22	49.20	23	107.80	19	16.50	46	124.30
21	Nils Haagensen	Discovery	Denmark	48.80	7	71.20	35	120.00	28	6.00	23	126.00
22	Robert Stevenson	Risky Business	Canada	60.80	26	48.40	20	109.20	20	20.00	48	129.20
23	Gillian Rolton	Peppermint Grove	Australia	64.20	38	60.00	31	124.20	31	5.00	9	129.20
24	Lara Villata	Day Light	Italy	54.60	14	68.40	34	123.00	30	10.00	24	133.00
25	Yoshihiko Kowata	Hell At Dawn	Japan	75.00	68	50.80	24	125.80	32	10.00	24	135.80
26	Eiki Miyazaki	Mystery Cargo	Japan	70.20	57	47.60	19	117.80	27	20.00	48	137.80
27	Eric Smiley	Enterprise	Ireland	64.60	39	50.80	24	115.40	26	25.00	55	140.40
28	Michel Bouguet	Newport AA	France	49.80	9	78.40	39	128.20	33	17.00	47	145.20
29	Máiréad Curran	Watercolour	Ireland	70.00	56	74.40	38	144.40	39	5.00	9	149.40
30	David Rissik	Schiroubles	South Africa	93.00	81	36.80	11	129.80	34	20.25	53	150.05
31	Attila Soós Jr.	Zsizsik	Hungary	87.80	77	64.80	32	152.60	43	0.00	1	152.60
32	Melanie Duff	Rathlin Roe	Ireland	58.80	23	87.20	45	146.00	40	10.00	24	156.00
33	Jacek Krukowski	Ibis	Poland	73.40	65	74.00	37	147.40	42	10.00	24	157.40
34	Matthias Baumann	Alabaster	Germany	43.80	1	93.60	48	137.40	35	20.00	48	157.40
35	Piotr Piasecki	Igrek	Poland	92.00	80	51.60	27	143.60	38	15.00	42	158.60
36	Kojiro Goto	Retalic	Japan	67.80	52	78.40	39	146.20	41	15.00	42	161.20
37	Kazuhiro Iwatani	Lord Waterford	Japan	61.20	27	82.00	42	143.20	37	20.00	48	163.20
38	Fernando Villalón	Clever Night	Spain	71.40	60	82.80	44	154.20	44	10.00	24	164.20
39	Polly Holohan	Rusticus	Ireland	63.00	34	91.20	47	154.20	44	10.00	24	164.20
40	Dirk Van Der Elst	Fatal Love	Belgium	74.80	67	81.60	41	156.40	48	10.00	24	166.40
41	Vasco Ramires Jr.	Bahone	Portugal	91.40	79	82.40	43	173.80	52	0.00	1	173.80
42	Bogusław Jarecki	Fant	Poland	65.20	44	73.20	36	138.40	36	40.00	61	178.40
43	Anna Hermann	Malacky	Sweden	51.80	11	116.80	58	168.60	50	10.00	24	178.60
44	Fiona van Tuyll	Olympic Bronze	Netherlands	57.60	17	97.20	49	154.80	46	26.00	59	180.80
45	Nicki DeSousa	Prairie King	Bermuda	68.20	54	107.60	53	175.80	54	10.00	24	185.80
46	Antonio Ramos	Carioca	Portugal	72.40	62	102.80	52	175.20	53	11.50	41	186.70
47	Federico Roman	Noriac	Italy	63.20	35	102.00	51	165.20	49	25.00	55	190.20
48	Michael Plumb	Adonis	United States	49.60	8	135.60	61	185.20	56	10.00	24	195.20
49	Rachel Hunter	King Plantagenet	Canada	80.20	71	101.60	50	181.80	55	15.00	42	196.80
50	Arkadiusz Bachur	Chutor	Poland	66.00	47	107.60	53	173.60	51	25.00	55	198.60
51	Vasiliu Tanas	Darnik	Unified Team	81.00	72	115.20	57	196.20	60	5.00	9	201.20
52	Stephen Bradley	Sassy Reason	United States	65.20	44	128.00	59	193.20	58	10.00	24	203.20
53	Nick Holmes-Smith	Sir Lancelot	Canada	97.20	49	128.40	60	193.60	59	10.00	24	203.60
54	Tibor Herczegfalvy	Lump	Hungary	85.20	76	113.40	56	198.60	61	10.00	24	208.60
55	Richard Walker	Jacana	Great Britain	58.00	19	150.80	63	208.80	62	0.00	1	208.80
56	Francesco Girardi	Stormy Weather	Italy	72.40	62	112.80	55	185.20	56	26.25	60	211.45
57	Erik Duvander	Saucy Gift	Sweden	58.80	23	164.40	66	223.20	63	11.25	40	234.45
58	António Bráz	Friends Forever	Portugal	85.00	75	143.60	62	228.60	65	10.00	24	238.60
59	Jaime Velásquez	Mary Lucas	Mexico	67.20	51	207.20	68	274.20	68	5.00	9	279.40
60	Luciano Drubi	Xilena	Brazil	82.20	74	240.80	69	323.00	69	5.00	9	328.00
61	Jean-Jacques Boisson	Oscar de la Loge	France	64.80	42	265.20	70	330.00	70	5.00	9	335.00
62	Mikhail Rybak	Ribachy	Unified Team	70.40	58	377.40	71	447.80	71	20.00	48	467.80
DNF	Todd Trewin	Sandscript	United States	67.80	52	87.20	45	155.00	47	Eliminated		
DNF	Ian Stark	Murphy Himself	Great Britain	44.20	2	36.40	10	80.60	5	Withdrew		
DNF	Mary Jane Tumbridge	Bermuda's Option	Bermuda	58.40	21	55.20	29	113.60	22	Withdrew		
DNF	Sandro Chikhladze	Glad	Unified Team	72.60	64	41.20	15	113.80	23	Withdrew		
DNF	Staffan Lidbeck	Bernhardino	Sweden	61.60	29	52.80	28	114.40	25	Withdrew		
DNF	Stuart Young-Black	Von Perrier	Canada	54.80	15	66.80	33	121.60	29	Withdrew		
DNF	Zsolt Bubán	Hofeherke	Hungary	74.60	66	153.60	64	228.20	64	Withdrew		
DNF	Eddy Stibbe	Olympic Bahlua	Netherlands	66.80	49	167.60	67	234.40	66	Withdrew		
DNF	Antonio Alfaro	Paisana	Mexico	66.80	49	160.80	65	244.20	67	Withdrew		
DNF	Santiago Centenera	Just Dixon	Spain	62.60	30	Eliminated		did not advance				
DNF	Alberto Rodrigues	Papiza Jac	Portugal	69.80	55	Eliminated		did not advance				
DNF	Serguei Fofanoff	Kaiser Eden	Brazil	71.20	59	Eliminated		did not advance				
DNF	Ilian Iliev	Dinar	Bulgaria	95.00	82	Eliminated		did not advance				
DNF	Mark Todd	Welton Greylag	New Zealand	47.40	5	Retired		did not advance				
DNF	David Green	Duncan II	Australia	56.20	16	Retired		did not advance				
DNF	Anchela Rohof	Capo di Capo	Netherlands	62.80	31	Retired		did not advance				
DNF	Fabio Magni	Passport	Italy	62.80	31	Retired		did not advance				
DNF	Didier Seguret	Coeur de Rocker	France	66.20	48	Retired		did not advance				
DNF	Attila Ling	Hamupipoke	Hungary	71.80	61	Retired		did not advance				
DNF	Oleg Karpov	Dokaz	Unified Team	81.20	73	Retired		did not advance				
