= Equestrian at the 1992 Summer Olympics – Individual jumping =

Equestrian at the Olympics

Individual jumping at the Games of the XXV Olympiad
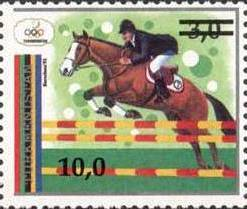
- Turkmenistan stamp commemorating 1992 Olympic equestrianism
- Venue: Real Club de Polo de Barcelona
- Dates: 4–9 August
- Competitors: 87 from 30 nations
- Winning total: 0 faults

Medalists
1st place, gold medalist(s)		Ludger Beerbaum; Germany
2nd place, silver medalist(s)		Piet Raymakers; Netherlands
3rd place, bronze medalist(s)		Norman Dello Joio; United States

The individual show jumping at the 1992 Summer Olympics took place between 4 and 9 August at the Real Club de Polo de Barcelona. The event was open to men and women. There were 87 competitors from 30 nations. Each nation could have up to 4 riders. The event was won by Ludger Beerbaum of Germany, the nation's second victory in individual jumping (tying the United States for third-most among nations behind France's four and Italy's three). It was the third consecutive Games at which Germany competed that the nation reached the podium in the event—gold in 1936 and bronze in 1952 (with no Games in 1940 or 1944, Germany disinvited in 1948, and either United Team of Germany or separate West Germany and East Germany teams competing from 1956 to 1988). Piet Raymakers earned the Netherlands' first medal in the event with his silver. The United States reached the podium for the third consecutive Games with Norman Dello Joio's bronze.

== Background ==
This was the 19th appearance of the event, which had first been held at the 1900 Summer Olympics and has been held at every Summer Olympics at which equestrian sports have been featured (that is, excluding 1896, 1904, and 1908). It is the oldest event on the current programme, the only one that was held in 1900. The team and individual events were interrelated for the first time since 1964.

Eight of the top 13 (including a six-way tie for 7th) riders from the 1988 Games returned: fourth-place finisher Anne Kursinski of the United States, sixth-place finisher Jaime Azcárraga of Mexico, and seventh-place finishers Jan Tops and Jos Lansink of the Netherlands, Nick Skelton of Great Britain, Franke Sloothaak of West Germany (now competing for united Germany), and Markus Fuchs and Thomas Fuchs of Switzerland. The reigning World Champion was Eric Navet of France.

Croatia, the Philippines, South Africa, and the Virgin Islands each made their debut in the event. Some former Soviet republics competed together as the Unified Team. France competed for the 17th time, most of any nation.

== Competition format ==
The competition underwent a significant format change for the second time in as many Games. For the first time since 1964, the team and individual events overlapped in the use of results. The format expanded to a total of five rounds, now using three rounds for the qualifying round and two rounds for the final. The first two qualifying rounds counted toward the team competition.

All riders competed in the first two qualifying rounds. The field was then cut to 56 riders (based on the combined score for the first two rounds) for the third qualifying round, with each nation limited to three riders advancing. The three-round total counted as the qualifying score. Half of the riders (44 of the 87) advanced to the final. Positive scoring was used for each of the qualifying rounds.

The final consisted of two rounds. Both rounds used the traditional fault scoring. Only the top 22 (half of the 44 finalists) riders advanced from the first round of the final to the second. The total of the two rounds was used for the final score. A jump-off would be used if necessary to break ties for medal positions; other ties would not be broken.

== Schedule ==
All times are Central European Summer Time (UTC+2)

Date	Time	Round
Tuesday, 4 August 1992	8:00; 15:00	Qualifying round 1 Qualifying round 2
Friday, 7 August 1992	9:30	Qualifying round 3
Sunday, 9 August 1992	9:30; 12:45	Final round 1 Final round 2

== Results ==
Martínez (Spain) and Robert (France) did not advance due to the three-rider limit per nation in the final.

Four riders cleared the first round of the final with no faults: Beerbaum, Raymakers, Dello Joio, and Whitaker. Whitaker had 19.25 faults in the second run. Dello Joio had 4.75 faults in the second run, the fourth-best result in that run to finish third overall (Tops, with 4 faults, had been better in the second run but finished fifth overall with 4.25 faults in the first resulting in a total of 8.25). Beerbaum and Raymakers both finished the second run without any obstacle faults, but Raymakers exceeded the time limit by 0.66 seconds resulting in a quarter-point fault. That timing fault was the difference between the two men as Beerbaum received gold and Raymakers silver.

Rank	Rider	Horse	Nation	Qualifying				Final		
Rank	Rider	Horse	Nation	Round 1	Round 2	Round 3	Total	Round 1	Round 2	Total
1st place, gold medalist(s)	Ludger Beerbaum	Classic Touch	Germany	82.50	83.00	—	165.50	0	0	0
2nd place, silver medalist(s)	Piet Raymakers	Ratina Z	Netherlands	82.50	72.50	—	155.00	0	0.25	0.25
3rd place, bronze medalist(s)	Norman Dello Joio	Irish	United States	42.00	56.00	65.50	163.50	0	4.75	4.75
4	Hervé Godignon	Quidam de Revel	France	62.00	84.50	—	146.50	1	5.25	6.25
5	Jan Tops	Top Gun	Netherlands	70.50	72.50	—	143.00	4	4.25	8.25
6	Maria Gretzer	Marcoville	Sweden	61.00	56.00	80.00	197.00	4.75	5.50	10.25
7	Ludo Philippaerts	Darco	Belgium	82.50	48.00	76.00	206.50	4	8.25	12.25
8	Merethe Jensen	Maxime	Denmark	60.00	81.00	74.50	215.50	4	8.75	12.75
9	Rodrigo Pessoa	Special Envoy	Brazil	82.50	56.00	84.50	223.00	4	12	16
10	Michael Matz	Heisman	United States	70.50	84.50	—	155.00	4	12.25	16.25
11	Éric Navet	Quito de Baussy	France	70.50	39.50	72.00	182.00	8	8.50	16.50
12	Markus Fuchs	Shandor II	Switzerland	56.00	72.50	74.50	203.00	8	9	17
13	Evelyne Blaton	Careful	Belgium	76.50	18.00	73.00	167.50	8	9	17
14	John Whitaker	Milton	Great Britain	82.50	72.50	—	155.00	0	19.25	19.25
15	Michael Whitaker	Monsanta	Great Britain	70.50	72.50	—	143.00	8	12	20
16	Thomas Fuchs	Dylano	Switzerland	70.50	72.50	—	143.00	8	12.75	20.75
17	Lisa Jacquin	For the Moment	United States	70.50	72.50	—	143.00	8	13.25	21.25
17	Jerry Smit	Governor	Italy	56.00	29.00	65.50	150.50	8	13.25	21.25
19	Luis Astolfi	Fino	Spain	70.50	84.50	—	155.00	4	21.50	25.50
20	Lesley McNaught-Mändli	Pirol B	Switzerland	70.50	72.50	—	143.00	4	EL	EL
21	Thomas Frühmann	Genius	Austria	82.50	84.50	—	167.00	8	DNF	EL
22	Luis Álvarez de Cervera	Let's Go	Spain	76.50	62.00	—	138.50	8	DNS	EL
23	Peter Eriksson	Moritz	Sweden	82.50	84.50	—	167.00	8.25	Did not advance	
24	Hugo Simon	Apricot D	Austria	82.50	72.50	—	155.00	8.50	Did not advance	
25	Juan Carlos García	Quel Type d'Elle	Colombia	20.00	61.00	63.00	144.00	9.50	Did not advance	
26	Jay Hayes	Zucarlos	Canada	56.00	56.00	82.00	194.00	12	Did not advance	
26	Jaime Guerra	Consul	Mexico	51.00	56.00	59.50	166.50	12	Did not advance	
26	Sören von Rönne	Taggi	Germany	56.00	72.50	87.00	215.50	12	Did not advance	
26	Enrique Sarasola Jr.	Minstrel	Spain	56.00	56.00	78.00	190.00	12	Did not advance	
30	James Kernan	Touchdown	Ireland	52.00	36.00	59.50	147.50	16	Did not advance	
30	Carlos da Motta	Wendy	Brazil	19.00	72.50	64.00	155.50	16	Did not advance	
30	Morten Aasen	Animo	Norway	42.00	72.50	46.00	160.50	16	Did not advance	
33	Hirokazu Higashira	Baltimore	Japan	42.00	33.50	61.50	137.00	17.50	Did not advance	
34	Mark Todd	Double Take	New Zealand	70.50	72.50	—	143.00	20	Did not advance	
35	Peter Gotz	Didi	South Africa	64.50	56.00	84.50	205.00	20.25	Did not advance	
36	Ulrika Hedin	Lipton	Sweden	30.50	56.00	51.00	137.50	20.50	Did not advance	
37	Valerio Sozzi	Pamina	Italy	63.00	43.00	61.50	167.50	24.25	Did not advance	
38	Takashi Tomura	Dorina	Japan	47.00	63.00	69.00	179.00	24.50	Did not advance	
39	Ryuzo Okuno	Milky Way	Japan	48.00	33.50	70.00	151.50	25.25	Did not advance	
40	Peter Charles	Kruger	Ireland	37.00	64.00	68.00	169.00	26	Did not advance	
41	Jennifer Foster	Zeus	Canada	70.50	50.50	71.00	192.00	28.75	Did not advance	
42	Jos Lansink	Egano	Netherlands	82.50	84.50	—	167.00	EL	Did not advance	
43	Tim Grubb	Denizen	Great Britain	49.50	50.50	81.00	181.00	DNF	Did not advance	
43	Hubert Bourdy	Razzia du Poncel	France	56.00	72.50	86.00	214.50	DNF	Did not advance	
45	Michel Robert	Nonix	France	82.50	19.00	78.00	179.50	Did not advance		
46	Cayetano Martínez	Palestro II	Spain	49.50	36.00	57.00	142.50	Did not advance		
47	Anatoly Timoshenko	Prints	Unified Team	24.00	32.00	78.00	134.00	Did not advance		
48	Harvey Wilson	Mayday	New Zealand	36.00	45.50	48.00	129.50	Did not advance		
49	Hirosuke Tomizawa	Don Carlos	Japan	26.00	36.00	67.00	129.00	Did not advance		
50	Otto Becker	Lucky Luke	Germany	22.50	48.00	57.00	127.50	Did not advance		
50	Vitor Teixeira	Attack Z	Brazil	34.00	44.00	49.50	127.50	Did not advance		
52	Jaime Azcárraga	Chin Chin	Mexico	42.00	29.00	52.50	123.50	Did not advance		
53	Giorgio Nuti	Gaugin	Italy	38.00	26.50	52.50	117.00	Did not advance		
54	Ian Millar	Big Ben	Canada	42.00	72.50	—	114.50	Did not advance		
55	Alberto Váldes Jr.	Pilatus	Mexico	17.00	42.00	55.00	114.00	Did not advance		
56	Jörg Münzner	Graf Grande	Austria	64.50	48.00	—	112.50	Did not advance		
57	Mun Eun-jin	Equador	South Korea	21.00	31.00	57.00	109.00	Did not advance		
58	Vilmos Göttler	Kemal 36	Hungary	42.00	14.00	44.00	100.00	Did not advance		
59	Bruce Goodin	Reservation	New Zealand	22.50	29.00	45.00	96.50	Did not advance		
60	André Salah Sakakini	Getaway	Egypt	27.00	12.00	54.00	93.00	Did not advance		
61	Willi Melliger	Quinta C	Switzerland	46.00	39.50	—	85.50	Did not advance		
62	Dirk Demeersman	Edelbert	Belgium	56.00	21.50	—	77.50	Did not advance		
63	Anne Kursinski	Cannonball	United States	—	72.50	—	72.50	Did not advance		
64	Manuel Torres	Kos	Colombia	8.00	13.00	49.50	70.50	Did not advance		
65	Nelson Pessoa Filho	Vivaldi	Brazil	28.00	39.50	—	67.50	Did not advance		
66	Henrik Lannér	Cantadou	Sweden	25.00	39.50	—	64.50	Did not advance		
67	Mun Hyeon-jin	French Rapture	South Korea	16.00	—	47.00	63.00	Did not advance		
68	Paul Darragh	Killelea	Ireland	42.00	16.00	—	58.00	Did not advance		
69	Charles Holzer	Manassas County	Virgin Islands	12.00	45.50	—	57.50	Did not advance		
70	Nick Skelton	Dollar Girl	Great Britain	—	56.00	—	56.00	Did not advance		
71	Gianni Govoni	Larry	Italy	30.50	24.00	—	54.50	Did not advance		
72	Hermann Weiland	Dufy 2	Croatia	30.50	21.50	—	52.00	Did not advance		
72	Franke Sloothaak	Prestige	Germany	30.50	21.50	—	52.00	Did not advance		
74	Bert Romp	Waldo E	Netherlands	33.00	15.00	—	48.00	Did not advance		
75	Eddie Macken	Welfenkrone	Ireland	13.00	26.50	—	39.50	Did not advance		
75	Jean-Claude Van Geenberghe	Queen of Diamonds	Belgium	18.00	21.50	—	39.50	Did not advance		
77	Denise Cojuangco	Nimmerdor	Philippines	11.00	25.00	—	36.00	Did not advance		
78	Lone Kroman Petersen	Qludy	Denmark	35.00	—	—	35.00	Did not advance		
79	Gonda Betrix	Tommy 29	South Africa	10.00	17.00	—	27.00	Did not advance		
80	Hugo Gamboa	Kung-Fu	Colombia	14.00	11.00	—	25.00	Did not advance		
81	Beth Underhill	Monopoly	Canada	15.00	—	—	15.00	Did not advance		
82	Kim Seung-hwan	Arizona	South Korea	9.00	—	—	9.00	Did not advance		
83	Yu Jeong-jae	Casual	South Korea	—	—	—	0.00	Did not advance		
83	José Maurer	America	Mexico	—	—	—	0.00	Did not advance		
83	Jorge Matias	Windus	Portugal	—	—	—	0.00	Did not advance		
83	Boris Boor	Love Me Tender	Austria	—	—	—	0.00	Did not advance		
83	Jiří Pecháček	Garta	Czechoslovakia	—	—	—	0.00	Did not advance		
