= Equestrian at the 1992 Summer Olympics – Team jumping =

Team jumping at the Games of the XXV Olympiad
- Venues: Real Club de Polo de Barcelona
- Dates: 4 August 1992
- Competitors: 74 from 19 nations

Medalists
1st place, gold medalist(s)		Piet Raijmakers, Bert Romp, Jan Tops, Jos Lansink	Netherlands
2nd place, silver medalist(s)		Boris Boor, Jörg Münzner, Hugo Simon, Thomas Frühmann	Austria
3rd place, bronze medalist(s)		Hervé Godignon, Hubert Bourdy, Michel Robert, Éric Navet	France

The team jumping event, part of the equestrian program at the 1992 Summer Olympics was held on 28 July and 9 August 1992 at the Royal Polo Club in Barcelona. The results of the second and third round of the individual jumping were used to award rankings. Like all other equestrian events, the competition was mixed gender, with both male and female athletes competing in the same division. Fourteen teams, each consisting of four horse and rider pairs, entered the contest.

== Results ==
Each team consisted of four pairs of horse and rider. The penalty points of the lowest three pairs were added together to reach the team's penalty points.

Rank	NOC	Rider	Horse	Scored	Total	Team Total	R1	Scored	Total	Team Total	R2	Total	Team Total
1st place, gold medalist(s)	Netherlands	Piet Raijmakers	Ratina Z	#	0.00	4.00	1	#	4.00	8.00	1	4.00	12.00
1st place, gold medalist(s)	Netherlands	Jos Lansink	Egano	#	0.00	4.00	1	#	0.00	8.00	1	0.00	12.00
1st place, gold medalist(s)	Netherlands	Bert Romp	Waldo E		14.50	4.00	1		25.75	8.00	1	40.25	12.00
1st place, gold medalist(s)	Netherlands	Jan Tops	Top Gun	#	4.00	4.00	1	#	4.00	8.00	1	8.00	12.00
2nd place, silver medalist(s)	Austria	Thomas Frühmann	Genius	#	0.00	4.25	2	#	0.00	12.50	4	0.00	16.75
2nd place, silver medalist(s)	Austria	Hugo Simon	Apricot D	#	0.00	4.25	2	#	4.00	12.50	4	4.00	16.75
2nd place, silver medalist(s)	Austria	Jörg Münzner	Graf Grande	#	4.25	4.25	2	#	8.50	12.50	4	12.75	16.75
2nd place, silver medalist(s)	Austria	Boris Boor	Love Me Tender		DNF	4.25	2		WD	12.50	4	DNF	16.75
3rd place, bronze medalist(s)	France	Herve Godignon	Quidam de Revel	#	4.75	8.75	3	#	0.00	16.00	6	4.75	24.75
3rd place, bronze medalist(s)	France	Hubert Bourdy	Razzina du Poncel		8.00	8.75	3	#	4.00	16.00	6	12.00	24.75
3rd place, bronze medalist(s)	France	Michel Robert	Nonix	#	0.00	8.75	3		20.25	16.00	6	20.25	24.75
3rd place, bronze medalist(s)	France	Eric Navet	Quito de Baussy	#	4.00	8.75	3	#	12.00	16.00	6	16.00	24.75
4	Spain	Cayetano Martínez	(horse)	#				#					
4	Spain	[[]]	(horse)										
4	Spain	[[]]	(horse)										
4	Spain	[[]]	(horse)										
5	Switzerland	[[]]	For Pleasure	#				#					
5	Switzerland	[[]]	Joly										
5	Switzerland	[[]]	Jus De Pommes	#									
5	Switzerland	[[]]	Ratina	#									
5	United States	Anne Kursinski	Eros	#				#					
5	United States	Leslie Burr-Howard	Extreme										
5	United States	Peter Leone	Legato										
5	United States	Michael Matz	Rhum										
7	Great Britain	Geoff Billington	It's Otto	#				#					
7	Great Britain	Nick Skelton	Show Time										
7	Great Britain	Michael Whitaker	Two Step										
7	Great Britain	John Whitaker	Welham										
8	Sweden	Malin Baryard	Corrmint	#				#					
8	Sweden	Maria Gretzer	Marcoville										
8	Sweden	Rolf-Goran Bengtsson	Paradiso										
8	Sweden	Peter Eriksson	Robin										
9	Canada	Jennifer Foster	Advantage	#				#					
9	Canada	Jay Hayes	Elute										
9	Canada	Ian Millar	Play It Again										
9	Canada	Beth Underhill	Silent Sam										
10	Brazil	Vitor Teixeira	Attack Z	#	14.00	30.75	13	#	9.00	21.00	10	23.00	51.75
10	Brazil	Carlos da Motta	Wendy		24.00	30.75	13	#	4.00	21.00	10	28.00	51.75
10	Brazil	Nelson Pessoa Filho	Vivaldi	#	16.75	30.75	13		12.00	21.00	10	28.75	51.75
10	Brazil	Rodrigo Pessoa	Special Envoy	#	0.00	30.75	13	#	8.00	21.00	10	8.00	51.75
11	Germany	Sören von Rönne	For Pleasure	#				#					
11	Germany	Franke Sloothaak	Joly										
11	Germany	Otto Becker	Jus De Pommes	#									
11	Germany	Ludger Beerbaum	Ratina	#									
12	Belgium	Ludo Philippaerts	Bon Ami	#				#					
12	Belgium	Evelyne Blaton	Mulga Bill										
12	Belgium	Dirk Demeersman	Revoulino										
12	Belgium	Jean-Claude Van Geenberghe	King Darko										
13	Japan	Takashi Tomura	Alcazar	#				#					
13	Japan	Ryuzo Okuno	Countryman										
13	Japan	Hirokazu Higashira	Sisal De Jalesnes										
13	Japan	Hirosuke Tomizawa	Vicomte Du Mesnil										
14	Ireland	James Kernan	Arthros	#				#					
14	Ireland	Peter Charles	Beneton										
14	Ireland	Paul Darragh	Diamond Exchange										
14	Ireland	Eddie Macken	Schalkhaar										
15	New Zealand	Mark Todd	For Pleasure	#				#					
15	New Zealand	Harvey Wilson	Joly										
15	New Zealand	Bruce Goodin	Jus De Pommes	#									
15	New Zealand	[[]]	Ratina	#									
16	Italy	Valerio Sozzi	For Pleasure	#				#					
16	Italy	Jerry Smit	Joly										
16	Italy	Giorgio Nuti	Jus De Pommes	#									
16	Italy	Gianni Govoni	Ratina	#									
17	Mexico	Jaime Guerra	Elastique	#				#					
17	Mexico	Jaime Azcárraga	Flash										
17	Mexico	Alberto Valdés Jr.	Genius										
17	Mexico	José Maurer	Risueno										
18	Colombia	Hugo Gamboa	For Pleasure	#				#					
18	Colombia	Juan Carlos García	Joly										
18	Colombia	Manuel Torres	Jus De Pommes	#									
18	Colombia	[[]]	Ratina	#									
AC	South Korea	Mun Eun-Jin	Equador	#	21.50	93.75	18	#	14.25	DNF	AC	35.75	DNF
AC	South Korea	Mun Hyeon-Jin	French Rapture	#	28.00	93.75	18	#	DNF	DNF	AC	DNF	DNF
AC	South Korea	Yu Jeong-Jae	Casual		DNF	93.75	18		DNS	DNF	AC	DNF	DNF
AC	South Korea	Kim Seung-Hwan	Arizona	#	44.25	93.75	18	#	DNF	DNF	AC	DNF	DNF

== Sources ==
Source: Official Report of the 1992 Barcelona Summer Olympics available at https://web.archive.org/web/20060622162855/http://www.la84foundation.org/5va/reports_frmst.htm
