= Ireland at the 1992 Summer Olympics =

- IOC code: IRL
- NOC: Olympic Federation of Ireland
- Website: olympics.ie

in Barcelona
- Competitors: 58 (49 men and 9 women) in 12 sports
- Flag bearer: Michelle Smith
- Medals Ranked 32nd: Gold 1 Silver 1 Bronze 0 Total 2

Summer Olympics appearances (overview)
- 1924; 1928; 1932; 1936; 1948; 1952; 1956; 1960; 1964; 1968; 1972; 1976; 1980; 1984; 1988; 1992; 1996; 2000; 2004; 2008; 2012; 2016; 2020; 2024

Other related appearances
- Great Britain (1896–1920)

Ireland competed at the 1992 Summer Olympics in Barcelona, Spain. 58 competitors, 49 men and 9 women, took part in 47 events in 12 sports.

== Medalists ==
Medal	Name	Sport	Event	Date
Gold	Michael Carruth	Boxing	Welterweight	8 August
Silver	Wayne McCullough	Boxing	Bantamweight	8 August

== Competitors ==
The following is the list of number of competitors in the Games.

Sport	Men	Women	Total
Archery	1	0	1
Athletics	16	3	19
Boxing	6	–	6
Canoeing	5	0	5
Cycling	5	0	5
Equestrian	5	4	9
Fencing	1	0	1
Judo	2	0	2
Rowing	1	0	1
Sailing	4	1	5
Swimming	1	1	2
Tennis	2	0	2
Total	49	9	58

== Archery ==
Veteran Noel Lynch was the only Irish archer at the nation's fifth appearance in the tournament. He did not qualify for the elimination rounds.

Men

Athlete	Event	Ranking round		Round of 32	Round of 16	Quarterfinals	Semifinals	Final / BM	
Athlete	Event	Score	Seed	Opposition Score	Opposition Score	Opposition Score	Opposition Score	Opposition Score	Rank
Noel Lynch	Individual	1225	62	Did not advance					

== Athletics ==
Men
Track and road events

Athlete	Event	Heats		Quarterfinal		Semifinal		Final	
Athlete	Event	Result	Rank	Result	Rank	Result	Rank	Result	Rank
Marcus O'Sullivan	1500 metres	3:37.07	5 Q	—N/a		3:37.16	8	Did not advance	
John Doherty	5000 metres	13:41.27	21	—N/a				Did not advance	
Paul Donovan	5000 metres	14:03.79	37	—N/a				Did not advance	
Frank O'Mara	5000 metres	13:38.79	18	—N/a				Did not advance	
Noel Berkeley	10,000 metres	29:23.58	35	—N/a				Did not advance	
Sean Dollman	10,000 metres	28:55.77	28	—N/a				Did not advance	
Tommy Hughes	Marathon	—N/a						2:32:55	72
Andy Ronan	Marathon	—N/a						DNF	
John Treacy	Marathon	—N/a						2:24:11	51
Thomas Kearns	110 metres hurdles	13.63	12 Q	13.87	19	Did not advance			
Jimmy McDonald	20 kilometres walk	—N/a						1:25:16	6
Bobby O'Leary	20 kilometres walk	—N/a						DQ	

Field events

Athlete	Event	Qualification		Final	
Athlete	Event	Distance	Position	Distance	Position
Victor Costello	Shot put	17.15	22	Did not advance	
Paul Quirke	Shot put	17.01	23	Did not advance	
Nick Sweeney	Discus throw	57.68	23	Did not advance	
Terry McHugh	Javelin throw	73.26	27	Did not advance	

Women
Track and road events

Athlete	Event	Heats		Quarterfinal		Semifinal		Final	
Athlete	Event	Result	Rank	Result	Rank	Result	Rank	Result	Rank
Sonia O'Sullivan	1500 metres	4:07.70	5 Q	—N/a		4:06.24	18	Did not advance	
Catherina McKiernan	3000 metres	8:57.91	20	—N/a				Did not advance	
Sonia O'Sullivan	3000 metres	8:50.08	10 Q	—N/a				8:47.41	4
Perri Williams	10 kilometres walk	—N/a						54:53	37

== Boxing ==
Athlete	Event	Round of 32	Round of 16	Quarterfinals	Semifinals	Final	
Athlete	Event	Opposition Result	Opposition Result	Opposition Result	Opposition Result	Opposition Result	Rank
Paul Buttimer	Flyweight	Malagu (NGR); L 8–12	Did not advance				
Wayne McCullough	Bantamweight	Muteweta (UGA); W 28–7	Aboud (IRQ); W 10–2	Sabo (NGR); W 31–13	Ri (PRK); W 21–16	Casamayor (CUB); L 8–14	2nd place, silver medalist(s)
Paul Griffin	Featherweight	Chungu (ZAM); L RSC R2	Did not advance				
Michael Carruth	Welterweight	Bye	Tuifao (SAM); W 11–2	Otto (GER); W 6*–6	Chenglai (THA); W 11–4	Hernández (CUB); W 13–10	1st place, gold medalist(s)
Paul Douglas	Heavyweight	Pettersson (SWE); W 8–1	Chudinov (EUN); W 15–9	Vanderlijde (NED); L RSC R1	Did not advance		
Kevin McBride	Super heavyweight	Bye	Hrivňák (TCH); L 1–21	Did not advance			

== Canoeing ==
=== Slalom ===
Athlete	Event	Run 1	Rank	Run 2	Rank	Best	Rank
Mike Corcoran	Men's C-1	131.42	17	121.57	9	121.57	12
Ian Wiley	Men's K-1	110.45	5	123.93	26	110.45	8

=== Sprint ===
Men

Athlete	Event	Heats		Repechage		Semifinals		Final	
Athlete	Event	Time	Rank	Time	Rank	Time	Rank	Time	Rank
Patrick Holmes	K-1 500 metres	1:43.46	4 R	1:43.96	3 SF	1:45.11	9	Did not advance	
Patrick Holmes	K-1 1000 metres	3:44.78	4 R	3:35.62	3 SF	3:42.07	9	Did not advance	
Alan Carey; Conor Holmes	K-2 500 metres	1:41.51	6 R	1:37.37	6	Did not advance			
Alan Carey; Conor Holmes	K-2 1000 metres	3:35.03	5 R	3:27.48	5	Did not advance			

== Cycling ==
Five cyclists, all men, represented Ireland in 1992.

=== Road ===
Men

Athlete	Event	Time	Rank
Conor Henry	Road race	4:35:56	35
Kevin Kimmage	Road race	4:35:56	32
Paul Slane	Road race	4:35:56	65
Mark Kane; Kevin Kimmage; Robert Power; Paul Slane	Team time trial	2:14:32	17

== Equestrianism ==
=== Dressage ===
Athlete	Horse	Event	Qualification		Final	
Athlete	Horse	Event	Score	Rank	Score	Rank
Anna Merveldt	Rapallo	Individual	1527	16 Q	1355	11

=== Eventing ===
Athlete	Horse	Event	Dressage		Cross-country			Jumping			Total	
Athlete	Horse	Event	Penalties	Rank	Penalties	Total	Rank	Penalties	Total	Rank	Penalties	Rank
Máiréad Curran	Watercolour	Individual	70.00	56	74.40	144.40	38	5.00	149.40	9	149.40	29
Melanie Duff	Rathlin Roe	Individual	58.80	23	87.20	146.00	45	10.00	156.00	24	156.00	32
Polly Holohan	Rusticus	Individual	63.00	34	91.20	154.20	47	10.00	164.20	24	164.20	39
Eric Smiley	Enterprise	Individual	64.60	39	50.80	115.40	24	25.00	140.40	55	140.40	27
Máiréad Curran; Melanie Duff; Polly Holohan; Eric Smiley	See above	Team	186.40	11	212.40	405.80	10	40.00	445.80	6	445.80	8

=== Jumping ===
Athlete	Horse	Event	Qualification								Final					
Athlete	Horse	Event	Round 1		Round 2		Round 3		Total		Round 1		Round 2		Total	
Athlete	Horse	Event	Score	Rank	Score	Rank	Score	Rank	Score	Rank	Penalties	Rank	Penalties	Rank	Penalties	Rank
Peter Charles	Kruger	Individual	37.00	51	64.00	24	68.00	20	169.00	16 Q	26.00	40	Did not advance			
Paul Darragh	Killelea	Individual	42.00	43	16.00	72	DNS		56.00	68	Did not advance					
James Kernan	Touchdown	Individual	52.00	36	36.00	51	59.50	28	147.50	34 Q	16.00	30	Did not advance			
Eddie Macken	Welfenkrone	Individual	13.00	75	26.50	61	DNS		39.50	75	Did not advance					
Peter Charles; Paul Darragh; James Kernan; Eddie Macken	See above	Team	—N/a								33.25	15	33.50	14	66.75	14

== Fencing ==
One male fencer represented Ireland in 1992.

Individual
Pool stage

Athlete	Event	Group Stage						
Athlete	Event	Opposition Result	Opposition Result	Opposition Result	Opposition Result	Opposition Result	Opposition Result	Rank
Michael O'Brien	Men's épée	Kulcsár (HUN); L 4–5	Felisiak (GER); L 4–5	Marx (USA); W 5–1	Pereira (ESP); W 5–3	Bandeira (POR); W 5–3	Álvarez (PAR); W 5–4	17 Q

Elimination phase

Athlete	Event	Round 1	Round 2	Round 3	Round 4	Repechage				Quarterfinals	Semifinals	Final	
Athlete	Event	Round 1	Round 2	Round 3	Round 4	Round 1	Round 2	Round 3	Round 4	Quarterfinals	Semifinals	Final	
Athlete	Event	Opposition Result	Opposition Result	Opposition Result	Opposition Result	Opposition Result	Opposition Result	Opposition Result	Opposition Result	Opposition Result	Opposition Result	Opposition Result	Rank
Michael O'Brien	Men's épée	Jacquet (SUI); L 0–2	Did not advance										

== Judo ==
Men

Athlete	Event	Round of 64	Round of 32	Round of 16	Quarterfinals	Semifinals	Repechage				Final	
Athlete	Event	Round of 64	Round of 32	Round of 16	Quarterfinals	Semifinals	Round 1	Round 2	Round 3	Round 4	Final	
Athlete	Event	Opposition Result	Opposition Result	Opposition Result	Opposition Result	Opposition Result	Opposition Result	Opposition Result	Opposition Result	Opposition Result	Opposition Result	Rank
Keith Gough	60 kg	Salvucci (ARG); W Ippon	de Souza (ANG); W Koka	Trautmann (GER); L Ippon	Did not advance		—N/a	Beaton (CAN); L Yusei-gachi	Did not advance			
Ciarán Ward	65 kg	Korhonen (FIN); W Yusei-gachi	Cuk (SLO); L Yusei-gachi	Did not advance								

== Rowing ==
Men

Athlete	Event	Heats		Repechage		Semifinals		Final	
Athlete	Event	Time	Rank	Time	Rank	Time	Rank	Time	Rank
Niall O'Toole	Single sculls	7:50.46	6 R	7:07.68	3 SC/D	9:25.95	5 FD	8:01.78	21

== Sailing ==
Women

Athlete	Event	Race							Net points	Final rank
Athlete	Event	1	2	3	4	5	6	7	Net points	Final rank
Denise Lyttle	Europe	3	21	~~31~~	18	11.7	5.7	25	84.4	12

Open

Athlete	Event	Race							Net points	Final rank
Athlete	Event	1	2	3	4	5	6	7	Net points	Final rank
David Wilkins; Peter Kennedy	Flying Dutchman	24	23	17	5.7	21	16	~~26~~	106.7	14
Mark Mansfield; Tom McWilliam	Star	17	17	21	~~22~~	18	11.7	21	105.7	15

== Swimming ==
Men

Athlete	Event	Heats		Final A/B	
Athlete	Event	Time	Rank	Time	Rank
Gary O'Toole	100 metre breaststroke	1:05.48	38	Did not advance	
Gary O'Toole	200 metre breaststroke	2:17.66	20	Did not advance	
Gary O'Toole	200 metre individual medley	2:07.67	34	Did not advance	

Women

Athlete	Event	Heats		Final A/B	
Athlete	Event	Time	Rank	Time	Rank
Michelle Smith	200 metre backstroke	2:21.37	35	Did not advance	
Michelle Smith	200 metre individual medley	2:23.83	32	Did not advance	
Michelle Smith	400 metre individual medley	4:58.94	26	Did not advance	

== Tennis ==
Men

Athlete	Event	Round of 64	Round of 32	Round of 16	Quarterfinals	Semifinals	Final	
Athlete	Event	Opposition Result	Opposition Result	Opposition Result	Opposition Result	Opposition Result	Opposition Result	Rank
Owen Casey	Singles	Gustafsson (SWE); L (6–7, 1–6, 4–6)	Did not advance					
Owen Casey; Eoin Collins	Doubles	—N/a	Lavalle / Maciel (MEX); W (7–6, 7–5, 6–4)	Hlasek / Rosset (SUI); L (6–7, 3–6, 2–6)	Did not advance			
