= Portugal at the 1992 Summer Olympics =

- IOC code: POR
- NOC: Olympic Committee of Portugal

in Barcelona
- Competitors: 90 (68 men, 22 women) in 14 sports
- Flag bearer: Filipa Cavalleri (Judo)
- Officials: 53
- Medals: Gold 0 Silver 0 Bronze 0 Total 0

Summer Olympics appearances (overview)
- 1912; 1920; 1924; 1928; 1932; 1936; 1948; 1952; 1956; 1960; 1964; 1968; 1972; 1976; 1980; 1984; 1988; 1992; 1996; 2000; 2004; 2008; 2012; 2016; 2020; 2024; 2028

Portugal competed at the 1992 Summer Olympics in Barcelona, Spain. 90 competitors, 68 men and 22 women, took part in 71 events in 14 sports.

These Olympics saw Portugal listing the biggest share of competitors in the athletics, but also debuting in the tennis and badminton events, recently elevated to Olympic sports, as with the women's judo. Portugal also participated in the roller hockey tournament (demonstration sport), as current world champions, but finishing just outside the podium.

== Competitors ==
The following is the list of number of competitors in the Games.

Sport	Men	Women	Total
Archery	0	1	1
Athletics	22	14	36
Badminton	2	0	2
Canoeing	7	0	7
Equestrian	5	0	5
Fencing	4	0	4
Judo	5	3	8
Modern pentathlon	1	–	1
Rowing	2	0	2
Sailing	8	0	8
Shooting	3	1	4
Swimming	6	3	9
Tennis	2	0	2
Wrestling	1	–	1
Total	68	22	90

== Archery ==
Women's Individual Competition:

- Ana Sousa

- Qualifying round — 1288 pts (→ 22nd)

70m	60m	50m	30m	Total
297	334	321	336	1288

- Elimination round — 98 pts (→ 26th)

- 1/16 finals — Xiangjun Ma (CHN) (→ lost 101:98, did not advance)

== Athletics ==
=== Men's events ===
800m:

- António Abrantes

- Round 1 (heat 7) — 1:50.89 (→ 5th, did not advance)

1,500m:

- Mário Silva

- Round 1 (heat 2) — 3:38.57 (→ 3rd)
- Semi-final (heat 2) — 3:38.09 (→ 9th, did not advance)

5,000m:

- Carlos Monteiro

- Semi-final (heat 4) — 14:00.53 (→ 10th, did not advance)

- Domingos Castro

- Semi-final (heat 3) — 13:24:57 (→ 5th, advanced as 2nd fastest loser)
- Final — 13:38.09 (→ 11th)

- Raimundo Santos

- Semi-final (heat 2) — 13:48.06 (→ 7th, did not advance)

10,000m:

- Domingos Castro

- Round 1 (heat 1) — did not finish

- Fernando Couto

- Round 1 (heat 2) — 29:20.06 (→ 15th, did not advance)

Marathon:

- António Pinto → did not finish
- Dionísio Castro → did not finish
- Joaquim Pinheiro → did not finish

20 km Walk:

- José Urbano — disqualified

50 km Walk:

- José Magalhães — 4:20:21 (→ 28th)
- José Pinto — disqualified
- José Urbano — 4:16:31 (→ 25th)

400m Hurdles:

- Pedro Rodrigues

- Round 1 (heat 3) — 49.46 (→ 5th, did not advance)

3000m Steeplechase:

- João Junqueira

- Round 1 (heat 3) — 8:35.68 (→ 8th, advanced as 3rd fastest loser)
- Semi-final (heat 1) — 8:39.17 (→ 10th, did not advance)

4 × 100 m Relay:

- Luís Barroso, Luís Cunha, Pedro Agostinho and Pedro Curvelo

- Round 1 (heat 2) — 40.30 (→ 5th, did not advance)

4 × 400 m Relay:

- Álvaro Silva, José Mendes, Paulo Curvelo and Pedro Rodrigues

- Round 1 (heat 1) — 3:10.11 (→ 7th, did not advance)

Pole Vault:

- Nuno Fernandes

- Qualifying round (heat 2) — 5,00 (→ 15th, did not advance)

4,80	5,00	5,20	5,30	5,40	5,50	5,55	5,60	Result
XXO	XO	XXX						5,00

=== Women's events ===
100m:

- Lucrécia Jardim

- Round 1 (heat 6) — 11.58 (→ 4th)
- Round 2 (heat 1) — 11.66 (→ 7th, did not advance)

200m:

- Lucrécia Jardim

- Round 1 (heat 1) — 23.26 (→ 3rd)
- Round 2 (heat 2) — 23.09 (→ 5th, did not advance)

800m:

- Carla Sacramento

- Round 1 (heat 2) — 2:00.57 (→ 3rd, advanced as 5th fastest loser)
- Semi-final (heat 2) — 2:02.85 (→ 6th, did not advance)

1500m:

- Carla Sacramento

- Round 1 (heat 1) — 4:10.01 (→ 5th)
- Semi-final (heat 2) — 4:05.54 (→ 9th, did not advance)

3000m:

- Fernanda Ribeiro

- Round 1 (heat 2) — 9:07.69 (9th, did not advance)

10000m:

- Albertina Dias

- Round 1 (heat 2) — 32:15.05 (→ 6th)
- Final — 32:0.393 (→ 13th)

- Conceição Ferreira

- Round 1 (heat 1) — 32:31.95 (→ 9th, advanced as 1st fastest loser)
- Final — did not finish

- Fernanda Marques

- Round 1 (heat 2) — 32:38.16 (→ 8th)
- Final — did not finish

Marathon:

- Aurora Cunha → did not finish
- Manuela Machado → 2:38:22 (→ 7th)

10 km Walk:

- Isilda Gonçalves — 50:23 (→ 34th)
- Susana Feitor — disqualified

400m Hurdles:

- Marta Moreira

- Round 1 (heat 2) — 58.24 (→ 6th, did not advance)

4 × 400 m Relay:

- Eduarda Coelho, Elsa Amaral, Lucrécia Jardim and Marta Moreira

- Round 1 (heat 2) — 3:29.38 (→ 4th, advanced as 2nd fastest loser)
- Final — 3:36.85 (→ 8th)

Discus Throw:

- Teresa Machado

- Qualifying round — 4,98 (→ 14th, did not advance)

== Badminton ==
Men's Individual Competition:

- Ricardo Fernandes

- 1/32 finals — R. Liljequist (FIN) (→ lost by 15-3, 15-11 – did not advance)

- Fernando Silva

- 1/32 finals — Peter Axelsson (SWE) (→ lost by 15-7, 15-8 – did not advance)

Men's Team Competition:

- Fernando Silva and Ricardo Fernandes

- 1/32 finals — Benny Lee and Thomas Reidy (USA) (→ lost by 15-1, 15-10 – did not advance)

== Canoeing ==
=== Sprint ===
Men

Athlete	Event	Heats		Repechage		Semifinals		Final	
Athlete	Event	Time	Rank	Time	Rank	Time	Rank	Time	Rank
José Garcia	K-1 500 m	1:42.96	3 QR	1:41.84	3 QS	1:45.88	9	Did not advance	
José Garcia	K-1 1000 m	3:46.82	4 QR	3:34.92	1 QS	3:37.34	3 QF	3:41.60	6
Joaquim Queirós; José Ferreira da Silva	K-2 500 m	1:37.73	6 QR	1:33.57	2 QS	1:32.33	7	Did not advance	
Joaquim Queirós; José Ferreira da Silva	K-2 1000 m	3:22.46	3 QR	3:18.42	4 QS	3:00.90	7	Did not advance	
António Brinco; António Monteiro; Belmiro Penetra; Rui Fernandes	K-4 1000 m	3:02.38	5 QS	—N/a		3:00.90	7	Did not advance	

== Equestrianism ==
Individual Eventing:

- António Braz — –238.60 pts (→ 58th)

Event	Dressage	Endurance	Jumping
Pts (Rank)	–85.00 (75th)	–143.60 (57th)	–10.00 (24th)
General Pts (Rank)	–85.00 (75th)	–228.60 (59th)	–238.60 (58th)

- António Ramos — –186.70 pts (46th)

Event	Dressage	Endurance	Jumping
Pts (Rank)	–72.40 (61st)	–102.80 (47th)	–11.50 (41st)
General Pts (Rank)	–72.40 (61st)	–175.20 (48th)	–186.70 (46th)

- Bernardo Rodrigues — eliminated

Event	Dressage	Endurance	Jumping
Pts (Rank)	–69.80 (54th)	eliminated	—
General Pts (Rank)	–69.80 (54th)	eliminated	—

- Vasco Ramires

Event	Dressage	Endurance	Jumping
Pts (Rank)	–91.40 (79th)	–82.40 (39th)	0.00 (1st)
General Pts (Rank)	–91.40 (79th)	–173.80 (47th)	–173.80 (41st)

Team Eventing:

- António Braz, António Ramos and Bernardo Rodrigues — –599.10 pts (→ 15th)

Event	Dressage	Endurance	Jumping
Pts (Rank)	–248.80 (?)	–328.80 (?)	–21.50 (?)
General Pts (Rank)	–248.80 (?)	–577.60 (?)	–599.10 (15th)

Individual Jumping:

- Jorge Matias — 83rd

Team Jumping:

- Jorge Matias — did not start

== Fencing ==
Four male fencers represented Portugal in 1992.

Men's épée

- José Bandeira

- Qualifying round (pool 4) — 6 matches, 1 victory (→ 6th, 61st overall, did not advance)

- Rui Frazão

- Qualifying round (pool 10) — 6 matches, 1 victory (→ 7th, 60th overall, did not advance)

Men's foil

- José Guimarães

- Qualifying round (pool 2) — 6 matches, 1 victory (→ 7th, 52nd overall, did not advance)

Men's sabre

- Luís Silva

- Qualifying round (pool 4) — 5 matches, 0 victories (→ 6th, 40th overall, did not advance)

== Gymnastics ==
Rhythmics:

- Clara Piçarra — did not start (→ 43rd)

== Judo ==
=== Men's events ===
Extra Lightweight (–60 kg):

- Rui Ludovino

Preliminary rounds A
- 1/32 finals — Pina Garcia (DOM) (→ won by yuko)
- 1/16 finals — Dashgombyn Battulga (MGL) (→ lost by ippon, did not advance)

Half Lightweight (–65 pts):

- Augusto Almeida

Preliminary rounds B
- 1/32 finals — V. Cespedes (PAR) (→ won by ippon)
- 1/16 finals — R. Sampaio (BRA) (→ lost by ippon, did not advance)
Repêchage B
- 1/32 finals — Bye
- 1/16 finals — Sang-Moon Kim (KOR) (→ lost by ippon, did not advance)

Lightweight (–71 kg):

- Rui Domingues

Preliminary rounds A
- 1/32 finals — Bye
- 1/16 finals — C. Shi (CHN) (→ lost by waza-ari, did not advance)

Half Middleweight (–78 kg):

Preliminary rounds B

- António Matias

- 1/32 finals — Bye
- 1/16 finals — Anton Summer (AUT) (→ lost by double waza-ari (=ippon), did not advance)

Middleweight (–86 kg):

- Pedro Cristóvão

Preliminary rounds B
- 1/32 finals — Bye
- 1/16 finals — D. Kistler (SUI) (→ lost by koka, did not advance)

=== Women's events ===
Half Lightweight (–52 kg):

- Paula Saldanha — 7th

Preliminary rounds B
- 1/32 finals — Bye
- 1/16 finals — R. Dechinmaa (MGL) (→ won by ippon)
- 1/8 finals — Lyne Poirier (CAN) (→ won by koka)
- 1/4 finals — Jessica Gal (NED) (→ lost by ippon)
Repêchage B
- 1/32 finals — Bye
- 1/16 finals — Bye
- 1/8 finals — Maktsoutova (EUN) (→ won by yuko)
- 1/4 finals — A. Giungi (ITA) (→ lost by yusei-gachi, did not advance)

Men's Lightweight (–56 kg):

- Filipa Cavalleri

Preliminary rounds B
- 1/32 finals — Bye
- 1/16 finals — Z. Blagojevic (IOP) (→ won by yar?)
- 1/8 finals — P. Pinitwong (THA) (→ won by yusei-gachi)
- 1/4 finals — Flagothier (BEL) (→ lost by yuko)
Repêchage B
- 1/32 finals — Bye
- 1/16 finals — Bye
- 1/8 finals — Kate Donahoo (USA) (→ lost by waza-ari, did not advance)

Half Heavyweight (–72 kg):

- Sandra Godinho

Preliminary rounds A
- 1/32 finals — Bye
- 1/16 finals — Werbrouck (BEL) (→ lost by yuko, did not advance)

== Modern pentathlon ==
One male pentathlete represented Portugal in 1992.

Men's Individual Competition:

- Manuel Barroso — 4719 pts (→ 53rd)

Event	Fencing		Swimming		Shooting			Cross-country		Riding	
Event	Vict.	Pen.	Time	Heat	Hits	Pen.	Heat	Time	Pen.	Time	Pen.
Event	19	–	3:23.2	2	159	60	1	12:26.0	–	1:58.7	–
Pts (Rank)	541 (62nd)		1248 (25th)		595 (65th)			1327 (1st)		1008 (26th)	
General Pts (Rank)	541 (62nd)		1799 (59th)		2384 (33rd)			3711 (?)		4719 (53rd)	

== Roller Hockey ==
Men's Competition:

- António Heitor, António Neves, Franklin Pais, Luís Ferreira, Paulo Almeida, Paulo Alves, Pedro Alves, Rui Lopes, Vitor Hugo Silva and Vitor Fortunato — 4th

- Preliminary round (Group A) — 5 matches, 4 victories, 1 defeat – 8 pts (→ 2nd)
- Semi-finals — 5 matches, 3 victories, 2 defeats – 6 pts (→ 3rd)
- Final 3rd/4th — Italy (→ lost 3-2)

== Rowing ==
Men's Double Sculls:

- Daniel Alves and João Santos

- Round 1 (heat 3) — 6:54.55 (→ 5th)
- Repêchage 4 — 6:46.14 (→ 4th)
- Semi-final C — 6:32.01 (→ 4th)
- Final D — 6:42.00 (→ 1st, 18th overall)

== Sailing ==
Men's Lechner A-390:

- João Rodrigues — 233 pts (→ 23rd)

Race	1	2	3	4	5	6	7	8	9	10	Total	Net
Place	25th	10th	18th	20th	22nd	21st	24th	23rd	~~28th~~	18th	Total	Net
Pts	31	16	24	24	28	27	30	29	~~33~~	24	266	233

Men's 470:

- Eduardo Seruca and Victor Hugo Rocha (helm) — 148 pts (→ 24th)

Race	1	2	3	4	5	6	7	Total	Net
Place	23rd	~~27th~~	20th	26th	5th	21st	18th	Total	Net
Pts	29	~~33~~	26	32	10	27	24	181	148

Soling:

- António Tanger Correia (helm), Luís Miguel Santos and Ricardo Batista — 116 pts (→ 21st)

Race	1	2	3	4	5	6	Total	Net
Place	21st	~~21st~~	16th	18th	16th	15th	Total	Net
Pts	27	~~27~~	22	24	22	21	143	148

Star:

- Fernando Bello (helm) and Francisco Pinheiro de Melo — 101 pts (→ 12th)

Race	1	2	3	4	5	6	7	Total	Net
Place	1st	9th	~~False start~~	19th	8th	21st	14th	Total	Net
Pts	0	15	~~33~~	25	14	27	20	134	101

== Shooting ==
Men's Trap:

- António Palminha

- Preliminary round — 145 hits (→ 14th)

Round	1	2	3	4	5	6	Total
Hits	24	25	25	25	24	22	145

- Semi-final — 193 hits (→ 11th, did not advance)

Round	1	2	3	4	5	6	7	8	Total
Hits	24	25	25	25	23	25	24	22	193

- João Rebelo

- Preliminary round — 145 hits (→ 10th)

Round	1	2	3	4	5	6	Total
Hits	21	25	25	24	25	25	145

- Semi-final — 191 hits (→ 16th, did not advance)

Round	1	2	3	4	5	6	7	8	Total
Hits	21	25	25	22	24	24	25	25	191

- Manuel Silva

- Preliminary round — 146 hits (→ 7th)

Round	1	2	3	4	5	6	Total
Hits	24	24	25	23	25	25	146

- Semi-final — 193 hits (→ 11th, did not advance)

Round	1	2	3	4	5	6	7	8	Total
Hits	24	24	25	25	22	23	25	25	193

Women's 10m Air Rifle:

- Carla Ribeiro

- Preliminary round — 387 hits (→ 26th, did not advance)

Round	1	2	3	4	Total
Hits	94	99	97	97	387

== Swimming ==
=== Men's events ===
100m Backstroke:

- Miguel Arrobas

- Heats (heat 2) — 59.37 (→ 3rd, did not advance – 42nd overall)

200m Backstroke:

- Miguel Arrobas

- Heats (heat 2) — 2:06.02 (→ 6th, did not advance – 34th overall)

100m Breaststroke:

- Alexandre Yokochi

- Heats (heat 3) — 1:05.61 (→ 3rd, did not advance – 39th overall)

200m Breaststroke:

- Alexandre Yokochi

.* Heats (heat 4) — 2:18.97 (→ 3rd, did not advance – 25th overall)

100m Butterfly:

- Miguel Cabrita

- Heats (heat 4) — 57.07 (→ 6th, did not advance – 46th overall)

200m Butterfly:

- Diogo Madeira

- Heats (heat 3) — 2:02.22 (→ 2nd, did not advance – 29th overall)

- Miguel Cabrita

- Heats (heat 4) — 2:04.28 (→ 6th, did not advance – 34th place)

50m Freestyle:

- Paulo Trindade

- Heats (heat 7) — 23.81 (→ 8th, did not advance – 36th overall)

400m Freestyle:

- Artur Costa

- Heats (heat 2) — 3:58.80 (→ 3rd, did not advance – 26th overall)

1500m Freestyle:

- Artur Costa

- Heats (heat 2) — 15:41.26 (→ 6th, did not advance — 17th overall)

200m Individual Medley

- Diogo Madeira

- Heats (heat 3) — 2:07.38 (→ 2nd, did not advance – 33rd place)

=== Women's events ===
100m Backstroke:

- Ana Barros

- Heats (heat 3) — 1:06.11 (→ 7th, did not advance – 36th overall)

200m Backstroke:

- Ana Barros

- Heats (heat 3) — 2:17.59 (→ 2nd, did not advance – 24th overall)

100m Butterfly:

- Ana Alegria

- Heats (heat 3) — 1:04.18 (→ 4th, did not advance – 36th overall)

- Joana Arantes

- Heats (heat 2) — 1:04.59 (→ 4th, did not advance – 39th place)

200m Butterfly:

- Joana Arantes

- Heat (heat 4) — 2:16.56 (→ 6th, did not advance – 19th overall)

100m Freestyle:

- Ana Alegria

- Heats (heat 2) — 1:00.35 (→ 6th, did not advance – 41st overall)

== Tennis ==
Men's Singles Competition:

- Bernardo Mota

- 1/32 finals — Goran Ivanišević (CRO) (→ lost by 2-6, 2-6, 7-6, 6-4, 3-6 – did not advance)

Men's Doubles Competition:

- Emanuel Couto and Bernardo Mota

- 1/16 finals — Guy Forget and Henri Leconte (FRA) (→ lost by 1-6, 3-6, 1-6 – did not advance)

== Wrestling ==
Men's Greco-Roman Welterweight (–74 kg):

- Paulo Martins

Elimination round B — 2 defeats, 1.0 technical pts (→ 8th, did not advance)
- Round 1 — Dobri Ivanov (BUL) (→ lost by 6-1; +1.0 technical pts)
- Round 2 — Qingkun Wei (CHN) (→ lost by 16-0; +0 technical pts)

== Officials ==
- José Geraldes de Oliveira (chief of mission)
- António Livramento (roller hockey coach)
- Luís Alfredo Dias Rei (roller hockey)
