= Belgium at the 1992 Summer Olympics =

- IOC code: BEL
- NOC: Belgian Olympic and Interfederal Committee
- Website: www.teambelgium.be (in Dutch and French)

in Barcelona
- Competitors: 68 (43 men, 25 women) in 18 sports
- Flag bearer: Frans Peeters
- Medals Ranked 44th: Gold 0 Silver 1 Bronze 2 Total 3

Summer Olympics appearances (overview)
- 1900; 1904; 1908; 1912; 1920; 1924; 1928; 1932; 1936; 1948; 1952; 1956; 1960; 1964; 1968; 1972; 1976; 1980; 1984; 1988; 1992; 1996; 2000; 2004; 2008; 2012; 2016; 2020; 2024; 2028

Other related appearances
- 1906 Intercalated Games

Belgium competed at the 1992 Summer Olympics in Barcelona, Spain. 68 competitors, 43 men and 25 women, took part in 70 events in 18 sports.

== Medalists ==
Medal	Name	Sport	Event	Date
Silver	Annelies Bredael	Rowing	Women's single sculls	2 August
Bronze	Heidi Rakels	Judo	Women's 66 kg	29 July
Bronze	Cédric Mathy	Cycling	Men's points race	31 July

== Competitors ==
The following is the list of number of competitors in the Games.

Sport	Men	Women	Total
Archery	1	0	1
Athletics	4	3	7
Badminton	1	0	1
Boxing	1	–	1
Canoeing	2	0	2
Cycling	6	1	7
Diving	1	0	1
Equestrian	6	2	8
Gymnastics	0	2	2
Judo	4	5	9
Rowing	6	3	9
Sailing	3	2	5
Shooting	1	3	4
Swimming	4	3	7
Table tennis	2	0	2
Tennis	0	1	1
Wrestling	1	–	1
Total	43	25	68

== Archery ==
Veteran Paul Vermeiren was the only Belgian archer to compete in the nation's sixth appearance in the modern Olympic archery tournament. He won his first elimination match, but was then defeated by the eventual silver medallist.

Men

Athlete	Event	Ranking round		Round of 32	Round of 16	Quarterfinals	Semifinals	Final / BM	
Athlete	Event	Score	Seed	Opposition Score	Opposition Score	Opposition Score	Opposition Score	Opposition Score	Rank
Paul Vermeiren	Individual	1294	17 Q	Toft (DEN); W 101–97	Chung (KOR); L 102–111	Did not advance			

== Athletics ==
Men
Track and road events

Athlete	Event	Heats		Quarterfinal		Semifinal		Final	
Athlete	Event	Result	Rank	Result	Rank	Result	Rank	Result	Rank
Patrick Stevens	100 metres	10.63	29 Q	10.69	31	Did not advance			
Patrick Stevens	200 metres	20.93	14 Q	20.67	18	Did not advance			
Vincent Rousseau	10,000 metres	29:25.68	36	—N/a				Did not advance	
William Van Dijck	3000 metres steeplechase	8:27.23	5 Q	—N/a		8:26.70	9 Q	8:22.51	9
Godfried De Jonckheere	50 kilometres walk	—N/a						DQ	

Women
Track and road events

Athlete	Event	Heats		Quarterfinal		Semifinal		Final	
Athlete	Event	Result	Rank	Result	Rank	Result	Rank	Result	Rank
Véronique Collard	10,000 metres	DNF		—N/a				Did not advance	
Lieve Slegers	10,000 metres	32:40.59	19 q	—N/a				32:14.17	15
Sylvia Dethiér	100 metres hurdles	13.19	13 Q	13.32	21	Did not advance			

== Badminton ==
Men

Athlete	Event	Round of 64	Round of 32	Round of 16	Quarterfinals	Semifinals	Final	
Athlete	Event	Opposition Result	Opposition Result	Opposition Result	Opposition Result	Opposition Result	Opposition Result	Rank
Pedro Vanneste	Singles	Khan (SGP); L (11–15, 3–15)	Did not advance					

== Boxing ==
Athlete	Event	Round of 32	Round of 16	Quarterfinals	Semifinals	Final	
Athlete	Event	Opposition Result	Opposition Result	Opposition Result	Opposition Result	Opposition Result	Rank
Abdelkader Wahabi	Light welterweight	Fulanse (ZAM); L 3–13	Did not advance				

== Canoeing ==
=== Sprint ===
Men

Athlete	Event	Heats		Repechage		Semifinals		Final	
Athlete	Event	Time	Rank	Time	Rank	Time	Rank	Time	Rank
Antoon De Brauwer; Bart Stalmans	K-2 500 metres	1:41.84	7 R	1:33.51	5	Did not advance			
Antoon De Brauwer; Bart Stalmans	K-2 1000 metres	3:23.48	4 R	3:21.73	3 SF	3:25.96	8	Did not advance	

== Cycling ==
Seven cyclists, six men and one woman, represented Belgium in 1992. Cédric Mathy won bronze in the men's point race.

=== Road ===
Men

Athlete	Event	Time	Rank
Wim Omloop	Road race	DNF	
Erwin Thijs	Road race	DNF	
Michel Van Haecke	Road race	DNF	

Women

Athlete	Event	Time	Rank
Kristel Werckx	Road race	2:05:03	15

=== Track ===
Sprint

Athlete	Event	Qualification		Round 1	Repechage		Round 2	Repechage 2	Quarterfinals	Semifinals	Final	
Athlete	Event	Qualification		Round 1	Round 1	Round 2	Round 2	Repechage 2	Quarterfinals	Semifinals	Final	
Athlete	Event	Time Speed (km/h)	Rank	Opposition Time Speed (km/h)	Opposition Time Speed (km/h)	Opposition Time Speed (km/h)	Opposition Time Speed (km/h)	Opposition Time Speed (km/h)	Opposition Time Speed (km/h)	Opposition Time Speed (km/h)	Opposition Time Speed (km/h)	Rank
Erik Schoefs	Men's sprint	10.819	9	Ķiksis (LAT); W	Bye		Fiedler (GER), Ķiksis (LAT); L	Kovsh (EUN); L	Did not advance			

Time trial

Athlete	Event	Time	Rank
Tom Steels	Time trial	1:07.085	19

Pursuit

Athlete	Event	Qualification		Quarterfinals	Semifinals	Final	
Athlete	Event	Time	Rank	Opposition Time	Opposition Time	Opposition Time	Rank
Cédric Mathy	Men's individual pursuit	4:37.288	9 Q	Ehara (JPN); W 4:33.942	Did not advance		6
Kristel Werckx	Women's individual pursuit	3:50.051	9	Did not advance			

Points race

Athlete	Event	Qualification			Final		
Athlete	Event	Laps	Points	Rank	Laps	Points	Rank
Cédric Mathy	Points race	−1 lap	13	10 Q	0 laps	41	3rd place, bronze medalist(s)

== Diving ==
Men

Athlete	Event	Qualification		Final	
Athlete	Event	Points	Rank	Points	Rank
Alexei Kogalev	3 m springboard	323.46	26	Did not advance	

== Equestrianism ==
=== Eventing ===
Athlete	Horse	Event	Dressage		Cross-country			Jumping			Total	
Athlete	Horse	Event	Penalties	Rank	Penalties	Total	Rank	Penalties	Total	Rank	Penalties	Rank
Jef Desmedt	Dolleman	Individual	64.60	39	38.80	103.40	13	5.00	108.40	9	108.40	10
Karin Donckers	Britt	Individual	75.40	69	24.00	99.40	5	5.00	104.40	9	104.40	8
Willy Sneyers	Drum	Individual	51.60	10	48.40	100.00	20	20.25	120.25	53	120.25	18
Dirk Van Der Elst	Fatal Love	Individual	74.80	67	81.60	156.40	41	10.00	166.40	24	166.40	40
Jef Desmedt; Karin Donckers; Willy Sneyers; Dirk Van Der Elst	See above	Team	191.00	12	111.20	302.80	3	20.00	333.05	3	333.05	4

=== Jumping ===
Athlete	Horse	Event	Qualification								Final					
Athlete	Horse	Event	Round 1		Round 2		Round 3		Total		Round 1		Round 2		Total	
Athlete	Horse	Event	Score	Rank	Score	Rank	Score	Rank	Score	Rank	Penalties	Rank	Penalties	Rank	Penalties	Rank
Evelyne Blaton	Careful	Individual	76.50	11	18.00	70	73.00	15	167.50	17 Q	8.00	14 Q	9.00	10	17.00	12
Dirk Demeersman	Edelbert	Individual	56.00	29	21.50	65	DNS		77.50	62	Did not advance					
Ludo Philippaerts	Darco	Individual	82.50	1	48.00	39	76.00	12	206.50	5 Q	4.00	6 Q	8.25	7	12.25	7
Jean-Claude Van Geenberghe	Queen of Diamonds	Individual	18.00	70	21.50	65	DNS		39.50	75	Did not advance					
Evelyne Blaton; Dirk Demeersman; Ludo Philippaerts; Jean-Claude Van Geenberghe	See abovve	Team	—N/a								8.75	3	48.50	17	57.25	12

== Gymnastics ==
=== Artistic ===
==== Women ====
Individual

Athlete	Event	Qualification						Final					
Athlete	Event	Apparatus				Total	Rank	Apparatus				Total	Rank
Athlete	Event	V	UB	BB	F	Total	Rank	V	UB	BB	F	Total	Rank
Bénédicte Evrard	All-around	19.474	19.412	19.312	18.962	77.160	48 q	9.650	9.787	9.775	9.762	38.974	23

=== Rhythmic ===
Athlete	Event	Qualification						Final						
Athlete	Event	Hoop	Rope	Clubs	Ball	Total	Rank	Qualification	Hoop	Rope	Clubs	Ball	Total	Rank
Cindy Stollenberg	Individual	8.925	8.875	8.550	8.600	34.950	39	Did not advance						

== Judo ==
Men

Athlete	Event	Round of 64	Round of 32	Round of 16	Quarterfinals	Semifinals	Repechage				Final	
Athlete	Event	Round of 64	Round of 32	Round of 16	Quarterfinals	Semifinals	Round 1	Round 2	Round 3	Round 4	Final	
Athlete	Event	Opposition Result	Opposition Result	Opposition Result	Opposition Result	Opposition Result	Opposition Result	Opposition Result	Opposition Result	Opposition Result	Opposition Result	Rank
Philip Laats	65 kg	Bye	Traavik (NOR); W Yuko	Maralgerel (MGL); W Yusei-gachi	Csák (HUN); L Ippon	Did not advance	Bye		Petřikov (TCH); W Ippon	Maruyama (JPN); W Ippon	Quellmalz (GER); L Yusei-gachi	5
Johan Laats	78 kg	Bye	Birch (GBR); W Yusei-gachi	Zsoldos (HUN); W Ippon	Damaisin (FRA); W Ippon	Yoshida (JPN); L Ippon	Bye				Kim (KOR); L Waza-ari	5
Robert Van De Walle	95 kg	Bye	Caya (CAF); W w/o	Nastula (POL); L Ippon	Did not advance		—N/a	Yun (KOR); W Ippon	Baljinnyam (MGL); W Yusei-gachi	Pertelson (EST); L Ippon	Did not advance	
Harry Van Barneveld	+95 kg	—N/a	Al Aoua (SYR); W w/o	Muller (LUX); W Ippon	Ogawa (JPN); L Ippon	Did not advance	—N/a	Bye	Obwoge (KEN); W Ippon	Pérez (ESP); W Ippon	Csősz (HUN); L Waza-ari	5

Women

Athlete	Event	Round of 32	Round of 16	Quarterfinals	Semifinals	Repechage			Final	
Athlete	Event	Round of 32	Round of 16	Quarterfinals	Semifinals	Round 1	Round 2	Round 3	Final	
Athlete	Event	Opposition Result	Opposition Result	Opposition Result	Opposition Result	Opposition Result	Opposition Result	Opposition Result	Opposition Result	Rank
Heidi Goossens	52 kg	Giungi (ITA); L Yuko	Did not advance							
Nicole Flagothier	56 kg	Bye	Donahoo (USA); W Waza-ari	Cavalleri (POR); W Yuko	Fairbrother (GBR); L Yuko	Bye			Tateno (JPN); L Ippon	5
Gella Vandecaveye	61 kg	Thant Phyu Phyu (MYA); W Ippon	Hämmerling (SUI); W Ippon	Eickhoff (GER); L Waza-ari	Did not advance	Bye	Petrova (EUN); L Waza-ari	Did not advance		
Heidi Rakels	66 kg	Bye	Campos (BRA); W Ippon	Howey (GBR); L Yusei-gachi	Did not advance	Bye	Leng (CHN); W Yuko	Jividen (USA); W Shido	Schreiber (GER); W Koka	3rd place, bronze medalist(s)
Ulla Werbrouck	72 kg	Godinho (POR); W Yuko	Lesivakaruakitotoiya (FIJ); W Ippon	de Kok (NED); L Kiken-gachi	Did not advance	Bye	Meignan (FRA); L Ippon	Did not advance		

== Rowing ==
Men

Athlete	Event	Heats		Repechage		Semifinals		Final	
Athlete	Event	Time	Rank	Time	Rank	Time	Rank	Time	Rank
Dirk Crois; Alain Lewuillon; Tom Symoens; Wim Van Belleghem	Quadruple sculls	5:53.47	3 SF	Bye		6:05.87	6 FB	6:01.38	12
Jaak Van Driessche; Luc Goiris	Coxless pair	6:38.49	1 SF	Bye		6:34.72	2 FA	6:38.20	5

Women

Athlete	Event	Heats		Repechage		Semifinals		Final	
Athlete	Event	Time	Rank	Time	Rank	Time	Rank	Time	Rank
Annelies Bredael	Single sculls	7:50.02	1 SF	Bye		7:33.97	2 FA	7:26.64	2nd place, silver medalist(s)
Renée Govaert; Ann Haesebrouck	Double sculls	7:41.32	3 SF	Bye		7:07.35	5 FB	7:06.98	9

== Sailing ==
Men

Athlete	Event	Race										Net points	Final rank
Athlete	Event	1	2	3	4	5	6	7	8	9	10	Net points	Final rank
Paul Van Den Abeele	Lechner A-390	25	3	20	13	~~26~~	26	18	17	25	23	170	15
Dirk Bellemans; Johan Bellemans	470	15	11.7	27	35	~~36~~	22	27	—N/a			137.7	18

Women

Athlete	Event	Race										Net points	Final rank
Athlete	Event	1	2	3	4	5	6	7	8	9	10	Net points	Final rank
Christ'l Smet	Lechner A-390	14	26	16	18	22	25	19	23	~~31~~	16	179	15
Min Dezillie	Europe	24	20	8	24	21	~~31~~	18	—N/a			115	18

== Shooting ==
Women

Athlete	Event	Qualification		Final	
Athlete	Event	Points	Rank	Points	Rank
Karin Biva	10 metre air rifle	385	31	Did not advance	
Anne Goffin	10 metre air pistol	377	15	Did not advance	
Anne Goffin	25 metre pistol	562	39	Did not advance	
Sonia Vettenburg	10 metre air pistol	369	42	Did not advance	

Open

Athlete	Event	Qualification		Final	
Athlete	Event	Points	Rank	Points	Rank
Frans Peeters	Trap	192	14	Did not advance	

== Swimming ==
Men

Athlete	Event	Heats		Final A/B	
Athlete	Event	Time	Rank	Time	Rank
Fred Deburghgraeve	100 metre breaststroke	1:05.10	34	Did not advance	
Fred Deburghgraeve	200 metre breaststroke	2:16.93	19	Did not advance	
Stefaan Maene	200 metre freestyle	1:51.85	24	Did not advance	
Stefaan Maene	100 metre backstroke	56.34	12 FB	56.47	10
Stefaan Maene	200 metre backstroke	1:59.64	4 FA	2:00.91	8
Stefaan Maene	200 metre individual medley	2:06.16	24	Did not advance	
Yasuhiro Vandewalle	100 metre backstroke	56.20	10 FB	56.36	9
Yasuhiro Vandewalle	200 metre backstroke	2:01.46	13 FB	2:02.45	14
Marc Verbeeck	50 metre freestyle	24.85	53	Did not advance	
Marc Verbeeck	100 metre freestyle	52.97	48	Did not advance	
Yasuhiro Vandewalle; Fred Deburghgraeve; Stefaan Maene; Marc Verbeeck	4 x 100 metre medley relay	3:47.64	16	Did not advance	

Women

Athlete	Event	Heats		Final A/B	
Athlete	Event	Time	Rank	Time	Rank
Isabelle Arnould	200 metre freestyle	2:04.06	20	Did not advance	
Isabelle Arnould	400 metre freestyle	4:13.81	7 FA	4:13.75	6
Isabelle Arnould	800 metre freestyle	8:40.86	7 FA	8:41.86	8
Brigitte Becue	100 metre breaststroke	1:12.82	21	Did not advance	
Brigitte Becue	200 metre breaststroke	2:34.11	17	Did not advance	
Brigitte Becue	200 metre individual medley	2:21.98	25	Did not advance	
Sandra Cam	200 metre freestyle	2:04.72	25	Did not advance	
Sandra Cam	400 metre freestyle	4:17.87	15 FB	4:14.11	10
Sandra Cam	800 metre freestyle	8:50.91	14	Did not advance	

== Table tennis ==
Men

Athlete	Event	Group Stage				Round of 16	Quarterfinal	Semifinal	Final	
Athlete	Event	Opposition Result	Opposition Result	Opposition Result	Rank	Opposition Result	Opposition Result	Opposition Result	Opposition Result	Rank
Jean-Michel Saive	Singles	Al-Idokht (IRI); W 2–0	Mazunov (EUN); W 2–1	Hoyama (BRA); W 2–0	1 Q	Ding (AUT); L 0–3	Did not advance			
Jean-Michel Saive; Philippe Saive	Doubles	Hoyama / Kano (BRA); W 2–0	Kim / Yoo (KOR); L 0–2	—N/a	2	Did not advance				

== Tennis ==
Athlete	Event	1st Round	2nd Round	3rd Round	Quarter-finals	Semi-finals	Final / BM	
Athlete	Event	Opposition Score	Opposition Score	Opposition Score	Opposition Score	Opposition Score	Opposition Score	Rank
Sabine Appelmans	Singles	McQuillan (AUS); W 6-3, 6-3	Provis (AUS); W 6-2, 6-1	Maniokova (EUN); W 6-1, 6-3	Graf (GER); L 1-6, 0-6	Did not advance		

== Wrestling ==
Greco-Roman

Athlete	Event	Group Stage							Final	
Athlete	Event	Opposition Result	Opposition Result	Opposition Result	Opposition Result	Opposition Result	Opposition Result	Rank	Opposition Result	Rank
Jean-Pierre Wafflard	82 kg	Fredriksson (SWE); L 0–1	Park (KOR); L 0–1	Did not advance				8	Did not advance	
