= 1993 FINA World Swimming Championships (25 m) – Women's 4 × 100 metre medley relay =

The finals and the qualifying heats of the Women's 4 × 100 metres Medley Relay event at the 1993 FINA Short Course World Championships were held in Palma de Mallorca, Spain.

== Final ==
Rank	Final	Time
	China; He Cihong; Dai Guadong; Liu Limin; Le Jingyi	3:57.73 WR
	Australia; Elli Overton; Linley Frame; Petria Thomas; Susie O'Neill	4:00.17
	United States; Angel Martino; Kelli King-Bednar; Kristie Krueger; Sarah Perroni	4:01.30
4.	Sweden; Therese Alshammar; Hanna Jaltner; Ellenor Svensson; Linda Olofsson	4:07.26
5.	France; Helen Ricardo; Constance Leblond; Cécile Jeanson; Julie Blaise	4:09.70
6.	Russia; Nina Zhivanevskaya; Olga Prokhorova; Svetlana Pozdeyeva; Tatyana Litovchenko	4:11.54
7.	South Africa; Marianne Kriel; Tania Naudé; Mandy Loots; Tracy Elliot	4:12.59
8.	Portugal; Ana Barros; Joana Soutrino; Joana Arantes; Ana Alegria	4:13.09

== See also ==
- 1992 Women's Olympic Games 4 × 100 m Medley Relay
- 1993 Women's European LC Championships 4 × 100 m Medley Relay
