= Anna Herrmann =

Anna Herrmann may refer to:

- Anna Herrmann (actor) (born 1987), German actor
- Anna Herrmann (politician) (1892–1980), German politician

== See also ==
- Anna Hermann
