= Sneyers =

Sneyers is a surname. Notable people with the surname include:

- Arthur Sneyers, Belgian sailor
- René Sneyers (1918–1984), Belgian chemist
- Willy Sneyers (born 1950), Belgian equestrian
