= Fiefharrie =

- Ortsteil of Negenharrie
- Interactive map of Fiefharrie
- Location within Germany Location within Schleswig-Holstein
- Coordinates: 54°8′30″N 10°4′19″E
- Country: Germany
- State: Schleswig-Holstein
- District: Rendsburg-Eckernförde
- Municipality: Negenharrie
- Time zone: UTC+01:00 (CET)
  - Summer (DST): UTC+02:00 (CEST)
- Postal codes: 24625
- Dialling codes: 04322, 04394
- Vehicle registration: RD, ECK

Fiefharrie is a district (Ortsteil) of the municipality of Negenharrie in the district of Rendsburg-Eckernförde, Schleswig-Holstein, Germany. It is characterized by half-timbered and brick farmhouses dating from the 19th century, with notable sights including a mill tower and a large, listed, avenue of linden trees.

== Geography ==
Fiefharrie lies in the south of the Negenharrie settlement, between Neumünster and Kiel. It directly borders the Dosenmoor nature reserve.

== History ==
The name derives from the word fief, translating to five in Low German, and refers to a settlement with five farms. While the village now consists of many single-family homes, it was formerly a predominantly agricultural area.

== Notable people ==
- Herbert Blöcker (1943–2014), equestrian, won three Olympic medals, born in Fiefharrie
