= Göttler =

Göttler or Gottler is a German language surname from the personal name Gottfried. Notable people with the name include:

- Archie Gottler (1896–1959), American composer, screenwriter, actor, and film director
- Vilmos Göttler (1951), Hungarian equestrian
