= Antonio Ramos =

Antonio Ramos may refer to:

- Antonio J. Ramos (born 1946), United States Air Force general
- Antonio Sagardía Ramos (1880–1962), Spanish military officer and war criminal
- António Ramos (born 1950), Portuguese equestrian
