= Rissik =

Rissik is a surname. Notable people with the surname include:

- Andrew Rissik, British scriptwriter, journalist and critic
- David Rissik, South African equestrian
- Gerard Rissik, Governor of the South African Reserve Bank
- Yuliya Rissik, Kazakhstani swimmer

== See also ==
- Rissik Street Post Office
- Rissik (House of Assembly of South Africa constituency)
