= Kimmage (surname) =

Kimmage is a surname. Notable people with the surname include:

- Kevin Kimmage (born 1967), Irish road bicycle racer, brother of Paul
- Paul Kimmage (born 1962), Irish sports journalist and former professional road bicycle racer
