= Merethe Jensen =

Danish equestrian

Personal information
- Nationality: Danish
- Born: 2 April 1970 (age 54); Roskilde, Denmark

Sport
- Sport: Equestrian

Merethe Jensen (born 2 April 1970) is a Danish equestrian. She competed in the individual jumping event at the 1992 Summer Olympics.
