= Hermann Weiland =

Croatian and German equestrian (both 1949)

Personal information
- Full name: Hermann Weiland
- Nationality: German, Croatian
- Born: 16 December 1949 (age 75); Mannheim, Germany.

Sport
- Sport: Equestrian

Hermann Weiland (born 16 November 1949) is a German, Guamanian, and Croatian equestrian and architect. Born in Mannheim, he had initially placed 18th at the 1987 German Championships. As his chances of competing for Germany were low, he switched his sporting nationality to Guam. He then switched his nationality to compete for Croatia.

Weiland competed for Croatia at the 1992 Summer Olympics, the first Croatian delegation to compete at a games, though he marched with Guam during the opening ceremony. He competed in the individual show jumping event and placed 72nd. He also competed at the 1993 and 1995 European Show Jumping Championships. Outside of competing in sport, he designed golf courses and founded one.

== Biography ==
Hermann Weiland was born on 16 November 1949 in Mannheim, Germany. Weiland competed at the 1987 German Championships held in Mannheim, where he placed 18th. Upon realizing he had a low chance to compete for the German team, he initially competed for Guam. As he would have had to live in Guam for one and a half years in order to gain citizenship there, he instead switched his sporting nationality to Croatia.

He competed for Croatia at the 1992 Summer Olympics, the first Croatian delegation to compete at any edition of the games. However, he still marched with the delegation for Guam at the games' opening ceremony, wearing a grass skirt and the Guam uniform. He competed in the qualifying rounds for the individual show jumping event from 4 to 7 August. There, he had amassed a total of 52.00 points and placed equal 72nd out of the 87 competitors that competed in the event. Weiland did not advance to the final. After the games, he competed at the 1993 European Show Jumping Championships in Gijón, Spain, and the 1995 European Show Jumping Championships in St. Gallen, Switzerland, on behalf of Croatia.

Outside of sporting competition, Weiland was a practicing landscape architect and worked in horticulture construction. In Germany, he often designed golf courses and founded Weiland Golf Courses in 1996.
