= Bénédicte Atger =

French endurance rider (1958–2024)

Personal information
- Full name: Bénédicte Emond-Bon Atger
- Discipline: Endurance riding
- Born: 17 April 1958
- Died: 13 June 2024 (aged 66)
- Horse: Sunday d'Aurabelle
Medal record
Representing France
World Equestrian Games
Gold medal – first place	1994 The Hague	Team endurance

Bénédicte Emond-Bon Atger (17 April 1958 – 13 June 2024) was a French equestrian endurance rider. At the 1994 FEI World Equestrian Games, she won the gold medal in team endurance riding. Atger died on 13 June 2024, at the age of 66.
