= Lone Kroman Petersen =

Danish equestrian (born 1950)

Personal information
- Nationality: Danish
- Born: 19 April 1950 (age 76) Ringe, Denmark

Sport
- Sport: Equestrian

Lone Kroman Petersen (born 19 April 1950) is a Danish equestrian. She competed in the individual jumping event at the 1992 Summer Olympics.
