= Nicki DeSousa =

Bermudian equestrian

Personal information
- Nationality: Bermudian
- Born: 10 May 1966 (age 58)

Sport
- Sport: Equestrian

Nicki DeSousa (born 10 May 1966) is a Bermudian equestrian. She competed in the individual eventing at the 1992 Summer Olympics.
