= Ulrika Hedin =

Swedish equestrian

Personal information
- Nationality: Swedish
- Born: 25 January 1952 (age 73); Fagersta, Sweden

Sport
- Sport: Equestrian

Ulrika Hedin (born 25 January 1952) is a Swedish equestrian. She competed in two events at the 1992 Summer Olympics.
