= Ilian Iliev (equestrian) =

Bulgarian equestrian

Personal information
- Nationality: Bulgarian
- Born: 2 August 1966 (age 58)

Sport
- Sport: Equestrian

Ilian Iliev (born 2 August 1966) is a Bulgarian equestrian. He competed in the individual eventing at the 1992 Summer Olympics.
