= Henrik Lannér =

Swedish equestrian

Personal information
- Nationality: Swedish
- Born: 13 April 1968 (age 58) Borås, Sweden

Sport
- Sport: Equestrian

Henrik Lannér (born 13 April 1968) is a Swedish equestrian. He competed in two events at the 1992 Summer Olympics.
