= Peter Gotz =

South African equestrian

Personal information
- Nationality: South African
- Born: 2 June 1955 (age 69)

Sport
- Sport: Equestrian

Peter Gotz (born 2 June 1955) is a South African equestrian. He competed in the individual jumping event at the 1992 Summer Olympics.
