= Jiří Pecháček =

Czech equestrian

Personal information
- Nationality: Czech
- Born: 5 August 1943 (age 81); Zruč-Senec, Czechoslovakia

Sport
- Sport: Equestrian

Jiří Pecháček (born 5 August 1943) is a Czech equestrian. He competed in the individual jumping event at the 1992 Summer Olympics.
