= Antonio Alfaro =

Mexican equestrian

Personal information
- Nationality: Mexican
- Born: 13 June 1956 (age 68)

Sport
- Sport: Equestrian

Antonio Alfaro (born 13 June 1956) is a Mexican equestrian. He competed in the individual eventing at the 1992 Summer Olympics.
