= Vasiliu Tanas =

Soviet equestrian

Personal information
- Nationality: Soviet
- Born: 2 January 1965 (age 60)

Sport
- Sport: Equestrian

Vasiliu Tanas (born 2 January 1965) is a Soviet equestrian. He competed in two events at the 1992 Summer Olympics.
