= Sandro Chikhladze =

Soviet equestrian

Personal information
- Nationality: Soviet
- Born: 20 June 1965 (age 59)

Sport
- Sport: Equestrian

Sandro Chikhladze (born 20 June 1965) is a Soviet equestrian. He competed in two events at the 1992 Summer Olympics.
