= Sören von Rönne =

German equestrian

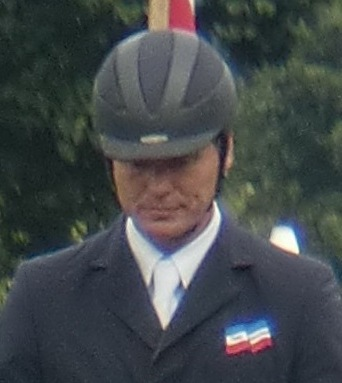
- Sören von Rönne in 2010

Personal information
- Nationality: German
- Born: 13 July 1962 (age 62); Uetersen, West Germany

Sport
- Sport: Equestrian

Sören von Rönne (born 13 July 1962) is a German former equestrian. He competed in two events at the 1992 Summer Olympics.
