= Yu Jeong-jae =

South Korean equestrian

Personal information
- Nationality: South Korean
- Born: 24 November 1970 (age 54)

Sport
- Sport: Equestrian

Yu Jeong-jae (born 24 November 1970) is a South Korean equestrian. He competed in two events at the 1992 Summer Olympics.
