= Ebrahim Alidokht =

Iranian table tennis player

Personal information
- Nationality: Iran
- Born: 26 October 1967 (age 57); Tabriz, Iran

Sport
- Sport: Table tennis

Ebrahim Alidokht (Persian: ابراهیم علیدخت, born 26 October 1967) is an Iranian table tennis player. He competed in the 1992 Summer Olympics.
