= Norman Dello Joio (equestrian) =

American equestrian

Medal record

Equestrian

Representing the United States

Olympic Games
Bronze medal – third place	1992 Barcelona	Individual jumping

Pan American Games
Gold medal – first place	1979 San Juan	Team jumping

Norman Dello Joio (born June 7, 1956) is an American equestrian and Olympic medalist. He was born in New York City. He qualified for the 1980 U.S. Olympic team but did not compete due to the U.S. Olympic Committee's boycott of the 1980 Summer Olympics in Moscow, Russia. Dello Joio was one of 461 athletes to receive a Congressional Gold Medal instead. He won a bronze medal in show jumping at the 1992 Summer Olympics in Barcelona.

He is the son of late composer Norman Dello Joio.
