= Mikhail Rybak =

Belarusian equestrian

Personal information
- Nationality: Belarusian
- Born: 26 August 1963 (age 61); Minsk, Belarus

Sport
- Sport: Equestrian

Mikhail Rybak (born 26 August 1963) is a Belarusian equestrian. He competed in two events at the 1992 Summer Olympics.
