= Jean-Jacques Boisson =

French equestrian

Personal information
- Nationality: French
- Born: 25 July 1956 (age 69) Niort, France

Sport
- Sport: Equestrian
Medal record
Equestrian
Representing France
European Championships
Bronze medal – third place	1991 Punchestown	Team eventing

Jean-Jacques Boisson (born 25 July 1956) is a French former equestrian. He competed in two events at the 1992 Summer Olympics.
