= Fiona van Tuyll =

Dutch equestrian

Personal information
- Full name: Fiona Henrietta Emilie van Tuyll van Serooskerken
- Nationality: Dutch
- Born: 29 May 1964 (age 62) London, England

Sport
- Sport: Equestrian
Medal record
Equestrian
Representing the Netherlands
European Championships
Silver medal – second place	1989 Burghley	Team eventing

Fiona Henrietta Emilie "Fieps" van Tuyll van Serooskerken (born 29 May 1964) is a Dutch equestrian. She competed in the individual eventing at the 1992 Summer Olympics.
