= Zsolt Bubán =

Hungarian equestrian

Personal information
- Nationality: Hungarian
- Born: 10 February 1962 (age 63); Nyíregyháza, Hungary

Sport
- Sport: Equestrian

Zsolt Bubán (born 10 February 1962) is a Hungarian equestrian. He competed in two events at the 1992 Summer Olympics.
