= Attila Ling =

Hungarian equestrian

Personal information
- Nationality: Hungarian
- Born: 26 November 1962 (age 62); Nyíregyháza, Hungary

Sport
- Sport: Equestrian

Attila Ling (born 26 November 1962) is a Hungarian equestrian. He competed in two events at the 1992 Summer Olympics.
