= Jacek Krukowski =

Polish equestrian

Personal information
- Nationality: Polish
- Born: 25 August 1969 (age 55); Kwidzyn, Poland

Sport
- Sport: Equestrian

Jacek Krukowski (born 25 August 1969) is a Polish equestrian. He competed in two events at the 1992 Summer Olympics.
