= Michel Bouquet (equestrian) =

French equestrian

Personal information
- Nationality: French
- Born: 13 July 1951 (age 73); Aubervilliers, France

Sport
- Sport: Equestrian

Michel Bouquet (born 13 July 1951) is a French equestrian. He competed in two events at the 1992 Summer Olympics.
