= Jil Walton =

American equestrian

Personal information
- Born: July 5, 1966 (age 58); Arcadia, California, United States

Sport
- Sport: Equestrian

Jil Walton (born July 5, 1966) is an American equestrian. She competed in two events at the 1992 Summer Olympics.
