= Matthew Ryan (equestrian) =

Australian equestrian (born 1964)

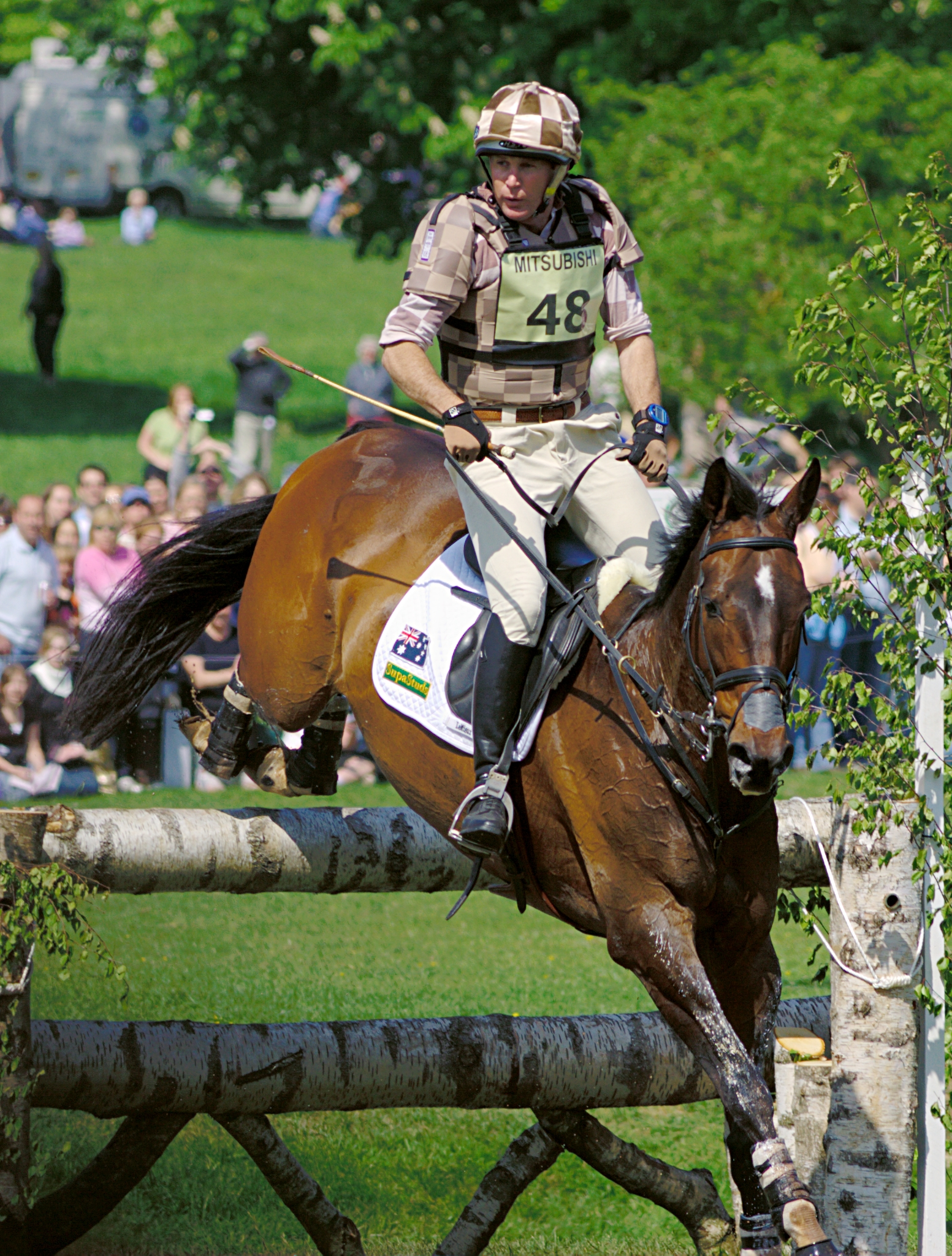
- Matt Ryan (2007)

Medal record

Equestrian

Representing Australia

Olympic Games
Gold medal – first place	1992 Barcelona	Individual eventing
Gold medal – first place	1992 Barcelona	Team eventing
Gold medal – first place	2000 Sydney	Team eventing

Matthew Morgan "Matt" Ryan, OAM (born 3 June 1964 in Sydney, New South Wales) is an Olympic-level equestrian rider. He is a triple Olympic gold medalist who competed for Australia. Matt has three older brothers, including the internationally successful eventer and dressage rider, Heath Ryan. In 1984 he travelled to Britain to train with the great Richard Meade, before returning home the following year, and then went back to the UK in 1989 to set up a stable.

He has won three Olympic gold medals, two at the 1992 Summer Olympics in Barcelona and one at the 2000 Summer Olympics in Sydney. Additionally, he finished 8th at the 1992 Badminton Horse Trials, was selected for the 1996 Atlanta Olympics (but had to withdraw a few days before competition due to horse injury), and was the reserve rider for the 2004 Athens Olympics.

His two gold medal-winning horses, Kibah Tic Toc and Sandstone, were bred by Bridget Hyem, Australia's first female Olympic equestrian competitor.

A few of his other major Badminton Horse Trials results are: 2nd 1995 Kibah Tic Toc, 4th 2007 Bonza Katoomba, 8th 2008 Bonza Puzzle. One of his up-and-coming young horses is Bonza Kingscanyon, who is being campaigned at novice level.

Matt has a daughter called Millie and a dog called Wombat. He had a previous marriage with Nikki Ryan, also an eventer and current 5* eventing trainer.

Ryan was inducted into the Sport Australia Hall of Fame in 2000.

Ryan appeared in Episode 4 Series 4 of the British reality TV show, The Hotel, as a guest on a family holiday in Torquay, UK where he opened the beach party.
