= José Maurer (equestrian) =

Mexican equestrian

Personal information
- Nationality: Mexican
- Born: 21 October 1951 (age 73)

Sport
- Sport: Equestrian

José Maurer (born 21 October 1951) is a Mexican equestrian. He competed in two events at the 1992 Summer Olympics.
