= Robert Stevenson (equestrian) =

Canadian equestrian

Personal information
- Born: 7 December 1968 (age 56); Fredericton, New Brunswick, Canada

Sport
- Sport: Equestrian

Robert Stevenson (born 7 December 1968) is a Canadian equestrian. He competed in two events at the 1992 Summer Olympics.
