= Jorge Matias =

Portuguese equestrian

Personal information
- Nationality: Portuguese
- Born: 14 March 1957; Lisbon, Portugal
- Died: 27 June 2001 (aged 44)

Sport
- Sport: Equestrian

Jorge Matias (14 March 1957 – 27 June 2001) was a Portuguese equestrian. He competed in the individual jumping event at the 1992 Summer Olympics.
