= Artur Costa (swimmer) =

Portuguese swimmer

Personal information
- Born: 26 April 1970 (age 56) Lisbon, Portugal

Sport
- Sport: Swimming

Artur Costa (born 26 April 1970) is a Portuguese former swimmer. He competed at the 1988 Summer Olympics and the 1992 Summer Olympics.
