= Noel Lynch (archer) =

Irish archer (born 1955)

Personal information
- Nationality: Irish
- Born: 8 October 1955 (age 69)

Sport
- Sport: Archery

Noel Lynch (born 8 October 1955) is an Irish archer. He competed at the 1988 Summer Olympics and the 1992 Summer Olympics.
