= Hirosuke Tomizawa =

Japanese equestrian

Personal information
- Nationality: Japanese
- Born: 16 April 1962 (age 62); Tokyo, Japan

Sport
- Sport: Equestrian

Hirosuke Tomizawa (born 16 April 1962) is a Japanese equestrian. He competed in two events at the 1992 Summer Olympics.
