= Anna Herrmann (politician) =

German politician

Anna Herrmann (née Peetz; 15 November 1892 - 1980) was a German SPD politician, active in her birthplace of Herzogenaurach, where there is now a street named after her.

== Life ==
Her father ran a textile factory on the Aurach. In 1913 she married the upholsterer Georg Herrmann and together they ran the town's 'Volkshaus', used as a restaurant and meeting hall by the labour movement.

She successfully stood for the city council in 1946 and was re-elected five more times between then and 1966. In 1956 she was also elected to the 'Kreistag' or district assembly for the former Landkreises Höchstadt an der Aisch and between 1961 and 1966 she twice became mayor of Herzogenaurach.

== Awards ==
- 1970 Honorary Citizen of the Town of Herzogenaurach
- 1972 Herzogenaurach-Medaille for services to the community
