= Arkadiusz Bachur =

Polish equestrian

Arkadiusz
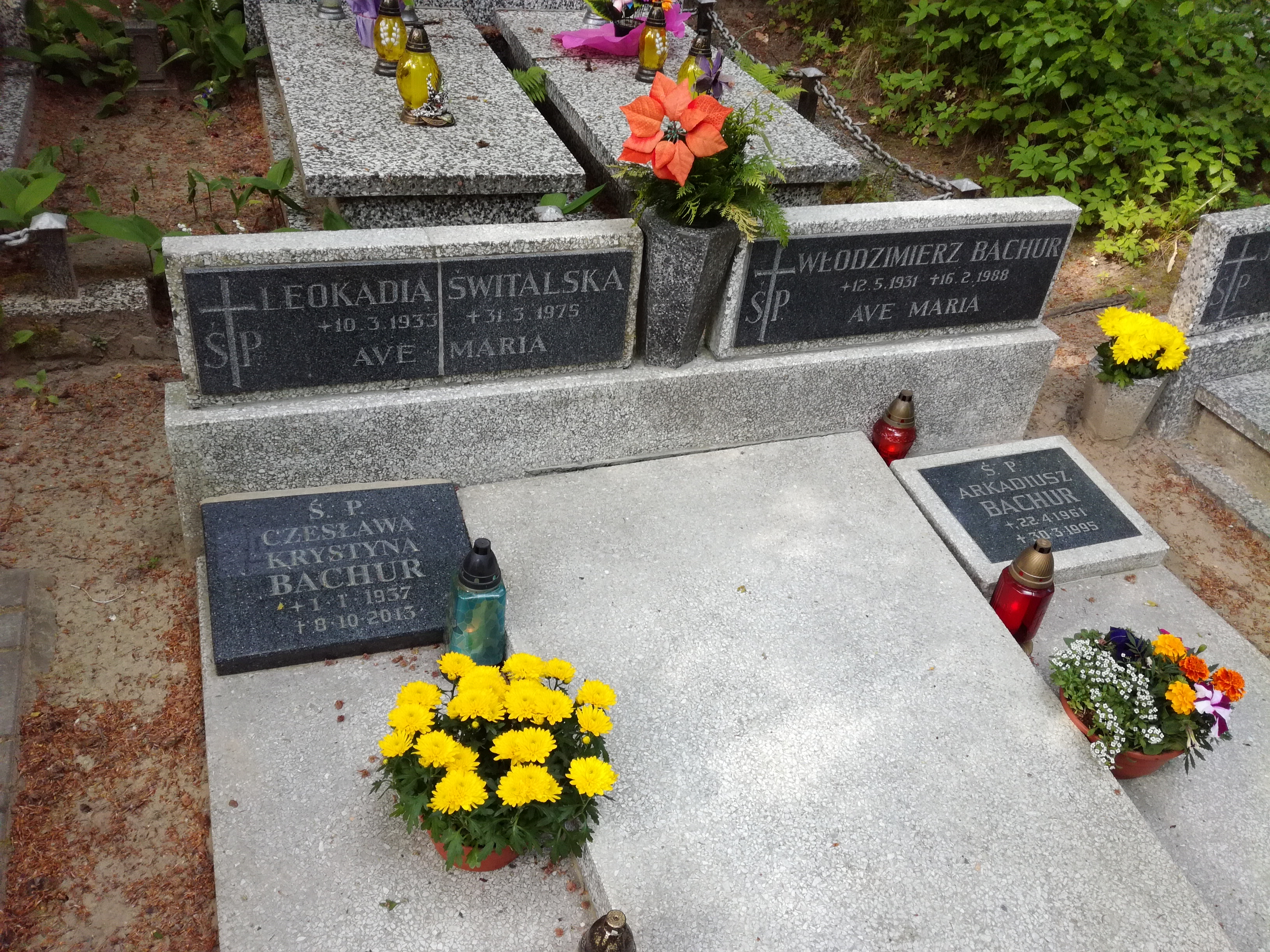

Personal information
- Full name: Arkadiusz Bachur
- Nationality: Polish
- Born: 22 April 1961; Gdynia, Poland
- Died: 30 March 1995 (aged 33); Drzonków, Poland

Sport
- Sport: olympics Equestrian

Arkadiusz Stefan Bachur (22 April 1961 – 30 March 1995) was a Polish equestrian. He competed in two events at the 1992 Summer Olympics.
