= David Rissik =

South African equestrian

Personal information
- Nationality: South African
- Born: 10 December 1969 (age 55)

Sport
- Sport: Equestrian

David Rissik (born 10 December 1969) is a South African equestrian. He competed in the individual eventing at the 1992 Summer Olympics.
