= Anchela Rohof =

Dutch equestrian

Personal information
- Nationality: Dutch
- Born: 26 February 1955 (age 70) Delden, Netherlands

Sport
- Sport: Equestrian

Anchela Rohof (born 26 February 1955) is a Dutch equestrian. She competed in two events at the 1992 Summer Olympics.
