= Vilmos Göttler =

Hungarian equestrian

Personal information
- Nationality: Hungarian
- Born: 22 December 1951 (age 74) Békéscsaba, Hungary

Sport
- Sport: Equestrian

Vilmos Göttler (born 22 December 1951) is a Hungarian equestrian. He competed in the individual jumping event at the 1992 Summer Olympics.
