= Martin Lips =

Dutch equestrian

Personal information
- Nationality: Dutch
- Born: 3 February 1955 (age 71) Geertruidenberg, Netherlands

Sport
- Sport: Equestrian

Martin Lips (born 3 February 1955) is a Dutch equestrian. He competed in two events at the 1992 Summer Olympics.
