= Fernando Villalón (equestrian) =

Spanish equestrian

Personal information
- Nationality: Spanish
- Born: 18 March 1963 (age 62); Madrid, Spain

Sport
- Sport: Equestrian

Fernando Villalón (born 18 March 1963) is a Spanish equestrian. He competed in two events at the 1992 Summer Olympics.
