= Paul Slane (cyclist) =

Irish cyclist

Personal information
- Born: 19 June 1970 (age 56)

Cycling career
- Sport: Cycling

Paul Slane (born 19 June 1970) is an Irish former cyclist. He competed in two events at the 1992 Summer Olympics.
