= Staffan Lidbeck =

Swedish equestrian

Personal information
- Nationality: Swedish
- Born: 12 June 1968 (age 56); Stockholm, Sweden

Sport
- Sport: Equestrian

Staffan Lidbeck (born 12 June 1968) is a Swedish equestrian. He competed in two events at the 1992 Summer Olympics.
