= Werbrouck =

Werbrouck is a surname. Notable people with the surname include:

- Joseph Werbrouck (1882–1974), Belgian track cyclist
- Marcelle Werbrouck (1889–1959), Belgian Egyptologist
- Ulla Werbrouck (born 1972), Belgian politician and judoka
