= Negenharrie =

- Municipality
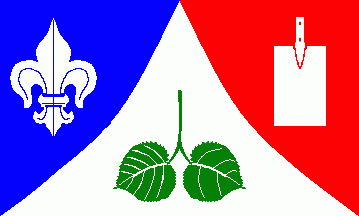
- Flag Coat of arms

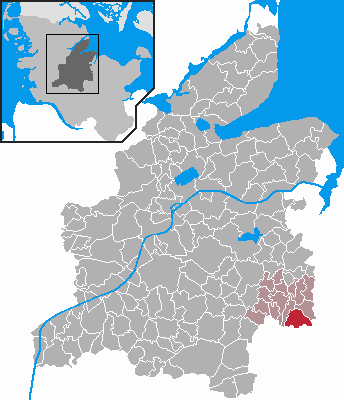
- Location of Negenharrie within Rendsburg-Eckernförde district
- Interactive map of Negenharrie
- Location within Germany Location within Schleswig-Holstein
- Coordinates: 54°8′43″N 10°4′39″E
- Country: Germany
- State: Schleswig-Holstein
- District: Rendsburg-Eckernförde
- Municipal assoc.: Bordesholm

Government
  - Mayor: Hans-Jürgen Leptien

Area
  - Total: 12.43 km^{2} (4.80 sq mi)
- Elevation: 39 m (128 ft)

Population (2025-12-31)
  - Total: 368
  - Density: 29.6/km^{2} (76.7/sq mi)
- Time zone: UTC+01:00 (CET)
  - Summer (DST): UTC+02:00 (CEST)
- Postal codes: 24625
- Dialling codes: 04322, 04394
- Vehicle registration: RD
- Website: www.bordesholm.de

Negenharrie is a municipality in the district of Rendsburg-Eckernförde, in Schleswig-Holstein, Germany.
