= Oleg Karpov =

Soviet equestrian

Personal information
- Nationality: Soviet
- Born: 11 September 1965 (age 59)

Sport
- Sport: Equestrian

Oleg Karpov (born 11 September 1965) is a Soviet equestrian. He competed in two events at the 1992 Summer Olympics.
