= Todd Trewin =

American equestrian

Personal information
- Born: April 20, 1958 (age 68) Seattle, Washington, United States

Sport
- Sport: Equestrian

Todd Trewin (born April 20, 1958) is an American equestrian. He competed in two events at the 1992 Summer Olympics.

In June 2024, he received a recorded warning by the FEI for "abuse of horse: excessive use of whip, bit and/or spurs" for his actions at the Yelm Horse Trials.
