= Erik Duvander =

Swedish equestrian (born 1962)

Personal information
- Nationality: Swedish
- Born: 23 February 1962 (age 64) Chicago, Illinois, United States

Sport
- Sport: Equestrian
Medal record
Equestrian
Representing Sweden
European Championships
| Gold medal – first place | 1993 Achselschwang | Team eventing |

Erik Duvander (born 23 February 1962) is a Swedish equestrian. He competed in the individual eventing at the 1992 Summer Olympics.
