= Miguel Cabrita =

Portuguese swimmer (born 1974)

Personal information
- Born: 30 September 1974 (age 51) Tavira, Portugal

Sport
- Sport: Swimming

Miguel Cabrita (born 30 September 1974) is a Portuguese former butterfly swimmer. He competed at the 1992 Summer Olympics and the 1996 Summer Olympics.
