= Evelyne Blaton =

Belgian equestrian

Personal information
- Nationality: Belgian
- Born: 17 September 1961 (age 63); Brussels, Belgium

Sport
- Sport: Equestrian

Evelyne Blaton (born 17 September 1961) is a Belgian equestrian. She competed in two events at the 1992 Summer Olympics.
