= Karin Donckers =

Belgian equestrian

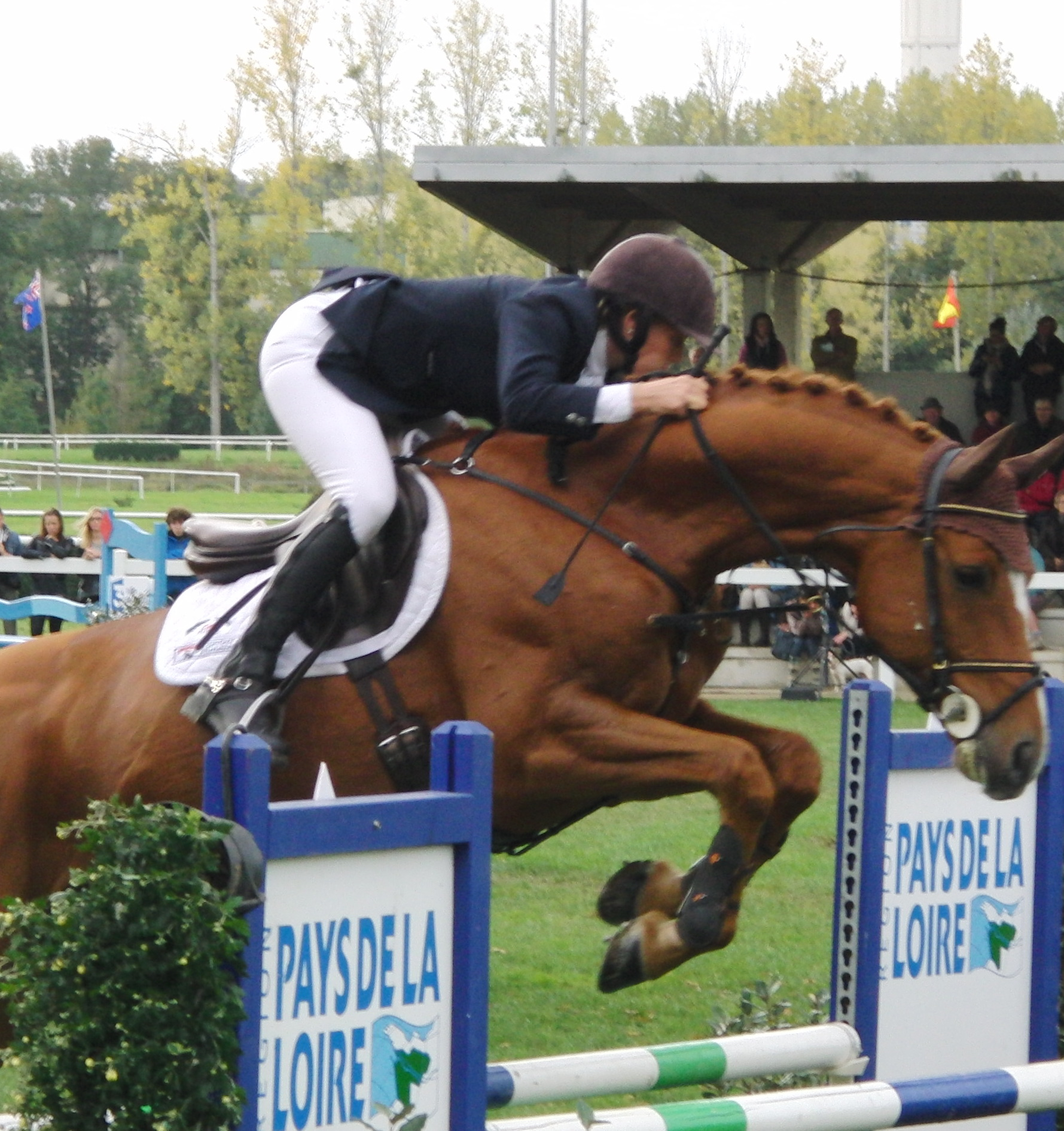
- Donckers in 2013

Personal information
- Born: 28 May 1971 (age 55); Hoogstraten, Belgium
- Height: 168 cm (5 ft 6 in)
Medal record
Equestrian
Representing Belgium
European Championships
Bronze medal – third place	2003 Punchestown	Team eventing
Bronze medal – third place	2009 Fontainebleau	Team eventing

Karin Donckers (born 28 May 1971) is a Belgian equestrian who competes in eventing. She has competed at seven Olympic Games between 1992 and 2024 (having missed 1996 and 2020). Her best result was fourth place in the team competition in 1992 and 2024. She has also twice finished in the top ten of the individual competition, with eighth in 1992 and ninth in 2008.
