= Jörg Münzner =

Austrian equestrian (born 1960)

Medal record

Equestrian

Representing Austria

Olympic Games
Silver medal – second place	1992 Barcelona	Team jumping

Jörg Münzner (born 14 July 1960) is an Austrian equestrian and Olympic medalist. He was born in Hamburg. He won a silver medal in show jumping at the 1992 Summer Olympics in Barcelona, the only games that Jörg competed in.
