= Joana Arantes =

Portuguese swimmer

Personal information
- Born: 11 August 1972 (age 53) Lisbon, Portugal

Sport
- Sport: Swimming

Joana Arantes (born 11 August 1972) is a Portuguese swimmer. She competed in two events at the 1992 Summer Olympics.
