= Anna Hilton =

Swedish equestrian (born 1963)

Personal information
- Full name: Anna Maria Hilton
- Nationality: Swedish
- Born: Anna Maria Hermann; 17 February 1963 (age 63) Lidingö, Stockholm, Sweden

Sport
- Sport: Equestrian
Medal record
Equestrian
Representing Sweden
European Championships
Gold medal – first place	1993 Achselschwang	Team eventing
Silver medal – second place	1997 Burghley	Team eventing

Anna Maria Hilton (née Hermann, born 17 February 1963) is a Swedish equestrian. She competed in the individual eventing at the 1992 Summer Olympics.
