= Boris Boor =

Austrian equestrian (born 1950)

Medal record

Equestrian

Representing Austria

Olympic Games
Silver medal – second place	1992 Barcelona	Team jumping

Boris Boor (born 12 December 1950) is an Austrian equestrian and Olympic medalist. He was born in Bratislava. He won a silver medal in show jumping at the 1992 Summer Olympics in Barcelona.
