= Matthias Baumann =

German equestrian (born 1963)

Medal record

Equestrian

Representing West Germany

Olympic Games
Gold medal – first place	1988 Seoul	Team eventing

Representing Germany

Olympic Games
Bronze medal – third place	1992 Barcelona	Team eventing

World Championships
Bronze medal – third place	1990 Stockholm	Team eventing

Matthias Andreas Baumann (born 5 April 1963 in Munich) is a German equestrian and Olympic champion. He won a team gold medal in eventing at the 1988 Summer Olympics in Seoul.
