= Vasco Ramires Jr. =

Portuguese equestrian

Personal information
- Nationality: Portuguese
- Born: 28 September 1964 (age 60); Lisbon, Portugal

Sport
- Sport: Equestrian

Vasco Ramires Jr. (born 28 September 1964) is a Portuguese equestrian. He competed in two events at the 1992 Summer Olympics.
