= Ana Barros (swimmer) =

Portuguese swimmer

Personal information
- Born: 5 September 1969 (age 56) Lisbon, Portugal

Sport
- Sport: Swimming

Ana Barros (born 5 September 1969) is a Portuguese former breaststroke swimmer. She competed in two events at the 1992 Summer Olympics.
