= Máiréad Curran =

Irish equestrian (born 1964)

Personal information
- Nationality: Irish
- Born: 19 February 1964 (age 61)

Sport
- Sport: Equestrian

Máiréad Curran (born 19 February 1964) is an Irish equestrian. She competed in two events at the 1992 Summer Olympics.
