= Alberto Rodrigues (equestrian) =

Portuguese equestrian

Personal information
- Full name: Alberto Bernardo de Azevedo Leite Rodrigues
- Nationality: Portuguese
- Born: 15 September 1945; Aveiro, Portugal
- Died: 24 February 2025 (aged 79)

Sport
- Sport: Equestrian

Alberto Bernardo de Azevedo Leite Rodrigues (15 September 1945 – 24 February 2025) was a Portuguese equestrian. He competed in two events at the 1992 Summer Olympics.
