= Santiago de la Rocha =

Spanish equestrian

Personal information
- Nationality: Spanish
- Born: 19 April 1952 (age 72); Madrid, Spain

Sport
- Sport: Equestrian

Santiago de la Rocha (born 19 April 1952) is a Spanish equestrian. He competed at the 1988 Summer Olympics and the 1992 Summer Olympics.
