= Jef Desmedt =

Belgian equestrian

Personal information
- Nationality: Belgian
- Born: 29 March 1972 (age 52); Brecht, Belgium

Sport
- Sport: Equestrian

Jef Desmedt (born 29 March 1972) is a Belgian former equestrian. He competed in the individual eventing at the 1992 Summer Olympics.
