= Ana Alegria =

Portuguese swimmer

Personal information
- Born: 11 March 1977 (age 49) Durban, South Africa

Sport
- Sport: Swimming

Ana Feio de Gama Alegria (born 11 March 1977) is a Portuguese swimmer. She competed at the 1992 Summer Olympics and the 1996 Summer Olympics.
