= Vicky Latta =

New Zealand equestrian

Personal information
- Full name: Victoria Latta
- Born: 10 June 1951 (age 75); Auckland, New Zealand
- Horses: Chief; Broadcast News
Medal record
Equestrian
Representing New Zealand
Olympic Games
Silver medal – second place	1992 Barcelona	Team eventing
Bronze medal – third place	1996 Atlanta	Team eventing

Victoria Latta (born 10 June 1951 in Auckland), known as Vicky, is a New Zealand horsewoman who won two medals at the Olympic Games.

Latta's first major international performance was 11th at the 1990 World Equestrian Games in Stockholm riding Chief. At the 1992 Olympics in Barcelona she was in the New Zealand team which gained the Silver medal. In the individual event Latta, riding Chief, knocked down one rail in the showjumping to slip to fourth place behind fellow-New Zealander Blyth Tait. At the 1996 Olympics in Atlanta Latta, riding Broadcast News, was in the team which won the Bronze medal despite a serious fall during the cross-country which caused her to fail to finish the event.

== Biography ==
While at school Latta won a place at the Royal Ballet School. She later qualified as lawyer before taking equestrianism seriously. After retiring from competitive eventing following the 1996 Olympics Latta returned to the law profession and gained a master's degree. She is also a member of the International Olympic Academy.
