= James Kernan =

Irish equestrian

Personal information
- Nationality: Irish
- Born: 9 April 1958 (age 66)

Sport
- Sport: Equestrian

James Kernan (born 9 April 1958) is an Irish equestrian. He competed in two events at the 1992 Summer Olympics.
