= Melanie Duff =

Irish equestrian

Personal information
- Nationality: Irish
- Born: 31 October 1961 (age 64)

Sport
- Sport: Equestrian
Medal record
Equestrian
Representing Ireland
European Championships
Bronze medal – third place	1989 Burghley	Team eventing

Melanie Duff (born 31 October 1961) is an Irish equestrian. She competed in two events at the 1992 Summer Olympics.
