= Herbert Blöcker =

German equestrian (1943–2014)

Medal record

Equestrian

Representing West Germany

World Championships
Silver medal – second place	1978 Lexington	Team eventing
Silver medal – second place	1982 Luhmühlen	Team eventing
Bronze medal – third place	1974 Burghley	Team eventing

European Championships
Gold medal – first place	1973 Kiev	Team eventing
Silver medal – second place	1973 Kiev	Individual eventing
Silver medal – second place	1999 Luhmühlen	Team eventing
Bronze medal – third place	1975 Luhmühlen	Team eventing

Representing Germany

Olympic Games
Silver medal – second place	1992 Barcelona	Individual eventing
Bronze medal – third place	1992 Barcelona	Team eventing

World Championships
Bronze medal – third place	1990 Stockholm	Team eventing

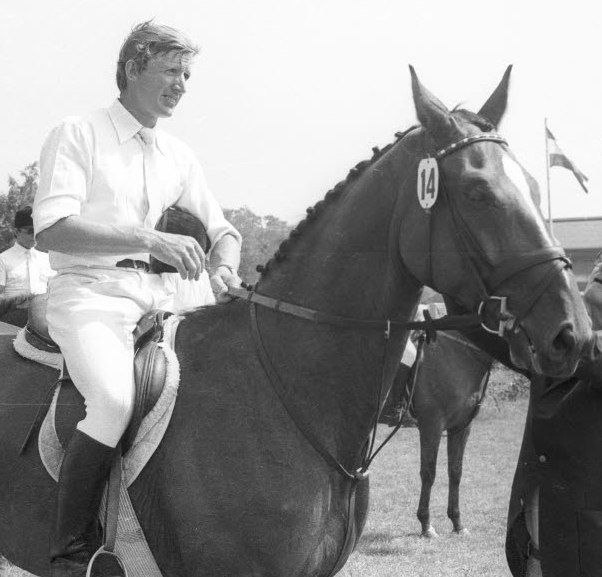
Herbert Blöcker in 1978

Herbert Blöcker (1 January 1943 in Fiefharrie – 15 February 2014) was a German equestrian and 3-time Olympic medalist. He was born in Schleswig-Holstein. He won a silver medal at the Olympics in Fontainebleau in 1980 following by winning another silver in eventing at the 1992 Summer Olympics in Barcelona. During the same Olympic games, he won a bronze medal also in the team event. He also participated in the 1996 Summer Olympics in Atlanta, Georgia. In 2008, both he and his Olympic horse, "Feine Dame", were inducted into the International Association of Eventing Hall of Fame. Blöcker died of cancer on 15 February 2014 at the age of 71 in Elmshorn.
