= António Bráz =

Portuguese equestrian

Personal information
- Full name: António Valente da Gama Bráz
- Nationality: Portuguese
- Born: 8 December 1962 (age 62); Elvas, Portugal

Sport
- Sport: Equestrian

António Valente da Gama Bráz (born 8 December 1962) is a Portuguese equestrian. He competed in two events at the 1992 Summer Olympics.
