= Thomas Frühmann =

Austrian equestrian

Medal record

Equestrian

Representing Austria

Olympic Games
Silver medal – second place	1992 Barcelona	Team jumping

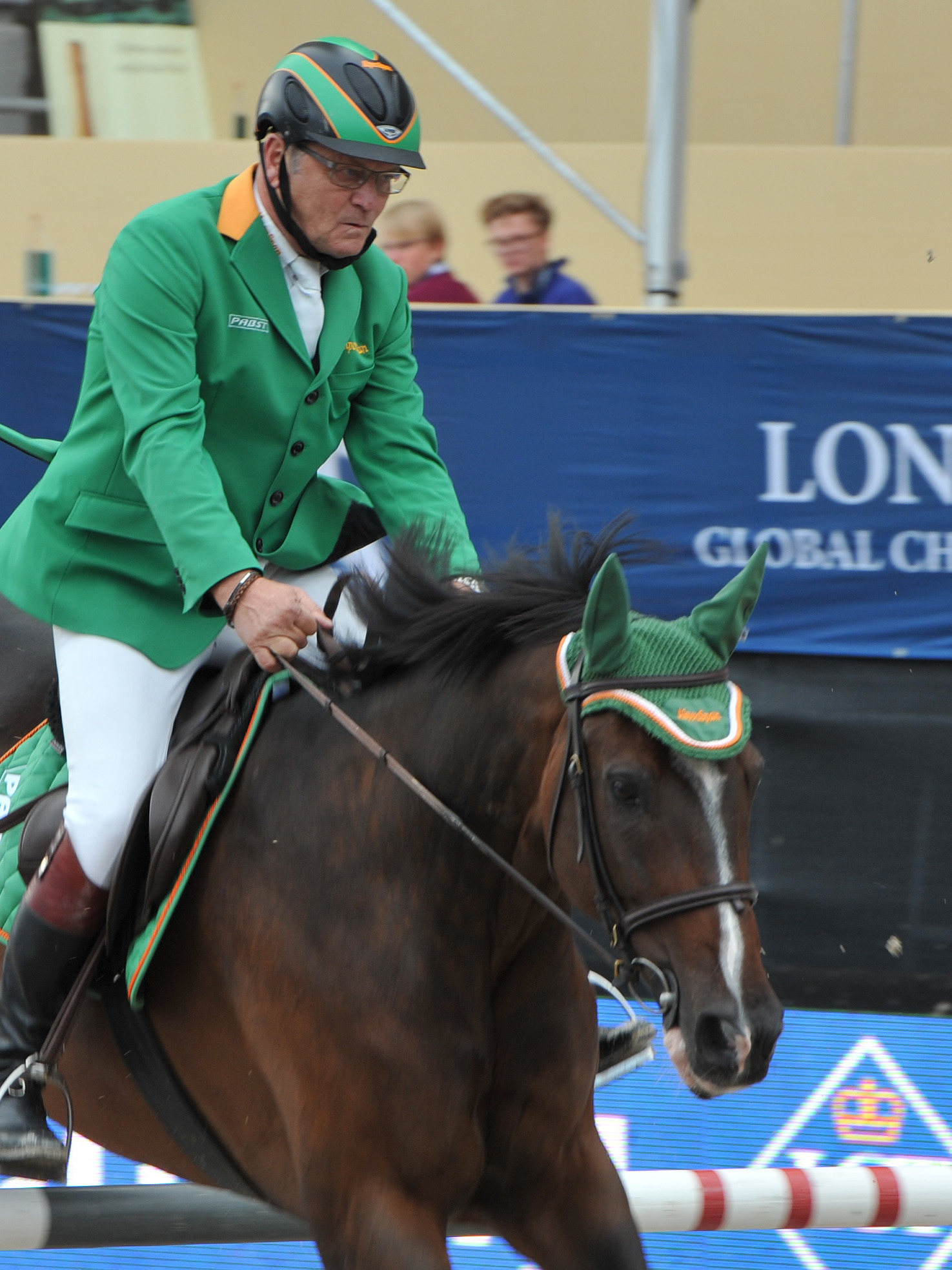
Vienna Masters am 21. September 2013 CSI* - Final Gold Tour Thomas Frühmann (AUT) auf The Sixth Sense

Thomas Frühmann (born 23 January 1953) is an Austrian equestrian and Olympic medalist. He was born in Vienna. He won a silver medal in show jumping at the 1992 Summer Olympics in Barcelona.
