= David Green (equestrian) =

Australian equestrian (born 1960)

Personal information
- Nationality: Australian
- Born: 28 February 1960 (age 66) Brisbane, Queensland

Sport
- Sport: Equestrian
Medal record
Equestrian
Representing Australia
Olympic Games
| Gold medal – first place | 1992 Barcelona | Team eventing |

David Michael Green (born 28 February 1960 in Brisbane, Queensland) is an Australian equestrian and Olympic champion. He won a team gold medal in eventing at the 1992 Summer Olympics in Barcelona.
