= Cord Mysegaes =

German equestrian

Medal record

Equestrian

Representing Germany

Olympic Games
Bronze medal – third place	1992 Barcelona	Team eventing

World Championships
Bronze medal – third place	1994 The Hague	Team eventing

Cord Mysegaes (born 22 March 1968) is a German equestrian and Olympic medalist. He was born in Niedersachsen. He won a bronze medal in team eventing at the 1992 Summer Olympics in Barcelona.
