= Polly Holohan =

Irish equestrian

Personal information
- Nationality: Irish
- Born: 4 July 1959 (age 66)

Sport
- Sport: Equestrian
Medal record
Equestrian
Representing Ireland
European Championships
Silver medal – second place	1991 Punchestown	Team eventing
Bronze medal – third place	1989 Burghley	Team eventing

Olivia "Polly" Holohan (born 4 July 1959) is an Irish equestrian. She competed in two events at the 1992 Summer Olympics.
