= Dirk Van Der Elst =

Belgian equestrian

Personal information
- Nationality: Belgian
- Born: 6 August 1965 (age 59); Aarschot, Belgium

Sport
- Sport: Equestrian

Dirk Van Der Elst (born 6 August 1965) is a Belgian former equestrian. He competed in two events at the 1992 Summer Olympics.
