= Kevin Kimmage =

Irish cyclist

Personal information
- Born: 5 May 1967 (age 59)

Cycling career
- Sport: Cycling

Kevin Kimmage (born 5 May 1967) is an Irish former cyclist. He competed in two events at the 1992 Summer Olympics.
