= Club Hípic El Montanyà =

Spanish horse club

Coordinates: 41°48′16.11″N 2°15′30.81″E

The Club Hípic El Montanyà (English: El Montanyà Horse Club) is a Spanish horse club, located in the comarca of Osona, Catalonia. For the 1992 Summer Olympics in neighboring Barcelona, it hosted the equestrian dressage and the cross country part of the eventing competitions.

The venue was constructed on a golf course in 1991 over 200 ha (490 acres).
