= Ralf Ehrenbrink =

German equestrian (born 1960)

Medal record

Equestrian

Representing West Germany

Olympic Games
| Gold medal – first place | 1988 Seoul | Team eventing |

European Championships
| Silver medal – second place | 1987 Luhmühlen | Team eventing |
| Bronze medal – third place | 1985 Burghley | Team eventing |

Representing Germany

Olympic Games
| Bronze medal – third place | 1992 Barcelona | Team eventing |

World Championships
| Bronze medal – third place | 1994 The Hague | Team eventing |

Ralf Ehrenbrink (born 29 August 1960 in Bielefeld, Nordrhein-Westfalen) is a German equestrian and Olympic champion. He won a team gold medal in eventing at the 1988 Summer Olympics in Seoul.
