= Francesco Girardi =

Italian equestrian

Personal information
- Nationality: Italian
- Born: 1 November 1966 (age 58); Rome, Italy

Sport
- Sport: Equestrian

Francesco Girardi (born 1 November 1966) is an Italian equestrian. He competed at the 1988 Summer Olympics and the 1992 Summer Olympics.
