= António Ramos =

Portuguese equestrian

Personal information
- Nationality: Portuguese
- Born: 24 April 1950 (age 74); Lisbon, Portugal

Sport
- Sport: Equestrian

António Ramos (born 24 April 1950) is a Portuguese equestrian. He competed in two events at the 1992 Summer Olympics.
