= Willy Sneyers =

Belgian equestrian

Personal information
- Nationality: Belgian
- Born: 24 February 1950 (age 75); Diest, Belgium

Sport
- Sport: Equestrian

Willy Sneyers (born 24 February 1950) is a Belgian former equestrian. He competed in two events at the 1992 Summer Olympics.
