= Eric Smiley =

Irish equestrian

Personal information
- Nationality: Irish
- Born: 28 June 1951 (age 75) Belfast, Northern Ireland

Sport
- Sport: Equestrian
Medal record
Equestrian
Representing Ireland
European Championships
Bronze medal – third place	1993 Achselschwang	Team eventing
Bronze medal – third place	1995 Pratoni del Vivaro	Team eventing

Eric Smiley (born 28 June 1951) is an Irish former equestrian. He competed at the 1992 Summer Olympics and the 1996 Summer Olympics.
