= Equestrian events at the 1992 Summer Olympics =

Equestrian at the Games of the XXV Olympiad
- Venue: Real Club de Polo de Barcelona; Club Hípic El Montanyà
- Dates: 28 July – 9 August 1992
- No. of events: 6
- Competitors: 217 from 35 nations

The equestrian events at the 1992 Barcelona Olympics included dressage, eventing, and show jumping. All three disciplines had both individual and team competitions.

== Medal summary ==
Event	Gold	Silver	Bronze
Individual dressage	Nicole Uphoff on Rembrandt; Germany	Isabell Werth on Gigolo; Germany	Klaus Balkenhol on Goldstern; Germany
Team dressage	Germany; Klaus Balkenhol and Goldstern; Nicole Uphoff and Rembrandt; Monica Theodorescu and Grunox; Isabell Werth and Gigolo	Netherlands; Tineke Bartels and Courage; Anky van Grunsven and Bonfire; Ellen Bontje and Larius; Annemarie Sanders and Montreux	United States; Robert Dover and Lectron; Carol Lavell and Gifted; Charlotte Bredahl and Monsieur; Michael Poulin and Graf George
Individual eventing	Matthew Ryan on Kibah Tic Toc; Australia	Herbert Blocker on Feine Dame; Germany	Blyth Tait on Messiah; New Zealand
Team eventing	Australia; David Green and Duncan II; Gillian Rolton and Peppermint Grove; Andrew Hoy and Kiwi; Matthew Ryan and Kibah Tic Toc	New Zealand; Blyth Tait and Messiah; Andrew Nicholson and Spinning Rhombus; Mark Todd and Welton Greylag; Victoria Latta and Chief	Germany; Herbert Blöcker and Feine Dame; Ralf Ehrenbrink and Kildare II; Matthias Baumann and Alabaster; Cord Mysegages and Ricardo
Individual jumping	Ludger Beerbaum on Classic Touch; Germany	Piet Raymakers on Ratina Z Netherlands	Norman Dello Joio on Irish; United States
Team jumping	Netherlands; Piet Raijmakers and Ratina Z Bert Romp and Waldo E Jan Tops and Top Gun; Jos Lansink and Egano	Austria; Boris Boor and Love Me Tender; Jörg Münzner and Graf Grande; Hugo Simon and Apricot D Thomas Frühmann and Genius	France; Hervé Godignon and Quidam de Revel; Hubert Bourdy and Razzina du Poncel; Michel Robert and Nonix; Eric Navet and Quito de Baussy

== Medals ==
Rank	Nation	Gold	Silver	Bronze	Total
1	Germany	3	2	2	7
2	Australia	2	0	0	2
3	Netherlands	1	2	0	3
4	New Zealand	0	1	1	2
5	Austria	0	1	0	1
6	United States	0	0	2	2
7	France	0	0	1	1
Totals (7 entries)		6	6	6	18

== Officials ==
Appointment of officials was as follows:

Dressage

- (Switzerland) Wolfgang Niggli (Ground Jury President)
- (New Zealand) Nicholas Williams (Ground Jury Member)
- (Germany) Uwe Mechlem (Ground Jury Member)
- (Japan) Eizo Osaka (Ground Jury Member)
- (Sweden) Eric Lette (Ground Jury Member)

Jumping

- (Spain) José Alvarez de Bohorques (Ground Jury President)
- (United States) William C. Steinkraus (Ground Jury Member)
- (Austria) Franz Pranter (Ground Jury Member)
- (Sweden) Bo Helander (Ground Jury Member)
- (Spain) Nicholas Alvarez de Bohorques (Course Designer)
- (Venezuela) Noel Vanososte (Technical Delegate)

Eventing

- (Republic of Ireland) Patrick Conolly-Carew (Ground Jury President)
- (United Kingdom) Bernd Springorum (Ground Jury Member)
- (Italy) Giovanni Grignolo (Ground Jury Member)
- (Germany) Wolfgang Feld (Course Designer)
- (United Kingdom) Michael Tucker (Technical Delegate)

== Participating nations ==
- Australia (5)
- Austria (5)
- Belgium (8)
- Bermuda (3)
- Brazil (6)
- Bulgaria (1)
- Canada (11)
- Colombia (3)
- Croatia (1)
- Czechoslovakia (1)
- Denmark (7)
- Egypt (1)
- Finland (1)
- France (12)
- Germany (12)
- Great Britain (12)
- Hungary (5)
- Ireland (9)
- Italy (12)
- Japan (9)
- Mexico (6)
- Netherlands (12)
- New Zealand (7)
- Norway (1)
- Philippines (1)
- Poland (4)
- Portugal (5)
- South Africa (3)
- South Korea (5)
- Spain (9)
- Sweden (12)
- Switzerland (7)
- Unified Team (8)
- United States (12)
- Virgin Islands (1)
