= Equestrian at the 1996 Summer Olympics – Team eventing =

Team eventing at the Games of the XXVI Olympiad
- Venue: Georgia International Horse Park
- Date: 21 July 1996 (dressage); 23 July 1996 (cross-country); 24 July 1996 (jumping)
- Competitors: 16 teams from 16 nations

Medalists
1st place, gold medalist(s)		Wendy Schaeffer; Phillip Dutton; Andrew Hoy; Gillian Rolton	Australia
2nd place, silver medalist(s)		David O'Connor; Bruce Davidson; Karen O'Connor; Jill Henneberg	United States
3rd place, bronze medalist(s)		Blyth Tait; Vaughn Jefferis; Andrew Nicholson; Vicky Latta	New Zealand

The team eventing event, part of the equestrian program at the 1996 Summer Olympics was held from 21 to 24 July 1996. The competition was held in the Georgia International Horse Park, in Conyers, Georgia. The team event was a separate event from the individual eventing. A rider could compete in both competitions (on different horses). Like all other equestrian events, the eventing competition was mixed gender, with both male and female athletes competing in the same division. 16 teams, each consisting of between three and four horse and rider pairs, entered the contest.

== Medalists ==
Gold:		Silver:		Bronze:	
Australia		United States		New Zealand	
Wendy Schaeffer	Sunburst	Karen O'Connor	Biko	Blyth Tait	Chesterfield
Phillip Dutton	True Blue Girdwood	David O'Connor	Giltedge	Andrew Nicholson	Jaegermeister II
Gillian Rolton	Peppermint Grove	Bruce Davidson	Heyday	Victoria Latta	Broadcast News
Andrew Hoy	Darien Powers	Jill Henneberg	Nirvana	Vaughn Jefferis	Bounce

== Results ==
=== Dressage ===
Each team consisted of four pairs of horse and rider. The penalty points of the lowest three pairs were added together to reach the team's penalty points.

Rank	NOC	Rider	Horse	Total Penalties	Scored	Team Penalties
1	United States	Karen O'Connor	Biko	39.60	#	123.00
1	United States	David O'Connor	Giltedge	40.80	#	123.00
1	United States	Bruce Davidson	Heyday	42.60	#	123.00
1	United States	Jill Henneberg	Nirvana	57.00		123.00
2	Great Britain	Ian Stark	Stanwick Ghost	35.20		127.80
2	Great Britain	William Fox-Pitt	Cosmopolitan II	49.00	#	127.80
2	Great Britain	Gary Parsonage	Magic Rogue	62.20	#	127.80
2	Great Britain	Karen Dixon	Too Smart	43.60	#	127.80
3	New Zealand	Blyth Tait	Chesterfield	48.80	#	135.60
3	New Zealand	Andrew Nicholson	Jaegermeister II	47.20	#	135.60
3	New Zealand	Victoria Latta	Broadcast News	41.00		135.60
3	New Zealand	Vaughn Jefferis	Bounce	47.40	#	135.60
4	Canada	Therese Washtock	Aristotle	40.00	#	139.20
4	Canada	Kelli McMullen Temple	Kilkenny	47.20	#	139.20
4	Canada	Claire Smith	Gordon Gibbons	53.00	#	139.20
4	Canada	Stuart Young-Black	Market Venture	52.00		139.20
5	Germany	Bodo Battenberg	Samthe Man	52.00	#	145.00
5	Germany	Juergen Blum	Brownie McGee	61.60	#	145.00
5	Germany	Ralf Ehrenbrink	Connection L	44.20		145.00
5	Germany	Bettina Overesch-Boeker	Watermill Stream	48.20	#	145.00
6	Australia	Wendy Schaeffer	Sunburst	49.40	#	156.40
6	Australia	Phillip Dutton	True Blue Girdwood	50.60	#	156.40
6	Australia	Gillian Rolton	Peppermint Grove	57.00		156.40
6	Australia	Andrew Hoy	Darien Powers	56.40	#	156.40
7	Japan	Kazuhiro Iwatani	Sejane De Vozerier	48.40	#	161.60
7	Japan	Masaru Fuse	Talisman De Jarry	53.40		161.60
7	Japan	Yoshihiko Kowata	Hell at Dawn	59.80	#	161.60
7	Japan	Takeaki Tsuchiya	Right on Time	61.60	#	161.60
8	France	Marie-Christine Duroy	Yarlands Summer Song	44.40		162.40
8	France	Roldolphe Scherer	Urane Des Pine	50.60	#	162.40
8	France	Koris Vieules	Tandresse de Canta	81.60	#	162.40
8	France	Jacques Dulcy	Upont	67.40	#	162.40
9	Italy	Ranieri Campello	Mill Bank	64.20	#	166.40
9	Italy	Giacamo della Chiesa	Diver Dan	61.80		166.40
9	Italy	Lara Villata	Nikki Dow	50.60	#	166.40
9	Italy	Nicola delli Santi	Donizetti	54.00	#	166.40
10	Sweden	Paula Tornqvist	Monaghan	58.80	#	166.80
10	Sweden	Linda Algotsson	Lafayette	51.80	#	166.80
10	Sweden	Therese Olavsson	Hectort	61.40	#	166.80
10	Sweden	Dag Albert	Nice 'N' Easy	56.20		166.80
11	Ireland	David Foster	Duneight Carnival	52.20	#	167.60
11	Ireland	Virginia McGrath	The Yellow Earl	61.20	#	167.60
11	Ireland	Alfie Buller	Sir Knight	74.60	#	167.60
11	Ireland	Eric Smiley	Enterprise	54.20		167.60
12	Spain	Luis Alvarez-Cervera	Pico's Nippur	77.60	#	172.60
12	Spain	Santiago Centenera	Just Dixon	47.80	#	172.60
12	Spain	Javier Revuelta	Toby	61.00	#	172.60
12	Spain	Enrique Sarasola Jr.	New Venture	63.80		172.60
13	Poland	Rafal Choynowski	Viva 5	67.20	#	182.80
13	Poland	Boguslaw Jarecki	Polisa	61.00	#	182.80
13	Poland	Artur Spolowicz	Hazard	63.60	#	182.80
13	Poland	Boguslaw Owczarek	Askar	58.80		182.80
14	Switzerland	Christoph Meier	Hunter V	56.80	#	190.60
14	Switzerland	Marius Marro	Gai Jeannot Ch	65.00	#	190.60
14	Switzerland	Heinz Wehrli	Ping Pong	68.80	#	190.60
15	Hungary	Gabor Schaller	Albattrosz	60.80	#	195.60
15	Hungary	Atilla Sos	Zsizsik	63.00	#	195.60
15	Hungary	Pal Tuska	Zatony	71.80	#	195.60
15	Hungary	Tibor Herczegfalvi	Lump	72.40		195.60
16	Brazil	Serguei Fofanoff	Kaiser Eden	73.40	#	208.60
16	Brazil	Sidney de Souza	Avalon da Mata	68.00	#	208.60
16	Brazil	Andre Giovanni	Al do Beto	67.20	#	208.60
16	Brazil	Luciano Miranda	Xilena	74.40		208.60

=== Cross Country ===
Each team consisted of four pairs of horse and rider. The penalty points of the lowest three pairs were added together to reach the team's penalty points.

Rank	NOC	Rider	Horse	Total Penalties	Scored	Team Penalties
1	Australia	Wendy Schaeffer	Sunburst	11.60	#	27.29
1	Australia	Phillip Dutton	True Blue Girdwood	8.80	#	27.29
1	Australia	Gillian Rolton	Peppermint Grove	WD		27.29
1	Australia	Andrew Hoy	Darien Powers	6.80	#	27.29
2	France	Marie-Christine Duroy	Yarlands Summer Song	RT		106.00
2	France	Roldolphe Scherer	Urane Des Pine	40.80	#	106.00
2	France	Koris Vieules	Tandresse de Canta	28.00	#	106.00
2	France	Jacques Dulcy	Upont	0.00	#	106.00
3	New Zealand	Blyth Tait	Chesterfield	20.80	#	120.20
3	New Zealand	Andrew Nicholson	Jaegermeister II	51.20	#	120.20
3	New Zealand	Victoria Latta	Broadcast News	RT		120.20
3	New Zealand	Vaughn Jefferis	Bounce	40.40	#	120.20
4	United States	Karen O'Connor	Biko	66.00	#	121.60
4	United States	David O'Connor	Giltedge	35.20	#	121.60
4	United States	Bruce Davidson	Heyday	20.40	#	121.60
4	United States	Jill Henneberg	Nirvana	RT		121.60
5	Japan	Kazuhiro Iwatani	Sejane De Vozerier	47.60	#	147.80
5	Japan	Masaru Fuse	Talisman De Jarry	94.40		147.80
5	Japan	Yoshihiko Kowata	Hell at Dawn	57.20	#	147.80
5	Japan	Takeaki Tsuchiya	Right on Time	34.80	#	147.80
6	Sweden	Paula Tornqvist	Monaghan	55.20	#	163.20
6	Sweden	Linda Algotsson	Lafayette	16.40	#	163.20
6	Sweden	Therese Olavsson	Hectort	106.40	#	163.20
6	Sweden	Dag Albert	Nice 'N' Easy	RT		163.20
7	Great Britain	Ian Stark	Stanwick Ghost	121.20		170.60
7	Great Britain	William Fox-Pitt	Cosmopolitan II	62.80	#	170.60
7	Great Britain	Gary Parsonage	Magic Rogue	37.20	#	170.60
7	Great Britain	Karen Dixon	Too Smart	43.20	#	170.60
8	Spain	Luis Alvarez-Cervera	Pico's Nippur	184.80	#	395.80
8	Spain	Santiago Centenera	Just Dixon	73.20	#	395.80
8	Spain	Javier Revuelta	Toby	124.00	#	395.80
8	Spain	Enrique Sarasola Jr.	New Venture	EL		395.80
9	Germany	Bodo Battenberg	Samthe Man	32.40	#	1047.40
9	Germany	Juergen Blum	Brownie McGee	RT	#	1047.40
9	Germany	Ralf Ehrenbrink	Connection L	EL		1047.40
9	Germany	Bettina Overesch-Boeker	Watermill Stream	59.20	#	1047.40
10	Switzerland	Christoph Meier	Hunter V	122.00	#	1121.40
10	Switzerland	Marius Marro	Gai Jeannot Ch	EL	#	1121.40
10	Switzerland	Heinz Wehrli	Ping Pong	64.40	#	1121.40
11	Ireland	David Foster	Duneight Carnival	36.00	#	1162.80
11	Ireland	Virginia McGrath	The Yellow Earl	181.00	#	1162.80
11	Ireland	Alfie Buller	Sir Knight	WD	#	1162.80
11	Ireland	Eric Smiley	Enterprise	WD		1162.80
12	Italy	Ranieri Campello	Mill Bank	RT	#	1193.80
12	Italy	Giacamo della Chiesa	Diver Dan	WD		1193.80
12	Italy	Lara Villata	Nikki Dow	124.80	#	1193.80
12	Italy	Nicola delli Santi	Donizetti	130.80	#	1193.80
13	Hungary	Gabor Schaller	Albattrosz	RT	#	1220.00
13	Hungary	Atilla Sos	Zsizsik	158.80	#	1220.00
13	Hungary	Pal Tuska	Zatony	122.00	#	1220.00
13	Hungary	Tibor Herczegfalvi	Lump	RT		1220.00
14	Canada	Therese Washtock	Aristotle	EL	#	1935.20
14	Canada	Kelli McMullen Temple	Kilkenny	27.20	#	1935.20
14	Canada	Claire Smith	Gordon Gibbons	RT	#	1935.20
14	Canada	Stuart Young-Black	Market Venture	WD		1935.20
15	Brazil	Serguei Fofanoff	Kaiser Eden	94.80	#	1959.60
15	Brazil	Sidney de Souza	Avalon da Mata	WD	#	1959.60
15	Brazil	Andre Giovanni	Al do Beto	EL	#	1959.60
15	Brazil	Luciano Miranda	Xilena	RT		1959.60
16	Poland	Rafal Choynowski	Viva 5	EL	#	2005.40
16	Poland	Boguslaw Jarecki	Polisa	127.20	#	2005.40
16	Poland	Artur Spolowicz	Hazard	EL	#	2005.40
16	Poland	Boguslaw Owczarek	Askar	EL		2005.40

=== Dressage & Cross Country ===
Each team consisted of four pairs of horse and rider. The penalty points of the lowest three pairs were added together to reach the team's penalty points.

Rank	NOC	Rider	Horse	Dressage	Cross Country	Scored	Team Penalties
1	Australia	Wendy Schaeffer	Sunburst	49.40	11.60	#	183.60
1	Australia	Phillip Dutton	True Blue Girdwood	50.60	8.80	#	183.60
1	Australia	Gillian Rolton	Peppermint Grove	57.00	WD		183.60
1	Australia	Andrew Hoy	Darien Powers	56.40	6.80	#	183.60
2	United States	Karen O'Connor	Biko	39.60	66.00	#	244.60
2	United States	David O'Connor	Giltedge	40.80	35.20	#	244.60
2	United States	Bruce Davidson	Heyday	46.20	20.40	#	244.60
2	United States	Jill Henneberg	Nirvana	57.00	RT		244.60
3	New Zealand	Blyth Tait	Chesterfield	48.80	20.80	#	255.80
3	New Zealand	Andrew Nicholson	Jaegermeister II	47.20	51.20	#	255.80
3	New Zealand	Victoria Latta	Broadcast News	41.00	RT		255.80
3	New Zealand	Vaughn Jefferis	Bounce	47.40	40.40	#	255.80
4	France	Marie-Christine Duroy	Yarlands Summer Song	44.40	RT		268.40
4	France	Roldolphe Scherer	Urane Des Pine	50.60	40.80	#	268.40
4	France	Koris Vieules	Tandresse de Canta	81.60	28.00	#	268.40
4	France	Jacques Dulcy	Upont	67.40	0.00	#	268.40
5	Great Britain	Ian Stark	Stanwick Ghost	35.20	121.20		298.40
5	Great Britain	William Fox-Pitt	Cosmopolitan II	49.00	62.80	#	298.40
5	Great Britain	Gary Parsonage	Magic Rogue	62.60	37.20	#	298.40
5	Great Britain	Karen Dixon	Too Smart	43.60	43.20	#	298.40
6	Japan	Kazuhiro Iwatani	Sejane De Vozerier	48.40	47.60	#	309.40
6	Japan	Masaru Fuse	Talisman De Jarry	53.40	94.40		309.40
6	Japan	Yoshihiko Kowata	Hell at Dawn	59.80	57.20	#	309.40
6	Japan	Takeaki Tsuchiya	Right on Time	61.60	34.80	#	309.40
7	Sweden	Paula Tornqvist	Monaghan	58.80	55.20	#	330.00
7	Sweden	Linda Algotsson	Lafayette	51.80	16.40	#	330.00
7	Sweden	Therese Olavsson	Hectort	61.40	106.40	#	330.00
7	Sweden	Dag Albert	Nice 'N' Easy	56.20	RT		330.00
8	Spain	Luis Alvarez-Cervera	Pico's Nippur	77.60	184.80	#	568.40
8	Spain	Santiago Centenera	Just Dixon	47.80	73.20	#	568.40
8	Spain	Javier Revuelta	Toby	61.00	124.00	#	568.40
8	Spain	Enrique Sarasola Jr.	New Venture	63.80	EL		568.40
9	Germany	Bodo Battenberg	Samthe Man	52.00	32.40	#	1192.40
9	Germany	Juergen Blum	Brownie McGee	61.60	RT	#	1192.40
9	Germany	Ralf Ehrenbrink	Connection L	44.20	EL		1192.40
9	Germany	Bettina Overesch-Boeker	Watermill Stream	48.80	59.20	#	1192.40
10	Switzerland	Christoph Meier	Hunter V	56.80	122.00	#	1312.00
10	Switzerland	Marius Marro	Gai Jeannot Ch	65.00	EL	#	1312.00
10	Switzerland	Heinz Wehrli	Ping Pong	68.80	64.40	#	1312.00
11	Ireland	David Foster	Duneight Carnival	52.20	36.00	#	1330.40
11	Ireland	Virginia McGrath	The Yellow Earl	61.20	181.00	#	1330.40
11	Ireland	Alfie Buller	Sir Knight	74.60	WD	#	1330.40
11	Ireland	Eric Smiley	Enterprise	54.20	WD		1330.40
12	Italy	Ranieri Campello	Mill Bank	64.20	RT	#	1360.20
12	Italy	Giacamo della Chiesa	Diver Dan	61.80	WD		1360.20
12	Italy	Lara Villata	Nikki Dow	50.60	124.80	#	1360.20
12	Italy	Nicola delli Santi	Donizetti	54.00	130.80	#	1360.20
13	Hungary	Gabor Schaller	Albattrosz	60.80	RT	#	1415.60
13	Hungary	Atilla Sos	Zsizsik	63.00	158.80	#	1415.60
13	Hungary	Pal Tuska	Zatony	71.80	122.00	#	1415.60
13	Hungary	Tibor Herczegfalvi	Lump	72.40	RT		1415.60
14	Canada	Therese Washtock	Aristotle	40.00	EL	#	2074.40
14	Canada	Kelli McMullen Temple	Kilkenny	47.20	27.20	#	2074.40
14	Canada	Claire Smith	Gordon Gibbons	53.00	RT	#	2074.40
14	Canada	Stuart Young-Black	Market Venture	52.00	WD		2074.40
15	Brazil	Serguei Fofanoff	Kaiser Eden	73.40	94.80	#	2168.20
15	Brazil	Sidney de Souza	Avalon da Mata	68.00	WD	#	2168.20
15	Brazil	Andre Giovanni	Al do Beto	67.20	EL	#	2168.20
15	Brazil	Luciano Miranda	Xilena	74.40	RT		2168.20
16	Poland	Rafal Choynowski	Viva 5	67.20	EL	#	2188.20
16	Poland	Boguslaw Jarecki	Polisa	61.00	127.20	#	2188.20
16	Poland	Artur Spolowicz	Hazard	63.00	EL	#	2188.20
16	Poland	Boguslaw Owczarek	Askar	58.80	EL		2188.20

=== Jumping ===
Each team consisted of four pairs of horse and rider. The penalty points of the lowest three pairs were added together to reach the team's penalty points.

Rank	NOC	Rider	Horse	Total Penalties	Scored	Team Penalties
1	New Zealand	Blyth Tait	Chesterfield	0.50	#	12.75
1	New Zealand	Andrew Nicholson	Jaegermeister II	2.25	#	12.75
1	New Zealand	Victoria Latta	Broadcast News			12.75
1	New Zealand	Vaughn Jefferis	Bounce	10.00	#	12.75
2	Great Britain	Ian Stark	Stanwick Ghost	15.25		14.50
2	Great Britain	William Fox-Pitt	Cosmopolitan II	5.75	#	14.50
2	Great Britain	Gary Parsonage	Magic Rogue	7.00	#	14.50
2	Great Britain	Karen Dixon	Too Smart	1.75	#	14.50
3	Sweden	Paula Tornqvist	Monaghan	5.00	#	15.25
3	Sweden	Linda Algotsson	Lafayette	10.25	#	15.25
3	Sweden	Therese Olavsson	Hectort	0.00	#	15.25
3	Sweden	Dag Albert	Nice 'N' Easy			15.25
4	United States	Karen O'Connor	Biko	0.00	#	16.50
4	United States	David O'Connor	Giltedge	0.00	#	16.50
4	United States	Bruce Davidson	Heyday	16.50	#	16.50
4	United States	Jill Henneberg	Nirvana			16.50
5	Japan	Kazuhiro Iwatani	Sejane De Vozerier	5.00	#	16.75
5	Japan	Masaru Fuse	Talisman De Jarry	6.25		16.75
5	Japan	Yoshihiko Kowata	Hell at Dawn	5.50	#	16.75
5	Japan	Takeaki Tsuchiya	Right on Time	6.25	#	16.75
6	Australia	Wendy Schaeffer	Sunburst	0.00	#	20.25
6	Australia	Phillip Dutton	True Blue Girdwood	10.00	#	20.25
6	Australia	Gillian Rolton	Peppermint Grove			20.25
6	Australia	Andrew Hoy	Darien Powers	10.25	#	20.25
7	France	Marie-Christine Duroy	Yarlands Summer Song			39.25
7	France	Roldolphe Scherer	Urane Des Pine	17.75	#	39.25
7	France	Koris Vieules	Tandresse de Canta	10.00	#	39.25
7	France	Jacques Dulcy	Upont	11.50	#	39.25
8	Spain	Luis Alvarez-Cervera	Pico's Nippur	11.00	#	53.25
8	Spain	Santiago Centenera	Just Dixon	40.00	#	53.25
8	Spain	Javier Revuelta	Toby	2.25	#	53.25
8	Spain	Enrique Sarasola Jr.	New Venture			53.25
-	Germany	Bodo Battenberg	Samthe Man	5.00	#	
-	Germany	Juergen Blum	Brownie McGee		#	
-	Germany	Ralf Ehrenbrink	Connection L			
-	Germany	Bettina Overesch-Boeker	Watermill Stream	6.75	#	
-	Switzerland	Christoph Meier	Hunter V	0.00	#	
-	Switzerland	Marius Marro	Gai Jeannot Ch		#	
-	Switzerland	Heinz Wehrli	Ping Pong	5.50	#	
-	Ireland	David Foster	Duneight Carnival	5.00	#	
-	Ireland	Virginia McGrath	The Yellow Earl	49.00	#	
-	Ireland	Alfie Buller	Sir Knight		#	
-	Ireland	Eric Smiley	Enterprise			
-	Italy	Ranieri Campello	Mill Bank		#	
-	Italy	Giacamo della Chiesa	Diver Dan			
-	Italy	Lara Villata	Nikki Dow	18.75	#	
-	Italy	Nicola delli Santi	Donizetti	15.50	#	
-	Hungary	Gabor Schaller	Albattrosz		#	
-	Hungary	Atilla Sos	Zsizsik	11.50	#	
-	Hungary	Pal Tuska	Zatony	7.00	#	
-	Hungary	Tibor Herczegfalvi	Lump			
-	Canada	Therese Washtock	Aristotle		#	
-	Canada	Kelli McMullen Temple	Kilkenny	0.00	#	
-	Canada	Claire Smith	Gordon Gibbons		#	
-	Canada	Stuart Young-Black	Market Venture			
-	Brazil	Serguei Fofanoff	Kaiser Eden	6.25	#	
-	Brazil	Sidney de Souza	Avalon da Mata		#	
-	Brazil	Andre Giovanni	Al do Beto		#	
-	Brazil	Luciano Miranda	Xilena			
-	Poland	Rafal Choynowski	Viva 5		#	
-	Poland	Boguslaw Jarecki	Polisa	9.75	#	
-	Poland	Artur Spolowicz	Hazard		#	
-	Poland	Boguslaw Owczarek	Askar			

=== Dressage, Cross Country, & Jumping (Final Result) ===
Each team consisted of four pairs of horse and rider. The penalty points of the lowest three pairs were added together to reach the team's penalty points.

Rank	NOC	Rider	Horse	Dressage	Cross Country	Jumping	Total	Scored	Team Penalties
1	Australia	Wendy Schaeffer	Sunburst	49.40	11.60	0.00	61.00	#	203.85
1	Australia	Phillip Dutton	True Blue Girdwood	50.60	8.80	10.00	69.40	#	203.85
1	Australia	Gillian Rolton	Peppermint Grove	57.00	WD				203.85
1	Australia	Andrew Hoy	Darien Powers	56.40	6.80	10.25	73.45	#	203.85
2	United States	Karen O'Connor	Biko	39.60	66.00	0.00	105.60	#	261.10
2	United States	David O'Connor	Giltedge	40.80	35.20	0.00	76.00	#	261.10
2	United States	Bruce Davidson	Heyday	46.20	20.40	16.50	79.50	#	261.10
2	United States	Jill Henneberg	Nirvana	57.00	RT				261.10
3	New Zealand	Blyth Tait	Chesterfield	48.80	20.80	0.50	70.10	#	268.55
3	New Zealand	Andrew Nicholson	Jaegermeister II	47.20	51.20	2.25	100.65	#	268.55
3	New Zealand	Victoria Latta	Broadcast News	41.00	RT				268.55
3	New Zealand	Vaughn Jefferis	Bounce	47.40	40.40	10.00	97.80	#	268.55
4	France	Marie-Christine Duroy	Yarlands Summer Song	44.40	RT				307.65
4	France	Roldolphe Scherer	Urane Des Pine	50.60	40.80	17.75	109.15	#	307.65
4	France	Koris Vieules	Tandresse de Canta	81.60	28.00	10.00	119.60	#	307.65
4	France	Jacques Dulcy	Upont	67.40	0.00	11.50	78.90	#	307.65
5	Great Britain	Ian Stark	Stanwick Ghost	35.20	121.20	15.25	171.65		312.90
5	Great Britain	William Fox-Pitt	Cosmopolitan II	49.00	62.80	5.75	117.55	#	312.90
5	Great Britain	Gary Parsonage	Magic Rogue	62.60	37.20	7.00	106.80	#	312.90
5	Great Britain	Karen Dixon	Too Smart	43.60	43.20	1.75	88.55	#	312.90
6	Japan	Kazuhiro Iwatani	Sejane De Vozerier	48.40	47.60	5.00	101.00	#	326.15
6	Japan	Masaru Fuse	Talisman De Jarry	53.40	94.40	6.25	154.05		326.15
6	Japan	Yoshihiko Kowata	Hell at Dawn	59.80	57.20	5.50	122.50	#	326.15
6	Japan	Takeaki Tsuchiya	Right on Time	61.60	34.80	6.25	102.65	#	326.15
7	Sweden	Paula Törnqvist	Monaghan	58.80	55.20	5.00	99.00	#	345.25
7	Sweden	Linda Algotsson	Lafayette	51.80	16.40	10.25	78.45	#	345.25
7	Sweden	Therese Olausson	Hectort	61.40	106.40	0.00	167.80	#	345.25
7	Sweden	Dag Albert	Nice 'N' Easy	56.20	RT		RT		345.25
8	Spain	Luis Alvarez-Cervera	Pico's Nippur	77.60	184.80	11.00	273.40	#	621.65
8	Spain	Santiago Centenera	Just Dixon	47.80	73.20	11.00	273.40	#	621.65
8	Spain	Javier Revuelta	Toby	61.00	124.00	2.25	187.25	#	621.65
8	Spain	Enrique Sarasola Jr.	New Venture	63.80	EL		EL		621.65
9	Germany	Bodo Battenberg	Samthe Man	52.00	32.40	5.00	89.40	#	1204.50
9	Germany	Jürgen Blum	Brownie McGee	61.60	RT		RT	#	1204.50
9	Germany	Ralf Ehrenbrink	Connection L	44.20	EL		EL		1204.50
9	Germany	Bettina Overesch-Böker-Hoy	Watermill Stream	48.80	59.20	6.75	114.75	#	1204.50
10	Switzerland	Christoph Meier	Hunter V	56.80	122.00	0.00	178.80	#	1317.50
10	Switzerland	Marius Marro	Gai Jeannot Ch	65.00	EL		EL	#	1317.50
10	Switzerland	Heinz Wehrli	Ping Pong	68.80	64.40	5.50	138.70	#	1317.50
11	Ireland	David Foster	Duneight Carnival	52.20	36.00	5.00	93.20	#	1384.40
11	Ireland	Virginia McGrath	The Yellow Earl	61.20	181.00	49.00	291.20	#	1384.40
11	Ireland	Alfie Buller	Sir Knight	74.60	WD		WD	#	1384.40
11	Ireland	Eric Smiley	Enterprise	54.20	WD		WD		1384.40
12	Italy	Ranieri Campello	Mill Bank	64.20	RT		RT	#	1394.45
12	Italy	Giacomo Della Chiesa	Diver Dan	61.80	WD		WD		1394.45
12	Italy	Lara Villata	Nikki Dow	50.60	124.80	18.75	194.15	#	1394.45
12	Italy	Nicola Delli Santi	Donizetti	54.00	130.80	15.50	200.30	#	1394.45
13	Hungary	Gábor Schaller	Albattrosz	60.80	RT		RT	#	1434.10
13	Hungary	Atilla Sos	Zsizsik	63.00	158.80	11.50	233.30	#	1434.10
13	Hungary	Pál Tuska	Zatony	71.80	122.00	7.00	200.80	#	1434.10
13	Hungary	Tibor Herczegfalvi	Lump	72.40	RT		RT		1434.10
14	Canada	Therese Washtock	Aristotle	40.00	EL		EL	#	2074.40
14	Canada	Kelli McMullen Temple	Kilkenny	47.20	27.20	0.00	74.40	#	2074.40
14	Canada	Claire Smith	Gordon Gibbons	53.00	RT		RT	#	2074.40
14	Canada	Stuart Young-Black	Market Venture	52.00	WD		WD1		2074.40
15	Brazil	Serguei Fofanoff	Kaiser Eden	73.40	94.80	6.25	174.45	#	2174.45
15	Brazil	Sidney de Souza	Avalon da Mata	68.00	WD		WD	#	2174.45
15	Brazil	André Giovanini	Al do Beto	67.20	EL		EL	#	2174.45
15	Brazil	Luciano Miranda	Xilena	74.40	RT		RT		2174.45
16	Poland	Rafał Choynowski	Viva 5	67.20	EL		EL	#	2197.95
16	Poland	Bogusław Jarecki	Polisa	61.00	127.20	9.75	197.75	#	2197.95
16	Poland	Artur Społowicz	Hazard	63.00	EL		EL	#	2197.95
16	Poland	Bogusław Owczarek	Askar	58.80	EL		EL		2197.95

== Sources ==
- Official Report of the 1996 Summer Olympics available at https://web.archive.org/web/20060622162855/http://www.la84foundation.org/5va/reports_frmst.htm
