= Jill Henneberg =

American equestrian (born 1974)

Personal information
- Born: September 22, 1974 (age 51)
Medal record
Equestrian
Representing the United States
Olympic Games
Silver medal – second place	1996 Atlanta	Team eventing

Jill Henneberg (born September 22, 1974) is an American equestrian. She won a silver medal in team eventing at the 1996 Summer Olympics in Atlanta, together with Karen O'Connor, David O'Connor and Bruce Davidson.
