= Ólafsson =

Ólafsson is an Icelandic patronymic that means son of Ólafur. In Icelandic names, the name is not strictly a surname because it is not a family name, but a patronymic. People with the surname include:

- Bragi Ólafsson (born 1962), Icelandic musician and writer
- Eggert Ólafsson (1726–1768), Iceland explorer and writer; conservator of the Icelandic language
- Friðrik Ólafsson (1935–2025), Icelandic chess grandmaster
- Gunnsteinn Ólafsson (born 1962), Icelandic orchestra and opera conductor
- Hössi Ólafsson (born 1977), Icelandic rapper and actor
- Jón Ólafsson (1850–1916), Icelandic journalist and poet
- Loa Olafsson, Danish athlete
- Kjartan Ólafsson (disambiguation), various people
- Logi Ólafsson (born 1954), Icelandic professional football coach
- Magnús Óláfsson (disambiguation), various people
- Ólafur Jóhann Ólafsson (born 1962), Icelandic writer and businessman; executive vice president of Time Warner
- Víkingur Ólafsson (born 1984), Icelandic pianist.
