= Karen O'Connor =

American equestrian

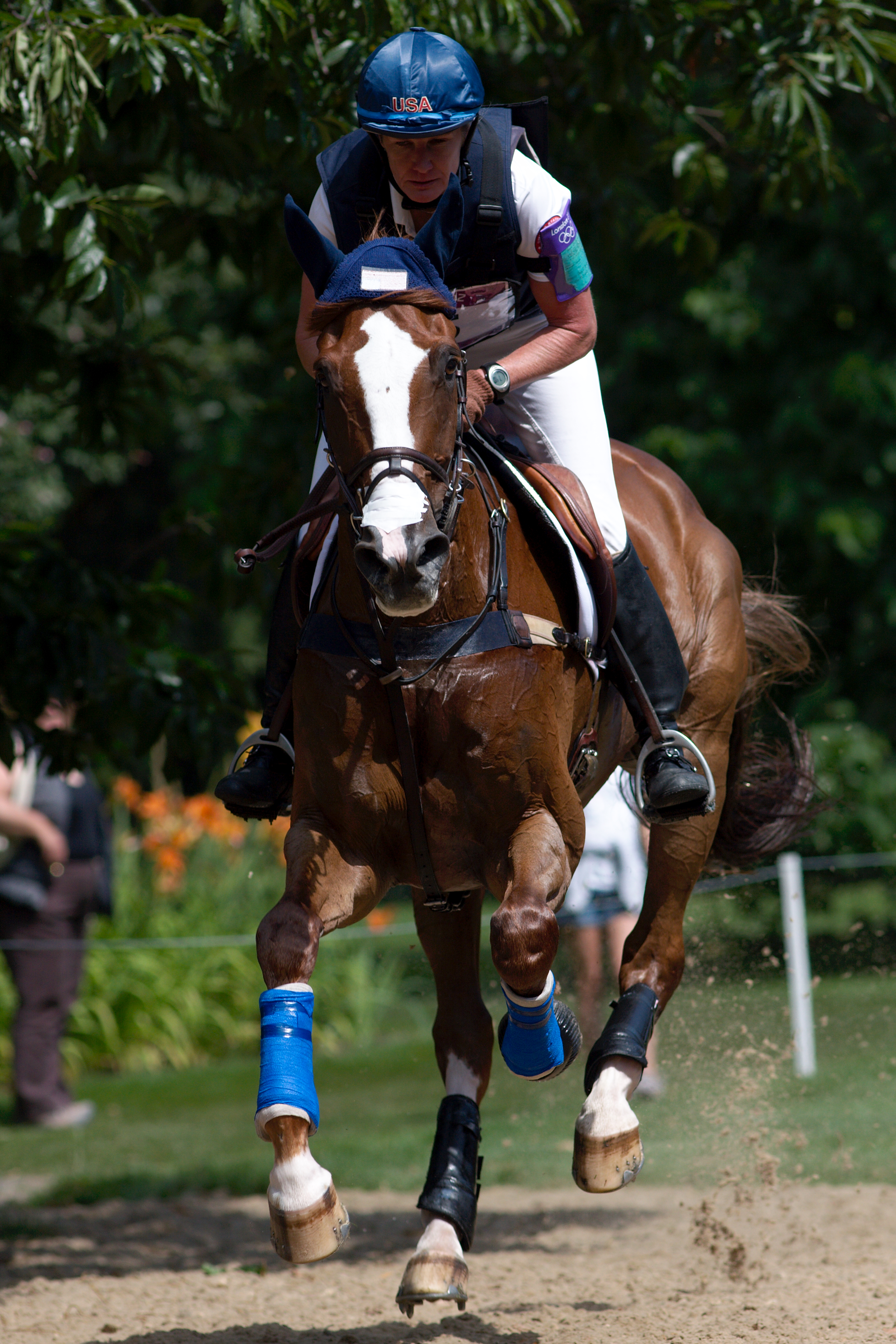
- O'Connor and Mr Medicott competing at the 2012 Summer Olympics in London

Personal information
- Born: February 17, 1958 (age 68) Bolton, Massachusetts, U.S.
Medal record
Equestrian
Representing the United States
Olympic Games
Silver medal – second place	1996 Atlanta	Team eventing
Bronze medal – third place	2000 Sydney	Team eventing
Pan American Games
Gold medal – first place	2007 Rio de Janeiro	Team eventing
Gold medal – first place	2007 Rio de Janeiro	Individual eventing
Silver medal – second place	2003 Fair Hill	Individual eventing
World Championships
Bronze medal – third place	1998 Rome	Team eventing

Karen Lende O'Connor (born February 17, 1958) is an American equestrian who competes in three-day eventing. Although she did not come from a family of equestrians, her interest in horses started at an early age, and she received her first horse for her 11th birthday. O'Connor began competing internationally in the late 1970s, and in 1986 began riding for the US national eventing team. Since then, she had ridden in five Olympic Games, three World Equestrian Games and two Pan-American Games, winning multiple medals, including a team silver at the 1996 Olympic Games and a team bronze at the 2000 Olympic Games. She has also posted numerous wins and top-10 finishes at other international events. As of 2013, O'Connor is not competing, having suffered fractures to two thoracic vertebrae during a fall at a competition in October 2012.

In 1993, O'Connor married fellow equestrian David O'Connor, also a three-day event rider for the US team. When not competing, she plays active roles in the administration side of the United States Equestrian Federation and the United States Eventing Association (USEA). O'Connor and her horses have been honored by multiple organizations for their competition record, and as of 2013, six horses ridden by O'Connor held positions in the list of the top 50 USEA high scoring horses.

== Early life and marriage ==
O'Connor was born in Bolton, Massachusetts, to parents Phillip and Joanne Lende. She was the second child of three, and the only girl; her two brothers are Steven and Chip. She did not come from a family of equestrians, but became interested in the sport after seeing a documentary on Great Britain's Princess Anne's involvement in the sport. For O'Connor's 11th birthday, she received a horse named Midnight. She was a member of the United States Pony Clubs, in the Groton Pony Club in the Central New England Region. She has been inducted into the United States Pony Club Hall of Fame. She later owned a Connemara pony named Erin's Shamrock, who in 1978 was awarded the Camlin Trophy by the American Connemara Pony Society "in recognition of a career of outstanding competitive performance".

O'Connor married fellow equestrian David O'Connor, also an international three day event rider, on June 26, 1993. The pair became the first married couple to compete on the same US Olympic equestrian team when they rode with their team to a silver medal at the 1996 Summer Olympics. They rode to a second shared medal at the 2000 Summer Olympics, again marking a historical Olympic moment as the first husband and wife duo to do so. They operate equestrian training facilities in The Plains, Virginia and Ocala, Florida.

== Career ==
O'Connor began competing internationally in the late 1970s, and in 1986 started riding with the US national eventing team, beginning with the Australian Gawler World Championships, mounted on Lutin V. She won multiple CCI3* events, including the Rolex Kentucky Three Day and the Fair Hill International, and the CCI4* at the 1999 Rolex event, riding Prince Panache. During the 1990s, O'Connor and her horse Biko were mainstays of the US eventing team, riding to multiple top-ten finishes at major international events, including the Badminton Horse Trials and the Rolex Kentucky Three Day. O'Connor rode at the 1994 World Equestrian Games and the 1998 World Equestrian Games, helping the US team to a bronze medal at the latter. At the 2006 World Equestrian Games she rode Upstage as an individual, but did not compete in the team portion of the event.

O'Connor has competed in five Olympic Games, representing the US team at all five and also riding as an individual at three. At the 1988 Summer Olympics, riding The Optimist, she posted a DNF (did not finish) in both the team and individual portions. At the 1996 Summer Olympics, riding Biko, she and the US team rode to a silver medal. At the 2000 Summer Olympics, riding Prince Panache, O'Connor and the US team again took a medal, this time bronze. O'Connor did not ride as an individual at either the 1996 or the 2000 events. In the 2008 Summer Games, riding Mandiba, she placed 44th individually, while the US team took 7th. O'Connor was not originally scheduled to ride in the 2008 Games, but was moved to a competition spot in July 2008 when teammate Heidi White was forced to withdraw. Four years later, at the 2012 Summer Games, the US team repeated their placing, while O'Connor improved to 9th, riding Mr. Medicott. Her 9th-place finish was the highest rank achieved by a US equestrian at the 2012 Games. O'Connor was the oldest Olympian to represent the US in any sport at the 2012 Games.

At the 2003 Pan American Games, O'Connor took an individual silver medal, riding Joker's Wild. During the 2000s, O'Connor and her 14.1 hands (57 inches, 145 cm) sport pony Theodore O'Connor, nicknamed Teddy, gathered a large following as he competed and won against much larger horses. The pair finished third at the 2007 Rolex Kentucky Three Day and sixth at the same event in 2008. At the 2007 Pan American Games, O'Connor, riding Teddy, won individual gold and assisted the US squad to a team gold. In 2008, short-listed for the US eventing team at the 2008 Olympic Games, Teddy suffered a catastrophic injury and was euthanized. The United States Equestrian Federation (USEF) issued a press release that stated "Seeing was believing with ‘Teddy’ as it seemed impossible to imagine that a pony of his size could do his job with such tremendous ease." In September 2009, O'Connor suffered a broken shoulderblade in a motorcycle accident. She was out of competition for five weeks, during which time her main mount, Mandiba, was ridden by fellow US eventer Phillip Dutton. Between 2010 and 2012, O'Connor continued her successful career, riding to multiple top-ten finishes, and several wins, at CCI2–4* events, aboard a number of horses. On October 6, 2012, O'Connor fell while competing at the Morven Park Fall Horse Trials in Leesburg, Virginia. She suffered a burst fracture of her T4 vertebra and a compression fracture of her T5 vertebra. After one of the vertebra shifted, she underwent surgery on October 18. In June 2013, it was announced that during the remainder of her recovery, Phillip Dutton would again take over as the rider of her top horse, this time 2012 Olympic mount Mr. Medicott.

When not competing, O'Connor serves as a member of the USEF's Board of Directors and as an active member of the United States Eventing Association's (USEA) Instructor Certification Program.

=== Honors ===
In 1995, O'Connor's horse Biko was named The Chronicle of the Horse's Eventing Horse of the Year, and in 1996, O'Connor was named the journal's Eventing Horseman of the Year, in combination with her husband, David. In 1999, Biko was honored as the USEA's Horse of the Century, and in 2006, was inducted into the organization's Hall of Fame. In 2007, O'Connor's pony Theodore O'Connor was named The Chronicle of the Horse's Overall Horse of the Year and Eventing Horse of the Year, as they called him the "horse world's most adored underdog". As of 2013, six horses ridden by O'Connor (Upstage, Biko, Prince Panache, Mandiba, Regal Scot and Grand Slam III) held positions in the list of the top 50 USEA high scoring horses.

== Notable horses ==
- Biko - 1984 Bay Thoroughbred Gelding (Beau Charmeur x Prince Hansel)
  - 1994 World Equestrian Games - Individual 11th Place
  - 1996 Atlanta Olympics - Team Silver Medal
- Prince Panache - 1984 Bay Thoroughbred Gelding
  - 1998 World Equestrian Games - Team Fourth Place
  - 2000 Sydney Olympics - Team Bronze Medal
- Joker's Wild - 1989 Bay Gelding
  - 2003 Pan American Games - Individual Silver Medal
- Upstage - 1991 Bay Gelding (Touching Wood)
  - 2006 World Equestrian Games - Individual 42nd Place
- Theodore O'Connor - 1995 Chestnut Sport Pony Gelding (Theodore x Honestturn)
  - 2007 Pan American Games - Team Gold Medal, Individual Gold Medal
- Mandiba - 1999 Dark Bay Irish Sport Horse Gelding (Master Imp x Chair Lift)
  - 2008 Beijing Olympics - Team Seventh Place, Individual 44th Place
  - 2010 World Equestrian Games - Team Fourth Place, Individual 19th Place
- Mr. Medicott - 1999 Chestnut Irish Sport Horse Gelding (Cruising x Edmund Burke)
  - 2012 London Olympics - Team Seventh Place, Individual Ninth Place
