= Olavsson =

Olavsson or Olavssøn is a given name and a surname. Notable people with the name include:

- Jens Olavssøn Bratt (1505–1548), Norwegian clergyman
- Eivind Olavsson Groven (1901–1977), Norwegian composer and music-theorist
- Gunnar Olavsson Helland (1852–1938), Norwegian Hardanger fiddle maker
- Talleiv Olavsson Huvestad (1761–1847), Norwegian teacher, farmer and politician
- Konráð Olavsson (born 1968), Icelandic Olympic handball player
- Therese Olavsson (born 1968), Swedish equestrian
- Tryggve Olavsson (928 – c. 963), king of Viken, Norway (Vingulmark and Rånrike)
- Aasmund Olavsson Vinje (1818–1870), Norwegian poet and journalist

== See also ==
- Olofsson
- Olufsen
- Ólafsson
