= Babamist =

Racing horse

- Breed: Thoroughbred
- Sire: Mystic
- Grandsire: Relic
- Dam: Babadana
- Maternal grandsire: Flushing
- Sex: Stallion
- Foaled: 1969
- Country: USA
- Colour: Chestnut, blaze, half-stockings on hind legs
- Breeder: W. Burling Cocks
- Owner: Mrs. M. Valentine

Babamist was a stallion that had a profound impact on the American breeding industry, especially in the sport of eventing.

Babamist was foaled in Maryland, and ran in steeplechases for four years before his breeding career. His record was not particularly exceptional: out of 13 starts he had a record of 5-0-1 and earnings of $10,620. He later was used as a fox hunter, show jumper, and eventer.

== Offspring ==
Babamist is a producer of event horses. He is one of only a few American stallions to consistently produce offspring who compete at the top level of eventing.

Offspring include:

- Heyday - Pam Am Gold Medalist, Olympic Silver Medalist
- Little Tricky
- Snowy River - Member of US Equestrian Team at 1997 European Championships
- Mystic High - 1988 USCTA mare of the year
- Good Force
- Arctic Mist
- My Turn
- Camacasie
- Solimist
- Dynamite II

== Pedigree ==
Pedigree of Babamist
Sire Mystic 1954	Relic; 1945	War Relic; 1938	Man o' War - 1917
Sire Mystic 1954	Relic; 1945	War Relic; 1938	Friars Carse - 1923
Sire Mystic 1954	Relic; 1945	Bridal Colors; 1931	Black Toney - 1911
Sire Mystic 1954	Relic; 1945	Bridal Colors; 1931	Vaila - 1911
Sire Mystic 1954	Tosca; 1942	Tourbillon; 1928	Ksar - 1918
Sire Mystic 1954	Tosca; 1942	Tourbillon; 1928	Durban - 1918
Sire Mystic 1954	Tosca; 1942	Eroica; 1930	Banstar - 1923
Sire Mystic 1954	Tosca; 1942	Eroica; 1930	Macedonienne - 1913
Dam Babadana 1949	Flushing; 1939	Mahmoud; 1933	Blenheim - 1927
Dam Babadana 1949	Flushing; 1939	Mahmoud; 1933	Mah Mahal - 1928
Dam Babadana 1949	Flushing; 1939	Callandar; 1931	Buchan - 1916
Dam Babadana 1949	Flushing; 1939	Callandar; 1931	Calendula - 1926
Dam Babadana 1949	Beaubabs; 1940	Gino; 1930	Tetratema - 1917
Dam Babadana 1949	Beaubabs; 1940	Gino; 1930	Teresina - 1917
Dam Babadana 1949	Beaubabs; 1940	Beauflower; 1933	Sun Beau - 1925
Dam Babadana 1949	Beaubabs; 1940	Beauflower; 1933	Flower Girl - 1925
