= David O'Connor (equestrian) =

American equestrian

Personal information
- Born: January 18, 1962 (age 64) Washington, D.C., U.S.
Medal record
Equestrian
Representing the United States
Olympic Games
Gold medal – first place	2000 Sydney	Individual eventing
Silver medal – second place	1996 Atlanta	Team eventing
Bronze medal – third place	2000 Sydney	Team eventing
World Championships
Gold medal – first place	2002 Jerez	Team eventing
Bronze medal – third place	1998 Rome	Team eventing
Pan American Games
Gold medal – first place	1999 Winnipeg	Team eventing
Silver medal – second place	1999 Winnipeg	Individual eventing

David John O'Connor (born January 18, 1962) is a retired equestrian who represented the United States in the sport of three-day eventing. He competed in two Olympic Games, winning a team silver at the 1996 Summer Olympics and an individual gold and team bronze at the 2000 Summer Olympics. At the 1999 Pan American Games, O'Connor took an individual silver and team gold and at the 2002 World Equestrian Games he assisted the US team to gold. After his retirement from competition in 2004, he became involved in the administrative side of international eventing. O'Connor has held top coaching roles for the US and Canadian national eventing teams, and was president of the United States Equestrian Federation from 2004 to 2012. During his career, O'Connor and his horses were awarded many honors, including equestrian and horse of the year awards from several organizations. In 2009, he was inducted to the United States Eventing Association's Hall of Fame, and two of his horses have been granted the same honor. O'Connor is married to fellow international event rider Karen O'Connor, and the pair operate two equestrian training facilities in the eastern United States.

== Personal life ==
O'Connor was born in Washington, D.C. His English-born mother, Sally O'Connor, was a dressage rider, judge and author. David began riding at a young age, and as a child participated in a cross-US horseback ride with his mother and brother, covering 3,000 miles over several months.

O'Connor married fellow equestrian Karen O'Connor, also an international three day event rider, on June 26, 1993. The pair became the first married couple to compete on the same US Olympic equestrian team when they rode with their team to a silver medal at the 1996 Summer Olympics. They rode to a second shared medal at the 2000 Summer Olympics, again marking a historical Olympic moment as the first husband and wife duo to do so. They operate equestrian training facilities in The Plains, Virginia and Ocala, Florida. When not involved in equestrian activities, O'Connor enjoys reading and golfing.

== Career ==
=== Competitive career ===
In 1986, O'Connor began riding in international competition for the US. Early in his career, O'Connor competed in numerous high-level events as part of the US team. He acted as an alternate (substitute) rider at the 1988 Summer Olympics. Riding Wilton Fair, he was part of the US team at the 1990 World Equestrian Games, where he placed 35th individually and the team took fourth. At the 1994 World Equestrian Games, he placed 44th individually riding On a Mission and again acted as an alternate for the US team.

O'Connor competed in two Olympic Games for the United States. At the 1996 Summer Olympics in Atlanta, Georgia, he took fifth place individually, riding Custom Made. Riding a second horse, Giltedge, he also helped the US team to a silver medal. At the 2000 Summer Olympics, again riding Custom Made, he took the gold medal, and helped the US team to a bronze aboard Giltedge. During the individual competition at the 2000 Games, he led each stage of the event, and made Olympic history with a record-breaking dressage score. Observers called the ride "accurate and precise with good cadence throughout." At the 1997 Badminton Horse Trials, O'Connor and Custom Made won the CCI4*, the top event at the trials, becoming only the second American pair to do so. In the 1998 World Equestrian Games, O'Connor, riding Giltedge, took an individual sixth place and helped the US team to a fourth place. Again riding Giltedge, O'Connor won silver at the 1999 Pan American Games and assisted the US team to a gold medal. The pair also rode to a team gold at the 2002 World Equestrian Games in Jerez, Spain. O'Connor was consistently ranked as one of the top three day event riders in the world by the Fédération Équestre Internationale, holding fourth place in 1996, third place in 1997 and first place in 2000. He was also the top eventing rider in the US, topping the United States Eventing Association (USEA) leaderboard, in 1998 and 1999. He was a three-time winner of the Rolex Kentucky Three Day, once at the CCI4* level and twice at the CCI3* level.

=== Administrative career ===
In 2002, both Custom Made and Giltedge were retired from competition. In 2004, O'Connor retired from competition and quickly became involved in administrative aspects of the three-day eventing world. He served as the President of the United States Equestrian Federation from 2004 to 2012. In 2006, O'Connor was appointed the International Technical Advisor to the Canadian national eventing team. In that capacity, he led the team to silver medals at the 2007 Pan American Games and the 2010 World Equestrian Games. In January 2013, O'Connor left the Canadian team after being appointed chef d'équipe to the US national eventing team.

=== Awards and honors ===
The USEA named O'Connor their Rider of the Year in 1996 and 1997, and in the same years named O'Connor's horse Lightfoot was the Horse of the Year. O'Connor was also named The Chronicle of the Horse's Eventing Horseman of the Year in 1996, in combination with his wife, Karen. In 1997, O'Connor was awarded the Whitney Stone Cup, an annual award by the United States Equestrian Federation which honors "an active competitor who displays consistent excellence in international competition and high standards of sportsmanlike conduct while serving as an ambassador for the United States and equestrian sport." In 1998, Lightfoot was named the USEA Horse of the Year, and in 1999, another O'Connor horse, Rattle & Hum, was awarded the honor. Rattle & Hum also took home The Chronicle of the Horse's Eventing Horse of the Year in 1999. The following year, The Chronicle of the Horse named O'Connor both Overall Horseman and Eventing Horseman of the Year, and his horse, Custom Made, was named both Overall Horse and Eventing Horse of the Year. Two years later, in 2002, Giltedge, O'Connor's other main horse, was named both Overall Horse and Eventing Horse of the Year. The United States Equestrian Federation named O'Connor their Equestrian of the Year twice, in 2000 and 2002. Also in 2002, O'Connor was awarded the USA Equestrian Sportsmanship Award. In 2009, O'Connor and Custom Made were inducted into the USEA Hall of Fame, and in 2012 Giltedge was awarded the same honor. As of 2013, four horses ridden by O'Connor (Giltedge, Custom Made, On a Mission and Wilton Fair) held positions in the list of the top 50 USEA high scoring horses.
