= Regis Prudhon =

French eventing rider

Personal information
- Nationality: French
- Born: May 23, 1975 (age 51) Ris-Orangis, France
- Height: 1.71 m (5 ft 7 in)
- Weight: 63 kg (139 lb)

Sport
- Sport: Eventing

Regis Prudhon (born 23 May 1975) is a French eventing rider who has competed nationally and internationally since the late 1990s.

== Early life and education ==
Prudhon was born in Ris-Orangis, France, the youngest of five children of Lucien Prudhon and Christianne Perrad Prudhon. During his youth, he practised skiing, fencing, and triathlon. He earned a French State Diploma as a ski instructor (BEES 1) in 1994 and completed the BEES 2 qualification in 2004.

He began riding horses at the age of ten and decided to pursue a professional equestrian career in the early 1990s after completing his baccalaureate in 1993. In 1996, he trained as a farrier, a craft he continued alongside his riding career. He obtained his riding instructor qualification in 2004 and trained under Rodolphe Scherer, William Fox-Pitt, and Pierre Cannamela.

== Career ==
Prudhon began competing internationally in eventing during the late 1990s, riding horses including Dionysos and Bayou Messipierre. In 2002, Prudhon finished seventh in the three-star international eventing competition at Pau, France, riding Dionysos.

During the following decade, he established himself on the international circuit with Debuit, competing in several of Europe's premier four- and five-star events. He won the HSBC training bursary at the 2010 Luhmühlen Horse Trials after finishing 12th, and went on to compete at the Badminton Horse Trials and Burghley Horse Trials.

In 2015, riding Kaiser HDB, Prudhon helped the French team secure third place at the CCIO4*-S Nations Cup at Houghton Hall. Three years later, the pair won the CCI*** Barroca d'Alva in Portugal, marking one of the most significant victories of his career. He also completed Badminton in 2018 aboard Kaiser HDB in 51st place and competed in the Event Rider Masters series at Haras de Jardy.

Later in 2018, Prudhon sustained a serious leg injury after an accident involving his horse Tarastro, which required multiple surgeries and temporarily interrupted his competitive career. He returned to international competition the following season, placing 15th at the Étoiles de Pau CCI5*-L in 2019 and continuing to campaign Tarastro at four- and five-star levels.

In 2021, Prudhon represented France at the CHIO Aachen CCIO4*-S Nations Cup aboard Tarastro, finishing 6th with the team. In 2022, he completed the CCI5*-L at the Etoiles de Pau aboard Tarastro, finishing 16th. By the conclusion of the 2025 season, Prudhon was ranked among France's leading professional event riders.

In 2026, he joined the French Grand National Eventing circuit alongside his children, Jules and Pénélope Prudhon. Their participation marked the first family team to compete together in the history of the series.

== Other activities ==
Alongside his sporting career, Prudhon has worked as a trainer, riding instructor, and horse producer. He managed the Écurie du Chêne between 2002 and 2017 before co-founding Horse Eventing and relocating to the Haras de Bory in Yvelines. He also trained Raju Singh Bhadoria.

He also developed and patented an innovative hydrotherapy recovery system for horses using a converted horse trailer. Following the sporting career of Debuit, he became involved in horse breeding using the stallion.

Additionally, he has competed regularly on the French Grand National FFE circuit, and launched a crowdfunding project aiming to prepare young horses for the 2028 Summer Olympics in Los Angeles.

== Selected results ==
All international results are sourced from official Fédération Équestre Internationale records.

=== International ===
- 2002 – 7th, CCI*** Pau – Dionysos
- 2010 – 12th, CCI**** Luhmühlen – Debuit
- 2012 – 27th, CCI**** Luhmühlen – Debuit
- 2012 – 45th, Burghley Horse Trials – Debuit
- 2015 – 3rd (team), CCIO4*-S Houghton Hall – Kaiser HDB
- 2016 – 3rd (team), CCIO4*-S Houghton Hall – Kaiser HDB
- 2018 – Winner, CCI*** Barroca d'Alva – Kaiser HDB
- 2018 – 51st, Badminton Horse Trials – Kaiser HDB
- 2019 – 5th, CCI4*-L Pratoni del Vivaro – Tarastro
- 2019 – 15th, CCI5*-L Pau – Tarastro
- 2020 – Winner, CCI3*-L Barroca d'Alva – Bennix de Borry
- 2021 – 7th, CCIO4*-S Strzegom – Tarastro
- 2021 – 6th (team), CCIO4*-S Aachen – Tarastro
- 2022 – 16th, CCI5*-L Pau – Tarastro
- 2023 – 3rd, CCI3*-S Saint-Quentin – Tarastro
- 2024 – 3rd, Rouen Indoor Cross – Inédit de Virton
- 2025 – 3rd, CCI3*-S Saulieu – Black Swan Decandie Z
- 2025 – 3rd (team), CCIO4*-S Avenches – Black Swan Decandie Z
