= Folk music festival of Siglufjörður =

Annual music festival in Iceland

Folk music festival of Siglufjörður Þjóðlagahátíðin á Siglufirði
- Status: Active
- Genre: Music
- Date: First Wednesday of July
- Frequency: Annual
- Venue: Folk Music Center
- Location: Siglufjörður
- Coordinates: 66.150°N 18.907°W
- Country: Iceland
- Years active: 2000–present
- Founder: Gunnsteinn Ólafsson
- Most recent: 2–6 July 2025
- Next event: 1–5 July 2026
- Website: Official website

The Folk music festival of Siglufjörður is a five-day music event, founded in 2000 by Gunnsteinn Ólafsson and held annually at the Folk Music Center in Siglufjörður, Iceland. The festival commences on the first Wednesday of July every year and ends on Sunday.

The main focus of the event is on Icelandic and Scandinavian folk music as well as world music and folk dances. Concerts are held in different locations of the town, including the Herring Era Museum, and the festival includes a variety of workshops.

The Folk Music Center of Siglufjörður also organizes a folk music academy in conjunction with the University of Iceland, to coincide with the festival. The academy's focus includes Icelandic folk dance; local traditional and folk music, including rimur, tvisöngur, and children's rhymes; and psalms.

== History ==
The first festival, an idea conceived by local conductor Gunnsteinn Ólafsson in 2000, was organized by the Folk Music Center in Siglufjörður as well as the Icelandic capital of Reykjavík, in partnership with the Herring Era Museum and the Siglufjörður church.

== Awards ==
In 2005, the festival received the Eyrarrósin award, a trophy sculpted by Steinunn Thorarinsdottir, for outstanding cultural achievement in rural areas.
