= Sidney de Souza =

Sidney de Souza may refer to:

- Sidney de Souza (athlete), Brazilian sprinter
- Sidney de Souza (equestrian), Brazilian equestrian
- Sidney (footballer, born 1972) (Sidney da Silva Souza), Brazilian footballer
