= Giltedge =

Event horse

- Breed: Irish Sport Horse
- Sire: Glenbar (Irish Sport Horse)
- Grandsire: Bahrain (Thoroughbred)
- Dam: Awkward Brief Mare
- Maternal grandsire: Awkward Brief
- Sex: Gelding
- Foaled: April 25, 1986 in Ireland
- Died: September 3, 2015 The Plains Virginia (age 29)
- Country: United States
- Colour: Dark bay, off hind sock
- Owner: Jacqueline Mars, Stonehall Farm
- Trainer: David O'Connor

Medal record

Equestrian

Olympic Games
Silver medal – second place	1996 Atlanta	Team eventing
Bronze medal – third place	2000 Sydney	Team eventing

World Championships
Bronze medal – third place	1998 Rome	Team eventing
Gold medal – first place	2002 Jerez	Team eventing

Pan American Games
Gold medal – first place	1999 Winnipeg	Team eventing
Silver medal – second place	1999 Winnipeg	Individual eventing

Giltedge was a 17 hands (68 inches, 173 cm) Irish Sport Horse that was ridden by American David O'Connor at the international level in the sport of eventing.

Giltedge, formally known as Giltex, was bought by Jackie Mars from Irish eventer Eric Smiley as a mount for American rider David O'Connor. Although described by his rider as being less inherently gifted when compared to some of his stable mates (such as Custom Made), Giltedge's work ethic helped him to succeed.

Giltedge's first three-day in the United States was the 1994 Fair Hill. The event ended in disaster when a misjudged take-off distance from the obstacle resulted in a fall for O'Connor. During the pair's second three-day, the gelding caught his leg on a fence and flipped, leading to a punctured lung for his rider. It wasn't until their third three-day, at the 1995 Fair Hill, where Giltedge showed his ability, finishing second by 0.1 penalties. After that event, the horse would never be out of the top ten placings.

Giltedge was selected for the United States eventing team for the 1996 Olympics in Atlanta. A good dressage test combined with a clean cross-country and stadium round, helped the team to clinch the silver medal by two penalties—the country's first eventing team medal in an Olympics or World Championship in 12 years. Giltedge also competed four years later at the 2000 Sydney Olympics, as part of the bronze medal team.

Giltedge's final three-day was the 2002 World Equestrian Games held in Jerez, Spain. The gelding was the first American horse on cross-country, and the course was found to be quite slick. A lack of traction due to studs that were too small, resulted in O'Conner's decision to slow down, so as to prevent a fall. Unfortunately, the pair finished with 30.40-time faults. However, a clear stadium round, one of only 5 in the competition, helped the United States capture a long-awaited team gold.

Giltedge was retired at the Rolex Kentucky Three Day in 2003. He enjoyed his retirement at Stonehall Farm and gave demonstrations with the O'Connors.

== Major Accomplishments ==
2002

- Horse of the Year, Chronicle of the Horse
- Team Gold, World Equestrian Games, Jerez, Spain

2001

- National Performance Horse Registry Silver Stirrup Award, Adv. Level Eventing Champion
- 1st Rolex Kentucky CCI****

2000

- Team Bronze Olympic Games, Sydney, Australia
- 8th Foxhall CCI***

1999

- Team Gold, Individual Silver Pan American Games, Winnipeg, Canada
- 1st North American Beaulieu CIC***

1998

- Team Bronze, 6th World Equestrian Games, Rome, Italy

1997

- National Performance Horse Registry Silver Stirrup Award, High Score Horse
- 1st, Fair Hill CCI***
- 3rd, Punchestwon CCI***

1996

- Team Silver Olympic Games, Atlanta, Georgia

1995

- 1st Fair Hill CCI***
