= Choynowski =

Choynowski (feminine: Choynowska) is a Polish surname.

- Mieczysław Choynowski, Polish psychologist and philosopher
- Piotr Choynowski, Polish writer, novelist and translator
- Rafał Choynowski, Polish equestrian
- Stanisława Argasińska-Choynowska (1888–1961), Polish prima donna, stage singer, and singing teacher

== See also ==
- Chojnowski
