= Serguei Fofanoff =

Brazilian equestrian (born 1968)

Personal information
- Born: 11 December 1968 (age 57) Ribeira, Brazil

Sport
- Sport: Equestrian
Medal record
Equestrian
Representing Brazil
Pan American Games
Gold medal – first place	1995 Mar del Plata	Team eventing
Silver medal – second place	1999 Winnipeg	Team eventing
Bronze medal – third place	2011 Guadalajara	Team eventing
South American Championships
Gold medal – first place	2014 Barretos	Team eventing
Bronze medal – third place	2014 Barretos	Individual eventing

Serguei Fofanoff (born 11 December 1968) is a Brazilian equestrian. He competed at the 1992 Summer Olympics, the 1996 Summer Olympics, the 2000 Summer Olympics and the 2012 Summer Olympics.

Of Russian origin, Fofanoff's grandfather was a member of the cavalry who fought Bolsheviks forces during the Russian Revolution in 1917.
