= Might Tango =

American eventing horse

- Breed: American Thoroughbred
- Sire: Mighty Mine
- Grandsire: Mighty Story
- Dam: Bettango
- Maternal grandsire: Mustango
- Sex: Gelding
- Foaled: 1971
- Country: United States
- Colour: Gray
- Trainer: Bruce Davidson

Might Tango
Medal record

World Championships
Gold medal – first place	1978 Lexington	Individual Eventing
Bronze medal – third place	1978 Lexington	Team Eventing

Might Tango (1971 - 1995) was a top eventing horse trained and ridden by American Bruce Davidson.

Might Tango was found by Robert Tindle as a mount for Bruce Davidson. The gelding had raced as a two-year-old in California before he began his eventing career. As a relatively inexperienced eventing horse, Might Tango took Davidson to a win at the 1978 World Championships in Lexington, earning the individual gold medal and team bronze at the young age of seven.

Might Tango lived to the age of 24, and is now buried at Davidson's Chesterland Farm in Unionville, Pennsylvania.

== Pedigree ==
Pedigree of Might Tango
Sire Mighty Mine 1958	Mighty Story; 1943	Mahmoud; 1933	Blenheim - 1927
Sire Mighty Mine 1958	Mighty Story; 1943	Mahmoud; 1933	Mah Mahal - 1928
Sire Mighty Mine 1958	Mighty Story; 1943	Little Lie; 1932	Sickle - 1924
Sire Mighty Mine 1958	Mighty Story; 1943	Little Lie; 1932	Fib - 1928
Sire Mighty Mine 1958	Mistress Mine; 1945	Roman; 1937	Sir Gallahad - 1920
Sire Mighty Mine 1958	Mistress Mine; 1945	Roman; 1937	Buckup - 1928
Sire Mighty Mine 1958	Mistress Mine; 1945	Maitresse Royale; 1938	Vatout - 1926
Sire Mighty Mine 1958	Mistress Mine; 1945	Maitresse Royale; 1938	Royal Mistress - 1920
Dam Bettango 1966	Mustango; 1952	Mustang; 1941	Mieuxce - 1933
Dam Bettango 1966	Mustango; 1952	Mustang; 1941	Buzz Fuzz - 1933
Dam Bettango 1966	Mustango; 1952	Lion Cub; 1939	Coup De Lyon - 1930
Dam Bettango 1966	Mustango; 1952	Lion Cub; 1939	Seaton - ~1929
Dam Bettango 1966	Betti; 1955	Lyco; 1943	Sickle - 1924
Dam Bettango 1966	Betti; 1955	Lyco; 1943	Carla - 1936
Dam Bettango 1966	Betti; 1955	Bette Royal; 1948	Beti Bat - 1934
Dam Bettango 1966	Betti; 1955	Bette Royal; 1948	Royal Kate - 1935
