= Nicola Delli Santi =

Italian equestrian

Personal information
- Nationality: Italian
- Born: 4 April 1970 (age 54); Milan, Italy

Sport
- Sport: Equestrian

Nicola Delli Santi (born 4 April 1970) is an Italian equestrian. He competed in the team eventing at the 1996 Summer Olympics.
