= Jürgen Blum =

German equestrian

Personal information
- Nationality: German
- Born: 21 April 1956 (age 70) Munich, Germany

Sport
- Sport: Equestrian
Medal record
Equestrian
Representing West Germany
European Championships
Silver medal – second place	1987 Luhmühlen	Team eventing
Bronze medal – third place	1985 Burghley	Team eventing

Jürgen Blum (born 21 April 1956) is a German equestrian. He competed in the team eventing at the 1996 Summer Olympics.
