= André Giovanini =

Brazilian equestrian

Personal information
- Born: 8 July 1969 (age 56) Limeira, Brazil

Sport
- Sport: Equestrian
Medal record
Equestrian
Representing Brazil
Pan American Games
| Gold medal – first place | 1995 Mar del Plata | Team eventing |
| Bronze medal – third place | 1995 Mar del Plata | Individual eventing |

André Giovanini (born 8 July 1969) is a Brazilian equestrian. He competed in the team eventing at the 1996 Summer Olympics.
