= Jacques Dulcy =

French equestrian

Personal information
- Nationality: French
- Born: 11 January 1954 (age 71); Avignon, France

Sport
- Sport: Equestrian

Jacques Dulcy (born 11 January 1954) is a French equestrian. He competed in the team eventing at the 1996 Summer Olympics.
