= Therese Washtock =

Canadian equestrian

Personal information
- Nationality: Canadian
- Born: 28 March 1963 (age 62) Vancouver, British Columbia, Canada

Sport
- Sport: Equestrian

Therese Washtock (born 28 March 1963) is a Canadian equestrian. She competed in the team eventing at the 1996 Summer Olympics.
