= Custom Made =

Irish Sport Horse

- Breed: Irish Sport Horse
- Sire: Bassompierre (Thoroughbred)
- Grandsire: Khalkis (Thoroughbred)
- Dam: Purple Heather (Irish Draught Sport Horse)
- Maternal grandsire: Ben Purple (Irish Draught)
- Sex: Gelding
- Foaled: May 26, 1985; Ireland
- Died: October 2, 2019 (aged 34)
- Country: USA
- Colour: Dark Bay, Star, stripe
- Breeder: Kitty Horgan and Elizabeth O’Flynn
- Owner: Xandarius, LLC (Joseph P. Zada)

Olympic medal record

Equestrian
| Gold medal – first place | 2000 Sydney | Individual eventing |

Custom Made (May 26, 1985 – October 2, 2019) was an Irish Sport Horse standing 17.1 hands (69 inches, 175 cm) who was ridden by American David O'Connor at the international level in the sport of eventing.

Custom Made was foaled in Ireland. Joseph Zada imported the horse, whose barn name was "Tailor", in January 1995, from a young rider in Britain, as a mount for David O'Connor. The horse was incredibly strong on cross-country, not very careful in show jumping, but an athletic jumper and a very good mover.

O'Connor and Custom Made made their debut at Rolex Kentucky Three Day in the CCI*** division in 1995. The pair won the dressage phase by almost 12 penalty points, but the horse was a run-away on cross-country and had 11.5 penalties in the show jumping. Although O'Connor and Custom Made were able to win their first three-day by a slim margin of 0.1 penalties, it was clear that the horse needed additional training before he could be truly successful.

Custom Made was then shipped back to Britain. O'Connor placed the horse in a Citation bridle for cross-country, which seemed to help prevent the horse from running away with his rider. The pair won the Gatcombe Horse Trials, and was selected for the United States team in the Open Eventing European Championships, held in Pratoni del Vivaro, Italy. Although the pair did well in dressage, cross country proved to be a disaster. The new bridle pinched the mouth of the horse as he was approaching a ditch, and he spun around so quickly that O'Connor fell off. The following day, the horse seemed to remember the incident at the ditch and refused to jump the second liverpool on course, which eliminated the pair from the competition.

Upset with the performance at the European Championships, O'Connor began reintroducing Custom Made to the jumps he would see at an event, focusing on ditches and liverpools. They then entered the Badminton Horse Trials, knowing that a good run there would put them back on the selector's list for the 1996 U.S. Olympic team. Custom Made won the dressage at Badminton, and was just one second over the optimum time on cross-country. Stadium was also greatly improved from their past performances, with just one rail down, and Tailor finished in an impressive third place.

Their record earned them a spot on the U.S. team, as an individual competitor (the gelding's lack of consistency in show jumping kept him off the team squad). Custom Made did well in the dressage, but had 30.8 time penalties on cross-country and lost a shoe, finishing in 8th place. In stadium, they pulled two rails, but managed to finish in 5th place overall.

Custom Made went back to Badminton a second time in 1997, and was impressive in every phase. After finishing second in dressage, he added only 0.4 time penalties on cross-country, and 0.25 time penalties in stadium. Fellow competitor Ian Stark was in the lead after cross-country, but a poor showing jumping round with 5 rails down dropped him several places, leaving David O'Connor and Custom Made the winners of their first CCI ****.

Tailor went on to have his greatest performance yet at the 2000 Olympics in Sydney, where he and his rider won the first eventing Olympic gold medal for the USA in 24 years and put up the best score in Olympic history, despite the fact that O'Connor nearly went off-course. This fantastic performance prompted the USCTA (now USEA) to name him as Horse of the Year.

In 2002, Custom Made had a good finish to his career when O’Connor rode him to victory in the U.S. Equestrian Team Eventing Three-Star Fall Championship at the Fair Hill International in Fair Hill, Maryland. O’Connor had announced prior to the event that it would be Custom Made’s final competition and the horse went out and delivered yet another championship performance.

Custom Made was retired in a ceremony at the 2004 Rolex Kentucky Three Day and along with O'Connor, inducted into the Eventing Hall of Fame in 2009.

Custom Made died on October 1, 2019, at the age of 34 at his retirement haven in The Plains, Virginia. He outlived the last of his Fab Four companions (Biko: January 21, 1984 – January 29, 2014; Giltedge: April 25, 1986 – September 3, 2015; & Prince Panache: April 29, 1984 – May 1, 2016) by more than three years, and was one of the longest lived horses to have participated in jumping and one of the longest lived horses to have stood at 17 hands or more.

== Competition records ==
2002

- 1st Fair Hill International Three-day Event CCI ***
- 1st Over The Walls HT (Advanced)
- 2nd Groton House Farm II Open HT (Advanced)
- 2nd Poplar Place HT (Advanced)
- 3rd Red Hills HT (Advanced)

2001

- 4th Morven Park Three-day Event (Advanced)
- 2nd Middleburg HT OI
- 3rd Kentucky Three-day Event CCI ****
- 14th Southern Pines HT (Advanced)

2000

- Individual gold, Olympic Games at Sydney
- 7th Coconino County Summer HT OI (rider: Manuela Inez Propfe)
- 6th Kentucky Three-day Event CCI ****
- 6th Fair Hill at Menfelt HT (Advanced)
- 7th Morven Park Spring HT (Advanced)
- 5th Sharpton Winter III One Day HT AI

1999

- 4th Blenheim Three-day Event CCI ***
- 10th CDCTA HT OI

1997

- 50th Burghley Three-day Event CCI ***
- 1st Badminton Three-day Event CCI ****
- 31st Beaulieu North American Classic HT (Advanced)
- 4th Morven Park Spring HT (Advanced)
- 13th Sharpton Winter HT AI

1996

- 5th place individually, Olympic Games in Atlanta
- 12th place North Georgia International Open Invitational HT (Advanced)
- 13th Groton House Farm HT (Advanced)
- 3rd Badminton Three-day Event CCI ****
- 21st Beaulieu North American Classic HT (Advanced)
- 5th Morven Park Spring HT (Advanced)
- 3rd Sharpton Winter HT OI

1995

- 1st Kentucky Three-Day Event CCI ***
- 4th Beaulieu North American Classic HT (Advanced)
- 2nd Morven Park Spring HT (Advanced)
- 3rd Southern Pines HT OI
- 3rd Pine Top Farms HT OI
