= Christoph Meier (equestrian) =

Swiss equestrian (born 1952)

Personal information
- Nationality: Swiss
- Born: 27 October 1952 (age 72)

Sport
- Sport: Equestrian

Christoph Meier (born 27 October 1952) is a Swiss equestrian. He competed in the team eventing at the 1996 Summer Olympics.
