= Gary Parsonage =

British equestrian (born 1963)

Personal information
- Nationality: British
- Born: 2 June 1963 (age 63) Chester, England

Sport
- Sport: Equestrian
Medal record
Equestrian
Representing Great Britain
World Championships
Bronze medal – third place	1998 Rome	Team eventing

Gary Parsonage (born 2 June 1963) is a British equestrian. He competed in the team eventing at the 1996 Summer Olympics.
