= Pony Club =

International youth organization

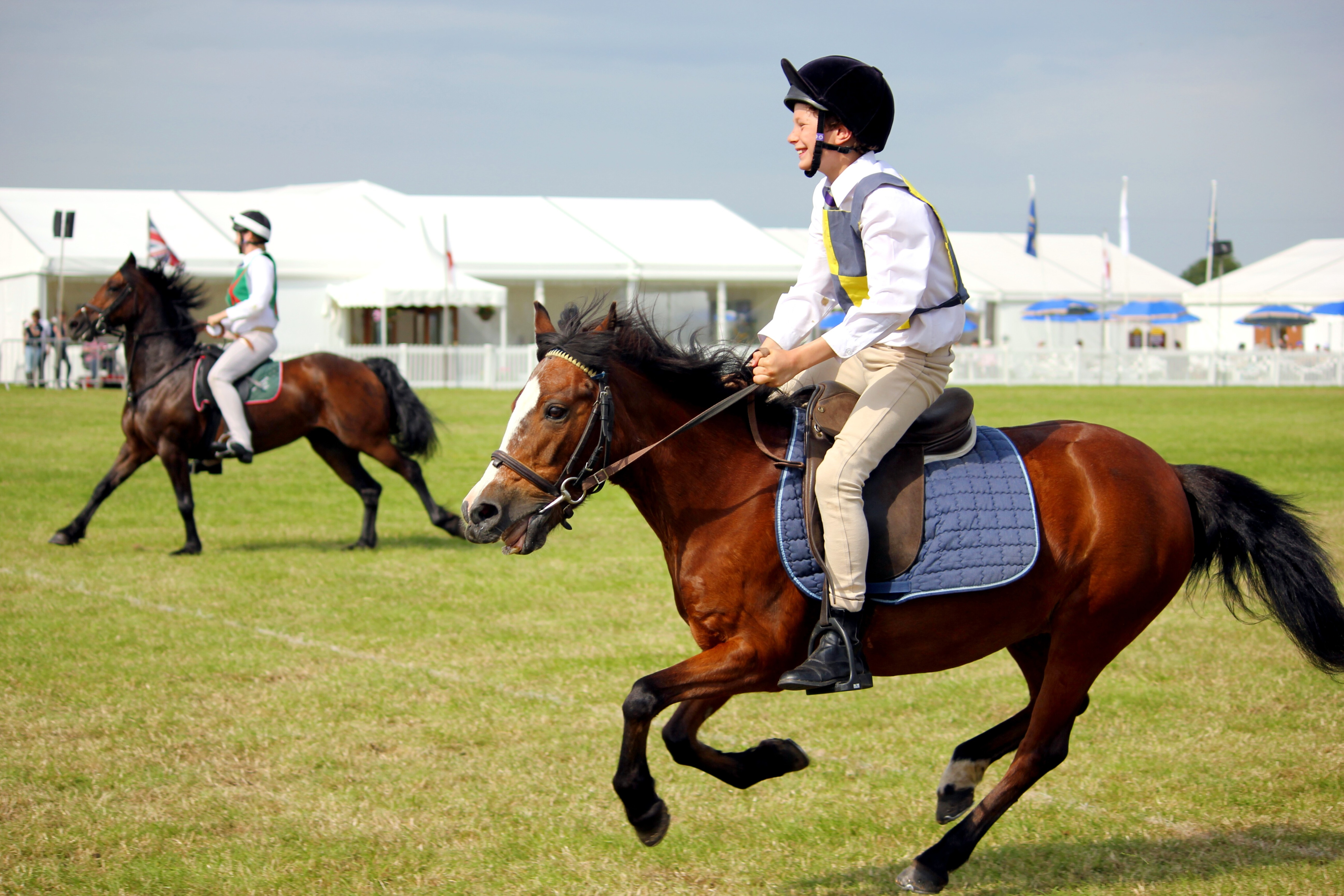
Pony Club Games at the Cheshire Show (2012)

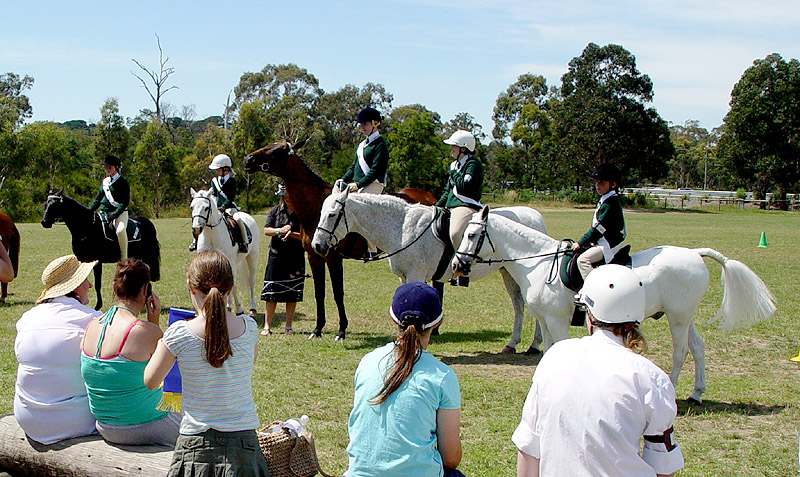
Monash Pony Club, located in Melbourne, Australia

Pony Club is an international youth organization devoted to educating youth about horses and riding. Pony Club organizations exist in over thirty countries worldwide.

== Overview ==
Pony clubs began in England in 1929 by Harry Faudel-Phillips to encourage children to start riding. Memberships increased quickly, and the idea of pony clubs spread rapidly, with clubs started in other nations—Canada in 1934, Australia in 1939, New Zealand in 1944, and the United States in 1954. By 2008 there were over 100,000 Pony Club members worldwide. Each national Pony Club organization has the ability to define its own structure. There is no strict international governing body; however, national Pony Club organizations often work together for international competitions and exchanges. Further structuring is dependent upon the particular national organization, but most local clubs belong to regions, in which they compete to qualify for national and international competitions.

The core unit of any national Pony Club organization is the local club. Local clubs vary in size, but are generally confined to members within a relatively small geographic area. Multiple local clubs may conduct joint mounted and unmounted meetings, and usually compete together in regional competitions. Ages of participants range from very young to twenty-five. Older pony clubbers may provide assistance to younger members. Participation is not restricted to ponies; many clubbers ride horses.

The object of Pony Club is: To encourage young people to ride and to learn to enjoy all kinds of sport connected with horses and riding. To provide instruction in riding and horsemastership, and to instill in members the proper care of their animals. To promote the highest ideals of sportsmanship, citizenship, and loyalty, thereby cultivating strength of character and self-discipline.

— From the Pony Club Council of Great Britain

The Pony Club program offers certification of a member's proficiency in skills and theory. In the United States, the levels start with beginner levels D1, D2, and D3, progress through the intermediate levels C1, C2, and C3, and proceed to the advanced levels HB, B, HA, and A. All other countries use a different certification system, generally progressing along lines such as that of Great Britain, where the tests are E, E+, D, D+, C, C+, and the advanced tests, B, B+, the Lungeing Test, AH, and A. Very few pony clubbers sit the 'A' test each year. In the United Kingdom only 13 passed in 2017, and only 9 passed of the 27 who sat in 2008. The Pony Club publishes manuals and books which provide all the information needed to earn certificates and achievement badges. They have a range of useful information from buying a horse to looking after it and competing with it. They teach pony clubbers horsemanship, how to care for their horses, and the responsibilities and positive outcomes of owning a horse.

== Activities ==
The Pony Club promotes the education of young people through instruction and examination in riding, horse care and animal welfare. At camps and rallies children are taught best practices in a fun and safe environment.

- Rally days: There are different activities at a rally day including showjumping, dressage, cross country, troop drill, mounted games, polocrosse, horse care and theory. These days can be mounted or unmounted. Each club's rally day differs slightly.
- Camp is an immersive experience where members come together with their mounts, generally for a week at a time. Formats and events vary by club, just like rally days. Australia holds a national camp for the top qualifying riders from each state, offering top-level instruction to promising young equestrians.
- Certificates: Riders are encouraged to undertake various proficiency tests according to their age and ability, commencing with the basic 'E' test in the United Kingdom, South Africa, Ireland, and Australia, 'D' test in New Zealand, or 'D1' test in the USA through to the 'A' test in all which is generally the highest level awarded. These certificates aim to encourage improvement in knowledge and skills. They are viewed as a measure of a rider's progress. In working towards these tests, riders acquire valuable knowledge and skills, which enhance their riding experience.
- Competitions: To supplement rally days other activities are offered such as gymkhanas, camps, trail rides, lectures and films, visits to places of interest, and demonstrations. Inter-club competitions are often held in the form of a gymkhana, which has a mix of show riding events, sporting and showjumping competitions.
- Championships are regional competitions for those who have performed well in local competitions. A country may have regional, state and national championships.

== National organizations ==
=== Pony Club International Alliance ===
For many decades, pony clubs in each nation were not directly associated with the original English organization though they followed along the goals, structure and guidelines of the English organization. Starting in 2000, several national pony club organizations got together and formed the Pony Club International Alliance (PCIA), and in 2018 they agreed to work toward establishing a global identity. As of 2024, the PCIA nation members included The Pony Club (UK), United States Pony Clubs, Canadian Pony Club, Pony Club South Africa, Pony Club Hong Kong, Pony Club Australia, and New Zealand Pony Clubs Association.

=== The Pony Club (UK) ===
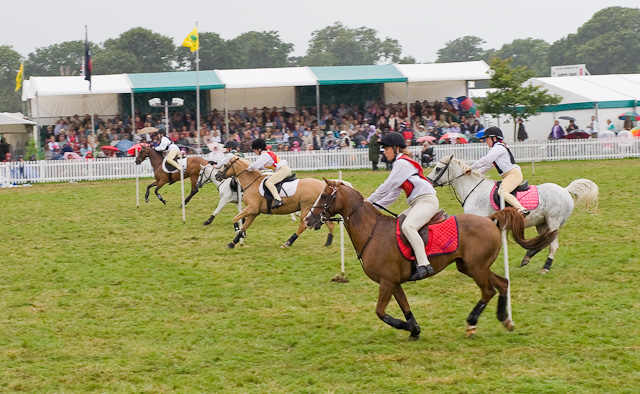
Pony Club mounted games in UK (2009)

This is the organization for the United Kingdom. In 1929, Harry Faudel-Phillips founded the Pony Club in Britain as a youth group of the Institute of the Horse which was run by military men. It was formed to encourage children to start riding, while providing them with opportunities in the field that they would not be able to reach on their own. The pony group grew rapidly, from 300 members in 1930, to over 10,000 in 1935. In 1947, the Institute of the Horse and Pony Club joined with the National Horse Association of Great Britain to form the British Horse Society. On 1 January 1997, The Pony Club was granted independent charitable status, separating from the British Horse Society (with which it continues to collaborate), and joined British Equestrian as a member body.

The Pony Club is divided into nineteen areas which are subdivided into branches. Each branch is administered by a district commissioner and a voluntary committee in charge of organising activities for the branch. Membership is open to anyone up until the end of the year in which they turn 25 years old. There are two types of membership: branch members have their own pony, and centre members borrow one from centre riding schools. Competitions are held at branches and centres, and there is also a national championship. As of 2024, there were around 330 Branches and 300 linked riding centres in the UK.

Growth	1947	1952	1962	2010	2018
Branch Membership (UK)	17,082	18,905	31,349	32,435	23,126
No. of Branches (UK)	167	201	255	345	336

=== Pony Club Australia ===
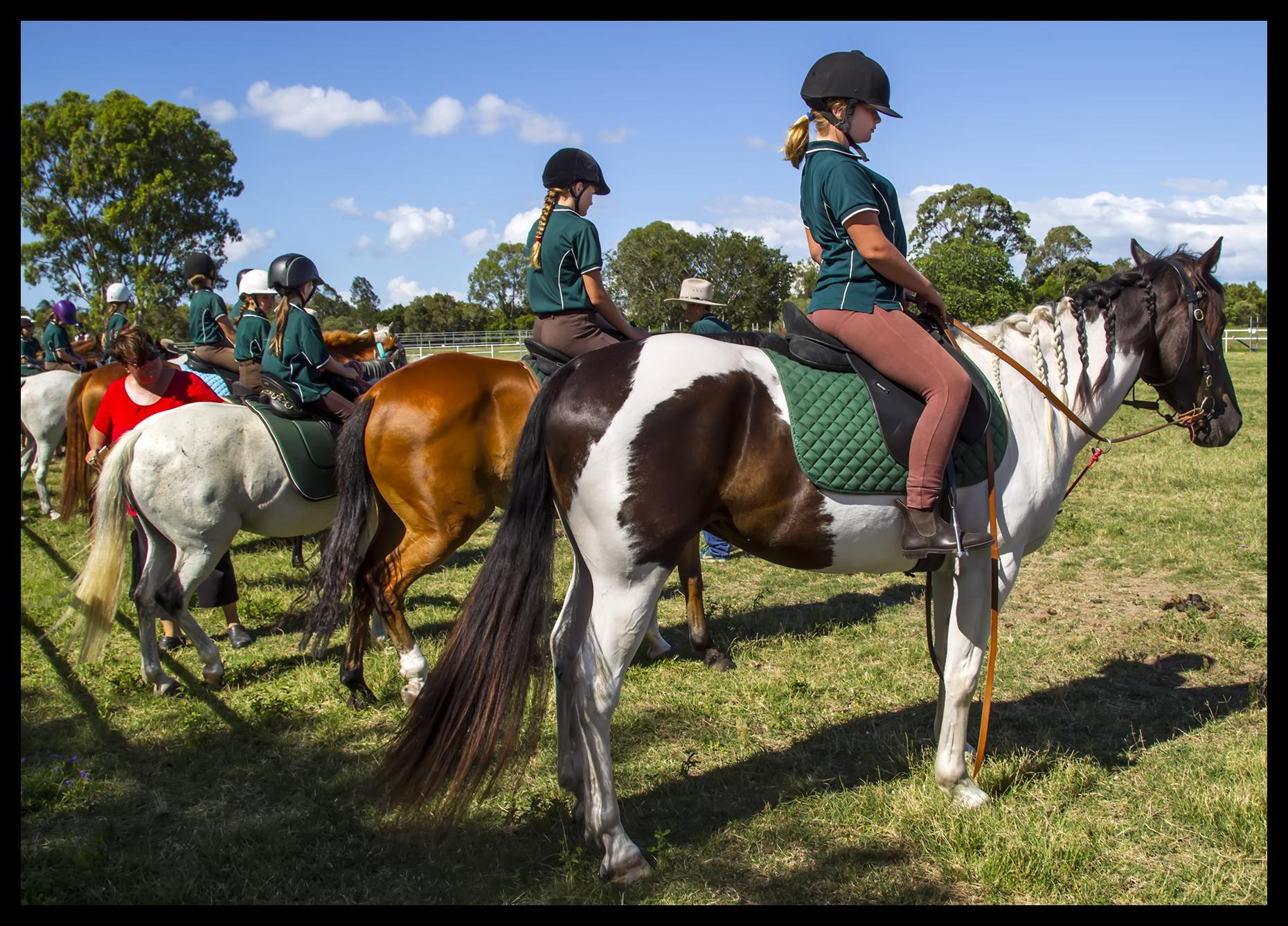
Members at a meet (2014)

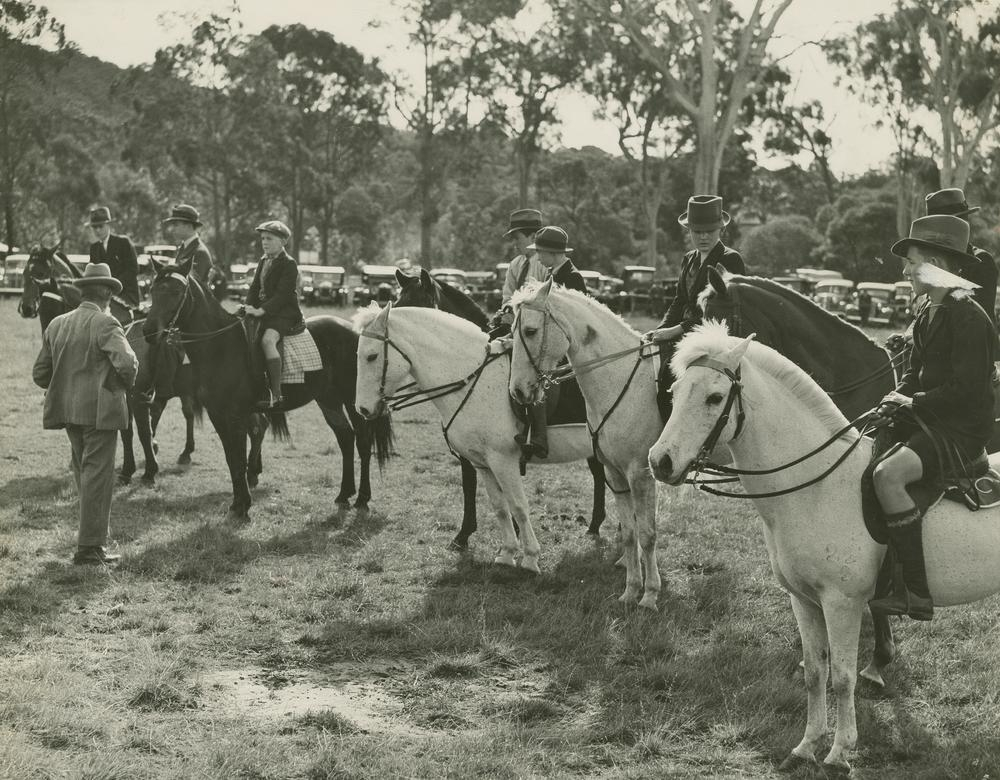
Pony Club members being judged in Brisbane, Queensland c. 1941

The first Pony Club in Australia was formed in 1939 at Ingleburn, New South Wales. Many early Pony Clubs were affiliated with the British Horse Society and Pony Club and used their resources–syllabus, instruction notes, even the badges and ties. As of 2008, Australia had the largest Pony Club membership in the world with around 40,000 members and over 800 local clubs.

Pony Club Australia Ltd (PCA) is a nonprofit company limited by guarantee. It cooperates with Equestrian Australia, the national governing body for equestrian sports in Australia, and is recognized by the Australian Sports Commission. PCA is the largest equestrian association in Australia, and is divided into seven state clubs—Western Australia, Northern Territory, South Australia, Queensland, New South Wales, Victoria, and Tasmania. The state clubs are further divided into zones, each of which may contain dozens of local clubs. PCA's members are the state Pony Club associations and members of Pony Clubs across Australia.

Membership is open to those from 3 to 80 years old. Each club has its own rules about age restrictions, but generally junior members are under 17 years old, associate members between 17 and 24, and senior members are 25 and over. Competitions and instruction are generally for those under 25, however some local clubs have opened activities for adult riders. Membership is open to those who don't have their own horse through "centre membership", a program where members can use horses from accredited riding centres across Australia.

PCA members participate in all the usual internationally recognized competitive equestrian disciplines, as well as mounted games, and uniquely Australian sports such as campdrafting and Stockman's Challenge. PCA club teams have participated in national championships and international competitions such as the Inter-Pacific Championships.

Australian Pony Club members have gone on to win medals on the Australian Olympic equestrian team and in world championships, such as Phillip Dutton (5 medals), Shane Rose (3 medals), Wayne Roycroft (3), Clayton Fredericks (3), Stuart Tinney (2), Sonja Johnson (2), Gillian Rolton (2), Megan Jones (1), Wendy Schaeffer (1), Barry Roycroft (1), and Edwina Tops-Alexander.

=== New Zealand Pony Clubs Association ===
The first Pony Club in New Zealand was started in 1944 by Dorothy Campbell. The New Zealand Pony Clubs Association (NZPCA) was established in 1946 and was associated with the British Horse Society and Pony Club at that time. As of 2024, NZPCA consists of 16 areas, 90 clubs, 136 branches and over 7,500 members. Competitions are held at the branch, club, area and national levels.

=== United States Pony Clubs ===
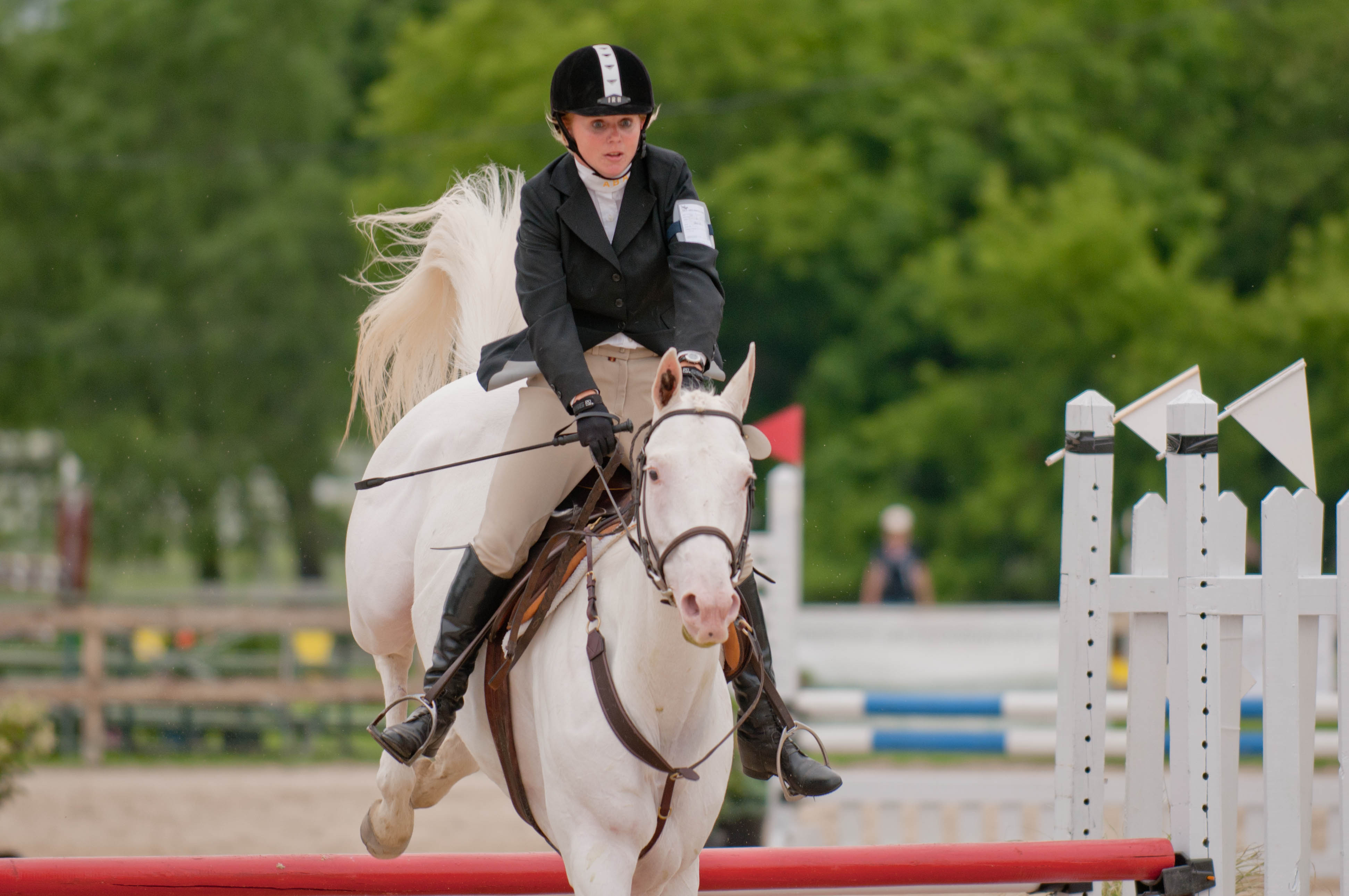
A Pony Club Horse Trials in Illinois, 2011

The United States Pony Clubs, Inc. (USPC) was incorporated in 1954 starting with just 12 local clubs, growing to several hundred local clubs across most of the US states by 1980. The national office is at the Kentucky Horse Park in Lexington, Kentucky.

Local clubs hold rallies where members compete within teams. USPC holds a national championship competition each year for those who have qualified at regional rallies or recognized horse shows. Every second year, a week long festival of competition and education is held at the Kentucky Horse Park.
