= Dr. Peaches =

Event horse

- Breed: Thoroughbred
- Sire: Troubled Area
- Grandsire: Pago Pago
- Dam: Doc's Last Dollar
- Maternal grandsire: Tudorich
- Sex: Gelding
- Foaled: 1976
- Country: USA
- Colour: Bay, star & snip
- Trainer: Bruce Davidson

Dr. Peaches was a horse ridden by American Bruce Davidson in the sport of eventing.

Dr. Peaches was found as a yearling for Davidson by Robert Tindle. The horse was attacked by a stallion when a foal, which caused him to be nervous round other horses, although he was a very well-tempered horse with a lot of character. However, Davidson created a partnership and the pair had an outstanding career.

Dr. Peaches was ranked number 6 on the list of Top Ten All American High Point Event Horses of the Century. He also won the Rolex Kentucky Three Day a record three times (now tied with Winsome Andante): in 1984, 1988, and 1989. In his 1984 run, the gelding completed cross country with the second fastest time, only one second slower than Davidson's other mount, Beacon Charm. He was also within the optimum time in 1988, after Davidson rode him with two broken ribs. Dr. Peaches lived into his mid-twenties.
