= Marius Marro =

Swiss equestrian

Personal information
- Nationality: Swiss
- Born: 16 December 1955 (age 69)

Sport
- Sport: Equestrian

Marius Marro (born 16 December 1955) is a Swiss equestrian. He competed in the team eventing at the 1996 Summer Olympics.
