= Claire Smith (equestrian) =

Canadian equestrian (born 1963)

Personal information
- Born: 10 April 1963 (age 63) Ottawa, Ontario, Canada

Sport
- Sport: Equestrian

Claire Smith (born 10 April 1963) is a Canadian equestrian. She competed in the team eventing at the 1996 Summer Olympics.
