= Bodo Battenberg =

German equestrian

Personal information
- Full name: Bodo Kurt Battenberg
- Nationality: German
- Born: 20 May 1963 (age 63) Münster, West Germany

Sport
- Sport: Equestrian
Medal record
Equestrian
Representing Germany
European Championships
Silver medal – second place	1999 Luhmühlen	Team eventing

Bodo Battenberg (born 20 May 1963) is a German equestrian. He competed in the team eventing at the 1996 Summer Olympics.
