= Chojnowski =

Chojnowski (feminine: Chojnowska; plural: Chojnowscy) is a Polish surname. Notable people with this surname include:

- Krystyna Chojnowska-Liskiewicz (1936–2021), Polish naval engineer and sailor
- Patryk Chojnowski (born 1990), Polish para table tennis player
- Silvana Chojnowski (born 1994), Polish footballer

== See also ==
- Choynowski
- Chojnów Landscape Park
