= Raju Singh Bhadoria =

Indian equestrian

Personal information
- Nationality: Indian
- Born: 2005 (age 20–21) Pachera, Bhind district, Madhya Pradesh, India

Sport
- Sport: Equestrian
- Event: Eventing
- Club: Madhya Pradesh State Equestrian Academy
- Coached by: Captain Bhagirath Singh; Regis Prudhon

Raju Singh Bhadoria (born c. 2005) is an Indian equestrian rider who competes in the discipline of eventing. He attracted national attention after qualifying for the 2022 Asian Games, becoming one of the few Indian riders to achieve the qualification standard for the event. Bhadoria earned qualification through his performance at the CCI Two-Star Eventing Competition organised at the ASC Centre in Bengaluru, where he completed the qualifying event with 40.8 penalties.

Coming from a farming family in rural Madhya Pradesh, Bhadoria's rise in Indian equestrian sport has been regarded as unusual because equestrian disciplines in India have traditionally been dominated by riders from military institutions and affluent backgrounds. He later represented India in international competitions and trained under French eventing coach Regis Prudhon

== Early life and background ==
Bhadoria was born into an underprivileged farming family in Pachera village near Harpalpur in the Bhind district of Madhya Pradesh. His father, Sujan Singh Bhadoria, is a specially-abled farmer who owns a small plot of land. Unlike many professional equestrians, Bhadoria did not come from a family involved in horse riding or competitive sport.

His introduction to equestrianism came in 2015 when, at the age of eleven, he visited his maternal uncle, Arvind Singh Parihar, who worked as a horse groomer and caretaker at the Madhya Pradesh State Equestrian Academy in Bhopal. During the visit, he developed an interest in horses, started assisting with feeding and cleaning them, and was subsequently admitted to the academy after being scouted during a talent hunt programme. He received his early coaching from Chief Coach Captain Bhagirath Singh at the academy, where he developed skills in cross-country riding, show jumping, and dressage. During the early stages of his sporting career, he continued his school education while training full-time at the academy.

== Career ==
=== Junior and national career ===
Bhadoria progressed through the junior ranks at the Madhya Pradesh State Equestrian Academy and emerged as one of the state's leading young riders, eventually earning a selection to India's youth equestrian team. In recognition of his achievements, the Government of Madhya Pradesh honoured him with the Eklavya Award in 2020, one of the state's highest sporting honors for outstanding young athletes.

Bhadoria continued competing in national eventing competitions after joining the senior ranks. In 2021, he won the bronze medal in the National Cross Country One-Star competition held in Meerut, finishing with 44 penalty points riding his horse 'Chandani'. In February 2023, he won the individual gold medal at the Senior National Equestrian Championship held in Mumbai. At the 2023–24 Senior National Equestrian Championship, he secured an individual bronze in the two-star cross country event and helped the academy team win a gold medal in the team category.

=== Asian Games qualification and international career ===
In February 2023, Bhadoria qualified for the 2022 Asian Games after meeting the Minimum Eligibility Requirement (MER) during the CCI Two-Star Eventing competition at the ASC Centre in Bengaluru. He completed the event with 40.8 penalties, having previously cleared trial stages in Delhi and Jaipur to secure his spot as the youngest member of the Indian four-rider contingent. His qualification received widespread media attention due to his rural, non-military background in a sport generally associated with economically privileged backgrounds.

Following his qualification, Bhadoria began training under French coach Regis Prudhon in Europe. In April 2023, he won the Eventing Cross Country One-Star competition at Grosbois near Paris, France. Riding a horse named Louk, he completed the course with 23 penalties to claim the gold medal, finishing ahead of French riders Frederic Gremont and Alexia Russel Sauque. In December 2024, Bhadoria secured qualification for the 2025 Asian Continental Championships in Pattaya, Thailand, after winning the FEI Concours Complet International (CCI) 3* (short) event in Jaipur with his horse Mawillan.

== Riding discipline ==
Bhadoria competes primarily in eventing, an Olympic equestrian discipline combining dressage, cross-country, and show jumping. Success in eventing requires both horse and rider to perform consistently across all three phases while accumulating the fewest penalty points.

== Achievements ==
- Recipient of the Eklavya Award from the Government of Madhya Pradesh (2020).
- Bronze medal – National Cross Country One-Star Championship (2021).
- Gold medal – Senior National Equestrian Championship (2023).
- Gold medal – Eventing Cross Country One-Star competition, Grosbois, France (2023).
- Team Gold & Individual Bronze – Senior National Equestrian Championship (2024).
- Gold medal – FEI CCI 3* Eventing, Jaipur (2024).

== See also ==
- Equestrian Federation of India
- Equestrianism
