= Gunnsteinn Ólafsson =

Icelandic conductor (born 1962)

Gunnsteinn Ólafsson (born 1962) is an Icelandic conductor of orchestra, musical ensembles, and opera. He is the founder of the Siglufjörður Folk Festival and the Iceland Youth Symphony Orchestra.

== Biography ==
Gunnsteinn was born in Siglufjörður but grew up in Kópavogur. He studied violin and composition at the Reykjavík College of Music, composition at the Franz Liszt Academy of Music in Budapest between 1983 and 1987, and conducting and music theory at the Hochschule für Musik in Freiburg, Germany. He graduated in 1992. Gunnsteinn spent half a year in Italy working on music by Claudio Monteverdi. He then introduced the most important works by the Italian composer to Icelandic listeners, including L'Orfeo and Vespers. He also spent half a year in Finland, studying orchestral and choral conducting.

Gunnsteinn started his career as a conductor in 1994 by winning second prize at the Young Scandinavian Conductors Competition in Bergen, Norway, where the jury was chaired by Mstislav Rostropovich. He worked with all the major orchestras and music ensembles in Iceland, including the Iceland Symphony Orchestra and CAPUT Chamber Orchestra, and conducted operas such as Don Giovanni and The Magic Flute by Mozart, Orfeo ed Euridice by Gluck, La Forza del Destino by Verdi and Der Freischütz by Weber, the last one sung in his own Icelandic translation. Gunnsteinn has also conducted orchestras in North and South America. In 1998, Gunnsteinn was a judge on Gettu betur.

In 2000, Gunnsteinn established the Folk music festival of Siglufjörður, where Icelandic folk music is emphasized as well as music from other countries. In 2006 he established a Folk Music Center in Siglufjörður with video recordings he produced with Langmark Film of people performing Icelandic folk music. Gunnsteinn also performed Icelandic folk songs himself for foreigners in Iceland since 1982 and at festivals abroad.

In 2004, Gunnsteinn founded the Iceland Youth Symphony Orchestra. As well as conducting that orchestra, he taught at the Iceland Academy of Arts and Reykjavík College of Music. In 2004, Gunnsteinn edited a book on 200 rimur songs, the so-called Silfurplötur Iðunnar (Iðunn's Silver Platters), the first new publication on Icelandic folk music since 1906. In September 2007, he was engaged as chorus master at the University of Iceland.

Gunnsteinn has composed music for choirs and solo singers. In 2015, his children's opera Marguerite (Baldursbrá) was performed at Harpa Concert Hall in Reykjavik.
