= Koris Vieules =

French equestrian

Personal information
- Nationality: French
- Born: 9 October 1970 (age 54); Brive-la-Gaillarde, France

Sport
- Sport: Equestrian

Koris Vieules (born 9 October 1970) is a French former equestrian. He competed in the team eventing at the 1996 Summer Olympics.
