= Heyday (horse) =

Thoroughbred horse

- Breed: Thoroughbred
- Sire: Babamist
- Grandsire: Mystic
- Dam: More Mischief
- Maternal grandsire: Idolater
- Sex: Gelding
- Foaled: 1987
- Colour: Bay, star, off fore sock
- Owner: Dr. Elinor Jenny
- Trainer: Bruce Davidson

Olympic medal record

Equestrian
| Silver medal – second place | 1996 Atlanta | Team eventing |

Heyday was a Thoroughbred gelding that competed in the sport of eventing, ridden by American Bruce Davidson. He was one of the Top Ten All American High Point Horses of the Century in eventing. He stands 16 hands (64 inches, 163 cm).

Heyday was very successful at a young age, competing at the advanced level at the age 6. He went on to represent the United States at the Atlanta Olympics in 1996 earning the team silver medal, won the 1995 Pan American Games, came second at the Blenheim Horse Trials in 1997, and won team bronze at the World Championships in Rome. However, Heyday was notorious for his inconsistent show jumping rounds.

Heyday, bred and owned by Dr. Elinor Jenny, was ridden by her granddaughter Maisy Grassie, who took him to her first Advanced Horse Trials.

== Competition Results ==
2003

- 8th Fair Hill International HT Advanced (Maisy Grassie)

2002

- 7th North American Young Riders Championship CCI** (Maisy Grassie)
- 4th Menfelt HT OI (Maisy Grassie)
- 13th Plantation Field HT Advanced (Maisy Grassie)
- 4th Morven Park HT OI (Maisy Grassie)

2001

- 34th Radnor Hunt Int'l Three-day Event CCI** (Maisy Grassie)
- 4th Middleburg H.T. OI (Maisy Grassie)
- 2nd Fair Hill H.T. at Plantation Field OI (Maisy Grassie)
- 5th Seneca Valley PC H.T. OI (Maisy Grassie)
- 17th Fair Hill International H.T. at Fair Hill OI (Maisy Grassie)
- 19th Morven Park H.T. OI (Maisy Grassie)

2000

- 4th Middleburg H.T. OI (Maisy Grassie)
- 1st North American Young Riders Championship CCI* (Maisy Grassie)
- 5th Bromont Three-day Event CCI *** (Maisy Grassie)

1998

- Team Bronze, Individually 21st at the World Equestrian Games in Rome
- 8th Rolex Kentucky Three Day
- 15th Beaulieu North American Classic HT (Advanced)
- 3rd Morven Park Spring HT (Advanced)
- 13th Pine Top Spring H.T. (Advanced)
- 8th Sharpton Winter H.T. AI

1997

- 2nd Blenheim Horse Trials CCI ***
- 9th Gatcomb Park
- 20th Punchestown Three-Day Event CCI ***
- 28th Beaulieu North American Classic H.T. (Advanced)
- 9th Morven Park Spring HT (Advanced)

1996

- Team Silver, 9th Individually at the Atlanta Olympic Games
- 2nd North Georgia International Open Invitational H.T. (Advanced)
- 19th Groton House Farm H.T. II (Advanced)
- 13th Beaulieu North American Classic H.T. (Advanced)
- 11th Morven Park Spring H.T.(Advanced
- 14th Sharpton Winter H.T. OI

1995

- 16th Burghley Three Day Event CCI ****
- 1st Pan American Games ***

1994

- 4th Fair Hill International Three-Day Event CCI ***
- 2nd Morven Park H.T. (Advanced)
- 2nd Bromont Three Day Event HT OI
- 7th Kentucky Three-Day Event CCI ***
- 5th Beaulieu North American Classic H.T. (Advanced)
