= Heinz Wehrli =

Swiss equestrian

Personal information
- Nationality: Swiss
- Born: 24 June 1953 (age 72); Ellikon an der Thur, Switzerland

Sport
- Sport: Equestrian

Heinz Wehrli (born 24 June 1953) is a Swiss former equestrian. He competed in the team eventing at the 1996 Summer Olympics.
