= Gábor Schaller =

Hungarian equestrian

Personal information
- Nationality: Hungarian
- Born: 7 January 1966 (age 59); Budapest, Hungary

Sport
- Sport: Equestrian

Gábor Schaller (born 7 January 1966) is a Hungarian equestrian. He competed in the team eventing at the 1996 Summer Olympics.
