= Pál Tuska =

Hungarian equestrian

Personal information
- Nationality: Hungarian
- Born: 29 January 1957 (age 68); Törökszentmiklós, Hungary

Sport
- Sport: Equestrian

Pál Tuska (born 29 January 1957) is a Hungarian equestrian. He competed in the team eventing at the 1996 Summer Olympics.
