= Wendy Schaeffer =

Australian equestrian (born 1974)

Wendy Schaeffer OAM
Personal information
- Born: 16 September 1974 (age 51) Adelaide, South Australia

Sport
- Country: Australia
- Sport: Equestrian
Medal record
Equestrian
Representing Australia
Olympic Games
Gold medal – first place	1996 Atlanta	Team eventing

Wendy Lynn Schaeffer (born 16 September 1974) is an Australian equestrian and Olympic champion. She is a recipient of the Medal of the Order of Australia, and inductee of the Sport Australia Hall of Fame.

== Career ==
Schaeffer was born in Adelaide, South Australia on 16 September 1974.

Riding the horse Sunburst, she won a team gold medal in eventing for Australia at the 1996 Summer Olympics in Atlanta, along with team members Phillip Dutton, Andrew Hoy and Gillian Rolton. Schaeffer had the best performance (lowest penalty) among all competitors in the team eventing, with no penalties in the show jumping round.

Schaeffer was awarded the Medal of the Order of Australia in 1997, and was inducted into the Sport Australia Hall of Fame in 2002.

The book An Eventful Life – Life Stories of Eventing Champions from 2010, written by Alison Duthie, treats the biography of Wendy Schaeffer and four other Australian Olympic equestrians, Megan Jones, Sonja Johnson, Shane Rose, and Stuart Tinney.
