= Bogusław Owczarek =

Polish equestrian

Personal information
- Full name: Bogusław Adam Owczarek
- Born: 11 July 1965 (age 60); Wolbórz, Poland
- Height: 166 cm (5 ft 5 in)
- Weight: 69 kg (152 lb)

Bogusław Adam Owczarek (born 11 July 1965) is a Polish equestrian. He competed in the team eventing at the 1996 Summer Olympics.
