= Alfie Buller =

Irish equestrian

Personal information
- Nationality: Irish
- Born: 12 August 1957 (age 67)

Sport
- Sport: Equestrian

Alfie Buller (born 12 August 1957) is an Irish equestrian. He competed in the team eventing at the 1996 Summer Olympics.
