= Bruce Davidson (equestrian) =

American equestrian

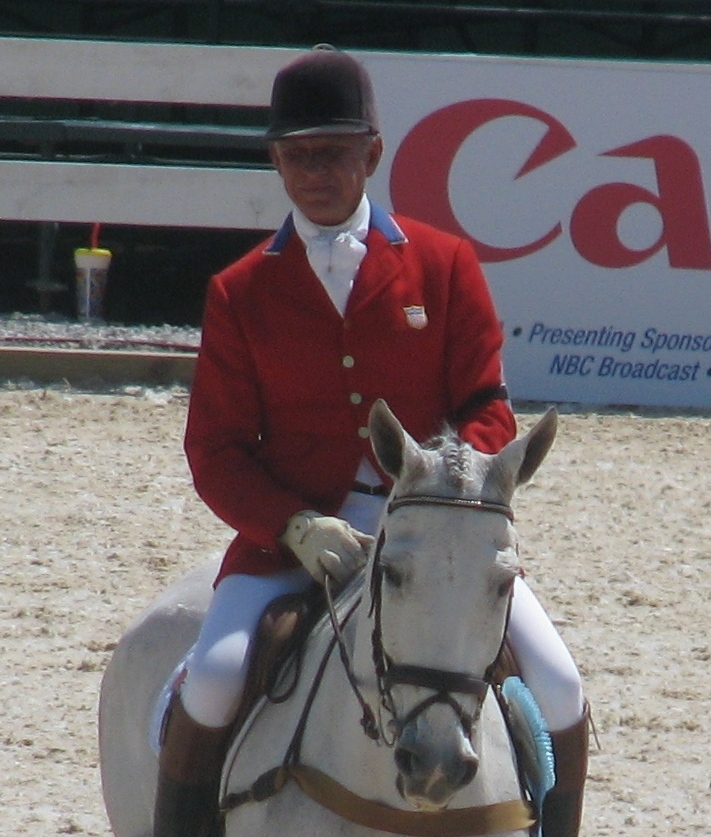
- Davidson and Cruise Lion at the 2009 Rolex Kentucky CCI**** awards ceremony

Personal information
- Full name: Bruce Oram Davidson
- Born: December 31, 1949 (age 76) Rome, New York, U.S.
- Height: 5 ft 11 in (1.80 m)
Medal record
Equestrian
Representing the United States
Olympic Games
Gold medal – first place	1976 Montreal	Team eventing
Gold medal – first place	1984 Los Angeles	Team eventing
Silver medal – second place	1972 Munich	Team eventing
Silver medal – second place	1996 Atlanta	Team eventing
World Championships
Gold medal – first place	1974 Burghley	Team eventing
Gold medal – first place	1974 Burghley	Individual eventing
Gold medal – first place	1978 Lexington	Individual eventing
Bronze medal – third place	1978 Lexington	Team eventing
Bronze medal – third place	1990 Stockholm	Individual eventing
Pan American Games
Gold medal – first place	1975 Mexico City	Team eventing
Gold medal – first place	1995 Mar del Plata	Individual eventing
Silver medal – second place	1975 Mexico City	Individual eventing
Silver medal – second place	1995 Mar del Plata	Team eventing

Bruce Oram Davidson (born December 31, 1949, in Rome, New York) is an American equestrian who competes in the sport of eventing. He grew up in a family uninterested in horses, but began to compete in Pony Club events after a family friend introduced him to riding. He began college at Iowa State University, but left in his third year to train full-time with the United States Equestrian Team. In 1974, he married, and his two children were born in 1976 and 1977. His son, Bruce Davidson Jr., has followed in his footsteps to become a top eventing rider.

At 18, Davidson tried out for the United States eventing team and was accepted. He won his first medal as a member of the silver-medal-winning US team at the 1972 Summer Olympics. After that, Davidson went to win gold at the 1976 and 1984 Olympics and silver in 1996, participating unsuccessfully in 1988. He has also competed repeatedly at both the World Equestrian Games and the Pan American Games, winning medals at both, as well as winning repeatedly at the top-level Badminton Horse Trials and Rolex Kentucky Three Day events. In the 1980s and early 1990s, Davidson was a consistently top-level rider on both the American and international eventing scenes. He is also known for his horse breeding and training abilities.

== Personal life ==
In 1949, Davidson was born to Francis and Annette Davidson, the former a businessman and the latter a concert pianist. He was the third of four children, and had little opportunity to be around horses until his family moved to Westport, Massachusetts, when he was a child. A family friend introduced Davidson to horses, and he began attending Pony Club events. He bought, trained and sold horses until he found a championship horse in Irish Cap, the horse that took him to his first gold medal at the 1974 World Eventing Championship. Davidson went to college at Iowa State University with a veterinary major, but left in his third year to train with the United States Equestrian Team (USET).

In 1974, Davidson married Carol Hannum, a top rider and daughter of Nancy Hannum, who owns extensive property in Pennsylvania surrounding Davidson's Chesterland Farm. In 1976, Davidson's son, Bruce "Buck" Oram Davidson, Jr., was born, followed by a daughter, Nancy Fraser Davidson, in 1977. In 2006, Davidson's first grandson, Oram, was born to Nancy. In 2008, Averell, Nancy's daughter was born. Buck Davidson is also an internationally competitive event rider, competing in high-level events such as the Rolex Kentucky Three Day along with his father.

In 2002, at a competition in Massachusetts, Davidson's horse suffered a fall in a freak accident. The horse, High Scope, broke his neck and died instantly, while Davidson was taken to the intensive care unit at Massachusetts Memorial Hospital. After being treated for injuries, Davidson was released. In 2010, Davidson missed that year's Rolex Three Day Event in Kentucky after undergoing surgery to repair herniated discs in his back.

== Career ==
=== Competition ===
At 18, Davidson participated in a tryout for aspiring eventers run by Neil Ayer and Jack le Goff, who were trying to build the United States team to an international level. He had talent, and according to LeGoff, "He didn't know which diagonal he was posting when he came to me. Two years later, he was riding in the Olympics." Davidson was chosen, and began training with the USET in a four-year, seven-day-a-week program in Gladstone, New Jersey.

Davidson won team eventing medals at Olympic Games in 1972, 1976, 1984 and 1996, and also competed at the 1988 Games. In the 1972 Games, at age 22, he took individual eighth, while the American team won silver. At the 1976 Summer Olympics, the team won gold while Davidson came in tenth individually. In 1984, Davidson, who finished 13th individually, was the lowest scoring member of the gold-medal-winning United States team. At the 1988 Games, Davidson took 18th, while the American team did not finish the competition. In 1996, Davidson did not compete as an individual, but the American team again took silver.

Outside of the Olympics, Davidson also competed repeatedly at the Eventing World Championships and the Pan-American Games. He took both an individual and a team gold at the 1974 World Championships, and another individual gold at the 1978 Championships. Davidson's victory at the 1974 Championships aboard Irish Cap made him the first American ever to win the event, and his win in 1978 aboard Might Tango made him the first rider of any nationality to win back-to-back championships. In this event, the inexperienced Might Tango was Davidson's backup horse after Irish Cap went lame, leading to a scenario which Sports Illustrated likened to "a junior high school quarterback leading USC to victory in the Rose Bowl". Might Tango's inexperience led to increased tiredness and rumors that the activity made him go into shock, but Davidson replied that the horse was just "very tired" and praised him for his stamina. The United States also took a team bronze at the 1978 championships. In 1990, Davidson took an individual bronze at the World Championships in Stockholm, Sweden. In 1998, Davidson competed at the World Equestrian Games in Rome, where he took an individual 21st place, as well as helping the US to a team 4th.

At the 1975 Pan American Games, he took both the individual and the team silver; he followed this up by an individual gold and a team silver at the 1995 Games.

He has also ridden at the Badminton Horse Trials, where he is one of only two Americans to win that event, and he also holds the honor of having the most wins at the Rolex Three Day Event with six victories. Through his 1974 World Championship victory, Davidson is credited with helping to create the Rolex event, as this victory allowed the US to host the 1978 World Championships. The 1978 event turned into an annual competition that eventually became the Rolex Kentucky Three-Day, which was the first and continues to be the only four-star eventing competition in the United States. Davidson has competed at the event almost every year since it began.

In 1993 and 1995, Davidson held the top place in the world eventing rankings compiled by the FEI, and between 1980 and 1995, he was annually named the leading rider for the United States Eventing Association.

=== Other ===
In 2002, Davidson was named as one of the 50 most influential horsemen of the 20th century by the equine magazine The Chronicle of the Horse. In 2009, Davidson was inducted to the United States Eventing Association Hall of Fame, along with his horse Irish Cap. In 2003, another horse ridden by Davidson, Plain Sailing, had also been inducted.

Davidson is also known for his success in finding and training the horses that he rides at the international level. Irish Cap was purchased at the age of five years, JJ Babu and Dr. Peaches as yearlings and Might Tango as a two-year-old ex-racehorse – all ended as championship horses. He is currently a Thoroughbred breeder, and at his Chesterland Farm he says that "the ultimate in the sport is to breed, train and win, to carry the whole system right on through."
