= Vaughn Jefferis =

New Zealand equestrian

Medal record

Equestrian

Representing New Zealand

Olympic Games
| Bronze medal – third place | 1996 Atlanta | Team eventing |

World Championships
| Gold medal – first place | 1994 The Hague | Individual eventing |
| Gold medal – first place | 1998 Rome | Team eventing |

Vaughn Jefferis (born 20 May 1961 in Huntly) is a New Zealand horseman who won a bronze medal at the Olympic Games.

Initially competing in showjumping Jefferis switched to Eventing in 1990 and had immediate success, being part of the gold medal team at the World Equestrian Games in Stockholm riding Enterprise. Jefferis purchased Bounce in 1994 and rode the horse for the remainder of his international career. They won the world individual title in 1994 at The Hague, a bronze medal in the team event at the 1996 Summer Olympics, the team gold at the 1998 World Championships in Rome. Their last event was at the 2000 Summer Olympics in Sydney but they did not complete the event.

== Biography ==
Unlike the majority of his team-mates, such as Mark Todd, Andrew Nicholson and Blyth Tait, who based themselves in England, Jefferis remained in New Zealand throughout his career. After retiring in 2000 he has concentrated on producing and training horses.

In August 2008, Jefferis announced he was making a comeback to top-level eventing, and would aim for the 2012 London Olympics.

In 2019, Jefferis was an inaugural inductee into the Equestrian Sports New Zealand Hall of Fame.
