= Takeaki Tsuchiya =

Japanese equestrian

Personal information
- Nationality: Japanese
- Born: 18 May 1970 (age 54); Miyazaki, Japan

Sport
- Sport: Equestrian

Takeaki Tsuchiya (born 18 May 1970) is a Japanese equestrian. He competed at the 1996 Summer Olympics and the 2000 Summer Olympics.
