= Attila Soós Jr. =

Hungarian equestrian

Personal information
- Nationality: Hungarian
- Born: 27 August 1971 (age 53); Kiskunhalas, Hungary

Sport
- Sport: Equestrian

Attila Soós Jr. (born 27 August 1971) is a Hungarian equestrian. He competed at the 1992 Summer Olympics and the 1996 Summer Olympics.
