= Artur Społowicz =

Polish equestrian

Personal information
- Nationality: Polish
- Born: 11 October 1963 (age 61); Wrocław, Poland

Sport
- Sport: Equestrian

Artur Społowicz (born 11 October 1963) is a Polish equestrian. He competed at the 1996 Summer Olympics and the 2008 Summer Olympics.
