= Lara Villata =

Italian equestrian

Personal information
- Nationality: Italian
- Discipline: Eventing
- Born: 19 April 1967 (age 57); Turin, Italy

Lara Villata (born 19 April 1967) is an Italian equestrian. She competed at the 1992 Summer Olympics, the 1996 Summer Olympics and the 2000 Summer Olympics.
