= Kazuhiro Iwatani =

Japanese equestrian

Personal information
- Nationality: Japanese
- Born: 8 June 1964 (age 60); Kyoto, Japan

Sport
- Sport: Equestrian

Kazuhiro Iwatani (born 8 June 1964) is a Japanese equestrian. He competed at the 1988 Summer Olympics, the 1992 Summer Olympics and the 1996 Summer Olympics.
