= Sidney de Souza (equestrian) =

Brazilian equestrian

Personal information
- Born: 28 July 1973 (age 51); Cornélio Procópio, Brazil

Sport
- Sport: Equestrian

Sidney de Souza (born 28 July 1973) is a Brazilian equestrian.

He competed in the team eventing at the 1996 Summer Olympics.
