= Equestrian events at the 1995 Pan American Games =

Equestrian competitions were contested by participating nations at the 1995 Pan American Games in Mar del Plata, Argentina.

== Events ==
| Event | Gold | Silver | Bronze |
|---|---|---|---|
| Individual dressage | Patrick Burssens; Mexico | Leslie Webb; United States | Victoria Winter; Canada |
| Team dressage | Mexico | United States | Canada |
| Show jumping | Michael Matz; United States | Romandia Jaime Azcarraga; Mexico | Flavier Ximenez; Mexico |
| Team Show jumping | Brazil | Mexico | United States |
| Three-Day event | Bruce Davidson; United States | Federico Castaing; Argentina | André Giovanini; Brazil |
| Team Three-Day event | Brazil | United States | Argentina |

== Medal table ==
| Place | Nation | Gold medal | Silver medal | Bronze medal | Total |
|---|---|---|---|---|---|
| 1 | United States | 2 | 3 | 1 | 6 |
| 2 | Mexico | 2 | 2 | 1 | 5 |
| 3 | Brazil | 2 | 0 | 1 | 3 |
| 4 | Argentina | 0 | 1 | 1 | 1 |
| 5 | Canada | 0 | 0 | 2 | 2 |
| Total | | 6 | 6 | 6 | 18 |

== See also ==
- Equestrian events at the 1996 Summer Olympics
