= Rafał Choynowski =

Polish equestrian

Personal information
- Nationality: Polish
- Born: 23 June 1960 (age 64); Poznań, Poland

Sport
- Sport: Equestrian

Rafał Choynowski (born 23 June 1960) is a Polish equestrian. He competed in the team eventing at the 1996 Summer Olympics.
