= Giacomo Della Chiesa =

Italian equestrian

Personal information
- Nationality: Italian
- Born: 7 February 1962 (age 63); Rome, Italy

Sport
- Sport: Equestrian

Giacomo Della Chiesa (born 7 February 1962) is an Italian equestrian. He competed at the 1996 Summer Olympics and the 2000 Summer Olympics.
