= Bogusław Jarecki =

Polish equestrian

Personal information
- Nationality: Polish
- Born: 21 November 1957 (age 68) Cyców, Poland

Sport
- Sport: Equestrian
Medal record
Equestrian
Representing Poland
Friendship Games
Gold medal – first place	1984 Drzonków	Team eventing

Bogusław Jarecki (born 21 November 1957) is a Polish equestrian. He competed at the 1988 Summer Olympics, the 1992 Summer Olympics and the 1996 Summer Olympics.
