= Stuart Young-Black =

Canadian equestrian

Personal information
- Full name: Stuart Ian Laurent Young-Black
- Nationality: Canadian
- Born: 21 July 1959 (age 67); Macclesfield, England
- Height: 193 cm (6 ft 4 in)
- Weight: 75 kg (165 lb)
Medal record
Equestrian
Representing Canada
Pan American Games
Gold medal – first place	1991 Chatsworth	Team eventing
Silver medal – second place	1987 Indianapolis	Team eventing

Stuart Ian Laurent Young-Black (born 21 July 1959) is a Canadian equestrian. He competed at the 1992 Summer Olympics and the 1996 Summer Olympics.
