= Santiago Centenera =

Spanish equestrian

Personal information
- Nationality: Spanish
- Born: 5 November 1961 (age 63); Madrid, Spain

Sport
- Sport: Equestrian

Santiago Centenera (born 5 November 1961) is a Spanish equestrian. He competed at the 1992 Summer Olympics and the 1996 Summer Olympics.
