= Paula Törnqvist =

Swedish equestrian

Personal information
- Nationality: Swedish
- Born: 24 February 1964 (age 62) Gothenburg, Sweden

Sport
- Sport: Equestrian
Medal record
Equestrian
Representing Sweden
World Championships
Bronze medal – third place	1998 Rome	Individual eventing
European Championships
Silver medal – second place	1997 Burghley	Team eventing
Bronze medal – third place	1999 Luhmühlen	Individual eventing

Paula Törnqvist (born 24 February 1964) is a Swedish equestrian. She competed at the 1996 Summer Olympics and the 2000 Summer Olympics.
