= Kjartan Ólafsson =

Kjartan Ólafsson may refer to

- Kjartan Ólafsson (composer) (born 1958), Icelandic musicologist, composer, and academic
- Kjartan Ólafsson, key historical character in Laxdæla saga
