= Therese Olausson =

Swedish equestrian

Personal information
- Nationality: Swedish
- Born: 13 January 1968 (age 57); Borås, Sweden

Sport
- Sport: Equestrian

Therese Olausson (born 13 January 1968) is a Swedish equestrian. She competed in the team eventing at the 1996 Summer Olympics.
