= Magnús Óláfsson (disambiguation) =

Magnús Óláfsson (died 1265) was King of Mann and the Isles.

Magnús Óláfsson may also refer to:

- Magnus the Good (1024–1047), or Magnus I, King of Norway
- Magnus Barefoot (1073–1103), or Magnus III, King of Norway
- Magnús Ólafsson (swimmer) (born 1967), Icelandic swimmer
- Magnús Ólafsson (actor), Icelandic actor, comedian, singer and former handball player
