= Tibor Herczegfalvy =

Hungarian equestrian

Personal information
- Nationality: Hungarian
- Born: 17 March 1954 (age 71); Mezőhegyes, Hungary

Sport
- Sport: Equestrian

Tibor Herczegfalvy (born 17 March 1954) is a Hungarian equestrian. He competed at the 1992 Summer Olympics and the 1996 Summer Olympics.
