= Ranieri Campello =

Italian equestrian

Personal information
- Nationality: Italian
- Born: 5 October 1962 (age 62); Rome, Italy

Sport
- Sport: Equestrian

Ranieri Campello (born 5 October 1962) is an Italian equestrian. He competed at the 1988 Summer Olympics and the 1996 Summer Olympics.
