= Luciano Drubi =

Brazilian equestrian

Personal information
- Full name: Luciano Miranda Drubi
- Born: 23 November 1966 (age 59) Colina, Brazil

Sport
- Sport: Equestrian
Medal record
Equestrian
Representing Brazil
Pan American Games
Silver medal – second place	1999 Winnipeg	Team eventing

Luciano Miranda Drubi (born 23 November 1966) is a Brazilian equestrian. He competed at the 1992 Summer Olympics and the 1996 Summer Olympics.
