= Virginia McGrath =

Irish equestrian

Personal information
- Nationality: Irish
- Born: 13 March 1965 (age 61) London, England

Sport
- Sport: Equestrian
Medal record
Equestrian
Representing Ireland
European Championships
Bronze medal – third place	1995 Pratoni del Vivaro	Team eventing

Virginia Mary McGrath (née Conolly-Carew; born 13 March 1965) is an Irish equestrian. She competed at the 1996 and 2000 Summer Olympics. She is the daughter of Patrick Conolly-Carew, 7th Baron Carew. She is married to Neil S. McGrath since 1985.
