= Rodolphe Scherer =

French equestrian

Personal information
- Nationality: French
- Born: 11 April 1972 (age 54) Nantes, France

Sport
- Sport: Equestrian
Medal record
Equestrian
Representing France
World Championships
| Silver medal – second place | 1998 Rome | Team eventing |
European Championships
| Silver medal – second place | 1995 Pratoni del Vivaro | Team eventing |
| Silver medal – second place | 2001 Pau | Team eventing |

Rodolphe Scherer (born 11 April 1972) is a French equestrian. He competed at the 1996 Summer Olympics and the 2000 Summer Olympics.
