= Gillian Rolton =

Australian equestrian (1956–2017)

Gillian Rolton AM
- Rolton with Peppermint Grove

Personal information
- Nationality: Australian
- Born: 3 May 1956 Adelaide, South Australia
- Died: 18 November 2017 (aged 61) Adelaide, South Australia
Medal record
Equestrian
Representing Australia
Olympic Games
Gold medal – first place	1992 Barcelona	Team eventing
Gold medal – first place	1996 Atlanta	Team eventing

Gillian Rolton AM (3 May 1956 – 18 November 2017) was an Australian Olympic equestrian champion. She competed in two Olympic Games, the 1992 Barcelona Games and 1996 Atlanta Games, winning a gold medal in team eventing both times on her horse, Peppermint Grove. At the 1996 Atlanta Games, she broke her collarbone and ribs, but remounted and completed the course. She was one of four Australians to win multiple equestrian Olympic gold medals.

== Early life ==
Gillian Rolton was born in Adelaide, South Australia, on 3 May 1956, the daughter of a builder. She had an older brother, John. She was educated at Woodlands Girls Grammar School. She participated in swimming, qualifying for the South Australian sub-junior state team, but the school frowned on individual sports, and she had to give it up. She then took up equestrianism. She got her first horse at the age of ten, and soon began riding competitively, riding a pony at the Royal Adelaide Show in the children's class. She left Woodlands after being told to cut her fingernails in Year 10, and completed her schooling at Marion High School. She continued horse riding, and also enjoyed surfing. After completing Year 12, she entered Sturt College of Advanced Education, where she studied education, with the aim of becoming a teacher.

Rolton enjoyed coaching children in swimming and horse riding, and decided to become a riding instructor. As there was nowhere in Australia offering this qualification at the time, she had to pursue this overseas. Compensation for a motor vehicle accident in which she was thrown through the windscreen provided the money. Before departing, she bought her first event horse, Saville Row, for $200. She deferred her teaching course for a year, and in 1975 made her way via the United States, to Edmonton, Alberta, Canada, where she studied at Grant MacEwan Community College. Classes included equine anatomy, horse management, horse husbandry and stable management, and she learned show jumping, which she had never done before. The course was nominally a two-year one, but in view of her prior experience she was allowed to do it in just one. After three months, she passed the final exam, topping the class with a score of 98 per cent.

== Equestrian ==
After returning to Australia, Rolton rode Saville Row at the 1978 Royal Adelaide Show, taking the prize for Champion Lady Rider. She began competing internationally in 1984, and participated in trials for the Australian team for the 1984 Los Angeles Olympics, but Saville Row was injured, and she missed out. She married Greg Rolton, a fellow rider in September 1985. She competed at the 1986 FEI World Equestrian Games on a new horse, Benton's Way. The Australian team came third. A second attempt at Olympic selection in 1988 was also unsuccessful after Rolton dislocated her elbow before the final selection trial.

In 1987, Rolton bought a horse for $2,000 that she named Peppermint Grove after Peppermint Grove in Western Australia. She retired Benton's Way after winning the 1988 Australian Championships, and began competing on Peppermint Grove. In 1992, she was a last-minute inclusion in the Australian Olympic team, after beating all the male members of the team in the selection trials that were held at Savernake, Wiltshire, England. The Australian team went on to win gold at the 1992 Barcelona Olympics. Rolton was the first Australian female to win an equestrian medal.

Rolton won the Australian championships again in 1995, and was selected for the team at the 1996 Atlanta Olympics. The Australians were on the brink of winning the gold medal when Peppermint Grove skidded during the endurance phase of the event. She remounted, unaware that she had broken her collarbone and ribs, but found herself unable to use her left arm. At the next jump, she fell in the water, but got back on her horse. She now had trouble breathing, as her lung was punctured. Nonetheless, she held on, riding Pepperment Grove over another 15 jumps for an excruciating 3 kilometres (1.9 mi). She was taken to hospital afterwards, but refused painkillers in case she had to ride again the next day. She did not have to, but her ride proved an inspiration to her team, which won gold. She told ABC Television's Australian Story: "You don't go to the Games to be a wuss, you don't go to the Games to be a wimp, you go to the Games because you've got to get through those finish flags no matter what."

== Later life ==
Riding a new and inexperienced horse, Endeavour, Rolton failed to qualify for the 2000 Sydney Olympics, but was chosen as one of the eight flag-bearers of the Olympic flag at the opening ceremony. After the games, Rolton retired from competition, but remained involved with the sport. She opened her own riding school, and between 2001 and 2007 she initiated, co-ordinated and coached the Mitsubishi National Young Rider Squad, that helped talented young eventing riders to make the transition to senior level. She also helped establish the National Interschools Program. She was a national selector until 2007, when she stood down in order to become an International Federation for Equestrian Sports (FEI) judge. She served on the grand jury at the 2012 London Olympics, and was President of the Grand Jury at the 2014 FEI World Equestrian Games.

In 2015, Rolton was diagnosed with endometrial cancer. The doctors subsequently found metastatic cancer in her groin. Chemotherapy failed and she was informed that the disease was terminal. She was admitted to hospital in Adelaide in September 2017, and died in there on 18 November 2017. She was survived by her husband Greg. At the time of her death, she was Event Director of the Australian International Three Day Event held in Adelaide, a position that she had held for ten years. She had continued working on it from her hospital bed.

== Recognition ==
Rolton was awarded the Order of Australia Medal in the 1993 Australia Day honours "for service to sport as a gold medallist in the equestrian three-day event at the Olympic Games".

In 2000, she was inducted into the Sport Australia Hall of Fame.

She was inducted into South Australian Sport Hall of Fame in 2010, and in 2016 was elevated to legend status alongside Sir Donald Bradman, Bart Cummings, Barrie Robran, and Victor Richardson.

She was inducted into the Equestrian Australia Hall of Fame for her service to the sport in 2016.

In 2017, she was granted Adelaide's highest honour with the keys to the city.

In January 2018, she was posthumously made a Member of the Order of Australia "For significant service to horse sports through roles with a range of national and international equestrian organisations".
