= Icelandic folk music =

Icelandic folk music includes a number of styles that are together a prominent part of the music of Iceland. When speaking of traditional Icelandic vocal music, there are two prominent vocal performance styles, one using the term kveða and the other syngja. The first is a performance practice referred to as kveðskapur or kvæðaskapur. Kveðskapur is also the generic Icelandic term for poetry. The term syngja translates as to sing. Kveðskapur was very connected to sagnadansar, or traditional dancing (literally "story dancing"). Vikivaki is the best known of the sagnadansar.

While the prevalence of instrumental music before the 20th century is widely debated, folk instruments include the langspil and fiðla (Icelandic fiddle). Both instruments are in the zither family and are primarily played with a bow. Though very little is known about the fiðla, the langspil is closely related to the pan-European Scheitholt and Appalachian dulcimer.

Traditional Icelandic folk music remained widely performed into the last decades of the 19th century, when folk collecting began in the country. However, the advent of Western classical music and other foreign influences in the same period began leading to a decline in traditional music. Later, the arrival of popular music furthered this change; some folk music was recorded between the World Wars, but intense collecting did not begin in earnest until recently.

== Vikivaki ==
Vikivaki was originally the name of a kind of dance, but the name has since been transferred to a form of Icelandic song designed for people to dance to. Vikivaki poems (Icelandic vikivakakvæði) are characterised by having a refrain that rhymes with the following line. Such poems usually open with an introductory stanza one of whose lines becomes the refrain. New refrains can, however, be brought into the poem. The content of the poems is very varied and can be narrative, descriptive, or dialogic, and secular or religious. According to Margrét Eggertsdóttir, "the precise origin of the vikivaki tradition is unknown, but it has been observed that it shows a relationship to foreign chorus poetry, especially the English carol".

Vikivaki saw a decline at the beginning of the 20th century, although efforts are being made to keep it alive.

== Rímur ==
Rímur are a type of epic vocal poem, with fixed diatonic melodies (except in Breiðafjörður, the district where the traditional music is oldest in style, and folk melodies are variable, not based on fixed scales). Rímur melodies (rímnalög, kvæðalög, stemmur) are often standard, and found throughout the country. These epic poems are written in a narrative style, using elements of Icelandic literature and folklore. The performers were lauded for their ability to tell a story in verse.

A rímur verse is made up of trochaic lines which use literary techniques such as rhyme and alliteration. There are between two and four lines with a pattern of syllabic stress and alliteration. Music author Hreinn Steingrímsson describes rímur this way:

The four-line metres are a combination of two couplets with four stressed syllables in the first line of each, and two such syllables (first and third, second and third, or third and fourth) alliterate with the first stressed syllable of the second line.

The earliest known text of a rímur dates to the 14th century; for the subsequent six hundred years, rímur were the most prolifically produced form of Icelandic literature. Rímur melodies date back to publications by folklorist Ólafur Davíðsson and were then collected in the first Icelandic folk music collection, Íslenzk þjóðlög, by Bjarni Þorsteinsson.

Rímur, especially the short four-line metrical form ferskeytla, is still very popular today in Iceland in most social groups. It is common to compose a ríma (setja saman stöku) about current events usually in the form of a joke or ridicule. These short rhymes tend to proliferate via email. It is also common during parties that a guest may say a ríma that they have learned or composed as a form of a joke, often an insult. Skill at composing rímur is often admired. A common game is to tell the first part (fyrri partur, the first two lines) of a ríma, and for others to complete the third and fourth lines (to botna), each in their own way. The one whose botn is the cleverest wins. This game can become a serious competition (known as kveðast á) when two or more who are particularly skilled at composing rímur come together. It is an informal rule that if one is ridiculed or even insulted with a ríma they must answer back in kind; any other form of answer is invalid. Use of rímur as a form of joke or games is most common in relation to inland travel and sports such as horsemanship but also in relation to cultural/seasonal periods like Þorri as well as in political circles. Many members of parliament pride themselves on being good at composing rímur and using them to ridicule each other, or opposing parties, in a friendly manner.
