= United States Eventing Association =

The United States Eventing Association (USEA) is the organization responsible for organizing, promoting and adjudicating equestrian eventing in the United States. Formerly known as the United States Combined Training Association, the USEA is a 501(c)(3) non-profit organization.

The association has approximately 13,000 members and organizes around 250 competitions annually, which garner almost 44,000 entries. The USEA works in association with the United States Equestrian Team Foundation and United States Equestrian Federation.

== History ==
The USEA was founded as the United States Combined Training Association in 1959, as the governing body for the sport of combined training, more commonly known as eventing, in the United States of America. In 2001 the organization's name was changed to the United States Eventing Association. It was formed to promote the sport of eventing throughout the country, from the beginner novice to the advanced level. It set rules to protect the safety of the competitors, both human and equine, and those requiring the humane treatment of the horses. The USEA is also responsible for organizing clinics and educational opportunities, registering events that met their qualifications, and assisting in training opportunities for the best competitors in the country.

== Areas ==
The USEA is broken down into 10 different regions called Areas. Each Area has its own governing body that is elected by the registered rides and constituents of the area. These governing bodies help to set the show schedules, run the local Adult and Young Rider Programs, and host annual meetings.

Area I • Connecticut, Maine, Massachusetts, New Hampshire, New York, Rhode Island, and Vermont

Area II • New Jersey, Pennsylvania, Maryland, Delaware, Virginia, and North Carolina

Area III • Tennessee, South Carolina, Mississippi, Alabama, Georgia, and Florida

Area IV • Illinois, Iowa, Kansas, Missouri, Minnesota, Nebraska, North Dakota, and Wisconsin

Area V • Arkansas, Louisiana, Oklahoma, and Texas

Area VI • California and Hawaii

Area VII • Oregon, Washington, Idaho, Montana, and Alaska

Area VIII • Indiana, Kentucky, Michigan, Ohio, and West Virginia

Area IX • Colorado, Wyoming, Utah, and South Dakota

Area X • Arizona, New Mexico, and Nevada

== Young Rider Program ==
The USEA encourages riders under 25 years of age to participate in the Young Rider Program. The program seeks to promote a love of the spot as well as true horsemanship and a strong set of values as the riders grow into mature adults. The program is divided into the above areas and each area is run by volunteers. Camps, clinics, and seminars are offered to help train the next generation of the sport.

== USEA'S Eventing Hall of Fame ==
Induction into the United States Eventing Association's Eventing Hall of Fame is the highest honor awarded within the sport of eventing in the United States. Those inducted into the USEA's Eventing Hall of Fame have truly made a difference in the sport of eventing. Inductees have included past Association presidents, volunteers, riders, founding fathers, course designers, officials, organizers, horses, horse owners, and coaches.

== Criticism ==
The USEA has been criticized for a lack of transparency following the deaths in 2019 and 2020 of several riders who were either competing at recognized events or cross country schooling horses for competitions. In other countries, formal inquiries into the deaths of eventing riders have been released to the general public, as in the case of Australian young riders Olivia Inglis and Caitlyn Fischer. In contrast, no formal investigative document pertaining to the deaths of Katharine Morel, or Jeffie Chapin, or Philippa Humphreys has been released on the USEA website as of January 2021.

The USEA, the FEI, and other governing bodies maintain databases of fall related data, but these databases are not released to the membership or general public. The USEA has its database analyzed by the EquiRatings Company. The statistics related to individual horses are unavailable to prospective buyers of a horse wishing to access the horse's safety record as are the ratings of professional riders whom amateurs may hire for instruction: "At this time, only USEA Online Services accounts associated with a horse can view the ERQI. You will need to add yourself as a rider or owner to the horse’s record to make this available to you."

The USEA website as of 2021 includes a link to the FEI Eventing Risk Management Report covering 2008–2019, but does not include yearly reports of the US data alone. In contrast, in the UK, the British Eventing governing body has maintained a safety database since 2001: "In 2001, British Eventing began a database of fall data. The database system was created and is analyzed annually by Transport Research Laboratory (TRL) at Wokingham. TRL has been around for over 70 years and is known for its expertise in motor vehicle safety in which similar database approaches are useful. TRL works on projects ranging from helmets for race car drivers to seat belts for passenger vehicles. The British database holds data including fence, fall, and medical/injury details. Annually, TRL releases a report of the data before the next eventing season begins."

Criticisms of the dangers of the sport in 2020 and 2019 echo concerns from the previous decade over 10 riders were killed competing worldwide between 2007 and 2008.
