= The Chronicle of the Horse =

American equestrian magazine

- Categories: Sports magazine
- Frequency: Monthly
- Founded: 1937
- Country: United States
- Language: English
- Website: www.chronofhorse.com
- ISSN: 0009-5990

The Chronicle of the Horse is an American (once weekly but now 12 times a year ) equestrian magazine. It covers dressage, hunters and jumpers, eventing, fox hunting, and steeplechase racing. It has been described as one of the "most prestigious" and "respected" US magazines about horses.

It was started in 1937 by Stacy Barcroft Lloyd Jr and Gerald Webb.In 1953, it changed from tabloid to magazine size. Its website was created in 1998 and forums in 1999.

In 2013, the Ohrstrom family sold the Chronicle to Mark Bellissimo, owner of the Winter Equestrian Festival. In 2022, Bellissimo sold it to Global Equestrian Group, which also owns several other equine-related businesses. In September 2025 the magazine was sold to GRANDPRIX Group.
