= Platu 25 World Championship =

Dinghy sailing regatta

The Platu 25 World Championship is an annual international sailing regatta for the Platu 25 keelboat, organized by the host club on behalf of the International Class Association and recognized by World Sailing, the sports IOC recognized governing body.

== Events ==
| Ed. | | | Hosts | | | Boats | Sailor | | | | | Ref. |
| No | Day/Month | Year | Host club | City | Country | Boats | No. | Nat. | Cont. | | | Ref. |
|---|---|---|---|---|---|---|---|---|---|---|---|---|
| 1 | 26 Sep - 1 Oct | 2006 | Real Club Naútico de Vigo | Vigo | Spain | 81 | - | 11+ | 2+ | - | - | |
| 2 | 24-31 Aug | 2007 | | Neustadt | Germany | 50 | | | 2 | | | |
| 3 | | 2008 | | Crete | Greece | 27 | | | 2 | | | |
| 4 | | 2009 | Yacht Club Punta Ala | Punta Ala | Italy | 91 | | | | | | |
| 5 | 18-24 Jul | 2010 | Real Club Regatas Alicante | Alicante | Spain | 66 | 340 | 11 | 2 | | | |
| 6 | | 2011 | | Gmunden | Austria | 46 | | | | | | |
| 7 | 23-29 Sep | 2012 | Yacht Club Cala De' Medici | Rosignano | Italy | 50 | | | | | | |
| 8 | 220-28 Sept | 2013 | | Portosín | Spain | 22 | | | | | | |
| 9 | 20-27 Sep | 2014 | Société des Régates d’Antibes | Antibes | France | 35 | | | | | | |
| N/A | 29 Aug -5 Sep | 2015 | Piraeus Sailing Club | Piraeus | Greece | Championships cancelled | | | | | | |
| 10 | 20-27 Aug | 2016 | | Brunnen | Switzerland | 27 | | | | | | |
| 11 | 25-30 Sep | 2017 | Velaclub Palermo | Mondello | Italy | 35 | | | | | | |
| 12 | 11-18 Aug | 2018 | | Riga | Latvia | 37 | | | | | | |
| N/A | 10-15 Sept | 2019 | | Faro | Portugal | Championships cancelled | | | | | | |
| N/A | 15-22 Aug | 2020 | Gero Vėjo Klubas | Nida | Lithuania | Championships postponed due to COVID-19 | | | | | | |
| 13 | 22-28 Aug | 2021 | Gero Vėjo Klubas | Nida | Lithuania | 43 | | | | | | |
| 14 | 24 Sep - 2 Oct | 2022 | | Trani | Italy | | | | | | | |
| N/A | | 2023 | NOT SCHEDULED | | | | | | | | | |
| 15 | 23-29 Sep | 2024 | Nautical Club 78 | Athens | Greece | 18 | | | | | | |
| 16 | 29 Sep -4 Oct | 2025 | SEF STAMURA ASD | Ancona | Italy | 20 | | 5+ | 1+ | | | |
| 17 | 14-19 Sep | 2026 | Circolo Nautico Sambenedettese | | Italy | 18 | | | | | | |

== Medalists ==
| Year | Gold | Silver | Bronze |
|---|---|---|---|
| 2006 (Spain) | ESP-25474; Manuel Weiller (ESP); UNKNOWN; UNKNOWN; UNKNOWN | ITA-25021 - Fra Martina; Lorenzo Bressani (ITA); UNKNOWN; UNKNOWN; UNKNOWN | ESP-25465; Gonzalo Araujo (ESP); UNKNOWN; UNKNOWN; UNKNOWN |
| 2007 (Germany) | GER 25117 - La Revoltosa; Joachim Hellmich (GER); UNKNOWN; UNKNOWN; UNKNOWN | GER 249 - Flexi; Niklas Ganssauge (GER); UNKNOWN; UNKNOWN; UNKNOWN | ESP 25068 - Vilagarcia; Carlos Paz Blanco (ESP); UNKNOWN; UNKNOWN; UNKNOWN |
| 2008 (Greece) | GRE 2520 - Modus Vivendi – 3 Alfa; Panagiotis Mantis (GRE); Kostas Karageorgiou; Vasilis Portosalte; Vaggelis Kappas; Stavros Argyros | GER 249 - Flexi; Niklas Ganssauge (GER); Sven Kruse; Bernhard Krüger; Sonja Krabbe; Thomas Kruse | ESP 25451 - Bribon; Marc De Antonio (ESP); Javi Jaudenes; Matias Bonet; Sofia Bertrand; Lluis Mas |
| 2009 (Italy) | ESP 25068 - Vilagarcia; Antón Paz (ESP); UNKNOWN; UNKNOWN; UNKNOWN | GRE 2520 - Modus Vivendi – 3 Alfa; Panagiotis Mantis (GRE); UNKNOWN; UNKNOWN; UNKNOWN | ESP 25451 - Bribon – Movistar; Jose Cusì (ESP); UNKNOWN; UNKNOWN; UNKNOWN |
| 2010 (Spain) | GRE 2520 - Modus Vivendi – 3 Alfa; Panagiotis Mantis (GRE); Pavlos Kagialis (GRE); Vaggelis Kappas (GRE); Andreas Paleras (GRE); Kostas Karageorgiou (GRE) | ESP 25404 - Carpantxo; J. Pintos (ESP); F. Sanchez; R.Alvarez; J. Figueria; B. Coira | M. Weiller (ESP); F. Pomar; M. Bonet; P. Balaguer; F. Gallastegui |
| 2011 (Austria) | EUZ II Monella Vagabonda; Sandro Montefusco (ITA); Markus Sigrist (SUI); Corrado Capece Minutolo (ITA); Francesco Lanera (ITA); Elisabetta Picca (ITA); Lukas Gerig (SUI) | Mundo Marino; Francisco Sánchez Ferrer (ESP); Roman Illan Garcia; Jesús De Arias Far; Marina Sánchez; Cristina Femenía; Alvaro De Haro | Falkone; Cornelius Heeschen (GER); Falko Knabe; Ole Von Studnitz; Thorben Nowak; Frank Wegener |
| 2012 (Italy) | EUZ II Monella Vagabonda (ITA); Sandro Montefusco; Paolo Montefusco; Corrado Capece Minutolo; Francesco Lanera; Andrea Quartulli | Vilagarcia (ESP); Carlos Paz; Antón Paz; Juan Deben; Joaquin Cores Abuin; Bernardo Paz Docampo | Five for Fighting 3 (ITA); Alberto La Tegola; Tommaso De Bellis Vitti; Diego Romero; Mario Di Rienzo; Mario Rinaldi |
| 2013 (Spain) | Credite EGS (POR); Afonso Domingos; Gil Conde; Nuno Barreto; Filipe Matias; Pedro Patricio | EUZ II Monella Vagabonda (ITA); Sandro Montefusco | E para comer Lugo (ESP); Gonzalo Araújo |
| 2014 (France) | EUZ II Monella Vagabonda (ITA); Francesco Lanera; Sandro Montefusco; Paolo Montefusco; Lorenzo de Felice; Michele Valenti | Five for Fighting 3 (ITA); Tommaso De Bellis Vitti; Nikolaos Mascoli; Michele Regolo; Gabriele Gorgoni; Giulio Desiderato | Superbüsi (SUI); Mathias Bermejo; David Erismann; Marcus Rindlisbacher; Roland Kunz; Nicolas Duchoud |
| 2015 (Greece) | Championships cancelled | | |
| 2016 (Switzerland) | Falkone (SUI); Eric Monnin; Andreas Widmer; Julien Falxa; Clement Salzes; Mathieu Renault | Superbüsi (SUI); Mathias Bermejo; UNKNOWN; UNKNOWN; UNKNOWN | Five for Fighting 3 (ITA); Tommaso De Bellis Vitti; UNKNOWN; UNKNOWN; UNKNOWN |
| 2017 (Italy) | EUZ II Taverna Degli Amici (ITA); Francesco Lanera; UNKNOWN; UNKNOWN; UNKNOWN | Five For Fighting 3 (ITA); Tommaso De Bellis Vitti; UNKNOWN; UNKNOWN; UNKNOWN | Brera Hotels (ITA); Alberto Wolleb; UNKNOWN; UNKNOWN; UNKNOWN |
| 2018 (Latvia) | ITA-243 - EUZ II Taverna Degli Amici; Sandro Montefusco (ITA); Francesco Lanera (ITA); Paolo Montefusco (ITA); Paolo Bucciarelli (ITA); Roberto Santomanco (ITA) | Easy Tiger; Chris Way (AUS); Thomas Spithill (AUS); Stephen McConaghy (AUS); Murray Gordon (AUS); Rachel Bower (AUS) | LAT-990 - Penelope; Mati Sepp (EST); Karl Kolk (EST); Janno Hool (EST); A. Kodar; R. Elnionis |
| 2019 (Portugal) | Championships cancelled | | |
| 2020 (Lithuania) [ | Championships postponed due to COVID-19 | | |
| 2021 (Lithuania) | (Estonia) Penelope; Mati Sepp (EST); Janno Hool; Ago Rebane; Karl Kolk; Rufus Rytovaara | (Italy) EUZ II VILLA SCHINOSA; Francesco Lanera (ITA); Corrado Capace Minutolo; Paolo Montefusco; Roberto Santomanco; Valerio Galati | (Lithuania) White Whale; Raimondas Šiugždinis; Klaudio Kliučinskas; Vaiva Anskaitienė; Rimantas Vilkas; Julius Maseiva |
| 2022 | | | |
| 2023 | NOT SCHEDULED | | |
| 2024 (Greece) | ITA 243 (2) - EUZ II; Francesco Lanera (ITA); UNKNOWN; UNKNOWN; UNKNOWN | ITA 247 (11) - Fandango; Marco Angiolini (ITA) | ITA 403 (14) - Bonaventura; Edoardo Barni (ITA) |
| 2025 | ITA 243 - EUZ II; Francesco Lanera (ITA); UNKNOWN; UNKNOWN; UNKNOWN | ITA 402 - Bonaventura; Lamente Velane | FRA 31004 - Black Flag; Christophe Chaffardon |
| 2026 | Aftershock Mark Griffith (AUS) – Helm / Owner; Stephen McConaghy (AUS) – Tactics; Peter Winter (AUS) – Trim; Garry Stocks (AUS) – Pit; Nathan Masopust (AUS) – Bow | Fandango; Marco Angiolini (ITA) | Keturi Vejai; Radvilas Janulonis (LTU) |
