= Sailing at the 1992 Summer Olympics – Men's 470 =

470 Men's at the Games of the XXV Olympiad
- 470
- Venue: Barcelona
- Dates: 27 July to 3 August
- Competitors: 74 from 37 nations
- Teams: 37

Medalists
1st place, gold medalist(s)		Jordi Calafat; Kiko Sánchez	Spain
2nd place, silver medalist(s)		Morgan Reeser; Kevin Burnham	United States
3rd place, bronze medalist(s)		Tõnu Tõniste; Toomas Tõniste	Estonia

The Men's 470 Class Competition at the 1992 Summer Olympics was held from 27 July to 4 August 1992 in Barcelona, Spain. Points were awarded for placement in each race. The best six out of seven race scores did count for the final placement.

== Results ==
Rank	Helmsman (Country)	Crew	Race I		Race II		Race III		Race IV		Race V		Race VI		Race VII		Total Points	Total -1
Rank	Helmsman (Country)	Crew	Rank	Points	Rank	Points	Rank	Points	Rank	Points	Rank	Points	Rank	Points	Rank	Points	Total Points	Total -1
1	Jordi Calafat (ESP)	Francisco Sanchez	1	0.0	10	16.0	1	0.0	1	0.0	12	18.0	10	16.0	~~32~~	~~38.0~~	88.0	50.0
2	Morgan Reeser (USA)	Kevin Burnham	13	19.0	2	3.0	6	11.7	~~17~~	~~23.0~~	1	0.0	7	13.0	14	20.0	89.7	66.7
3	Tonu Toniste (EST)	Toomas Toniste	10	16.0	11	17.0	7	13.0	4	8.0	6	11.7	~~28~~	~~34.0~~	2	3.0	102.7	68.7
4	Petri Leskinen (FIN)	Mika Aarnikka	2	3.0	12	18.0	14	20.0	2	3.0	8	14.0	~~14~~	~~20.0~~	6	11.7	89.7	69.7
5	Herman Horn Johannessen (NOR)	Pål McCarthy	6	11.7	4	8.0	~~17~~	~~23.0~~	5	10.0	4	8.0	11	17.0	11	17.0	94.7	71.7
6	Paul Brotherton (GBR)	Andrew G. Hemmings	11	17.0	3	5.7	2	3.0	6	11.7	17	23.0	~~DNS~~	~~44.0~~	10	16.0	120.4	76.4
7	Craig Greenwood (NZL)	Jon Bilger	18	24.0	9	15.0	3	5.7	10	16.0	3	5.7	~~PMS~~	~~44.0~~	8	14.0	124.4	80.4
8	Wolfgang Hunger (GER)	Rolf Schmidt	~~PMS~~	~~44.0~~	DNF	44.0	8	14.0	3	5.7	7	13.0	3	5.7	1	0.0	126.4	82.4
9	Shay Bahar (ISR)	Erez Shemesh	3	5.7	14	20.0	10	16.0	14	20.0	~~24~~	~~30.0~~	4	8.0	15	21.0	120.7	90.7
10	Magnus Lundgren (SWE)	Urban Lagnéus	~~31~~	~~37.0~~	7	13.0	12	18.0	20	26.0	16	22.0	5	10.0	4	8.0	134.0	97.0
11	Sandro Montefusco (ITA)	Paolo Montefusco	7	13.0	17	23.0	~~DSQ~~	~~44.0~~	7	13.0	18	24.0	2	3.0	19	25.0	145.0	101.0
12	Shinji Otsu (JPN)	Motohiro Hirobe	8	14.0	5	10.0	4	8.0	15	21.0	28	34.0	~~PMS~~	~~44.0~~	13	19.0	150.0	106.0
13	Eduardo Melchert (BRA)	B. Muller Carioba Arndt	29	35.0	1	0.0	~~32~~	~~38.0~~	18	24.0	27	33.0	6	11.7	7	13.0	154.7	116.7
14	Nigel Cochrane (CAN)	Jeff Eckard	12	18.0	8	14.0	11	17.0	8	14.0	~~33~~	~~39.0~~	17	23.0	28	34.0	159.0	120.0
15	Gyula Nyári (HUN)	Zsolt Nyári	16	22.0	24	30.0	9	15.0	28	34.0	15	21.0	1	0.0	~~29~~	~~35.0~~	157.0	122.0
16	Ben Kouwenhoven (NED)	Jan Kouwenhoven	14	20.0	~~PMS~~	~~44.0~~	25	31.0	9	15.0	19	25.0	30	36.0	3	5.7	176.7	132.7
17	Andreas Kosmatopoulos (GRE)	Thanasis Pakhoumas	21	27.0	28	34.0	5	10.0	12	18.0	9	15.0	~~DSQ~~	~~44.0~~	27	33.0	181.0	137.0
18	Dirk Bellemans (BEL)	Johan Bellemans	9	15.0	6	11.7	21	27.0	29	35.0	~~30~~	~~36.0~~	16	22.0	21	27.0	173.7	137.7
19	Hans Jørgen Riber (DEN)	Jesper Pilegaard	~~26~~	~~32.0~~	25	31.0	23	29.0	23	29.0	10	16.0	18	24.0	5	10.0	171.0	139.0
20	Jodok Wicki (SUI)	Bruno Zeltner	~~27~~	~~33.0~~	21	27.0	16	22.0	19	25.0	13	19.0	19	25.0	16	22.0	173.0	140.0
21	Marek Chocian (POL)	Zdzisław Staniul	17	23.0	15	21.0	15	21.0	24	30.0	20	26.0	~~PMS~~	~~44.0~~	17	23.0	188.0	144.0
22	Yoon Cheul (KOR)	Jeong Seong-an	22	28.0	~~DSQ~~	~~44.0~~	DSQ	44.0	11	17.0	14	20.0	12	18.0	12	18.0	189.0	145.0
23	Farokh Tarapore (IND)	Cyrus Cama	~~PMS~~	~~44.0~~	18	24.0	13	19.0	13	19.0	21	27.0	22	28.0	24	30.0	191.0	147.0
24	Victor Hugo Rocha (POR)	Eduardo Seruca	23	29.0	~~27~~	~~33.0~~	20	26.0	26	32.0	5	10.0	21	27.0	18	24.0	181.0	148.0
25	Maxime Paul (FRA)	Dimitri Deruelle	19	25.0	13	19.0	22	28.0	25	31.0	~~26~~	~~32.0~~	24	30.0	9	15.0	180.0	148.0
26	Christian Binder (AUT)	Markus Piso	4	8.0	20	26.0	24	30.0	~~31~~	~~37.0~~	25	31.0	23	29.0	23	29.0	190.0	153.0
27	David Ramón (AND)	Oscar Ramón	15	21.0	29	35.0	31	37.0	27	33.0	2	3.0	25	31.0	~~35~~	~~41.0~~	201.0	160.0
28	Dmitry Berezkin (EUN)	Yevgeny Burmatnov	5	10.0	22	28.0	29	35.0	16	22.0	29	35.0	~~PMS~~	~~44.0~~	26	32.0	206.0	162.0
29	Mariano Castro (ARG)	Gustavo Warburg	28	34.0	16	22.0	26	32.0	~~33~~	~~39.0~~	22	28.0	9	15.0	25	31.0	201.0	162.0
30	Blythe Walker (BER)	Ray DeSilva	~~PMS~~	~~44.0~~	19	25.0	18	24.0	21	27.0	32	38.0	26	32.0	20	26.0	216.0	172.0
31	Nikolas Epifaniou (CYP)	Petros Elton	~~PMS~~	~~44.0~~	23	29.0	28	34.0	22	28.0	23	29.0	13	19.0	30	36.0	219.0	175.0
32	Raimondas Šiugždinis (LTU)	Valdas Balčiūnas	20	26.0	26	32.0	27	33.0	30	36.0	~~34~~	~~40.0~~	15	21.0	22	28.0	216.0	176.0
33	Andrew Gooding (JAM)	Robert Quinton	30	36.0	33	39.0	19	25.0	~~32~~	~~38.0~~	31	37.0	8	14.0	33	39.0	228.0	189.0
34	Siew Shaw Her (SIN)	Joseph Chan	24	30.0	30	36.0	~~DSQ~~	~~44.0~~	35	41.0	11	17.0	20	26.0	36	42.0	236.0	192.0
35	Martin Lambrecht (RSA)	Alec Lanham-Love	25	31.0	32	38.0	30	36.0	34	40.0	~~35~~	~~41.0~~	27	33.0	31	37.0	256.0	215.0
36	Mamoon Sadiq (PAK)	Javed Rasool	32	38.0	31	37.0	33	39.0	~~36~~	~~42.0~~	36	42.0	29	35.0	34	40.0	273.0	231.0
37	Luvambu Filipe (ANG)	Eliseu Ganda	33	39.0	34	40.0	34	40.0	37	43.0	37	43.0	~~DNS~~	~~44.0~~	37	43.0	292.0	248.0

=== Daily standings ===
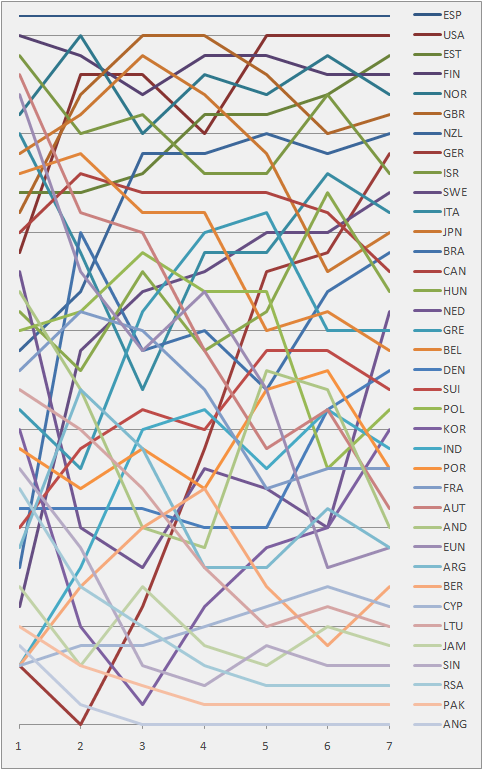
Graph showing the daily standings in the 470 Men's during the 1992 Summer Olympics
