= Angola at the 1992 Summer Olympics =

- IOC code: ANG
- NOC: Angolan Olympic Committee

in Barcelona
- Competitors: 28 in 6 sports
- Medals: Gold 0 Silver 0 Bronze 0 Total 0

Summer Olympics appearances (overview)
- 1980; 1984; 1988; 1992; 1996; 2000; 2004; 2008; 2012; 2016; 2020; 2024

Angola competed at the 1992 Summer Olympics in Barcelona, Spain.

== Competitors ==
The following is the list of number of competitors in the Games.

Sport	Men	Women	Total
Athletics	4	1	5
Basketball	12	0	12
Boxing	1	–	1
Judo	4	0	4
Sailing	3	0	3
Swimming	1	2	3
Total	25	3	28

== Athletics ==
=== Men ===
Track and road events

Athletes	Events	Heat Round 1		Heat Round 2		Semifinal		Final	
Athletes	Events	Time	Rank	Time	Rank	Time	Rank	Time	Rank
Afonso Ferraz	100 metres	11.32	71	Did not advance					
João Francisco Capindica	400 metres	47.44	48	Did not advance					
João N'Tyamba	800 metres	1:48.54	28	N/A		Did not advance			
João N'Tyamba	1500 metres	3:39.54	25	N/A		Did not advance			

Field events

Athlete	Event	Qualification		Final	
Athlete	Event	Result	Rank	Result	Rank
António dos Santos	Triple jump	15.48	40	did not advance	

=== Women ===
Track and road events

Athletes	Events	Heat Round 1		Semifinal		Final	
Athletes	Events	Time	Rank	Time	Rank	Time	Rank
Ana Isabel Elias	1500 m	4:33.66	36	did not advance			
Ana Isabel Elias	3000 m	9:58.82	33	did not advance			

== Basketball ==
=== Men's team competition ===
Preliminary round - Group A

Team	Pld	W	L	PF	PA	PD	Pts
United States	5	5	0	579	350	+229	10
Croatia	5	4	1	423	400	+23	9
Brazil	5	2	3	420	463	-43	7
Germany	5	2	3	369	432	-64	7
Angola	5	1	4	324	392	-68	6
Spain	5	1	4	398	476	-78	6

Classification Matches

Classification 9th-12th

Angola 79-69 China

9th Place Match

Angola 75-78 Spain

Team Roster:

- (4.) Benjamin Romano
- (5.) Anibal Moreira
- (6.) Angelo Victoriano
- (7.) Benjamin Ucuahamba
- (8.) Herlander Coimbra
- (9.) Manuel Sousa
- (10.) Antonio de Carvalho
- (11.) Nelson Sardinha
- (12.) David Dias
- (13.) Paulo Macedo
- (14.) José Guimarães
- (15.) Jean Jacques Conceição

== Boxing ==
Athlete	Event	Round of 32	Round of 16	Quarterfinal	Semifinal	Final
Athlete	Event	Opposition Result	Opposition Result	Opposition Result	Opposition Result	Opposition Result
Francisco Moniz	Welterweight	Scriggins (AUS); L 6-2	Did not advance			

== Judo ==
Men

Athlete	Event	Result
Francisco de Souza	Extra-Lightweight	=23
José Maria de Jesús	Lightweight	=34
João de Souza	Half-Middleweight	=22
Moisés Torres (Note: also competed at the 1988 Summer Olympics)	Half-Heavyweight	=13

== Sailing ==
Men

Athlete	Event	Race							Score	Rank
Athlete	Event	1	2	3	4	5	6	7	Score	Rank
João Neto	Finn	33	33	31	32	(34)	33	33	195	28
Eliseu Ganda; Luvambu Filipe	470	39	40	40	43	43	(44)	43	248	37

== Swimming ==
Men

Athletes	Events	Heat		Finals	
Athletes	Events	Time	Rank	Time	Rank
Pedro Lima	50 metre freestyle	24.14	43	did not advance	
Pedro Lima	100 metre butterfly	58.37	53	did not advance	

Women

Athletes	Events	Heat		Finals	
Athletes	Events	Time	Rank	Time	Rank
Nádia Cruz	100 metre breaststroke	1:21.50	41	did not advance	
Elsa Freire	50 metre freestyle	30.17	50	did not advance	
Elsa Freire	100 metre freestyle	1:05.45	48	did not advance	
Elsa Freire	100 metre butterfly	1:10.17	48	did not advance	
