= Motohiro =

- Gender: Male

Origin
- Origin: Japanese
- Meaning: Different meanings depending on the kanji used

Motohiro (written: 基熈, 基博, 基弘, 基宏, 素弘, 宗弘, 元博, 元浩 or 元裕) is a masculine Japanese given name. Notable people with the name include:

- Motohiro Hata (秦 基博; born 1980), Japanese singer-songwriter
- Motohiro Hirobe (広部 元博; born 1960), Japanese sailor
- Motohiro Katou (加藤 元浩), Japanese manga artist
- Konoe Motohiro (近衛 基熈; 1648–1722), Japanese kugyō
- Nijō Motohiro (二条 基弘; 1859–1928), Japanese noble
- Motohiro Ōno (大野 元裕; born 1963), Japanese politician
- Motohiro Shima (嶋 基宏; born 1984), Japanese baseball player
- Motohiro Yamaguchi (山口 素弘; born 1969), Japanese footballer and manager
- Motohiro Yoshida (吉田 宗弘; born 1974), Japanese footballer
