= Port of Barcelona =

Seaport in Spain

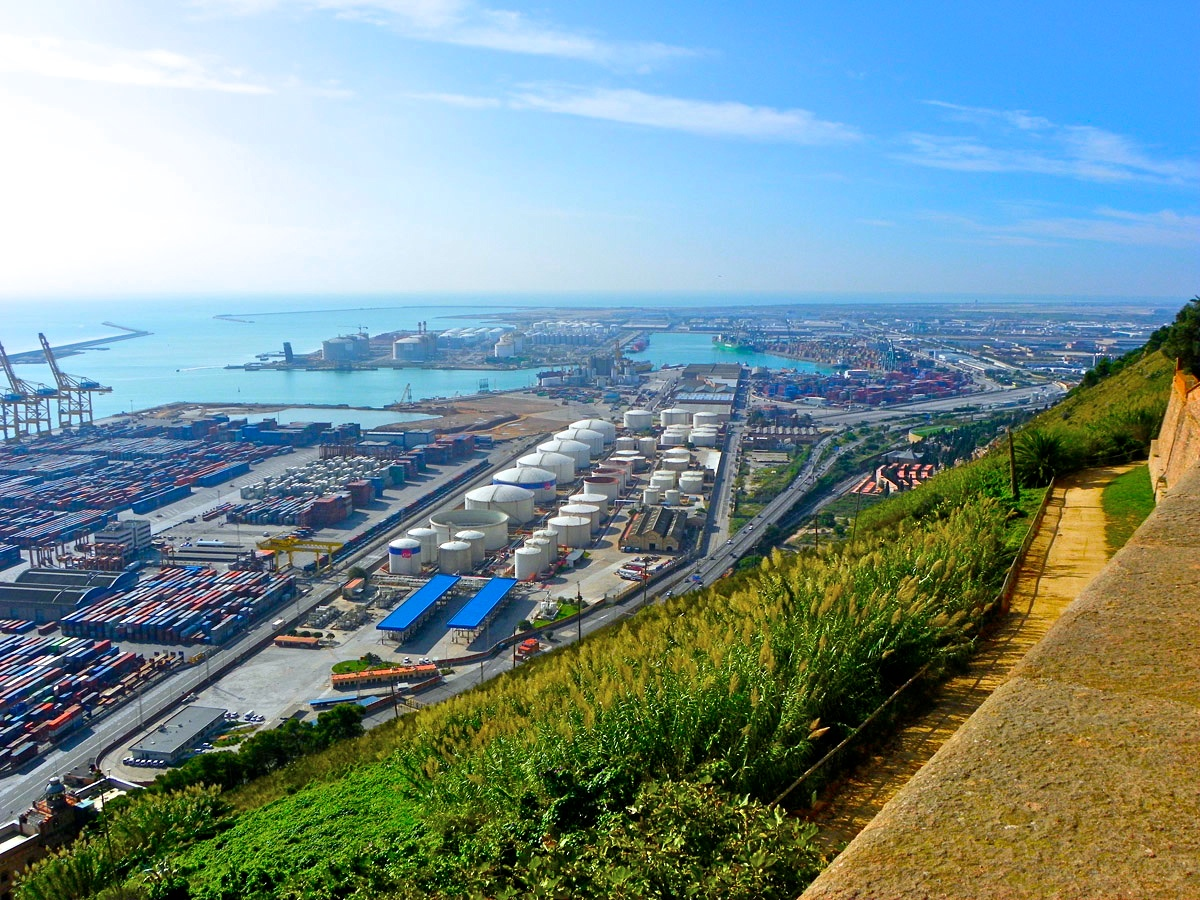
- Interactive map of Port of Barcelona

Location
- Country: Spain
- Location: Barcelona
- Coordinates: 41°20′15″N 2°9′8″E
- UN/LOCODE: ESBCN

Details
- Operated by: Barcelona Port Authority
- Owned by: Ports of the State
- Land area: 10.653 square kilometres (1,065.3 ha)

Statistics
- Vessel arrivals: 9,038 vessels (2018)
- Annual cargo tonnage: 67,756,258 tonnes (2018)
- Annual container volume: 3,422,978 TEUs (2018)
- Passenger traffic: 4,493,646 (2018)

The Port of Barcelona (Catalan: Port de Barcelona, IPA: [ˈpɔɾ ðə βəɾsəˈlonə]; Spanish: Puerto de Barcelona) is a major port in Barcelona, Catalonia, Spain. Its 7.86 km^{2} (3 sq mi) are divided into three zones: Port Vell (the Old Port), the commercial/industrial port, and the logistics port (Barcelona Free Port). The port is managed by the Port Authority of Barcelona, itself owned by the state-owned Ports of the State.

It is the third largest container port in the country and the ninth largest in Europe, with a trade volume of 3.42 million TEUs in 2018. It is also the second cruiser port by passengers in the Mediterranean after Rome's Port of Civitavecchia.

The city has two additional yacht harbors/marinas: Port Olímpic and Port Fòrum Sant Adrià to the north.

== Overview ==
The Port Vell area comprises two marinas or yacht harbors, a fishing port, a maritime station for ferries travelling to the Balearic Islands and other destinations in the Mediterranean and other stations or landing areas cruise ships, and it abuts the industrial port.

In the central area, it also houses "Maremagnum" (a shopping mall and nightlife complex), a multiplex cinema, the IMAX Port Vell (large-format cinema complex), and Europe's largest aquarium, containing 8,000 fish and 11 sharks in 22 basins filled with 6 million litres of sea water. Because it is located in a designated tourist zone, the Maremagnum is the only commercial mall in the city that can open on Sundays and public holidays. Next to the Maremagnum area are the "Golondrines", small ships that take tourists for a visit around the port area and beyond.

The Barcelona industrial port is to the south and comprises the Zona Franca, a tariff-free industrial park that has developed within the Port of Barcelona, across the flat land of the Llobregat Delta between the city of Barcelona and that of El Prat de Llobregat and the Barcelona International Airport to the south.

The industrial port also hosts the Port of Barcelona Heliport (LEPB).

A good place to view both the industrial and pleasure port is from Montjuïc, and more specifically, from Montjuïc Castle, as well as from the aerial cable car connecting Barceloneta with the Ferry Station and Montjuïc.

== Information ==
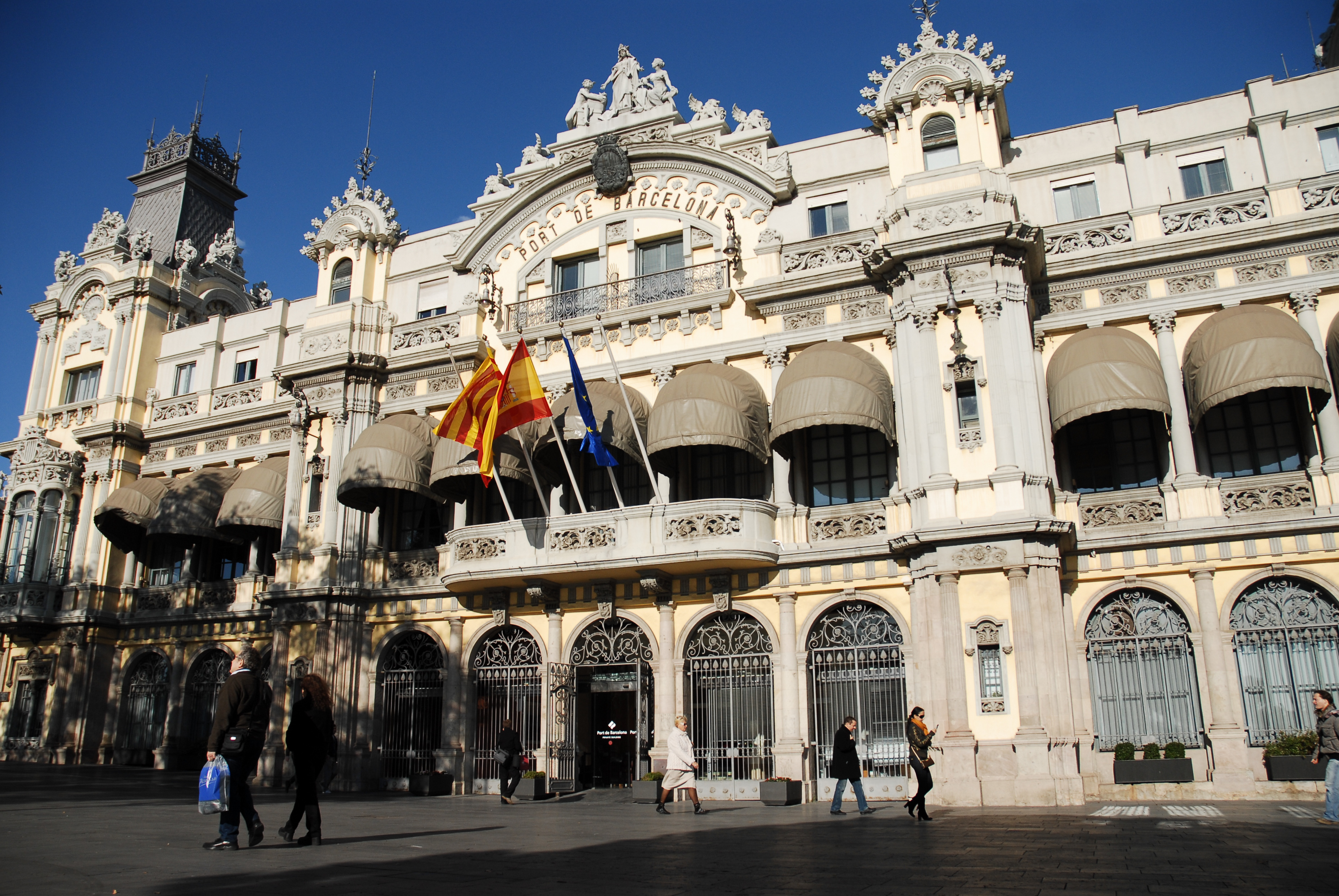
Front view of the central building of the Port of Barcelona. Barcelona, Catalonia, Spain

In common with much of Western Europe, the older traditional industries in Spain, such as textiles, declined in the face of foreign competition. The surviving companies closed their factories in the city or along the rivers, leaving industrial wastelands or abandoned workers' colonies. In many cases within Spain, these industries moved to the Zona Franca (Catalan: Polígon Industrial de la Zona Franca).

The free trade zone is located within the port area, not far away from downtown Barcelona, and is easy to access. It is 5 kilometres (3.1 mi) away from the Barcelona International Airport and connected via highway and railway.

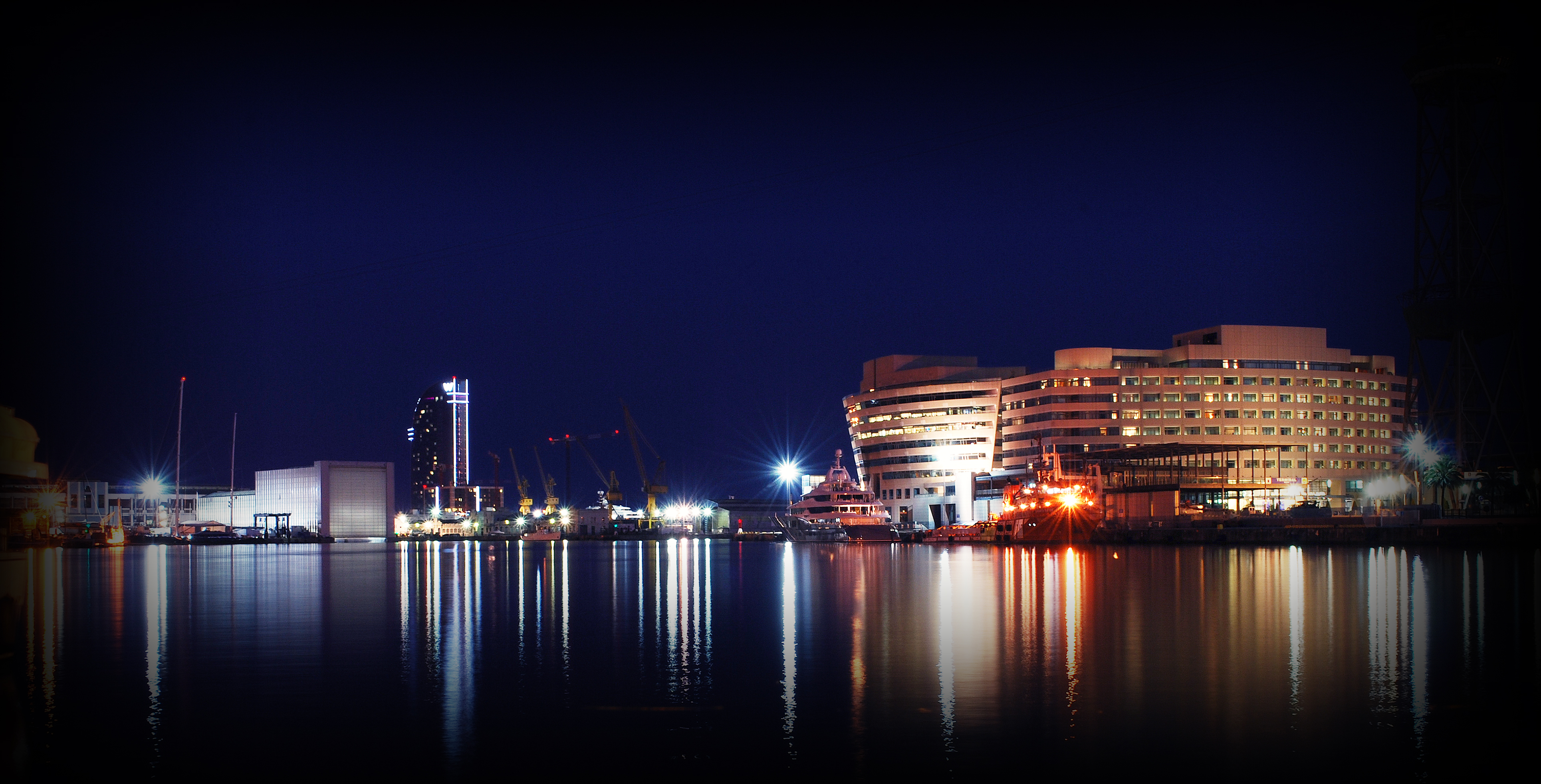
Port of Barcelona at Night

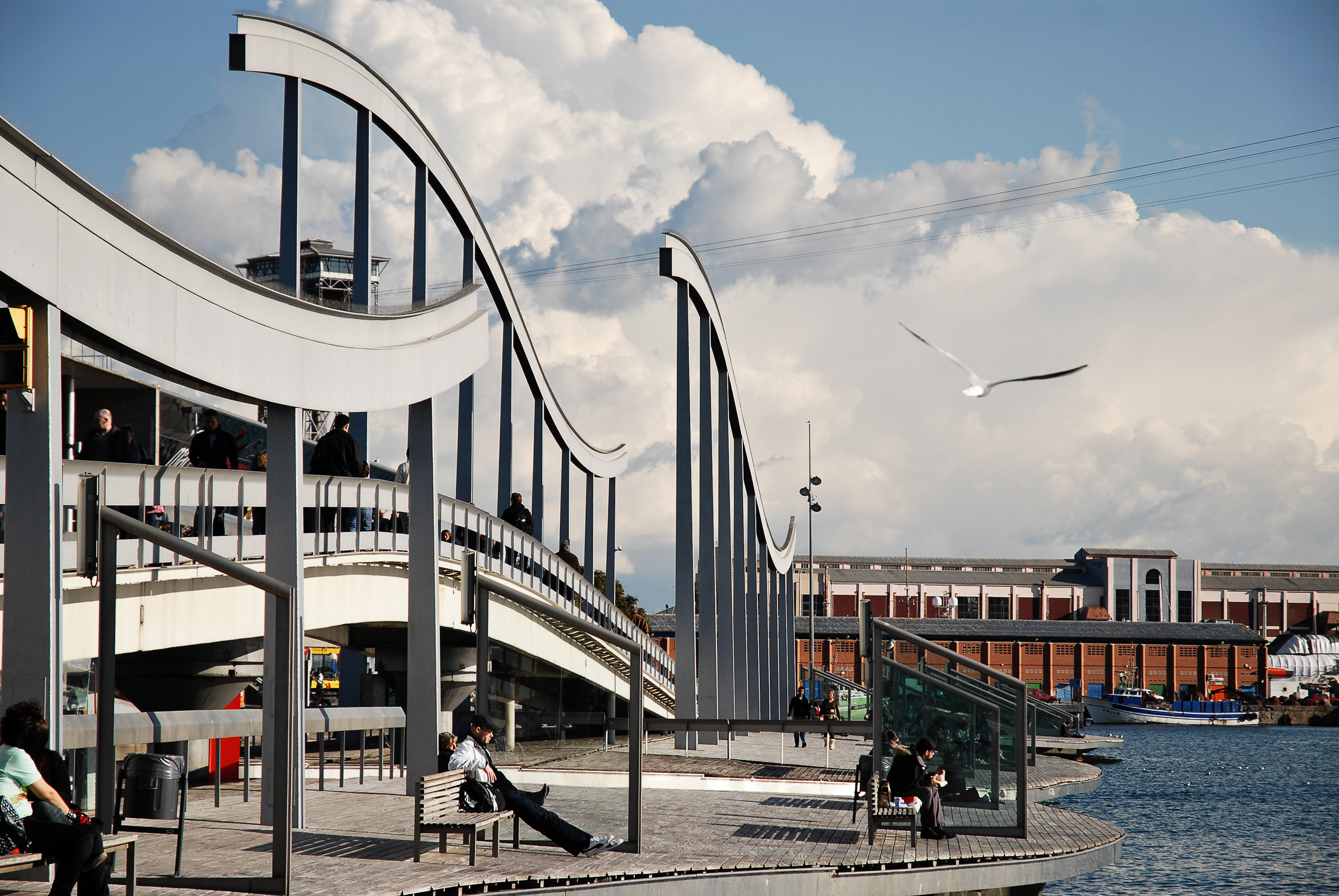
View of the quay near Barcelona Cruise Port Terminal. Barcelona, Catalonia, Spain

Business investors here rent offices or bonded warehouses. They can also elect to purchase land to erect their own buildings.

The free trade zone offers a series of services. It is divided into a comprehensive service area, truck/lorry area, reception area, and sports facilities area. It has a customs duties service, bonded warehousing service, advanced telecommunication and computer system, security system, combined multiple transport system, and so on.

On 17 January 1977, a landing craft being used as a liberty boat by USS Trenton (LPD-14) and USS Guam (LPH-9), was run over by a freighter. The Mike8 boat capsized and came to rest against the fleet landing pier. Crew-members from both vessels were on hand to assist with rescue operations. There were over one hundred sailors and marines on board the landing craft. 49 sailors and marines were killed. A memorial is erected at the landing pier in memory.

== History ==
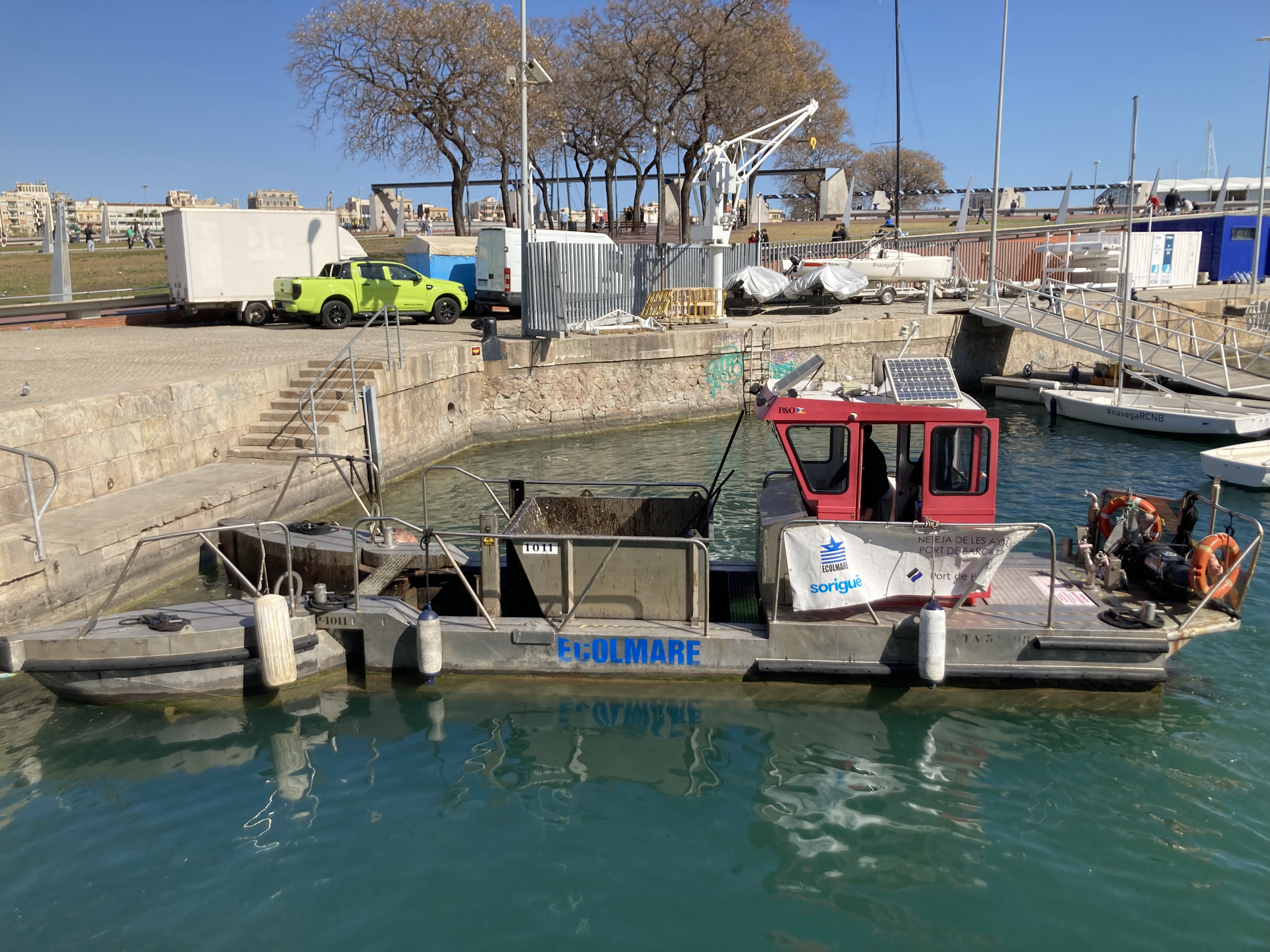
Debris skimmer boat in the Port of Barcelona

In 1978, the Ministry of Public Works declared Bilbao, Huelva and Valencia and Barcelona autonomous ports. It became then known as the Autonomous Port of Barcelona (Catalan: Port Autònom de Barcelona, Spanish: Puerto Autónomo de Barcelona) and while remaining a government body, it was able to function as a commercial enterprise subject to private law.

Opening the Bosch i Alsina wharf in Port Vell (also known as the Moll de la Fusta) to the public in 1981 marked the start to transform the Northern part of the port. This gained much momentum with the decision in 1986 that Barcelona would host the 1992 Summer Olympics. In the subsequent years, the run-down area of empty warehouses, railroad yards, and factories was converted to an attractive harborfront area in a huge urban renewal project. Also neighbouring Barceloneta and its beaches have been transformed to open the city up to the sea. During the Olympics the port hosted up to 11 cruise ships that served as floating hotels.

In November 1992, the central body Ports of the State (Spanish: Puertos del Estado) was created by the Spanish government which brought the end to the Autonomous Port of Barcelona. Since then the port is operated by Barcelona Port Authority (Spanish: Autoridad Portuaria de Barcelona, Catalan: Autoritat Portuària de Barcelona, APB).

The Logistics Activity Zone (Catalan: Zona d'Activitats Logístiques, Spanish: Zona de Actividades Logísticas, ZAL) is a multimodal transport centre that was set up in 1993 with an initial area of 68 hectares in the first phase. The second phase then saw an extension of 143 hectares into El Prat de Llobregat.

In July 1999, the World Trade Center was opened.

Between 2001 and 2008 the port underwent an enlargement that doubled its size by diverting the mouth of the Llobregat River 2 km (1.2 mi) to the south and slightly pushing back the Llobregat Delta Nature Reserve.

== Passenger ferries ==
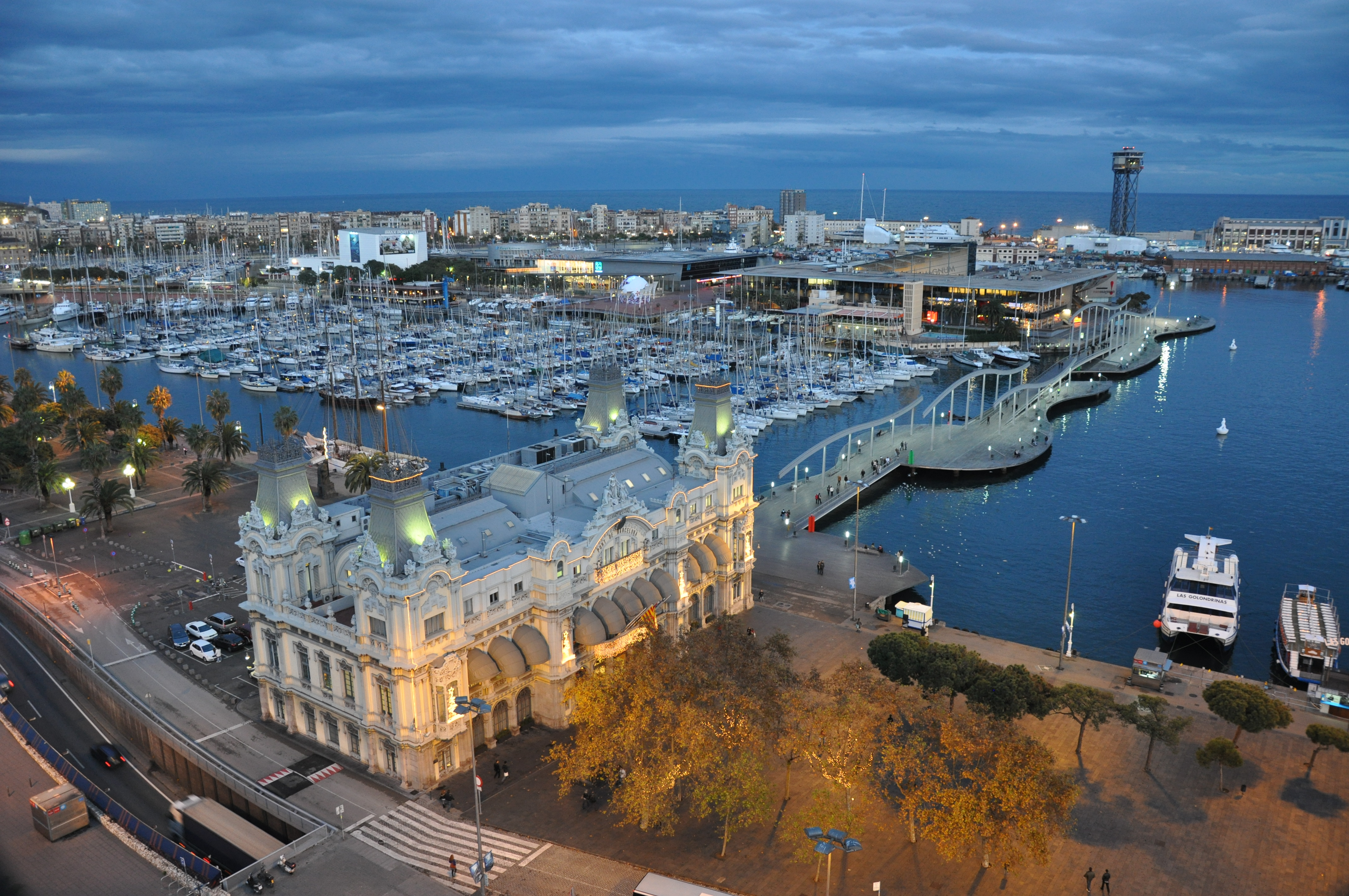
Port Vell as viewed from the Columbus Monument

The three passenger terminals Terminal Drassanes, Terminal Ferry Barcelona and Grimaldi Terminal Barcelona are located in Port Vell. While Baleària and Trasmediterránea operate connections to the Balearic Islands, the companies Grimaldi Lines and Grandi Navi Veloci serve destinations in Italy and Morocco.

Destination	Terminal	Travel time	Ferry operator
(Spain) Alcúdia, Mallorca	Terminal Drassanes	6h	Baleària
(Spain) Palma, Mallorca	Terminal Port-Nou	8h	Baleària
(Spain) Palma, Mallorca	Terminal Ferry Barcelona	8h	Trasmediterránea
(Spain) Ibiza	Terminal Port-Nou	9h	Baleària
(Spain) Ibiza	Terminal Ferry Barcelona	9h	Trasmediterránea
(Spain) Mahón, Menorca	Terminal Ferry Barcelona	9h	Trasmediterránea
(Spain) Ciutadella, Menorca	Terminal Drassanes	9h	Baleària
(Italy) Porto Torres	Grimaldi Terminal Barcelona	12h 15m	Grimaldi Lines
(Italy) Savona	Grimaldi Terminal Barcelona	17h	Grimaldi Lines
(Italy) Civitavecchia	Grimaldi Terminal Barcelona	20h	Grimaldi Lines
(Italy) Genoa	Terminal Ferry Barcelona	20h 30m	Grandi Navi Veloci
(Morocco) Tangier	Grimaldi Terminal Barcelona	28h	Grimaldi Lines
(Morocco) Nador	Terminal Ferry Barcelona	28h 45m	Grandi Navi Veloci
(Morocco) Tangier	Terminal Ferry Barcelona	31h	Grandi Navi Veloci

== Accidents and incidents ==
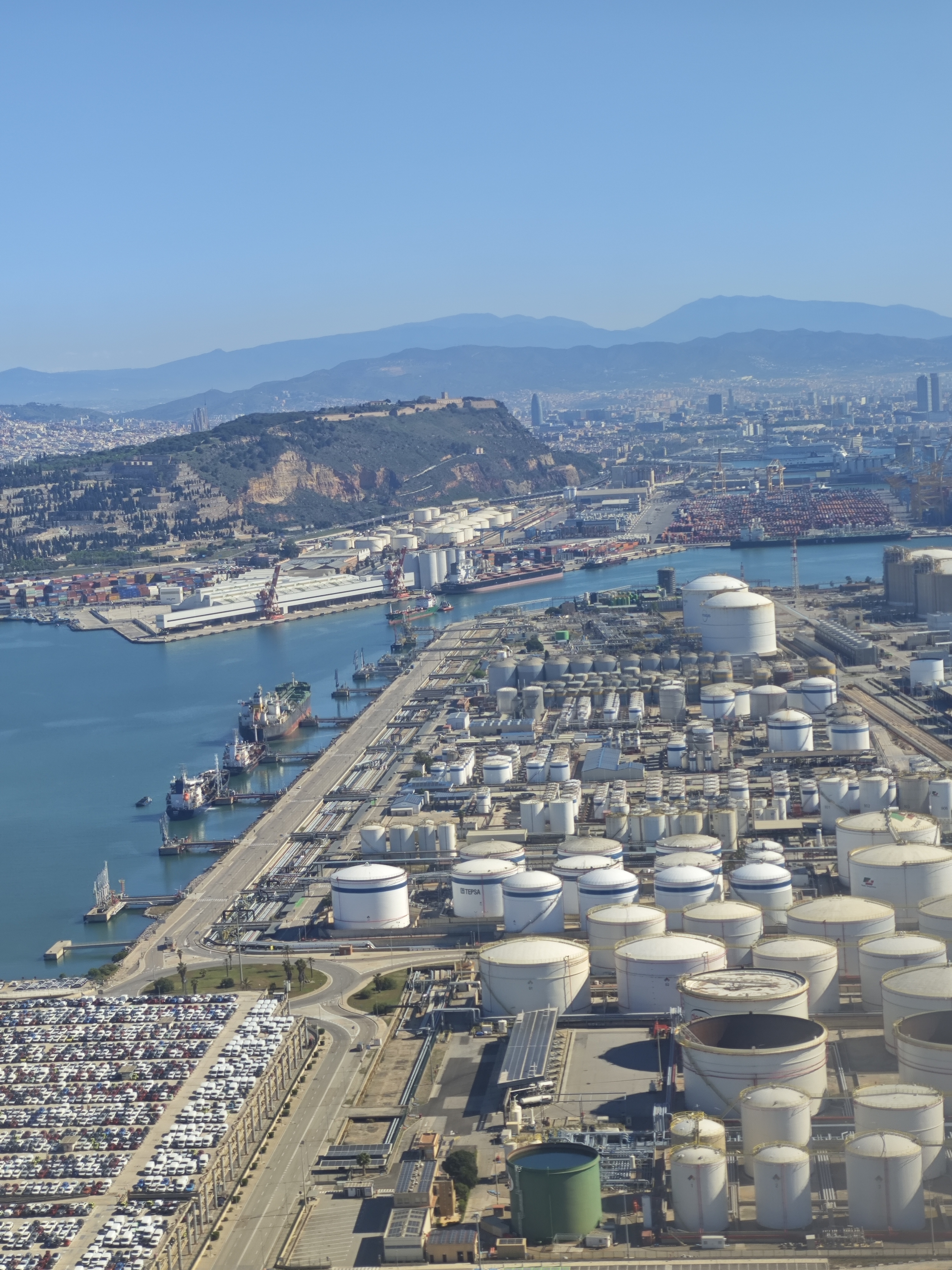
Port of Barcelona

- On 31 October 2018, a 8:00am local time, the Grandi Navi Veloci (GNV) line ferry Excellent crashed into the Port of Barcelona after a gust of wind drove it into the cargo pier, smashing into a gantry crane, which tipped over onto containers holding flammable chemicals, which caught fire, causing toxic smoke, and setting the pier ablaze. The Excellent had been trying to dock, but was prevented from doing so due to bad weather.

== See also ==
- Port Olímpic
- Zona Franca – Port
- List of ports in Spain
- List of busiest ports in Europe
- Royal Barcelona Yacht Club
- Barcelona Royal Shipyard
- Barcelona power station
