= El Prat =

El Prat is the name of the following places:

- The town El Prat de Llobregat
- Josep Tarradellas Barcelona–El Prat Airport, located near the town
