= Johan Bellemans =

Belgian physician

Johan Bellemans is a Belgian former Olympic sailor and physician who became known for the announcement of "discovery" of the anterolateral ligament, already discovered by French doctor Paul Segond in 1879 . He discovered it along with Steven Claes in 2013, after a 134-year period of study for a missing part.

In 2002 he also discovered the reason for limited flexion that is frequently noted after knee replacement surgery, and the concept of posterior condylar offset was originated by him.

In 2014 he introduced the theory of constitutional alignment, which fundamentally changed modern thinking in knee surgery.

He also was influential in the development of the fourth generation artificial knees, and developed the bicruciate stabilised Journey Knee system.

Currently he works as an orthopedic surgeon in a regional hospital in Genk, Belgium after his highly mediatized resigning in both Katholieke Universiteit Leuven and UZ Leuven.

In 1992 he represented Belgium at the 1992 Summer Olympics. Together with his brother Dirk Bellemans he participated in the 470 competition, and ended in 18th position.
