= Shai Bachar =

Israeli sailor

Personal information
- Native name: שי בכר
- Born: September 27, 1969 (age 55); Israel

Sport
- Country: Israel
- Sport: Sailing
- Event: 470

Shai Bachar (Hebrew: שי בכר; also "Shay"; born October 27, 1969) is an Israeli Olympic competitive sailor.

== Sailing career ==
Bachar competed for Israel at the 1992 Summer Olympics in Olympic Port, Barcelona, at the age of 22 in Sailing--Men's Two Person Dinghy (470 event) with partner Erez Shemesh. They finished in 9th place out of 37 competitors.

In 1993 at the 470 World Championships, Bachar and Shemesh won the bronze medal. Bachar and a different partner also won the bronze medal at the 1993 European Championships.

In 1995, Bachar and Shemesh finished in 17th place at the 470 World Championships.
