= Erez Shemesh =

Israeli sailor (born 1970)

Personal information
- Native name: ארז שמש
- Born: October 23, 1970 (age 56) Israel

Sport
- Country: Israel
- Sport: Sailing
- Event: 470

Erez Shemesh (Hebrew: ארז שמש; born October 23, 1970) is an Israeli Olympic competitive sailor. Shemesh was born in Israel and is Jewish.

== Sailing career ==
Shemesh competed for Israel at the 1992 Summer Olympics in Olympic Port, Barcelona, at the age of 22 in Sailing--Men's Two Person Dinghy (470 event) with partner Shai Bachar. They finished in 9th place out of 37 competitors.

In 1993 at the 470 World Championships, Shemesh and Bachar won the bronze medal.

In 1995, Shemesh and Bachar finished in 17th place at the 470 World Championships.
