= Hirobe =

Hirobe (written: 廣部 or 広部) is a Japanese surname. Notable people with the surname include:

- Motohiro Hirobe (広部 元博, born 1960), Japanese sailor
- Yoshiteru Hirobe (廣部 好輝, born 1982), Japanese badminton player
