= Robert Quinton =

Jamaican sailor

Personal information
- Nationality: Jamaican
- Born: 15 May 1963 (age 61)

Sport
- Sport: Sailing

Robert Quinton (born 15 May 1963) is a Jamaican sailor. He competed in the men's 470 event at the 1992 Summer Olympics.
