= Markus Piso =

Austrian sailor

Personal information
- Nationality: Austrian
- Born: 16 July 1966 (age 59) Vienna, Austria

Sport
- Sport: Sailing

Markus Piso (born 16 July 1966) is an Austrian sailor. He competed in the men's 470 event at the 1992 Summer Olympics.
