= Valdas Balčiūnas =

Lithuanian sailor (born 1969)

Personal information
- Nationality: Lithuanian
- Born: 12 January 1969 (age 57) Kaunas, Lithuanian SSR, Soviet Union

Sport
- Sport: Sailing

Valdas Balčiūnas (born 12 January 1969) is a Lithuanian sailor. He competed in the men's 470 event at the 1992 Summer Olympics.
