= Sandro Montefusco =

Italian yacht racer

Personal information
- Nationality: Italian
- Born: 2 December 1958 (age 67) Carmiano, Italy
- Height: 183 cm (6 ft 0 in)
- Weight: 72 kg (159 lb)

Sailing career
- Sport: Sailing
- Class(es): 470, Tornado, J/24, Platu 25, Melges 24, Farr 30, Melges 20
Medal record
Men's Sailing
Representing Italy
Platu 25 World Championships
Gold medal – first place	2011 Gmunden	Platu 25
Gold medal – first place	2012 Rosignano	Platu 25
Gold medal – first place	2014 Antibes	Platu 25
Gold medal – first place	2018 Riga	Platu 25
Silver medal – second place	2013 Portosin	Platu 25
470 World Championships
Silver medal – second place	1988 Haifa	470
Mediterranean Games
Gold medal – first place	1983 Casablanca	470
Gold medal – first place	1991 Athens	470

Sandro Montefusco (born 2 December 1958) is an Italian yacht racer who competed in the men's 470 class at the 1988 Summer Olympics and the 1992 Summer Olympics.
