= Anterolateral ligament =

Ligament on the lateral aspect of the human knee

- From: Lateral epicondyle of the femur
- To: Anterolateral aspect of the proximal tibia

The anterolateral ligament (ALL) is a ligament on the lateral aspect of the human knee, anterior to the fibular collateral ligament.

Perhaps the earliest account of the ALL was written by French surgeon Paul Segond in 1879, in which he described a ligamentous structure between the lateral femur and tibia.

Claes and Bellemans (2013) found that the ALL originates at the lateral epicondyle of the femur, and inserts at the anterolateral aspect of the proximal tibia. However, Vincent et al. (2012) reported the origin to be the lateral femoral condyle.

== Clinical relevance ==
The ALL, which has been suggested to occur in 33-97% of the human population, seems to stabilize medial rotation of the knee. However, the anterior cruciate ligament is the most important contributor to rotatory knee stability. It is uncertain if an isolated anterolateral ligament injury with an intact anterior cruciate ligament injury leads to knee instability. This topic is being hotly debated and researched. The "pivot shift" phenomenon in anterior cruciate ligament injury patients may be ascribed to additional trauma to the ALL or other structures in the anterolateral knee.

The Segond fracture is probably an avulsion of the anterolateral ligament. In such injuries, fragments of the lateral tibial condyle of the knee are torn from the bone by the soft tissue structures of the anterolateral knee.

The ALL can be visualised in most patients on MRI with its attachments to the lateral meniscus body and further tibial insertion on the coronal sequences.
