= Alec Lanham-Love =

South African sailor

Personal information
- Full name: Alec Gordon Hugh Lanham-Love
- Nationality: South African
- Born: 5 June 1961 (age 63)

Sailing career
- Class(es): 49er, Fireball, 470
- Club: Royal Natal Yacht Club

Alec Gordon Hugh Lanham-Love (born 5 June 1961) is a South African sailor. He competed in the men's 470 event at the 1992 Summer Olympics.
