= Port of Barcelona Heliport =

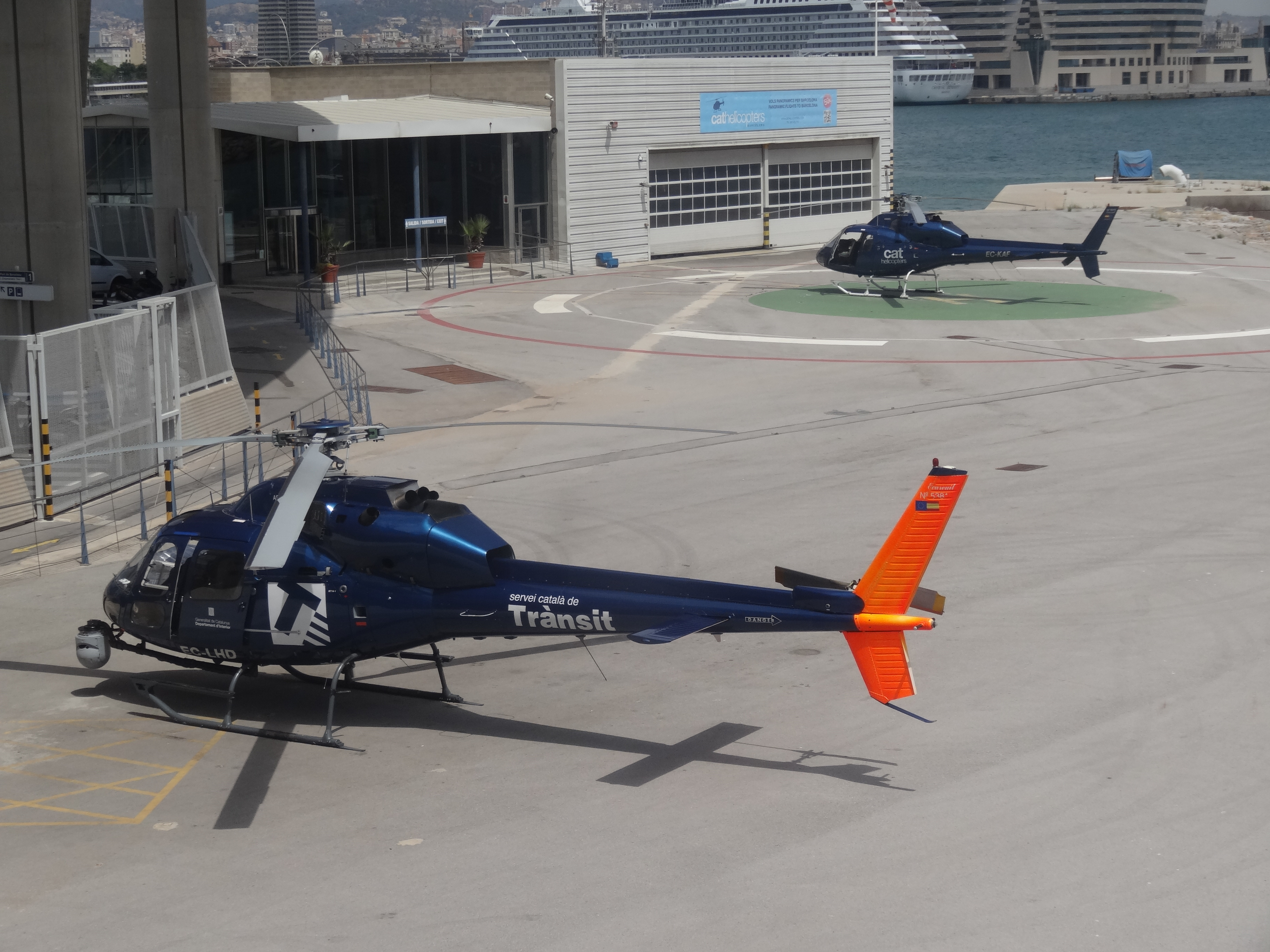
- IATA: none; ICAO: LEPB

Summary
- Airport type: Public
- Owner: Barcelona Port Authority
- Operator: Sistemas Aéreos Especializados, S.L.
- Serves: Barcelona
- Location: Port of Barcelona
- Opened: July 14, 2004
- Coordinates: 41.364308°N 2.183011°E
- Interactive map of Port of Barcelona Heliport

The Port of Barcelona Heliport (ICAO: LEPB) is a public heliport located in Barcelona, Spain. The heliport is located inside the Port of Barcelona (specifically, at Moll Adossat), and therefore owned by the Barcelona Port Authority. However operations management is delegated to a private company.

The heliport has a small size, with 2 hangars and 1 touchdown and lift-off area. It is the base for the tourism company Skytour Bcn and the Catalan Traffic Service.
