= Mariano Castro =

Argentine sailor (born 1964)

Personal information
- Nationality: Argentine
- Born: 26 May 1964 (age 61)

Sport
- Sport: Sailing

Mariano Castro (born 26 May 1964) is an Argentine sailor. He competed in the men's 470 event at the 1992 Summer Olympics.
