= Martin Lambrecht =

South African sailor

Personal information
- Nationality: South African
- Born: 8 February 1967 (age 58)

Sport
- Sport: Sailing

Martin Lambrecht (born 8 February 1967) is a South African sailor. He competed in the men's 470 event at the 1992 Summer Olympics.
