= Ray DeSilva =

Bermudian sailor

Personal information
- Nationality: Bermudian
- Born: 3 February 1967 (age 58)

Sport
- Sport: Sailing

Ray DeSilva (born 3 February 1967) is a Bermudian sailor. He competed in the men's 470 event at the 1992 Summer Olympics.
