= Eduardo Seruca =

Portuguese sailor

Personal information
- Nationality: Portuguese
- Born: 4 February 1967 (age 58)

Sport
- Sport: Sailing

Eduardo Seruca (born 4 February 1967) is a Portuguese sailor. He competed in the men's 470 event at the 1992 Summer Olympics.
