= Craig Greenwood =

New Zealand sailor

Personal information
- Nationality: New Zealand
- Born: 1 March 1963 (age 62); Auckland, New Zealand

Sport
- Sport: Sailing

Craig Greenwood (born 1 March 1963) is a New Zealand sailor. He competed in the men's 470 event at the 1992 Summer Olympics.
