= RS280 =

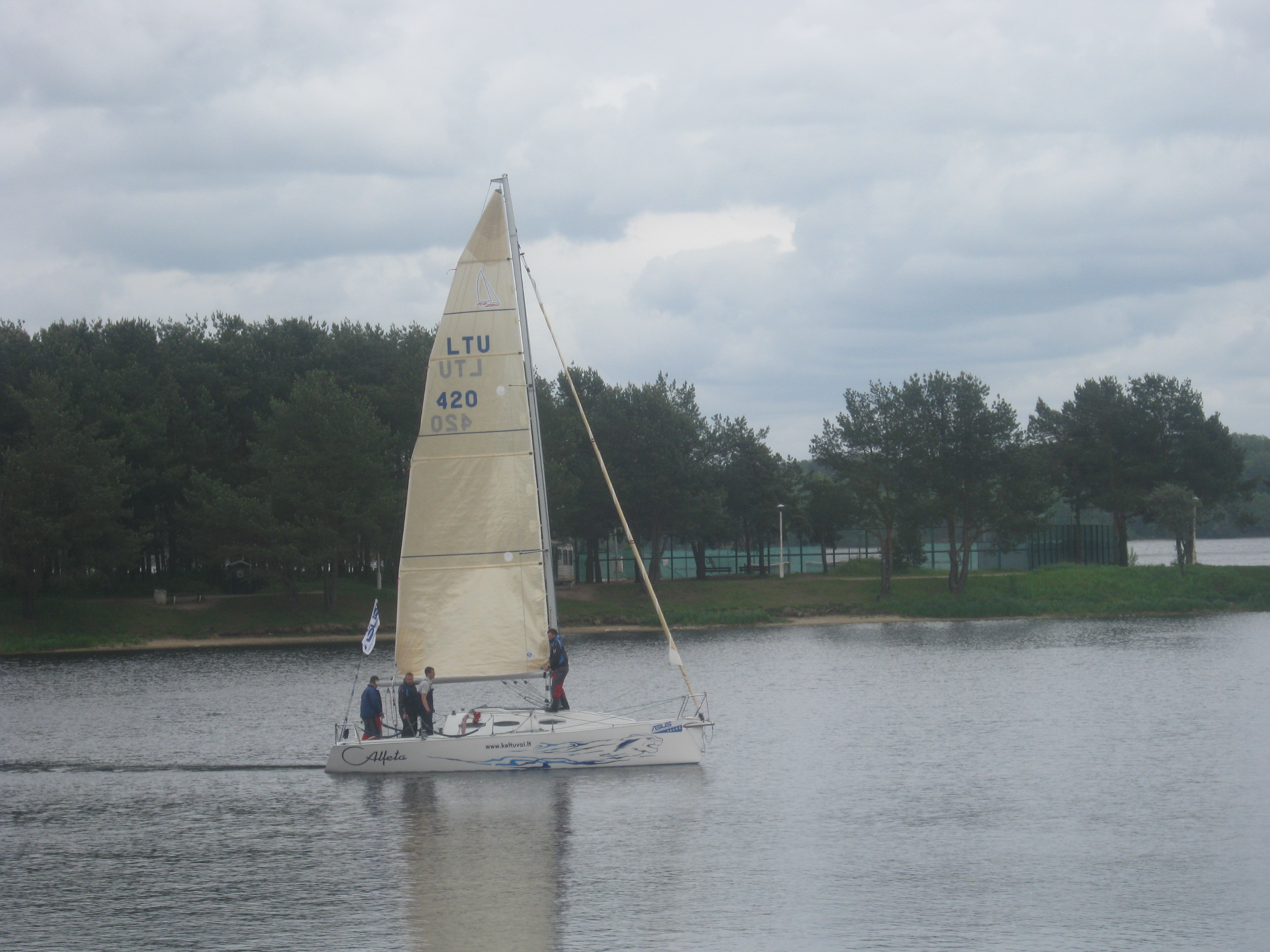
RS-280 during Lithuanian Cup Stage 2

RS-280 is a 5-6 crew sports sailing yacht created and made in Kaunas, Lithuania. Founders of class are Raimondas Šiugždinis and Saulius Pajarskas. It is the fastest and the most maneuverable yacht class created in Lithuania.

== Specifications ==
- Length: 8,30 m
- Weight: 1800 kg
- Width: 2,74 m
- Crew: 5-6
- Speed: 11 knots
