= Shinji Otsu =

Japanese sailor

Personal information
- Nationality: Japanese
- Born: 13 February 1961 (age 64)

Sport
- Sport: Sailing

Shinji Otsu (大津 真二, Ōtsu Shinji, born 13 February 1961) is a Japanese sailor. He competed in the men's 470 event at the 1992 Summer Olympics.
