= Llobregat Delta =

Delta of the Llobregat river

Natural Areas of the Llobregat Delta
- Espais Naturals del Delta del Llobregat (in Catalan)
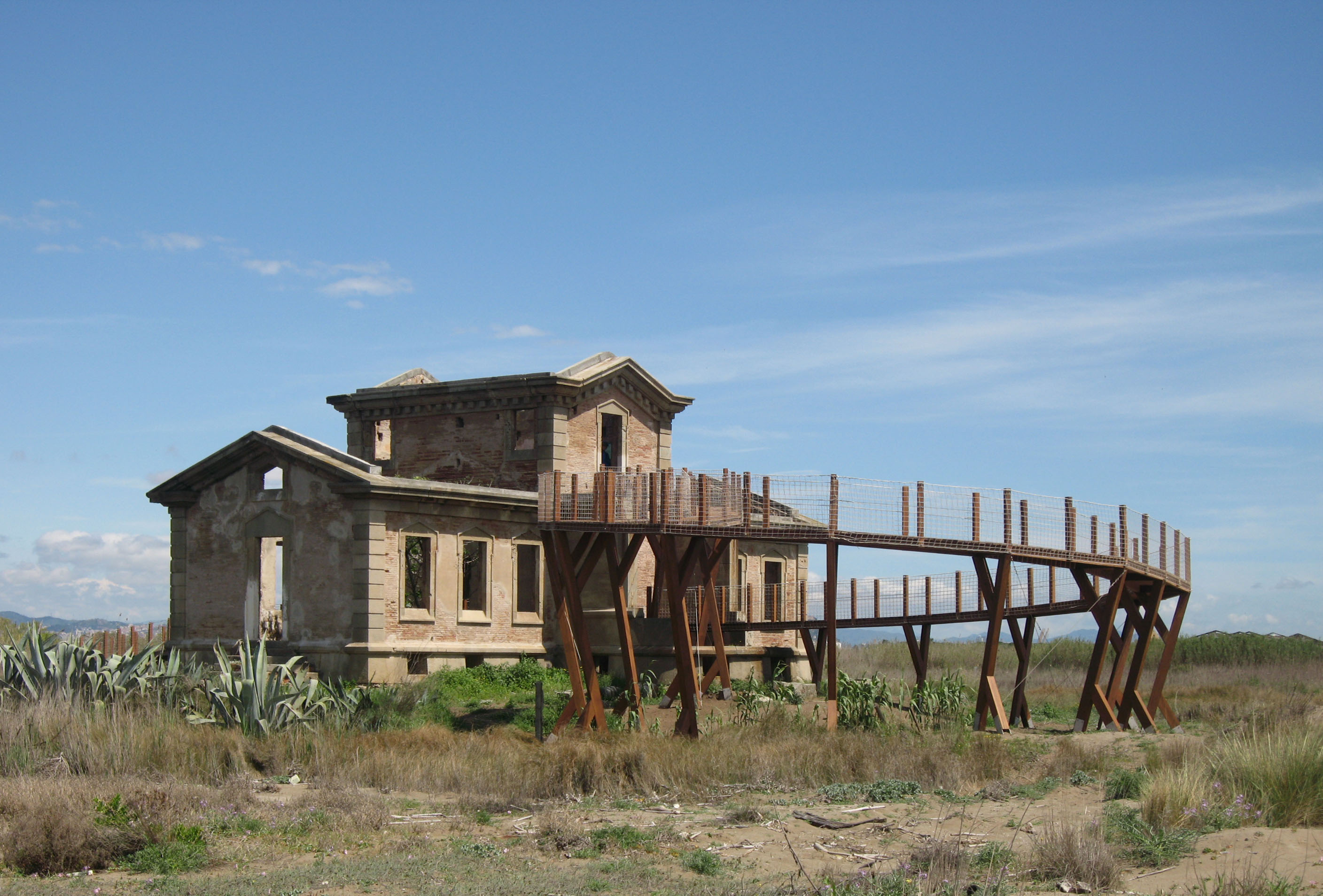
- A bird hide for birdwatching

- Location within Catalonia
- Location: Province of Barcelona, Catalonia, Spain
- Coordinates: 41°18′10″N 2°7′55″E
- Area: 923 ha (2,280 acres)
- Governing body: Generalitat de Catalunya
- Website: www.deltallobregat.cat?lang=en

The Llobregat Delta (Catalan: Delta del Llobregat) is the delta of the Llobregat river, located near the city of Barcelona, Catalonia, northeastern Spain. The current delta has been altered by farming, urban development, industrialisation and transport infrastructures such as the Port of Barcelona and the Barcelona El Prat Airport.

== The Natural Areas of the Llobregat Delta ==
The Natural Areas of the Llobregat Delta (Catalan: Espais Naturals del Delta del Llobregat) is a network of protected areas established in 1987 that belongs to the municipalities of El Prat de Llobregat, Viladecans, Gavà and Sant Boi de Llobregat. It encompasses more than 900 hectares over the eastern bank of the river that have been declared a Special Protection Area as a designation under the European Union Directive on the Conservation of Wild Birds.
