= Pål McCarthy =

Norwegian sailor

Personal information
- Nationality: Norwegian
- Born: 24 January 1966 (age 59); Kristiansand, Norway

Sport
- Sport: Sailing

Pål McCarthy (born 24 January 1966) is a Norwegian sailor. He competed in the men's 470 event at the 1992 Summer Olympics.
