= Magnus Lundgren =

Swedish sailor (born 1964)

Personal information
- Nationality: Swedish
- Born: 19 August 1964 (age 61) Lysekil, Sweden

Sport
- Sport: Sailing

Magnus Lundgren (born 19 August 1964) is a Swedish sailor. He competed in the men's 470 event at the 1992 Summer Olympics.
