= Bruno Zeltner =

Swiss sailor

Personal information
- Nationality: Swiss
- Born: 19 May 1967 (age 57)

Sport
- Sport: Sailing

Bruno Zeltner (born 19 May 1967) is a Swiss sailor. He competed in the men's 470 event at the 1992 Summer Olympics.
