= Dirk Bellemans =

Belgian sailor (born 1966)

Personal information
- Nationality: Belgian
- Born: 22 February 1966 (age 59); Vilvoorde, Belgium

Sport
- Sport: Sailing

Dirk Bellemans (born 22 February 1966) is a Belgian former sailor. He competed in the men's 470 event at the 1992 Summer Olympics.
