= 2021 Platu 25 World Championship =

2021 World Championships
- Venue: Port of Nida
- Location: Nida, Lithuania
- Dates: 22–28 August 2021
- Competitors: 167

The 2021 Platu 25 World Championships were held from 22 to 28 August 2021 in Nida, Lithuania.

This was the first sailing world championships approved by World Sailing held in Lithuania.

== Medal summary ==
Event	Gold	Silver	Bronze
Open	(Estonia) Penelope; Mati Sepp; Janno Hool; Ago Rebane; Karl Kolk; Rufus Rytovaara	(Italy) EUZ II VILLA SCHINOSA; Francesco Lanera; Corrado Capace Minutolo; Paolo Montefusco; Roberto Santomanco; Valerio Galati	(Lithuania) White Whale; Raimondas Šiugždinis; Klaudio Kliučinskas; Vaiva Anskaitienė; Rimantas Vilkas; Julius Maseiva

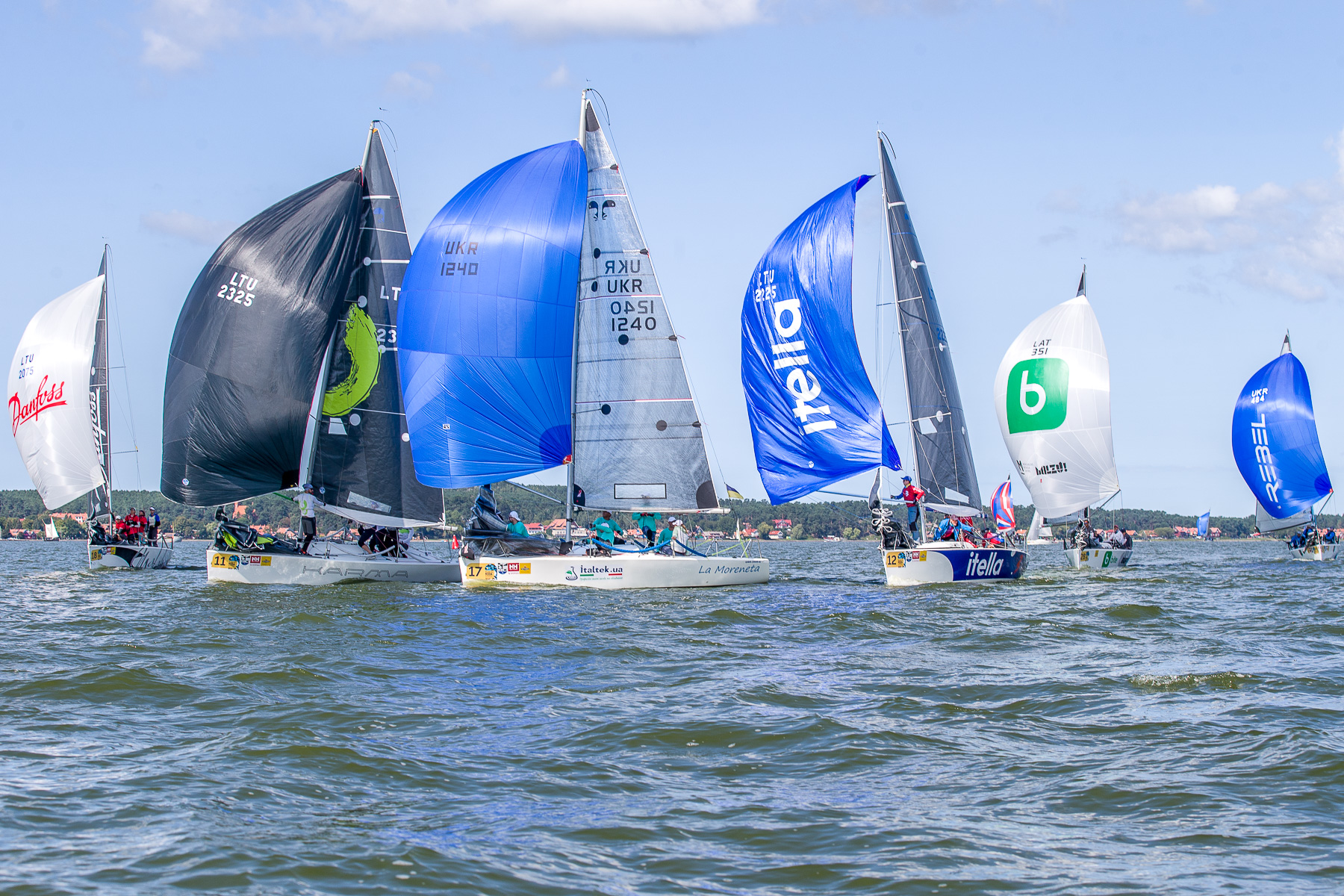
Competition

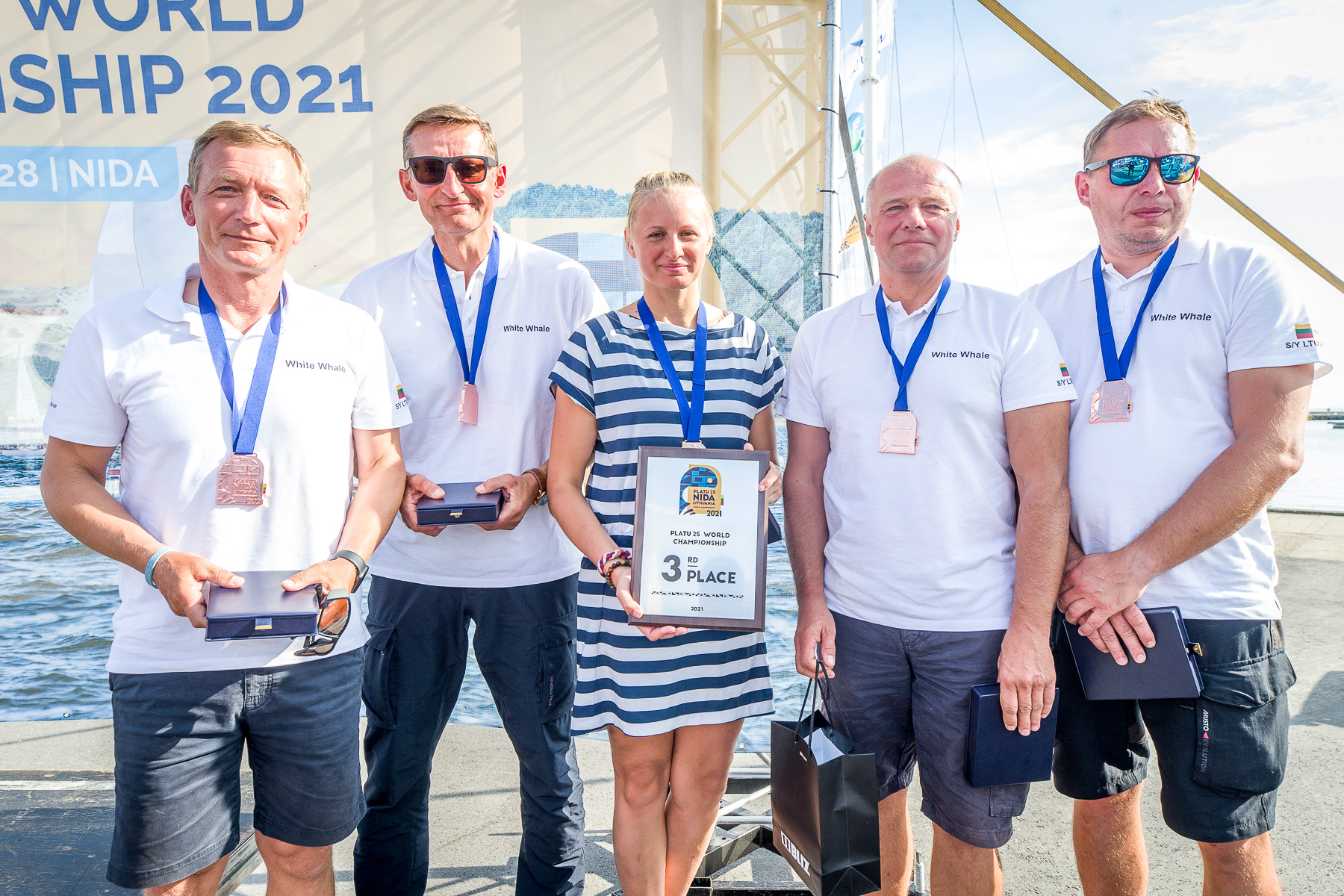
Team White Whale - bronze medal winners

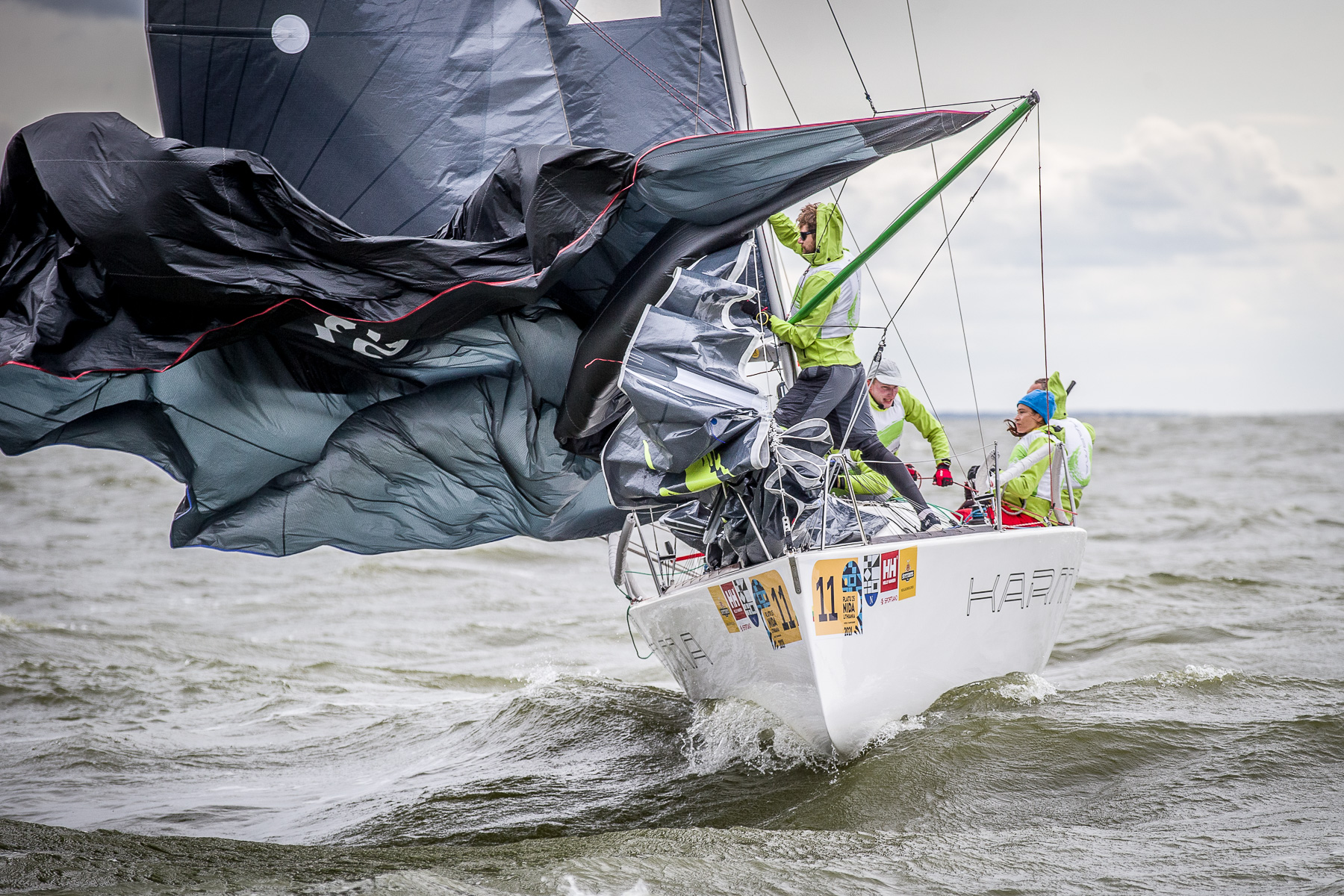
Competition

== Winners of individual stages ==
Stage	Date	Winning boat	Country	Skipper
1	24 August	White Whale	Lithuania	Raimondas Šiugždinis
2	24 August	Penelope	Estonia	Mati Sepp
3	24 August	EUZ II Villa Schinosa	Italy	Francesco Lanera
4	25 August	Penelope	Estonia	Mati Sepp
5	25 August	White Whale	Lithuania	Raimondas Šiugždinis
6	25 August	Bestija	Lithuania	Algirdas Žižys
7	27 August	Penelope	Estonia	Mati Sepp
8	27 August	Grande Evento	Ukraine	Maksym Hontar
9	27 August	Penelope	Estonia	Mati Sepp
10	27 August	Penelope	Estonia	Mati Sepp

== Incidents ==
- 24 August: (Lithuania) Tadas Žižys (boat Pandora) protested against (Ukraine) Ivan Kolobov (boat La Moreneta). Protest dismissed.
- 25 August: due strong winds multiple boats got damaged while in a race: few boats damaged their sails, Lithuanian boat Matahambre dismasted, Latvian boat RA Evolution lost rudder.
- 26 August: due weak wind competition was cancelled for the day. Four races planned for next day.
- 27 August: (Lithuania) Tomas Jurgelevičius (boat Hegelmann) protested against (Latvia) Andrejs Buls (boat Bailarina). Protest upheld and Bailarina crew disqualified from race 9.
- 28 August: due weak wind competition was cancelled for the final day.
