= Paolo Montefusco =

Italian yacht racer

Personal information
- Born: 15 March 1961 (age 65) Carmiano, Italy
- Height: 167 cm (5 ft 6 in)
- Weight: 68 kg (150 lb)

Sailing career
- Sport: Sailing
- Class(es): Platu 25, 470
Medal record
Men's Sailing
Representing Italy
World Championships
Gold medal – first place	2012 Rosignano	Platu 25
Gold medal – first place	2014 Antibes	Platu 25
Gold medal – first place	2018 Riga	Platu 25
Silver medal – second place	1988 Haifa	470
Silver medal – second place	2013 Portosin	Platu 25
Silver medal – second place	2021 Nida	Platu 25

Paolo Montefusco (born 15 March 1961) is an Italian yacht racer who competed in the 1988 Summer Olympics and in the 1992 Summer Olympics.
