= Eliseu Ganda =

Angolan sailor

Personal information
- Nationality: Angolan
- Born: 7 September 1968 (age 57)

Sport
- Sport: Sailing

Eliseu Ganda (born 7 September 1968) is an Angolan sailor. He competed in the men's 470 event at the 1992 Summer Olympics.
