= Luvambu Filipe =

Angolan sailor

Personal information
- Nationality: Angolan
- Born: 3 June 1969 (age 55)

Sport
- Sport: Sailing

Luvambu Filipe (born 3 June 1969) is an Angolan sailor. He competed in the men's 470 event at the 1992 Summer Olympics.
