= El Prat de Llobregat =

- Municipality
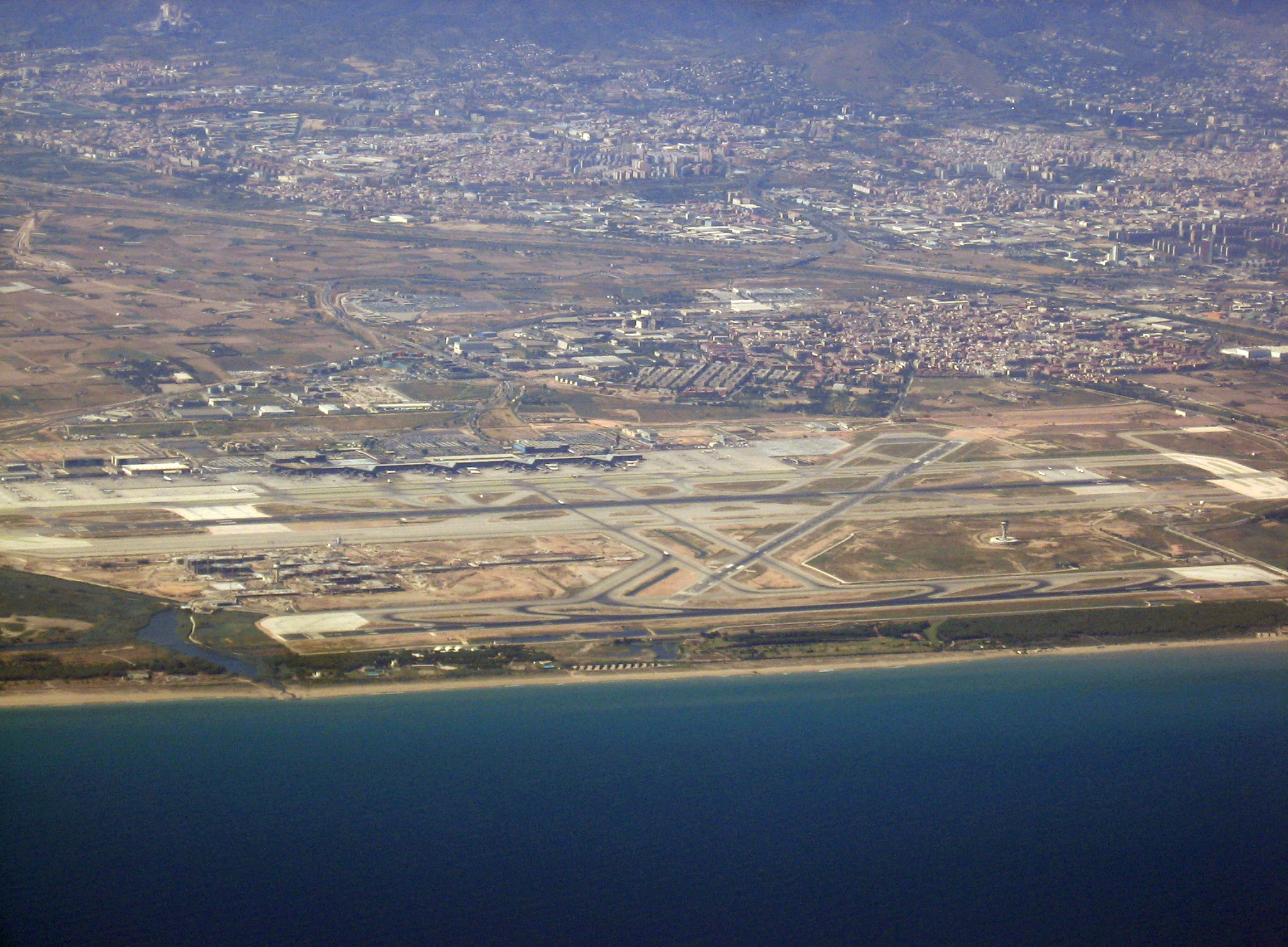
- Aerial view with Barcelona airport in the foreground

- Coat of arms

- Location in Catalonia
- Coordinates: 41°20′N 2°06′E
- Country: Spain
- Autonomous community: Catalonia
- Province: Barcelona
- Comarca: Baix Llobregat

Government
  - Mayor: Lluís Mijoler i Martínez (IC-V)

Area
  - Total: 31.4 km^{2} (12.1 sq mi)
- Elevation: 8 m (26 ft)

Population (2025-01-01)
  - Total: 66,338
  - Density: 2,110/km^{2} (5,470/sq mi)
- Demonym(s): pratense (Spanish), pratenc, -ca (Catalan)
- Website: elprat.cat

El Prat de Llobregat (Catalan pronunciation: [əl ˈpɾad də ʎuβɾəˈɣat]), commonly known as El Prat ([əl ˈpɾat]), is a municipality of Spain located in the comarca of Baix Llobregat in Catalonia. The Josep Tarradellas Barcelona–El Prat Airport largely lies within the municipal limits. It is part of the Barcelona metropolitan area.

== Geography ==
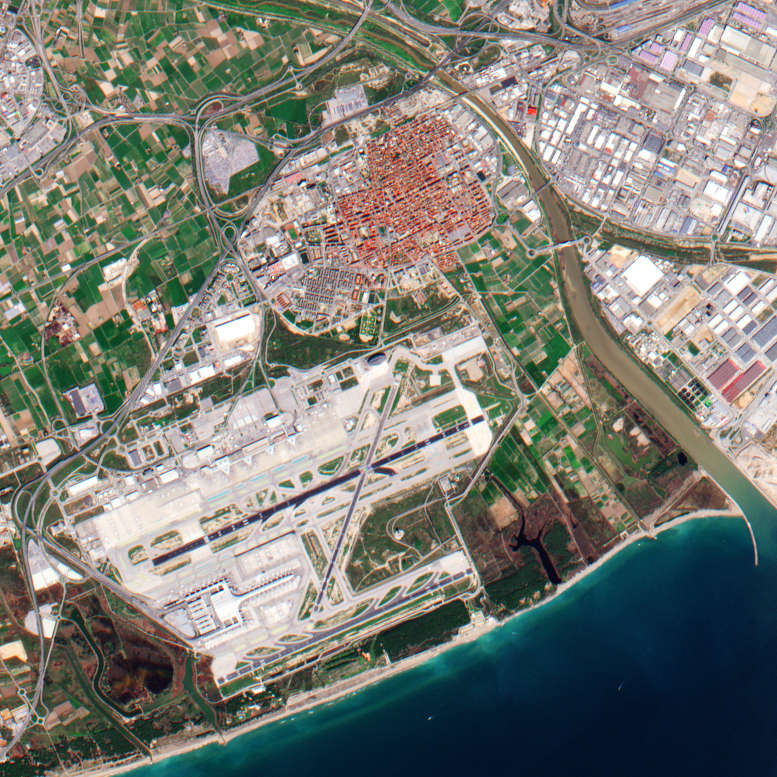
El Prat as seen by the European Space Agency's Copernicus Sentinel-2 mission.

It is situated in the delta of the Llobregat river on the right bank, bordering the coast of the Mediterranean Sea between Barcelona and Viladecans. More than a quarter of the area of the municipality is occupied by Barcelona–El Prat Airport. Apart from the transport links to the airport, the town of El Prat is served by a railway station on the coast line from Barcelona to Valencia. The municipality also has a beach and a small nature reserve at the Llac (Lake) de la Ricarda i del Remolar. El Prat is famous for its blue-legged chickens (known as gall potablava in Catalan). El Prat forms part of the metropolitan area of Barcelona.

== History ==
El Prat was founded between the years 1720 and 1740, when the town started to grow besides a path crossing. The first buildings to appear were the church (dedicated to St. Peter and St. Paul), the hostel (which served as a school, bakery, and obviously as a hostel), and some other houses built by the farmers of the delta, who came to the church to pray.

After this, the installation of a ferry to cross the river and, later, the construction of the Ferran Puig bridge, the arrival of the railroad and the discovery of underground water improved the communication of El Prat and consequently doubled its population. In 1917, the installation on the town of La Papelera Espanola, a factory producing paper and derivatives, started the industrial years of El Prat.

Next, in 1923, three private aerodromes started operations in El Prat, due to the flat terrain of the municipality. That was the beginning of the connection between El Prat and the world of aviation, that would end up creating Barcelona International Airport after the unification of the three aerodromes in 1948.

In 1926, another company, this time of the textile sector, called "La Seda de Barcelona", built a factory in the town. That caused the final spurt of growth of El Prat. With the immigration of people from the south of Spain (mostly Andalusia and Extremadura), the town almost doubled in size by 1930, and again by 1950, and then increased its size threefold in 1970 with the creation of the neighborhoods of Sant Cosme, Sant Jordi and La Granja, built to be the home of these immigrants. Finally, with the next expansion, the population doubled in size once again, although has now reached a period of stability.

== Demography ==
1900	1930	1950	1970	1986	2011
2,804	6,694	10,401	36,363	63,052	63,499

== Climate ==
El Prat de Llobregat has a typical Csa Mediterranean climate.

Climate data for El Prat de Llobregat Josep Tarradellas Barcelona–El Prat Airport (1991-2020)
Month	Jan	Feb	Mar	Apr	May	Jun	Jul	Aug	Sep	Oct	Nov	Dec	Year
Mean daily maximum °C (°F)	14.0 (57.2)	14.5 (58.1)	16.4 (61.5)	18.5 (65.3)	21.7 (71.1)	25.5 (77.9)	28.3 (82.9)	28.9 (84.0)	26.0 (78.8)	22.3 (72.1)	17.6 (63.7)	14.5 (58.1)	20.7 (69.2)
Daily mean °C (°F)	9.7 (49.5)	10.2 (50.4)	12.3 (54.1)	14.5 (58.1)	17.8 (64.0)	21.7 (71.1)	24.5 (76.1)	25.1 (77.2)	22.1 (71.8)	18.3 (64.9)	13.3 (55.9)	10.4 (50.7)	16.7 (62.0)
Mean daily minimum °C (°F)	5.5 (41.9)	5.9 (42.6)	8.1 (46.6)	10.4 (50.7)	13.8 (56.8)	17.9 (64.2)	20.8 (69.4)	21.3 (70.3)	18.0 (64.4)	14.3 (57.7)	9.1 (48.4)	6.2 (43.2)	12.6 (54.7)
Average precipitation mm (inches)	41.3 (1.63)	30.1 (1.19)	41.7 (1.64)	47.3 (1.86)	41.9 (1.65)	26.3 (1.04)	27.3 (1.07)	51.2 (2.02)	86.1 (3.39)	82.1 (3.23)	45.5 (1.79)	37.3 (1.47)	558.1 (21.98)
Average precipitation days (≥ 1 mm)	4.2	3.4	4.4	5.6	4.6	3.1	2.1	4.2	6.0	6.4	4.6	3.9	52.5
Average relative humidity (%)	68	67	68	68	67	65	65	66	68	72	69	69	68
Mean monthly sunshine hours	136	164	214	228	257	267	298	273	222	177	135	118	2,489
Percentage possible sunshine	46	54	57	57	57	59	65	64	60	51	46	41	55
Source: Agencia Estatal de Meteorología

Climate data for El Prat(data from 1935-1969)
Month	Jan	Feb	Mar	Apr	May	Jun	Jul	Aug	Sep	Oct	Nov	Dec	Year
Mean daily maximum °C (°F)	12.8 (55.0)	13.8 (56.8)	15.3 (59.5)	17.8 (64.0)	20.9 (69.6)	24.6 (76.3)	27.3 (81.1)	27.4 (81.3)	25.4 (77.7)	21.5 (70.7)	17.0 (62.6)	13.7 (56.7)	19.8 (67.6)
Daily mean °C (°F)	8.4 (47.1)	9.2 (48.6)	11.2 (52.2)	13.5 (56.3)	16.4 (61.5)	20.4 (68.7)	23.0 (73.4)	23.3 (73.9)	21.4 (70.5)	17.2 (63.0)	12.7 (54.9)	9.6 (49.3)	15.5 (59.9)
Mean daily minimum °C (°F)	4.1 (39.4)	4.5 (40.1)	7.2 (45.0)	9.2 (48.6)	12.0 (53.6)	16.3 (61.3)	18.8 (65.8)	19.2 (66.6)	17.3 (63.1)	13.0 (55.4)	8.4 (47.1)	5.4 (41.7)	11.3 (52.3)
Source: Sistema de Clasificación Bioclimática Mundial

== Economy ==
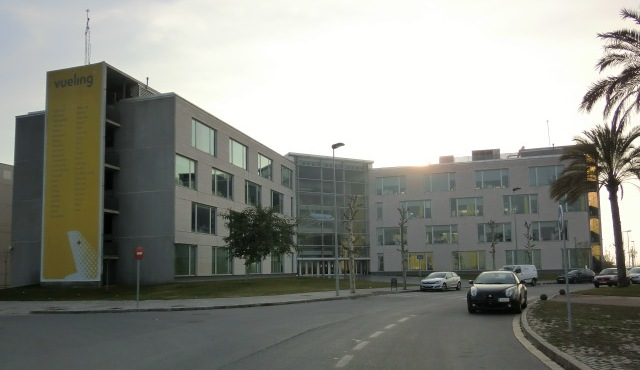
Vueling Airlines head office in El Prat de Llobregat

At El Prat De Llobregat stands the Gearbox del Prat plant, fully owned by the Spanish car maker SEAT, which is one of the five production sites in the world manufacturing transmission parts and gearboxes for the Volkswagen Group.
Also Vueling Airlines formerly had its head office in the Parque de Negocios Mas Blau II in El Prat de Llobregat. Before its dissolution, Clickair had its head office in El Prat de Llobregat.

== Schools and education ==
Public centers in El Prat de Llobregat:

Preschool

- Sol Solet
- Dumbo
- El Cabusset
- La Vailets
- El Xumet del Prat
- Llar d'infants Hello Kitty

Kindergarten and primary education (CEIP)

- Joan Maragall
- Escola Mare de Déu del Carme
- Jacint Verdaguer
- Charles Darwin
- Josep Tarradellas
- Sant Cosme i Sant Damià
- Bernat Metge
- Escola del Parc
- Galileo Galilei
- Sant Jaume
- Jaume Balmes
- Pompeu Fabra
- Ramón Llull

Private schools (primary education and secondary education)

- Col·legi Seda
- Acadèmia Nuestra Señora del Mar García-Lorca
- Escola Mare de Déu del Carme

Secondary education and baccalaureate (INS)

- Estany de la Ricarda
- Baldiri Guilera
- Salvador Dalí
- Doctor Trueta
- Illa dels Banyols
- Institut Ribera Baixa

Special education center (CEE)

- Can Rigol

Adult schools (EPA)

- Sant Cosme
- Terra Baixa

== See also ==
- Metropolitan area of Barcelona
- Zona Franca (Barcelona)
