= Raimondas Šiugždinis =

Lithuanian sailor (born 1967)

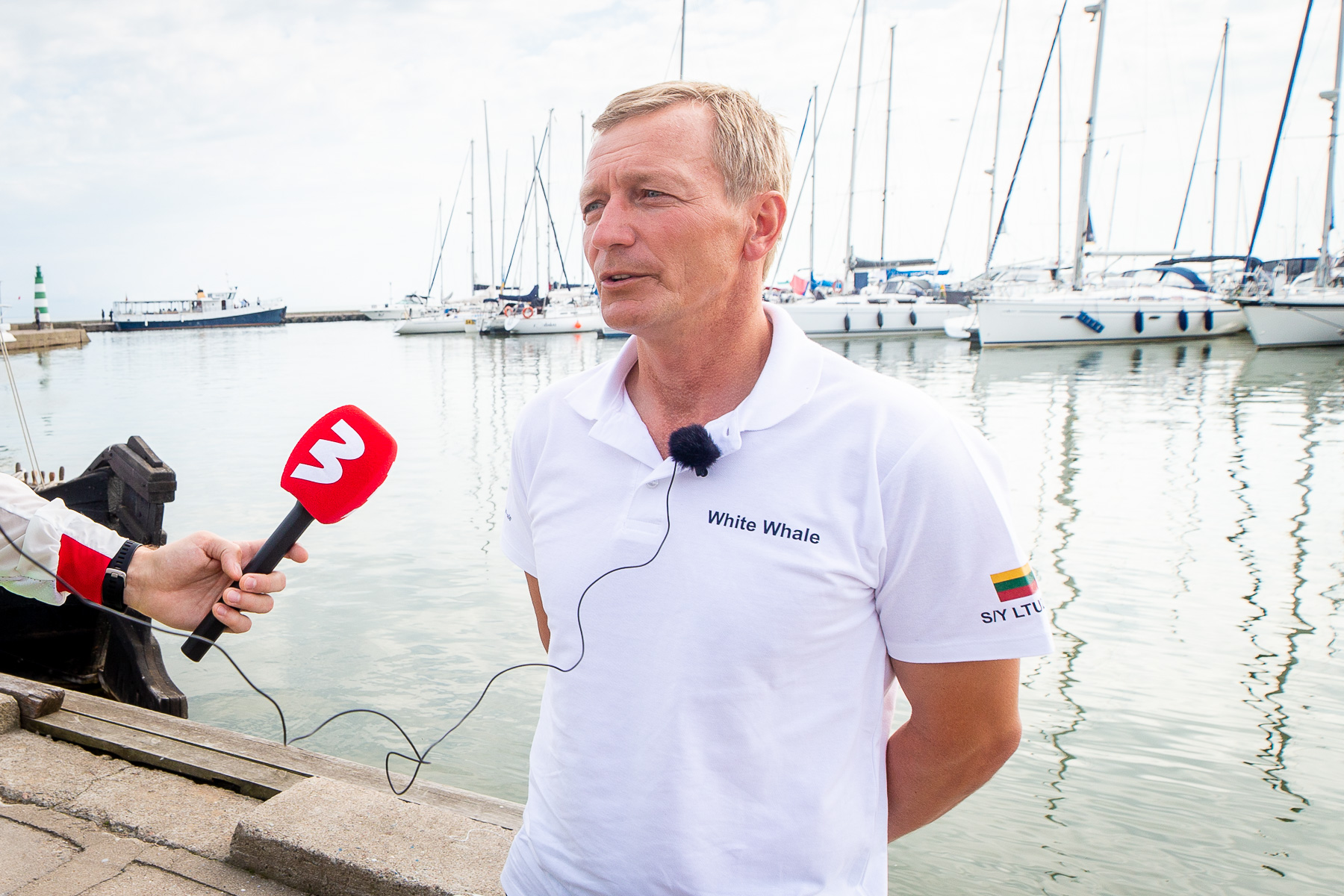

Personal information
- Born: 8 October 1967 (age 58)

Sport
- Country: Lithuania
Medal record
Representing Lithuania
Men's Sailing
World Championships
Gold medal – first place	1997 Mohammedia	Laser Radial
Silver medal – second place	2019 Malmö	X-35
Bronze medal – third place	2021 Nida	Platu 25
European Championships
Gold medal – first place	1997 Mohammedia	Laser Radial

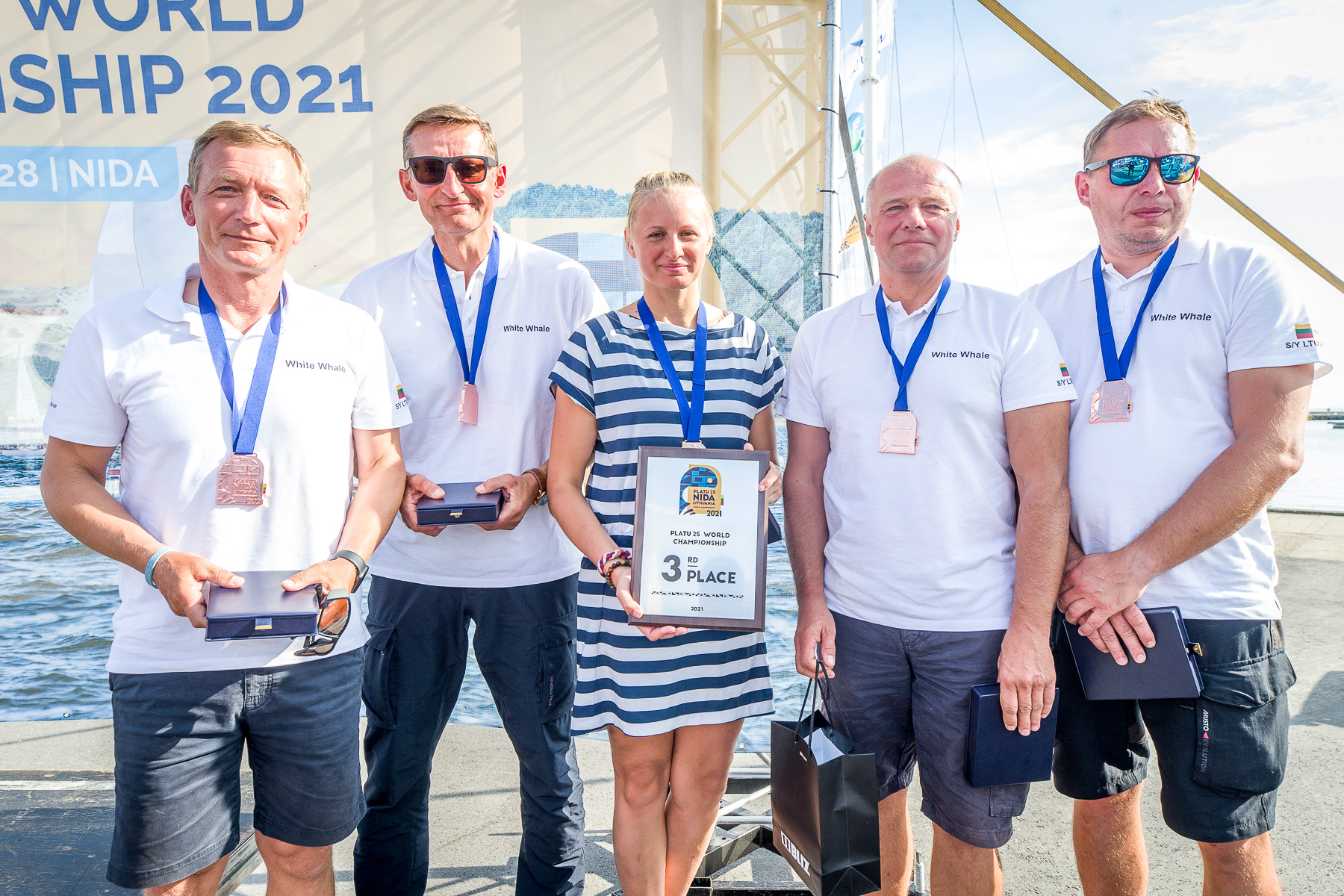
2021 Platu 25 World Championship team White Whale (skipper R. Šiugždinis)

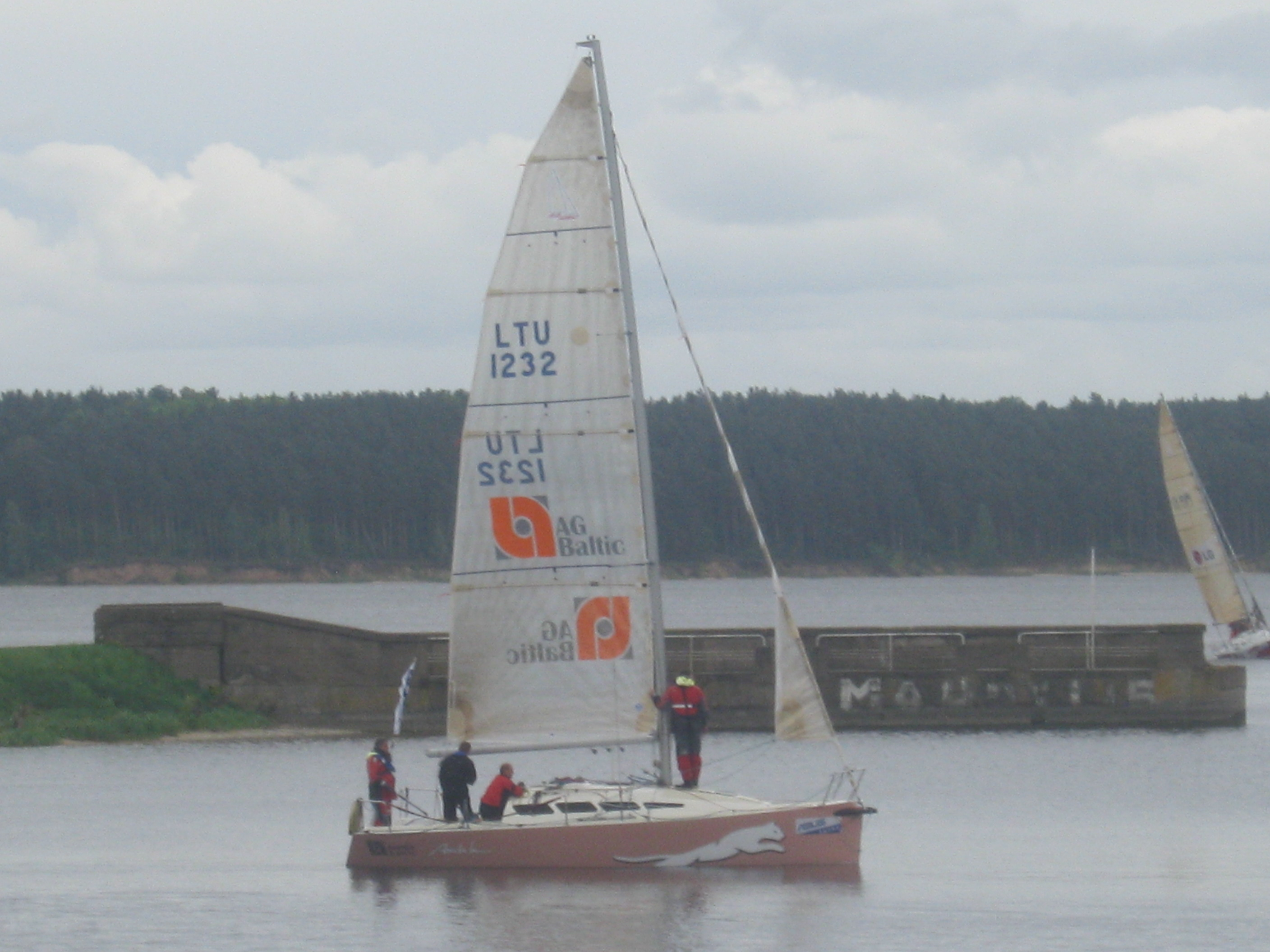
2012

Raimondas Šiugždinis (born 8 October 1967) is an dinghy sailor from Lithuania. World and Europe champion in 1997. One of the founders of RS-280 class.

== Results ==
Year	Class	Competition	Position
1992	470	Olympic Games	32nd
1995	Laser	European Championships	4th
1995	Laser	European Cup	1st
1996	Laser	European Championships	4th
1997	Laser	World Championships	11h
1997	Laser Radial	European Cup	1st
1997	Laser Radial	Europe Championships	1st
1997	Laser Radial	World Championships	1st
1998	Laser Radial	World Championships	4th
2001	Laser Radial	World Championships	15th

National Championships

Year	Class	Competition	Position
1984	Laser	Lithuania Championships	1st
1985	Laser	Lithuania Championships	1st
1985	470	Lithuania Championships	1st
1986	470	Soviet Union Junior Championships	1st
1989	Laser	Soviet Union Championships	2nd
1990	Laser	Lithuania Championships	1st
1990	470	Lithuania Championships	1st
1992	Laser	Lithuania Championships	1st
1992	470	Lithuania Championships	1st
1995	Laser Radial	Lithuania Championships	1st
1996	Laser Radial	Lithuania Championships	1st
2004	R-280	Lithuania Championships	1st
2005	R-280	Lithuania Championships	1st
2006	R-280	Lithuania Championships	1st
2007	R-280	Lithuania Championships	1st
2008	R-280	Lithuania Championships	1st
2009	R-280	Lithuania Championships	1st
2011	R-280	Lithuania Championships	1st

Awards
Preceded by (Lithuania) Arvydas Sabonis	Best Lithuanian sportsman of the Year; 1997	Succeeded by (Lithuania) Diana Žiliūtė
