= Port Olímpic =

Marina in Barcelona, Catalonia, Spain

Coordinates: 41°23′12″N 2°12′1″E

The Port Olímpic (Catalan pronunciation: [əl ˈpɔrt uˈlimpik], English: Olympic Harbour) is a marina located in Barcelona, Catalonia, east of the Port of Barcelona. The venue was opened in 1991.

It hosted the sailing events for the 1992 Summer Olympics and was the main venue for the 2024 America's Cup.

== Gallery ==
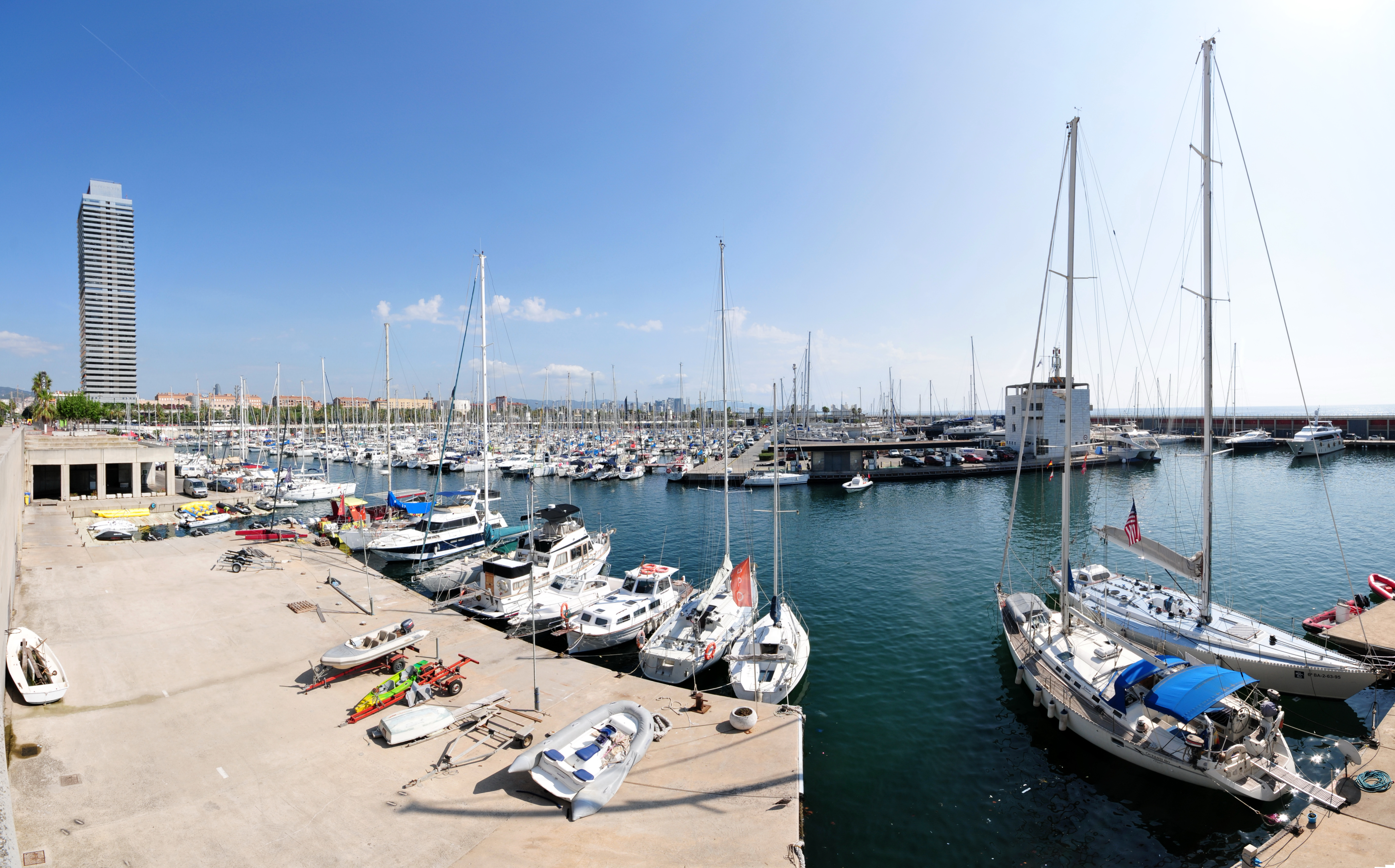
Port Olímpic

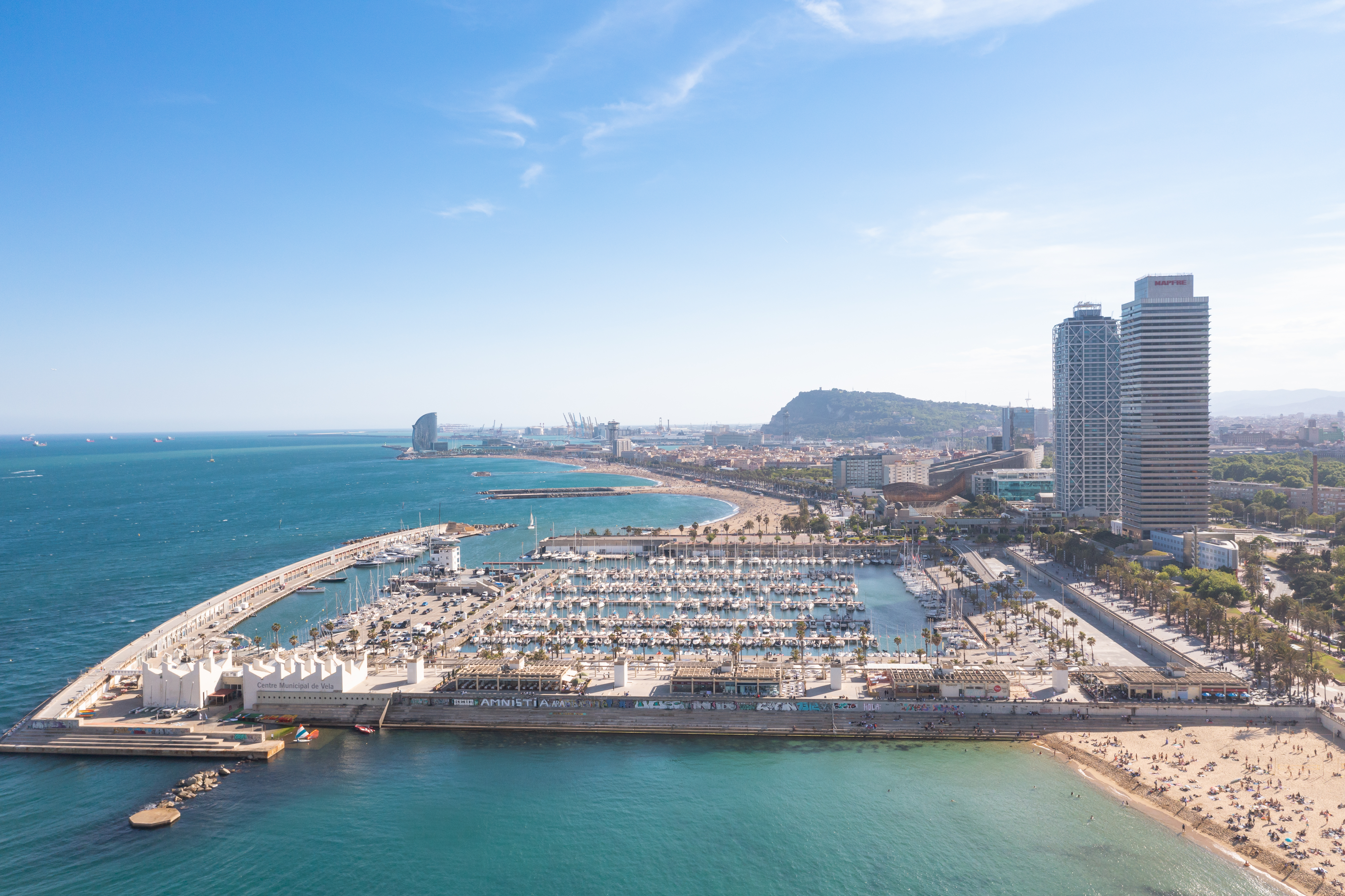
Port Olímpic in Barcelona, Spain
