= Motohiro Hirobe =

Japanese sailor

Personal information
- Nationality: Japanese
- Born: 29 March 1960 (age 64)

Sport
- Sport: Sailing

Motohiro Hirobe (広部 元博, Hirobe Motohiro, born 29 March 1960) is a Japanese sailor. He competed in the men's 470 event at the 1992 Summer Olympics.
