= Platu 25 =

International racing sailing class

- Class symbol

Development
- Designer: Bruce Farr
- Location: New Zealand
- Year: 1994
- Design: Farr Yacht Design

Boat
- Crew: 4 minimum 400kg max
- Displacement: 1,240 kg (2,730 lb)

Hull
- Type: Keelboat
- LOH: 7.51 m
- Beam: 2.56 m (8 ft 5 in)

Sails
- Mainsail area: 21.2 m^{2}
- Spinnaker area: 44.5 m^{2}

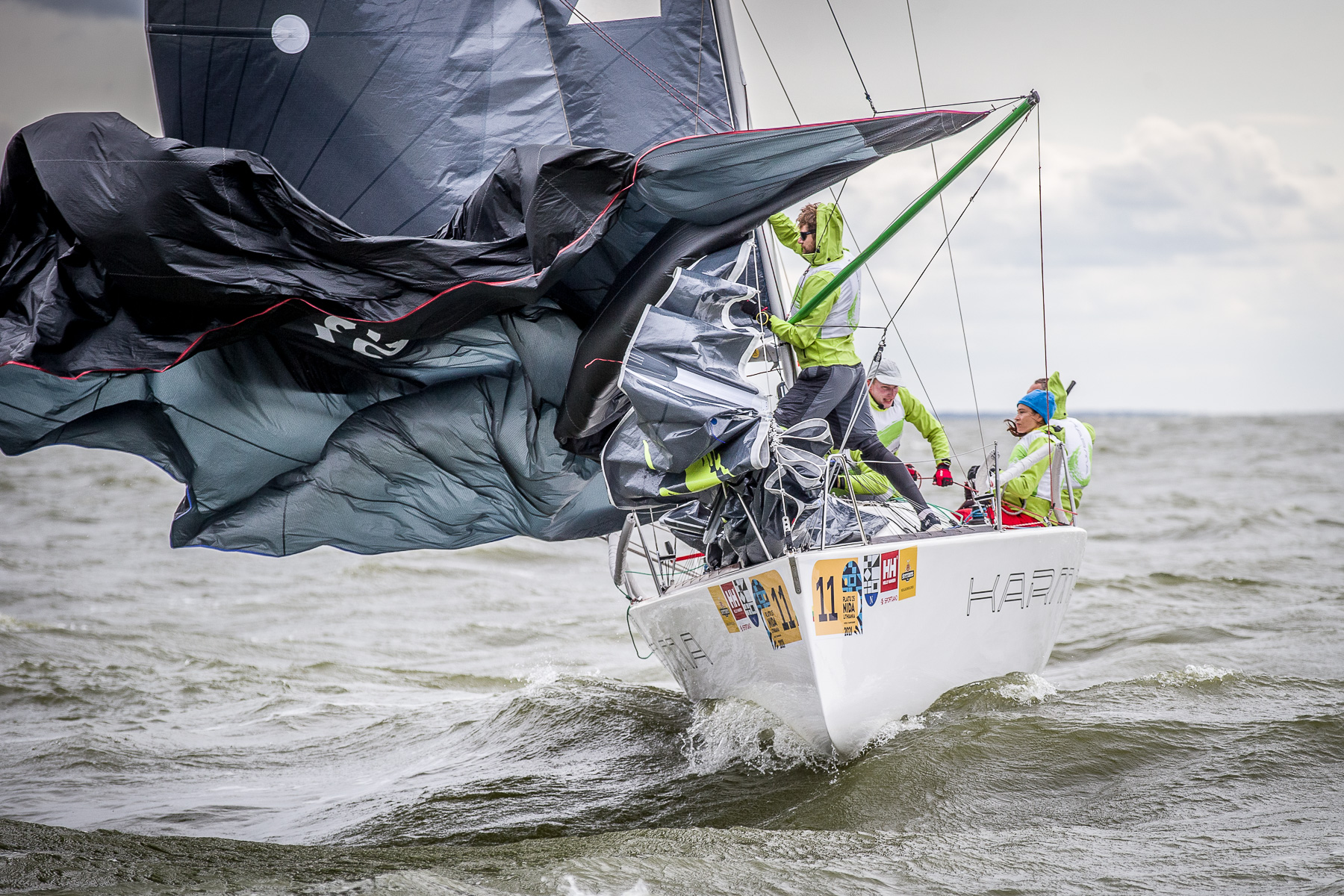

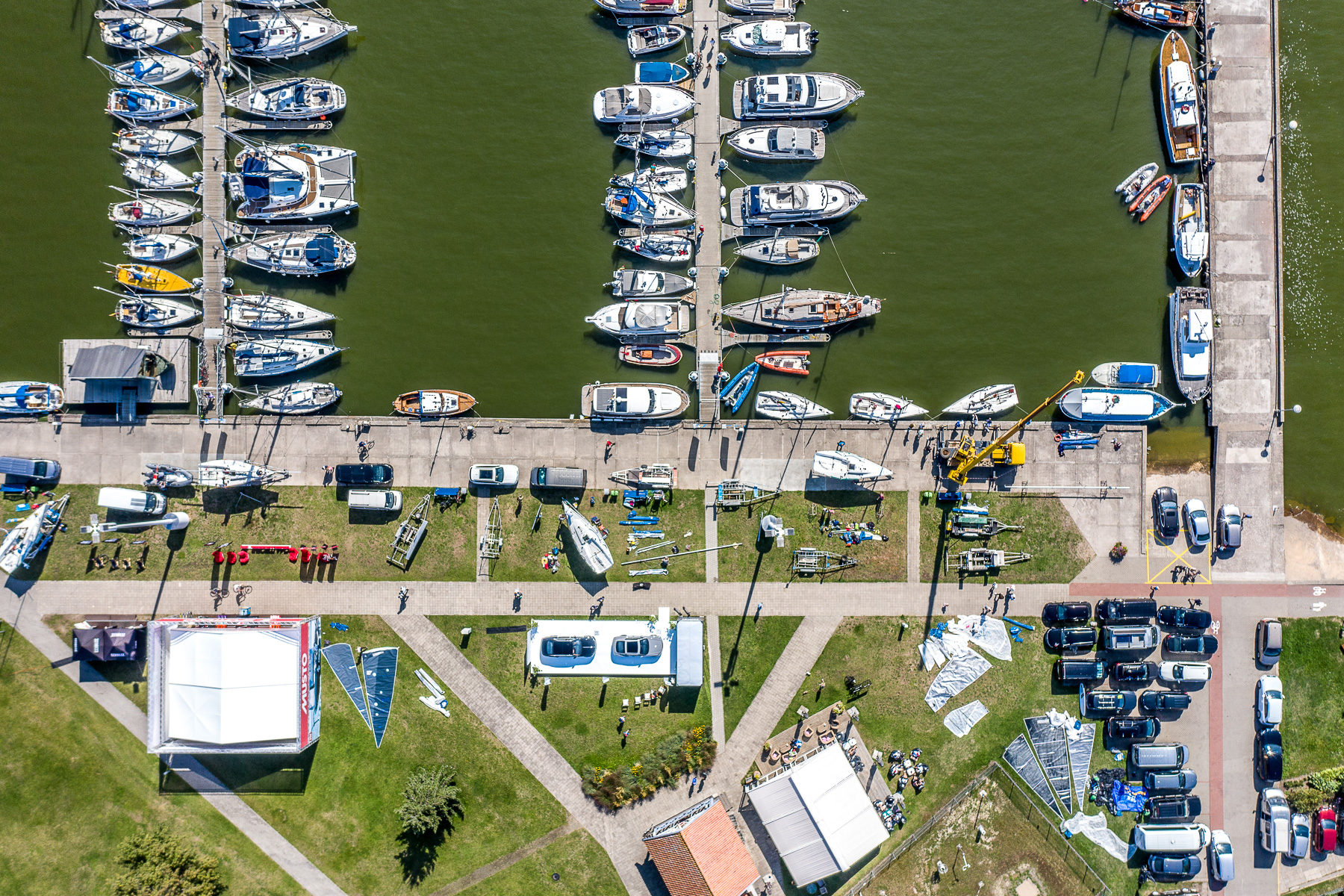
2021 Platu 25 World Championship

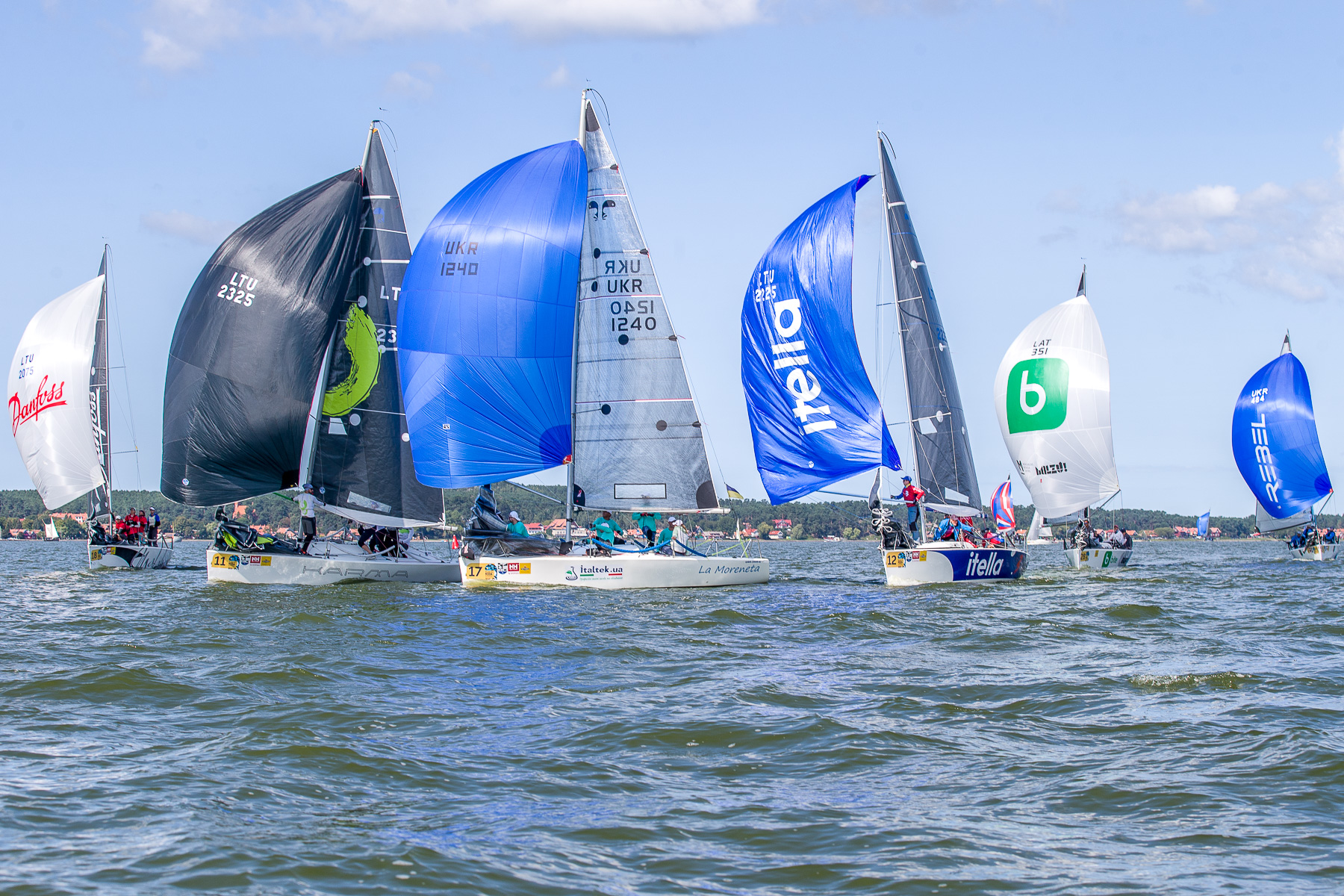
2021 Platu 25 World Championship

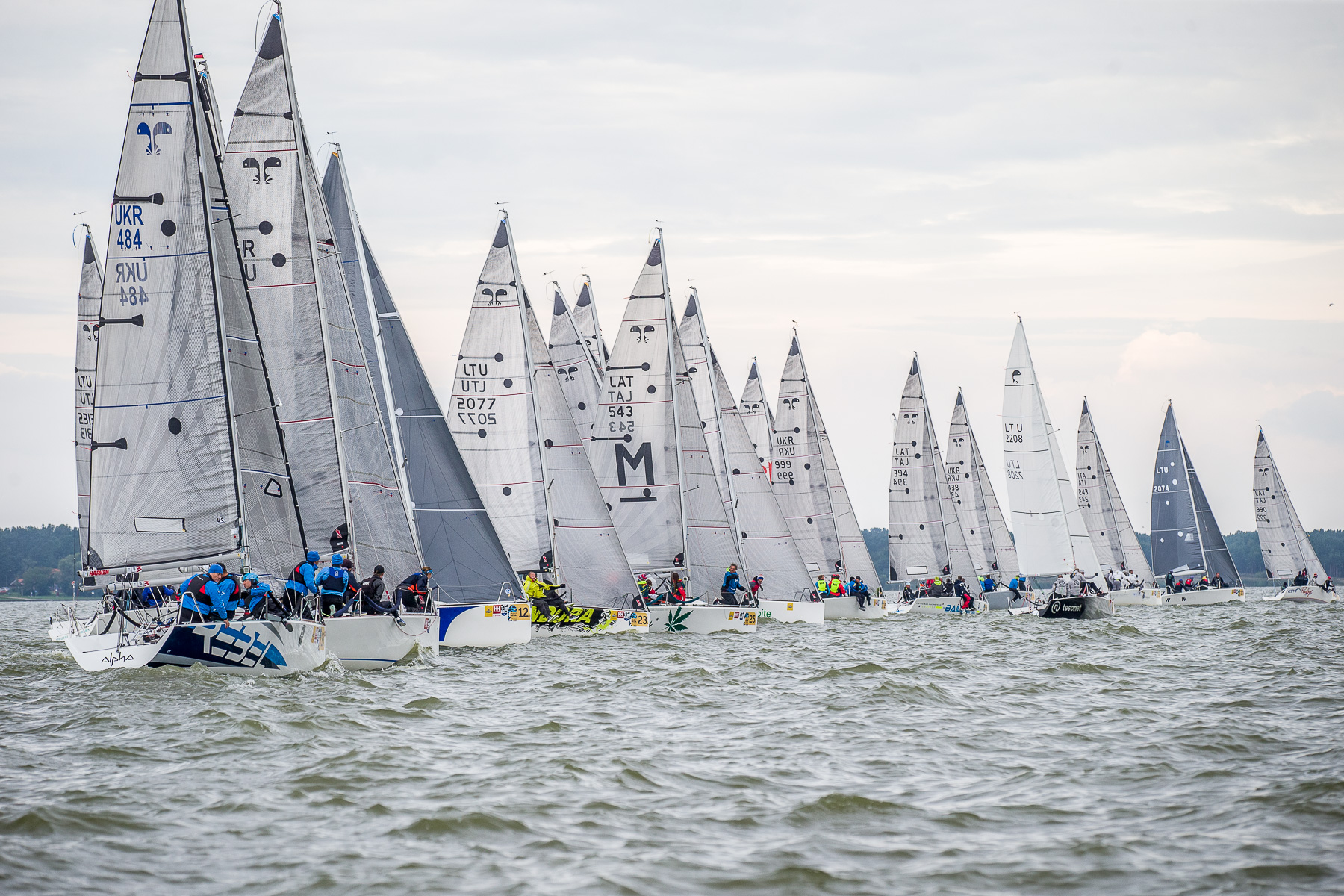
2021 Platu 25 World Championship

The Platu 25 (formerly Beneteau 25) is a sailing boat designed by Farr Yacht Design led by Bruce Farr with the first boat being built by McDell Marine in New Zealand in the early 1990s. It became a class recognised by the International Sailing Federation in November 2006.

== History ==
The International Platu 25 Class Association was formed as the owners association to support the class and promote racing amongst owners which led to it becoming an ISAF-recognised class. This entitled the class to hold World Championships.

The boat current two builders being Beneteau in France and Extreme Sailing Products near Singapore.
