= Equestrian at the 1996 Summer Olympics – Individual eventing =

Equestrian at the Olympics

Individual eventing at the Games of the XXVI Olympiad
- Venue: Georgia International Horse Park
- Date: 23 July 1996 (dressage); 25 July 1996 (cross-country); 26 July 1996 (jumping)
- Competitors: 35 from 19 nations

Medalists
1st place, gold medalist(s)		Blyth Tait	New Zealand
2nd place, silver medalist(s)		Sally Clark	New Zealand
3rd place, bronze medalist(s)		Kerry Millikin	United States

The individual eventing event, part of the equestrian program at the 1996 Summer Olympics, was held from 23 to 26 July 1996 in the Georgia International Horse Park, in Conyers, Georgia. Like all other equestrian events, the eventing competition was mixed gender, with both male and female athletes competing in the same division.

For the 1996 and 2000 Olympic competitions, the individual and team contests were separate events. A rider could compete in both competitions as long as it was on different horses. An example of this is the 2000 individual winner David O'Connor who won his gold medal riding Custom Made, while he earned his team bronze medal with the U.S riding Giltedge.

== Medalists ==
Gold		Silver		Bronze	
New Zealand		New Zealand		United States	
Blyth Tait	Ready Teddy	Sally Clark	Squirrel Hill	Kerry Millikin	Out And About

== Results ==
The total score for each horse and rider was the sum of the total penalty points earned in the various phases of competitions. The pair with the lowest number of penalty points was victorious.

=== Dressage ===
For the dressage portion of the competition, horse and rider pairs performed series of movements that were evaluated by judges. Judges gave marks of 0 to 10 for each movement, subtracting points for errors. The score for each judge was represented the total marks gained. For every point less than a total of 240, 0.2 Penalty Points were assessed.

Rank	Rider	Horse	Nation	Judge H	Judge C	Judge M	Score	Penalty Points
1	Mary King	King William	Great Britain	191	189	182	562	31.6
2	David O'Connor	Custom Made	United States	176	178	178	532	37.6
3	Nikki Bishop	Wishful Thinking	Australia	169	173	178	520	40.0
4	Mara DePuy	Hopper	United States	163	182	174	519	40.2
5	Jean Teulere	Wishful Thinking	France	163	173	178	514	41.2
6	Herbert Blocker	Kiwi Dream	Germany	169	167	172	508	42.4
7	Didier Willefert	Seducteur Biolay	France	170	167	170	507	42.6
8	David Green	Chatsby	Australia	169	166	156	491	45.8
9	Kerry Millikin	Out and About	United States	167	156	159	482	47.6
10	Marie-Christine Duroy	Ut Du Placineau	France	162	156	163	481	47.8
11	Andrew Nicholson	Buckley Province	New Zealand	158	162	158	478	48.4
12	Chris Hunnable	Mr. Bootsie	Great Britain	158	157	158	473	49.4
13	Charlotte Bathe	The Cool Customer	Great Britain	166	161	144	471	49.8
14	Sally Clark	Squirrel Hill	New Zealand	164	150	160	474 +2	51.2
15T	Blyth Tait	Ready Teddy	New Zealand	162	147	153	462	51.6
15T	Artemus de Almeida	Buryand	Brazil	153	153	156	462	51.6
17	Marco Cappai	Night Court	Italy	154	153	152	459	50.0
18	Peter Thomsen	White Girl 3	Germany	158	153	141	452	53.6
19	Nils Haagensen	Troupier	Denmark	154	151	142	447	54.6
20	David Foster	Tilt 'N' Turn	Ireland	158	141	147	446	54.8
21	Kelli Mc Mullen Temple	Amsterdam	Canada	158	141	145	444	55.2
22	Constantin Van Rijckevorsel	Otis	Belgium	156	136	149	441	55.8
23	Hendrik von Paepcke	Amadeus 188	Germany	156	128	155	439	56.2
24	Shigeyuki Hosono	As Du Perche	Japan	141	139	143	423	59.4
25	Roberta Gentini	Zigolo di San Calogero	Italy	143	138	140	421	59.8
26	Javier Revuelta	Hoochi Koochi	Spain	140	139	139	418	60.4
27	Juan Carlos Candisano	Remondo Ofrecido	Argentina	141	128	145	414	61.2
28	Piotr Piasecki	Lady Naleczowianka	Poland	147	130	129	406	62.8
29	Andrew Hoy	Gershwin	Australia	138	138	137	413 +2	63.4
30	Anita Nemtin	Kaesar	Hungary	136	128	129	393	65.4
31	Ramon Beca	Perseus II	Spain	130	118	127	375	69.0
32	Enrique Sarasola Jr.	Rebaby	Spain	132	117	120	369	70.2
33	Fredrik Jonsson	Uflung	Sweden	132	120	124	376 +2	70.8
34	Yoshihiko Kowata	Stars De Riols	Japan	123	117	124	364	71.2
35	Indrajit Lamba	Karishma	India	108	100	115	323	79.4
	Chelan Kozak	Soweto	Canada					WD

=== Cross country ===
In the cross country phase, each pair had to traverse 14.3 kilometers of road and track, 3.1 kilometers of steeplechase, and an obstacle course spread over a track of approximately 7.4 kilometers. Pairs received .4 penalty points for every second beyond the optimal time, up to a limit. Any pair that had not finished in that time was eliminated.

Penalty points were also assessed for disobedience faults at obstacles and for falls. Disobedience faults incurred 20 penalty points, rider falls incurred 65, and horse falls eliminated the pair. The total penalty points from cross country were added to those incurred in phase 1, dressage, for a two-round total.

Rank	Rider	Horse	Nation	SJF	STP	CCJF	CCTP	Total Points
1	Blyth Tait	Ready Teddy	New Zealand	0.00	0.00	0.00	5.20	5.20
2	Sally Clark	Squirrel Hill	New Zealand	0.00	0.00	0.00	9.20	9.20
3	Kerry Millikin	Out and About	United States	0.00	0.00	0.00	19.60	19.60
4	Constantin Van Rijckevorsel	Otis	Belgium	0.00	0.00	0.00	21.60	21.60
5T	Jean Teulere	Wishful Thinking	France	0.00	0.00	0.00	26.00	26.00
5T	Hendrik von Paepcke	Amadeus 188	Germany	0.00	0.00	0.00	26.00	26.00
7	Charlotte Bathe	The Cool Customer	Great Britain	0.00	0.00	0.00	28.80	28.80
8	David O'Connor	Custom Made	United States	0.00	0.00	0.00	30.80	30.80
9	Chris Hunnable	Mr. Bootsie	Great Britain	0.00	0.00	0.00	32.00	32.00
10	Fredrik Jonsson	Uflung	Sweden	0.00	0.00	0.00	39.60	39.60
11	Didier Willefert	Seducteur Biolay	France	0.00	0.00	0.00	41.60	41.60
12	Mara DePuy	Hopper	United States	0.00	0.00	20.00	24.80	44.80
13	Mary King	King William	Great Britain	0.00	0.00	20.00	26.40	46.4
14	Andrew Hoy	Gershwin	Australia	0.00	0.00	20.00	29.20	49.2
15	Marco Cappai	Night Court	Italy	0.00	0.00	20.00	30.80	50.80
16	Ramon Beca	Perseus II	Spain	0.00	0.00	0.00	72.00	72.00
17	Roberta Gentini	Zigolo di San Calogero	Italy	0.00	0.00	20.00	59.20	79.20
18	Kelli Mc Mullen Temple	Amsterdam	Canada	0.00	0.00	40.00	61.60	101.60
19	Herbert Blocker	Kiwi Dream	Germany	0.00	0.00	40.00	71.20	111.20
20	Anita Nemtin	Kaesar	Hungary	0.00	0.00	60.00	79.20	139.20
	Marie-Christine Duroy	Ut Du Placineau	France					DNF
	David Foster	Tilt 'N' Turn	Ireland					DNF
	David Green	Chatsby	Australia					DNF
	Nils Haagensen	Troupier	Denmark					DNF
	Andrew Nicholson	Buckley Province	New Zealand					DNF
	Javier Revuelta	Hoochi Koochi	Spain					DNF
	Nikki Bishop	Wishful Thinking	Australia					DQ
	Shigeyuki Hosono	As Du Perche	Japan					DQ
	Yoshihiko Kowata	Stars De Riols	Japan					DQ
	Piotr Piasecki	Lady Naleczowianka	Poland					DQ
	Enrique Sarasola Jr.	Rebaby	Spain					DQ
	Artemus de Almeida	Buryand	Brazil		6.40			DQ
	Indrajit Lamba	Karishma	India		24.00			DQ
	Peter Thomsen	White Girl 3	Germany					WD
	Juan Candisano	Remondo Ofrecido	Argentina					WD
	Chelan Kozak	Soweto	Canada					WD

==== Total after Dressage and Cross Country ====
Rank	Rider	Horse	Nation	Dressage	Cross Country	Total Penalty Points
1	Blyth Tait	Ready Teddy	New Zealand	51.60	5.20	56.80
2	Sally Clark	Squirrel Hill	New Zealand	51.20	9.20	60.40
3	Kerry Millikin	Out and About	United States	47.60	19.60	67.20
4	Jean Teulere	Wishful Thinking	France	41.20	26.00	67.20
5	David O'Connor	Custom Made	United States	37.60	30.80	68.40
6	Constantin Van Rijckevorsel	Otis	Belgium	55.80	21.60	77.40
7	Mary King	King William	Great Britain	31.60	46.40	78.00
8	Charlotte Bathe	The Cool Customer	Great Britain	49.80	28.80	78.60
9	Chris Hunnable	Mr. Bootsie	Great Britain	49.40	32.00	81.40
10	Hendrik von Paepcke	Amadeus 188	Germany	56.20	26.00	82.20
11	Didier Willefert	Seducteur Biolay	France	42.60	41.60	84.20
12	Mara DePuy	Hopper	United States	40.20	44.80	85.00
13	Marco Cappai	Night Court	Italy	52.20	50.80	103.00
14	Fredrik Jonsson	Uflung	Sweden	70.80	39.60	110.40
15	Andrew Hoy	Gershwin	Australia	63.40	49.20	112.60
16	Roberta Gentini	Zigolo di San Calogero	Italy	59.80	79.20	139.00
17	Ramon Beca	Perseus II	Spain	69.00	72.00	141.00
18	Herbert Blocker	Kiwi Dream	Germany	42.20	111.20	153.60
19	Kelli Mc Mullen Temple	Amsterdam	Canada	55.20	101.60	156.80
20	Anita Nemtin	Kaesar	Hungary	65.40	139.20	204.60
	Nikki Bishop	Wishful Thinking	Australia	40.00	EL	EL
	Artemus de Almeida	Buryand	Brazil	51.60	EL	EL
	Indrajit Lamba	Karishma	India	79.40	EL	EL
	Shigeyuki Hosono	As Du Perche	Japan	59.40	EL	EL
	Yoshihiko Kowata	Stars De Riols	Japan	71.20	EL	EL
	Piotr Piasecki	Lady Naleczowianka	Poland	62.80	EL	EL
	Enrique Sarasola Jr.	Rebaby	Spain	70.20	EL	EL
	David Green	Chatsby	Australia	45.80	RT	RT
	Nils Haagensen	Troupier	Denmark	54.60	RT	RT
	Marie-Christine Duroy	Ut Du Placineau	France	47.80	RT	RT
	David Foster	Tilt 'N' Turn	Ireland	54.80	RT	RT
	Andrew Nicholson	Buckley Province	New Zealand	48.40	RT	RT
	Javier Revuelta	Hoochi Koochi	Spain	60.40	RT	RT
	Peter Thomsen	White Girl 3	Germany	53.60	WD	WD
	Chelan Kozak	Soweto	Canada	WD		WD

=== Show jumping ===
In show jumping, pairs received 4 penalty points for each obstacle knocked down, 4 penalty points for the horse's first disobedience, and 8 penalty points for the rider's first fall. They also received 1 penalty point for each second over the optimum time.

They could be eliminated for a second disobedience, the rider's second fall, the horse's first fall, or taking more than twice the optimum time to finish the course.

Rank	Rider	Horse	Nation	Faults	Time	Penalty Points
1T	Andrew Hoy	Gershwin	Australia	0	0	0
1T	Sally Clark	Squirrel Hill	New Zealand	0	0	0
1T	Blyth Tait	Ready Teddy	New Zealand	0	0	0
1T	Mara DePuy	Hopper	United States	0	0	0
5T	Didier Willefert	Seducteur Biolay	France	-5.00	5.00	0
5T	Hendrik von Paepcke	Amadeus 188	Germany	-5.00	5.00	0
7	Anita Nemtin	Kaesar	Hungary	-5.25	5.00	0.25
8T	Herbert Blocker	Kiwi Dream	Germany	-6.50	5.00	1.50
8T	Kerry Millikin	Out and About	United States	-6.50	5.00	1.50
10	Roberta Gentini	Zigolo di San Calogero	Italy	-7.75	5.00	2.75
11T	Constantin Van Rijckevorsel	Otis	Belgium	-10.00	10.00	0.00
11T	Jean Teulere	Wishful Thinking	France	-10.00	10.00	0.00
13	David O'Connor	Custom Made	United States	-11.75	10.00	1.75
14	Kelli Mc Mullen Temple	Amsterdam	Canada	-15.00	15.00	0.00
15	Fredrik Jonsson	Uflung	Sweden	-16.75	15.00	1.75
16	Ramon Beca	Perseus II	Spain	-23.75	20.00	3.75
17	Chris Hunnable	Mr. Bootsie	Great Britain	-30.00	30.00	0.00
18	Marco Cappai	Night Court	Italy	-35.00	35.00	10.0
19	Mary King	King William	Great Britain	-40.00	40.00	0.00
	Charlotte Bathe	The Cool Customer	Great Britain			WD
	Nikki Bishop	Wishful Thinking	Australia			EL
	Artemus de Almeida	Buryand	Brazil			EL
	Indrajit Lamba	Karishma	India			EL
	Shigeyuki Hosono	As Du Perche	Japan			EL
	Yoshihiko Kowata	Stars De Riols	Japan			EL
	Piotr Piasecki	Lady Naleczowianka	Poland			EL
	Enrique Sarasola Jr.	Rebaby	Spain			EL
	David Green	Chatsby	Australia			RT
	Nils Haagensen	Troupier	Denmark			RT
	Marie-Christine Duroy	Ut Du Placineau	France			RT
	David Foster	Tilt 'N' Turn	Ireland			RT
	Andrew Nicholson	Buckley Province	New Zealand			RT
	Javier Revuelta	Hoochi Koochi	Spain			RT
	Peter Thomsen	White Girl 3	Germany			WD
	Chelan Kozak	Soweto	Canada			WD

=== Final Total ===
Rank	Rider	Horse	Nation	Dressage	Cross Country	Jumping	Total Penalty Points
1st place, gold medalist(s)	Blyth Tait	Ready Teddy	New Zealand	51.60	5.20	0.00	56.80
2nd place, silver medalist(s)	Sally Clark	Squirrel Hill	New Zealand	51.20	9.20	0.00	60.40
3rd place, bronze medalist(s)	Kerry Millikin	Out and About	United States	47.60	19.60	6.50	73.20
4	Jean Teulere	Wishful Thinking	France	41.20	26.00	10.00	77.20
5	David O'Connor	Custom Made	United States	37.60	30.80	11.75	80.15
6	Mara DePuy	Hopper	United States	40.20	44.80	0.00	85.00
7	Hendrik von Paepcke	Amadeus 188	Germany	56.20	26.00	5.00	87.20
8	Constantin Van Rijckevorsel	Otis	Belgium	55.80	21.60	10.00	87.40
9	Didier Willefert	Seducteur Biolay	France	42.60	41.60	5.00	89.20
10	Chris Hunnable	Mr. Bootsie	Great Britain	49.60	32.00	30.00	111.40
11	Andrew Hoy	Gershwin	Australia	63.40	49.20	0.00	112.60
12	Mary King	King William	Great Britain	31.60	46.40	40.00	118.00
13	Fredrik Jönsson	Uflung	Sweden	70.80	39.60	16.75	127.15
14	Marco Cappai	Night Court	Italy	52.20	50.80	35.00	138.00
15	Roberta Gentini	Zigolo di San Calogero	Italy	59.80	79.20	7.75	146.75
16	Herbert Blocker	Kiwi Dream	Germany	42.40	111.20	6.50	160.10
17	Ramon Beca	Perseus II	Spain	69.00	72.00	23.75	164.75
18	Kelli McMullen-Temple	Amsterdam	Canada	55.20	101.60	15.00	171.80
19	Anita Nemtin	Kaesar	Hungary	45.0	72.8	0	117.8
	Charlotte Bathe	The Cool Customer	Great Britain	49.80	28.80	WD	WD
	Nikki Bishop	Wishful Thinking	Australia	40.00	EL		EL
	Artemus de Almeida	Buryand	Brazil	51.60	EL		EL
	Indrajit Lamba	Karishma	India	79.40	EL		EL
	Shigeyuki Hosono	As Du Perche	Japan	59.40	EL		EL
	Yoshihiko Kowata	Stars De Riols	Japan	71.20	EL		EL
	Enrique Sarasola Jr.	Rebaby	Spain	70.20	EL		EL
	David Green	Chatsby	Australia	45.80	RT		RT
	Nils Haagensen	Troupier	Denmark	54.60	RT		RT
	Marie-Christine Duroy	Ut Du Placineau	France	47.80	RT		RT
	David Foster	Tilt 'N' Turn	Ireland	54.80	RT		RT
	Andrew Nicholson	Buckley Province	New Zealand	48.40	RT		RT
	Piotr Piasecki	Lady Naleczowianka	Poland	62.80	RT		RT
	Javier Revuelta	Hoochi Koochi	Spain	60.40	RT		RT
	Peter Thomsen	White Girl 3	Germany	56.30			RT
	Chelan Kozak	Soweto	Canada	WD			WD

== Sources ==
- Official Report of the 1996 Atlanta Summer Olympics available at https://web.archive.org/web/20060622162855/http://www.la84foundation.org/5va/reports_frmst.htm
