= Equestrian at the 2000 Summer Olympics – Team eventing =

Team eventing at the Games of the XXVII Olympiad
- Venue: Sydney International Equestrian Centre
- Date: 16–19 September 2000
- Competitors: 47 teams from 12 nations

Medalists
| 1st place, gold medalist(s) | | Stuart Tinney, Andrew Hoy, Matt Ryan, Phillip Dutton | Australia |
| 2nd place, silver medalist(s) | | Pippa Funnell, Leslie Law, Jeanette Brakewell, Ian Stark | Great Britain |
| 3rd place, bronze medalist(s) | | Karen O'Connor, David O'Connor, Nina Fout, Linden Wiesman | United States |

The team eventing event, part of the equestrian program at the 2000 Summer Olympics was held from 16 to 19 September 2000 (the dressage was held over two days). The competition was held in the Sydney International Equestrian Centre. In 2000, as in 1996, the team event was a separate event from the individual competition which was held from the 20–22 September. A rider could compete in both competitions (on different horses). This would be the final time to date, that this format of two separate events has been used. Like all other equestrian events, the eventing competition was mixed gender, with both male and female athletes competing in the same division. Twelve teams, each consisting of between three and four horse and rider pairs, entered the contest.

== Results ==
=== Dressage ===
Each team consisted of four pairs of horse and rider. The penalty points of the lowest three pairs were added together to reach the team's penalty points.

| Rank | NOC | Rider | Horse | Judge H | Judge C | Judge M | Total penalties | Scored | Team penalties |
|---|---|---|---|---|---|---|---|---|---|
| 1 | Australia | Andrew Hoy | Darien Powers | 196 | 194 | 207 | 30.6 | # | 112.6 |
| 1 | Australia | Phillip Dutton | House Doctor | 184 | 164 | 172 | 46.0 | # | 112.6 |
| 1 | Australia | Stuart Tinney | Jeepster | 196 | 186 | 188 | 36.0 | # | 112.6 |
| 1 | Australia | Matt Ryan | Kibah Sandstone | 165 | 169 | 177 | 47.8 | | 112.6 |
| 2 | Great Britain | Jeanette Brakewell | Over To You | 171 | 161 | 165 | 50.6 | | 115.2 |
| 2 | Great Britain | Leslie Law | Shear H2O | 182 | 174 | 174 | 44.0 | # | 115.2 |
| 2 | Great Britain | Pippa Funnell | Supreme Rock | 192 | 190 | 208 | 32.0 | # | 115.2 |
| 2 | Great Britain | Ian Stark | Jaybee | 177 | 184 | 193 | 39.2 | # | 115.2 |
| 3 | United States | David O'Connor | Giltedge | 178 | 175 | 175 | 44.4 | # | 125.4 |
| 3 | United States | Nina Fout | 3 Magic Beans | 153 | 149 | 155 | 58.6 | | 125.4 |
| 3 | United States | Linden Wiesman | Anderoo | 167 | 170 | 171 | 48.4 | # | 125.4 |
| 3 | United States | Karen O'Connor | Prince Panache | 192 | 194 | 201 | 32.6 | # | 125.4 |
| 4 | France | Jean-Luc Force | Crocus Jacob | 163 | 178 | 165 | 48.8 | # | 140.2 |
| 4 | France | Jean Teulere | Amouncha | 174 | 161 | 166 | 49.8 | # | 140.2 |
| 4 | France | Didier Willefert | Blakring | 167 | 168 | 165 | 50.0 | | 140.2 |
| 4 | France | Jean-Lou Bigot | Twist La Beige | 187 | 176 | 179 | 41.6 | # | 140.2 |
| 5 | New Zealand | Mark Todd | Diamond Hall Re | 155 | 150 | 152 | 58.6 | | 143.6 |
| 5 | New Zealand | Paul O'Brien | Enzed | 167 | 158 | 170 | 51.0 | # | 143.6 |
| 5 | New Zealand | Blyth Tait | Ready Teddy | 166 | 165 | 169 | 52.0 | # | 143.6 |
| 5 | New Zealand | Vaughn Jefferis | Bounce | 188 | 175 | 184 | 40.6 | # | 143.6 |
| 6 | Germany | Marina Köhncke | Sir Toby 4 | 170 | 160 | 158 | 52.4 | # | 150.4 |
| 6 | Germany | Nele Hagener | Little McMuffin | 144 | 140 | 137 | 65.8 | | 150.4 |
| 6 | Germany | Andreas Dibowski | Leonas Dancer | 147 | 153 | 141 | 61.8 | # | 150.4 |
| 6 | Germany | Ingrid Klimke | Sleep Late | 195 | 184 | 190 | 36.2 | # | 150.4 |
| 7 | Belgium | Constantin van Rijckevorsel | Withcote Nellie | 166 | 156 | 167 | 52.2 | # | 160.4 |
| 7 | Belgium | Kurt Heyndrickx | Archimedes | 167 | 155 | 152 | 55.2 | # | 160.4 |
| 7 | Belgium | Carl Bouckaert | Urbane Des Pins | 168 | 155 | 162 | 53.0 | # | 160.4 |
| 7 | Belgium | Karin Donckers | Gormley | 165 | 148 | 151 | 57.2 | | 160.4 |
| 8 | Italy | Lara Villata | Rubber Ball | 146 | 121 | 132 | 70.2 | | 170.4 |
| 8 | Italy | Giacomo Della Chiesa | Tokyo Joe | 133 | 133 | 135 | 69.8 | # | 170.4 |
| 8 | Italy | Andrea Verdina | Donnizetti | 158 | 146 | 165 | 56.2 | # | 170.4 |
| 8 | Italy | Fabio Magni | Cool'N'Breezy | 165 | 185 | 178 | 44.4 | # | 170.4 |
| 9 | Japan | Shigeyuki Hosono | Urfe Des Landes | 131 | 133 | 139 | 69.4 | | 171.6 |
| 9 | Japan | Masaru Fuse | Voyou Du Roc | 166 | 163 | 163 | 51.6 | # | 171.6 |
| 9 | Japan | Daisuke Kato | Elusive Warlock | 157 | 154 | 153 | 57.2 | # | 171.6 |
| 9 | Japan | Takeaki Tsuchiya | Right on Time | 129 | 147 | 160 | 62.8 | # | 171.6 |
| 10 | Ireland | Susan Shortt | Joy Of My Heart | 134 | 129 | 139 | 69.6 | | 175.8 |
| 10 | Ireland | Patricia Donegan | Don't Step Back | 165 | 152 | 162 | 54.2 | # | 175.8 |
| 10 | Ireland | Nicola Cassidy | Mr Mullins | 153 | 151 | 150 | 59.2 | # | 175.8 |
| 10 | Ireland | Virginia McGrath | The Yellow Earl | 134 | 149 | 155 | 62.4 | # | 175.8 |
| 11 | Spain | Enrique Sarasola Jr. | Super Djarvis | 140 | 150 | 131 | 65.8 | # | 199.6 |
| 11 | Spain | Ramon Beca | Perseus II | 134 | 140 | 144 | 66.4 | # | 199.6 |
| 11 | Spain | Jaime Matossian | New Venture | 142 | 138 | 133 | 67.4 | # | 199.6 |
| 12 | Brazil | Serguei Fofanoff | Sanderston | 124 | 128 | 137 | 72.2 | # | 215.0 |
| 12 | Brazil | Vincente Araujo | Teveri | 144 | 140 | 137 | 87.2 | | 215.0 |
| 12 | Brazil | Eder Pagota | Amazonia | 104 | 103 | 107 | 77.2 | # | 215.0 |
| 12 | Brazil | Luiz Augusto Faria | Hunefer | 136 | 137 | 149 | 65.6 | # | 215.0 |

=== Dressage & Cross Country ===
Each team consisted of four pairs of horse and rider. The penalty points of the lowest three pairs were added together to reach the team's penalty points.

| Rank | NOC | Rider | Horse | Dressage | Scored | A | B | | C | D | | Dressage+ Jumping | Scored | Team penalties |
| Rank | NOC | Rider | Horse | Dressage | Scored | A | Jump | Time | C | Jump | Time | Dressage+ Jumping | Scored | Team penalties |
|---|---|---|---|---|---|---|---|---|---|---|---|---|---|---|
| 1 | Australia | Andrew Hoy | Darien Powers | 30.6 | # | 0 | 0 | 0 | 0 | 0 | 0 | 30.6 | # | 114.2 |
| 1 | Australia | Phillip Dutton | House Doctor | 46.0 | # | 0 | 0 | 0 | 0 | 0 | 1.6 | 47.6 | # | 114.2 |
| 1 | Australia | Stuart Tinney | Jeepster | 36.0 | # | 0 | 0 | 0 | 0 | 0 | 0 | 36.0 | # | 114.2 |
| 1 | Australia | Matt Ryan | Kibah Sandstone | 47.8 | | 0 | 0 | 0 | 0 | 0 | 0.4 | 48.2 | | 114.2 |
| 2 | Great Britain | Jeanette Brakewell | Over To You | 50.6 | | 0 | 0 | 0 | 0 | 0 | 0 | 50.6 | # | 127.0 |
| 2 | Great Britain | Leslie Law | Shear H2O | 44.0 | # | 0 | 0 | 0 | 0 | 0 | 0 | 44.0 | # | 127.0 |
| 2 | Great Britain | Pippa Funnell | Supreme Rock | 32.0 | # | 0 | 0 | 0 | 0 | 0 | 0.4 | 32.4 | # | 127.0 |
| 2 | Great Britain | Ian Stark | Jaybee | 39.2 | # | 0 | 0 | 0 | 0 | 80.0 | 17.2 | 136.4 | | 127.0 |
| 3 | New Zealand | Mark Todd | Diamond Hall Re | 58.6 | | 0 | 0 | 0 | 0 | 0 | 0 | 58.6 | # | 151.2 |
| 3 | New Zealand | Paul O'Brien | Enzed | 51.0 | # | 0 | 0 | 0 | 0 | 40.0 | 19.6 | 110.6 | | 151.2 |
| 3 | New Zealand | Blyth Tait | Ready Teddy | 52.0 | # | 0 | 0 | 0 | 0 | 0 | 0 | 52.0 | # | 151.2 |
| 3 | New Zealand | Vaughn Jefferis | Bounce | 40.6 | # | 0 | 0 | 0 | 0 | 0 | 0 | 40.6 | # | 151.2 |
| 4 | United States | David O'Connor | Giltedge | 44.4 | # | 0 | 0 | 0 | 0 | 0 | 2.4 | 46.8 | # | 160.8 |
| 4 | United States | Nina Fout | 3 Magic Beans | 58.6 | # | 0 | 0 | 2.4 | 0 | 0 | 20.0 | 81.0 | # | 160.8 |
| 4 | United States | Linden Wiesman | Anderoo | 48.4 | # | 0 | 0 | 0 | 0 | 140.0 | | EL | | 160.8 |
| 4 | United States | Karen O'Connor | Prince Panache | 32.6 | # | 0 | 0 | 0 | 0 | 0 | 0.4 | 33.0 | # | 160.8 |
| 5 | Germany | Marina Köhncke | Sir Toby 4 | 52.4 | # | 0 | 0 | 0 | 0 | 0 | 2.0 | 54.4 | # | 220.8 |
| 5 | Germany | Nele Hagener | Little McMuffin | 65.8 | | 0 | 0 | 0 | 0 | 100.0 | 81.6 | 247.4 | | 220.8 |
| 5 | Germany | Andreas Dibowski | Leonas Dancer | 61.8 | # | 0 | 0 | 0 | 0 | 60.0 | 8.4 | 130.2 | # | 220.8 |
| 5 | Germany | Ingrid Klimke | Sleep Late | 36.2 | # | 0 | 0 | 0 | 0 | 0 | 0 | 36.2 | # | 220.8 |
| 6 | Ireland | Susan Shortt | Joy Of My Heart | 69.6 | | 0 | 0 | 0 | 0 | 0 | 0.4 | 70.0 | # | 239.4 |
| 6 | Ireland | Patricia Donegan | Don't Step Back | 54.2 | # | 0 | 0 | 0 | 0 | 0 | 11.6 | 65.8 | # | 239.4 |
| 6 | Ireland | Nicola Cassidy | Mr Mullins | 59.2 | # | 0 | 0 | 0 | 0 | 40.0 | 20.0 | 119.2 | | 239.4 |
| 6 | Ireland | Virginia McGrath | The Yellow Earl | 62.4 | # | 0 | 0 | 0 | 0 | 20.0 | 21.2 | 103.6 | # | 239.4 |
| 7 | Brazil | Serguei Fofanoff | Sanderston | 72.2 | # | 0 | 0 | 0 | 0 | 40.0 | 82.0 | 194.2 | | 266.0 |
| 7 | Brazil | Vincente Araujo | Teveri | 87.2 | | 0 | 0 | 2.4 | 0 | 0 | 25.2 | 114.8 | # | 266.0 |
| 7 | Brazil | Eder Pagota | Amazonia | 77.2 | # | 0 | 0 | 0 | 0 | 0 | 5.6 | 82.8 | # | 266.0 |
| 7 | Brazil | Luiz Augusto Faria | Hunefer | 65.6 | # | 0 | 0 | 0 | 0 | 0 | 2.8 | 68.4 | # | 266.0 |
| 8 | France | Jean-Luc Force | Crocus Jacob | 48.8 | # | 0 | 0 | 0 | 0 | 20 | 4.8 | 73.6 | # | 1186.2 |
| 8 | France | Jean Teulere | Amouncha | 49.8 | # | 0 | 0 | 0 | 0 | 60 | 2.8 | 112.6 | # | 1186.2 |
| 8 | France | Didier Willefert | Blakring | 50.0 | # | 0 | 0 | 0 | 0 | 0 | | RT | | 1186.2 |
| 8 | France | Jean-Lou Bigot | Twist La Beige | 41.6 | # | 0 | 0 | 0 | | | | RT | | 1186.2 |
| 9 | Japan | Shigeyuki Hosono | Urfe Des Landes | 69.8 | | 0 | 0 | 0 | | | | RT | | 1251.6 |
| 9 | Japan | Masaru Fuse | Voyou Du Roc | 51.6 | # | 0 | 0 | 0 | 0 | 80 | 18.8 | 150.4 | # | 1251.6 |
| 9 | Japan | Daisuke Kato | Elusive Warlock | 57.2 | # | 0 | 0 | 0 | 0 | 20 | 24.0 | 101.2 | # | 1251.6 |
| 9 | Japan | Takeaki Tsuchiya | Right on Time | 62.8 | # | 0 | 0 | 0 | | | | RT | | 1251.6 |
| 10 | Belgium | Constantin van Rijckevorsel | Withcote Nellie | 52.2 | # | 0 | 0 | 0 | 0 | 80.0 | | RT | | 1297.0 |
| 10 | Belgium | Kurt Heyndrickx | Archimedes | 55.2 | # | 0 | 0 | 0 | 0 | 20 | 12.0 | 87.2 | # | 1297.0 |
| 10 | Belgium | Carl Bouckaert | Urbane Des Pins | 53.0 | # | 0 | 0 | 0 | 0 | 100 | 56.8 | 209.8 | # | 1297.0 |
| 10 | Belgium | Karin Donckers | Gormley | 57.2 | # | 0 | | | | | | RT | | 1297.0 |
| 11 | Spain | Enrique Sarasola Jr. | Super Djarvis | 65.8 | # | 60 | 0 | 0 | 0 | 0 | 0 | 125.8 | # | 1298.2 |
| 11 | Spain | Ramon Beca | Perseus II | 66.4 | # | 0 | 0 | 0 | 0 | 60 | 46.0 | 172.4 | # | 1298.2 |
| 11 | Spain | Jaime Matossian | New Venture | 67.4 | # | 0 | 0 | 0 | 0 | 60 | | RT | | 1298.2 |
| 12 | Italy | Lara Villata | Rubber Ball | 70.2 | | 0 | 0 | 0 | 0 | 100 | | RT | | 3000.0 |
| 12 | Italy | Giacomo Della Chiesa | Tokyo Joe | 69.8 | # | 0 | 0 | 0 | | | | RT | | 3000.0 |
| 12 | Italy | Andrea Verdina | Donnizetti | 56.2 | # | | | | | | | WD | | 3000.0 |
| 12 | Italy | Fabio Magni | Cool'N'Breezy | 44.4 | # | | | | | | | WD | | 3000.0 |

=== Dressage, cross country, & jumping (final result) ===
Each team consisted of four pairs of horse and rider. The penalty points of the lowest three pairs were added together to reach the team's penalty points.

| Rank | NOC | Rider | Horse | Dressage | Scored | A | B | | C | D | | Dressage+ Jumping | Scored | Jumping | | Scored | Final | Team Penalties |
| Rank | NOC | Rider | Horse | Dressage | Scored | A | Jump | Time | C | Jump | Time | Dressage+ Jumping | Scored | Jump | Time | Scored | Final | Team Penalties |
|---|---|---|---|---|---|---|---|---|---|---|---|---|---|---|---|---|---|---|
| 1st place, gold medalist(s) | Australia | Andrew Hoy | Darien Powers | 30.6 | # | 0 | 0 | 0 | 0 | 0 | 0 | 30.6 | # | 15 | 0 | # | 45.6 | 146.8 |
| 1st place, gold medalist(s) | Australia | Phillip Dutton | House Doctor | 46.0 | # | 0 | 0 | 0 | 0 | 0 | 1.6 | 47.6 | # | 15 | 1.0 | | 63.6 | 146.8 |
| 1st place, gold medalist(s) | Australia | Stuart Tinney | Jeepster | 36.0 | # | 0 | 0 | 0 | 0 | 0 | 0 | 36.0 | # | 5 | 0 | # | 41.0 | 146.8 |
| 1st place, gold medalist(s) | Australia | Matt Ryan | Kibah Sandstone | 47.8 | | 0 | 0 | 0 | 0 | 0 | 0.4 | 48.2 | | 10 | 2.0 | # | 60.2 | 146.8 |
| 2nd place, silver medalist(s) | Great Britain | Jeanette Brakewell | Over To You | 50.6 | | 0 | 0 | 0 | 0 | 0 | 0 | 50.6 | # | 5 | 6.0 | # | 61.6 | 161.0 |
| 2nd place, silver medalist(s) | Great Britain | Leslie Law | Shear H2O | 44.0 | # | 0 | 0 | 0 | 0 | 0 | 0 | 44.0 | # | 10 | 0 | # | 54.0 | 161.0 |
| 2nd place, silver medalist(s) | Great Britain | Pippa Funnell | Supreme Rock | 32.0 | # | 0 | 0 | 0 | 0 | 0 | 0.4 | 32.4 | # | 10 | 3.0 | # | 45.4 | 161.0 |
| 2nd place, silver medalist(s) | Great Britain | Ian Stark | Jaybee | 39.2 | # | 0 | 0 | 0 | 0 | 80.0 | 17.2 | 136.4 | | | | | WD | 161.0 |
| 3rd place, bronze medalist(s) | United States | David O'Connor | Giltedge | 44.4 | # | 0 | 0 | 0 | 0 | 0 | 2.4 | 46.8 | # | 0 | 0 | # | 46.8 | 175.8 |
| 3rd place, bronze medalist(s) | United States | Nina Fout | 3 Magic Beans | 58.6 | # | 0 | 0 | 2.4 | 0 | 0 | 20.0 | 81.0 | # | 0 | 5.0 | # | 86.0 | 175.8 |
| 3rd place, bronze medalist(s) | United States | Linden Wiesman | Anderoo | 48.4 | # | 0 | 0 | 0 | 0 | 140.0 | | EL | | | | | EL | 175.8 |
| 3rd place, bronze medalist(s) | United States | Karen O'Connor | Prince Panache | 32.6 | # | 0 | 0 | 0 | 0 | 0 | 0.4 | 33.0 | # | 10 | 0 | # | 43.0 | 175.8 |
| 4 | Germany | Marina Köhncke | Sir Toby 4 | 52.4 | # | 0 | 0 | 0 | 0 | 0 | 2.0 | 54.4 | # | 10 | 6.0 | # | 70.4 | 241.8 |
| 4 | Germany | Nele Hagener | Little McMuffin | 65.8 | | 0 | 0 | 0 | 0 | 100.0 | 81.6 | 247.4 | | 15 | 0 | | 262.4 | 241.8 |
| 4 | Germany | Andreas Dibowski | Leonas Dancer | 61.8 | # | 0 | 0 | 0 | 0 | 60.0 | 8.4 | 130.2 | # | 0 | 0 | # | 130.2 | 241.8 |
| 4 | Germany | Ingrid Klimke | Sleep Late | 36.2 | # | 0 | 0 | 0 | 0 | 0 | 0 | 36.2 | # | 5 | 0 | # | 41.2 | 241.8 |
| 5 | Ireland | Susan Shortt | Joy Of My Heart | 69.6 | | 0 | 0 | 0 | 0 | 0 | 0.4 | 70.0 | # | 10 | 0 | # | 80.0 | 270.0 |
| 5 | Ireland | Patricia Donegan-Ryan | Don't Step Back | 54.2 | # | 0 | 0 | 0 | 0 | 0 | 11.6 | 65.8 | # | 0 | 0 | # | 65.8 | 270.0 |
| 5 | Ireland | Nicola Cassidy | Mr Mullins | 59.2 | # | 0 | 0 | 0 | 0 | 40.0 | 20.0 | 119.2 | | 5 | 0 | # | 124.2 | 270.0 |
| 5 | Ireland | Virginia McGrath | The Yellow Earl | 62.4 | # | 0 | 0 | 0 | 0 | 20.0 | 21.2 | 103.6 | # | 25 | 11.0 | | 139.6 | 270.0 |
| 6 | Brazil | Serguei Fofanoff | Sanderston | 72.2 | # | 0 | 0 | 0 | 0 | 40.0 | 82.0 | 194.2 | | 10 | 12.0 | | 216.2 | 333.0 |
| 6 | Brazil | Vicente de Araújo Neto | Teveri | 87.2 | | 0 | 0 | 2.4 | 0 | 0 | 25.2 | 114.8 | # | 10 | 0 | # | 124.8 | 333.0 |
| 6 | Brazil | Éder Gustavo Pagoto | Amazonia | 77.2 | # | 0 | 0 | 0 | 0 | 0 | 5.6 | 82.8 | # | 35 | 11.0 | # | 128.8 | 333.0 |
| 6 | Brazil | Guto de Faria | Hunefer | 65.6 | # | 0 | 0 | 0 | 0 | 0 | 2.8 | 68.4 | # | 5 | 6.0 | # | 79.4 | 333.0 |
| 7 | Spain | Enrique Sarasola Jr. | Super Djarvis | 65.8 | # | 60 | 0 | 0 | 0 | 0 | 0 | 125.8 | # | 25 | 14.0 | # | 164.8 | 1341.2 |
| 7 | Spain | Ramon Beca | Perseus II | 66.4 | # | 0 | 0 | 0 | 0 | 60 | 46.0 | 172.4 | # | 0 | 4.0 | # | 176.4 | 1341.2 |
| 7 | Spain | Jaime Matossian | New Venture | 67.4 | # | 0 | 0 | 0 | 0 | 60 | | RT | | | | | RT | 1341.2 |
| 8 | New Zealand | Mark Todd | Diamond Hall Re | 58.6 | | 0 | 0 | 0 | 0 | 0 | 0 | 58.6 | # | 5 | 2.0 | # | 65.6 | 2065.6 |
| 8 | New Zealand | Paul O'Brien | Enzed | 51.0 | # | 0 | 0 | 0 | 0 | 40.0 | 17.2 | 110.6 | | | | | WD | 2065.6 |
| 8 | New Zealand | Blyth Tait | Ready Teddy | 52.0 | # | 0 | 0 | 0 | 0 | 0 | 0 | 52.0 | # | | | | EL | 2065.6 |
| 8 | New Zealand | Vaughn Jefferis | Bounce | 40.6 | # | 0 | 0 | 0 | 0 | 0 | 0 | 40.6 | # | | | | WD | 2065.6 |
| 9 | Belgium | Constantin van Rijckevorsel | Withcote Nellie | 52.2 | # | 0 | 0 | 0 | 0 | 80.0 | | RT | | | | | RT | 2121.2 |
| 9 | Belgium | Kurt Heyndrickx | Archimedes | 55.2 | # | 0 | 0 | 0 | 0 | 20 | 12.0 | 87.2 | # | 25 | 9.0 | # | 121.2 | 2121.2 |
| 9 | Belgium | Carl Bouckaert | Urbane Des Pins | 53.0 | # | 0 | 0 | 0 | 0 | 100 | 56.8 | 209.8 | # | | | | WD | 2121.2 |
| 9 | Belgium | Karin Donckers | Gormley | 57.2 | # | 0 | | | | | | RT | | | | | RT | 2121.2 |
| 10 | France | Jean-Luc Force | Crocus Jacob | 48.8 | # | 0 | 0 | 0 | 0 | 20 | 4.8 | 73.6 | # | | | | WD | 3000.0 |
| 10 | France | Jean Teulere | Amouncha | 49.8 | # | 0 | 0 | 0 | 0 | 60 | 2.8 | 112.6 | # | | | | WD | 3000.0 |
| 10 | France | Didier Willefert | Blakring | 50.0 | # | 0 | 0 | 0 | 0 | 0 | | RT | | | | | RT | 3000.0 |
| 10 | France | Jean-Lou Bigot | Twist La Beige | 41.6 | # | 0 | 0 | 0 | | | | RT | | | | | RT | 3000.0 |
| 10 | Japan | Shigeyuki Hosono | Urfe Des Landes | 69.8 | | 0 | 0 | 0 | | | | RT | | | | | RT | 3000.0 |
| 10 | Japan | Masaru Fuse | Voyou Du Roc | 51.6 | # | 0 | 0 | 0 | 0 | 80 | 18.8 | 150.4 | # | | | | WD | 3000.0 |
| 10 | Japan | Daisuke Kato | Elusive Warlock | 57.2 | # | 0 | 0 | 0 | 0 | 20 | 24.0 | 101.2 | # | | | | WD | 3000.0 |
| 10 | Japan | Takeaki Tsuchiya | Right on Time | 62.8 | # | 0 | 0 | 0 | | | | RT | | | | | RT | 3000.0 |
| 12 | Italy | Lara Villata | Rubber Ball | 70.2 | | 0 | 0 | 0 | 0 | 100 | | RT | | | | | RT | 3000.0 |
| 12 | Italy | Giacomo Della Chiesa | Tokyo Joe | 69.8 | # | 0 | 0 | 0 | | | | RT | | | | | RT | 3000.0 |
| 12 | Italy | Andrea Verdina | Donnizetti | 56.2 | # | | | | | | | WD | | | | | WD | 3000.0 |
| 12 | Italy | Fabio Magni | Cool'N'Breezy | 44.4 | # | | | | | | | WD | | | | | WD | 3000.0 |

== Sources ==
- Official Report of the 2000 Sydney Summer Olympics available at https://web.archive.org/web/20060622162855/http://www.la84foundation.org/5va/reports_frmst.htm
