= New Zealand at the 1996 Summer Olympics =

- IOC code: NZL
- NOC: New Zealand Olympic Committee
- Website: www.olympic.org.nz

in Atlanta, USA
- Competitors: 97
- Flag bearer: Barbara Kendall
- Officials: 60
- Medals Ranked 26th: Gold 3 Silver 2 Bronze 1 Total 6

Summer Olympics appearances (overview)
- 1908; 1912; 1920; 1924; 1928; 1932; 1936; 1948; 1952; 1956; 1960; 1964; 1968; 1972; 1976; 1980; 1984; 1988; 1992; 1996; 2000; 2004; 2008; 2012; 2016; 2020; 2024; 2028

Other related appearances
- Australasia (1908–1912)

New Zealand competed at the 1996 Summer Olympics in Atlanta, United States. The New Zealand Olympic Committee was represented by 97 athletes and 60 officials. Former Olympic swimmer Dave Gerrard was the team's chef de mission.

== Medal tables ==
Medal	Name	Sport	Event	Date
Gold	Danyon Loader	Swimming	Men's 200 m freestyle	20 July
Gold	Danyon Loader	Swimming	Men's 400 m freestyle	23 July
Gold	Blyth Tait	Equestrian	Individual eventing	26 July
Silver	Sally Clark	Equestrian	Individual eventing	26 July
Silver	Barbara Kendall	Sailing	Women's Mistral	2 August
Bronze	Vaughn Jefferis; Vicky Latta; Andrew Nicholson; Blyth Tait	Equestrian	Team eventing	24 July

Medals by sport
Sport	Gold medal	Silver medal	Bronze medal	Total
Swimming	2	0	0	2
Equestrian	1	1	1	3
Sailing	0	1	0	1
Total	3	2	1	6

Medals by gender
Gender	Gold medal	Silver medal	Bronze medal	Total
Male	2	0	0	2
Female	0	1	0	1
Mixed / open	1	1	1	3
Total	3	2	1	6

== Archery ==
New Zealand sent only one archer to Atlanta. He was defeated in the first round.

Athlete	Event	Ranking round		Round of 64	Round of 32	Round of 16	Quarterfinal	Semifinal	Final	Rank
Athlete	Event	Points	Rank	Opposition Result	Opposition Result	Opposition Result	Opposition Result	Opposition Result	Opposition Result	Rank
Andrew Lindsay	Men's individual	650	33	Lalremsanga (IND); L 156–160	did not advance					46

== Athletics ==
=== Track and road ===
Athlete	Event	Heat		Quarterfinal		Semifinal		Final	
Athlete	Event	Result	Rank (Note: Ranks given are within the heat)	Result	Rank (Note: Ranks given are within the quarterfinal)	Result	Rank (Note: Ranks given are within the semifinal)	Result	Rank
Craig Barrett	Men's 50 km walk	—N/a						4:15:15	33
Nyla Carroll	Women's 10,000 m	32:50.64	10	—N/a				did not advance	
Matthew Coad	Men's 200 m	21.25	5	did not advance					
Chris Donaldson	Men's 100 m	10.39	6	did not advance					
Chris Donaldson	Men's 200 m	20.96	6	did not advance					
Anne Hare	Women's 5000 m	15:22.31	6 Q	—N/a				15:29.11	13
Martin Johns	Men's 1500 m	3:44.91	11	—N/a		did not advance			
Robbie Johnston	Men's 10,000 m	28:40.60	12	—N/a				did not advance	
Mark Keddell	Men's 200 m	20.93	4	did not advance					
Lorraine Moller	Women's marathon	—N/a						2:42:21	46
Scott Nelson	Men's 20 km walk	—N/a						1:25:50	32
Gus Nketia	Men's 100 m	10.34	4 q	10.35	8	did not advance			
Sean Wade	Men's marathon	—N/a						2:30:35	83
Jonathan Wyatt	Men's 5000 m	13:52.56	8 Q	—N/a		13:47.81	10	did not advance	

=== Field ===
Athlete	Event	Qualification		Final	
Athlete	Event	Result	Rank	Result	Rank
Chantal Brunner	Women's long jump	6.62	10 q	6.49	10
Beatrice Faumuina	Women's discus throw	58.40	23	did not advance	
Gavin Lovegrove	Men's javelin throw	77.12	23	did not advance	

=== Combined ===
Athlete	Event	100 m	Long jump	Shot put	High jump	400 m	110 m hurdles	Discus throw	Pole vault	Javelin throw	1500 m	Total points	Rank
Doug Pirini	Men's decathlon	10.89; 885 pts	7.33; 893 pts	14.75; 774 pts	1.89; 705 pts	48.56; 882 pts	14.88; 864 pts	45.34; 774 pts	4.60; 790 pts	58.02; 708 pts	4:39.09; 686 pts	7961	24

== Badminton ==
New Zealand sent two women to compete in two competitions of the Olympic Badminton tournament.

Athlete	Event	Round of 64	Round of 32	Round of 16	Quarterfinals	Semifinals	Final	Rank
Athlete	Event	Opposition Result	Opposition Result	Opposition Result	Opposition Result	Opposition Result	Opposition Result	Rank
Rhona Robertson	Women's singles	Bye	Martin (DEN); L 2–11 2–11	did not advance				=17
Tammy Jenkins; Rhona Robertson	Women's doubles	—N/a	Deng / Julien (CAN); W 15–7 15–4	Nathanael / Resiana (INA); L 9–15 2–15	did not advance			=9

== Boxing ==
Athlete	Event	Round 1	Round 2	Quarterfinals	Semifinals	Final	Rank
Athlete	Event	Opposition Result	Opposition Result	Opposition Result	Opposition Result	Opposition Result	Rank
Garth da Silva	Men's heavyweight	O'Grady (IRE); W RSC-1	Dychkov (BLR); L 8–12	did not advance			=9

== Canoeing ==
New Zealand sent one man to compete in one canoeing event.

=== Slalom ===
Athlete	Event	Run 1			Run 2			Best total	Rank
Athlete	Event	Time	Points	Total	Time	Points	Total	Best total	Rank
Owen Hughes	Men's K-1	2:34.79	10	164.79	2:35.25	5	160.25	160.25	31

== Cycling ==
=== Road ===
Athlete	Event	Time	Rank
Rebecca Bailey	Women's individual road race	2:37:06	33
Rebecca Bailey	Women's individual time trial	41:45	22
Brian Fowler	Men's individual road race	DNF	
Scott Guyton	Men's individual road race	DNF	
Glen Mitchell	Men's individual road race	DNF	
Jacqui Nelson	Women's individual road race	DNF	
Jacqui Nelson	Women's individual time trial	40:58	20
Susy Pryde	Women's individual road race	2:37:06	31
Rosalind Reekie	Women's individual road race	2:23:52	49
Ric Reid	Men's individual road race	4:56:47	66

=== Track ===
1 km time trial

Athlete	Event	Time	Rank
Darren McKenzie-Potter	Men's 1 km trime trial	1:06.311	14

Points race

Athlete	Event	Points	Laps behind	Rank
Glenn McLeay	Men's points race	8	1	9
Jacqui Nelson	Women's points race	8	0	8

Sprint

Athlete	Event	Qualifying		Round 1	Round 1 repechage	Round 2	Round 2 repechage	Eighth finals	Eighth final repechage	Quarterfinals	Semifinals	Final	Rank
Athlete	Event	Time	Rank	Opposition Result	Opposition Result	Opposition Result	Opposition Result	Opposition Result	Opposition Result	Opposition Result	Opposition Result	Opposition Result	Rank
Darren McKenzie-Potter	Men's sprint	11.211	23 Q	Harnett (CAN); L R	Moreno (ESP); L	did not advance							
Donna Wynd	Women's sprint	11.961	12 Q	Ferris (AUS); L R	Salumäe (EST); Paraskevin-Young (USA); 3	—N/a				did not advance			

Pursuit

Athlete	Event	Qualification		Quarterfinals	Semifinals	Final	Rank
Athlete	Event	Time	Rank	Opposition Time	Opposition Time	Opposition Time	Rank
Gary Anderson	Men's individual pursuit	4:36.918	13	did not advance			13
Sarah Ulmer	Women's individual pursuit	3:43.176	6 Q	McGregor (GBR); L 3:45.761	did not advance		7
Brendon Cameron; Tim Carswell; Julian Dean; Greg Henderson	Men's team pursuit	4:14.990	8 Q	France; L 4:08.965	did not advance		8

=== Mountain bike ===
Mountain biking was introduced as an Olympic discipline for the 1996 Games. The two strongest women, Kathy Lynch and Mary Grigson, gained New Zealand two qualifying positions for the Olympics; no New Zealand men qualified. Grigson accepted an offer to race for Australia—she competed for them at the Olympics in 1996 and 2000—and left New Zealand, so the New Zealand Mountain Bike Association decided to nominate just one competitor for the New Zealand Olympic team.

Athlete	Event	Time	Rank
Kathy Lynch	Women's cross-country	1:57:40	8

== Equestrian ==
=== Eventing ===
New Zealand entered three competitors in the mixed individual eventing event; two men and one woman. New Zealand also competed in team eventing.

Rider	Horse	Event	Dressage		Cross-country		Jumping		Overall	
Rider	Horse	Event	Points	Rank	Points	Rank	Points	Rank	Points	Rank
Sally Clark	Squirrel Hill	Individual	51.2	14	9.20	2	0.00	=1	60.40	2nd place, silver medalist(s)
Andrew Nicholson	Buckley Province	Individual	48.4	11	DNF		Retired			
Blyth Tait	Ready Teddy	Individual	51.60	=15	5.20	1	0.00	=1	56.80	1st place, gold medalist(s)
Vaughn Jefferis; Vicky Latta; Andrew Nicholson; Blyth Tait	Bounce; Broadcast News; Jägermeister II; Chesterfield	Team	135.60	3	120.20	3	12.75	1	268.55	3rd place, bronze medalist(s)

=== Jumping ===
Athlete	Horse	Event	Qualifying					Final	Rank
Athlete	Horse	Event	Round 1	Round 2	Round 3	Total points	Rank	Final	Rank
Daniel Meech	Future Vision	Individual	40.25	12.00	8.00	60.25	69	did not advance	

== Judo ==
Athlete	Event	Elimination pool				Repechage pool			Final / BM	Rank
Athlete	Event	Opponent Result	Opponent Result	Opponent Result	Opponent Result	Opponent Result	Opponent Result	Opponent Result	Opponent Result	Rank
Steve Corkin	Men's lightweight	Huang (TPE); W	Golban (MDA); W	Pereira (BRA); L	Did not advance	—N/a	Gagliano (FRA); L	did not advance		=9
Daniel Gowing	Men's lightweight	Pepic (SVK); W	Traineau (FRA); L	did not advance		Svirid (BLR); W	Nakamura (JPN); L	did not advance		=9

== Rowing ==
New Zealand qualified five boats for the 1996 Summer Olympics: men's single sculls, men's pair, men's coxless four, men's lightweight double sculls, and women's double sculls.

Men

Athlete	Event	Heats		Repechage		Semifinals		Final	
Athlete	Event	Time	Rank	Time	Rank	Time	Rank	Time	Rank
Rob Waddell	Single sculls	7:48.69	4 R	7:42.87	1 SA/B	7:18.52	4 FB	6:49.55	7
Dave Schaper; Toni Dunlop	Coxless pair	6:42.15	3 R	7:04.40	3 SA/B	6:51.64	2 FA	6:29.24	5
Alastair Mackintosh; Ian Wright; Chris White; Scott Brownlee	Coxless four	6:30.03	4 R	6:35.58	4	Did not advance			
Rob Hamill; Mike Rodger	Lightweight double sculls	7:09.61	4 R	6:34.78	4	Did not advance			

Women

Athlete	Event	Heats		Repechage		Semifinals		Final	
Athlete	Event	Time	Rank	Time	Rank	Time	Rank	Time	Rank
Philippa Baker; Brenda Lawson	Double sculls	7:26.83	2 SA/B	Bye		7:15.57	2 FA	7:09.92	6

== Sailing ==
- Aaron McIntosh – Men's Mistral One Design
- Barbara Kendall – Women's Mistral One Design – silver medal
- Craig Monk – Finn
- Sharon Ferris – Europe
- Rohan Cooke & Andrew Stone – Men's 470
- Leslie Egnot & Jan Shearer – Women's 470
- Hamish Pepper – Laser
- Rod Davis & Don Cowie – Star
- Rex Sellers & Brian Jones – Tornado
- Kelvin Harrap & Sean Clarkson & Jamie Gale – Soling

== Shooting ==
Athlete	Event	Qualification rounds								Final round	Total	Rank
Athlete	Event	Round 1	Round 2	Round 3	Round 4	Round 5	Round 6	Total	Rank	Final round	Total	Rank
Stephen Petterson	Men's 50 m rifle prone	99	98	98	100	97	99	591	=36	did not advance		=36
Brant Woodward	Men's trap	24	25	22	24	21	—N/a	116	=42	did not advance		=42

== Swimming ==
Athlete	Event	Heat		Final	
Athlete	Event	Result	Rank	Result	Rank
Dionne Bainbridge	Women's 200 m freestyle	2:02.69	13 QB	2:03.20	15
Dionne Bainbridge	Women's 400 m freestyle	4:16.47	13 QB	4:16.79	14
Trent Bray	Men's 100 m freestyle	51.18	31	did not advance	
Trent Bray	Men's 200 m freestyle	1:51.59	=20	did not advance	
Scott Cameron	Men's 1500 m freestyle	15:56.60	27	did not advance	
Alison Fitch	Women's 50 m freestyle	26.74	35	did not advance	
Alison Fitch	Women's 100 m freestyle	57.71	29	did not advance	
Paul Kent	Men's 100 m breaststroke	1:02.76	15 QB	1:03.05	14
Lydia Lipscombe	Women's 100 m backstroke	1:03.61	13 QB	1:03.30	11
Lydia Lipscombe	Women's 200 m backstroke	2:19.54	24	did not advance	
Danyon Loader	Men's 200 m freestyle	1:48.48	2 Q	1:47.63 NR	1st place, gold medalist(s)
Danyon Loader	Men's 400 m freestyle	3:51.54	4 Q	3:47.97 NR	1st place, gold medalist(s)
Danyon Loader	Men's 100 m butterfly	55.39	34	did not advance	
Danyon Loader	Men's 200 m butterfly	2:00.81	19	did not advance	
Anna Simcic	Women's 200 m backstroke	2:13.74	8 Q	2:14.04	6
Nicholas Tongue	Men's 50 m freestyle	23.73	=40	did not advance	
Anna Wilson	Women's 100 m breaststroke	1:12.93	31	did not advance	
Anna Wilson	Women's 200 m individual medley	2:19.97	25	did not advance	
Anna Wilson	Women's 400 m individual medley	4:55.72	24	did not advance	
Jonathan Winter	Men's 100 m backstroke	56.92	23	did not advance	
John Steel; Nicholas Tongue; Danyon Loader; Trent Bray	Men's 4 × 100 m freestyle relay	3:21.65	9	did not advance	
Trent Bray; Murray Burdan; Scott Cameron; Danyon Loader	Men's 4 × 200 m freestyle relay	7:24.35	9	did not advance	
Jonathan Winter; Paul Kent; Danyon Loader; Trent Bray	Men's 4 × 100 m medley relay	3:45.80	14	did not advance	
Sarah Catherwood; Alison Fitch; Anna Wilson; Dionne Bainbridge	Women's 4 × 200 m freestyle relay	8:14.98	11	did not advance	
Lydia Lipscombe; Anna Wilson; Anna Simcic; Alison Fitch	Women's 4 × 100 m medley relay	4:19.83	19	did not advance	

== Table tennis ==
Athlete	Event	Pool stage						Round of 16	Quarterfinals	Semifinals	Final	Rank
Athlete	Event	Opposition Result	Opposition Result	Opposition Result	W	L	Rank	Opposition Result	Opposition Result	Opposition Result	Opposition Result	Rank
Chunli Li	Women's singles	Arisi (ITA); W 2–0	Chouaib (LIB); W 2–0	Chen (TPE); L 0–2	2	1	2	did not advance				=17

== Tennis ==
Athlete	Event	Round of 64	Round of 32	Round of 16	Quarterfinals	Semifinals	Final	Rank
Athlete	Event	Opposition Result	Opposition Result	Opposition Result	Opposition Result	Opposition Result	Opposition Result	Rank
Brett Steven	Men's singles	Boetsch (FRA); L 2–6 7–6 2–6	did not advance					=33

== Volleyball ==
=== Beach volleyball ===
Athlete	Event	Winners' bracket				Losers' bracket					Semifinals	Final	Rank
Athlete	Event	Round 1	Round 2	Round 3	Round 4	Round 1	Round 2	Round 3	Round 4	Round 5	Semifinals	Final	Rank
Athlete	Event	Opposition Result	Opposition Result	Opposition Result	Opposition Result	Opposition Result	Opposition Result	Opposition Result	Opposition Result	Opposition Result	Opposition Result	Opposition Result	Rank
Glenn Hamilton; Reid Hamilton	Men's tournament	Ghiurghi / Grigolo (ITA); L 8–15	Relegated to losers' bracket			Prosser / Zahner (AUS); L 8–15	did not advance						=17
