= Anna Wilson (swimmer) =

New Zealand swimmer (born 1977)

Personal information
- Birth name: Anna Louise Wilson
- Born: 1 May 1977 (age 48); Iowa City, Iowa, USA

Sport
- Country: New Zealand
- Sport: Swimming

Anna Louise Wilson (born 1 May 1977) is a United States-born Olympic swimmer from New Zealand.

== Biography ==
Wilson was born in 1977 in Iowa City in the U.S. state of Iowa. Wilson, Elizabeth Van Welie, Scott Cameron, and Danyon Loader all trained under swimming coach Duncan Laing at Moana Pool in Dunedin, New Zealand, at the same time. In 1991, she set an Otago record in 100 m freestyle that would stand for 20 years. In 1993, she set an Otago senior women's record in 1500 m freestyle that would stand until 2009. In 1995, she set a national women's aged 17 100 m breaststroke record; it stood for 18 years until it was broken by Natasha Lloyd in 2013. Wilson's Otago 100 m individual medley women's open record stood until broken in 2012. As of 2016, she still holds four national age group records.

Wilson represented New Zealand at the 1994 Commonwealth Games in Victoria, British Columbia, Canada, in six events. She placed 4th in the 400 individual medley which qualified her for the 1994 World Championships in Rome, Italy. At the 1994 World Aquatics Championships she placed 2nd in the B final of the 400 individual medley or 10th overall.

Wilson was one of the 14 swimmers who represented New Zealand at the 1996 Summer Olympics in Atlanta, United States. She qualified in 6 events and her time at the NZ trials in the 400 individual medley would have placed her 2nd at the US Olympic trials that year. Wilson was in a team with Dionne Bainbridge, Sarah Catherwood, and Alison Fitch to compete in the 4 × 200 metre freestyle relay. They came fifth in their heat and did not qualify for the final; their overall placement was 11th out of 21 teams. In the 100 metre breaststroke, she came 31st out of 46 competitors. In the 200 metre individual medley, she came 25th out of 43 competitors. In the 400 metre individual medley, she came 24th out of 31 competitors. Wilson was in a team with Lydia Lipscombe, Anna Simcic, and Alison Fitch to compete in the 4 × 100 metre medley relay. They came sixth in their heat and did not qualify for the final; their overall placement was 19th out of 24 teams. Wilson is New Zealand Olympian number 747.

Wilson's portrait is included on the wall of fame at Moana Pool. She is in the Hall of Fame at Swimming New Zealand.
