= Armenians in Spain =

Total population
- 40,000

Regions with significant populations
- Valencia (14,000); Barcelona (12,000); Madrid (8,000)

Languages
- Armenian, Spanish

Religion
- Majority Armenian Apostolic Church; Armenian Catholic · Armenian Evangelical

Related ethnic groups
- Armenian, Hamshenis, Cherkesogai groups

Armenians in Spain (Armenian: Հայերն Իսպանիայում, romanized: Hayern Ispaniayum; Spanish: Armenios en España) refers to ethnic Armenians living in Spain. They number around 40,000, centred in Valencia, Barcelona, and Madrid. Spain was the fourth most popular country of destination for emigrating Armenians in 2011.

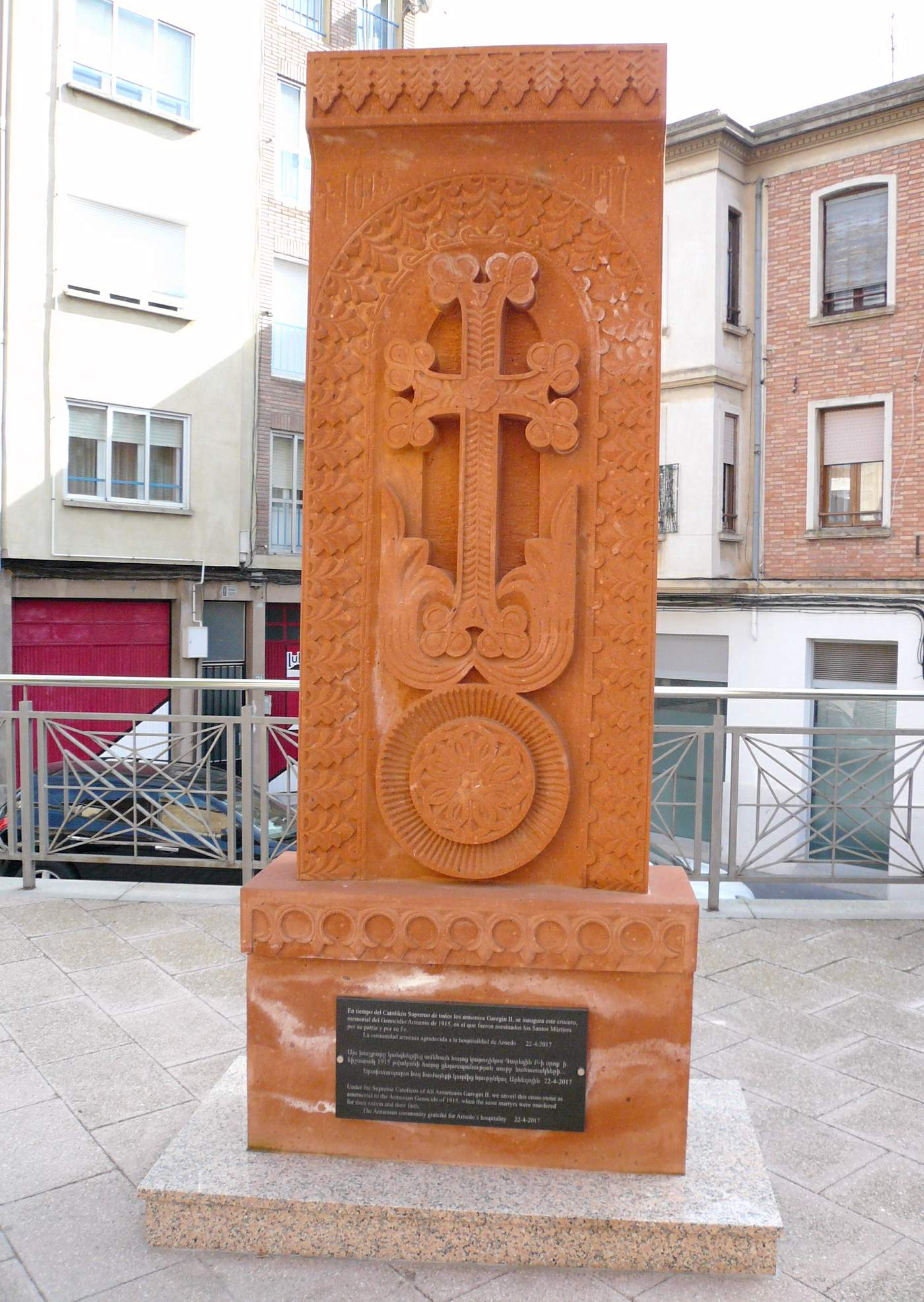
Armenian Genocide memorial, Arnedo

Before 2009, there were no Armenian churches in Spain, until one was opened in a small town near Barcelona in August that year. Most Armenians in Spain belong to the Armenian Apostolic Church. The number of Armenian Sunday schools in Spain is on the rise.

Most Armenians speak Armenian and Spanish. Much emigration from Armenia following dissolution of the Soviet Union has been directed to the EU, including Spain, along with Russia and the United States.

== History ==
Even if the presence of individual Armenians in the territory of current-day Spain dates back at least to the Middle Ages, their number increased in the early modern period, settling from the 16th century on in main trading cities such as Seville or Cádiz, attracted to the increasing commercial activity in the realms of the Hispanic Monarchy, playing an important role in the Persian silk trade. Despite an early social and commercial success, their reputation deteriorated in the 17th century for a number of reasons, including the preponderance over the import of cheap fabrics exerted by Armenian merchants, the strife of Spanish Crown-funded Franciscans against other Christian groups for control over the Holy Places, and some got likewise to the point of accusing local Armenians of covert allegiances to the Sublime Porte.

== Notable people ==
- Garik Israelian
- Hovik Keuchkerian
- Jaime Matossian
- Ara Malikian

== See also ==
- Armenia–Spain relations
- Lebanese people in Spain
