= Paepke =

Paepke, Päpke is a surname. Notable people with the surname include:

- Dennis Paepke (born 1946), American baseball player
- Jack Paepke (1922–2014), American baseball player, manager, and scout

== See also ==
- Paepcke
