= Kurt Heyndrickx =

Belgian equestrian (born 1972)

Personal information
- Nationality: Belgian
- Born: 30 August 1972 (age 53) Sint-Niklaas, Belgium

Sport
- Sport: Equestrian
Medal record
Equestrian
Representing Belgium
European Championships
Bronze medal – third place	1999 Luhmühlen	Team eventing

Kurt Heyndrickx (born 30 August 1972) is a Belgian equestrian. He competed in the team eventing at the 2000 Summer Olympics.
