= Nicola Cassidy =

Irish equestrian

Personal information
- Nationality: Irish
- Born: 9 December 1955 (age 69); Dublin, Ireland

Sport
- Sport: Equestrian

Nicola Cassidy (born 9 December 1955) is an Irish equestrian. She competed in the team eventing at the 2000 Summer Olympics.
