= Nina Fout =

American equestrian

Personal information
- Born: June 23, 1959 (age 67) Washington, D.C.
Medal record
Equestrian
Representing the United States
Olympic Games
Bronze medal – third place	2000 Sydney	Team eventing

Nina Fout (born June 23, 1959, in Washington, D.C.) is an American equestrian. She won a bronze medal in team eventing at the 2000 Summer Olympics in Sydney, together with Karen O'Connor, David O'Connor and Linden Wiesman.
