= Mara DePuy =

American equestrian

Personal information
- Nationality: American
- Born: July 30, 1973 (age 52)

Sport
- Sport: Equestrian
Medal record
Equestrian
Representing the United States
Pan American Games
| Silver medal – second place | 1995 Mar del Plata | Team eventing |

Mara DePuy (born July 30, 1973) is an American equestrian. She competed in the individual eventing at the 1996 Summer Olympics.
