= Dionne Bainbridge =

New Zealand swimmer (born 1978)

Personal information
- Born: Dionne Estelle Bainbridge; 18 March 1978 (age 48) Auckland, New Zealand

Sport
- Country: New Zealand
- Sport: Swimming

Dionne Estelle Bainbridge (later Coluccio; born 18 March 1978) is an Olympic swimmer from New Zealand.

Bainbridge was born in 1978 in Auckland, New Zealand. Bainbridge was one of the 14 swimmers who represented New Zealand at the 1996 Summer Olympics in Atlanta, United States, and she competed at three events. Bainbridge was in a team with Anna Wilson, Sarah Catherwood, and Alison Fitch to compete in the 4 × 200 metre freestyle relay. They came fifth in their heat and did not qualify for the final; their overall placement was 11th out of 21 teams. In the 200 metre freestyle, she qualified for the B final and came 15th out of 42 competitors. In the 400 metre freestyle, she qualified for the B final and came 14th out of 39 competitors.

Bainbridge is New Zealand Olympian number 690. When Barry Maister as head of the New Zealand Olympic Committee (NZOC) had the project of honouring the country's Olympic competitors, Bainbridge was among the last nine individuals that the NZOC had yet to track down.
