= Éder Gustavo Pagoto =

Brazilian equestrian

Personal information
- Born: 10 May 1973 (age 51); Pirassununga, Brazil

Sport
- Sport: Equestrian

Éder Gustavo Pagoto (born 10 May 1973) is a Brazilian equestrian. He competed in the team eventing at the 2000 Summer Olympics.
