= Nele Hagener =

German equestrian

Personal information
- Nationality: German
- Born: 6 February 1976 (age 50) Hamburg, West Germany

Sport
- Sport: Equestrian
Medal record
Equestrian
Representing Germany
European Championships
Silver medal – second place	1999 Luhmühlen	Team eventing

Nele Hagener (born 6 February 1976) is a German equestrian. She competed in the team eventing at the 2000 Summer Olympics.
