= Vicente de Araújo Neto =

Brazilian equestrian

Personal information
- Born: 1 October 1966 (age 58); Belo Horizonte, Brazil

Sport
- Sport: Equestrian

Vicente de Araújo Neto (born 1 October 1966) is a Brazilian equestrian. He competed in the team eventing at the 2000 Summer Olympics.
