= Fredrik Jönsson =

Swedish equestrian (born 1972)

Personal information
- Nationality: Swedish
- Born: 6 October 1972 (age 53) Stockholm, Sweden

Sport
- Sport: Equestrian
Medal record
Equestrian
Representing Sweden
World Championships
Silver medal – second place	2018 Tryon	Team jumping

Fredrik Jönsson (born 6 October 1972) is a Swedish equestrian. He competed in the individual eventing at the 1996 Summer Olympics.
