= Roberta Gentini =

Italian equestrian

Personal information
- Nationality: Italian
- Born: 8 August 1973 (age 51); Novara, Italy

Sport
- Sport: Equestrian

Roberta Gentini (born 8 August 1973) is an Italian former equestrian. She competed in the individual eventing at the 1996 Summer Olympics.
