= Paul O'Brien (equestrian) =

New Zealand equestrian

Personal information
- Nationality: New Zealand
- Born: 16 July 1968 (age 56); Takapuna, New Zealand

Sport
- Sport: Equestrian
- Event: Eventing

Paul O'Brien (born 16 July 1968) is a New Zealand equestrian. He competed in the team eventing at the 2000 Summer Olympics. He is gay.
