= Stuart Tinney =

Australian equestrian (born 1964)

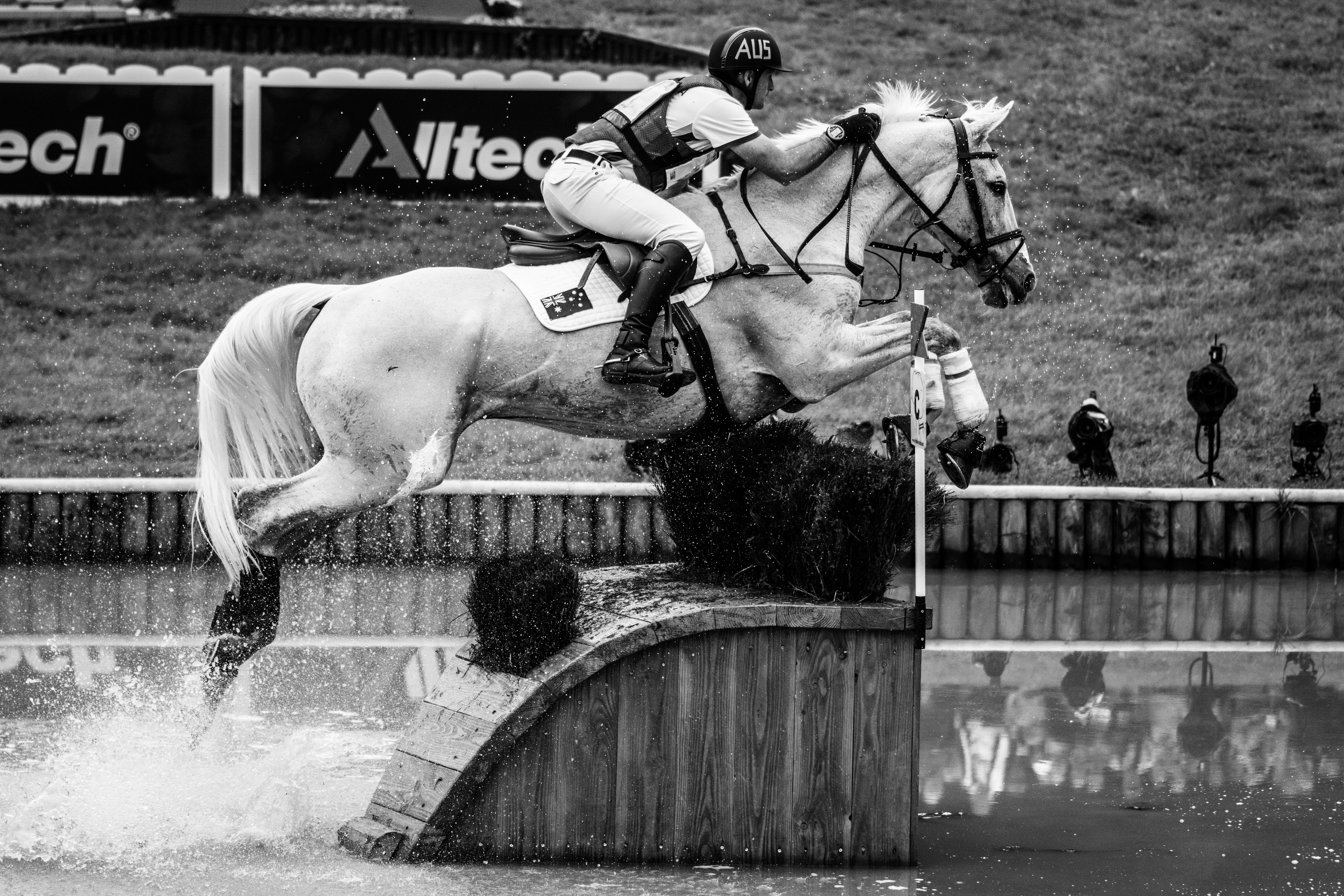
- Stuart Tinney riding Pluto Mio at the 2014 World Equestrian Games

Personal information
- Born: 7 December 1964 (age 61) Mundubbera, Australia
Medal record
Equestrian
Representing Australia
Olympic Games
Gold medal – first place	2000 Sydney	Team eventing
Bronze medal – third place	2016 Rio de Janeiro	Team eventing

Stuart Brian Tinney, OAM (born 7 December 1964 in Mundubbera) is an Olympic-level equestrian rider, who competes for Australia. He won a team gold medal at the 2000 Summer Olympics, a team bronze medal at the 2016 Summer Olympics, and also competed at the 2004 Summer Olympics.

Tinney competed at four World Equestrian Games (in 1998, 2002, 2010 and 2014). He finished 4th in the team eventing competition at the 2002 World Games. His best individual placement is 8th place from 2010.

In 2008, Tinney competed in Europe in an attempt to make selection for the Beijing Olympics, but did not make the Australian team. In 2009, Tinney won the Olympic level CCI**** class at the Australian International 3 day event with Vettori. He also came 7th with Ari de Gwaihier. The Australian International 3 day event is one of only 6 CCI**** competitions in the world and the only one on the Southern Hemisphere.

After 12 years of absence, Tinney made his Olympic return in 2016, when he won a team bronze medal and placed 22nd individually.

Tinney received an Australian Sports Medal and a Medal of the Order of Australia in 2001 for his 2000 gold medal. He was inducted into the Sport Australia Hall of Fame in 2003.

== Notable horses ==
- Jeepster – 1987 Bay Gelding
  - 1998 World Equestrian Games – Individual Ninth Place
  - 2000 Sydney Olympics – Team Gold Medal
  - 2004 Athens Olympics – Team Sixth Place, Individual 38th Place
- Ava – 1992 Bay Mare (Aachen)
  - 2002 World Equestrian Games – Team Fourth Place, Individual 16th Place
- Vettori – 1996 Gray Warmblood Cross Gelding (Voltaire)
  - 2009 Adelaide CCI**** Winner
  - 2010 World Equestrian Games – Individual Eighth Place
- Panamera – 1999 Bay Warmblood Mare (Staccato x Lunchtime)
  - 2011 Adelaide CCI****Winner
- Pluto Mio – 1998 Gray Hanoverian/Thoroughbred Gelding (Daley K x Al Mundhir)
  - 2014 World Equestrian Games – Individual 11th Place
  - 2016 Rio Olympics – Team Bronze Medal, Individual 22nd Place
