= Guto de Faria =

Brazilian equestrian

Personal information
- Born: 11 March 1975 (age 50); São Paulo, Brazil

Sport
- Sport: Equestrian

Guto de Faria (born 11 March 1975) is a Brazilian equestrian. He competed in the team eventing at the 2000 Summer Olympics.
