= Charlotte Bathe =

British equestrian

Personal information
- Nationality: British
- Born: 22 December 1965 (age 60) Ipswich, England

Sport
- Sport: Equestrian
Medal record
Equestrian
Representing Great Britain
World Championships
| Gold medal – first place | 1994 The Hague | Team eventing |
European Championships
| Gold medal – first place | 1995 Pratoni del Vivaro | Team eventing |

Charlotte Bathe (born 22 September 1965) is a British equestrian. She competed in the individual eventing at the 1996 Summer Olympics.
