= Juan Carlos Candisano =

Argentine equestrian (born 1966)

Personal information
- Nationality: Argentine
- Born: 19 April 1966 (age 59)

Sport
- Sport: Equestrian

Juan Carlos Candisano (born 19 April 1966) is an Argentine equestrian. He competed in the individual eventing at the 1996 Summer Olympics.
