= Paepcke =

Paepcke, Päpcke is a surname. Notable people with the surname include:

- Elizabeth Paepcke (1902–1994), American philanthropist and promoter, wife of Walter
- Walter Paepcke (1896–1960), American industrialist and philanthropist

== See also ==
- Hendrik von Paepcke (born 1974), a German equestrian
