= Kerry Millikin =

American equestrian

Personal information
- Born: December 10, 1961 (age 64)
- Website: kerrymillikin.com
Medal record
Equestrian
Representing the United States
Olympic Games
Bronze medal – third place	1996 Atlanta	Individual eventing
World Championships
Bronze medal – third place	1998 Rome	Team eventing
Pan American Games
Gold medal – first place	1999 Winnipeg	Team eventing

Kerry Millikin (born December 10, 1961) is an American equestrian and Olympic medalist. She won a bronze medal in eventing at the 1996 Summer Olympics in Atlanta.
