= Chris Hunnable =

British equestrian

Personal information
- Nationality: British
- Born: 19 March 1964 (age 61); Braintree, England

Sport
- Sport: Equestrian

Chris Hunnable (born 19 March 1964) is a British former equestrian. He competed in the individual eventing at the 1996 Summer Olympics.
