= Sarah Catherwood =

New Zealand swimmer (born 1980)

Personal information
- Born: Sarah Louise Catherwood; 23 May 1980 (age 46) Christchurch, New Zealand
- Height: 177 cm (5 ft 10 in)

Sport
- Country: New Zealand
- Sport: Swimming

Sarah Louise Catherwood (for a time known as Sarah Jackson, born 23 May 1980) is an Olympic swimmer from New Zealand.

== Swimming career ==
Catherwood started swimming aged eight and was a teen swimming sensation; as of 2011, one of her national age 13 records still stood. She was a member of Christchurch's AquaGym Swim Club alongside Anna Simcic.

Catherwood was one of the 14 swimmers who represented New Zealand at the 1996 Summer Olympics in Atlanta, United States, and she competed at one event. Aged 16, she was the youngest New Zealand swimmer in Atlanta. Catherwood was in a team with Anna Wilson, Dionne Bainbridge, and Alison Fitch to compete in the 4 × 200 metre freestyle relay. They came fifth in their heat and did not qualify for the final; their overall placement was 11th out of 21 teams. Catherwood is New Zealand Olympian number 698.

Catherwood retired after competing at the 2004 FINA World short course swimming championships in Indianapolis, USA. She improved her personal best time in 100 metres freestyle by over half a second at those championships.

In 2011 at age 30, Catherwood decided to try a comeback, with Olympic teammate Paul Kent as her trainer. At the time, she was based in Palmerston North. She later pursued her swimming career as a member of Roskill Magic, a swimming club in the Auckland suburb of Mount Roskill.

== Private life ==
Catherwood was born in 1980 in Christchurch, New Zealand. She moved to Palmerston North in 2008 to study a veterinary degree at Massey University. After that, she moved to Auckland. Outside of swimming, Catherwood's passion is horses.
