= Artemus de Almeida =

Brazilian equestrian (born 1969)

Personal information
- Nationality: Brazilian
- Born: 9 May 1969 (age 57) Americana, Brazil

Sport
- Sport: Equestrian
Medal record
Equestrian
Representing Brazil
Pan American Games
Silver medal – second place	1999 Winnipeg	Team eventing

Artemus de Almeida (born 9 May 1969) is a Brazilian equestrian. He competed in the individual eventing at the 1996 Summer Olympics.
