= Armenia–Spain relations =

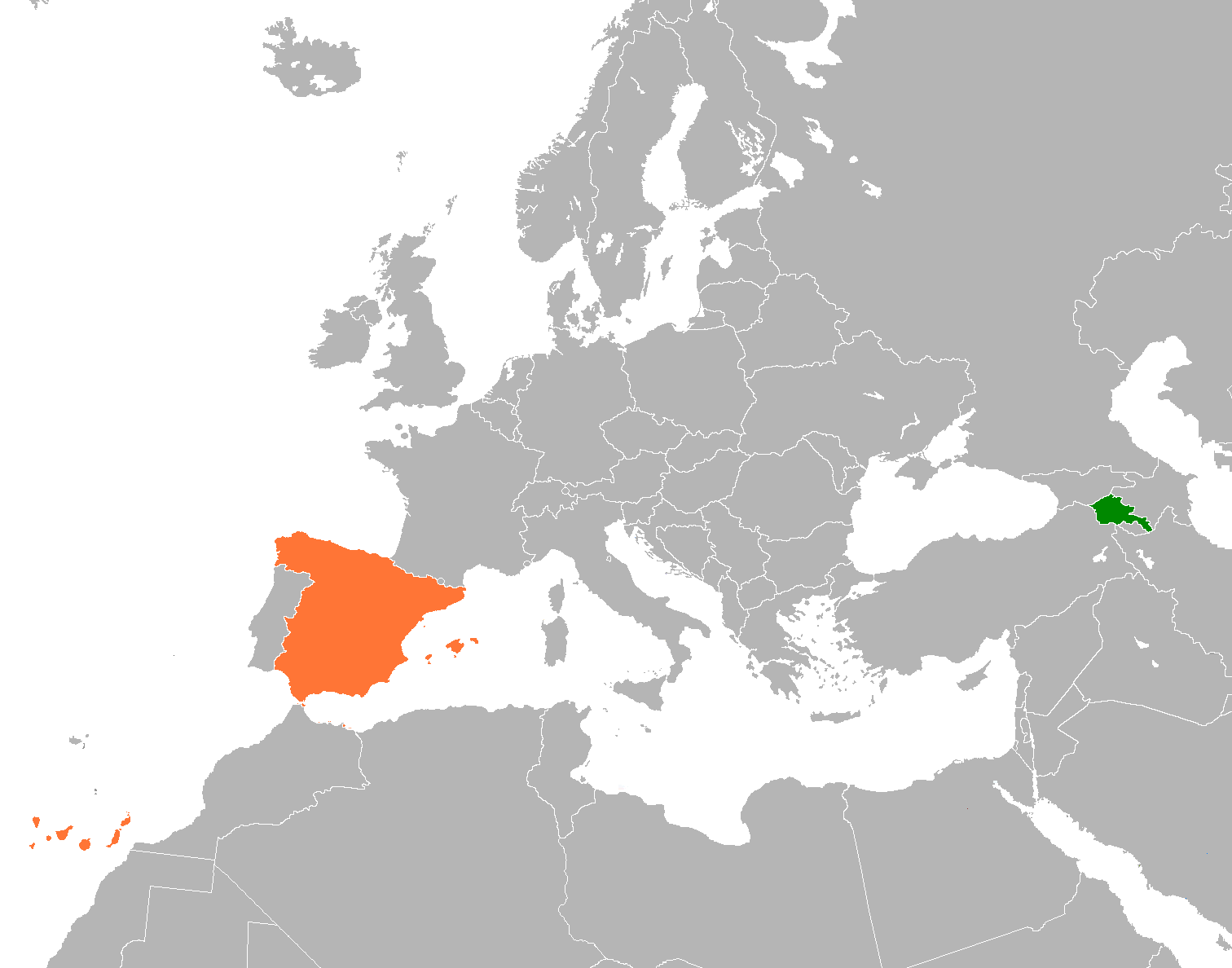

- Armenia: Spain

Armenia–Spain relations are the bilateral relations between Armenia and Spain. The importance of relations centers on the history of Armenians migration to Spain. Approximately 40,000 Armenians and their descendants reside in Spain. Both nations are members of the Council of Europe and the OSCE.

== History ==
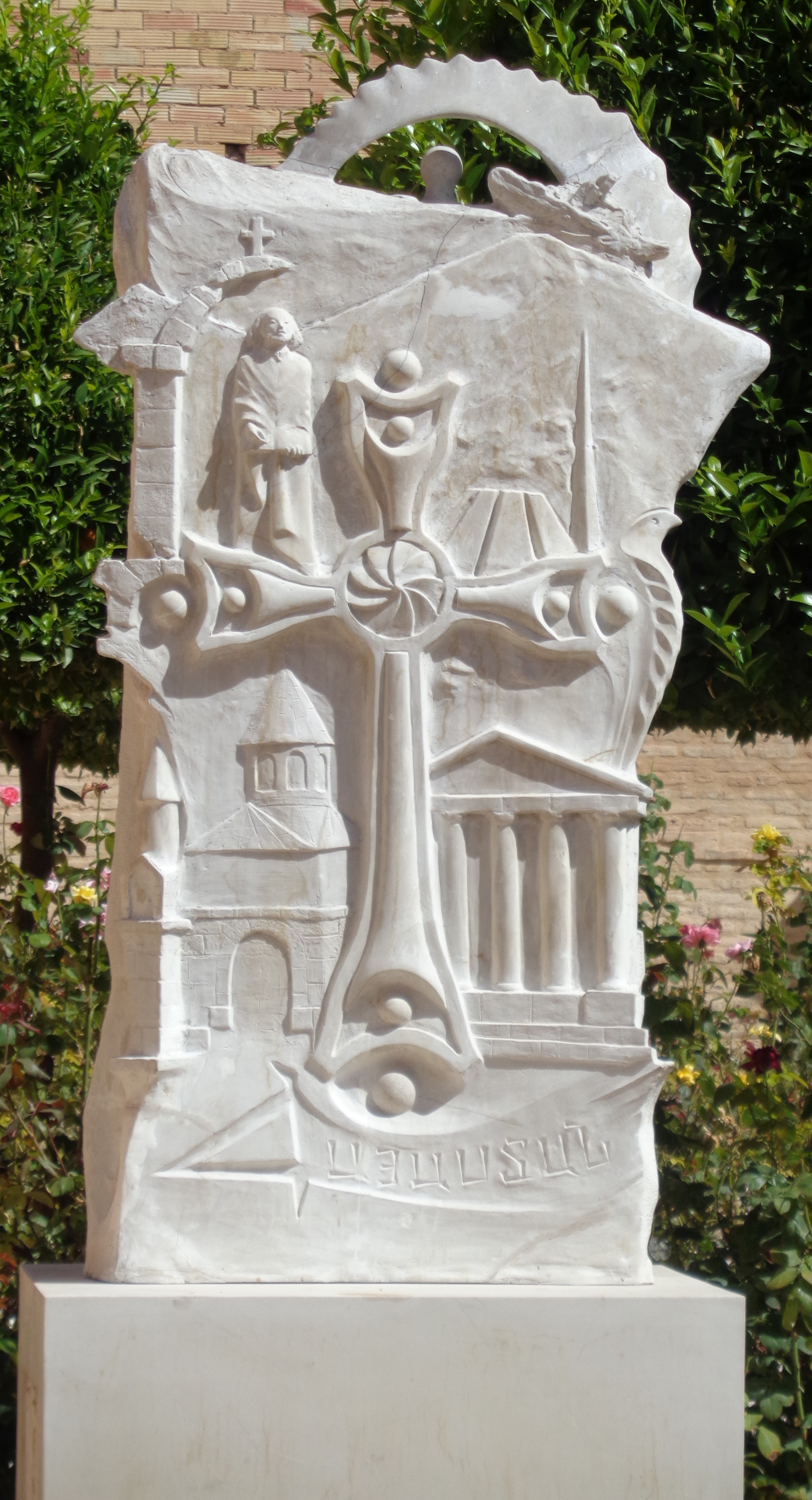
Memorial to the Armenian genocide in Mislata.

=== Early relations ===
The first initial contact between Armenia and Spain took place in 1382 when deposed King Leo V from the Armenian Kingdom of Cilicia arrived to Spain seeking assistance from Spanish King John I of Castile to regain his kingdom. In Spain, Leo V received the title of Lord of Madrid and stayed in Spain until 1390 when King John I of Castile died. Throughout the centuries, Armenians arrived to Spain escaping war and uncertainties in their home country. Some Armenians partook in the age of exploration for Spain in the late 1400s and early 1500s.

During the Armenian genocide in 1915, most Armenians did not travel to Spain, but instead went to either France or former Spanish territories of Argentina and Uruguay. On 26 December 1991, Armenia regained independence after the Dissolution of the Soviet Union. On 27 May 1992, Armenia and Spain established diplomatic relations.

=== Modern relations ===
Bilateral relations can be considered excellent but still scarce. Since independence, over 20,000 Armenians have immigrated to Spain. In 2003, Spain opened an honorary consulate in Yerevan. In August 2010, Armenia opened a resident embassy in Madrid. In recent years, many Spanish cities and six Spanish autonomous communities (Aragon, Balearic Islands, Basque Country, Catalonia, La Rioja, and Navarre) have recognized the Armenian genocide. In 2010, a memorial was erected in Mislata, Valencia, the first monument commemorating the Armenian genocide in Spain.

In October 17, 2023, the Spanish Senate adopted an official declaration condemning the military operation carried out by Azerbaijan authorities “against the Armenian population of Nagorno-Karabakh that has led to the death of hundreds of Armenians and the mass exodus of thousands of people”.

== High-level visits ==
High-level visits from Armenia to Spain

- Foreign Minister Miguel Ángel Moratinos (June 2007 & March 2010)
- Foreign Minister José Manuel García-Margallo (April 2014)

High-level visits from Spain to Armenia

- Foreign Minister Vartan Oskanian (November 2000 & November 2007)
- Foreign Minister Eduard Nalbandyan (May & December 2010, June 2013)

== Bilateral agreements ==
Both nations have signed several bilateral agreements, such as an Agreement on the reciprocal Promotion and Protection of Investments (1990); Agreement on international transportation by road (2000); Memorandum of Understanding in Tourism (2013); Agreement on the Avoidance of Double Taxation and Tax Evasion (2010) and an Agreement on Cultural, Educational and Scientific Cooperation (2013).

== Trade ==
In 2015, trade between Armenia and Spain totaled €55.8 million Euros. Armenia's main exports to Spain include: ores, slag and ash. Spain's main exports to Armenia include: ceramic products, preserved fruit and vegetables, perfume, rubber and meat.

== Resident diplomatic missions ==
- Armenia has an embassy in Madrid.
- Spain is accredited to Armenia from its embassy in Moscow, Russia and maintains an honorary consulate in Yerevan.
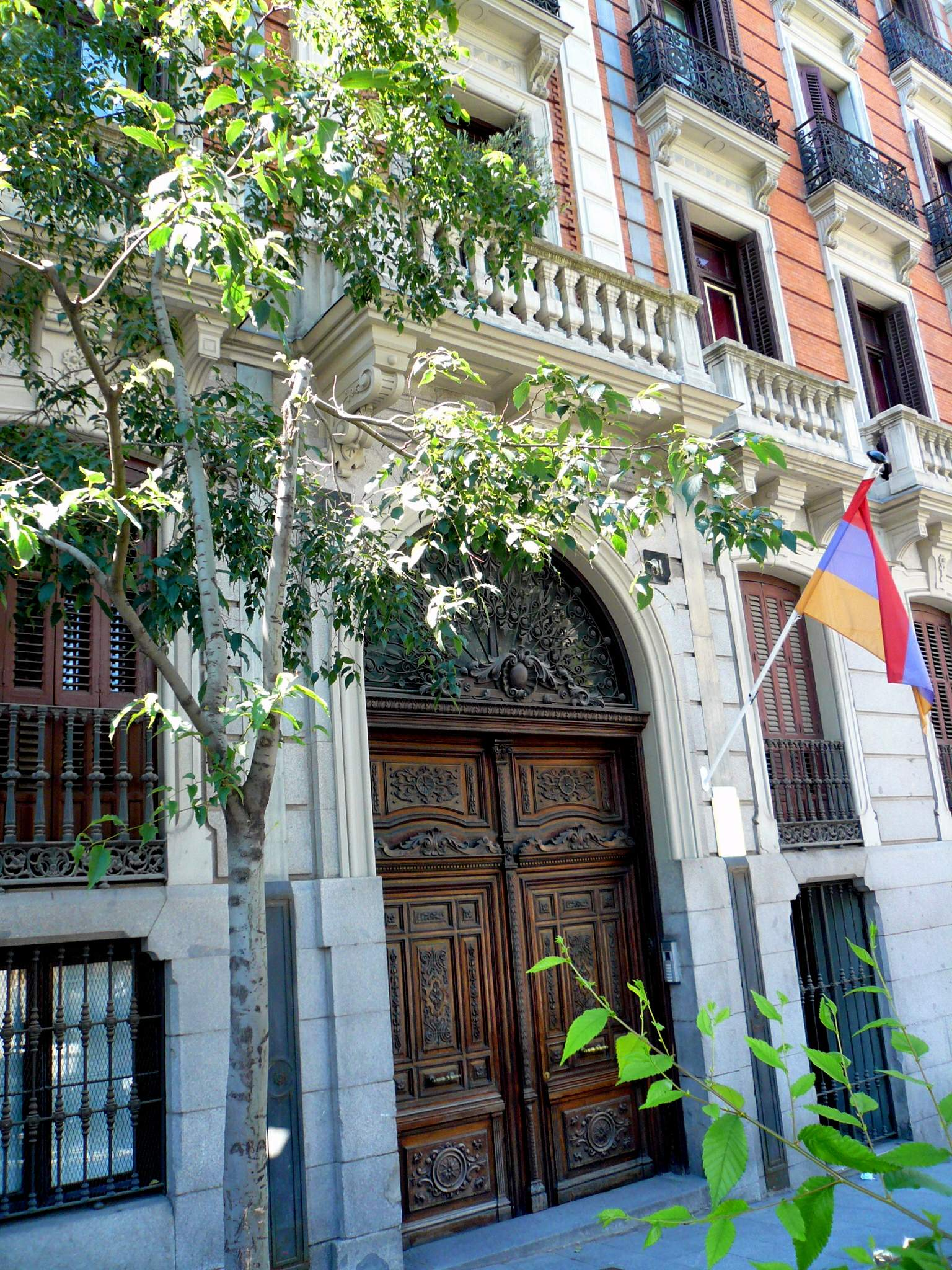
Embassy of Armenia in Madrid

== See also ==
- Foreign relations of Armenia
- Foreign relations of Spain
- Armenia-NATO relations
- Armenia-EU relations
  - Accession of Armenia to the EU
- Armenians in Spain
