= Anita Nemtin =

Hungarian equestrian

Personal information
- Nationality: Hungarian
- Born: 5 December 1969 (age 55) Montreal, Quebec, Canada

Sport
- Sport: Equestrian

Anita Nemtin (born 5 December 1969) is a Hungarian equestrian. She competed in the individual eventing at the 1996 Summer Olympics.
