= Linden Wiesman =

American equestrian

Personal information
- Born: January 23, 1975 (age 51) Columbia, Tennessee, U.S.
Medal record
Equestrian
Representing the United States
Olympic Games
Bronze medal – third place	2000 Sydney	Team eventing

Linden Wiesman (born January 23, 1975, in Columbia, Tennessee) is an American equestrian. She won a bronze medal in team eventing at the 2000 Summer Olympics in Sydney, together with Karen O'Connor, David O'Connor and Nina Fout.
