= Marco Cappai =

Italian equestrian

Personal information
- Nationality: Italian
- Born: 20 September 1973 (age 51); Rome, Italy

Sport
- Sport: Equestrian

Marco Cappai (born 20 September 1973) is an Italian equestrian. He competed in the individual eventing at the 1996 Summer Olympics.
