= Nikki Bishop =

Australian equestrian (born 1973)

Personal information
- Born: Nicola P. Bishop; 27 June 1973 (age 53) Scone, New South Wales, Australia

Sport
- Country: Australia
- Sport: Equestrian
- Event: Eventing

Nikki Bishop (born 27 June 1973 in Scone, New South Wales) now Nikki Richardson, is an Australian Olympic eventing rider. She competed at the Atlanta 1996 Olympics in the individual event. Riding Wishful Thinking, she finished the dressage phase in 3rd place with 40 points. She was eliminated during the cross country event.

Bishop is married to New Zealander Blair Richardson. Together they run Richardson Eventing at their property, Vantage Hill, at Scone.
