= Jean-Luc Force =

French equestrian

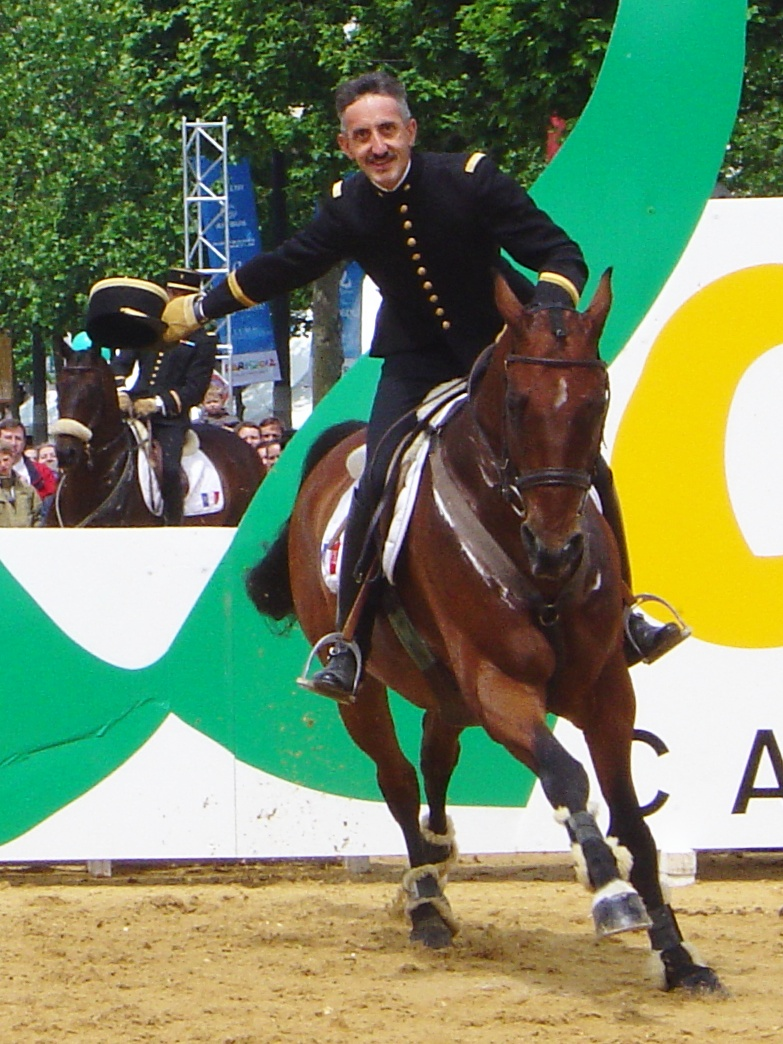
- Jean-Luc Force in 2005

Personal information
- Nationality: French
- Born: 31 March 1959 (age 67)

Sport
- Sport: Equestrian
Medal record
Equestrian
Representing France
World Championships
Silver medal – second place	2002 Jerez	Team eventing
European Championships
Silver medal – second place	2003 Punchestown	Team eventing

Jean-Luc Force (born 31 March 1959) is a French equestrian. He competed in the team eventing at the 2000 Summer Olympics.
