= Piotr Piasecki =

Polish equestrian

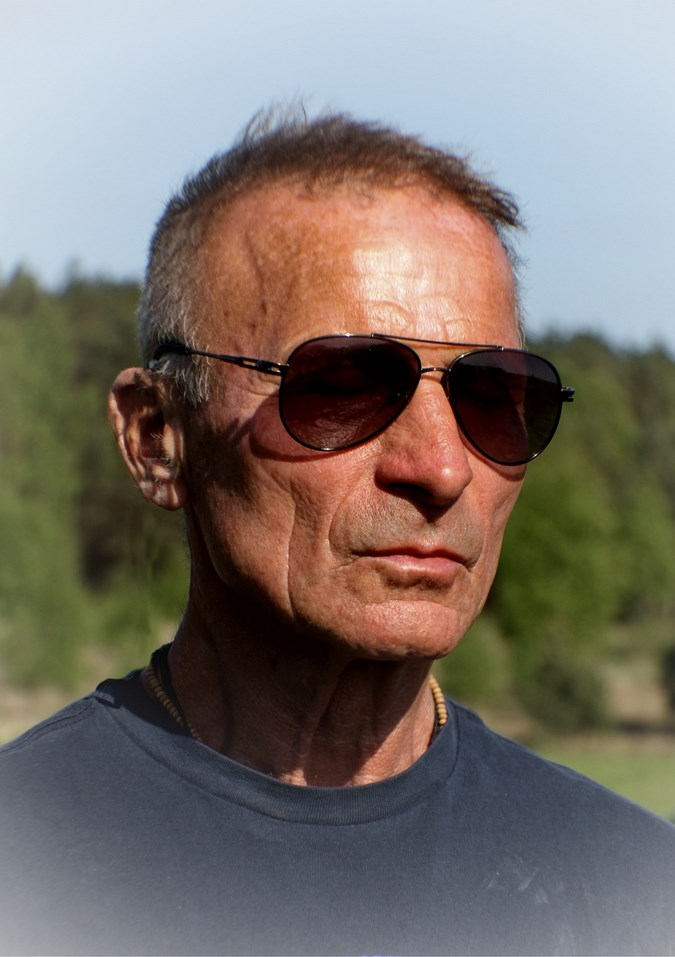
- Piotr Piasecki in 2018

Personal information
- Nationality: Polish
- Born: 4 September 1952 (age 72); Szczecin, Poland

Sport
- Sport: Equestrian

Piotr Piasecki (born 4 September 1952) is a Polish equestrian. He competed at the 1992 Summer Olympics and the 1996 Summer Olympics.
