= Javier Revuelta =

Spanish equestrian

Personal information
- Nationality: Spanish
- Born: 7 March 1957 (age 68); Valladolid, Spain

Sport
- Sport: Equestrian

Javier Revuelta (born 7 March 1957) is a Spanish equestrian. He competed in two events at the 1996 Summer Olympics.
