= Yoshihiko Kowata =

Japanese equestrian

Personal information
- Nationality: Japanese
- Born: 19 January 1965 (age 60)

Sport
- Sport: Equestrian

Yoshihiko Kowata (born 19 January 1965) is a Japanese equestrian. He competed at the 1992 Summer Olympics and the 1996 Summer Olympics.
