= Sally Clark (equestrian) =

New Zealand equestrian

Medal record

Representing New Zealand

Equestrian

Olympic Games
Silver medal – second place	1996 Atlanta	Individual Event

World Championships
Gold medal – first place	1998 Rome	Team Eventing

Sally Dorothy Ann Clark (née Dalrymple; born 11 April 1958) is a New Zealand equestrian who won a silver medal at the Olympic Games. She was born in Palmerston North.

Clark's international eventing career began in 1987 as part of the New Zealand Trans-Tasman Trophy team. She was short-listed for the 1988 Summer Olympics in Seoul but her horse Sky Command died. Clark had to wait 8 years to attend the Olympic Games and finished second to team-mate Blyth Tait in the individual Three Day Event. She won Gold with the New Zealand team the following year at the World Equestrian Games in Rome.

In 1999 she appeared on a postage stamp issued in Senegal.
