= Hendrik von Paepcke =

German equestrian

Personal information
- Nationality: German
- Born: 15 December 1974 (age 50); Bredeneek, West Germany

Sport
- Sport: Equestrian

Hendrik von Paepcke (born 15 December 1974) is a German equestrian. He competed in the individual eventing at the 1996 Summer Olympics.
