= Susan Shortt =

Irish equestrian

Personal information
- Nationality: Irish
- Born: 25 February 1966 (age 60) Kildare, Ireland

Sport
- Sport: Equestrian
Medal record
Equestrian
Representing Ireland
European Championships
Bronze medal – third place	1993 Achselschwang	Team eventing

Susan Shortt (born 25 February 1966) is an Irish equestrian. She competed at the 2000 Summer Olympics and the 2004 Summer Olympics.
