= Kelli McMullen-Temple =

Canadian equestrian

Personal information
- Nationality: Canadian
- Born: 25 October 1960 (age 65) Columbus, Ohio, United States

Sport
- Sport: Equestrian

Kelli McMullen-Temple (born 25 October 1960) is a Canadian equestrian. She competed in two events at the 1996 Summer Olympics.
