= Nils Haagensen =

Danish equestrian (born 1955)

Personal information
- Nationality: Danish
- Born: 20 May 1955 (age 71) Næstved, Denmark

Sport
- Sport: Equestrian
Medal record
Equestrian
Representing Denmark
European Championships
Gold medal – first place	1979 Luhmühlen	Individual eventing

Nils Haagensen (born 20 May 1955) is a Danish equestrian. He competed at five Olympic Games.
