= Enrique Sarasola Jr. =

Spanish equestrian

Enrique Sarasola
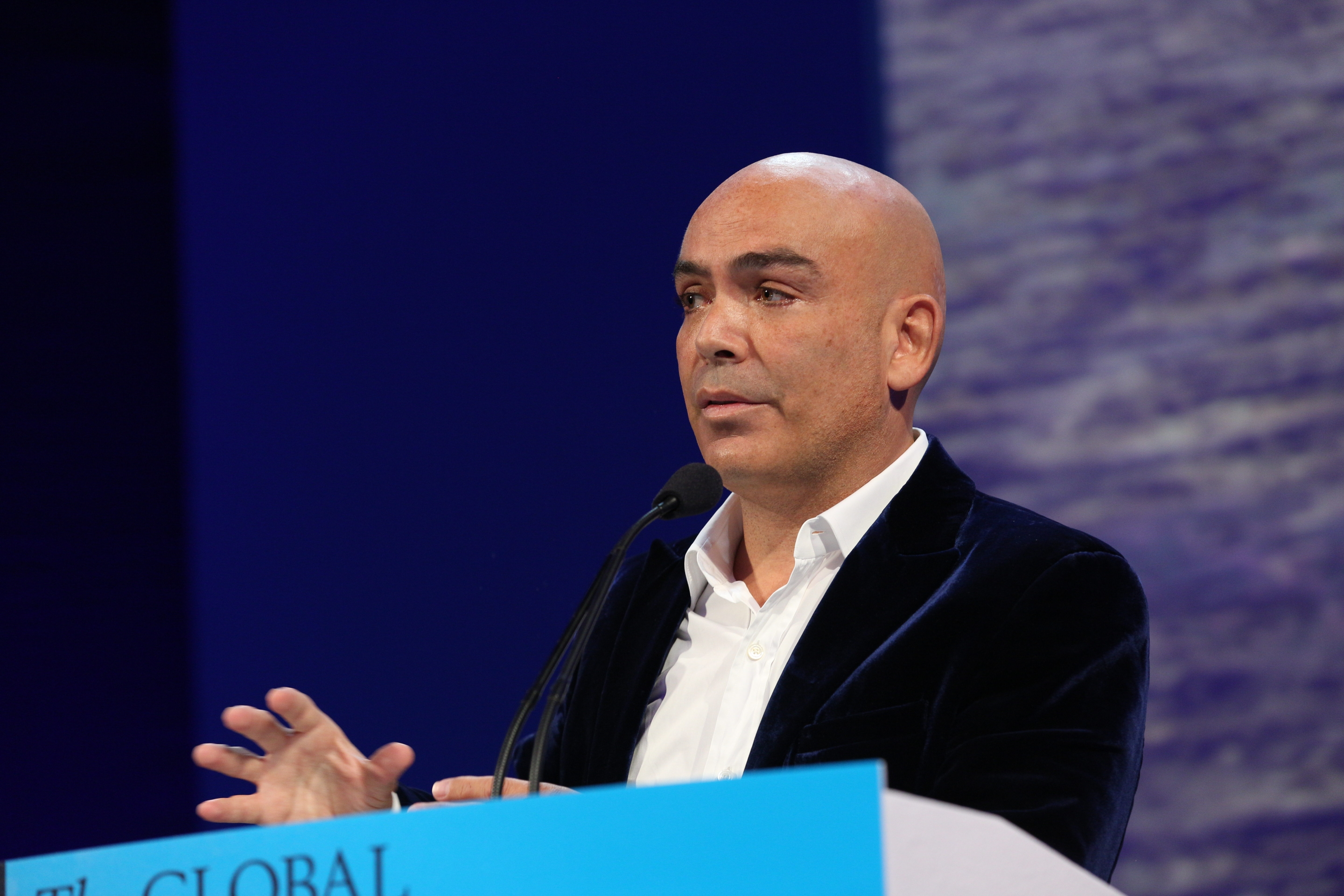
- Sarasola in 2016

Personal information
- Full name: Enrique José Sarasola Marulanda
- Nationality: Spanish
- Born: 12 November 1963 (age 62) Madrid, Spain

Sport
- Sport: Equestrian
Medal record
Equestrian
Representing Spain
European Championships
Bronze medal – third place	2001 Pau	Individual eventing

Enrique José Sarasola Marulanda (Note: In this Spanish name, the first or paternal surname is Sarasola and the second or maternal family name is Marulanda.) (born 12 November 1963) is a Spanish equestrian. He competed at the 1992 Summer Olympics, the 1996 Summer Olympics and the 2000 Summer Olympics.
