= Didier Willefert =

French equestrian

Personal information
- Nationality: French
- Born: 2 August 1964 (age 61) Marseille, France

Sport
- Sport: Equestrian
Medal record
Equestrian
Representing France
European Championships
Silver medal – second place	1995 Punchestown	Team eventing
Silver medal – second place	2005 Blenheim	Team eventing

Didier Willefert (born 2 August 1964) is a French equestrian. He competed at the 1996 Summer Olympics and the 2000 Summer Olympics.
