= Ramón Beca =

Spanish equestrian (born 1953)

Personal information
- Nationality: Spanish, Uruguayan
- Born: 8 April 1953 (age 72); Seville, Spain

Sport
- Sport: Equestrian

José Ramón Beca Borrego (born 8 April 1953) is a Spanish-born equestrian, who has been competing for Uruguay since 2015. He competed at the 1988 Summer Olympics, the 1996 Summer Olympics and the 2000 Summer Olympics.

After switching to Uruguay, Beca competed in dressage at three Pan American Games.
