= Jaime Matossian =

Spanish equestrian

Jaime Matossian (born 26 September 1955 in Madrid, Spain) is a retired Spanish equestrian. His horse was named New Venture.

Matossian competed at the 2000 Summer Olympics.
