= Constantin Van Rijckevorsel =

Belgian equestrian

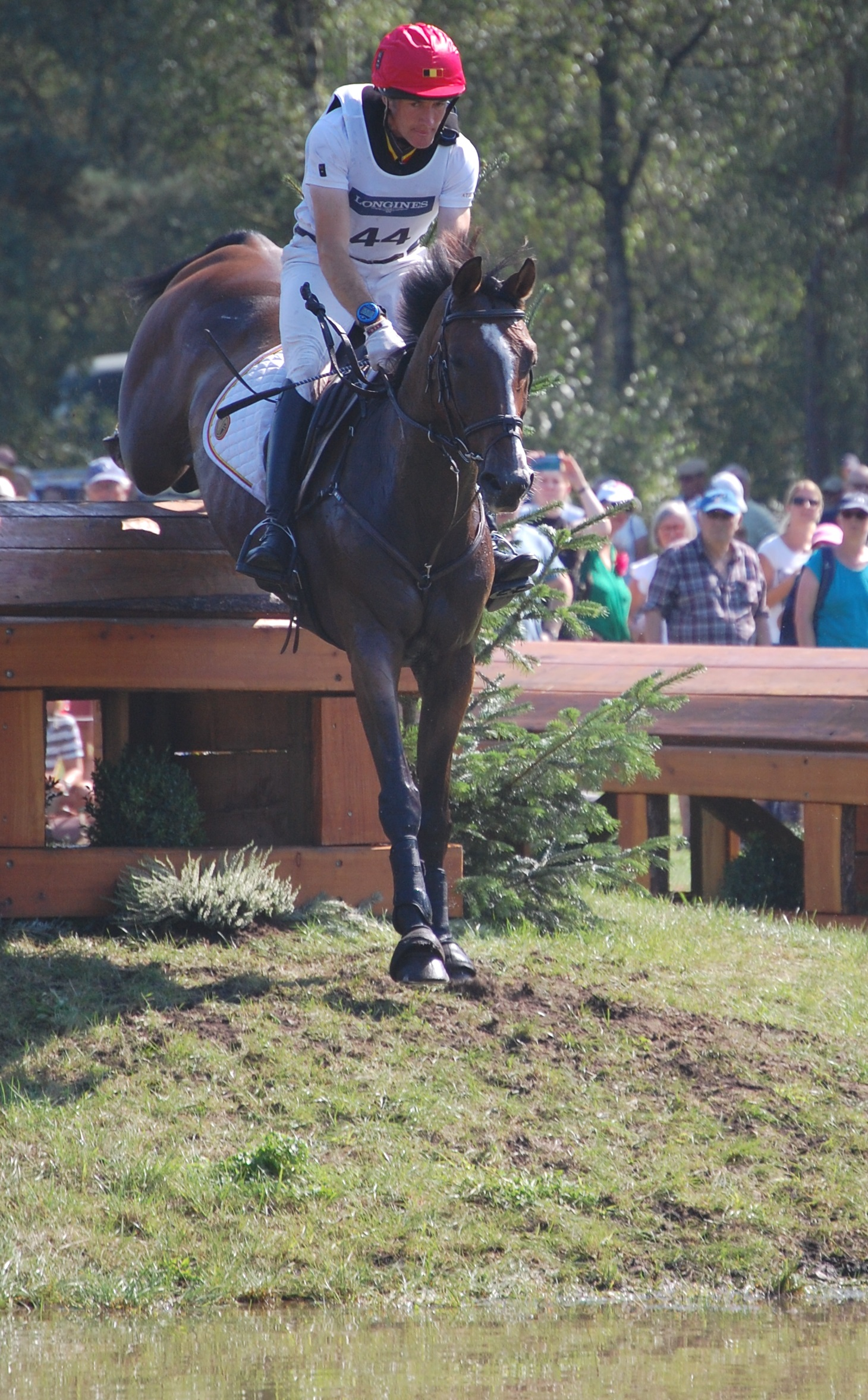
- Van Rijckevorsel riding Beat It (2019)

Personal information
- Nationality: Belgian
- Born: 24 June 1976 (age 50) Uccle, Belgium

Sport
- Sport: Equestrian
Medal record
Equestrian
Representing Belgium
European Championships
Bronze medal – third place	1999 Luhmühlen	Team eventing
Bronze medal – third place	2003 Punchestown	Team eventing
Bronze medal – third place	2009 Fontainebleau	Team eventing

Constantin Van Rijckevorsel (born 24 June 1976) is a Belgian equestrian. He competed at the 1996 Summer Olympics, the 2000 Summer Olympics and the 2004 Summer Olympics.
