= Lydia Lipscombe =

New Zealand swimmer

Personal information
- National team: New Zealand
- Born: 9 October 1979 (age 45); Christchurch, Canterbury, New Zealand

Sport
- Sport: Swimming

Lydia Jane Lipscombe (born 9 October 1979) is a former New Zealand female swimmer. She competed in the women's 100 m, 200 m, and 4 × 100 m backstroke events at the 1996 Summer Olympics.
