= Ready Teddy (horse) =

- Breed: Thoroughbred
- Sire: Brilliant Invader
- Grandsire: Vain
- Dam: Double Summer
- Maternal grandsire: Kwanza
- Sex: Gelding
- Foaled: 1987
- Died: 23 April 2011 (aged 23)
- Country: New Zealand
- Colour: Chestnut
- Owner: Blyth Tait

Ready Teddy
Medal record

Equestrian

Olympic Games
| Gold medal – first place | 1996 Atlanta | Individual eventing |

World Championships
| Gold medal – first place | 1998 Rome, Italy | Individual eventing |
| Gold medal – first place | 1998 Rome, Italy | Team eventing |

Ready Teddy (1987 – 23 April 2011) was an eventing horse competitively ridden by New Zealand equestrian Blyth Tait. Together the pair competed in three Olympics, winning gold at the 1996 Summer Games, and took two golds at the 1998 World Equestrian Games. He was the first eventing horse to win individual gold at both an Olympic Games and a World Equestrian Games. Ready Teddy died from colic in 2011.

== Early life ==
Ready Teddy was a chestnut Thoroughbred gelding foaled in 1987, sired by Brilliant Invader. As a young horse he was named Striking Back and competed in Thoroughbred racing. Blyth Tait's father found him at a Pony Club event and had him shipped to England in 1994, as an eventing prospect for his son.

== Competitive career ==
At the 1996 Atlanta Games, Ready Teddy and Tait competed at their first Olympics together (it was Tait's second Games overall). They competed only in the individual event at these games, and took gold, while Tait rode a different horse in the team event. In Sydney in 2000, they competed only in the team event, with the New Zealand team taking 8th overall, while Tait again rode a different horse in the individual event. At the 2004 Athens Olympics, Tait for the first time rode Ready Teddy in both the individual and team events, but wound up only taking 18th individually and 5th with the New Zealand team. The pair also competed in the World Equestrian Games in 1998, winning both individual and team gold. This event marked the first (and so far only) time that an event horse has won gold medals in individual competition at both the Olympic and World Equestrian Games. The pair competed in both the individual and team competitions at the 2002 World Equestrian Games in Jerez, but failed to complete the event. He also won at the Burghley Horse Trials in 2001.

== Later life and legacy ==
Ready Teddy and Tait retired together from international competition at the Manukau Three Day Event in Puhinui, New Zealand in 2004. Ready Teddy died on 23 April 2011 of complications from colic. He is buried at Tait's property at Karaka, near Auckland. Upon the announcement of Ready Teddy's death, Tait called him a "special horse" and said he had character, enthusiasm and a keenness for the sport.
