= Blyth Tait =

New Zealand equestrian

Blyth Tait MBE
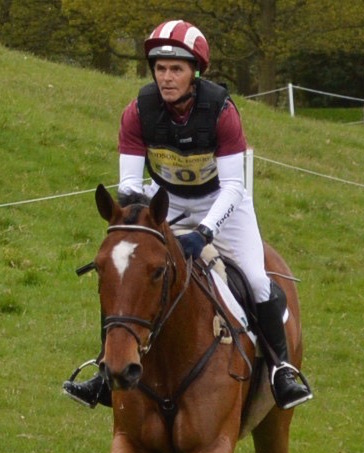
- Tait competing on Bear Necessity in 2015

Personal information
- Full name: Robert Blyth Tait
- Born: 10 May 1961 (age 65) Whangārei, New Zealand

Sport
- Country: New Zealand
- Sport: Equestrian
- Event: Eventing
Medal record
Representing New Zealand
Equestrian
Olympic Games
| Gold medal – first place | 1996 Atlanta | Individual eventing |
| Silver medal – second place | 1992 Barcelona | Team eventing |
| Bronze medal – third place | 1992 Barcelona | Individual eventing |
| Bronze medal – third place | 1996 Atlanta | Team eventing |
World Championships
| Gold medal – first place | 1990 Stockholm | Individual eventing |
| Gold medal – first place | 1990 Stockholm | Team eventing |
| Gold medal – first place | 1998 Rome | Individual eventing |
| Gold medal – first place | 1998 Rome | Team eventing |

Robert Blyth Tait MBE (born 10 May 1961) is a New Zealand equestrian. Tait has competed at four Olympics and has won four medals, one of only six New Zealanders to do so.

== Career ==
Tait's first success at international level was at the 1990 World Equestrian Games in Stockholm, when he won Gold in both the individual and team events riding Messiah. At the 1992 Olympics in Barcelona, he won Bronze in the individual event after teammate Vicky Latta knocked down a rail in the showjumping, and Silver in the team event with Latta and Andrew Nicholson (Mark Todd was also in the team but was not awarded a medal as he did not finish the event). At the 1996 Summer Olympics in Atlanta, he won Gold in the individual and Bronze in the Team event. Tait repeated his World Championships double Gold effort at Rome in 1998 riding Ready Teddy. He was flag-bearer for the New Zealand team at the 2000 Summer Olympics, but he was eliminated in both the individual and team events. Tait completed his competitive Olympic career with a fifth in the team event at the 2004 Summer Olympics in Athens. He was the eventing manager for the 2008 Summer Olympics.

In the 1993 Queen's Birthday Honours, Tait was appointed a Member of the Order of the British Empire, for services to equestrian sport. In 2019, he was an inaugural inductee into the Equestrian Sports New Zealand Hall of Fame.

== Olympic record ==
- 1992: individual bronze; team silver (both on Messiah)
- 1996: individual gold (on Ready Teddy); team bronze (on Chesterfield)
- 2000: individual did not finish (on Welton Envoy); team did not finish (on Ready Teddy)
- 2004: individual 18th; team 5th (both on Ready Teddy)

== Personal life ==
Tait is homosexual.

Awards
| Preceded by Rob Waddell | Lonsdale Cup of the New Zealand Olympic Committee; 2001 | Succeeded by Sarah Ulmer |
