= Andrew Nicholson (equestrian) =

New Zealand equestrian

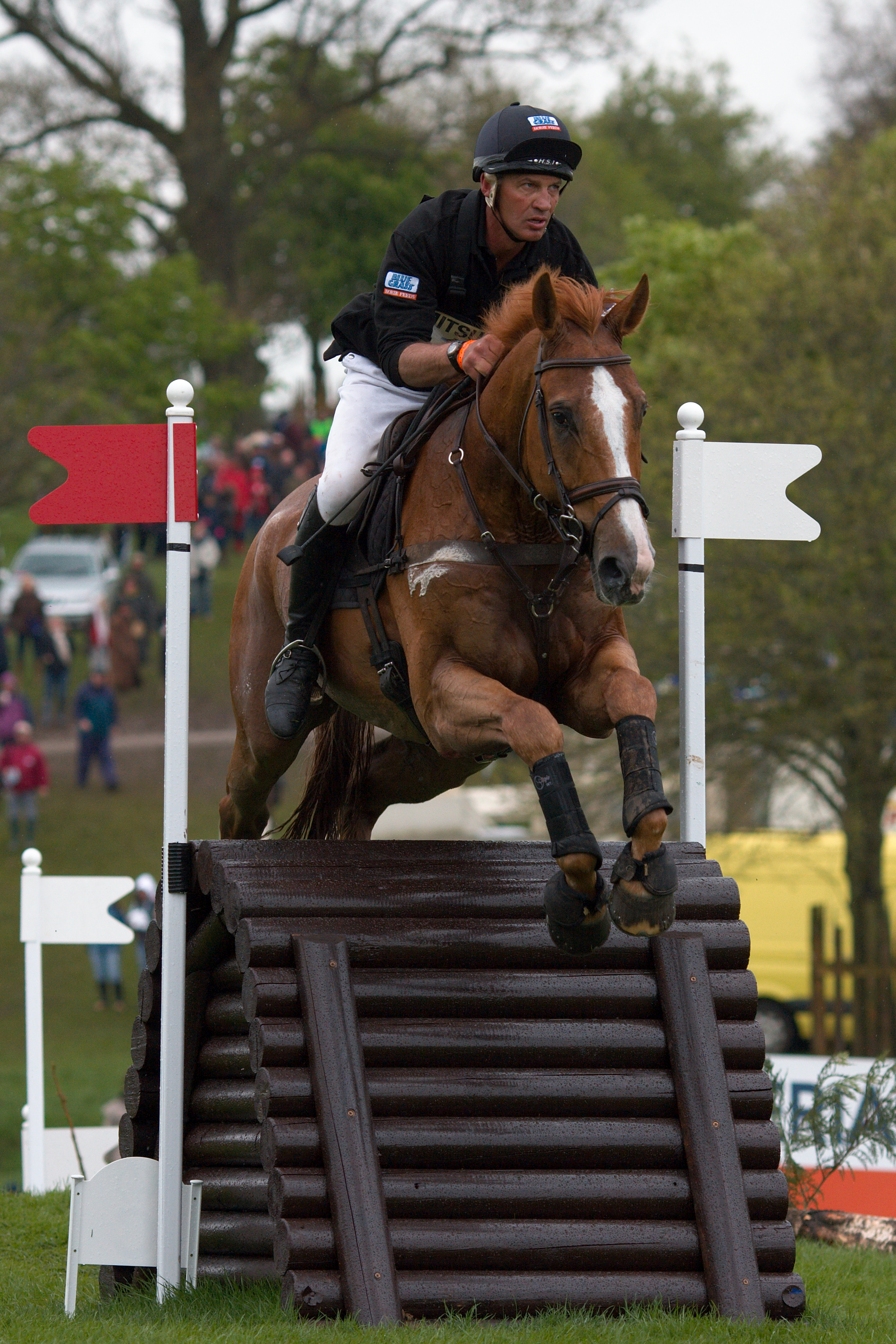
- Nicholson and Nereo at the Staircase during the cross-country phase of the 2010 Badminton Horse Trials

Medal record

Equestrian

Representing New Zealand

Olympic Games
Silver medal – second place	1992 Barcelona	Team eventing
Bronze medal – third place	1996 Atlanta	Team eventing
Bronze medal – third place	2012 London	Team eventing

World Championships
Gold medal – first place	1990 Stockholm	Team eventing
Bronze medal – third place	2010 Lexington	Team eventing
Bronze medal – third place	2010 Lexington	Individual eventing

Andrew Clifton Nicholson ONZM (born 1 August 1961 in Te Awamutu) is a New Zealand horseman who has competed at six Olympic Games (though selected for seven).

== Biography ==
Born and raised in the Waikato, Nicholson moved to England in the 1980s to further his equestrian career. He currently works there as a horse trainer.

Nicholson's greatest success at international level has been in Three-Day Event teams. He won a gold medal at the 1990 World Equestrian Games in Stockholm, a silver at the 1992 Olympics in Barcelona and a bronze at the 1996 Olympics in Atlanta. He is known for his ride on Spinning Rhombus at Barcelona. With the New Zealand team having seven rails in hand to win the gold medal, his horse knocked down nine rails. Instead of withdrawing, he kept the New Zealand team intact (his withdrawal would have instantly eliminated the entire team by dropping completing member numbers below the minimum required) to take the silver medal behind arch-rivals Australia. Nicholson competed at the 2010 WEG (world equestrian games) and received a bronze medal.

In the 2018 Queen's Birthday Honours, Nicholson was appointed an Officer of the New Zealand Order of Merit, for services to equestrian sport.

Nicholson and Mark Todd were the first New Zealanders to compete at six Olympic Games.

Nicholson's best individual results have been at Burghley which he has won five times on;

- Buckley Province in 1995,
- Mr Smiffy in 2000,
- Avebury in 2012, 2013 and 2014 consecutively.

After winning Burghley 2012, Nicholson went on to win:

- Pau 2012 with his Olympic mount Nereo,
- Kentucky 2013 on four star debutant Quimbo,
- Lumuhlen 2013 on Mr Cruise Control.

He also won the Badminton Horse Trials with Nereo in 2017, after 36 completions.

In 2019, Nicholson was an inaugural inductee into the Equestrian Sports New Zealand Hall of Fame.

== CCI 5* Results ==
Results
Event	Kentucky	Badminton	Luhmühlen	Burghley	Pau	Adelaide
1995		13th (Jägermeister II); RET (Spinning Rhombus)		(gold) (Buckley Province)		
1996		8th (Buckley Province); 12th (Cartoon II)				
1997		32nd (Cartoon II)				
1998		14th (Cartoon II); 40th (Jägermeister II)		(bronze) (Hinnegar); 8th (Merillion)		
1999	did not participate					
2000				(gold) (Mr Smiffy)		
2001	did not participate					
2002		9th (New York); 10th (Mr Smiffy)				
2003		11th (Fenicio); 13th (Mr Smiffy)		(bronze) (Lord Killinghurst)		
2004		(silver) (Lord Killinghurst); 22nd (Flush Banker)		(bronze) (Lord Killinghurst); 16th (Mr Smiffy)		
2005		5th (Lord Killinghurst); EL (Fenicio)	14th (Duddles)	(bronze) (Lord Killinghurst); 8th (Duddles)		
2006		14th (Lord Killinghurst)		13th (Henry Tankerville)		
2007		5th (Lord Killinghurst); 8th (Henry Tankerville)		4th (Lord Killinghurst); RET (Silbury Hill)	6th (Ginger May Killinghurst)	
2008		RET (Armada); RET (Silbury Hill)		8th (Armada); RET (Muschamp Impala)	4th (Henry Tankerville); EL (Muschamp Impala)	
2009		23rd (Armada)		21st (Armada); EL (Nereo)	13th (Armada); EL (Avebury)	
2010		11th (Nereo); 27th (Avebury)	4th (Mr Cruise Control); 10th (Armada)	14th (Armada); 22nd (Avebury)	9th (Mr Cruise Control)	
2011		10th (Avebury); 12th (Nereo)	10th (Armada); 14th (Mr Cruise Control)	(silver) (Nereo); 8th (Avebury)	(silver) (Mr Cruise Control); 23rd (Armada); RET (Henry Tankerville)	
2012	7th (Qwanza); RET (Calico Joe)		4th (Calico Joe); 21st (Shady Grey); 26th (Mr Cruise Control)	(gold) (Avebury); 13th (Calico Joe)	(gold) (Nereo); 7th (Mr Cruise Control)	,
2013	(gold) (Quimbo); (bronze) (Calico Joe)	(bronze) (Nereo); 11th (Avebury)	(gold) (Mr Cruise Control); 6th (Rathmoyle King); EL (Qwanza)	(gold) (Avebury); (silver) (Nereo); 7th (Calico Joe)	5th (Mr Cruise Control); 26th (Quimbo); RET (Viscount George)	
2014	21st (Avebury)	RET (Quimbo); EL (Nereo)		(gold) (Avebury)		
2015		6th (Nereo); 22nd (Calico Joe)	22nd (Qwanza)			
2016			5th (Qwanza); 7th (Perfect Stranger)	(silver) (Nereo)		
2017		(gold) (Nereo); 12th (Qwanza)	19th (Teseo)	8th (Nereo); EL (Qwanza)	RET (Qwanza); EL (Jet Set)	
2018		WD (Nereo)		(bronze) (Swallow Springs); WD (Jet Set)		
2019		4th (Swallow Springs)				
EL = Eliminated; RET = Retired; WD = Withdrew

== International championship results ==
Results
Year	Event	Horse	Placing	Notes
1984	Olympic Games	Kahlua	6th	Team
1984	Olympic Games	Kahlua	28th	Individual
1990	World Equestrian Games	Spinning Rhombus	1st place, gold medalist(s)	Team
1990	World Equestrian Games	Spinning Rhombus	4th	Individual
1992	Olympic Games	Spinning Rhombus	2nd place, silver medalist(s)	Team
1992	Olympic Games	Spinning Rhombus	16th	Individual
1994	World Equestrian Games	Jager Meister	6th	Team
1994	World Equestrian Games	Jager Meister	48th	Individual
1996	Olympic Games	Jager Meister	3rd place, bronze medalist(s)	Team
1996	Olympic Games	Buckley Province	EL	Individual
1998	World Equestrian Games	New York	5th	Individual
2002	World Equestrian Games	Fenicio	5th	Team
2002	World Equestrian Games	Fenicio	9th	Individual
2003	World Cup Final	Fenicio	2nd place, silver medalist(s)	
2003	Asian Pacific Games	Duddles	2nd place, silver medalist(s)	Team
2003	Asian Pacific Games	Duddles	9th	Individual
2004	World Cup Final	Flush Banker	14th	
2004	Olympic Games	Fenicio	5th	Team
2004	Olympic Games	Fenicio	60th	Individual
2006	World Young Horse Championships	Armada	23rd	CCI**
2006	World Equestrian Games	Lord Killinghurst	6th	Team
2006	World Equestrian Games	Lord Killinghurst	23rd	Individual
2007	World Young Horse Championships	Mr Cruise Control	4th	CCI*
2007	World Young Horse Championships	Avebury	4th	CCI**
2007	World Young Horse Championships	Nereo	41st	CCI**
2008	World Young Horse Championships	Tristar II	7th	CCI*
2008	World Young Horse Championships	Mr Cruise Control	11th	CCI**
2008	World Cup Final	Henry Tankerville	26th	
2008	Olympic Games	Lord Killinghurst	5th	Team
2008	Olympic Games	Lord Killinghurst	EL	Individual
2009	World Young Horse Championships	Qwanza	6th	CCI*
2009	World Young Horse Championships	Tristar II	14th	CCI**
2010	World Young Horse Championships	Quimbo	3rd place, bronze medalist(s)	CCI**
2010	World Young Horse Championships	Qwanza	16th	CCI**
2010	World Equestrian Games	Nereo	3rd place, bronze medalist(s)	Team
2010	World Equestrian Games	Nereo	3rd place, bronze medalist(s)	Individual
2012	Olympic Games	Nereo	3rd place, bronze medalist(s)	Team
2012	Olympic Games	Nereo	4th	Individual
2013	World Young Horse Championships	Jet Set	2nd place, silver medalist(s)	CCI*
2013	World Young Horse Championships	Tilikum	13th	CCI**
2014	World Young Horse Championships	Swallow Springs	9th	CCI*
2014	World Young Horse Championships	Jet Set	6th	CCI**
2014	World Equestrian Games	Nereo	14th	Team
2014	World Equestrian Games	Nereo	8th	Individual
2017	World Young Horse Championships	As Is	7th	CCI*
2017	World Young Horse Championships	Yacabo BK	3rd place, bronze medalist(s)	CCI**
EL = Eliminated; RET = Retired; WD = Withdrew
