= Equestrian at the 2000 Summer Olympics – Individual jumping =

Equestrian at the Olympics

Individual jumping at the Games of the XXVII Olympiad
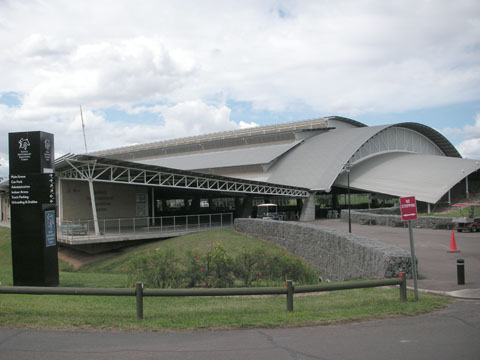
- Sydney International Equestrian Centre at Horsley Park
- Venue: Sydney International Equestrian Centre
- Dates: 25 September – 1 October 2000
- Competitors: 74 from 28 nations
- Teams: 28
- Winning total: 4.00 faults

Medalists
| 1st place, gold medalist(s) | | Jeroen Dubbeldam; Netherlands |
| 2nd place, silver medalist(s) | | Albert Voorn; Netherlands |
| 3rd place, bronze medalist(s) | | Khaled Al Eid; Saudi Arabia |

The individual show jumping event, part of the equestrian program at the 2000 Summer Olympics, was held from 25 September–1 October 2000 at the Sydney International Equestrian Centre 45 miles outside of Sydney, Australia. Like all other equestrian events, the jumping competition was mixed gender, with both male and female athletes competing in the same division. There were 74 competitors from 28 nations. Each nation could have up to 4 riders. The event resulted in a three-way tie for first and a medal jump-off. Dutch riders Jeroen Dubbeldam and Albert Voorn finished first and second in that jump-off, earning the Netherlands' first gold medal and second silver medal in individual jumping. Khaled Al Eid earned Saudi Arabia's first medal in the event with his bronze, finishing third in the jump-off.

== Background ==
This was the 21st appearance of the event, which had first been held at the 1900 Summer Olympics and has been held at every Summer Olympics at which equestrian sports have been featured (that is, excluding 1896, 1904, and 1908). It is the oldest event on the current programme, the only one that was held in 1900.

Seven of the top 10 riders from the 1996 Games returned: silver medalist Wilhelm Melliger of Switzerland, bronze medalist Alexandra Ledermann of France, sixth-place finisher Geoff Billington of Great Britain, seventh-place finisher Jan Tops of the Netherlands (who had also finished in the top 10 in 1988 and 1992), eighth-place finisher Álvaro de Miranda Neto of Brazil, and ninth-place finishers Rodrigo de Paula Pessoa of Brazil and John Whitaker of Great Britain. 1992 Olympic gold medalist Ludger Beerbaum of Germany also returned. Pessoa was also the reigning World Champion and had finished in the top 10 at the 1992 Games; he was the favorite in Sydney.

Iran and Jordan each made their debut in the event. France competed for the 19th time, most of any nation.

== Competition format ==
The competition used the five-round format introduced in 1992, with three rounds in the qualifying round and two rounds in the final. The one significant change from the previous Games was that the number of pairs advancing to the final increased from 25 to 45 but a mid-final cut was reintroduced, with only 20 pairs competing in the second half of the final.

For the qualifying round, each pair competed in three rounds. The total score across all three rounds counted for advancement to the individual final; the second and third rounds counted towards the team score. The individual competition allowed 45 pairs to advance to the final, though only three pairs per nation were allowed.

In the final, there were two rounds. All of the finalists competed in the first, but only the top 20 pairs competed again in the second round. The combined score for the two rounds was the result for those pairs. A jump-off would be used if necessary to break ties for medal positions; other ties would not be broken.

== Schedule ==
All times are Australian Eastern Standard Time (UTC+10)

| Date | Time | Round |
|---|---|---|
| Monday, 25 September 2000 | 10:30 | Qualifying round 1 |
| Thursday, 28 September 2000 | 8:30; 13:45 | Qualifying round 2 Qualifying round 3 |
| Sunday, 1 October 2000 | 10:00; 14:00 | Final round A Final round B |

== Results ==
=== Qualifying round ===
==== Round 1 ====
Held Monday, 25 September 2000. The two riders who were eliminated during the round automatically received a score 20 points higher than the highest other score and continued to compete in the second round.

| Rank | Rider | Horse | Nation | Penalties | | |
| Rank | Rider | Horse | Nation | Jump | Time | Total |
|---|---|---|---|---|---|---|
| 1 | Jeroen Dubbeldam | Sjiem | Netherlands | 0 | 0.50 | 0.50 |
| 1 | Bruce Goodin | Lenaro | New Zealand | 0 | 0.50 | 0.50 |
| 3 | Ludger Beerbaum | Goldfever 3 | Germany | 0 | 1.25 | 1.25 |
| 4 | Martin Dopazo | Calwaro | Argentina | 0 | 2.25 | 2.25 |
| 5 | Jamie Coman | Zazu | Australia | 4.0 | 0.25 | 4.25 |
| 6 | Maria Gretzer | Feliciano | Sweden | 4.0 | 0.50 | 4.50 |
| 6 | Malin Baryard | Butterfly Flip | Sweden | 4.0 | 0.50 | 4.50 |
| 6 | Khaled Al Eid | Khashm Al Aan | Saudi Arabia | 4.0 | 0.50 | 4.50 |
| 9 | Luiz Felipe De Azevedo | Ralph | Brazil | 4.0 | 0.75 | 4.75 |
| 9 | Thomas Velin | Carnute | Denmark | 4.0 | 0.75 | 4.75 |
| 11 | Rodrigo Pessoa | Baloubet du Rouet | Brazil | 4.0 | 1.0 | 5.00 |
| 11 | Phillipe Rozier | Barbarian | France | 4.0 | 1.0 | 5.00 |
| 13 | Ian Millar | Dorincord | Canada | 4.0 | 1.25 | 5.25 |
| 13 | Andre Johannpeter | Calei | Brazil | 4.0 | 1.25 | 5.25 |
| 13 | Markus Fuchs | Tinka's Boy | Switzerland | 4.0 | 1.25 | 5.25 |
| 16 | Carlos Milthaler | As Schylok | Chile | 4.0 | 1.50 | 5.50 |
| 16 | Rutherford Latham | Bretzel | Spain | 4.0 | 1.50 | 5.50 |
| 18 | Tadayoshi Hayashi | Swanky | Japan | 4.0 | 1.75 | 5.75 |
| 19 | Lesley McNaught | Dulf | Switzerland | 4.0 | 2.00 | 6.00 |
| 20 | Jan Tops | Roofs | Netherlands | 4.0 | 2.25 | 6.25 |
| 21 | Laura Kraut | Liberty | United States | 8.0 | 0.00 | 8.00 |
| 21 | Alexandra Ledermann | Rochet M | France | 8.0 | 0.00 | 8.00 |
| 23 | Thierry Pomel | Thor Des Chain | France | 8.0 | 0.50 | 8.50 |
| 23 | Saleh Andre Sakakini | Careful | Egypt | 8.0 | 0.50 | 8.50 |
| 25 | Taizo Sugitani | Mania Jolly | Japan | 8.0 | 0.75 | 8.75 |
| 25 | Marcus Ehning | For Pleasure | Germany | 8.0 | 0.75 | 8.75 |
| 27 | Gianni Govoni | Las Vegas | Italy | 8.0 | 1.00 | 9.00 |
| 27 | Jos Lansink | Carthago Z | Netherlands | 8.0 | 1.00 | 9.00 |
| 27 | Takeshi Shirai | Vicomte Du Mes | Japan | 8.0 | 1.00 | 9.00 |
| 30 | Alfonso Carlos Romo | Montemorelos | Mexico | 8.0 | 1.25 | 9.25 |
| 31 | Lars Nieberg | Esprit FRH | Germany | 8.0 | 1.50 | 9.50 |
| 32 | Beat Maendli | Pozitano | Switzerland | 8.0 | 1.75 | 9.75 |
| 32 | Michael Whitaker | Prince of Wales | Great Britain | 8.0 | 1.75 | 9.75 |
| 34 | Geoff Billington | It's Otto | Great Britain | 7.0 | 3.25 | 10.25 |
| 35 | Antonio Maurer | Mortero | Mexico | 12.0 | 0.00 | 12.00 |
| 35 | Albert Voorn | Lando | Netherlands | 12.0 | 0.00 | 12.00 |
| 37 | Lauren Hough | Clasiko | United States | 12.0 | 0.50 | 12.50 |
| 37 | Geoff Bloomfield | Money Talks | Australia | 12.0 | 0.50 | 12.50 |
| 37 | Rosen Raychev | Premier Cru | Bulgaria | 12.0 | 0.50 | 12.50 |
| 40 | Gavin Chester | Another Flood | Australia | 12.0 | 1.00 | 13.00 |
| 41 | Manuel Torres | Marco | Colombia | 12.0 | 1.50 | 13.50 |
| 41 | Lisen Bratt | Casanova | Sweden | 12.0 | 1.50 | 13.50 |
| 43 | Santiago Lambre | Tlaloc | Mexico | 12.0 | 2.00 | 14.00 |
| 43 | Otto Becker | Cento | Germany | 12.0 | 2.00 | 14.00 |
| 45 | Samantha McIntosh | Royal Discover | New Zealand | 11.0 | 2.25 | 14.25 |
| 46 | Jonathan Asselin | Spirit | Canada | 12.0 | 2.50 | 14.50 |
| 47 | Toni Leviste | Ghandy | Philippines | 12.0 | 2.75 | 14.75 |
| 47 | Carl Edwards | Bit More Candy | Great Britain | 12.0 | 2.75 | 14.75 |
| 49 | Margie Goldstein Engle | Perin | United States | 16.0 | 0.00 | 16.00 |
| 49 | Ludo Philippaerts | Otterongo | Belgium | 16.0 | 0.00 | 16.00 |
| 49 | Jerry Smit | Lux Z | Italy | 16.0 | 0.00 | 16.00 |
| 52 | Fernando Sarasola | Ennio | Spain | 16.0 | 0.50 | 16.50 |
| 53 | Ron Easey | Rolling Thunder | Australia | 16.0 | 0.75 | 16.75 |
| 54 | Joaquin Larrain | Jagermeister | Chile | 16.0 | 1.00 | 17.00 |
| 55 | Helena Lundbaeck | Mynta | Sweden | 16.0 | 1.25 | 17.25 |
| 56 | Jay Hayes | Diva | Canada | 16.0 | 1.50 | 17.50 |
| 57 | Wilhelm Melliger | Calvaro V | Switzerland | 16.0 | 2.00 | 18.00 |
| 58 | Ali Nilforoshan | Campione | Iran | 16.0 | 2.50 | 18.50 |
| 59 | Peter Breakwell | Leonson | New Zealand | 20.0 | 0.75 | 20.75 |
| 60 | Günter Orschel | Excellent | Bulgaria | 20.0 | 2.25 | 22.25 |
| 61 | Ricardo Jurado | Gismo | Spain | 19.0 | 3.50 | 22.50 |
| 62 | Patrice Deleveau | Caucalis | France | 19.0 | 4.50 | 23.50 |
| 63 | Gigi Hewitt | Genevieve | Virgin Islands | 24.0 | 0.00 | 24.00 |
| 64 | Luis Astolfi | Filias | Spain | 20.0 | 4.25 | 24.25 |
| 65 | Anton-Martin Bauer | Equo | Austria | 24.0 | 0.50 | 24.50 |
| 66 | Alvaro Miranda Neto | Aspen | Brazil | 24.0 | 7.75 | 24.75 |
| 66 | John Whitaker | Calvaro | Great Britain | 17.0 | 0.75 | 24.75 |
| 68 | Princess Haya bint Al Hussein | Lucilla | Jordan | 24.0 | 1.50 | 25.50 |
| 69 | John Pearce | Vagabond | Canada | 24.0 | 2.00 | 26.00 |
| 70 | Kamal Bahamdan | Chanel | Saudi Arabia | 27.0 | 4.50 | 31.50 |
| 71 | Ryuma Hirota | Man of Gold | Japan | 27.0 | 6.75 | 33.75 |
| 72 | Fahad Al-Geaid | National Guard | Saudi Arabia | 51.0 | 8.75 | 59.75 |
| 73 | Ramzy Al Duhami | Saif Al Adel | Saudi Arabia | — | — | Elim. (79.75) |
| 73 | Nona Garson | Rhythmical | United States | — | — | Elim. (79.75) |

==== Round 2 ====
The second qualifying round was also the first team round. Held Thursday, 28 September 2000.

| Rank | Rider | Horse | Nation | Penalties | | | |
| Rank | Rider | Horse | Nation | Round 1 | Jump | Time | Total |
|---|---|---|---|---|---|---|---|
| 1 | Thomas Velin | Carnute | Denmark | 4.75 | 0.00 | 0.00 | 4.75 |
| 2 | Rodrigo Pessoa | Baloubet du Rouet | Brazil | 5.00 | 0.00 | 0.00 | 5.00 |
| 3 | Markus Fuchs | Tinka's Boy | Switzerland | 5.25 | 0.00 | 0.00 | 5.25 |
| 3 | Ian Millar | Dorincord | Canada | 5.25 | 0.00 | 0.00 | 5.25 |
| 5 | Alexandra Ledermann | Rochet M | France | 8.00 | 0.00 | 0.00 | 8.00 |
| 6 | Jamie Coman | Zazu | Australia | 4.25 | 4.00 | 0.00 | 8.25 |
| 7 | Jeroen Dubbeldam | Sjiem | Netherlands | 0.50 | 8.00 | 0.00 | 8.50 |
| 7 | Bruce Goodin | Lenaro | New Zealand | 0.50 | 8.00 | 0.00 | 8.50 |
| 7 | Khaled Al Eid | Khashm Al Aan | Saudi Arabia | 4.50 | 4.00 | 0.00 | 8.50 |
| 10 | Marcus Ehning | For Pleasure | Germany | 8.75 | 0.00 | 0.00 | 8.75 |
| 11 | Phillipe Rozier | Barbarian | France | 5.00 | 4.00 | 0.00 | 9.00 |
| 12 | Laura Kraut | Liberty | United States | 8.00 | 4.00 | 0.00 | 12.00 |
| 13 | Thierry Pomel | Thor Des Chain | France | 8.50 | 4.00 | 0.00 | 12.50 |
| 14 | Luiz Felipe De Azevedo | Ralph | Brazil | 4.75 | 8.00 | 0.00 | 12.75 |
| 15 | Gianni Tovoni | Las Vegas | Italy | 9.00 | 4.00 | 0.00 | 13.00 |
| 15 | Jos Lansink | Carthago Z | Netherlands | 9.00 | 4.00 | 0.00 | 13.00 |
| 17 | Malin Baryard | Butterfly Flip | Sweden | 4.50 | 7.00 | 1.75 | 13.25 |
| 17 | Andre Johannpeter | Calei | Brazil | 5.25 | 8.00 | 0.00 | 13.25 |
| 19 | Tadayoshi Hayashi | Swanky | Japan | 5.75 | 8.00 | 0.00 | 13.75 |
| 20 | Otto Becker | Cento | Germany | 14.00 | 0.00 | 0.00 | 14.00 |
| 21 | Samantha McIntosh | Royal Discover | New Zealand | 14.25 | 0.00 | 0.00 | 14.25 |
| 22 | Martin Dopazo | Calwaro | Argentina | 2.25 | 12.00 | 0.25 | 14.50 |
| 23 | Albert Voorn | Lando | Netherlands | 12.00 | 0.00 | 4.00 | 16.00 |
| 23 | Margie Goldstein Engle | Perin | United States | 16.00 | 0.00 | 0.00 | 16.00 |
| 25 | Saleh Andre Sakakini | Careful | Egypt | 8.50 | 8.00 | 0.00 | 16.50 |
| 26 | Takeshi Shirai | Vicomte Du Mes | Japan | 9.00 | 8.00 | 0.00 | 17.00 |
| 27 | Alfonso Carlos Romo | Montemorelos | Mexico | 9.25 | 8.00 | 0.00 | 17.25 |
| 28 | Lisen Bratt | Casanova | Sweden | 13.50 | 4.00 | 0.00 | 17.50 |
| 28 | Lars Nieberg | Esprit FRH | Germany | 9.50 | 8.00 | 0.00 | 17.50 |
| 30 | Michael Whitaker | Prince of Wales | Great Britain | 9.75 | 8.00 | 0.00 | 17.75 |
| 30 | Beat Maendli | Pozitano | Switzerland | 9.75 | 8.00 | 0.00 | 17.75 |
| 32 | Wilhelm Melliger | Calvaro V | Switzerland | 18.00 | 0.00 | 0.00 | 18.00 |
| 32 | Santiago Lambre | Tlaloc | Mexico | 14.00 | 4.00 | 0.00 | 18.00 |
| 34 | Taizo Sugitani | Mania Jolly | Japan | 8.75 | 7.00 | 3.00 | 18.75 |
| 35 | Jan Tops | Roofs | Netherlands | 6.25 | 11.00 | 2.25 | 19.50 |
| 35 | Rutherford Latham | Bretzel | Spain | 5.50 | 11.00 | 3.00 | 19.50 |
| 37 | Lauren Hough | Clasiko | United States | 12.50 | 8.00 | 0.00 | 20.50 |
| 37 | Geoff Bloomfield | Money Talks | Australia | 12.50 | 8.00 | 0.00 | 20.50 |
| 39 | Lesley McNaught | Dulf | Switzerland | 6.00 | 11.00 | 4.00 | 21.00 |
| 39 | Gavin Chester | Another Flood | Australia | 13.00 | 8.00 | 0.00 | 21.00 |
| 41 | Helena Lundbaeck | Mynta | Sweden | 17.25 | 4.00 | 0.00 | 21.25 |
| 41 | Ludger Beerbaum | Goldfever 3 | Germany | 1.25 | 20.00 | 0.00 | 21.25 |
| 43 | Carlos Milthaler | As Schylok | Chile | 5.50 | 16.00 | 0.00 | 21.50 |
| 44 | Geoff Billington | It's Otto | Great Britain | 10.25 | 11.00 | 1.75 | 23.00 |
| 45 | Ludo Philippaerts | Otterongo | Belgium | 16.00 | 8.00 | 0.00 | 24.00 |
| 46 | Maria Gretzer | Feliciano | Sweden | 4.50 | 19.00 | 1.25 | 24.75 |
| 46 | John Whitaker | Calvaro | Great Britain | 24.75 | 0.00 | 0.00 | 24.75 |
| 48 | Manuel Torres | Marco | Colombia | 13.50 | 12.00 | 0.00 | 25.50 |
| 49 | Jonathan Asselin | Spirit | Canada | 14.50 | 12.00 | 0.00 | 26.50 |
| 50 | Carl Edwards | Bit More Candy | Great Britain | 14.75 | 12.00 | 0.50 | 27.25 |
| 51 | Antonio Maurer | Mortero | Mexico | 12.00 | 16.00 | 0.00 | 28.00 |
| 52 | Rossen Raitchev | Premier Cru | Bulgaria | 12.50 | 16.00 | 0.00 | 28.50 |
| 53 | Alvaro Miranda Neto | Aspen | Brazil | 24.75 | 4.00 | 0.00 | 28.75 |
| 54 | Joaquin Larrain | Jagermeister | Chile | 17.00 | 12.00 | 0.00 | 29.00 |
| 55 | Ali Nilforoshan | Campione | Iran | 18.50 | 12.00 | 0.00 | 30.50 |
| 55 | Ricardo Jurado | Gismo | Spain | 22.50 | 8.00 | 0.00 | 30.50 |
| 57 | Jerry Smit | Lux Z | Italy | 16.00 | 16.00 | 0.00 | 32.00 |
| 58 | Anton-Martin Bauer | Equo | Austria | 24.50 | 8.00 | 0.00 | 32.50 |
| 59 | Peter Breakwell | Leonson | New Zealand | 20.75 | 12.00 | 0.00 | 32.75 |
| 59 | Ron Easey | Rolling Thunder | Australia | 16.75 | 16.00 | 0.00 | 32.75 |
| 61 | Toni Leviste | Ghandy | Philippines | 14.75 | 20.00 | 0.75 | 35.50 |
| 61 | Patrice Deleveau | Caucalis | France | 23.50 | 12.00 | 0.00 | 35.50 |
| 63 | Fernando Sarasola | Ennio | Spain | 16.50 | 20.00 | 0.00 | 36.50 |
| 64 | John Pearce | Vagabond | Canada | 26.00 | 12.00 | 0.00 | 38.00 |
| 65 | Guenter Orschel | Excellent | Bulgaria | 22.50 | 16.00 | 0.00 | 38.50 |
| 66 | Gigi Hewitt | Genevieve | Virgin Islands | 24.00 | 16.00 | 0.00 | 40.00 |
| 67 | Ryuma Hirota | Man of Gold | Japan | 33.75 | 8.00 | 0.00 | 41.75 |
| 68 | Jay Hayes | Diva | Canada | 17.50 | 27.00 | 2.25 | 46.75 |
| 69 | Princess Haya bint Al Hussein | Lucilla | Jordan | 25.50 | 19.00 | 4.25 | 48.75 |
| 70 | Luis Astolfi | Filias | Spain | 24.25 | 23.00 | 3.75 | 51.00 |
| 71 | Kamal Bahamdan | Chanel | Saudi Arabia | 31.5 | 21.00 | 8.25 | 60.75 |
| 72 | Nona Garson | Rhythmical | United States | 79.75 | 16.00 | 0.00 | 95.75 |
| 73 | Fahad Al-Geaid | National Guard | Saudi Arabia | 59.75 | DNS | | DNF |
| 73 | Ramzy Al Duhami | Saif Al Adel | Saudi Arabia | 79.75 | DNS | | DNF |

==== Round 3 ====
The third individual qualifier was also the second team round. All athletes competed individually regardless of their team's qualification. 45 pairs advanced to the final round. Only three pairs from any single NOC could advance. This led to four pairs being eliminated. Held Thursday, 28 September 2000.

| Rank | Rider | Horse | Nation | Penalties | | | | | Notes |
| Rank | Rider | Horse | Nation | Round 1 | Round 2 | Jump | Time | Total | Notes |
|---|---|---|---|---|---|---|---|---|---|
| 1 | Rodrigo Pessoa | Baloubet du Rouet | Brazil | 5.00 | 0.00 | 0.00 | 0.00 | 5.00 | Q |
| 2 | Alexandra Ledermann | Rochet M | France | 800 | 0.00 | 0.00 | 0.00 | 8.00 | Q |
| 3 | Khaled Al Eid | Khashm Al Aan | Saudi Arabia | 4.50 | 4.00 | 0.00 | 0.00 | 8.50 | Q |
| 4 | Ian Millar | Dorincord | Canada | 5.25 | 0.00 | 4.00 | 0.00 | 9.25 | Q |
| 5 | Jeroen Dubbeldam | Sjiem | Netherlands | 0.50 | 8.00 | 4.00 | 0.00 | 12.50 | Q |
| 6 | Thomas Velin | Carnute | Denmark | 4.75 | 0.00 | 8.00 | 0.00 | 12.75 | Q |
| 6 | Luiz Felipe De Azevedo | Ralph | Brazil | 4.75 | 8.00 | 0.00 | 0.00 | 12.75 | Q |
| 8 | Gianni Govoni | Las Vegas | Italy | 9.00 | 4.00 | 0.00 | 0.00 | 13.00 | Q |
| 9 | Markus Fuchs | Tinka's Boy | Switzerland | 5.25 | 0.00 | 8.00 | 0.00 | 13.25 | Q |
| 10 | Otto Becker | Cento | Germany | 14.00 | 0.00 | 0.00 | 0.00 | 14.00 | Q |
| 11 | Marcus Ehning | For Pleasure | Germany | 8.75 | 0.00 | 7.00 | 0.00 | 15.75 | Q |
| 12 | Jamie Coman | Zazu | Australia | 4.25 | 4.00 | 8.00 | 0.00 | 16.25 | Q |
| 13 | Thierry Pomel | Thor Des Chain | France | 8.50 | 4.00 | 4.00 | 0.00 | 16.50 | Q |
| 14 | Lars Nieberg | Esprit FRH | Germany | 9.50 | 8.00 | 0.00 | 0.00 | 17.50 | Q |
| 15 | Beat Maendli | Pozitano | Switzerland | 9.75 | 8.00 | 0.00 | 0.00 | 17.75 | Q |
| 16 | Willi Melliger | Calvaro V | Switzerland | 18.00 | 0.00 | 0.00 | 0.00 | 18.00 | Q |
| 17 | Samantha McIntosh | Royal Discover | New Zealand | 14.25 | 0.00 | 4.00 | 0.00 | 18.25 | Q |
| 18 | Albert Voorn | Lando | Netherlands | 12.00 | 4.00 | 4.00 | 0.00 | 20.00 | Q |
| 18 | Laura Kraut | Liberty | United States | 8.00 | 4.00 | 8.00 | 0.00 | 20.00 | Q |
| 20 | Bruce Goodin | Lenaro | New Zealand | 0.50 | 8.00 | 12.00 | 0.00 | 20.50 | Q |
| 21 | Jos Lansink | Carthago Z | Netherlands | 9.00 | 4.00 | 8.00 | 0.00 | 21.00 | Q |
| 21 | Phillipe Rozier | Barbarian | France | 5.00 | 4.00 | 12.00 | 0.00 | 21.00 | 3/NOC |
| 23 | Carlos Milthaler | As Schylok | Chile | 5.50 | 16.00 | 0.00 | 0.00 | 21.50 | Q |
| 24 | Tadayoshi Hayashi | Swanky | Japan | 5.75 | 8.00 | 8.00 | 0.00 | 21.75 | Q |
| 25 | Margie Goldstein Engle | Perin | United States | 16.00 | 0.00 | 8.00 | 0.00 | 24.00 | Q |
| 26 | Saleh Andre Sakakini | Careful | Egypt | 8.50 | 8.00 | 7.00 | 1.00 | 24.50 | Q |
| 27 | Maria Gretzer | Feliciano | Sweden | 4.50 | 20.25 | 0.00 | 0.00 | 24.75 | Q |
| 28 | Malin Baryard | Butterfly Flip | Sweden | 4.50 | 8.75 | 12.00 | 0.00 | 25.25 | Q |
| 29 | Michael Whitaker | Prince of Wales | Great Britain | 9.75 | 8.00 | 8.00 | 0.00 | 25.75 | Q |
| 30 | Santiago Lambre | Tlaloc | Mexico | 14.00 | 4.00 | 8.00 | 0.00 | 26.00 | Q |
| 31 | Martin Dopazo | Calwaro | Argentina | 2.25 | 12.25 | 12.00 | 0.00 | 26.50 | Q |
| 32 | Lauren Hough | Clasiko | United States | 12.50 | 8.00 | 8.00 | 0.00 | 28.50 | Q |
| 33 | John Whitaker | Calvaro | Great Britain | 24.75 | 0.00 | 4.00 | 0.00 | 28.75 | Q |
| 34 | Alfonso Carlos Romo | Montemorelos | Mexico | 9.25 | 8.00 | 12.00 | 0.00 | 29.25 | Q |
| 34 | Andre Johannpeter | Calei | Brazil | 5.25 | 8.00 | 16.00 | 0.00 | 29.25 | Q |
| 34 | Helena Lundbaeck | Mynta | Sweden | 17.25 | 4.00 | 8.00 | 0.00 | 29.25 | Q |
| 37 | Manuel Torres | Marco | Colombia | 13.50 | 12.00 | 4.00 | 0.00 | 29.50 | Q |
| 37 | Lesley McNaught | Dulf | Switzerland | 6.00 | 15.00 | 7.00 | 1.50 | 29.50 | 3/NOC |
| 37 | Lisen Bratt | Casanova | Sweden | 6.00 | 15.00 | 7.00 | 1.50 | 29.50 | 3/NOC |
| 40 | Geoff Billington | It's Otto | Great Britain | 10.25 | 12.75 | 8.00 | 0.00 | 31.00 | Q |
| 41 | Jan Tops | Roofs | Netherlands | 6.25 | 13.25 | 12.00 | 0.00 | 31.50 | 3/NOC |
| 42 | Ludo Philippaerts | Otterongo | Belgium | 16.00 | 8.00 | 8.00 | 0.00 | 32.00 | Q |
| 43 | Rutherford Latham | Bretzel | Spain | 5.50 | 14.00 | 12.00 | 0.75 | 32.25 | Q |
| 44 | Jonathan Asselin | Spirit | Canada | 14.50 | 12.00 | 8.00 | 0.00 | 34.50 | Q |
| 45 | Taizo Sugitani | Mania Jolly | Japan | 8.75 | 10.00 | 16.00 | 0.00 | 34.75 | Q |
| 46 | Rossen Raitchev | Premier Cru | Bulgaria | 12.50 | 16.00 | 8.00 | 0.00 | 36.50 | Q |
| 46 | Geoff Bloomfield | Money Talks | Australia | 12.50 | 8.00 | 16.00 | 0.00 | 36.50 | Q |
| 48 | Takeshi Shirai | Vicomte Du Mes | Japan | 9.00 | 8.00 | 20.00 | 0.00 | 37.00 | Q |
| 49 | Ludger Beerbaum | Goldfever 3 | Germany | 1.25 | 20.00 | 16.00 | 0.25 | 37.50 | 3/NOC |
| 50 | Anton-Martin Bauer | Equo | Austria | 24.50 | 8.00 | 8.00 | 0.00 | 40.50 | Q |
| 51 | Alvaro Miranda Neto | Aspen | Brazil | 24.75 | 4.00 | 12.00 | 0.00 | 40.75 | |
| 52 | Ron Easey | Rolling Thunder | Australia | 16.75 | 16.00 | 12.00 | 0.00 | 44.75 | |
| 53 | Carl Edwards | Bit More Candy | Great Britain | 14.75 | 12.50 | 20.00 | 0.00 | 47.25 | |
| 54 | Jerry Smit | Lux Z | Italy | 16.00 | 16.00 | 16.00 | 0.00 | 48.00 | |
| 55 | Peter Breakwell | Leonson | New Zealand | 20.75 | 12.00 | 16.00 | 0.00 | 48.75 | |
| 56 | Ali Nilforoshan | Campione | Iran | 18.50 | 12.00 | 20.00 | 0.00 | 50.50 | |
| 56 | Ricardo Jurado | Gismo | Spain | 22.50 | 8.00 | 20.00 | 0.00 | 50.50 | |
| 58 | Guenter Orschel | Excellent | Bulgaria | 22.25 | 16.00 | 12.00 | 0.50 | 50.75 | |
| 59 | Antonio Maurer | Mortero | Mexico | 12.00 | 16.00 | 24.00 | 0.00 | 52.00 | |
| 60 | Gavin Chester | Another Flood | Australia | 13.00 | 8.00 | 32.00 | 0.00 | 53.00 | |
| 61 | Toni Leviste | Ghandy | Philippines | 14.75 | 20.75 | 20.00 | 0.00 | 55.50 | |
| 62 | John Pearce | Vagabond | Canada | 26.00 | 12.00 | 20.00 | 0.00 | 58.00 | |
| 63 | Jay Hayes | Diva | Canada | 17.50 | 29.25 | 15.00 | 4.00 | 65.75 | |
| 64 | Luis Astolfi | Filias | Spain | 24.25 | 26.75 | 15.00 | 3.75 | 69.75 | |
| 65 | Kamal Bahamdan | Chanel | Saudi Arabia | 31.50 | 29.25 | 15.00 | 2.50 | 78.25 | |
| 66 | Ryuma Hirota | Man of Gold | Japan | 33.75 | 8.00 | 40.00 | 0.50 | 82.25 | |
| 67 | Joaquin Larrain | Jagermeister | Chile | 17.00 | 12.00 | Elim. (60.50) | | 89.50 | |
| 68 | Patrice Deleveau | Caucalis | France | 23.50 | 12.00 | Elim. (60.50) | | 96.00 | |
| 69 | Gigi Hewitt | Genevieve | Virgin Islands | 24.00 | 16.00 | Elim. (60.50) | | 100.50 | |
| 70 | Princess Haya bint Al Hussein | Lucilla | Jordan | 25.50 | 23.25 | Elim. (60.50) | | 109.25 | |
| 71 | Nona Garson | Rhythmical | United States | 79.75 | 16.00 | 20.00 | 0.00 | 115.75 | |
| 72 | Fernando Sarasola | Ennio | Spain | 16.50 | 20.00 | DNS | | DNF | |
| 72 | Fahad Al-Geaid | National Guard | Saudi Arabia | 59.75 | DNS | Did not advance | | | |
| 72 | Ramzy Al Duhami | Saif Al Adel | Saudi Arabia | 79.75 | DNS | Did not advance | | | |

=== Final round ===
==== Round A ====
All scores were reset to zero after the third qualifying round. Held Sunday, 1 October 2000. The top 20 riders and ties advanced to Round B of the finals.

| Rank | Rider | Horse | Nation | Penalties | | | Notes |
| Rank | Rider | Horse | Nation | Jump | Time | Total | Notes |
|---|---|---|---|---|---|---|---|
| 1 | Thomas Velin | Carnute | Denmark | 0.00 | 0.00 | 0.00 | Q |
| 1 | Jeroen Dubbeldam | Sjiem | Netherlands | 0.00 | 0.00 | 0.00 | Q |
| 1 | Khaled Al Eid | Khashm Al Aan | Saudi Arabia | 0.00 | 0.00 | 0.00 | Q |
| 1 | Rodrigo Pessoa | Baloubet du Rouet | Brazil | 0.00 | 0.00 | 0.00 | Q |
| 5 | Ludo Philippaerts | Otterongo | Belgium | 4.00 | 0.00 | 4.00 | Q |
| 5 | Andre Johannpeter | Calei | Brazil | 4.00 | 0.00 | 4.00 | Q |
| 5 | Margie Goldstein Engle | Perin | United States | 4.00 | 0.00 | 4.00 | Q |
| 5 | Albert Voorn | Lando | Netherlands | 4.00 | 0.00 | 4.00 | Q |
| 5 | Wilhelm Melliger | Calvaro V | Switzerland | 4.00 | 0.00 | 4.00 | Q |
| 5 | Marcus Ehning | For Pleasure | Germany | 4.00 | 0.00 | 4.00 | Q |
| 5 | Otto Becker | Cento | Germany | 4.00 | 0.00 | 4.00 | Q |
| 5 | Gianni Govoni | Las Vegas | Italy | 4.00 | 0.00 | 4.00 | Q |
| 5 | Ian Millar | Dorincord | Canada | 4.00 | 0.00 | 4.00 | Q |
| 14 | Lauren Hough | Clasiko | United States | 8.00 | 0.00 | 8.00 | Q |
| 14 | Maria Gretzer | Feliciano | Sweden | 8.00 | 0.00 | 8.00 | Q |
| 14 | Lars Nieberg | Esprit FRH | Germany | 8.00 | 0.00 | 8.00 | Q |
| 14 | Thierry Pomel | Thor Des Chain | France | 8.00 | 0.00 | 8.00 | Q |
| 14 | Alexandra Ledermann | Rochet M | France | 8.00 | 0.00 | 8.00 | Q |
| 19 | Beat Maendli | Pozitano | Switzerland | 7.00 | 2.00 | 9.00 | Q |
| 20 | Anton-Martin Bauer | Equo | Austria | 12.00 | 0.00 | 12.00 | Q |
| 20 | Geoff Bloomfield | Money Talks | Australia | 12.00 | 0.00 | 12.00 | Q |
| 20 | Rossen Raitchev | Premier Cru | Bulgaria | 12.00 | 0.00 | 12.00 | Q |
| 20 | Taizo Sugitani | Mania Jolly | Japan | 12.00 | 0.00 | 12.00 | Q |
| 20 | Jonathan Asselin | Spirit | Canada | 12.00 | 0.00 | 12.00 | Q |
| 20 | Geoff Billington | It's Otto | Great Britain | 12.00 | 0.00 | 12.00 | Q |
| 20 | Manuel Torres | Marco | Colombia | 12.00 | 0.00 | 12.00 | Q |
| 20 | Martin Dopazo | Calwaro | Argentina | 12.00 | 0.00 | 12.00 | Q |
| 20 | Malin Baryard | Butterfly Flip | Sweden | 12.00 | 0.00 | 12.00 | Q |
| 20 | Jos Lansink | Carthago Z | Netherlands | 12.00 | 0.00 | 12.00 | Q |
| 20 | Laura Kraut | Liberty | United States | 12.00 | 0.00 | 12.00 | Q |
| 20 | Markus Fuchs | Tinka's Boy | Switzerland | 12.00 | 0.00 | 12.00 | Q |
| 32 | Michael Whitaker | Prince of Wales | Great Britain | 12.00 | 0.50 | 12.50 | |
| 33 | Helena Lundbaeck | Mynta | Sweden | 16.00 | 0.00 | 16.00 | |
| 33 | John Whitaker | Calvaro | Great Britain | 16.00 | 0.00 | 16.00 | |
| 33 | Bruce Goodin | Lenaro | New Zealand | 16.00 | 0.00 | 16.00 | |
| 33 | Luiz Felipe De Azevedo | Ralph | Brazil | 16.00 | 0.00 | 16.00 | |
| 37 | Takeshi Shirai | Vicomte Du Mes | Japan | 16.00 | 0.25 | 16.25 | |
| 38 | Santiago Lambre | Tlaloc | Mexico | 16.00 | 0.50 | 16.50 | |
| 39 | Samantha McIntosh | Royal Discover | New Zealand | 15.00 | 2.00 | 17.00 | |
| 40 | Alfonso Carlos Romo | Montemorelos | Mexico | 16.00 | 1.50 | 17.50 | |
| 41 | Saleh Andre Sakakini | Careful | Egypt | 20.00 | 0.00 | 20.00 | |
| 42 | Carlos Milthaler | As Schylok | Chile | 20.00 | 0.75 | 20.75 | |
| 43 | Jamie Coman | Zazu | Australia | 19.00 | 3.00 | 22.00 | |
| 44 | Tadayoshi Hayashi | Swanky | Japan | 24.00 | 0.00 | 24.00 | |
| 45 | Rutherford Latham | Bretzel | Spain | DNF | | | |

==== Round B ====
The 12-way tie for 20th-place resulted in 31 pairs advancing to the second round of the final. A jump-off was required to break the ties for the medals.

| Rank | Rider | Horse | Nation | Round A | Round B penalties | | | Total | Notes |
| Rank | Rider | Horse | Nation | Round A | Jump | Time | Total | Total | Notes |
|---|---|---|---|---|---|---|---|---|---|
| 1 | Jeroen Dubbeldam | Sjiem | Netherlands | 0.00 | 4.00 | 0.00 | 4.00 | 4.00 | Q |
| 1 | Albert Voorn | Lando | Netherlands | 4.00 | 0.00 | 0.00 | 0.00 | 4.00 | Q |
| 1 | Khaled Al Eid | Khashm Al Aan | Saudi Arabia | 0.00 | 4.00 | 0.00 | 4.00 | 4.00 | Q |
| 4 | Lars Nieberg | Esprit FRH | Germany | 8.00 | 0.00 | 0.00 | 0.00 | 8.00 | |
| 4 | Ludo Philippaerts | Otterongo | Belgium | 4.00 | 4.00 | 0.00 | 4.00 | 8.00 | |
| 4 | Andre Johannpeter | Calei | Brazil | 4.00 | 4.00 | 0.00 | 4.00 | 8.00 | |
| 4 | Marcus Ehning | For Pleasure | Germany | 400 | 4.00 | 0.00 | 4.00 | 8.00 | |
| 4 | Otto Becker | Cento | Germany | 4.00 | 4.00 | 0.00 | 4.00 | 8.00 | |
| 9 | Beat Maendli | Pozitano | Switzerland | 9.00 | 0.00 | 0.00 | 0.00 | 9.00 | |
| 10 | Margie Goldstein Engle | Perin | United States | 4.00 | 8.00 | 0.00 | 8.00 | 12.00 | |
| 10 | Willi Melliger | Calvaro V | Switzerland | 4.00 | 8.00 | 0.00 | 8.00 | 12.00 | |
| 10 | Thomas Velin | Carnute | Denmark | 0.00 | 12.00 | 0.00 | 12.00 | 12.00 | |
| 13 | Ian Millar | Dorincord | Canada | 4.00 | 8.00 | 0.25 | 8.25 | 12.25 | |
| 14 | Manuel Torres | Marco | Colombia | 12.00 | 0.00 | 1.25 | 1.25 | 13.25 | |
| 15 | Jonathan Asselin | Spirit | Canada | 12.00 | 4.00 | 0.00 | 4.00 | 16.00 | |
| 15 | Lauren Hough | Clasiko | United States | 8.00 | 8.00 | 0.00 | 8.00 | 16.00 | |
| 15 | Maria Gretzer | Feliciano | Sweden | 8.00 | 8.00 | 0.00 | 8.00 | 16.00 | |
| 18 | Martin Dopazo | Calwaro | Argentina | 12.00 | 4.00 | 1.50 | 5.50 | 17.50 | |
| 18 | Gianni Govoni | Las Vegas | Italy | 4.00 | 11.00 | 2.50 | 13.50 | 17.50 | |
| 20 | Geoff Bloomfield | Money Talks | Australia | 12.00 | 8.00 | 0.00 | 8.00 | 20.00 | |
| 20 | Rossen Raitchev | Premier Cru | Bulgaria | 12.00 | 8.00 | 0.00 | 8.00 | 20.00 | |
| 20 | Malin Baryard | Butterfly Flip | Sweden | 12.00 | 8.00 | 0.00 | 8.00 | 20.00 | |
| 20 | Jos Lansink | Carthago Z | Netherlands | 12.00 | 8.00 | 0.00 | 8.00 | 20.00 | |
| 24 | Geoff Billington | It's Otto | Great Britain | 12.00 | 12.00 | 0.00 | 12.00 | 24.00 | |
| 25 | Taizo Sugitani | Mania Jolly | Japan | 12.00 | 12.00 | 0.50 | 12.50 | 24.50 | |
| 26 | Anton-Martin Bauer | Equo | Austria | 12.00 | 16.00 | 0.00 | 16.00 | 28.00 | |
| 27 | Rodrigo Pessoa | Baloubet du Rouet | Brazil | 0.00 | Elim. | | | | |
| 28 | Thierry Pomel | Thor Des Chain | France | 8.00 | DNF | | | | |
| 28 | Alexandra Ledermann | Rochet M | France | 8.00 | DNF | | | | |
| 28 | Laura Kraut | Liberty | United States | 12.00 | DNS | | | DNF | |
| 28 | Markus Fuchs | Tinka's Boy | Switzerland | 12.00 | DNS | | | DNF | |

==== Jump-off ====
| Rank | Rider | Horse | Nation | Jump penalties | Time |
|---|---|---|---|---|---|
| 1st place, gold medalist(s) | Jeroen Dubbeldam | Sjiem | Netherlands | 0.00 | 50.65 |
| 2nd place, silver medalist(s) | Albert Voorn | Lando | Netherlands | 4.00 | 44.72 |
| 3rd place, bronze medalist(s) | Khaled Al Eid | Khashm Al Aan | Saudi Arabia | 4.00 | 44.86 |

== Sources ==
- Official Report of the 2000 Sydney Summer Olympics available at https://web.archive.org/web/20060622162855/http://www.la84foundation.org/5va/reports_frmst.htm
