= Equestrian at the 2000 Summer Olympics – Team jumping =

Team jumping at the Games of the XXVII Olympiad
- Venue: Sydney International Equestrian Centre
- Date: 28 September 2000
- Competitors: 54 teams from 14 nations

Medalists
1st place, gold medalist(s)		Marcus Ehning, Otto Becker, Lars Nieberg, Ludger Beerbaum	Germany
2nd place, silver medalist(s)		Lesley McNaught, Markus Fuchs, Beat Maendli, Willi Melliger	Switzerland
3rd place, bronze medalist(s)		Luiz Felipe De Azevedo, Andre Johannpeter, Alvaro Miranda Neto, Rodrigo Pessoa	Brazil

The team jumping event, part of the equestrian program at the 2000 Summer Olympics was held on 28 September 2000 at the Sydney International Equestrian Centre 45 miles outside of Sydney, Australia. The results of the second and third round of the individual jumping were used to award rankings. Like all other equestrian events, the competition was mixed gender, with both male and female athletes competing in the same division. Fourteen teams, each consisting of four horse and rider pairs, entered the contest.

== Results ==
=== Round 1 ===
Each team consisted of four pairs of horse and rider. The penalty points of the lowest three pairs were added together to reach the team's penalty points.

Rank	NOC	Rider	Horse	Scored	Jump	Time	Total	Team Total
1	Germany	Marcus Ehning	For Pleasure	#	0.00	0.00	0.00	8.00
1	Germany	Otto Becker	Cento	#	0.00	0.00	0.00	8.00
1	Germany	Lars Nieberg	Esprit FRH	#	8.00	0.00	8.00	8.00
1	Germany	Ludger Beerbaum	Goldfever 3		20.00	0.00	20.00	8.00
1	Switzerland	Lesley McNaught	Dulf		11.00	4.00	15.00	8.00
1	Switzerland	Markus Fuchs	Tinka's Boy	#	0.00	0.00	0.00	8.00
1	Switzerland	Beat Maendli	Pozitano	#	8.00	0.00	8.00	8.00
1	Switzerland	Willi Melliger	Calvaro V	#	0.00	0.00	0.00	8.00
1	France	Alexandra Ledermann	Rochet M	#	0.00	0.00	0.00	8.00
1	France	Patrice Deleveau	Caucalis		12.00	0.00	12.00	8.00
1	France	Thierry Pomel	Thor Des Chain	#	4.00	0.00	4.00	8.00
1	France	Phillipe Rozier	Barbarian	#	4.00	0.00	4.00	8.00
4	Brazil	Luiz Felipe De Azevedo	Ralph	#	8.00	0.00	8.00	12.00
4	Brazil	Andre Johannpeter	Calei		8.00	0.00	8.00	12.00
4	Brazil	Alvaro Miranda Neto	Aspen	#	4.00	0.00	4.00	12.00
4	Brazil	Rodrigo Pessoa	Baloubet du Rouet	#	0.00	0.00	0.00	12.00
4	United States	Laura Kraut	Liberty	#	4.00	0.00	4.00	12.00
4	United States	Lauren Hough	Clasiko	#	8.00	0.00	8.00	12.00
4	United States	Nona Garson	Rhythmical		16.00	0.00	16.00	12.00
4	United States	Margie Goldstein Engle	Perin	#	0.00	0.00	0.00	12.00
6	Netherlands	Albert Voorn	Lando	#	4.00	0.00	4.00	16.00
6	Netherlands	Jeroen Dubbeldam	Sjiem	#	8.00	0.00	8.00	16.00
6	Netherlands	Jan Tops	Roofs		11.00	2.25	13.25	16.00
6	Netherlands	Jos Lansink	Carthago Z	#	4.00	0.00	4.00	16.00
7	Sweden	Malin Baryard	Butterfly Flip	#	7.00	1.75	8.75	16.75
7	Sweden	Lisen Bratt	Casanova	#	4.00	0.00	4.00	16.75
7	Sweden	Helena Lundbaeck	Mynta	#	4.00	0.00	4.00	16.75
7	Sweden	Maria Gretzer	Feliciano		19.00	1.25	20.25	16.75
8	Australia	Jamie Coman	Zazu	#	4.00	0.00	4.00	20.00
8	Australia	Ron Easey	Rolling Thunder		16.00	0.00	16.00	20.00
8	Australia	Geoff Bloomfield	Money Talks	#	8.00	0.00	8.00	20.00
8	Australia	Gavin Chester	Another Flood	#	8.00	0.00	8.00	20.00
9	Great Britain	Michael Whitaker	Prince of Wales	#	8.00	0.00	8.00	20.50
9	Great Britain	Geoff Billington	It's Otto		11.00	1.75	12.75	20.50
9	Great Britain	Carl Edwards	Bit More Candy	#	12.00	0.50	12.50	20.50
9	Great Britain	John Whitaker	Calvaro	#	0.00	0.00	0.00	20.50
10	Canada	Jay Hayes	Diva		27.00	2.25	29.25	24.00
10	Canada	Jonathan Asselin	Spirit	#	12.00	0.00	12.00	24.00
10	Canada	John Pearce	Vagabond	#	12.00	0.00	12.00	24.00
10	Canada	Ian Millar	Dorincord	#	0.00	0.00	0.00	24.00
10	Japan	Tadayoshi Hayashi	Swanky	#	8.00	0.00	8.00	24.00
10	Japan	Ryuma Hirota	Man of Gold	#	8.00	0.00	8.00	24.00
10	Japan	Takeshi Shirai	Vicomte Du Mes	#	8.00	0.00	8.00	24.00
10	Japan	Taizo Sugitani	Mania Jolly		7.00	3.00	10.00	24.00
12	Mexico	Antonio Maurer	Mortero	#	16.00	0.00	16.00	28.00
12	Mexico	Alfonso Carlos Romo	Montemorelos	#	8.00	0.00	8.00	28.00
12	Mexico	Santiago Lambre	Tlaloc	#	4.00	0.00	4.00	28.00
13	Bulgaria	Rossen Raitchev	Premier Cru	#	16.00	0.00	16.00	32.00
13	Bulgaria	Samantha McIntosh	Royal Discover	#	0.00	0.00	0.00	32.00
13	Bulgaria	Guenter Orschel	Excellent	#	16.00	0.00	16.00	32.00
14	Spain	Luis Astolfi	Filias		23.00	3.75	26.75	42.00
14	Spain	Ricardo Jurado	Gismo	#	8.00	0.00	8.00	42.00
14	Spain	Rutherford Latham	Bretzel	#	11.00	3.00	14.00	42.00
14	Spain	Fernando Sarasola	Ennio	#	20.00	0.00	20.00	42.00

=== Round 2 ===
Each team consisted of four pairs of horse and rider. The penalty points of the lowest three pairs were added together to reach the team's penalty points.

Rank	NOC	Rider	Horse	Scored	Jump	Time	Total	Team Total
1	Germany	Marcus Ehning	For Pleasure	#	7.00	0.00	7.00	7.00
1	Germany	Otto Becker	Cento	#	0.00	0.00	0.00	7.00
1	Germany	Lars Nieberg	Esprit FRH	#	0.00	0.00	8.00	7.00
1	Germany	Ludger Beerbaum	Goldfever 3		16.00	0.25	16.25	7.00
2	Switzerland	Lesley McNaught	Dulf		7.00	1.50	8.50	8.00
2	Switzerland	Markus Fuchs	Tinka's Boy	#	8.00	0.00	8.00	8.00
2	Switzerland	Beat Maendli	Pozitano	#	0.00	0.00	0.00	8.00
2	Switzerland	Willi Melliger	Calvaro V	#	0.00	0.00	0.00	8.00
3	Brazil	Luiz Felipe De Azevedo	Ralph	#	0.00	0.00	0.00	12.00
3	Brazil	Andre Johannpeter	Calei		16.00	0.00	16.00	12.00
3	Brazil	Alvaro Miranda Neto	Aspen	#	12.00	0.00	12.00	12.00
3	Brazil	Rodrigo Pessoa	Baloubet du Rouet	#	0.00	0.00	0.00	12.00
4	France	Alexandra Ledermann	Rochet M	#	0.00	0.00	0.00	16.00
4	France	Patrice Deleveau	Caucalis				EL	16.00
4	France	Thierry Pomel	Thor Des Chain	#	4.00	0.00	4.00	16.00
4	France	Phillipe Rozier	Barbarian	#	12.00	0.00	12.00	16.00
4	Netherlands	Albert Voorn	Lando	#	4.00	0.00	4.00	16.00
4	Netherlands	Jeroen Dubbeldam	Sjiem	#	4.00	0.00	4.00	16.00
4	Netherlands	Jan Tops	Roofs		12.00	0.00	12.00	16.00
4	Netherlands	Jos Lansink	Carthago Z	#	8.00	0.00	8.00	16.00
6	Sweden	Malin Baryard	Butterfly Flip	#	12.00	0.00	12.00	20.00
6	Sweden	Lisen Bratt	Casanova		12.00	0.00	12.00	20.00
6	Sweden	Helena Lundbaeck	Mynta	#	8.00	0.00	8.00	20.00
6	Sweden	Maria Gretzer	Feliciano	#	0.00	0.00	0.00	20.00
6	Great Britain	Michael Whitaker	Prince of Wales	#	8.00	0.00	8.00	20.00
6	Great Britain	Geoff Billington	It's Otto	#	8.00	0.00	8.00	20.00
6	Great Britain	Carl Edwards	Bit More Candy		20.00	0.00	20.00	20.00
6	Great Britain	John Whitaker	Calvaro	#	4.00	0.00	4.00	20.00
8	United States	Laura Kraut	Liberty	#	8.00	0.00	8.00	24.00
8	United States	Lauren Hough	Clasiko	#	8.00	0.00	8.00	24.00
8	United States	Nona Garson	Rhythmical		20.00	0.00	20.00	24.00
8	United States	Margie Goldstein Engle	Perin	#	8.00	0.00	8.00	24.00
9	Canada	Jay Hayes	Diva	#	15.00	4.00	19.00	31.00
9	Canada	Jonathan Asselin	Spirit	#	8.00	0.00	8.00	31.00
9	Canada	John Pearce	Vagabond		20.00	0.00	20.00	31.00
9	Canada	Ian Millar	Dorincord	#	4.00	0.00	4.00	31.00
10	Australia	Jamie Coman	Zazu	#	8.00	0.00	8.00	36.00
10	Australia	Ron Easey	Rolling Thunder	#	12.00	0.00	12.00	36.00
10	Australia	Geoff Bloomfield	Money Talks	#	16.00	0.00	16.00	36.00
10	Australia	Gavin Chester	Another Flood		32.00	0.00	32.00	36.00
11	Japan	Tadayoshi Hayashi	Swanky	#	8.00	0.00	8.00	44.00
11	Japan	Ryuma Hirota	Man of Gold		40.00	0.50	40.50	44.00
11	Japan	Takeshi Shirai	Vicomte Du Mes	#	20.00	0.00	20.00	44.00
11	Japan	Taizo Sugitani	Mania Jolly	#	16.00	0.00	16.00	44.00

=== Bronze Medal Jump Off ===
Rank	NOC	Rider	Horse	Jump	Time	Team Total
1	Brazil	Luiz Felipe De Azevedo	Ralph	0.00	45.72	0.00/148.16
1	Brazil	Andre Johannpeter	Calei	0.00	52.13	0.00/148.16
1	Brazil	Alvaro Miranda Neto	Aspen	8.00	52.46	0.00/148.16
1	Brazil	Rodrigo Pessoa	Baloubet du Rouet	0.00	50.31	0.00/148.16
4	France	Alexandra Ledermann	Rochet M	8.00	51.58	8.00/95.36
4	France	Patrice Deleveau	Caucalis			8.00/95.36
4	France	Thierry Pomel	Thor Des Chain	0.00	43.78	8.00/95.36
4	France	Phillipe Rozier	Barbarian			8.00/95.36

=== Final standings ===
Rank	NOC	Rider	Horse	Scored	Round 1	Scored	Round 2	Total	Team Total
1	Germany	Marcus Ehning	For Pleasure	#	0.00	#	7.00	7.00	15.00
1	Germany	Otto Becker	Cento	#	0.00	#	0.00	0.00	15.00
1	Germany	Lars Nieberg	Esprit FRH	#	8.00	#	0.00	8.00	15.00
1	Germany	Ludger Beerbaum	Goldfever 3		20.00		16.25	36.25	15.00
2	Switzerland	Lesley McNaught	Dulf		15.00		8.50	23.50	16.00
2	Switzerland	Markus Fuchs	Tinka's Boy	#	0.00	#	8.00	8.00	16.00
2	Switzerland	Beat Maendli	Pozitano	#	8.00	#	0.00	8.00	16.00
2	Switzerland	Willi Melliger	Calvaro V	#	0.00	#	0.00	0.00	16.00
3	Brazil	Luiz Felipe De Azevedo	Ralph	#	8.00	#	0.00	8.00	24.00
3	Brazil	Andre Johannpeter	Calei		8.00		16.00	24.00	24.00
3	Brazil	Alvaro Miranda Neto	Aspen	#	4.00	#	12.00	16.00	24.00
3	Brazil	Rodrigo Pessoa	Baloubet du Rouet	#	0.00	#	0.00	0.00	24.00
4	France	Alexandra Ledermann	Rochet M	#	0.00	#	8.00	0.00	24.00
4	France	Patrice Deleveau	Caucalis		12.00		EL	72.50	24.00
4	France	Thierry Pomel	Thor Des Chain	#	4.00	#	4.00	8.00	24.00
4	France	Phillipe Rozier	Barbarian	#	4.00	#	12.00	16.00	24.00
5	Netherlands	Albert Voorn	Lando	#	4.00	#	4.00	8.00	32.00
5	Netherlands	Jeroen Dubbeldam	Sjiem	#	8.00	#	4.00	12.00	32.00
5	Netherlands	Jan Tops	Roofs		13.25		12.00	25.25	32.00
5	Netherlands	Jos Lansink	Carthago Z	#	4.00	#	8.00	12.00	32.00
6	United States	Laura Kraut	Liberty	#	4.00	#	8.00	12.00	36.00
6	United States	Lauren Hough	Clasiko	#	8.00	#	8.00	16.00	36.00
6	United States	Nona Garson	Rhythmical		16.00		20.00	36.00	36.00
6	United States	Margie Goldstein Engle	Perin	#	0.00	#	8.00	8.00	36.00
7	Sweden	Malin Baryard	Butterfly Flip	#	8.75	#	12.00	20.75	36.75
7	Sweden	Lisen Bratt	Casanova	#	4.00	#	12.00	16.00	36.75
7	Sweden	Helena Lundbaeck	Mynta	#	4.00	#	8.00	12.00	36.75
7	Sweden	Maria Gretzer	Feliciano		20.25	#	0.00	20.25	36.75
8	Great Britain	Michael Whitaker	Prince of Wales	#	8.00	#	8.00	16.00	40.50
8	Great Britain	Geoff Billington	It's Otto		12.75	#	8.00	20.75	40.50
8	Great Britain	Carl Edwards	Bit More Candy	#	12.50		20.00	32.50	40.50
8	Great Britain	John Whitaker	Calvaro	#	0.00	#	4.00	4.00	40.50
9	Canada	Jay Hayes	Diva		29.25	#	19.00	48.25	55.00
9	Canada	Jonathan Asselin	Spirit	#	12.00	#	8.00	20.00	55.00
9	Canada	John Pearce	Vagabond	#	12.00		20.00	32.00	55.00
9	Canada	Ian Millar	Dorincord	#	0.00	#	4.00	4.00	55.00
10	Australia	Jamie Coman	Zazu	#	4.00	#	8.00	12.00	56.00
10	Australia	Ron Easey	Rolling Thunder		16.00	#	12.00	28.00	56.00
10	Australia	Geoff Bloomfield	Money Talks	#	8.00	#	16.00	24.00	56.00
10	Australia	Gavin Chester	Another Flood	#	8.00		32.00	40.00	56.00
11	Japan	Tadayoshi Hayashi	Swanky	#	8.00	#	8.00	16.00	68.00
11	Japan	Ryuma Hirota	Man of Gold	#	8.00		40.50	48.50	68.00
11	Japan	Takeshi Shirai	Vicomte Du Mes	#	8.00	#	20.00	28.00	68.00
11	Japan	Taizo Sugitani	Mania Jolly		10.00	#	16.00	26.00	68.00
12	Mexico	Antonio Maurer	Mortero	#	16.00	28.00			
12	Mexico	Alfonso Carlos Romo	Montemorelos	#	8.00	28.00			
12	Mexico	Santiago Lambre	Tlaloc	#	4.00	28.00			
13	Bulgaria	Rossen Raitchev	Premier Cru	#	16.00	32.00			
13	Bulgaria	Samantha McIntosh	Royal Discover	#	0.00	32.00			
13	Bulgaria	Guenter Orschel	Excellent	#	16.00	32.00			
14	Spain	Luis Astolfi	Filias		26.75	42.00			
14	Spain	Ricardo Jurado	Gismo	#	8.00	42.00			
14	Spain	Rutherford Latham	Bretzel	#	14.00	42.00			
14	Spain	Fernando Sarasola	Ennio	#	20.00	42.00			
