= Sweden at the 2000 Summer Olympics =

- IOC code: SWE
- NOC: Swedish Olympic Committee
- Website: www.sok.se (in Swedish and English)

in Sydney
- Competitors: 150 (98 men and 52 women) in 22 sports
- Flag bearers: Anna Olsson, flatwater canoeing
- Medals Ranked 18th: Gold 4 Silver 5 Bronze 3 Total 12

Summer Olympics appearances (overview)
- 1896; 1900; 1904; 1908; 1912; 1920; 1924; 1928; 1932; 1936; 1948; 1952; 1956; 1960; 1964; 1968; 1972; 1976; 1980; 1984; 1988; 1992; 1996; 2000; 2004; 2008; 2012; 2016; 2020; 2024; 2028

Other related appearances
- 1906 Intercalated Games

Sweden's entry at the 2000 Summer Olympics in Sydney, Australia consisted of 150 competitors (98 men and 52 women) who took part in 92 events in 22 sports.

== Medalists ==
Medal	Name	Sport	Event	Date
Gold	Pia Hansen	Shooting	Women's double trap	19 September
Gold	Jonas Edman	Shooting	Men's 50 m rifle prone	21 September
Gold	Lars Frölander	Swimming	Men's 100 m butterfly	21 September
Gold	Mikael Ljungberg	Wrestling	Men's Greco-Roman 97 kg	26 September
Silver	Therese Alshammar	Swimming	Women's 100 m freestyle	20 September
Silver	Therese Alshammar	Swimming	Women's 50 m freestyle	23 September
Silver	Jan-Ove Waldner	Table tennis	Men's singles	25 September
Silver	Henrik Nilsson; Markus Oscarsson	Canoeing	Men's K-2 1000 m	30 September
Silver	Sweden men's national handball team: Magnus Andersson; Mattias Andersson; Martin Boquist; Mathias Franzén; Martin Frändesjö; Peter Gentzel; Andreas Larsson; Ola Lindgren; Stefan Lövgren; Staffan Olsson; Johan Petersson; Tomas Sivertsson; Tomas Svensson; Pierre Thorsson; Ljubomir Vranjes; Magnus Wislander	Handball	Men's competition	30 September
Bronze	Therese Alshammar; Louise Jöhncke; Anna-Karin Kammerling; Josefin Lillhage; Johanna Sjöberg; Malin Svahnström	Swimming	Women's 4 × 100 m freestyle relay	16 September
Bronze	Kajsa Bergqvist	Athletics	Women's high jump	30 September
Bronze	Fredrik Lööf	Sailing	Men's Finn class	

== Archery ==
Athlete	Event	Ranking round		Round of 64	Round of 32	Round of 16	Quarterfinals	Semifinals	Final	
Athlete	Event	Score	Seed	Opposition Score	Opposition Score	Opposition Score	Opposition Score	Opposition Score	Opposition Score	Rank
Mattias Eriksson	Men's individual	616	42	Shikarev (KAZ); L 156–158	Did not advance					
Niklas Eriksson	Men's individual	629	28	Rusnow (CAN); L 155–161	Did not advance					
Magnus Petersson	Men's individual	646	6	Pombo (POR); W 165–146	Tang (CHN); W 157–148	Yang (CHN); W 167–164	Kim C-t (KOR); W 112–111	Wunderle (USA); L 107–108	van Alten (NED); L 109–114	4
Mattias Eriksson; Niklas Eriksson; Magnus Petersson	Men's team	1891	7	—N/a		Australia; W 241–238	United States; L 244–255	Did not advance		6
Petra Ericsson	Women's individual	646	9	Martínez (CUB); W 154–146	Nowicka (POL); L 152–162	Did not advance				
Karin Larsson	Women's individual	626	34	Wagner-Sachse (GER); W 147–146	Valeeva (ITA); L 160–162	Did not advance				
Kristina Nordlander	Women's individual	618	45	Williamson (GBR); L 145–156	Did not advance					
Petra Ericsson; Karin Larsson; Kristina Nordlander	Women's team	1890	8	—N/a		United States; L 230–242	Did not advance			

== Athletics ==
=== Men's track ===
Athlete	Event	Heat		Quarterfinal		Semifinal		Final	
Athlete	Event	Result	Rank	Result	Rank	Result	Rank	Result	Rank
Robert Kronberg	110m hurdles	13.58	12 Q	13.56	10 Q	13.39	7 Q	13.61	8

=== Men's field ===
Athlete	Event	Qualification		Final	
Athlete	Event	Distance	Position	Distance	Position
Stefan Holm	High jump	2.27	=1 q	=2.32	4
Staffan Strand	High jump	2.27	=7 q	2.32	=6
Patrik Bodén	Javelin throw	78.06	23	Did not advance	
Peter Häggström	Long jump	7.83	24	Did not advance	
Mattias Sunneborn	Long jump	7.63	29	Did not advance	
Martin Eriksson	Pole vault	5.55	=22	Did not advance	
Patrik Kristiansson	Pole vault	5.55	=20	Did not advance	
Christian Olsson	Triple jump	16.64	17	Did not advance	

Athlete	Event	100 m	LJ	SP	HJ	400 m	110H	DT	PV	JT	1500 m	Final	Rank
Henrik Dagård	Result	10.84	7.08	14.97	1.94	48.75	14.30	42.95	5.10	65.05	4:49.51	8178 SB	10
Henrik Dagård	Points	897	833	788	749	873	936	725	941	814	622	8178 SB	10

=== Women's field ===
Athlete	Event	Qualification		Final	
Athlete	Event	Distance	Position	Distance	Position
Anna Söderberg	Discus throw	56.11	24	Did not advance	
Kajsa Bergqvist	High jump	1.94	=1 Q	1.99	3rd place, bronze medalist(s)
Erica Johansson	Long jump	6.53	16	Did not advance	
Camille Johansson	Triple jump	13.87	17	Did not advance	

=== Wheelchair racing (demonstration) ===
Athlete	Event	Heat		Quarterfinal		Semifinal		Final	
Athlete	Event	Result	Rank	Result	Rank	Result	Rank	Result	Rank
Madeleine Nordlund	Women's 800m wheelchair	—N/a						1:57.82	8

== Badminton ==
Athlete	Event	Round of 32	Round of 16	Quarterfinals	Semifinals	Final	
Athlete	Event	Opposition Score	Opposition Score	Opposition Score	Opposition Score	Opposition Score	Rank
Tomas Johansson	Men's singles	Mainaky (INA); L 11–15, 16–17	Did not advance				
Rasmus Wengberg	Men's singles	Vaughan (GBR); L 8–15, 4–15	Did not advance				
Peter Axelsson; Pär-Gunnar Jönsson	Men's doubles	Helber / Siegemund (GER); W 15–7, 17–15	Hiang / Limpele (INA); L 12–15, 11–15	Did not advance			
Fredrik Bergström; Jenny Karlsson	Mixed doubles	Chuen / Chee Louisa (HKG); W 15–13, 10–15, 15–12	Zhang / Gao (CHN); L 6–15, 7–15	Did not advance			

== Beach volleyball ==
Athlete	Event	Preliminary round	Preliminary elimination	Round of 16	Quarterfinals	Semifinals	Final
Athlete	Event	Opposition Score	Opposition Score	Opposition Score	Opposition Score	Opposition Score	Rank
Björn Berg; Simon Dahl	Men's	de Melo – Santos (BRA); L 5-15	Bosma – Diez (ESP); L 11-15	Did not advance			=19

== Canoeing ==
Men

Athlete	Event	Heats		Semifinals		Final	
Athlete	Event	Time	Rank	Time	Rank	Time	Rank
Anders Svensson	K-1 500m	1:43.349	21 Q	1:43.070	18	Did not advance	
Johan Eriksson	K-1 1000m	3:40.190	16 Q	3:43.359	17	Did not advance	
Henrik Nilsson; Markus Oscarsson	K-2 500m	1:30.051	1 Q	Bye		1:56.301	9
Henrik Nilsson; Markus Oscarsson	K-2 1000m	3:15.102	5 Q	Bye		3:16.075	2nd place, silver medalist(s)
Jonas Fager; Anders Gustafsson; Erik Lindeberg; Niklaes Persson	K-4 1000m	3:04.420	9 Q	3:02.611	2 Q	3:01.326	8

Women

Athlete	Event	Heats		Semifinals		Final	
Athlete	Event	Time	Rank	Time	Rank	Time	Rank
Anna Olsson	K-1 500m	1:52.785	6 Q	Bye		2:24.774	9
Anna Olsson; Ingela Ericsson	K-2 500m	1:45.491	7 Q	Bye		2:04.574	8

== Cycling ==
=== Road cycling ===
Athlete	Event	Time	Rank
Magnus Bäckstedt	Road race	DNF	
Michel Lafis	Road race	DNF	
Glenn Magnusson	Road race	–	28
Martin Rittsel	Road race	DNF	
Michael Andersson	Time trial	1:05:19	37
Martin Rittsel	Time trial	1:01:59	30

== Diving ==
Athlete	Event	Preliminaries		Semifinals				Final			
Athlete	Event	Points	Rank	Points	Rank	Total	Rank	Points	Rank	Total	Rank
Anna Lindberg	Women's 3m springboard	275.34	11	233.34	6	508.68	9	325.83	5	559.17	5

== Equestrianism ==
=== Dressage ===
Athlete	Horse	Event	Grand Prix		Grand Prix Special			Grand Prix Freestyle		Overall	
Athlete	Horse	Event	Score	Rank	Score	Total	Rank	Score	Rank	Score	Rank
Jan Brink	Briar	Individual	62.92	40	Did not advance						
Ulla Hakanson	Bobby	Individual	Withdrew								
Pether Markne	Amiral	Individual	65.20	28	Did not advance						
Tinne Vilhelmson-Silfvén	Cezar	Individual	65.84	22 Q	58.18	124.02	25	Did not advance			
Jan Brink; Ulla Hakanson; Pether Markne; Tinne Vilhelmson-Silfvén	See above	Team	4849	9	—N/a					4849	9

=== Eventing ===
Athlete	Horse	Event	Dressage		Cross-country		Showjumping		Total	
Athlete	Horse	Event	Penalties	Rank	Penalties	Rank	Penalties	Rank	Penalties	Rank
Sofia Andler	Amaretto	Individual	39.8	5	Did not advance					
Paula Törnqvist	Monaghan	Individual	60.6	31	2.8	14	11.0	19	74.4	14

=== Jumping ===
Athlete	Horse	Event	Qualification								Final					Total	
Athlete	Horse	Event	Round 1		Round 2			Round 3			Round A		Round B			Total	
Athlete	Horse	Event	Penalties	Rank	Penalties	Total	Rank	Penalties	Total	Rank	Penalties	Rank	Penalties	Total	Rank	Penalties	Rank
Malin Baryard	Butterfly Flip	Individual	4.50	6	8.75	13.25	17	12.00	25.25	28 Q	12.00	20	16.00	20.00	20	20.00	20
Lisen Bratt	Casanova	Individual	13.50	41	4.00	17.50	28	8.50	29.50	37	Did not advance						
Maria Gretzer	Feliciano	Individual	4.50	6	20.25	24.75	46	0.00	24.75	27 Q	8.00	14	8.00	16.00	15	16.00	15
Helena Lundbäck	Mynta	Individual	17.25	55	4.00	21.25	41	12.00	29.25	34 Q	16.00	33	Did not advance				
Malin Baryard; Lisen Bratt; Maria Gretzer; Helena Lundbäck	See above	Team	16.75	7	20.00	36.75	6	—N/a								36.75	7

== Fencing ==
Athlete	Event	Round of 32	Round of 16	Quarterfinal	Semifinal	Final	
Athlete	Event	Opposition Score	Opposition Score	Opposition Score	Opposition Score	Opposition Score	Rank
Péter Vánky	Men's épée	Pchenikin (BLR); W 15–9	Milanoli (ITA); W 15–6	Obry (FRA); L 12–15	Did not advance		

== Football ==
Summary

Key:

- W – Win D – Draw L – Loss
- A.E.T – After extra time.
- P – Match decided by penalty-shootout.

Team	Event	Group Stage				Quarterfinal	Semifinal	Final / BM	
Team	Event	Opposition Score	Opposition Score	Opposition Score	Rank	Opposition Score	Opposition Score	Opposition Score	Rank
Sweden women's	Women's tournament	Brazil; L 0–2	Australia; D 1–1	Germany; L 0–1	3	—N/a	Did not qualify		6

=== Women's tournament ===
Team Roster

- Malin Andersson
- Kristin Bengtsson
- Sara Call
- Linda Fagerström
- Sara Johansson
- Caroline Jönsson
- Ulrika Karlsson
- Sara Larsson
- Hanna Ljungberg
- Åsa Lönnqvist
- Hanna Marklund
- Malin Moström
- Tina Nordlund
- Cecilia Sandell
- Therese Sjögran
- Victoria Svensson
- Malin Swedberg
- Ulla-Karin Thelin
- Jane Törnqvist
- Karolina Westberg

Group stage

Team	Pld	W	D	L	GF	GA	GD	Pts
Germany	3	3	0	0	6	1	+5	9
Brazil	3	2	0	1	5	3	+2	6
Sweden	3	0	1	2	1	4	−3	1
Australia	3	0	1	2	2	6	−4	1

13 September 2000
17:00

Sweden	0–2	Brazil
	Report	Pretinha 21'; Kátia 70'

Melbourne Cricket Ground, Melbourne
Attendance: 58,432
Referee: Sandra Hunt (United States)

16 September 2000
17:00

Australia	1–1	Sweden
Salisbury 57'	Report	Andersson 66' (pen.)

Sydney Football Stadium, Sydney
Attendance: 33,600
Referee: Sonia Denoncourt (Canada)

19 September 2000
17:30

Germany	1–0	Sweden
Hingst 88'	Report

Melbourne Cricket Ground, Melbourne
Attendance: 7,000
Referee: Wendy Toms (Great Britain)

== Handball ==
Summary

Key:

- ET: After extra time
- P – Match decided by penalty-shootout.

Team	Event	Group Stage						Quarterfinal	Semifinal	Final / BM / Pl.	
Team	Event	Opposition Score	Opposition Score	Opposition Score	Opposition Score	Opposition Score	Rank	Opposition Score	Opposition Score	Opposition Score	Rank
Sweden men's	Men's tournament	Australia; W 44–23	Slovenia; W 32–30	Tunisia; W 27–18	France; W 24–23	Spain; W 28–27	1 Q	Egypt; W 27–23	Spain; W 32–25	Russia; L 26–28	2nd place, silver medalist(s)

== Judo ==
Athlete	Event	Round of 32	Round of 16	Quarterfinals	Semifinals	Repechage 1	Repechage 2	Repechage 3	Final / BM	
Athlete	Event	Opposition Result	Opposition Result	Opposition Result	Opposition Result	Opposition Result	Opposition Result	Opposition Result	Opposition Result	Rank
Gabriel Bengtsson	Men's 66kg	Guimarães (BRA); L 0011–1000	Did not advance							
Pernilla Andersson	Women's 57kg	Bye	Gal (NED); W	Pekli (AUS); L	—N/a		Hüseynova (AZE); L	Did not advance		

== Modern pentathlon ==
Athlete	Event	Shooting (10 m air pistol)			Fencing (épée one touch)			Swimming (200 m freestyle)			Riding (show jumping)			Running (3000 m)			Total points	Final rank
Athlete	Event	Points	Rank	MP Points	Results	Rank	MP points	Time	Rank	MP points	Penalties	Rank	MP points	Time	Rank	MP Points	Total points	Final rank
Michael Brandt	Men's	180	8	1048	16	1	1000	2:13.71	20	1163	172	16	928	9:32.15	9	1112	5353	12
Jeanette Malm	Women's	170	17	976	8	23	680	2:19.70	4	1205	216	16	884	11:34.26	15	944	4687	17

== Rowing ==
Men

Athlete	Event	Heats		Repechage		Semifinals		Final	
Athlete	Event	Time	Rank	Time	Rank	Time	Rank	Time	Rank
Anders Båtemyr; Josef Källström	Lightweight double sculls	6:42.67	5 R	6:38.77	3 FC	—N/a		6:34.11	15

Women

Athlete	Event	Heats		Repechage		Semifinals		Final	
Athlete	Event	Time	Rank	Time	Rank	Time	Rank	Time	Rank
Maria Brandin	Single sculls	7:53.46	3 R	7:55.47	2 SA/B	7:49.09	5 FB	7:39.44	10

== Sailing ==
Sweden won one bronze medal and competed in nine Sailing events at the 2000 Sydney Olympics.

Men's Mistral

- Fredrik Palm

- Race 1 — (30)
- Race 2 — 21
- Race 3 — (30)
- Race 4 — 2
- Race 5 — 12
- Race 6 — 14
- Race 7 — 26
- Race 8 — 22
- Race 9 — 25
- Race 10 — 28
- Race 11 — 15
- Final — 165 (23rd place)

Men's Single Handed Dinghy (Finn)

- Fredrik Lööf

- Race 1 — (17)
- Race 2 — 5
- Race 3 — 1
- Race 4 — 6
- Race 5 — 7
- Race 6 — 4
- Race 7 — 4
- Race 8 — (22)
- Race 9 — 2
- Race 10 — 11
- Race 11 — 7
- Final — 47 (Bronze medal)

Men's Double Handed Dinghy (470)

- Johan Molund and Mattias Rahm

- Race 2 — 10
- Race 3 — 7
- Race 4 — (30) OCS
- Race 5 — 2
- Race 6 — (29)
- Race 7 — 1
- Race 8 — 4
- Race 9 — 19
- Race 10 — 20
- Race 11 — 15
- Final — 96 (12th place)

Women's Single Handed Dinghy (Europe)

- Therese Torgersson

- Race 1 — 16
- Race 2 — 14
- Race 3 — (23)
- Race 4 — 20
- Race 5 — 18
- Race 6 — 22
- Race 7 — 20
- Race 8 — 21
- Race 9 — 17
- Race 10 — 11
- Race 11 — (23)
- Final — 159 (22nd place)

Women's Double Handed Dinghy (470)

- Lena Carlsson and Agneta Engström

- Race 1 — (18)
- Race 2 — 13
- Race 3 — 2
- Race 4 — 10
- Race 5 — 6
- Race 6 — 9
- Race 7 — 14
- Race 8 — 4
- Race 9 — 2
- Race 10 — 11
- Race 11 — (19)
- Final — 71 (9th place)

Open Laser

- Karl Suneson

- Race 1 — 10
- Race 2 — 5
- Race 3 — 3
- Race 4 — 24
- Race 5 — 19
- Race 6 — 17
- Race 7 — 8
- Race 8 — 14
- Race 9 — (44) OCS
- Race 10 — (44) OCS
- Race 11 — 7
- Final — 107 (14th place)

Open Two Handed Keelboat (Star)

- Mats Johansson and Leif Möller

- Race 1 — (12)
- Race 2 — (16)
- Race 3 — 9
- Race 4 — 12
- Race 5 — 9
- Race 6 — 11
- Race 7 — 9
- Race 8 — 8
- Race 9 — 10
- Race 10 — 7
- Race 11 — 10
- Final — 85 (13th place)

Open Three Handed Keelboat (Soling)

- Magnus Augustson, Johan Barne and Hans Wallén

- Round robin Group 2 — (3-2) 3 points — Did not advance

Open High Performance Two Handed Dinghy (49er)

- John Harrysson and Patrik Sandeström

- Race 1 — 9
- Race 2 — 16
- Race 3 — 13
- Race 4 — (18) DSQ
- Race 5 — 15
- Race 6 — 15
- Race 7 — 15
- Race 8 — 14
- Race 9 — 12
- Race 10 — 15
- Race 11 — 15
- Race 12 — 16
- Race 13 — (18) OCS
- Race 14 — 14
- Race 15 — 15
- Race 16 — 18 DNF
- Final — 202 (17th place)

== Shooting ==
=== Men ===
Athlete	Event	Qualification		Final	
Athlete	Event	Points	Rank	Total	Rank
Jonas Edman	50m rifle prone	599	1 Q	701.3	1st place, gold medalist(s)
Jonas Edman	50m rifle three positions	1159	20	Did not advance	
Roger Hansson	10m air rifle	587	27	Did not advance	
Roger Hansson	50m rifle prone	594	13	Did not advance	
Roger Hansson	50m rifle three positions	1162	12	Did not advance	
Tomas Johansson	Skeet	115	43	Did not advance	
Conny Persson	Trap	113	13	Did not advance	
Conny Persson	Double trap	141	3 Q	184	4

=== Women ===
Athlete	Event	Qualification		Final	
Athlete	Event	Points	Rank	Total	Rank
Pia Hansen	Trap	64	8	Did not advance	
Pia Hansen	Double trap	112 OR	1 Q	148 OR	1st place, gold medalist(s)
Monica Rundqvist	10m air pistol	381	11	Did not advance	
Monica Rundqvist	25m pistol	567	33	Did not advance	

== Swimming ==
Men

Athlete	Event	Heat		Semifinal		Final	
Athlete	Event	Time	Rank	Time	Rank	Time	Rank
Lars Frölander	50m freestyle	DNS		Did not advance			
Stefan Nystrand	50m freestyle	22.53	10 Q	22.49	13	Did not advance	
Lars Frölander	100m freestyle	49.16	3 Q	48.93	4 Q	49.22	6
Stefan Nystrand	100m freestyle	50.19	19	Did not advance			
Mattias Ohlin	100m backstroke	57.51	36	Did not advance			
Patrik Isaksson	100m breaststroke	1:03.05	26	Did not advance			
Martin Gustavsson	200m breaststroke	2:15.02	8 Q	2:15.23	15	Did not advance	
Daniel Carlsson	100m butterfly	54.15	23	Did not advance			
Lars Frölander	100m butterfly	53.14	5 Q	52.84	4 Q	52.00 EU	1st place, gold medalist(s)
Lars Frölander; Stefan Nystrand; Johan Nyström; Mattias Ohlin; Johan Wallberg	4 × 100 m freestyle relay	3:19.80	7 Q	—N/a		3:19.60	6
Daniel Carlsson; Martin Gustavsson; Stefan Nystrand; Mattias Ohlin	4 × 100 m medley relay	3:40.88	10	Did not advance			

Women

Athlete	Event	Heat		Semifinal		Final	
Athlete	Event	Time	Rank	Time	Rank	Time	Rank
Therese Alshammar	50m freestyle	25.24	4 Q	24.80	2 Q	24.51	2nd place, silver medalist(s)
Anna-Karin Kammerling	50m freestyle	25.79	13 Q	25.61	9	Did not advance	
Therese Alshammar	100m freestyle	55.49	6 Q	55.31	7 Q	54.33 NR	2nd place, silver medalist(s)
Louise Jöhncke	100m freestyle	55.91	11 Q	55.94	13	Did not advance	
Camilla Johansson	100m backstroke	1:04.99	31	Did not advance			
Emma Igelström	100m breaststroke	1:11.09	22	Did not advance			
Anna-Karin Kammerling	100m butterfly	59.88	15 Q	1:00.40	16	Did not advance	
Johanna Sjöberg	100m butterfly	59.59	11 Q	59.15	10	Did not advance	
Therese Alshammar; Louise Jöhncke; Anna-Karin Kammerling; Josefin Lillhage; Malin Svahnström	4 × 100 m freestyle relay	3:43.77	6 Q	—N/a		3:40.30	3rd place, bronze medalist(s)
Emma Igelström; Louise Jöhncke; Camilla Johansson; Johanna Sjöberg	4 × 100 m medley relay	4:10.38	10	Did not advance			

== Table tennis ==
Athlete	Event	Group Stage		Round of 32	Round of 16	Quarterfinals	Semifinals	Final	
Athlete	Event	Opposition Result	Opposition Result	Opposition Result	Opposition Result	Opposition Result	Opposition Result	Opposition Result	Rank
Peter Karlsson	Men's singles	BYE		Roßkopf (GER); L 2–3	Did not advance				
Jörgen Persson	Men's singles	BYE		Franz (GER); W3–1	Matsushita (JPN); W 3–0	Gz Liu (CHN); W 3–1	Kong (CHN); L 1–3	Gl Liu (CHN); L 1–3	4
Jan-Ove Waldner	Men's singles	BYE		Iseki (JPN); W 3–1	Saive (BEL); W 3–1	Samsonov (BLR); W 3–2	Gl Liu (CHN); W 3–0	Kong (CHN); L 2–3	2nd place, silver medalist(s)
Fredrik Håkansson; Peter Karlsson	Men's doubles	Samsonov / Chtchetinine (BLR); W 2–0	Sweeris / Zhuang (USA); W 4–1	—N/a	Chila / Gatien (FRA); L 1–3	Did not advance			
Jörgen Persson; Jan-Ove Waldner	Men's doubles	BYE		—N/a	Eloi / Legout (FRA); L 0–3	Did not advance			
Marie Svensson	Women's singles	Kostromina (BLR); W 3–2	Al-Najar (JOR); W 3–0	Chen (TPE); L 0–3	Did not advance				
Åsa Svensson	Women's singles	Pavlovich (BLR); W 3–1	El-Alfy (EGY); W 3–0	Tian-Zörner (GER); W 3–2	Steff (ROU); L 2–3	Did not advance			
Marie Svensson; Åsa Svensson	Women's doubles	Abdul-Aziz / Osman (EGY); W 2–0	Kostromina / Pavlovich (BLR); L 1–2	—N/a	Did not advance				

== Taekwondo ==
Men

Athlete	Event	Round of 16	Quarterfinals	Semifinals	Repechage 1	Repechage 2	Final / BM	
Athlete	Event	Opposition Result	Opposition Result	Opposition Result	Opposition Result	Opposition Result	Opposition Result	Rank
Roman Livaja	-80kg	Geisler (PHI); W 4+-4	More (SLO); W 4-2	Matos (CUB); L 0-4	—N/a	Hansen (AUS); W 1-0	Estrada (MEX); L 1-2	4
Marcus Thorén	+80kg	Trenton (AUS); L 3-6	—N/a		Daley (GBR); L 2-9	Did not advance		

== Tennis ==
Athlete	Event	Round of 64	Round of 32	Round of 16	Quarterfinals	Semifinals	Final	
Athlete	Event	Opposition Score	Opposition Score	Opposition Score	Opposition Score	Opposition Score	Opposition Score	Rank
Thomas Johansson	Men's singles	Philippoussis (AUS); L 6–7^{(6–8)}, 4–6	Did not advance					
Magnus Norman	Men's singles	Pavel (ROU); W 6–7^{(1–7)}, 6–3, 10–8	Srichaphan (THA); W 7–5, 6–2	Di Pasquale (FRA); L 6–7^{(4–7)}, 6–7^{(2–7)}	Did not advance			
Mikael Tillström	Men's singles	Paes (THA); W 6–2, 3–4	Lareau (CAN); W 6–1, 3–6, 6–3	Federer (SUI); L 1–6, 2–6	Did not advance			
Andreas Vinciguerra	Men's singles	Ruud (NOR); W 6–2, 6–4	Haas (GER); L 6–4, 4–6, 2–6	Did not advance				
Nicklas Kulti; Mikael Tillström	Men's doubles	—N/a	Mirnyi / Voltchkov (BLR); L 3–6, 4–4 (r)	Did not advance				

== Triathlon ==
Athlete	Event	Swim (1.5 km)	Bike (40 km)	Run (10 km)	Total Time	Rank
Joachim Willen	Men's	17:48.89	59:43.20	34:08.71	1:51:40.80	35

== Wrestling ==
Greco-Roman

Athlete	Event	Elimination Pool				Quarterfinal	Semifinal	Final / BM	
Athlete	Event	Opposition Result	Opposition Result	Opposition Result	Rank	Opposition Result	Opposition Result	Opposition Result	Rank
Mattias Schoberg	69kg	Son (KOR); L 0-4	Juretzko (GER); L 0-2	—N/a	3	Did not advance			
Ara Abrahamian	76kg	Avramis (GRE); W 3-2	Geghamyan (ARM); W 3-0	—N/a	1 Q	Kardanov (RUS); L 1-3	—N/a	5th place match Kim (KOR); L 0-9	6
Martin Lidberg	85kg	Bárdosi (HUN); L 0-2	Bartolozzi (VEN); W 3-2	Olczak (AUS); W 4-0	2	Did not advance			
Mikael Ljungberg	97kg	Sudureac (ROU); W 3-2	Mollov (BUL); W 10-0	—N/a	1 Q	Matviyenko (KAZ); W 5-0	Lowney (USA); W 8-1	Saldadze (UKR); W 2-1	1st place, gold medalist(s)
Eddy Bengtsson	130kg	Debelka (BLR); L 1-2	Giorgadze (GEO); W 4-0	—N/a	2	Did not advance			

== See also ==
- Sweden at the 2000 Summer Paralympics

== Notes ==
- Wallechinsky, David (2004). The Complete Book of the Summer Olympics (Athens 2004 Edition). Toronto, Canada. ISBN 1-894963-32-6.
- International Olympic Committee (2001). The Results. Retrieved 12 November 2005.
- Sydney Organising Committee for the Olympic Games (2001). Official Report of the XXVII Olympiad Volume 1: Preparing for the Games. Retrieved 20 November 2005.
- Sydney Organising Committee for the Olympic Games (2001). Official Report of the XXVII Olympiad Volume 2: Celebrating the Games. Retrieved 20 November 2005.
- Sydney Organising Committee for the Olympic Games (2001). The Results. Retrieved 20 November 2005.
- International Olympic Committee Web Site
