= Bulgaria at the 2000 Summer Olympics =

- IOC code: BUL
- NOC: Bulgarian Olympic Committee
- Website: www.bgolympic.org (in Bulgarian and English)

in Sydney
- Competitors: 91 in 16 sports
- Flag bearer: Ivo Yanakiev
- Medals Ranked 16th: Gold 5 Silver 6 Bronze 2 Total 13

Summer Olympics appearances (overview)
- 1896; 1900–1920; 1924; 1928; 1932; 1936; 1948; 1952; 1956; 1960; 1964; 1968; 1972; 1976; 1980; 1984; 1988; 1992; 1996; 2000; 2004; 2008; 2012; 2016; 2020; 2024

Bulgaria competed at the 2000 Summer Olympics in Sydney, Australia.

== Medalists ==
Medal	Name	Sport	Event	Date
Gold	Tanyu Kiryakov	Shooting	Men's 50 metre pistol	19 September
Gold	Galabin Boevski	Weightlifting	Men's 69 kg	20 September
Gold	Mariya Grozdeva	Shooting	Women's 25 metre pistol	22 September
Gold	Tereza Marinova	Athletics	Women's triple jump	24 September
Gold	Armen Nazaryan	Wrestling	Men's Greco-Roman 58 kg	27 September
Silver	Georgi Markov	Weightlifting	Men's 69 kg	20 September
Silver	Rumyana Neykova	Rowing	Women's single sculls	23 September
Silver	Alan Tsagaev	Weightlifting	Men's 105 kg	25 September
Silver	Petar Merkov	Canoeing	Men's K-1 1000 metres	30 September
Silver	Serafim Barzakov	Wrestling	Men's freestyle 63 kg	30 September
Silver	Petar Merkov	Canoeing	Men's K-1 500 metres	1 October
Bronze	Yordan Yovchev	Gymnastics	Men's rings	24 September
Bronze	Yordan Yovchev	Gymnastics	Men's floor	24 September

== Athletics ==
Men
Track & road events

Athlete	Event	Heat		Quarterfinal		Semifinal		Final	
Athlete	Event	Result	Rank	Result	Rank	Result	Rank	Result	Rank
Iliya Dzhivondov	400 m	48.64	8	—		did not advance			
Iliya Dzhivondov	400 m hurdles	54.36	8	—		did not advance			
Petko Stefanov	Marathon	—						2:26:24	60
Zhivko Videnov	110 m hurdles	DNF		did not advance					
Petko Yankov	100 m	10.63	7	did not advance					
Petko Yankov	200 m	20.91	4 q	20.75	6	did not advance			

Field events

Athlete	Event	Qualification		Final	
Athlete	Event	Distance	Position	Distance	Position
Nikolay Atanasov	Long jump	7.62	30	did not advance	
Petar Dachev	Long jump	8.03	8 q	7.80	11
Rostislav Dimitrov	Triple jump	17.00	8 Q	16.95	9
Ilian Efremov	Pole vault	5.55	22	did not advance	
Ivaylo Rusenov	Triple jump	16.40	22	did not advance	

Women
Track & road events

Athlete	Event	Heat		Quarterfinal		Semifinal		Final	
Athlete	Event	Result	Rank	Result	Rank	Result	Rank	Result	Rank
Svetla Dimitrova	100 m hurdles	13.00	4 Q	13.04	6 q	12.95	6	did not advance	
Monika Gachevska	200 m	24.16	8	did not advance					
Daniela Georgieva	400 m	54.46	6	—		did not advance			
Petya Pendareva	100 m	11.30	2 Q	11.36	5	did not advance			
Daniela Yordanova	5000 m	15:10.08	5 q NR	—				14:56.95	10

Field events

Athlete	Event	Qualification		Final	
Athlete	Event	Distance	Position	Distance	Position
Mariya Dimitrova	Triple jump	13.87	16	did not advance	
Khristina Georgieva	Javelin throw	54.60	28	did not advance	
Hristina Kalcheva	High jump	NM		did not advance	
Tanya Koleva	Pole vault	NM		did not advance	
Tereza Marinova	Triple jump	14.73	3 Q	15.20	Gold medal
Eleonora Miloucheva	High jump	1.94	1 Q	1.90	13
Venelina Veneva	High jump	1.94	9 Q	1.93	9
Aneliya Yordanova	Hammer throw	54.92	26	did not advance	

== Badminton ==
Men's Singles

- Svetoslav Stoyanov
  - Round of 64 — Bye
  - Round of 32 — Defeated Rio Suryana of Australia
  - Round of 16 — Lost to Xia Xuanze of China
- Mihail Popov
  - Round of 64 — Bye
  - Round of 32 — Lost to Fung Permadi of Chinese Taipei

Men's Doubles

- Mihail Popov and Svetoslav Stoyanov
  - Round of 32 — Lost to Martin Lundgaard Hansen, Lars Paaske of Denmark

Women's Singles

- Nely Boteva
  - Round of 64 — Defeated Kellie Lucas of Australia
  - Round of 32 — Lost to Chia-Chi Huang of Chinese Taipei

Women's Doubles

- Nely Boteva and Diana Koleva
  - Round of 32 — Lost to Gao Ling, Qin Yiyuan of China

== Boxing ==
Athlete	Event	Round of 32	Round of 16	Quarterfinals	Semifinals	Final	
Athlete	Event	Opposition Result	Opposition Result	Opposition Result	Opposition Result	Opposition Result	Rank
Yuri Mladenov	Featherweight	Suleimanov (UKR); W 7–4	Aguilera (CUB); L 8–15	did not advance			
Dmitry Usagin	Light middleweight	Taylor (USA); L RSC	did not advance				
Emil Krastev	Light heavyweight	Ismayilov (AZE); L 9–14	did not advance				

== Canoeing ==
=== Sprint ===
Men

Athlete	Event	Heats		Semifinals		Final	
Athlete	Event	Time	Rank	Time	Rank	Time	Rank
Nikolav Bouhalov	C-1 500 m	01:51.996	4 Q	01:52.371	2 Q	02:44.289	9
Nikolav Bouhalov	C-1 1000 m	03:59.092	5 Q	04:05.236	8	did not advance	
Peter Merkov	K-1 500 m	01:40.227	1 Q	01:40.008	1 Q	01:58.393	Silver medal
Peter Merkov	K-1 1000 m	03:38.234	3 Q	03:38.217	1 Q	03:34.649	Silver medal
Petar Sibinkitch; Milko Kazanov	K-2 500 m	01:33.682	6 Q	01:31.919	2 Q	01:52.725	8
Mariyan Dimitrov; Dimitar Ivanov	K-2 1000 m	03:23.646	8	did not advance			
Milko Kazanov; Iordan Iordanov; Petar Merkov; Petar Sibinkitch	K-4 1000 m	03:00.634	4 Q	03:01.051	1 Q	02:58.112	5

== Equestrianism ==
=== Show jumping ===
Athlete	Horse	Event	Qualification								Final					Total	
Athlete	Horse	Event	Round 1		Round 2			Round 3			Round A		Round B			Total	
Athlete	Horse	Event	Penalties	Rank	Penalties	Total	Rank	Penalties	Total	Rank	Penalties	Rank	Penalties	Total	Rank	Penalties	Rank
Samantha McIntosh	Royal Discover	Individual	14.25	45	0.00	14.25	21 Q	4.00	18.25	17 Q	17.00	39	did not advance				
Guenter Orschel	Excellent	Individual	22.25	60	16.00	38.50	65 Q	12.50	50.75	58	did not advance						
Rossen Raitchev	Premier Cru	Individual	12.50	37	16.00	28.50	52 Q	8.00	36.50	46 Q	12.00	20 Q	8.00	20.00	20	20.00	20
Samantha McIntosh; Guenter Orschel; Rossen Raitchev	See above	Team	—		32.00	—	13	did not advance								32.00	13

== Modern Pentathlon ==
Athlete	Event	Shooting (10 m air pistol)			Fencing (épée one touch)			Swimming (200 m freestyle)			Riding (show jumping)			Running (3000 m)			Total points	Final rank
Athlete	Event	Points	Rank	MP Points	Time	Rank	MP points	Wins	Rank	MP points	Penalties	Rank	MP points	Time	Rank	MP Points	Total points	Final rank
Tzanko Hantov	Men's	169	23	964	9	19	720	2:07.66	8	1224	DNF	23	0	9:54.15	19	1024	3932	23

== Rowing ==
Men

Athlete	Event	Heats		Repechage		Semifinals		Final	
Athlete	Event	Time	Rank	Time	Rank	Time	Rank	Time	Rank
Ivo Yanakiev	Single sculls	7:03.24	2 R	7:09.22	2 SA/B/C	7:03.89	3 FA	6:57.32	5

Women

Athlete	Event	Heats		Repechage		Semifinals		Final	
Athlete	Event	Time	Rank	Time	Rank	Time	Rank	Time	Rank
Rumyana Neykova	Single sculls	7:36.10	1 SA/B/C	—		7:28.34	1 FA	7:28.15	2nd place, silver medalist(s)
Viktoriya Dimitrova; Margarita Petrova	Lightweight double sculls	7:22.51	5 R	7:18.90	3 SA/B/C	7:22.47	6 FB	7:17.64	12

== Sailing ==
Only one woman competed for Bulgaria in the Sailing competition at the 2000 Olympics.

Athlete	Event	Race											Net points	Final rank
Athlete	Event	1	2	3	4	5	6	7	8	9	10	11	Net points	Final rank
Irina Konstantinova	Mistral	20	~~25~~	22	15	25	22	22	23	~~26~~	22	22	193	24

== Shooting ==
Men

Athlete	Event	Qualification		Final	
Athlete	Event	Points	Rank	Points	Rank
Tanyu Kiryakov	Men's 10 m air pistol	581	8 Q	676.8	8
Tanyu Kiryakov	Men's 50 m pistol	570	1 Q	660.0	1st place, gold medalist(s)
Emil Milev	Men's 25 metre rapid fire pistol	586	4 Q	684.5	4

Women

Athlete	Event	Qualification		Final	
Athlete	Event	Points	Rank	Points	Rank
Mariya Grozdeva	Women's 10 m air pistol	367	38	did not advance	
Mariya Grozdeva	Women's 25 m pistol	589	2 Q	690.3	1st place, gold medalist(s)
Vesela Lecheva	10 m air rifle	391	20	did not advance	
Vesela Lecheva	50 m rifle 3 positions	578	11	did not advance	
Nonka Matova	10 m air rifle	388	36	did not advance	
Nonka Matova	50 m rifle 3 positions	577	14	did not advance	
Diana Yorgova	Women's 10 m air pistol	365	42	did not advance	
Diana Yorgova	Women's 25 m pistol	572	28	did not advance	

== Swimming ==
Men

Athlete	Event	Heat		Semifinal		Final	
Athlete	Event	Time	Rank	Time	Rank	Time	Rank
Ivan Angelov	100 metre backstroke	58.03	39	did not advance			
Ivan Angelov	200 metre backstroke	02:07.30	40	did not advance			
Simeon Makedonski	100 metre butterfly	55.49	38	did not advance			
Georgi Palazov	200 metre butterfly	02:04.40	40	did not advance			
Georgi Palazov	400 metre individual medley	04:35.92	40	did not advance			
Petar Stoychev	400 metre freestyle	03:59.94	34	did not advance			
Petar Stoychev	1500 metre freestyle	15:42.76	30	did not advance			
Krasimir Zahov	100 metre breaststroke	01:07.09	58	did not advance			

Women

Athlete	Event	Heat		Semifinal		Final	
Athlete	Event	Time	Rank	Time	Rank	Time	Rank
Ivanka Moralieva	200 metre freestyle	02:07.61	34	did not advance			
Ivanka Moralieva	400 metre freestyle	04:19.10	30	did not advance			
Ivanka Moralieva	800 metre freestyle	08:52.61	20	did not advance			

== Volleyball ==
=== Women's Beach Competition ===
Athlete	Event	Preliminary round	First Round	Second Round	Round of 16	Quarterfinals	Semifinals	Final / BM
Athlete	Event	Opposition Score	Opposition Score	Opposition Score	Opposition Score	Opposition Score	Opposition Score	Rank
Lina Yanchulova; Petia Yanchulova	Women's	Bade – Behar (BRA); L 0 – 1 (3–15)	Kadijk – Schoon-Kadijk (NED); W 1 – 0 (17–15)	Fernández – Larrea (CUB); L 0 – 1 (3–15)	did not advance			17

== Weightlifting ==
Men

Athlete	Event	Snatch		Clean & Jerk		Total	Rank
Athlete	Event	Result	Rank	Result	Rank	Total	Rank
Ivan Ivanov	−56 kg	~~130.0~~	~~2~~	~~162.5~~	~~=2~~	~~292.5~~	DSQ (Note: Ivan Ivanov originally won the silver medal but was disqualified after he tested positive for furosemide.)
Sevdalin Minchev	−62 kg	~~140.0~~	~~5~~	~~177.5~~	~~1~~	~~317.5~~	DSQ (Note: Sevdalin Minchev originally won the bronze medal but was disqualified after he tested positive for furosemide.)
Galabin Boevski	−69 kg	162.5	2	195.0 WR	1	357.5	1st place, gold medalist(s)
Georgi Markov	−69 kg	165.0	1	187.5	=2	352.5	2nd place, silver medalist(s)
Alan Tsagaev	−105 kg	187.5	=7	235.0 OR	=1	422.5	2nd place, silver medalist(s)

Women

Athlete	Event	Snatch		Clean & Jerk		Total	Rank
Athlete	Event	Result	Rank	Result	Rank	Total	Rank
Izabela Dragneva	−48 kg	~~85.0~~	~~1~~	~~105.0~~	~~1~~	~~190.0~~	DSQ (Note: Izabela Dragneva originally won the gold medal but was disqualified after she tested positive for furosemide.)
Donka Mincheva	−48 kg	AC	DNF	—	—	—	DNF
Daniela Kerkelova	−69 kg	100.0	=5	132.5 OR	=1	232.5	5
Milena Trendafilova	−69 kg	100.0	=5	132.5 OR	=1	232.5	4

== Wrestling ==
Men's Greco-Roman

Athlete	Event	Elimination				Quarterfinal	Semifinal	Final/BM	Rank
Athlete	Event	Opposition Score	Opposition Score	Opposition Score	Rank	Opposition Score	Opposition Score	Opposition Score	Rank
Armen Nazaryan	-58 kg	Sasamoto (JPN); W 11–0 ^{PP}	Cash (AUS); W 13–2 ^{SP}	Gukulov (TKM); W 4-1 ^{PP}	1 Q	Bye	Yıldız (GER); W 10–0 ^{ST}	Kim (KOR); W 10–3 ^{TO}	1st place, gold medalist(s)
Ali Mollov	-97 kg	Sudureac (ROU); L 1–6 ^{PP}	Ljungberg (SWE); L 0–10 ^{ST}	—	3	did not advance			19
Sergei Mureico	-130 kg	Karelin (RUS); L 0–3 ^{PO}	Deák-Bárdos (HUN); L 0–4 ^{PA}	—	3	did not advance			19

Men's Freestyle

Athlete	Event	Elimination				Quarterfinal	Semifinal	Final/BM	Rank
Athlete	Event	Opposition Score	Opposition Score	Opposition Score	Rank	Opposition Score	Opposition Score	Opposition Score	Rank
Ivan Tsonov	-54 kg	Chuchunov (RUS); L 0–4 ^{TO}	Zakharuk (UKR); L 0–10 ^{ST}	—	3	did not advance			19
Serafim Barzakov	-63 kg	Scheibe (GER); W 3–0 ^{PO}	Bodișteanu (MDA); W 4–1 ^{PP}	—	1 Q	Ortiz (CUB); W 4–1 ^{PP}	Talaei (IRI); W 4–0 ^{ST}	Umakhanov (RUS); L 2–3 ^{PP}	2nd place, silver medalist(s)
Petar Kasabov	-69 kg	Sánchez (CUB); L 0–4 ^{PO}	Dąbrowski (POL); W 3-2 ^{PP}	—	2	did not advance			15
Plamen Paskalev	-76 kg	Saitiev (RUS); L 2–8 ^{PP}	Slay (USA); L 1–4 ^{PP}	—	3	did not advance			16
Krasimir Kochev	-130 kg	Rodríguez (CUB); L 0–3 ^{PO}	Sumyaabazar (MGL); W 3–1 ^{PP}	—	2	did not advance			12
