= Nilforoushan =

Nilforoushan (Persian: نیلفروشان; also anglicized as Nilforoshan, Nilforooshan, and Nilforushan) is a Persian surname. Notable people with the surname include:

- Abbas Nilforoushan (1966–2024), Iranian brigadier general
- Ali Nilforoshan (born 1975), Iranian equestrian
