= Carl Edwards (disambiguation) =

Carl Edwards (born August 15, 1979) is an American former professional racing driver.

Carl Edwards may also refer to:

- Carl Johannes Edwards (1914–1985), British stained glass artist
- Carl Edwards (equestrian) (born 1963), British equestrian
- Carl Edwards Jr. (born 1991), American baseball player
