= Equestrian at the 2002 Asian Games – Individual jumping =

Individual jumping at the 2002 Asian Games
- Venue: Busan Equestrian Grounds
- Date: 11–14 October 2002
- Competitors: 37 from 10 nations

Medalists
gold medal	Mikee Cojuangco-Jaworski	Philippines
silver medal	Lee Jin-kyung	South Korea
bronze medal	Tadayoshi Hayashi	Japan

Individual jumping equestrian at the 2002 Asian Games was held in Busan Equestrian Grounds, Busan, South Korea from October 11 to October 14, 2002.

== Schedule ==
All times are Korea Standard Time (UTC+09:00)

Date	Time	Event
Friday, 11 October 2002	10:00	1st qualifier
Saturday, 12 October 2002	10:00	2nd qualifier
Monday, 14 October 2002	11:00	1st final
Monday, 14 October 2002	15:00	2nd final

== Results ==
Legend

- EL — Eliminated
- WD — Withdrawn

=== Qualifier ===
Rank	Athlete	Horse	1st qualifier			2nd qualifier			Total
Rank	Athlete	Horse	Jump	Time	Total	Jump	Time	Total	Total
1	Osamu Komiyama (JPN)	Everett	0	0	0	0	0	0	0
1	Kenji Morimoto (JPN)	Anderson	0	0	0	0	0	0	0
1	Tadayoshi Hayashi (JPN)	Caracas	0	0	0	0	0	0	0
1	Lee Jin-kyung (KOR)	Uncle Harry	0	0	0	0	0	0	0
1	Qabil Ambak (MAS)	Humpfry	0	0	0	0	0	0	0
6	Mikee Cojuangco-Jaworski (PHI)	Rustic Rouge	0	0	0	4	0	4	4
6	Quzier Ambak (MAS)	Calano	0	0	0	4	0	4	4
6	Kim Sung-whan (KOR)	Sinchul	0	0	0	4	0	4	4
6	Tara Ardalan (IRI)	Air Ride	0	0	0	4	0	4	4
6	Danielle Cojuangco (PHI)	Ascot T	0	0	0	4	0	4	4
6	Li Zhenqiang (CHN)	Fa Guan	4	0	4	0	0	0	4
6	Toni Leviste (PHI)	Nazli	4	0	4	0	0	0	4
13	Syed Omar Al-Mohdzar (MAS)	O Canthus	0	3	3	4	0	4	7
14	Michelle Barrera (PHI)	Coalminer	8	0	8	0	0	0	8
14	Ali Nilforoushan (IRI)	Herr Schroder	4	0	4	4	0	4	8
14	Yu Suk-jun (KOR)	Glenn	0	0	0	8	0	8	8
14	Chen Hui-ming (TPE)	Bea	4	0	4	4	0	4	8
18	Ramin Shakki (IRI)	Revanche	4	0	4	4	3	7	11
19	Chen Yi-tsung (TPE)	Calimero	8	0	8	4	0	4	12
19	Akkara Konglapamnuay (THA)	Heatwave	4	0	4	8	0	8	12
19	Syed Zain Al-Mohdzar (MAS)	Malibero	4	0	4	8	0	8	12
22	Meng Ke (CHN)	E Le	8	0	8	8	0	8	16
22	Huang Han-wen (TPE)	Game Boy	8	0	8	8	0	8	16
22	Arsia Ardalan (IRI)	Canterbuliry	0	0	0	16	0	16	16
22	Eiji Okazaki (JPN)	Warego Sandy	12	0	12	4	0	4	16
26	Jiensi Abudubieke (CHN)	Xi Xiawang	8	0	8	12	0	12	20
27	Jaspal Massih (IND)	Mast Mollah	16	0	16	8	0	8	24
27	Chiang Han-ju (TPE)	Big Boy	12	0	12	12	0	12	24
29	Dhewin Manathanya (THA)	Nairobi	12	0	12	8	6	14	26
30	Park Jae-hong (KOR)	Watch Spot	12	4	16	12	0	12	28
31	Sudhir Ahlawat (IND)	Taquade	8	13	21	8	10	18	39
32	Kiatnarong Klongkarn (THA)	Chana	16	0	16	24	0	24	40
33	Sandeep Dewan (IND)	Master	24	0	24	28	0	28	52
34	Sajjan Kumar (IND)	Titan	36	0	36	32	16	48	84
—	Liu Tongyan (CHN)	Buer Gede			EL				EL
—	Karittipoom Kreepkrang (THA)	Western Lightning			EL				EL
—	Tam Kong Shing (HKG)	Admiralty Fortune			EL				EL

=== Final ===
Rank	Athlete	Horse	1st final			2nd final			Total	Jump-off	
Rank	Athlete	Horse	Jump	Time	Total	Jump	Time	Total	Total	Pen.	Time
1st place, gold medalist(s)	Mikee Cojuangco-Jaworski (PHI)	Rustic Rouge	0	0	0	0	2	2	2	0	44.46
2nd place, silver medalist(s)	Lee Jin-kyung (KOR)	Uncle Harry	0	0	0	0	2	2	2	4	43.94
3rd place, bronze medalist(s)	Tadayoshi Hayashi (JPN)	Caracas	4	0	4	0	0	0	4	0	39.88
4	Osamu Komiyama (JPN)	Everett	0	0	0	4	0	4	4	4	39.03
5	Ali Nilforoushan (IRI)	Herr Schroder	4	0	4	0	1	1	5		
6	Li Zhenqiang (CHN)	Fa Guan	8	0	8	0	0	0	8		
6	Ramin Shakki (IRI)	Revanche	0	0	0	4	4	8	8		
8	Yu Suk-jun (KOR)	Glenn	8	0	8	0	2	2	10		
8	Danielle Cojuangco (PHI)	Ascot T	4	0	4	4	2	6	10		
10	Quzier Ambak (MAS)	Calano	4	0	4	4	6	10	14		
11	Kenji Morimoto (JPN)	Anderson	8	0	8	4	3	7	15		
12	Chen Hui-ming (TPE)	Bea	12	0	12	8	13	21	33		
13	Tara Ardalan (IRI)	Air Ride	16	0	16	8	10	18	34		
14	Meng Ke (CHN)	E Le	4	0	4	32	1	33	37		
15	Chen Yi-tsung (TPE)	Calimero	12	1	13	16	26	42	55		
16	Kim Sung-whan (KOR)	Sinchul	16	47	63	0	6	6	69		
—	Toni Leviste (PHI)	Nazli	4	9	13			WD	WD		
—	Huang Han-wen (TPE)	Game Boy	20	2	22			WD	WD		
—	Qabil Ambak (MAS)	Humpfry			EL				EL		
—	Akkara Konglapamnuay (THA)	Heatwave			EL				EL		
—	Syed Omar Al-Mohdzar (MAS)	O Canthus			EL				EL		
