= Nona Garson =

American equestrian

Personal information
- Nationality: American
- Born: September 30, 1958 (age 66); Westfield, New Jersey, United States

Sport
- Sport: Equestrian

Nona Garson (born September 30, 1958) is an American equestrian. She was born in Westfield, New Jersey. She competed in team jumping and individual jumping at the 2000 Summer Olympics in Sydney.
