= Gigi Hewitt =

United States Virgin Islands equestrian

Personal information
- Nationality: American Virgin Islander
- Born: July 6, 1972 (age 53); Saint Thomas, U.S. Virgin Islands

Sport
- Sport: Equestrian

Gigi Hewitt (born July 6, 1972) is an equestrian who represents the United States Virgin Islands. She competed in the individual jumping event at the 2000 Summer Olympics.
