= Peter Breakwell =

New Zealand equestrian

Personal information
- Nationality: New Zealand
- Discipline: Show jumping
- Born: 25 October 1957 (age 67); Waipukurau, New Zealand
- Horse(s): Leonson

Peter Breakwell (born 25 October 1957) is a New Zealand former equestrian. He competed in the individual jumping event at the 2000 Summer Olympics with Leonson.
