= Joaquín Larraín =

Chilean equestrian

Personal information
- Nationality: Chilean
- Born: 31 December 1953 (age 71)

Sport
- Sport: Equestrian

Joaquín Larraín (born 31 December 1953) is a Chilean equestrian. He competed in the individual jumping event at the 2000 Summer Olympics.
