= Gavin Chester =

Australian equestrian

Personal information
- Nationality: Australian
- Born: 31 December 1959 (age 65); Sale, Victoria, Australia

Sport
- Sport: Equestrian
- Event: Show jumping

Gavin Chester (born 31 December 1959) is an Australian equestrian. He competed in two events at the 2000 Summer Olympics in Sydney.

Chester was selected for the 1980 Summer Olympics in Moscow but was unable to compete due to the Australian Government's boycott.

Chester won the Australian Show Jumping Championship four times, twice riding Rossmore (Perth 1986, Adelaide 1987) and twice on Another Flood (Sydney 1999, Warrnambool 2001). He had bought Another Flood from Olympian Jennifer Parlevliet and Derek Beer. Parlevliet had competed on him at the 1996 Summer Olympics.

He has served as chair of the National Jumping Committee in Australia. He has continued his involvement in show jumping as a course designer and coach.
