= André Salah Sakakini =

Egyptian equestrian

Personal information
- Nationality: Egyptian
- Born: 23 May 1957 (age 67); Alexandria, Egypt

Sport
- Sport: Equestrian

André Salah Sakakini (born 23 May 1957) is an Egyptian equestrian. He competed at the 1988, 1992, 2000 and the 2004 Summer Olympics.
