= Ron Easey =

Australian equestrian (born 1960)

Personal information
- Nationality: Australian
- Born: 23 February 1960 (age 65); Quirindi, New South Wales, Australia

Sport
- Sport: Equestrian
- Event: Show jumping

Ron Easey (born 23 February 1960) is an Australian equestrian. He competed in two events at the 2000 Summer Olympics.

Easey was named the 2022 Ekka Legend in recognition of his contribution to Ekka as a show jumping rider since 1984, winning championships on many occasions.
