= Gianni Govoni =

Italian equestrian

Personal information
- Nationality: Italian
- Born: 6 April 1967 (age 57); Finale Emilia, Italy

Sport
- Sport: Equestrian

Gianni Govoni (born 6 April 1967) is an Italian equestrian. He competed at the 1992 Summer Olympics and the 2000 Summer Olympics.
