= Ryuma Hirota =

Japanese equestrian

Personal information
- Nationality: Japanese
- Born: 13 August 1976 (age 50)

Sport
- Sport: Equestrian

Ryuma Hirota (born 13 August 1976) is a Japanese equestrian. He competed in two events at the 2000 Summer Olympics.
