= John Pearce (equestrian) =

Canadian equestrian

Personal information
- Born: 3 May 1960 (age 64); Toronto, Ontario, Canada

Sport
- Sport: Equestrian

John Pearce (born 3 May 1960) is a Canadian equestrian. He competed in two events at the 2000 Summer Olympics.
