= Jonathan Asselin =

Canadian equestrian

Personal information
- Born: 4 December 1958 (age 66); Montreal, Quebec, Canada

Sport
- Sport: Equestrian

Jonathan Asselin (born 4 December 1958) is a Canadian equestrian. He competed in two events at the 2000 Summer Olympics.
