= Thierry Pomel =

French equestrian

Personal information
- Nationality: French
- Born: 4 October 1957 (age 67); Saumur, France

Sport
- Sport: Equestrian

Thierry Pomel (born 4 October 1957) is a French equestrian. He competed in two events at the 2000 Summer Olympics.
