= Antonio Maurer =

Mexican equestrian

Personal information
- Born: 25 February 1963 (age 62); Mexico City, Mexico

Sport
- Sport: Equestrian

Antonio Maurer (born 25 February 1963) is a Mexican equestrian. He competed in two events at the 2000 Summer Olympics.
