= Jamie Coman =

Australian equestrian (born 1962)

Personal information
- Nationality: Australian
- Born: 20 April 1962 (age 63) Bega, New South Wales, Australia

Sport
- Sport: Equestrian
- Event: Show jumping

Jamie Coman (born 20 April 1962) is an Australian former equestrian. He competed in two events at the 2000 Summer Olympics.
