= Fahad Al-Geaid =

Saudi Arabian equestrian

Personal information
- Nationality: Saudi Arabia
- Born: 24 November 1967 (age 57)
- Height: 1.70 m (5 ft 7 in)
- Weight: 70 kg (150 lb)

Sport
- Sport: Equestrianism

Fahad Al-Geaid (Arabic: فهد الجعيد; born 24 November 1967) is a Saudi Arabian equestrian. He competed in the 2000 Summer Olympics.
