= Simeon Makedonski =

Bulgarian swimmer

Personal information
- Full name: Симеон Македонски
- Nationality: Bulgarian
- Born: 4 April 1977 (age 49) Varna, Bulgaria

Sport
- Sport: Swimming

Simeon Makedonski (Bulgarian: Симеон Македонски) (born 4 April 1977 in Varna, Bulgaria) is a retired butterfly swimmer from Bulgaria, who competed for his native country at the 2000 Summer Olympics in Sydney, Australia. In the qualifying round of the men's 100m butterfly, he swam the 100m in 55.49 seconds, but did not qualify for the semifinal.

Makedonski currently lives in the United States, with his wife, Hristina, and his 2 children Emma Makedonska and Theodor Makedonski.

== See also ==
- Swimming at the 2000 Summer Olympics
