= Geoff Bloomfield =

Australian equestrian

Personal information
- Nationality: Australian
- Born: 5 February 1956 (age 69); Echuca, Victoria, Australia

Sport
- Sport: Equestrian
- Event: Show jumping

Geoff Bloomfield (born 5 February 1956) is an Australian equestrian. He competed in two events at the 2000 Summer Olympics.
