= Luis Astolfi =

Spanish equestrian

Personal information
- Nationality: Spanish
- Born: 18 April 1959 (age 67) Seville, Spain
- Height: 185 cm (6 ft 1 in)
- Weight: 73 kg (161 lb)

Sport
- Sport: Equestrian
Medal record
Representing Spain
Mediterranean Games
| Bronze medal – third place | 1993 Languedoc-Roussillon | Team jumping |

Luis Astolfi Pérez de Guzmán (born 18 April 1959) is a retired Spanish equestrian. He competed in individual and team jumping events at the 1984, 1988, 1992 and the 2000 Summer Olympics with the best individual result of tenth place in 1984.
