= Carl Edwards (equestrian) =

British equestrian (born 1963)

Personal information
- Nationality: British
- Born: 14 September 1963 (age 62)

Sport
- Sport: Equestrian

Carl Edwards (born 14 September 1963) is a British equestrian. He competed in two events at the 2000 Summer Olympics.
