= Takeshi Shirai =

Japanese equestrian

Personal information
- Nationality: Japanese
- Born: 15 April 1977; Hokkaido, Japan
- Died: 26 April 2024 (aged 47)

Sport
- Sport: Equestrian

Takeshi Shirai (15 April 1977 – 26 April 2024) was a Japanese equestrian. He competed at the 1996 Summer Olympics and the 2000 Summer Olympics.
