= Lesley McNaught-Mändli =

Swiss equestrian (1964–2023)

Medal record

Equestrian

Representing Switzerland

Olympic Games
Silver medal – second place	2000 Sydney	Team jumping

Lesley McNaught-Mändli (10 February 1964 – 26 December 2023) was a British-born Swiss equestrian.

== Biography ==
McNaught-Mändli grew up on the family farm in Hinckley, Leicestershire, and began training with Ted Edgar, a successful international show jumper. In 1981 she became a Junior European Champion with her horse One More Time IV, after winning at Aarau, Switzerland.

At the age of 18 she emigrated to Switzerland, where she got a job working for Willi Melliger at his stables near Neuendorf. It was whilst living in Switzerland that Lesley met and married Markus Mändli, brother of a Swiss show jumper Beat Mändli. Riding for Switzerland, Lesley won a silver medal in show jumping at the 2000 Summer Olympics in Sydney.

McNaught-Mändli died on 26 December 2023, at the age of 59.
