= Günter Orschel =

Bulgarian equestrian

Personal information
- Nationality: Bulgarian
- Born: 6 August 1956 (age 68); Singen, West Germany

Sport
- Sport: Equestrian

Günter Orschel (born 6 August 1956) is a Bulgarian equestrian. He competed in two events at the 2000 Summer Olympics.
