= Geoff Billington =

British showjumper

Personal information
- Full name: Geoff Billington
- Nationality: United Kingdom
- Discipline: Show jumping
Medal record
Equestrian
World Championships
Bronze medal – third place	1998 Rome	Jumping Team
European Championships
Bronze medal – third place	1997 Mannheim	Jumping Team

Geoff Billington is a British showjumper who has represented Great Britain on a number of occasions including during the European and World Championships and at the Olympics. As of Jan 2010, Geoff was ranked 13th on the Team GBR list.

== Early life ==
Geoff Billington was born on 2 March 1955, and started riding at the age of nine years at a local riding school. He went to serve an apprenticeship with showjumper David Bowen.

== Career achievements ==
Geoff Billington has competed once in 1998 at the World Championships, achieving a team bronze medal, and also has a European championship team bronze medal from 1997, although he also competed there in 1999 and 2009.

He has represented Great Britain at the Olympics in both Atlanta 1996 and Sydney 2000 and has competed in 46 Nations Cups since 1976, with a total of 9 wins.

Billington has also won the British Jumping Derby at Hickstead in 2007, on the grey horse Cassabachus, narrowly missing out on the same title a year later to William Funnell.
