= Albert Voorn =

Dutch equestrian

Medal record

Representing Netherlands

Olympic Games

Men's equestrian
Silver medal – second place	2000 Sydney	Individual jumping

Albert Bernard Voorn (born 23 May 1956, in Hilversum) is a Dutch equestrian and Olympic medalist.

His son is Vincent Voorn who also competed as an international show jumper.

== Olympic record ==
Voorn competed at the 2000 Summer Olympics held in Sydney, where he won a silver medal in Individual Jumping.

== National and International Championship results ==
Results
Year	Event	Horse	Placing
1982	World Championships	Jonker	4th
1982	Dutch Championships	Devon S	3rd place, bronze medalist(s)
1983	Dutch Championship	Purplex	5th
1984	World Championship	Nimmerdor	4th
1986	World Cup Trial	Rasputin	
1988	Dutch Championship	Winnipig	2nd place, silver medalist(s)
1994	World Cup Trial	Amethyst	
2000	Dutch Championship	Lando	1st place, gold medalist(s)
