= Fernando Sarasola =

Spanish equestrian

Personal information
- Nationality: Spanish
- Born: 22 May 1966 (age 58)

Sport
- Sport: Equestrian

Fernando Sarasola (born 22 May 1966) is a Spanish equestrian. He competed at the 1996 Summer Olympics and the 2000 Summer Olympics.
