= Luiz Felipe de Azevedo =

Brazilian equestrian (born 1953)

Medal record

Equestrian

Representing Brazil

Olympic Games
Bronze medal – third place	1996 Atlanta	Team jumping
Bronze medal – third place	2000 Sydney	Team jumping

Luiz Felipe de Azevedo (born 17 August 1953) is a Brazilian equestrian. He was born in Rio de Janeiro. He won a bronze medal in show jumping at the 1996 Summer Olympics in Atlanta with the Brazilian team, and again at the 2000 Summer Olympics in Sydney.
