= Tadayoshi Hayashi =

Japanese equestrian (born 1968)

Personal information
- Nationality: Japanese
- Born: 1 March 1968 (age 58) Katori, Chiba, Japan

Sport
- Sport: Equestrian
Medal record
Equestrian
Representing Japan
Asian Games
Gold medal – first place	2002 Busan	Team jumping
Bronze medal – third place	2002 Busan	Individual jumping

Tadayoshi Hayashi (林 忠義, Hayashi Tadayoshi; born 1 March 1968) is a Japanese equestrian. He competed at the 2000 Summer Olympics and the 2004 Summer Olympics.
