= Sydney International Equestrian Centre =

Sports center in Australia

Coordinates: 33°50′55″S 150°51′15″E

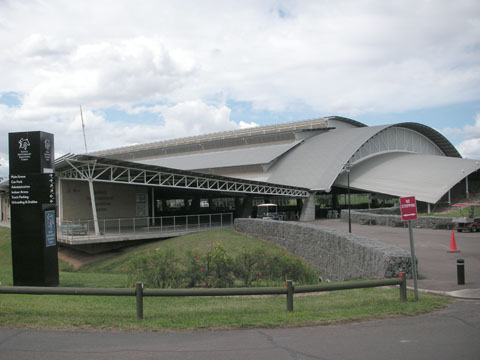
The Sydney International Equestrian Centre in Horsley Park, New South Wales.

The Sydney International Equestrian Centre (SIEC for short) is the facility which was used to host equestrian events during the 2000 Summer Olympics and 2000 Summer Paralympics. The centre is located 45 kilometres from Sydney's business district and the harbour at Saxony Road, Horsley Park. Construction began in 1997, was finished in 1999 and it successfully hosted Olympic and Paralympic equestrian events in 2000.

== Olympics & Paralympics ==
The events for the Olympics were held from 16 September to 1 October, while the Paralympic events were held between 18 and 29 October.

== Post Olympics Usage ==
As with other Sydney Olympic facilities, the centre has continued to be used, upgraded & maintained after the Games. The Centre continues to host equestrian and other sporting events and remains an international standard equestrian sports facility. There are 10 km of trails, steeple chase tracks and cross country courses, large indoor & outdoor arenas with spectator seating, accommodation, administration buildings, conference rooms and horse stabling.

== Current use ==
The Sydney International Equestrian Centre is still in use for various international horse shows such as the annual Sydney CDI, one of the biggest international dressage competitions in Australia. Besides the dressage show, it also hosts international show-jumping CSI events, eventing CCI events and competitions in Vaulting and Para-equestrian.
