= Wilhelm Melliger =

Swiss equestrian

- Melliger astride Calvaro V

Personal information
- Other names: Willi Melliger
- Discipline: Jumping
- Born: 26 July 1953; Buttwil, Switzerland
- Died: 16 January 2018 (aged 64)
- Horse: Calvaro V
Medal record
Equestrian
Representing Switzerland
Olympic Games
Silver medal – second place	1996 Atlanta	Individual jumping
Silver medal – second place	2000 Sydney	Team jumping

Wilhelm "Willi" Melliger (26 July 1953 – 16 January 2018) was a Swiss equestrian and Olympic medalist. With his horse Calvaro V, he won two Olympic silver medals: the first in show jumping at the 1996 Summer Olympics in Atlanta and the second as part of team jumping at the 2000 Summer Olympics in Sydney.

Melliger died on 16 January 2018 from complications of a stroke that he suffered in December 2017. He was 64.
