= Santiago Lambre =

Mexican equestrian

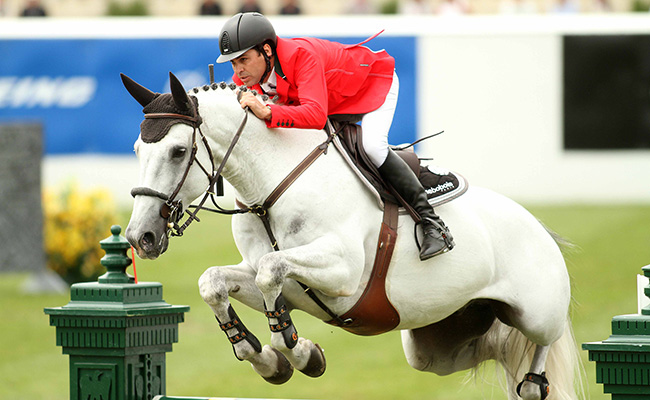
- Lambre in 2014

Personal information
- Full name: Santiago Lambre Della Croce
- Nationality: Mexican
- Discipline: Show jumping
- Born: 23 July 1975 (age 51); Porto Alegre, Brazil
- Height: 178 cm (5 ft 10 in)
- Weight: 68 kg (150 lb)
Medal record
Equestrian
Representing Mexico
Pan American Games
Silver medal – second place	2003 Santo Domingo	Team jumping

Santiago Lambre Della Croce (born 23 July 1975) is a Brazilian-born Mexican equestrian and trainer. He has won over 100 international competitions during his career and represented Mexico in various regional and international tournaments including three Panamerican Games and the 2000 Olympic Games.

== Biography ==
Lambre was born in Porto Alegre, Brazil on 23 July 1975. His father, Nestor Lambre was a professional show jumping rider with proven success and recognition in South America and Europe, who influenced Santiago’s love for the sport who started riding when he was 5 years old.

Soon after finishing his high school studies, Santiago decided to move to Europe searching for new challenges in his equestrian career, where he lived and worked in various countries, including Belgium, France, the Netherlands and Germany, achieving quick success as young rider.

He soon turned professional, competing in international competitions where he continued his growth as both rider and trainer.

In 2008, Lambre failed to qualify for the Mexican Olympic team. But later that year, he won the Enbridge Cup in Calgary. In September 2015, he came second in the Longines Grand Prix in Barcelona. In 2020, he won the NetJets Grand Prix CSI2 in Palm Beach, Florida. In 2024, he won the H H The Amir Sword showjumping title in Doha.

== Championships ==
Santiago has represented Mexico in various regional and international tournaments and has won over 100 international competitions during his career:

- 1999 Pan American Games in Winnipeg / Riding Raisa La Silla
- 2000 Summer Olympics in Sydney / Riding Dollar de la Pierre (a.k.a. Tlaloc)
- 2003 Pan American Games in Santo Domingo / Riding MarcosW
- 2004 Summer Olympics in Athens as reserve rider / Riding Imperio Rouge
- 2007 Pan American Games in Rio de Janeiro / Riding Curant
- 2014 World Equestrian Games in Normandy / Jhonny Boy
