= Jay Hayes =

Canadian equestrian

Personal information
- Nationality: Canadian
- Born: 14 June 1957 (age 67); Hartford, Connecticut, United States

Sport
- Sport: Equestrian

Jay Hayes (born 14 June 1957) is a Canadian equestrian. He competed at the 1992 Summer Olympics and the 2000 Summer Olympics.
