= Ali Nilforoshan =

Iranian equestrian

Personal information
- Nationality: Iranian
- Born: 1 September 1975 (age 49)

Sport
- Sport: Equestrian

Ali Nilforoshan (born 1 September 1975) is an Iranian equestrian jumper and trainer. He competed in the individual jumping event at the 2000 Summer Olympics.
