= Malin Baryard-Johnsson =

Swedish equestrian (born 1975)

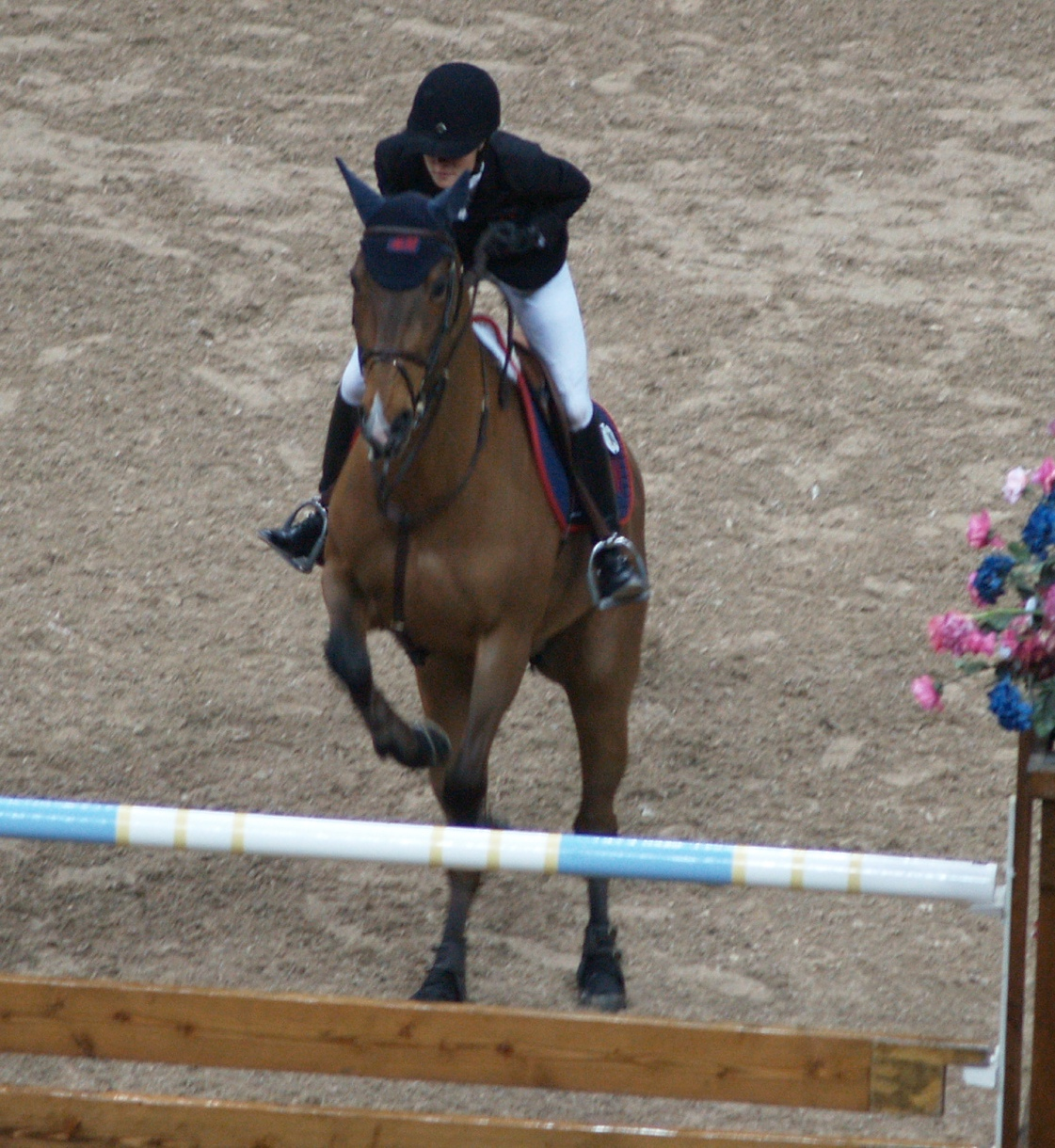
- Baryard-Johnsson on Butterfly Flip in 2007.

Personal information
- Born: Malin Birgitta Barijard; 10 April 1975 (age 51) Söderköping, Sweden
Medal record
Equestrian
Representing Sweden
Olympic Games
Gold medal – first place	2020 Tokyo	Team jumping
Silver medal – second place	2004 Athens	Team jumping
World Championships
Gold medal – first place	2022 Herning	Team jumping
Silver medal – second place	2002 Jerez	Team jumping
Silver medal – second place	2018 Tryon	Team jumping
European Championships
Silver medal – second place	2001 Arnhem	Team jumping
Silver medal – second place	2017 Gothenburg	Team jumping

Malin Birgitta Baryard-Johnsson (born 10 April 1975) is a Swedish equestrian, competing in show jumping. Baryard started to ride at the age of six and went on to be a very accomplished show jumper. She won a gold medal in the Swedish Championships at the age of just 14. She married Swedish TV presenter Henrik Johnsson in the summer of 2004, and made her TV-presenting debut in the autumn of 2004 on the SVT show Barbacka.

== Achievements ==
In the 1996 Summer Olympics, Baryard placed 49th in the individual competition, and the Swedish team placed 10th. At the 1998 World Equestrian Games, Baryard placed 66th individually and 12th team. At the 2000 Summer Games, she placed 20th individually and 7th in the team competition. At the 2002 World Equestrian Games, she placed 12th individually and the Swedish team placed 2nd overall. At the 2004 Summer Games, Baryard placed 28th, while the Swedish team gained a silver medal overall. At the 2006 World Equestrian Games, Baryard placed 107th individually and 12th team.

Malin Baryard / H&M Butterfly Flip were awarded the 2003 FEI Best Horse and Rider Combination, having placed in the top ten in 21 competitions that year. The duo amassed a total of 1224 points, to finish the rankings 221 points ahead of Ludger Beerbaum / Goldfever 2 and 222 points ahead of Markus Fuchs / Granie. That same year, Baryard placed third in the FEI World Cup Final with Butterfly Flip in Las Vegas. In addition, the duo placed 7th in 2002, 6th in 2004 and 10th in 2007. Baryard also placed 7th with Corrmint in the 1996 World Cup Final, for a total of five top ten finishes in the event.

In 2021, at the 2020 Summer Olympics, Baryard placed 5th in the Individual jumping events. She won the Olympic gold medal in the Team jumping event.

== Discography ==
- 2004 – Spånka feat. Malin Baryard – Do You Wanna Ride?
