= Maria Gretzer =

Swedish equestrian (born 1958)

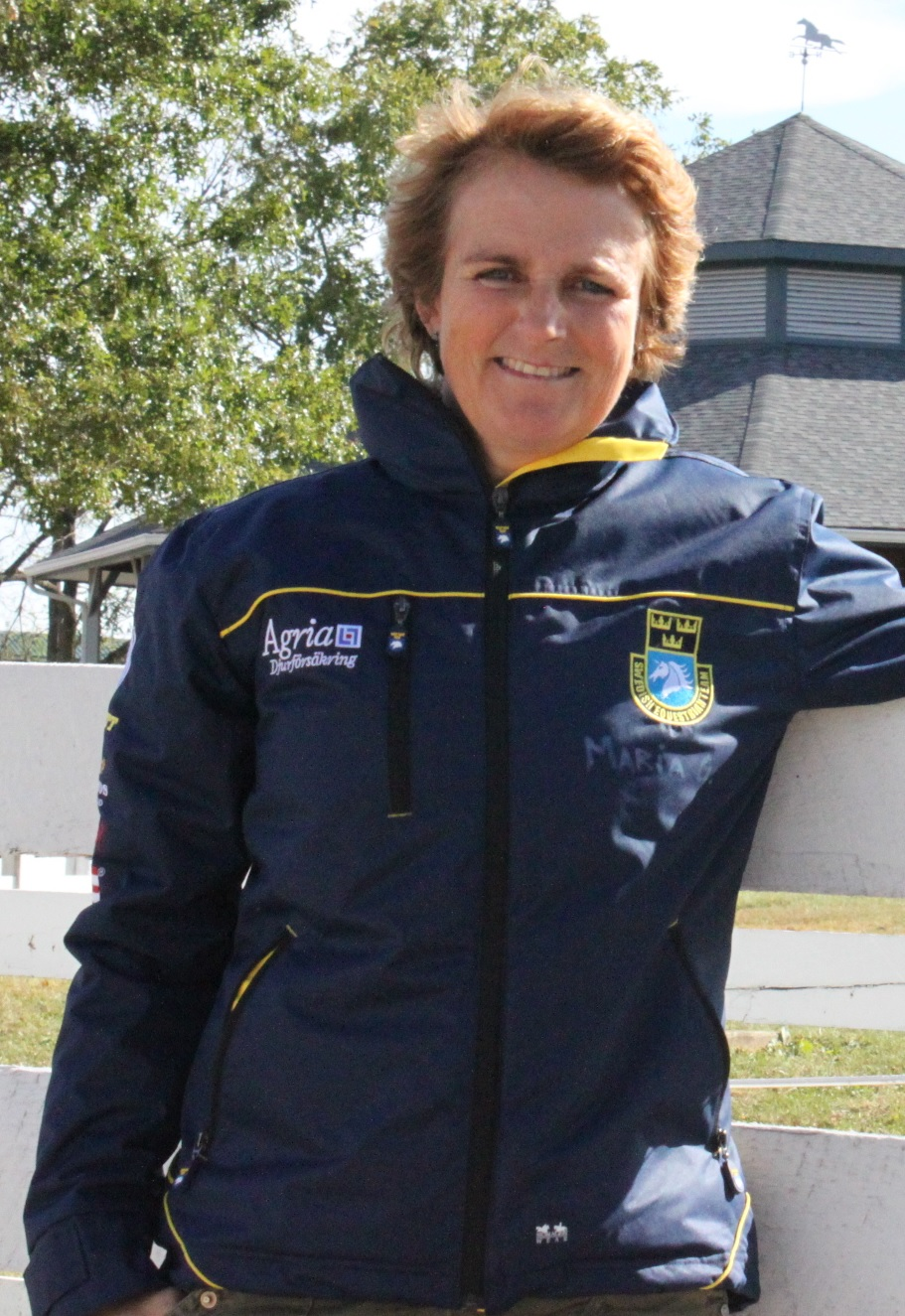
- Maria Gretzer in 2010

Personal information
- Nationality: Swedish
- Born: 11 November 1958 (age 67) Örebro, Sweden

Sport
- Sport: Equestrian

Maria Gretzer (born 11 November 1958) is a Swedish equestrian. She competed at the 1992 Summer Olympics, the 1996 Summer Olympics and the 2000 Summer Olympics.
