= Helena Lundbäck =

Swedish equestrian

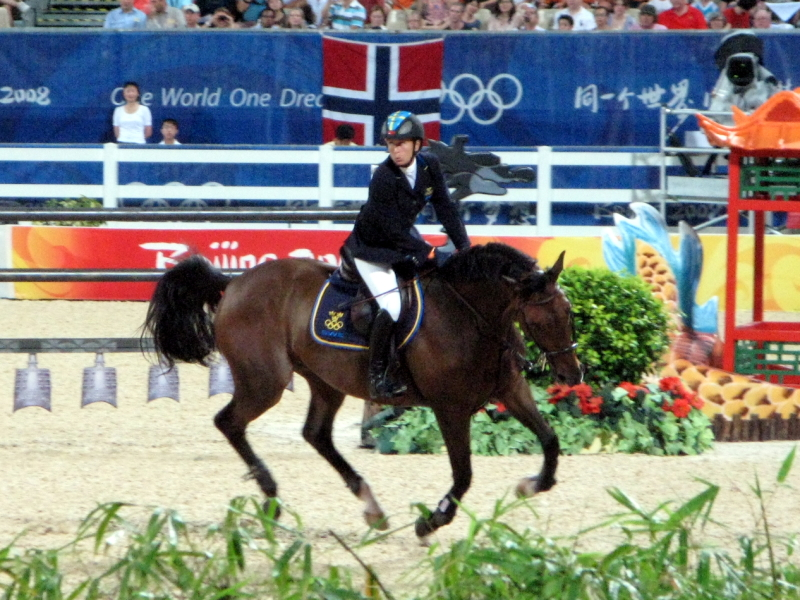
- Helena Lundbäck in 2008

Personal information
- Nationality: Swedish
- Born: 15 March 1976 (age 49); Norrköping, Sweden

Sport
- Sport: Equestrian

Helena Lundbäck (born 15 March 1976) is a Swedish equestrian. She competed at the 2000 Summer Olympics and the 2008 Summer Olympics.
