= Rosen Raychev =

Bulgarian equestrian

Personal information
- Nationality: Bulgarian
- Born: 9 March 1967 (age 58); Dimitrovgrad, Bulgaria

Sport
- Sport: Equestrian

Rosen Raychev (Bulgarian: Росен Райчев; born 9 March 1967) is a Bulgarian former equestrian. He competed at the 2000 Summer Olympics and the 2004 Summer Olympics.
