= Lisen Bratt =

Swedish equestrian

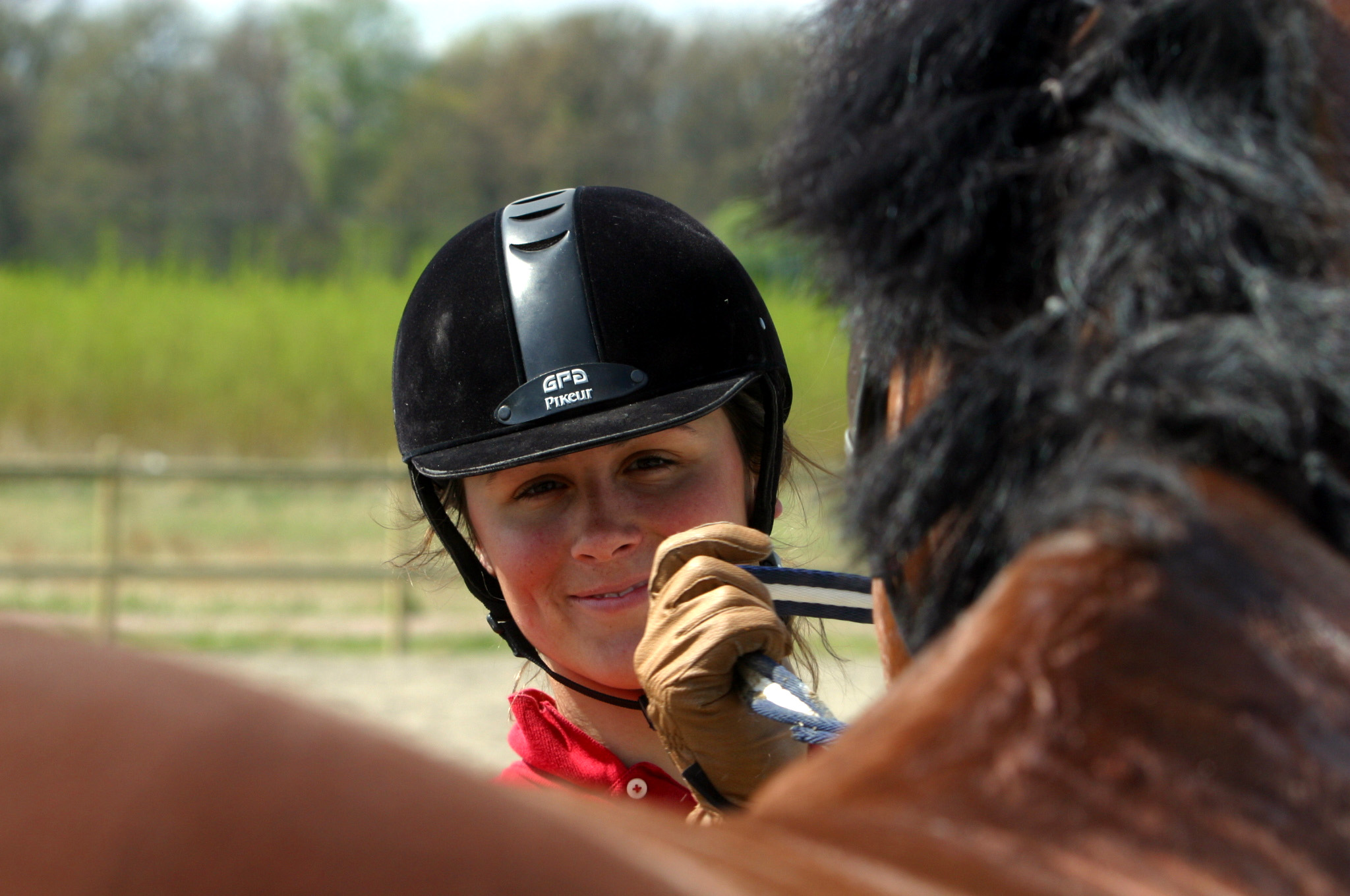

Personal information
- Nationality: Swedish
- Born: 23 January 1976 (age 49); Stockholm
- Spouse: Peder Fredricson

Sport
- Sport: Equestrian

Lisen Bratt (born 23 January 1976) is a Swedish equestrian, born in Stockholm.

== Biography ==
Bratt competed at the 2000 Summer Olympics in Sydney, and the 2012 Summer Olympics in London.

She was born in Stockholm on 23 January 1976. She is married to Peder Fredricson.
