= Equestrian events at the 2000 Summer Olympics =

Equestrian at the Games of the XXVII Olympiad
- Venue: Sydney International Equestrian Centre
- Dates: 16 September – 1 October 2000
- No. of events: 6
- Competitors: 195 from 37 nations

The equestrian events at the 2000 Summer Olympics in Sydney included dressage, eventing, and show jumping. All three disciplines had both individual and team competitions. This was the first time equestrian events were held in Australia, as the 1956 events were held in Stockholm, Sweden due to quarantine regulations in the country to restrict imported horses to Australia at the time.

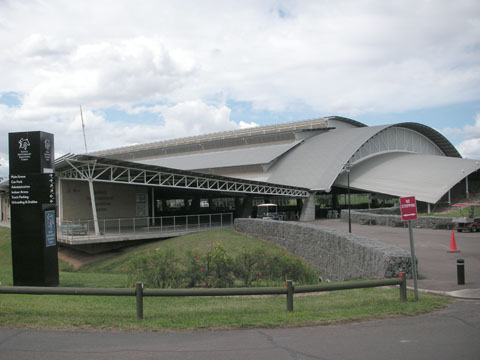
Horsely Park, one of the Olympic venues

== Event summary ==
Games	Gold	Silver	Bronze
Individual dressage	Anky van Grunsven and Bonfire; Netherlands	Isabell Werth and Gigolo FRH; Germany	Ulla Salzgeber and Rusty; Germany
Team dressage	Germany; Isabell Werth and Gigolo FRH; Nadine Capellmann and Farbenfroh; Ulla Salzgeber and Rusty; Alexandra Simons de Ridder and Chacomo	Netherlands; Ellen Bontje and Silvano; Anky van Grunsven and Bonfire; Arjen Teeuwissen and Goliath; Coby van Baalen and Ferro	United States; Susan Blinks and Flim Flam; Robert Dover and Ranier; Guenter Seidel and Foltaire; Christine Traurig and Etienne
Individual eventing	David O'Connor and Custom Made; United States	Andrew Hoy and Swizzle In; Australia	Mark Todd and Eyespy II; New Zealand
Team eventing	Australia; Phillip Dutton and House Doctor; Andrew Hoy and Darien Powers; Stuart Tinney and Jeepster; Matt Ryan and Kibah Sandstone	Great Britain; Ian Stark and Jaybee; Jeanette Brakewell and Over To You; Pippa Funnell and Supreme Rock; Leslie Law and Shear H2O	United States; Nina Fout and 3 Magic Beans; Karen O'Connor and Prince Panache; David O'Connor and Giltedge; Linden Wiesman and Anderoo
Individual jumping	Jeroen Dubbeldam and De Sjiem; Netherlands	Albert Voorn and Lando; Netherlands	Khaled Al-Eid and Khashm al-'Aan; Saudi Arabia
Team jumping	Germany; Ludger Beerbaum and Goldfever 3 Lars Nieberg and Esprit FRH; Marcus Ehning and For Pleasure; Otto Becker and Dobels Cento	Switzerland; Markus Fuchs and Tinka's Boy; Beat Maendli and Pozitano; Lesley McNaught and Dulf; Willi Melliger and Calvaro V	Brazil; Rodrigo Pessoa and Baloubet du Rouet; Luiz Felipe De Azevedo and Ralph; Álvaro Miranda Neto and Aspen; André Johannpeter and Calei

== Medals ==
Rank	Nation	Gold	Silver	Bronze	Total
1	Netherlands	2	2	0	4
2	Germany	2	1	1	4
3	Australia	1	1	0	2
4	United States	1	0	2	3
5	Great Britain	0	1	0	1
5	Switzerland	0	1	0	1
7	Brazil	0	0	1	1
7	New Zealand	0	0	1	1
7	Saudi Arabia	0	0	1	1
Totals (9 entries)		6	6	6	18

== Officials ==
Appointment of officials was as follows:

Dressage

- (Sweden) Eric Lette (Ground Jury President)
- (Australia) Mary Seefried (Ground Jury Member)
- (Netherlands) Jan Peeters (Ground Jury Member)
- (United States) Axel Steiner (Ground Jury Member)
- (Germany) Volker Moritz (Ground Jury Member)

Jumping

- (Netherlands) Jan-Willem Körner (Ground Jury President)
- (Australia) Graham Davey (Ground Jury Member)
- (Slovakia) Peter Herchel (Ground Jury Member)
- (Greece) Leonidas Georgopoulos (Ground Jury Member)
- (New Zealand) Jennifer Millar (Technical Delegate)

Eventing

- (Denmark) Frederik Obel (Ground Jury President)
- (United Kingdom) Jean Scott Mitchell (Ground Jury Member)
- (Australia) Brian Schrapel (Ground Jury Member)
- (United States) Brian Ross (Ground Jury Member)
- (New Zealand) Jennifer Millar (Technical Delegate)
