= Equestrian at the 1996 Summer Olympics – Individual jumping =

Individual jumping at the Games of the XXVI Olympiad
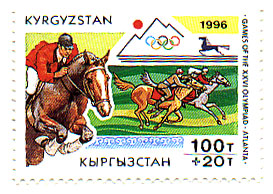
- Kyrgyzstan stamp commemorating 1996 Olympic equestrianism
- Venue: Georgia International Horse Park
- Dates: 29 July – 4 August
- Competitors: 82 from 24 nations
- Winning total: 1.00 faults

Medalists
1st place, gold medalist(s)		Ulrich Kirchhoff; Germany
2nd place, silver medalist(s)		Wilhelm Melliger; Switzerland
3rd place, bronze medalist(s)		Alexandra Ledermann; France

The individual show jumping event, part of the equestrian program at the 1996 Summer Olympics, was held from 29 July to 1 August 1996 at the Georgia International Horse Park, in Conyers, Georgia. Like all other equestrian events, the jumping competition was mixed gender, with both male and female athletes competing in the same division. There were 82 competitors from 24 nations. Each nation could have up to 4 riders. The event was won by Ulrich Kirchhoff of Germany, the nation's second consecutive victory in the individual jumping (and third overall, tying Italy for second-most all-time after France's four). It was the fourth consecutive Games at which Germany competed that the nation reached the podium in the event—gold in 1936 and bronze in 1952 (with no Games in 1940 or 1944, Germany disinvited in 1948, and either United Team of Germany or separate West Germany and East Germany teams competing from 1956 to 1988), before gold again in 1992 and 1996. The silver medal went to Wilhelm Melliger of Switzerland and the bronze to Alexandra Ledermann of France, the two of whom came out on top of a seven-way jump-off for second place.

== Background ==
This was the 20th appearance of the event, which had first been held at the 1900 Summer Olympics and has been held at every Summer Olympics at which equestrian sports have been featured (that is, excluding 1896, 1904, and 1908). It is the oldest event on the current programme, the only one that was held in 1900.

Seven of the top 10 riders from the 1992 Games returned: gold medalist Ludger Beerbaum of Germany, fourth-place finisher Hervé Godignon of France, fifth-place finisher (and 1988 seventh-place finisher) Jan Tops of the Netherlands, sixth-place finisher Maria Gretzer of Sweden, seventh-place finisher Ludo Philippaerts of Belgium, ninth-place finisher Rodrigo Pessoa of Brazil, and tenth-place finisher Michael Matz of the United States. The reigning World Champion was Franke Sloothaak of Germany.

Saudi Arabia made its debut in the event. France competed for the 18th time, most of any nation.

== Competition format ==
The competition underwent a smaller format change than in the two previous Games. The three-run qualifying and two-run final continued, though the number of finalists was reduced to 25 (from half the field) and there was no cut during the qualifying round or during the final round (only between qualifying and the final). The qualifying round also returned to the traditional fault scoring, rather than the positive points system used in 1988 and 1992.

All riders competed in the three runs of the qualifying round. The three-run total counted as the qualifying score. The top 25 riders advanced to the final, with a maximum of three riders per nation. The final consisted of two runs. The total of the two runs was used for the final score. A jump-off would be used if necessary to break ties for medal positions; other ties would not be broken.

== Schedule ==
All times are Eastern Daylight Time (UTC-4)

Date	Time	Round
Monday, 29 July 1996	8:30	Qualifying round 1
Thursday, 1 August 1996	8:30; 14:00	Qualifying round 2 Qualifying round 3
Sunday, 4 August 1996	14:00	Final round 1 Final round 2

== Results ==
Top 25 riders advanced to the final round, maximum of three riders per nation. Qualification round held 21 to 24 July. All scores were reset to zero after the third qualifying round. Final held 4 August 1996. 7 riders tied for second so an additional jump-off round was held.

The Argentine team was disqualified for animal cruelty during training.

Rank	Rider	Horse	Nation	Qualifying				Final			Jump-off
Rank	Rider	Horse	Nation	Round 1	Round 2	Round 3	Total	Round 1	Round 2	Total	Jump-off
1st place, gold medalist(s)	Ulrich Kirchhoff	Jus De Pommes	Germany	4.00	0.75	0.75	5.50	0.00	1.00	1.00	—N/a
2nd place, silver medalist(s)	Wilhelm Melliger	Calvaro	Switzerland	4.00	12.00	0.00	16.00	0.00	4.00	4.00	0.00
3rd place, bronze medalist(s)	Alexandra Ledermann	Rochet M	France	8.00	4.00	4.00	16.00	4.00	0.00	4.00	0.00
4	Hugo Simon	ET	Austria	4.00	4.00	8.00	16.00	4.00	0.00	4.00	4.00
5	Urs Fah	Jeremia	Switzerland	4.00	4.00	8.00	16.00	0.00	4.00	4.00	4.00
6	Geoff Billington	It's Otto	Great Britain	0.25	12.00	0.00	12.25	4.00	0.00	4.00	4.00
7	Jan Tops	Top Gun	Netherlands	0.00	0.00	4.25	4.25	0.00	4.00	4.00	8.00
8	Álvaro de Miranda Neto	Aspen	Brazil	8.00	0.25	8.00	16.25	0.00	4.00	4.00	16.00
9	Rodrigo de Paula Pessoa	Tomboy	Brazil	1.25	0.00	0.75	2.00	4.00	0.25	4.25	—N/a
9	John Whitaker	Welham	Great Britain	4.00	4.00	14.50	22.50	4.00	0.25	4.25	—N/a
11	Anton-Martin Bauer	Vesuve Paluelle	Austria	4.00	0.00	8.00	12.00	0.00	8.00	8.00	—N/a
11	Leslie Burr-Howard	Extreme	United States	0.00	14.00	0.00	14.00	4.00	4.00	8.00	—N/a
11	Peter Charles	Beneton	Ireland	13.75	0.00	4.00	17.75	0.00	8.00	8.00	—N/a
11	Jozef Lansink	Carthago	Netherlands	4.00	8.00	8.00	20.00	4.00	4.00	8.00	—N/a
11	Beat Maendli	City Banking	Switzerland	4.00	8.00	4.00	16.00	4.00	4.00	8.00	—N/a
11	Fernando Sarasola	Ennio	Spain	10.00	0.00	0.25	10.25	0.00	8.00	8.00	—N/a
17	Herve Godignon	Viking Du Tillard	France	4.25	4.25	0.00	8.50	0.00	9.00	9.00	—N/a
18	Andre Bier Johannpeter	Calei	Brazil	8.25	4.25	8.00	20.50	4.00	8.00	12.00	—N/a
19	Jerry Smit	Constantijn	Italy	8.25	4.00	4.00	16.25	4.00	8.25	12.25	—N/a
20	Anne Kursinski	Feliciano	United States	0.00	0.00	8.00	8.00	4.00	12.00	16.00	—N/a
20	Ludo Philippaerts	King Darko	Belgium	0.00	4.00	0.00	4.00	4.00	12.00	16.00	—N/a
20	Lars Nieberg	For Pleasure	Germany	8.00	0.00	12.00	20.00	0.00	16.00	16.00	—N/a
23	Nick Skelton	Show Time	Great Britain	12.00	8.00	4.00	24.00	4.00	12.25	16.25	—N/a
24	Rutherford Latham	Sourire d'Aze	Spain	5.00	8.00	8.00	21.00	4.00	12.50	16.50	—N/a
25	Helmut Morbitzer	Racal	Austria	0.00	16.00	4.00	20.00	4.00	25.00	29.00	—N/a
26	Ludger Beerbaum	Ratina	Germany	0.00	0.00	0.25	0.25	Did not advance			—N/a
27	Michael Matz	Rhum	United States	4.00	4.00	4.00	12.00	Did not advance			—N/a
27	Valerio Sozzi	Gaston M	Italy	0.00	12.00	0.00	12.00	Did not advance			—N/a
28	Roger-Yves Bost	Souviens Toi	France	4.75	8.00	0.00	12.75	Did not advance			—N/a
29	Takeshi Shirai	Vicomte Du Mesnil	Japan	2.00	8.25	4.50	14.75	Did not advance			—N/a
30	Peter Eriksson	Robin	Sweden	4.00	8.00	4.00	16.00	Did not advance			—N/a
30	Peter Leone	Legato	United States	12.00	4.00	0.00	16.00	Did not advance			—N/a
32	Patrice Delaveau	Roxane De Gruchy	France	0.50	8.00	8.00	16.50	Did not advance			—N/a
33	Jaime Guerra	Risueno	Mexico	4.00	9.50	4.00	17.50	Did not advance			—N/a
35	Alejandro Jordá	Hernando Du Sablon	Spain	5.00	5.00	8.50	18.50	Did not advance			—N/a
36	Natale Chiaudani	Rheingold De Luyne	Italy	4.00	12.00	4.00	20.00	Did not advance			—N/a
36	Emile Hendrix	Finesse	Netherlands	4.00	12.00	4.00	20.00	Did not advance			—N/a
38	Jessica Chesney-Kürten	Diamond Exchange	Ireland	8.00	8.50	4.00	20.50	Did not advance			—N/a
39	Eddie Macken	Schalkhaar	Ireland	4.00	4.00	14.00	22.00	Did not advance			—N/a
40	Ramzy Al-Duhami	Let's Talk About	Saudi Arabia	1.50	5.00	16.75	23.25	Did not advance			—N/a
41	Bert Romp	Samantha	Netherlands	4.00	8.00	12.00	24.00	Did not advance			—N/a
41	Pedro Sanchez	Riccarda	Spain	4.00	8.00	12.00	24.00	Did not advance			—N/a
41	Manuel Torres	Cartagena	Colombia	12.00	12.00	0.00	24.00	Did not advance			—N/a
44	Khaled el-Eid	Eastern Knight	Saudi Arabia	8.25	8.50	8.00	24.75	Did not advance			—N/a
45	Maria Gretzer	Marcoville	Sweden	9.00	4.00	12.50	25.50	Did not advance			—N/a
46	Rolf-Goran Bengtsson	Paradiso	Sweden	4.00	4.00	20.00	28.00	Did not advance			—N/a
46	Ian Millar	Play It Again	Canada	8.00	12.00	8.00	28.00	Did not advance			—N/a
48	Luiz Felipe de Azevedo	Cassiana	Brazil	17.00	8.00	4.00	29.00	Did not advance			—N/a
48	Malin Baryard	Corrmint	Sweden	12.50	12.25	4.25	29.00	Did not advance			—N/a
50	Antonio Chedraui	Elastique	Mexico	4.00	20.00	8.00	32.00	Did not advance			—N/a
50	Stanny Van Paesschen	Mulga Bill	Belgium	12.00	12.00	8.00	32.00	Did not advance			—N/a
52	Malcolm Cone	Elute	Canada	8.25	12.00	12.00	32.25	Did not advance			—N/a
53	Michel Blaton	Revoulino	Belgium	9.00	17.75	8.50	35.25	Did not advance			—N/a
54	José Madariaga	Genius	Mexico	0.50	20.00	16.25	36.75	Did not advance			—N/a
55	Vicki Roycroft	Coalminer	Australia	8.00	16.00	16.00	40.00	Did not advance			—N/a
56	Arnaldo Bologni	Eileen	Italy	8.00	12.00	24.00	44.00	Did not advance			—N/a
57	Yoshihiro Nakano	Sisal De Jalesnes	Japan	16.50	8.00	20.00	44.50	Did not advance			—N/a
58	Miguel Leal	Surcouf De Revel	Portugal	12.00	21.00	12.50	45.50	Did not advance			—N/a
58	Linda Southern-Heathcott	Advantage	Canada	12.75	12.00	20.75	45.50	Did not advance			—N/a
60	Alfonso Romo	Flash	Mexico	27.75	12.00	8.00	47.75	Did not advance			—N/a
61	Russell Johnstone	Southern Contrast	Australia	12.00	24.00	12.00	48.00	Did not advance			—N/a
62	Taizo Sugitani	Countryman	Japan	16.75	16.00	16.00	48.75	Did not advance			—N/a
63	Michael Whitaker	Two Step	Great Britain	22.25	16.00	12.00	50.25	Did not advance			—N/a
64	Damian Gardiner	Arthos	Ireland	8.00	28.50	16.00	52.50	Did not advance			—N/a
65	Markus Fuchs	Adelfos	Switzerland	31.25	8.00	16.00	55.25	Did not advance			—N/a
66	Christopher Delia	Silent Sam	Canada	8.00	16.00	32.00	56.00	Did not advance			—N/a
67	Eric Wauters	Bon Ami	Belgium	4.00	16.00	37.50	57.50	Did not advance			—N/a
68	Antonio Vozone	Mr. Cer	Portugal	13.75	17.25	28.25	59.25	Did not advance			—N/a
69	Daniel Meech	Future Vision	New Zealand	40.25	12.00	8.00	60.25	Did not advance			—N/a
70	Denise Cojuangco	Chouman	Philippines	9.75	27.25	26.00	63.00	Did not advance			—N/a
71	David Cooper	Red Sails	Australia	24.00	40.25	24.00	88.25	Did not advance			—N/a
—	Alexander Earle	Same Old Song	Puerto Rico	16.50	Elim.	34.75	Elim.	Did not advance			—N/a
—	Jennifer Parlevliet	Another Flood	Australia	5.75	37.00	—	DNF	Did not advance			—N/a
—	Kenji Morimoto	Alcazar	Japan	5.00	Elim.	—	DNF	Did not advance			—N/a
—	Kamal Bahamdan	Missouri	Saudi Arabia	8.00	24.25	—	DNF	Did not advance			—N/a
—	Alejandro Davila	Ejmplo	Colombia	16.00	36.25	—	DNF	Did not advance			—N/a
—	Franke Sloothaak	Joly	Germany	4.00	Elim.	—	DNF	Did not advance			—N/a
—	Thomas Metzger	Royal Flash	Austria	Elim.	—	—	DNF	Did not advance			—N/a
—	Justo Albarracin	Dinastia Pampero	Argentina	~~12.00~~	~~8.00~~	~~4.00~~	~~24.00~~ DSQ	Did not advance			—N/a
—	Ricardo Kierkegaard	Renomme	Argentina	~~4.50~~	~~20.00~~	~~5.25~~	~~29.75~~ DSQ	Did not advance			—N/a
—	Federico Castaing	Landlord	Argentina	~~28.00~~	~~16.00~~	~~24.00~~	~~68.00~~ DSQ	Did not advance			—N/a
—	Oscar Fuentes	Henry J. Speed	Argentina	~~12.75~~	Elim.	—	DNF DSQ	Did not advance			—N/a
