= Equestrian at the 1996 Summer Olympics – Team jumping =

Team jumping at the Games of the XXVI Olympiad
- Venue: Georgia International Horse Park
- Date: 31 July 1996 (round 1); 1 August 1996 (round 2)
- Competitors: 19 teams from 19 nations

Medalists
1st place, gold medalist(s)		Ludger Beerbaum, Ulrich Kirchhoff, Lars Nieberg, Franke Sloothaak	Germany
2nd place, silver medalist(s)		Peter Leone, Anne Kursinski, Michael Matz, Leslie Burr-Howard	United States
3rd place, bronze medalist(s)		Rodrigo Pessoa, Alvaro Miranda Neto, Luiz Felipe De Azevedo, André Johannpeter	Brazil

The team jumping event, part of the equestrian program at the 1996 Summer Olympics was held on 31 July and 1 August 1996 at the Georgia International Horse Park in Conyers, Georgia. The results of the second and third round of the individual jumping were used to award rankings. Like all other equestrian events, the competition was mixed gender, with both male and female athletes competing in the same division. Fourteen teams, each consisting of four horse and rider pairs, entered the contest.

== Medalists ==
Gold:		Silver:		Bronze:	
Germany		United States		Brazil	
Lars Nieberg	For Pleasure	Anne Kursinski	Eros	Alvaro Miranda Neto	Aspen
Franke Sloothaak	Joly	Leslie Burr-Howard	Extreme	Andre Johannpeter	Calei
Ulrich Kirchhoff	Jus De Pommes	Peter Leone	Legato	Luiz Felipe De Azevedo	Cassiana
Ludger Beerbaum	Ratina	Michael Matz	Rhum	Rodrigo Pessoa	Tomboy

== Results ==
=== Round 1 ===
Each team consisted of four pairs of horse and rider. The penalty points of the lowest three pairs were added together to reach the team's penalty points.

Rank	NOC	Rider	Horse	Scored	Total	Team Total
1	Germany	Lars Nieberg	For Pleasure	#	0.00	0.75
1	Germany	Franke Sloothaak	Joly		60.25	0.75
1	Germany	Ulrich Kirchhoff	Jus De Pommes	#	0.75	0.75
1	Germany	Ludger Beerbaum	Ratina	#	0.00	0.75
2	Brazil	Alvaro Miranda Neto	Aspen	#	0.25	4.50
2	Brazil	Andre Johannpeter	Calei	#	4.25	4.50
2	Brazil	Luiz Felipe de Azevedo	Cassiana		8.00	4.50
2	Brazil	Rodrigo Pessoa	Tomboy	#	0.00	4.50
3	United States	Anne Kursinski	Eros	#	0.00	8.00
3	United States	Leslie Burr-Howard	Extreme		14.00	8.00
3	United States	Peter Leone	Legato	#	4.00	8.00
3	United States	Michael Matz	Rhum	#	4.00	8.00
4	Ireland	Damian Gardiner	Arthros		28.50	12.50
4	Ireland	Peter Charles	Beneton	#	0.00	12.50
4	Ireland	Jessica Chesney	Diamond Exchange	#	8.50	12.50
4	Ireland	Eddie Macken	Schalkhaar	#	4.00	12.50
5	Spain	Fernando Sarasola	Ennio	#	0.00	13.00
5	Spain	Rutherford Latham	Sourire d'Aze		8.00	13.00
5	Spain	Alenjandro Jorda	Hernando Du Sablon	#	5.00	13.00
5	Spain	Pedro Sanchez	Riccarda	#	8.00	13.00
6	Netherlands	Jos Lansink	Carthago	#	8.00	16.00
6	Netherlands	Emile Hendrix	Finesse		12.00	16.00
6	Netherlands	Bert Romp	Samantha	#	8.00	16.00
6	Netherlands	Jan Tops	Top Gun	#	0.00	16.00
6	Sweden	Malin Baryard	Corrmint		12.25	16.00
6	Sweden	Maria Gretzer	Marcoville	#	4.00	16.00
6	Sweden	Rolf-Goran Bengtsson	Paradiso	#	4.00	16.00
6	Sweden	Peter Eriksson	Robin	#	8.00	16.00
8	France	Alexandra Ledermann	Rochet M	#	4.00	16.25
8	France	Patrice Delaveau	Roxane De Gruchy		8.00	16.25
8	France	Roger-Yves Bost	Souviens Toi	#	8.00	16.25
8	France	Herve Godignon	Viking Du Tillard	#	4.25	16.25
9	Austria	Hugo Simon	ET	#	4.00	20.00
9	Austria	Helmut Morbitzer	Racal	#	16.00	20.00
9	Austria	Anton-Martin Bauer	Remus	#	0.00	20.00
9	Austria	Thomas Metzger	Royal Flash		60.25	20.00
9	Switzerland	Willi Melliger	Calvaro V		12.00	20.00
9	Switzerland	Beat Maendli	City Banking	#	8.00	20.00
9	Switzerland	Markus Fuchs	Adelfos	#	8.00	20.00
9	Switzerland	Urs Fah	Jeremia	#	4.00	20.00
11	Great Britain	Geoff Billington	It's Otto	#	12.00	24.00
11	Great Britain	Nick Skelton	Show Time	#	8.00	24.00
11	Great Britain	Michael Whitaker	Two Step		16.00	24.00
11	Great Britain	John Whitaker	Welham	#	4.00	24.00
12	Italy	Arnaldo Bologni	Eileen	#	12.00	28.00
12	Italy	Natale Chiaudani	Rheingold De Luyne		12.00	28.00
12	Italy	Jerry Smit	Constantijn	#	4.00	28.00
12	Italy	Valerio Sozzi	Gaston M	#	12.00	28.00
13	Belgium	Eric Wauters	Bon Ami	#	16.00	32.00
13	Belgium	Stanny Van Paesschen	Mulga Bill	#	12.00	32.00
13	Belgium	Michel Blaton	Revoulino		17.75	32.00
13	Belgium	Ludo Philippaerts	King Darko	#	4.00	32.00
14	Japan	Kenji Morimoto	Alcazar		60.25	32.25
14	Japan	Taizo Sugitani	Countryman	#	16.00	32.25
14	Japan	Yoshihiro Nakano	Sisal De Jalesnes	#	8.00	32.25
14	Japan	Takeshi Shirai	Vicomte Du Mesnil	#	8.25	32.25
15	Canada	Linda Southern-Heathcott	Advantage	#	12.00	36.00
15	Canada	Malcolm Cone	Elute	#	12.00	36.00
15	Canada	Ian Millar	Play It Again	#	12.00	36.00
15	Canada	Christopher Delia	Silent Sam		16.00	36.00
16	Saudi Arabia	Khaled Al-Eid	Eastern Knight	#	8.50	37.75
16	Saudi Arabia	Ramzy Al-Duhami	Let's Talk About	#	5.00	37.75
16	Saudi Arabia	Kamal Bahamdan	Missouri	#	24.25	37.75
17	Mexico	Antonio Chedraui	Elastique	#	20.00	41.50
17	Mexico	Alfonso Romo	Flash	#	12.00	41.50
17	Mexico	Jose Madariaga	Genius		20.00	41.50
17	Mexico	Jaime Guerra	Risueno	#	9.50	41.50
18	Australia	Jennifer Parlevliet	Another Flood	#	37.00	77.00
18	Australia	Vicki Roycroft	Coalminer	#	16.00	77.00
18	Australia	David Cooper	Red Sails		40.25	77.00
18	Australia	Russell Johnstone	Southern Contrast	#	24.00	77.00
DSQ	Argentina	Justo Albarracin	Dinastia Pampero	#	8.00	44.00
DSQ	Argentina	Oscar Fuentes	Henry J. Speed		60.25	44.00
DSQ	Argentina	Federico Castaing	Landlord	#	16.00	44.00
DSQ	Argentina	Ricardo Kierkegaard	Renomme	#	20.00	44.00

=== Round 2 ===
Each team consisted of four pairs of horse and rider. The penalty points of the lowest three pairs were added together to reach the team's penalty points.

Rank	NOC	Rider	Horse	Scored	Total	Team Total
1	Germany	Lars Nieberg	For Pleasure		12.00	1.00
1	Germany	Franke Sloothaak	Joly	#	0.00	1.00
1	Germany	Ulrich Kirchhoff	Jus De Pommes	#	0.75	1.00
1	Germany	Ludger Beerbaum	Ratina	#	0.25	1.00
2	France	Alexandra Ledermann	Rochet M	#	4.00	4.00
2	France	Patrice Delaveau	Roxane De Gruchy		8.00	4.00
2	France	Roger-Yves Bost	Souviens Toi	#	0.00	4.00
2	France	Herve Godignon	Viking Du Tillard	#	0.00	4.00
2	United States	Anne Kursinski	Eros		8.00	4.00
2	United States	Leslie Burr-Howard	Extreme	#	0.00	4.00
2	United States	Peter Leone	Legato	#	0.00	4.00
2	United States	Michael Matz	Rhum	#	4.00	4.00
4	Italy	Arnaldo Bologni	Eileen		24.00	8.00
4	Italy	Natale Chiaudani	Rheingold De Luyne	#	4.00	8.00
4	Italy	Jerry Smit	Constantijn	#	4.00	8.00
4	Italy	Valerio Sozzi	Gaston M	#	0.00	8.00
5	Switzerland	Willi Melliger	Calvaro	#	0.00	12.00
5	Switzerland	Beat Maendli	City Banking	#	4.00	12.00
5	Switzerland	Markus Fuchs	Adelfos		16.00	12.00
5	Switzerland	Urs Fah	Jeremia	#	8.00	12.00
6	Brazil	Alvaro Miranda Neto	Aspen		8.00	12.75
6	Brazil	Andre Johannpeter	Calei	#	8.00	12.75
6	Brazil	Luiz Felipe de Azevedo	Cassiana	#	4.00	12.75
6	Brazil	Rodrigo Pessoa	Tomboy	#	0.75	12.75
7	Great Britain	Geoff Billington	It's Otto	#	0.00	16.00
7	Great Britain	Nick Skelton	Show Time	#	4.00	16.00
7	Great Britain	Michael Whitaker	Two Step	#	12.00	16.00
7	Great Britain	John Whitaker	Welham		14.50	16.00
8	Netherlands	Jos Lansink	Carthago	#	8.00	16.25
8	Netherlands	Emile Hendrix	Finesse	#	4.00	16.25
8	Netherlands	Bert Romp	Samantha		12.00	16.25
8	Netherlands	Jan Tops	Top Gun	#	4.25	16.25
9	Belgium	Eric Wauters	Bon Ami		37.50	16.50
9	Belgium	Stanny Van Paesschen	Mulga Bill	#	8.00	16.50
9	Belgium	Michel Blaton	Revoulino	#	8.50	16.50
9	Belgium	Ludo Philippaerts	King Darko	#	0.00	16.50
10	Spain	Fernando Sarasola	Ennio	#	0.25	16.75
10	Spain	Rutherford Latham	Sourire d'Aze	#	8.00	16.75
10	Spain	Alenjandro Jorda	Hernando Du Sablon	#	8.50	16.75
10	Spain	Pedro Sanchez	Riccarda		12.00	16.75
11	Austria	Hugo Simon	ET	#	8.00	20.00
11	Austria	Helmut Morbitzer	Racal	#	4.00	20.00
11	Austria	Anton-Martin Bauer	Remus	#	8.00	20.00
11	Austria	Thomas Metzger	Royal Flash		57.50	20.00
11	Mexico	Antonio Chedraui	Elastique	#	8.00	20.00
11	Mexico	Alfonso Romo	Flash	#	8.00	20.00
11	Mexico	Jose Madariaga	Genius		16.25	20.00
11	Mexico	Jaime Guerra	Risueno	#	4.00	20.00
13	Sweden	Malin Baryard	Corrmint	#	4.25	20.75
13	Sweden	Maria Gretzer	Marcoville	#	12.50	20.75
13	Sweden	Rolf-Goran Bengtsson	Paradiso		20.00	20.75
13	Sweden	Peter Eriksson	Robin	#	4.00	20.75
14	Ireland	Damian Gardiner	Arthros		16.00	22.00
14	Ireland	Peter Charles	Beneton	#	4.00	22.00
14	Ireland	Jessica Chesney	Diamond Exchange	#	4.00	22.00
14	Ireland	Eddie Macken	Schalkhaar	#	14.00	22.00
15	Japan	Kenji Morimoto	Alcazar		57.50	40.00
15	Japan	Taizo Sugitani	Countryman	#	16.00	40.00
15	Japan	Yoshihiro Nakano	Sisal De Jalesnes	#	8.00	40.00
15	Japan	Takeshi Shirai	Vicomte Du Mesnil	#	8.25	40.00
16	Canada	Linda Southern-Heathcott	Advantage	#	20.75	40.75
16	Canada	Malcolm Cone	Elute	#	12.00	40.75
16	Canada	Ian Millar	Play It Again	#	8.00	40.75
16	Canada	Christopher Delia	Silent Sam		32.00	40.75
17	Australia	Jennifer Parlevliet	Another Flood		57.50	52.00
17	Australia	Vicki Roycroft	Coalminer	#	16.00	52.00
17	Australia	David Cooper	Red Sails	#	24.00	52.00
17	Australia	Russell Johnstone	Southern Contrast	#	12.00	52.00
18	Saudi Arabia	Khaled Al-Eid	Eastern Knight	#	8.00	82.25
18	Saudi Arabia	Ramzy Al-Duhami	Let's Talk About	#	16.75	82.25
18	Saudi Arabia	Kamal Bahamdan	Missouri	#	57.50	82.25
DSQ	Argentina	Justo Albarracin	Dinastia Pampero	#	4.00	33.25
DSQ	Argentina	Oscar Fuentes	Henry J. Speed		57.50	33.25
DSQ	Argentina	Federico Castaing	Landlord	#	24.00	33.25
DSQ	Argentina	Ricardo Kierkegaard	Renomme	#	5.25	33.25

=== Final standings ===
Rank	NOC	Rider	Horse	Scored	Round 1	Scored	Round 2	Team Total
1	Germany	Lars Nieberg	For Pleasure	#	0.00		12.00	1.75
1	Germany	Franke Sloothaak	Joly		60.25	#	0.00	1.75
1	Germany	Ulrich Kirchhoff	Jus De Pommes	#	0.75	#	0.75	1.75
1	Germany	Ludger Beerbaum	Ratina	#	0.00	#	0.25	1.75
2	United States	Anne Kursinski	Eros	#	0.00		8.00	12.00
2	United States	Leslie Burr-Howard	Extreme		14.00	#	0.00	12.00
2	United States	Peter Leone	Legato	#	4.00	#	0.00	12.00
2	United States	Michael Matz	Rhum	#	4.00	#	4.00	12.00
3	Brazil	Alvaro Miranda Neto	Aspen	#	0.25		8.00	17.25
3	Brazil	Andre Johannpeter	Calei	#	4.25	#	8.00	17.25
3	Brazil	Luiz Felipe de Azevedo	Cassiana		8.00	#	4.00	17.25
3	Brazil	Rodrigo Pessoa	Tomboy	#	0.00	#	0.75	17.25
4	France	Alexandra Ledermann	Rochet M	#	4.00	#	4.00	20.25
4	France	Patrice Delaveau	Roxane De Gruchy		8.00		8.00	20.25
4	France	Roger-Yves Bost	Souviens Toi	#	8.00	#	0.00	20.25
4	France	Herve Godignon	Viking Du Tillard	#	4.25	#	0.00	20.25
5	Spain	Fernando Sarasola	Ennio		0.00	#	0.25	29.75
5	Spain	Rutherford Latham	Sourire d'Aze	#	8.00	#	8.00	29.75
5	Spain	Alenjandro Jorda	Hernando Du Sablon	#	5.00	#	8.50	29.75
5	Spain	Pedro Sanchez	Riccarda	#	8.00		12.00	29.75
6	Switzerland	Willi Melliger	Calvaro		12.00	#	0.00	32.00
6	Switzerland	Beat Maendli	City Banking	#	8.00	#	4.00	32.00
6	Switzerland	Markus Fuchs	Adelfos	#	8.00		16.00	32.00
6	Switzerland	Urs Fah	Jeremia	#	4.00	#	8.00	32.00
7	Netherlands	Jos Lansink	Carthago	#	8.00	#	8.00	32.25
7	Netherlands	Emile Hendrix	Finesse		12.00	#	4.00	32.25
7	Netherlands	Bert Romp	Samantha	#	8.00		12.00	32.25
7	Netherlands	Jan Tops	Top Gun	#	0.00	#	4.25	32.25
8	Ireland	Damian Gardiner	Arthros		28.50		16.00	34.50
8	Ireland	Peter Charles	Beneton	#	0.00	#	4.00	34.50
8	Ireland	Jessica Chesney	Diamond Exchange	#	8.50	#	4.00	34.50
8	Ireland	Eddie Macken	Schalkhaar	#	4.00	#	14.00	34.50
9	Italy	Arnaldo Bologni	Eileen	#	12.00		24.00	36.00
9	Italy	Natale Chiaudani	Rheingold De Luyne		12.00	#	4.00	36.00
9	Italy	Jerry Smit	Constantijn	#	4.00	#	4.00	36.00
9	Italy	Valerio Sozzi	Gaston M	#	12.00	#	0.00	36.00
10	Sweden	Malin Baryard	Corrmint		12.25	#	4.25	36.75
10	Sweden	Maria Gretzer	Marcoville	#	4.00	#	12.50	36.75
10	Sweden	Rolf-Goran Bengtsson	Paradiso	#	4.00		20.00	36.75
10	Sweden	Peter Eriksson	Robin	#	8.00	#	4.00	36.75
11	Austria	Hugo Simon	ET	#	4.00	#	8.00	40.00
11	Austria	Helmut Morbitzer	Racal	#	16.00	#	4.00	40.00
11	Austria	Anton-Martin Bauer	Remus	#	0.00	#	8.00	40.00
11	Austria	Thomas Metzger	Royal Flash		60.25		57.50	40.00
11	Great Britain	Geoff Billington	It's Otto	#	12.00	#	0.00	40.00
11	Great Britain	Nick Skelton	Show Time	#	8.00	#	4.00	40.00
11	Great Britain	Michael Whitaker	Two Step		16.00	#	12.00	40.00
11	Great Britain	John Whitaker	Welham	#	4.00		14.50	40.00
13	Belgium	Eric Wauters	Bon Ami	#	16.00		37.50	48.50
13	Belgium	Stanny Van Paesschen	Mulga Bill	#	12.00	#	8.00	48.50
13	Belgium	Michel Blaton	Revoulino		17.75	#	8.50	48.50
13	Belgium	Ludo Philippaerts	King Darko	#	4.00	#	0.00	48.50
14	Mexico	Antonio Chedraui	Elastique	#	20.00	#	8.00	61.50
14	Mexico	Alfonso Romo	Flash	#	12.00	#	8.00	61.50
14	Mexico	Jose Madariaga	Genius		20.00		16.25	61.50
14	Mexico	Jaime Guerra	Risueno	#	9.50	#	4.00	61.50
15	Japan	Kenji Morimoto	Alcazar		60.25		57.50	72.75
15	Japan	Taizo Sugitani	Countryman	#	16.00	#	16.00	72.75
15	Japan	Yoshihiro Nakano	Sisal De Jalesnes	#	8.00	#	8.00	72.75
15	Japan	Takeshi Shirai	Vicomte Du Mesnil	#	8.25	#	4.50	72.75
16	Canada	Linda Southern-Heathcott	Advantage	#	12.00	#	20.75	76.75
16	Canada	Malcolm Cone	Elute	#	12.00	#	12.00	76.75
16	Canada	Ian Millar	Play It Again	#	12.00	#	8.00	76.75
16	Canada	Christopher Delia	Silent Sam		16.00		32.00	76.75
17	Saudi Arabia	Khaled Al-Eid	Eastern Knight	#	8.50	#	8.00	120.00
17	Saudi Arabia	Ramzy Al-Duhami	Let's Talk About	#	5.00	#	16.75	120.00
17	Saudi Arabia	Kamal Bahamdan	Missouri	#	24.25	#	57.50	120.00
18	Australia	Jennifer Parlevliet	Another Flood	#	37.00		57.50	129.00
18	Australia	Vicki Roycroft	Coalminer	#	16.00	#	16.00	129.00
18	Australia	David Cooper	Red Sails	#	40.25	#	24.00	129.00
18	Australia	Russell Johnstone	Southern Contrast	#	24.00	#	12.00	129.00
DSQ	Argentina	Justo Albarracin	Dinastia Pampero	#	8.00	#	4.00	77.25
DSQ	Argentina	Oscar Fuentes	Henry J. Speed		60.25		57.50	77.25
DSQ	Argentina	Federico Castaing	Landlord	#	16.00	#	24.00	77.25
DSQ	Argentina	Ricardo Kierkegaard	Renomme	#	20.00	#	5.25	77.25

Note: Argentina originally finished 17th, but were disqualified after FEI officials discovered that, prior to coming to the Olympics, they had forced their horses to practice by jumping over obstacles topped with barbed wire and nails.
