= Mexico at the 1996 Summer Olympics =

- IOC code: MEX
- NOC: Mexican Olympic Committee
- Website: www.soycom.org (in Spanish)

in Atlanta
- Competitors: 97 in 19 sports
- Flag bearer: Nancy Contreras
- Medals Ranked 71st: Gold 0 Silver 0 Bronze 1 Total 1

Summer Olympics appearances (overview)
- 1900; 1904–1920; 1924; 1928; 1932; 1936; 1948; 1952; 1956; 1960; 1964; 1968; 1972; 1976; 1980; 1984; 1988; 1992; 1996; 2000; 2004; 2008; 2012; 2016; 2020; 2024; 2028

Mexico competed at the 1996 Summer Olympics in Atlanta, United States.

== Medalists ==
Medal	Name	Sport	Event	Date
Bronze	Bernardo Segura	Athletics	Men's 20 km walk	26 July

== Competitors ==
The following is the list of number of competitors in the Games.

Sport	Men	Women	Total
Archery	2	1	3
Athletics	11	4	15
Beach volleyball	0	2	2
Boxing	8	–	8
Canoeing	2	4	6
Cycling	7	2	9
Diving	3	2	5
Equestrian	5	0	5
Football	14	0	14
Judo	2	0	2
Modern pentathlon	2	–	2
Rowing	0	2	2
Sailing	2	0	2
Shooting	1	0	1
Swimming	2	0	2
Synchronized swimming	–	9	9
Table tennis	1	0	1
Tennis	2	1	3
Wrestling	7	–	7
Total	71	27	98

== Archery ==
In its fifth Olympic archery competition, Mexico entered three competitors. José Anchondo was the most successful, winning two matches before losing his third.

Athlete	Event	Ranking round		Round of 64	Round of 32	Round of 16	Quarterfinals	Semifinals	Final / BM	
Athlete	Event	Score	Seed	Opposition Score	Opposition Score	Opposition Score	Opposition Score	Opposition Score	Opposition Score	Rank
Andrés Anchondo	Men's individual	653	29	Kivilo (EST); W 158–157	Chikarev (KAZ); W 156–154	Torres (FRA); L 158–159	Did not advance			16
Adolfo González	Men's individual	636	52	Yamamoto (JPN); L 154–155	Did not advance					51
Marisol Bretón	Women's individual	638	29	Di Blasi (ITA); W 142–139	Kim (KOR); L 157–158	Did not advance				18

== Athletics ==
Key

- Note–Ranks given for track events are within the athlete's heat only
- Q = Qualified for the next round
- q = Qualified for the next round as a fastest loser or, in field events, by position without achieving the qualifying target
- NR = National record
- N/A = Round not applicable for the event
- Bye = Athlete not required to compete in round

Track & road events
Men

Athlete	Event	Heat		Semifinal		Final	
Athlete	Event	Result	Rank	Result	Rank	Result	Rank
Alejandro Cárdenas	400 m	45.85	3Q	45.33	5	Did not advance	
Armando Quintanilla	5000 m	Did not start		—N/a		Did not advance	
Martín Pitayo	10,000 m	30:32.20	19	—N/a		Did not advance	
Armando Quintanilla	10,000 m	28:27.28	8 Q	—N/a		28:09.46	11
Dionicio Cerón	Marathon	—N/a				2:16:48	15
Benjamín Paredes	Marathon	—N/a				2:14:55	8
Germán Silva	Marathon	—N/a				2:14:29	6
Daniel García	20 km walk	—N/a				1:24:10	19
Bernardo Segura	20 km walk	—N/a				1:20:23	3rd place, bronze medalist(s)
Miguel Ángel Rodríguez	20 km walk	—N/a				DSQ	
Daniel García	50 km walk	—N/a				4:19:00	44
Germán Sánchez	50 km walk	—N/a				3:57:47	18
Ignacio Zamudio	50 km walk	—N/a				3:46:07	6

Women

Athlete	Event	Heat		Semifinal		Final	
Athlete	Event	Result	Rank	Result	Rank	Result	Rank
María del Carmen Díaz	Marathon	—N/a				2:37:14	33
Adriana Fernández	Marathon	—N/a				2:44:23	51
Guadaloupe Loma	Marathon	—N/a				2:41:56	43
Graciela Mendoza	10 km walk	—N/a				45:13	18

== Boxing ==
Athlete	Event	Round of 32	Round of 16	Quarterfinals	Semifinals	Final	
Athlete	Event	Opposition Result	Opposition Result	Opposition Result	Opposition Result	Opposition Result	Rank
Jesús Martínez	Light heavyweight	Biki (MAS); W 15–4	Masara (INA); L 1–8	Did not advance			9
Martín Castillo	Flyweight	Lunka (GER); L 7–13	Did not advance				17
Samuel Álvarez	Bantamweight	Olteanu (ROM); L RSC	Did not advance				17
Francisco Martínez	Lightweight	Strange (CAN); L 1-15	Did not advance				17
Carlos Martínez	Light welterweight	Niyazymbetov (KAZ); L 3-25	Did not advance				17
Jesús Flores	Welterweight	Baloch (PAK); L 7-12	Did not advance				17
Juan Pablo López	Middleweight	Erdei (HUN); L RSC	Did not advance				17
Julio César González	Light heavyweight	Jirov (KAZ); L RSC	Did not advance				17

== Canoeing ==
=== Sprint ===
Men

Athlete	Event	Heats		Quarterfinals		Semifinals		Final	
Athlete	Event	Time	Rank	Time	Rank	Time	Rank	Time	Rank
Roberto Heinze Flamand; Ralph Heinze	Men's K-2 500 m	1:36.918	4 R	1:42.848	5	Did not advance			

Women

Athlete	Event	Heats		Quarterfinals		Semifinals		Final	
Athlete	Event	Time	Rank	Time	Rank	Time	Rank	Time	Rank
Erika Duron	Women's K-1 500 m	1:58.884	6 R	2:02.847	6	Did not advance			
Renata Hernández; Sandra Rojas	Women's K-2 500 m	1:51.252	7 R	1:55.801	5 SF	1:52.053	9	Did not advance	
Erika Duron; Renata Hernández; Sandra Rojas; Itzel Reza	Women's K-4 500 m	1:45.215	8	—N/a		Did not advance			

Qualification Legend: SF = Qualify to semifinal; R=Repechage

== Cycling ==
=== Road ===
Men

Athlete	Event	Time	Rank
Irving Aguilar	Road race	5:05:39	117
Domingo González	Road race	DNF	
Eduardo Graciano	Road race	4:56:49	71
Adan Juárez	Road race	DNF	
Eduardo Uribe	Road race	4:56:51	90
Jesús Zárate	Time trial	1:11:42	30

=== Track ===
Sprint

Athlete	Event	Qualification		Round 1	Repechage	Round 2	Repechage 2	Round of 16	Repechage 3	Quarterfinals	Semifinals	Final	
Athlete	Event	Time Speed (km/h)	Rank	Opposition Time Speed (km/h)	Opposition Time Speed (km/h)	Opposition Time Speed (km/h)	Opposition Time Speed (km/h)	Opposition Time Speed (km/h)	Opposition Time Speed (km/h)	Opposition Time Speed (km/h)	Opposition Time Speed (km/h)	Opposition Time Speed (km/h)	Rank
Nancy Contreras	Women's sprint	11.992	14	Did not advance									

Points race

Athlete	Event	Laps	Points	Rank
Marco Zaragoza	Men's points race	DNF		
Belem Guerrero	Women's points race	±0 laps	4	11

== Diving ==
Men

Athlete	Event	Preliminary		Semifinal		Final	
Athlete	Event	Points	Rank	Points	Rank	Points	Rank
Fernando Platas	3 metre springboard	382.83	8 Q	600.45	8 Q	619.98	8
Joel Rodríguez	3 metre springboard	296.91	30	Did not advance			
Alberto Acosta	10 metre platform	322.47	22	Did not advance			
Fernando Platas	10 metre platform	392.31	8 Q	570.21	7 Q	603.03	7

Women

Athlete	Event	Preliminary		Semifinal		Final	
Athlete	Event	Points	Rank	Points	Rank	Points	Rank
María José Alcalá	3 metre springboard	257.01	12 Q	450.63	13	Did not advance	
María Elena Romero	3 metre springboard	252.84	13 Q	440.19	17	Did not advance	
María José Alcalá	10 metre platform	252.36	13 Q	400.35	17	Did not advance	

== Equestrian ==
=== Dressage ===
Athlete	Horse	Event	Grand Prix		Grand Prix Special			Grand Prix Freestyle		Overall	
Athlete	Horse	Event	Score	Rank	Score	Total	Rank	Score	Rank	Score	Rank
Joaquin Orth	Bellini	Individual	60.72	39	Did not advance						

=== Jumping ===
Athlete	Horse	Event	Qualification								Final					
Athlete	Horse	Event	Round 1		Round 2		Round 3		Total		Round 1		Round 2		Total	
Athlete	Horse	Event	Score	Rank	Score	Rank	Score	Rank	Score	Rank	Penalties	Rank	Penalties	Rank	Penalties	Rank
Antonio Chedraui	Elastique	Individual	4.00	14	20.00	65	8.00	31	32.00	50	Did not advance					
Jaime Guerra	Risueno	Individual	4.00	14	9.50	41	4.00	14	17.50	26	Did not advance					
José Madariaga	Genius	Individual	0.50	9	20.00	65	16.25	61	36.75	54	Did not advance					
Alfonso Romo	Flash	Individual	27.75	75	12.00	42	8.00	31	47.75	60	Did not advance					
Antonio Chedraui; Jaime Guerra; José Madariaga; Alfonso Romo]	See above	Team	—N/a								41.50	17	20.00	11	61.50	14

== Football ==
=== Summary ===
Key:

- A.E.T – After extra time.
- P – Match decided by penalty-shootout.

Team	Event	Group stage				Quarterfinal	Semifinal	Final / BM	
Team	Event	Opposition Score	Opposition Score	Opposition Score	Rank	Opposition Score	Opposition Score	Opposition Score	Rank
Mexico men's	Men's tournament	Italy; W 1–0	South Korea; D 0–0	Ghana; D 1–1	1 Q	Nigeria; L 0–2	Did not advance		

=== Men's tournament ===
Team roster

Head coach: Carlos de los Cobos

No.	Pos.	Player	Date of birth (age)	Caps	Club
1	GK	Oswaldo Sánchez	21 September 1973 (aged 22)		(Mexico) América
2	DF	Claudio Suárez*	16 December 1968 (aged 27)		(Mexico) UNAM
3	DF	David Oteo	27 July 1973 (aged 22)		(Mexico) UNAM
4	MF	Germán Villa	2 April 1973 (aged 23)		(Mexico) América
5	DF	Duilio Davino	21 March 1976 (aged 20)		(Mexico) UAG
6	MF	Raúl Lara	28 February 1973 (aged 23)		(Mexico) América
7	MF	Rafael García	14 August 1974 (aged 21)		(Mexico) UNAM
8	MF	Manuel Sol	31 August 1973 (aged 22)		(Mexico) Necaxa
9	GK	Jorge Campos*	15 October 1966 (aged 29)		(United States) Los Angeles Galaxy
10	MF	Luis García*	1 June 1969 (aged 27)		(Mexico) América
11	FW	Cuauhtémoc Blanco	17 January 1973 (aged 23)		(Mexico) América
12	DF	Francisco Sánchez	30 January 1973 (aged 23)		(Mexico) América
13	DF	Pável Pardo	26 July 1976 (aged 19)		(Mexico) Atlas
14	MF	Edson Alvarado	27 September 1975 (aged 20)		(Mexico) Necaxa
15	MF	Jesús Arellano	8 May 1973 (aged 23)		(Mexico) Monterrey
16	FW	Enrique Alfaro	11 December 1974 (aged 21)		(Mexico) Toluca
17	FW	Francisco Palencia	28 April 1973 (aged 23)		(Mexico) Cruz Azul
18	FW	José Manuel Abundis	11 June 1973 (aged 23)		(Mexico) Toluca

Group play

Team	Pld	W	D	L	GF	GA	GD	Pts
Mexico	3	1	2	0	2	1	+1	5
Ghana	3	1	1	1	4	4	0	4
South Korea	3	1	1	1	2	2	0	4
Italy	3	1	0	2	4	5	−1	3

Source: FIFA
21 July 1996
17:00

Mexico	1–0	Italy
Palencia 83'	Report

Legion Field, Birmingham, Alabama
Attendance: 44,211
Referee: Dallas (GBR)

23 July 1996
20:00

Mexico	0–0	South Korea
	Report

Legion Field, Birmingham, Alabama
Attendance: 26,111
Referee: Bouchardeau (NIG)

25 July 1996
21:00

Mexico	1–1	Ghana
Abundis 65'	Report	Ebenzer 44'

Robert F. Kennedy Stadium, Washington, D.C.
Attendance: 30,237
Referee: Pereira (BRA)

Quarterfinal

28 July 1996
16:00

Mexico	0–2	Nigeria
	Report	Okocha 20'; C. Babayaro 84'

Legion Field, Birmingham, Alabama
Attendance: 44,788
Referee: Al Mehannah (KSA)

== Judo ==
Men

Athlete	Event	Round of 64	Round of 32	Round of 16	Quarterfinals	Semifinals	Repechage			Final	
Athlete	Event	Round of 64	Round of 32	Round of 16	Quarterfinals	Semifinals	Round 1	Round 2	Round 3	Final	
Athlete	Event	Opposition Result	Opposition Result	Opposition Result	Opposition Result	Opposition Result	Opposition Result	Opposition Result	Opposition Result	Opposition Result	Rank
Ricardo Acuña	–60 kg	Bye	Power (AUS); W	Hüseynov (AZE); W	Giovinazzo (ITA); L	Did not advance	—N/a	Vazagashvili (GEO); L	Did not advance		
Arturo Gutiérrez	–95 kg	Bye	Morgan (CAN); L	Did not advance							

== Modern pentathlon ==
Athlete	Event	Shooting (Air pistol)			Fencing (épée one touch)			Swimming (300 m freestyle)			Riding (show jumping)			Running (4000 m)			Total points	Final rank
Athlete	Event	Points	Rank	MP Points	Results	Rank	MP points	Time	Rank	MP points	Penalties	Rank	MP points	Time	Rank	MP Points	Total points	Final rank
Horacio de la Vega	Individual	177	14	1060	12–19	25	700	3:17.92	8	1292	180	24	920	13:05.327	13	1210	5182	23
Sergio Salazar	Individual	170	25	976	18–13	7	880	3:20.04	13	1272	108	15	992	12:46.940	8	1267	5387	9

== Rowing ==
Women

Athlete	Event	Heats		Repechage		Semifinals		Final	
Athlete	Event	Time	Rank	Time	Rank	Time	Rank	Time	Rank
Ana Sofía Soberanes; Andrea Boltz	Lightweight double sculls	8:00.92	5 R	7:18.31	4 FC	—N/a		7:46.57	14

== Sailing ==
Men

Athlete	Event	Race									Net points	Final rank
Athlete	Event	1	2	3	4	5	6	7	8	9	Net points	Final rank
Pedro Silveira	Mistral One Design	33	~~35~~	~~35~~	28	19	32	31	31	30	204	34

Open
Fleet racing

Athlete	Event	Race											Net points	Final rank
Athlete	Event	1	2	3	4	5	6	7	8	9	10	11	Net points	Final rank
Antonio Goeters	Laser	34	38	~~42~~	30	~~43~~	36	17	24	23	33	30	265	33

== Shooting ==
Men

Athlete	Event	Qualification		Final	
Athlete	Event	Points	Rank	Points	Rank
Alejandro Fernández	Trap	118	31	Did not advance	

== Swimming ==
Men

Athlete	Event	Heats		Final A/B	
Athlete	Event	Time	Rank	Time	Rank
Carlos Arena	100 m backstroke	57.40	29	Did not advance	
Carlos Arena	200 m backstroke	2:05.96	30	Did not advance	
Jesús González	100 m butterfly	54.94	29	Did not advance	

== Synchronized swimming ==
Athlete	Event	Technical		Free		Total	
Athlete	Event	Score	Rank	Score	Rank	Score	Rank
Wendy Aguilar; Olivia González; Lilián Leal; Ingrid Reich; Aline Reich; Patricia Vila; Ariadna Medina; Berenice Guzmán; Erika Leal-Ramirez	Team	33.04	7	60.796	8	93.836	8

== Table tennis ==
Men

Athlete	Event	Group Stage				Round of 16	Quarterfinal	Semifinal	Final	
Athlete	Event	Opposition Result	Opposition Result	Opposition Result	Rank	Opposition Result	Opposition Result	Opposition Result	Opposition Result	Rank
Guillermo Muñoz	Singles	Roßkopf (GER); L 0–2	Shibutani (JPN); L 0–2	Lo (HKG); L 0–2	4	Did not advance				

== Tennis ==
Men

Athlete	Event	Round of 64	Round of 32	Round of 16	Quarterfinals	Semifinals	Final	
Athlete	Event	Opposition Result	Opposition Result	Opposition Result	Opposition Result	Opposition Result	Opposition Result	Rank
Alejandro Hernández	Singles	Ruud (NOR); L 3–6, 6–2, 6–8	Did not advance					
Óscar Ortiz	Singles	Pescariu (ROU); W 6–2, 6–2	Gaudenzi (ITA); L 1–6, 6^{5}–7	Did not advance				
Alejandro Hernández; Óscar Ortiz	Doubles	—N/a	Agassi / Washington (USA); L 2–6, 2–6	Did not advance				

Women

Athlete	Event	Round of 64	Round of 32	Round of 16	Quarterfinals	Semifinals	Final	
Athlete	Event	Opposition Result	Opposition Result	Opposition Result	Opposition Result	Opposition Result	Opposition Result	Rank
Angélica Gavaldón	Singles	Papadáki (GRE); W 6–1, 3–6, 6–2	Sabatini (ARG); L 4–6, 0–6	Did not advance				

== Volleyball ==
=== Beach ===
Athlete	Event	First round	Second round	Third round	Fourth round	Elimination					Semifinal	Final / BM	
Athlete	Event	Opposition Result	Opposition Result	Opposition Result	Opposition Result	Opposition Result	Opposition Result	Opposition Result	Opposition Result	Opposition Result	Opposition Result	Opposition Result	Rank
Mayra Huerta; Velia Eguiluz	Women's	Prawerman / Lesage (FRA); L 11–15	Did not advance			Yudhani Rahayu / Kaize (INA); L 5–15	Did not advance						

== Wrestling ==
Greco-Roman

Athlete	Event	Round of 32	Round of 16	Quarterfinals	Semifinals	Repechage					Final	
Athlete	Event	Round of 32	Round of 16	Quarterfinals	Semifinals	Round 1	Round 2	Round 3	Round 4	Round 5	Final	
Athlete	Event	Opposition Result	Opposition Result	Opposition Result	Opposition Result	Opposition Result	Opposition Result	Opposition Result	Opposition Result	Opposition Result	Opposition Result	Rank
Enrique Aguilar	–48 kg	Özdemir (TUR); L 0–11	Did not advance			Kado (JPN); L 0–10	Did not advance					
Armando Fernández	–57 kg	Yıldız (GER); L 0–12	Did not advance			Maia (POR); W 7–3	Nishimi (JPN); L 0–12	Did not advance				
Rodolfo Hernández	–74 kg	Morgan (USA); L 0–10	Did not advance			Bayseitov (KAZ); L Fall	Did not advance					
Guillermo Díaz	–130 kg	Poikilidis (GRE); L 0–10	Did not advance			Dgvareli (TJK); L 2–4	Did not advance					

Freestyle

Athlete	Event	Round of 32	Round of 16	Quarterfinals	Semifinals	Repechage					Final	
Athlete	Event	Round of 32	Round of 16	Quarterfinals	Semifinals	Round 1	Round 2	Round 3	Round 4	Round 5	Final	
Athlete	Event	Opposition Result	Opposition Result	Opposition Result	Opposition Result	Opposition Result	Opposition Result	Opposition Result	Opposition Result	Opposition Result	Opposition Result	Rank
Filiberto Fernández	–48 kg	Bye	Vila (CUB); L 0–11	Did not advance		—N/a	Orujov (RUS); L 0–10	Did not advance				
Víctor Rodríguez	–52 kg	Yordanov (BUL); L Fall	Did not advance			Kedjaouer (ALG); L 0–2	Did not advance					
Felipe Guzmán	–74 kg	Ōta (JPN); L 0–11	Did not advance			Ritter (HUN); L 0–12	Did not advance					

== See also ==
- Mexico at the 1995 Pan American Games
