= Alberto Acosta (disambiguation) =

Alberto Acosta (born 1966) is a retired Argentinian footballer.

Alberto Acosta may also refer to:

- Alberto Acosta (diver) (born 1973), Mexican diver
- Beto Acosta (born 1977), Uruguayan footballer
- Alberto Acosta (Mexican footballer) (born 1988), Mexican footballer
