= Thomas Metzger (disambiguation) =

Thomas Metzger (1933–2025) was an American sinologist and academic.

Thomas or Tom Metzger may also refer to:

- Thomas Metzger (equestrian) (born 1959), Austrian equestrian
- Tom Metzger (1938–2020), American white supremacist
- Tom Metzger, bass of the Realtime barbershop quartet
