= Equestrian at the 2002 Asian Games – Team jumping =

Team jumping at the 2002 Asian Games
- Venue: Busan Equestrian Grounds
- Date: 11–12 October 2002
- Competitors: 36 from 9 nations

Medalists
gold medal	Japan; Tadayoshi Hayashi, Osamu Komiyama, Kenji Morimoto, Eiji Okazaki
silver medal	Philippines; Danielle Cojuangco, Mikee Cojuangco-Jaworski, Toni Leviste, Michelle Barrera
bronze medal	Malaysia; Qabil Ambak, Quzier Ambak, Syed Omar Al-Mohdzar, Syed Zain Al-Mohdzar

Team jumping equestrian at the 2002 Asian Games was held in Busan Equestrian Grounds, Busan, South Korea from October 11 to October 12, 2002.

== Schedule ==
All times are Korea Standard Time (UTC+09:00)

Date	Time	Event
Friday, 11 October 2002	10:00	1st round
Saturday, 12 October 2002	10:00	2nd round

== Results ==
Legend

- EL — Eliminated
- WD — Withdrawn

Rank	Team	Round		Total	Jump-off	
Rank	Team	1st	2nd	Total	Pen.	Time
1st place, gold medalist(s)	Japan (JPN)	0	0	0		
	Tadayoshi Hayashi on Caracas	0	0			
	Osamu Komiyama on Everett	0	0			
	Kenji Morimoto on Anderson	0	0			
	Eiji Okazaki on Warego Sandy	~~12~~	~~4~~			
2nd place, silver medalist(s)	Philippines (PHI)	4	4	8		
	Danielle Cojuangco on Ascot T	0	4			
	Mikee Cojuangco-Jaworski on Rustic Rouge	0	~~4~~			
	Toni Leviste on Nazli	4	0			
	Michelle Barrera on Coalminer	~~8~~	0			
3rd place, bronze medalist(s)	Malaysia (MAS)	3	8	11		
	Qabil Ambak on Humpfry	0	0			
	Quzier Ambak on Calano	0	4			
	Syed Omar Al-Mohdzar on O Canthus	3	4			
	Syed Zain Al-Mohdzar on Malibero	~~4~~	~~8~~			
4	South Korea (KOR)	0	12	12		
	Lee Jin-kyung on Uncle Harry	0	0			
	Kim Sung-whan on Sinchul	0	4			
	Yu Suk-jun on Glenn	0	8			
	Park Jae-hong on Watch Spot	~~16~~	~~12~~			
5	Iran (IRI)	4	15	19		
	Tara Ardalan on Air Ride	0	4			
	Ali Nilforoushan on Herr Schroder	4	4			
	Ramin Shakki on Revanche	~~4~~	7			
	Arsia Ardalan on Canterbuliry	0	~~16~~			
6	Chinese Taipei (TPE)	20	16	36		
	Chen Hui-ming on Bea	4	4			
	Chen Yi-tsung on Calimero	8	4			
	Huang Han-wen on Game Boy	8	8			
	Chiang Han-ju on Big Boy	~~12~~	~~12~~			
7	China (CHN)	20	20	40		
	Li Zhenqiang on Fa Guan	4	0			
	Meng Ke on E Le	8	8			
	Jiensi Abudubieke on Xi Xiawang	8	12			
	Liu Tongyan on Buer Gede	~~EL~~	~~EL~~			
8	Thailand (THA)	32	46	78		
	Akkara Konglapamnuay on Heatwave	4	8			
	Dhewin Manathanya on Nairobi	12	14			
	Kiatnarong Klongkarn on Chana	16	24			
	Karittipoom Kreepkrang on Western Lightning	~~EL~~	~~WD~~			
9	India (IND)	61	54	115		
	Jaspal Massih on Mast Mollah	16	8			
	Sudhir Ahlawat on Taquade	21	18			
	Sandeep Dewan on Master	24	28			
	Sajjan Kumar on Titan	~~36~~	~~48~~			
