= Peter Leone =

American equestrian

Personal information
- Born: August 1, 1960 (age 66)
Medal record
Equestrian
Representing the United States
Olympic Games
Silver medal – second place	1996 Atlanta	Team jumping

Peter Leone (born August 1, 1960) is an American equestrian. He won a silver medal in team show jumping at the 1996 Summer Olympics in Atlanta, together with Leslie Burr-Howard, Anne Kursinski and Michael R. Matz. Leone trained with many prominent horsemen including Bertlan DeNemethy, Frank Chapot, George Morris, and Michael Matz. After completing a successful junior career, Peter won the International Jumping Derby in Newport, Rhode Island, then regarded as the most challenging show jumping event in the nation. In 1982, he helped the United States finish fourth in the World Championships in Dublin, Ireland. Together with his two brothers Armand and Mark, he was named the 1984 Horseman of the Year by the New Jersey Equine Advisory Board in the United States of America.

Peter Leone, Margie Engle, and Stacia Klein Madden were the first equestrians to leverage virtual reality as a training platform in the spring of 2022.

Leone was a recipient of a USET grant to represent the U.S. on a 1997 European tour. He was a member of the winning Nations' Cup USET squad at Rotterdam and he won the Derby at Valkenswaard aboard Crown Royal “Let's Go”. Leone was one of 12 riders to contribute to the USET's win of the inaugural Samsung Nations' Cup Series in 1997. In June 1999 Leone pulled off a phenomenal double win, winning two grand prix titles over a world-class field in Germany in one weekend. In 2009 Leone rode “Candide” to win the Fairfield Grand Prix. In 2012, Leone rode “Lincourt Gino” to a third-place finish in the World Cup class at Bromont, followed by a win in the prestigious American Gold Cup, also a World Cup qualifier and one of the sport's most highly regarded titles, at North Salem.

Leone had several top placings nation-wide throughout the 2014 season on both “Wayfarer” and “My Pleasure”, including a win with “My Pleasure” in the $25,000 SmartPak Grand Prix at the HITS Summer Show.In 2015 Leone earned several top-ten placings at WEF and competed at two FEI World Cup qualifiers, placing seventh in Bromont. He and “Wayfarer” won the $30,000 Lake Placid Jumper Classic. At the Hampton Classic, Leone took 11th place aboard “Creativo” in the $15,000 Merrill Lynch Speed Derby and 16th place in the $40,000 Longines Cup with “Wayfarer.”

Leone has had a busy start to 2016, competing “Wayfarer” at WEF, the Live Oak International in Ocala, Florida and the Spring Show at Old Salem in New York. Leone is a familiar face to fans of the Hampton Classic as he is a featured broadcaster on the daily WVVH-TV Hampton Classic broadcasts.

Throughout 2016 Leone competed at some of the top shows in the nation, earning top placings on the winter circuit at WEF and Live Oak International in Ocala. He also competed at Bromont, Saugerties, and the Hampton Classic, where he took second place in the $40,000 Sovaro Speed Stake aboard “Capito Z” and ninth place in the $300,000 Hampton Classic Grand Prix with “Wayfarer.” He is a familiar face to fans as he is a featured broadcaster on the daily WVVH-TV Hampton Classic broadcasts.

At the Split Rock Jumping Tour, he and “Wayfarer” took second place in the $40,000 Amalaya Investments Grand Prix CSI3*.

Leone competed his top horses “Capito Z” and “Wayfarer” at the 2017 WEF where he earned several top-ten results with both horses. He and “Wayfarer” concluded week seven with a win in the $50,000 Grand Prix CSI 2*. He then moved on to the Old Salem Farm Spring Horse Show, where he and “Capito Z” took ninth place in the $50,000 Old Salem Farm Grand Prix CSI2*.

In 2018, Leone scored several top-ten placings at the Great Lakes Equestrian Festival (GLEF) including fourth place with “Camillo VDL” in the $35,000 Great Lakes Classic CSI3*, before heading to the Hampton Classic, where he and “Capito Z” placed 10th in the $40,000 Hampton Classic Speed Stake and took eighth place with “LS Donner” in the $30,000 Boar's Head Open Jumper Challenge.

Leone began his 2019 season with several top placings at WEF aboard a variety of horses. During the spring season, Leone took seventh place with “E-Boy W” in the $50,000 Ox Ridge Grand Prix, followed by sixth place with “Donner” in the $134,000 Mary Rena Murphy Grand Prix CSI3* at the Kentucky Spring Classic.

Peter's understanding and experience of the sport has made him an instructor, author, DVD producer, clinician, and broadcaster. His book “Peter Leone's Show Jumping Clinic: Success Strategies for Equestrian Competitors” has also been considered successful. The same goes for his training DVD, “Ride the Body: Select Insights of Peter Leone”. He is a regular broadcaster on the daily WVVH-TV Hampton Classic broadcasts.

He is the father of two children, Callie Leone and Peter Leone Jr. from his first marriage to Marcella Leone, founder and director of the LEO Zoological Conservation Center.

Leone received a Bachelor of Arts (B.A.) degree from Drew University in 1984.
