= Denise Cojuangco =

Filipino equestrian

Denise Yabut-Cojuangco
Personal information
- Nationality: Filipino
- Born: Denise Yabut; August 1, 1961 (age 65)
- Spouse: Antonio Cojuangco Jr. (sep. 1994)
- Family: Cojuangco (by marriage)

Sport
- Sport: Equestrian
- Event: Show jumping

Denise Yabut-Cojuangco (born August 1, 1961) is a Filipino equestrian. Cojuangco represented the country in show jumping in the 1992 and 1996 Summer Olympics.

== Career ==
Cojuangco participated in the Summer Olympics twice; in 1992 and 1996 Summer Olympics. She competed in the individual Show jumping in equestrian. She rode two different horses; on Nimmerdor in the 1992 Games in Barcelona and on Chouman in the 1996 edition in Atlanta. In both occasions, she failed to progress in the final round.

== Personal life ==
She is married to businessman Tonyboy Cojuangco, although they have been separated since 1994 when her estranged husband entered into a relationship with actress Gretchen Barretto.
