= LEO Zoological Conservation Center =

Defunct zoo in Connecticut, United States

Lionshare Educational Organization (LEO) Zoological Conservation Center
- Date opened: 2009
- Date closed: February 9, 2019
- Location: Greenwich and Stamford, Connecticut
- Land area: 90 to 100 acres (36 to 40 ha)
- No. of species: 50

The Lionshare Educational Organization (LEO) Zoological Conservation Center was an off-exhibit, nonprofit wildlife reserve and breeding facility in Greenwich and Stamford, Connecticut.

LEO Zoological Conservation Center was located on Lionshare Farm, a property of about 90 to 100 acres (36 to 40 ha) owned by Marcella and Peter Leone. Marcella Leone established the LEO Conservation Center in 2009 to house and breed threatened and endangered animals, particularly species at risk of extinction. The zoo announced they were closing on February 9, 2019, on their Facebook page.

== Animals ==
As of July 2015, the facility housed about 50 species, including camels, cheetahs, leopards, hyenas, giraffes, orangutans and other primates, and penguins. Unlike a traditional zoo, it was not open to the public. However, "Private Safari Tours" could be arranged for an allotted minimum donation. LEOZCC also hosted special visits for educational institutions. Conservation biologists say that breeding facilities, such as LEO, that do not exhibit animals play an important role in maintaining healthy populations of endangered animal species.

In February 2013, the center announced the birth of an eastern mountain bongo, an antelope indigenous to Kenya that is close to extinction in the wild. The following month, a Rothschild giraffe was born at the facility. Photos and video of the baby giraffe, which belongs to a very endangered subspecies of giraffe, attracted extensive media attention. The center announced a public contest to choose a name for the baby; in response, over 6,000 suggestions were submitted on the center's website. The winning name, Sandy Hope, was announced on the NBC Today show on April 1, 2013.

=== Births ===
Adaeze and Odie - Adaeze, meaning "daughter of a king", is one of eight cubs born to Mona Lisa, the only king cheetah in North and South America. King cheetah are extremely rare, and approximately only 30 remain in the wild. Recorded as the largest litter ever birthed, LEOZCC keepers realized the mother could not successfully raise all eight cubs, and three were removed to be hand raised, two of which will be going back to Africa for reintroduction to spread their rare and diverse genes back into the wild. Adaeze was raised alongside companion animal, Odie, an Australian Shepard, to become an "Animal Ambassador" for educational outreach and to spread the word on cheetah conservation. The duo has travelled to many events including the Museum of Natural History Annual Family Party, Lion Country Safari in Florida, and the Today Show on NBC.

Artie the Orangutan - In the spring of 2014 baby Artie was born, the first ever orangutan born through artificial reproductive technology, at LEO. This completed the first step of their Wild Cycling program, a term coined by founder and director Marcella Leone, which aims for the expansion of genes both in and out of zoological institutions and wild populations. The goal of the Wild Cycling program is to preserve, as well as increase genetic diversity within the species in order to promote a viable future Orangutan population.

Rothschild's Giraffe - With fewer than 700 individuals left in the wild, LEOZCC has welcomed several births for this endangered species. The first Rothschild giraffe was born to the center in 2013, followed by a media contest for its naming. The giraffe was named Sandy Hope in dedication to the tragic 2012 elementary school shooting in Sandy Hook, CT.

Giant Anteater - In 2013, two giant anteaters were born. As male anteaters are known to commit infanticide (parental killing of a newborn), the father was removed from the enclosure right before the birth of the first baby. A few months later, keepers entered the enclosure and discovered two offspring. The gestation period of a giant anteater is around six months, meaning dam and sire had not been reunited for long enough to get pregnant and have another baby. While how the dam got pregnant again remains a mystery, speculations of through the fence breeding or the first recorded instance of delayed implantation in the species have been listed as possible conception methods.

Fennec Fox & The Hound - In 2011 a litter of four North African fennec foxes was born at the center. The vixen was unable to care for or nurse the newborns so LEOZCC found introduced a surrogate mother. Momma, a lactating American foxhound, was located at a North Carolina kill-center by LEOZCC and Adopt-a-Dog and taken to the center to care for the newborn foxes.

== Education ==
LEOZCC partnered with several local educational institutions in order to promote conservation learning and efforts. Through these partnerships, students of all ages were able to interact up-close and personal with some of the world's rarest species.

The center was also able to bring their "Animal Ambassadors" to outreach events such as school assemblies, the Maritime Aquarium, American Museum of Natural History member events, Mount Sinai hospital, the Woman's Club of Greenwich and other zoological institutions.
