= Miguel Leal (equestrian) =

Portuguese equestrian (1961–2021)

Personal information
- Full name: António Miguel Santa Marta de Faria Leal
- Nationality: Portuguese
- Born: 10 March 1961; Lisbon, Portugal
- Died: 26 October 2021 (aged 60)

Sport
- Sport: Equestrian

António Miguel Santa Marta de Faria Leal (10 March 1961 – 26 October 2021) was a Portuguese equestrian. He competed in the individual jumping event at the 1996 Summer Olympics.
