= Alexander Earle =

Puerto Rican equestrian

Personal information
- Nationality: Puerto Rican
- Born: 12 February 1977 (age 48)

Sport
- Sport: Equestrian

Alexander Earle (born 12 February 1977) is a Puerto Rican equestrian. He competed in the individual jumping event at the 1996 Summer Olympics.
