= Alejandro Davila =

Colombian equestrian

Personal information
- Full name: Alejandro Davila McAllister
- Nationality: Colombian
- Born: 13 October 1972 (age 52)

Sport
- Sport: Equestrian

Alejandro Davila McAllister (Note: In this Spanish name, the first or paternal surname is Davila and the second or maternal family name is McAllister.) (born 13 October 1972) is a Colombian equestrian. He competed in the individual jumping event at the 1996 Summer Olympics.
