= Alejandro Jordá =

Spanish equestrian

Personal information
- Full name: Alejandro Jordá Candelas
- Nationality: Spanish
- Born: 19 August 1955 (age 69); Barcelona, Spain

Sport
- Sport: Equestrian

Alejandro Jordá Candelas (Note: In this Spanish name, the first or paternal surname is Jordá and the second or maternal family name is Candelas.) (born 19 August 1955) is a Spanish equestrian. He competed in two events at the 1996 Summer Olympics.
