= Cosequin =

Nutritional supplement for animals

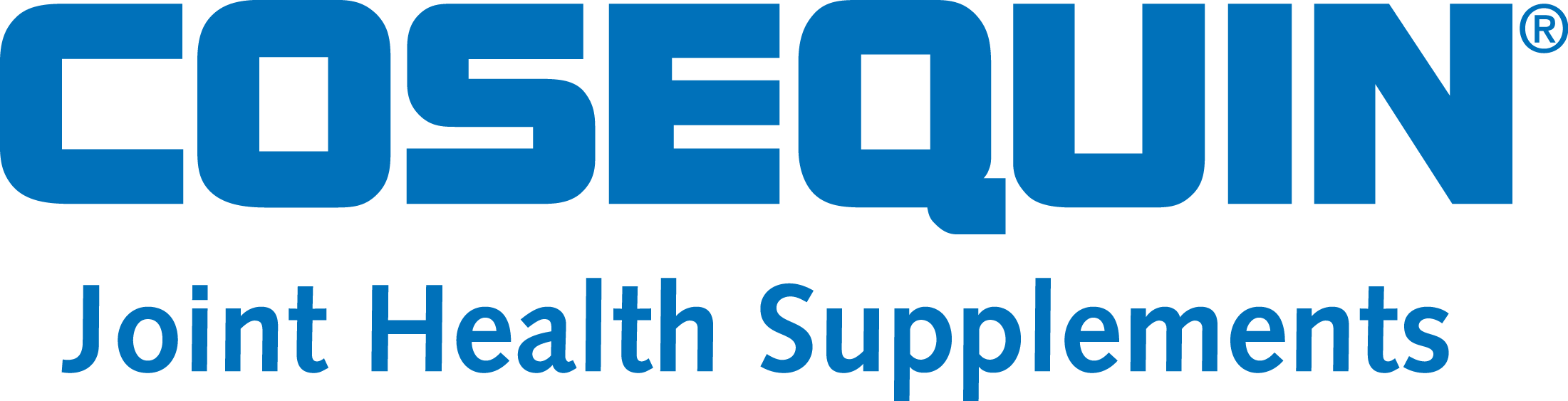
Cosequin Logo

Cosequin is a dietary supplement for animals. It claims to support joint health in pets.

Cosequin is manufactured in the by Nutramax Laboratories Veterinary Sciences, Inc. It contains TRH122(R) chondroitin sulfate, FCHG49(R) glucosamine, and manganese ascorbate. Cosequin comes in formulas specific for cats, dogs and horses. Newer products for horses include ASU (avocado/soybean unsaponifiables).

According to the manufacturer, Cosequin may be useful for pets with osteoarthritis, but the efficacy is disputed. Glucosamine is used in equine medicine, but little evidence indicates that it has any value in the treatment of joint disease in horses. A randomized controlled trial by Michigan State University published in 2026 showed 6 weeks of Cosequin ASU supplementation had "no beneficial treatment effects" on lameness in 40 geldings with osteoarthritis.

Since glucosamine can aid in the production of glycosaminoglycans, which are parts of the protective layer of the urinary tract, it has been used in cats suffering from lower urinary tract disease (FLUTD). However, efficacy has not been definitively demonstrated.
