= Natale Chiaudani =

Italian equestrian (born 1960)

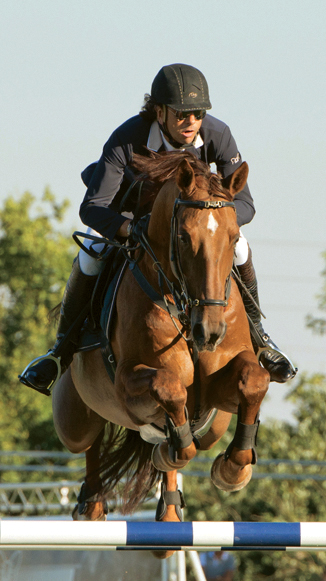
- Natale Chiaudani in 2012

Personal information
- Nationality: Italian
- Born: 13 September 1960 (age 65) Tortona, Italy

Sport
- Sport: Equestrian
Medal record
Equestrian
Representing Italy
Mediterranean Games
Gold medal – first place	2005 Almería	Team jumping
Silver medal – second place	1997 Bari	Individual jumping
Silver medal – second place	1997 Bari	Team jumping

Natale Chiaudani (born 13 September 1960) is an Italian former equestrian. He competed in two events at the 1996 Summer Olympics.
