= Damian Gardiner =

Irish equestrian

Personal information
- Nationality: Irish
- Born: 23 September 1968
- Died: 10 September 2013 (aged 44)

Sport
- Sport: Equestrian

Damian Gardiner (23 September 1968 – 10 September 2013) was an Irish equestrian. He competed in two events at the 1996 Summer Olympics. Gardiner died of esophageal cancer, aged 44.
