= Helmut Morbitzer =

Austrian equestrian

Personal information
- Nationality: Austrian
- Born: 25 September 1955 (age 70) Klaus an der Pyhrnbahn, Austria

Sport
- Sport: Equestrian

Helmut Morbitzer (born 25 September 1955) is an Austrian former equestrian. He competed in two events at the 1996 Summer Olympics.
