= Christopher Delia =

Canadian equestrian

Personal information
- Nationality: Canadian
- Born: 27 December 1971 (age 53)

Sport
- Sport: Equestrian

Christopher Delia (born 27 December 1971) is a Canadian equestrian. He competed in two events at the 1996 Summer Olympics.
