= Arnaldo Bologni =

Italian equestrian (born 1960)

Personal information
- Nationality: Italian
- Born: 23 August 1960 (age 65)

Sport
- Sport: Equestrian
Medal record
Equestrian
Representing Italy
Mediterranean Games
Silver medal – second place	1993 Languedoc-Roussillon	Team jumping
Silver medal – second place	1997 Bari	Team jumping
Bronze medal – third place	1993 Languedoc-Roussillon	Individual jumping

Arnaldo Bologni (born 23 August 1960) is an Italian equestrian. He competed in two events at the 1996 Summer Olympics.

== Early life ==
Arnaldo Bologni was born on 23 August 1960 in Reggio nell’Emilia, Italy.

He developed an interest in horseback riding and show jumping at a young age and went on to build a long and successful career in the sport.
