= Emile Hendrix =

Dutch equestrian

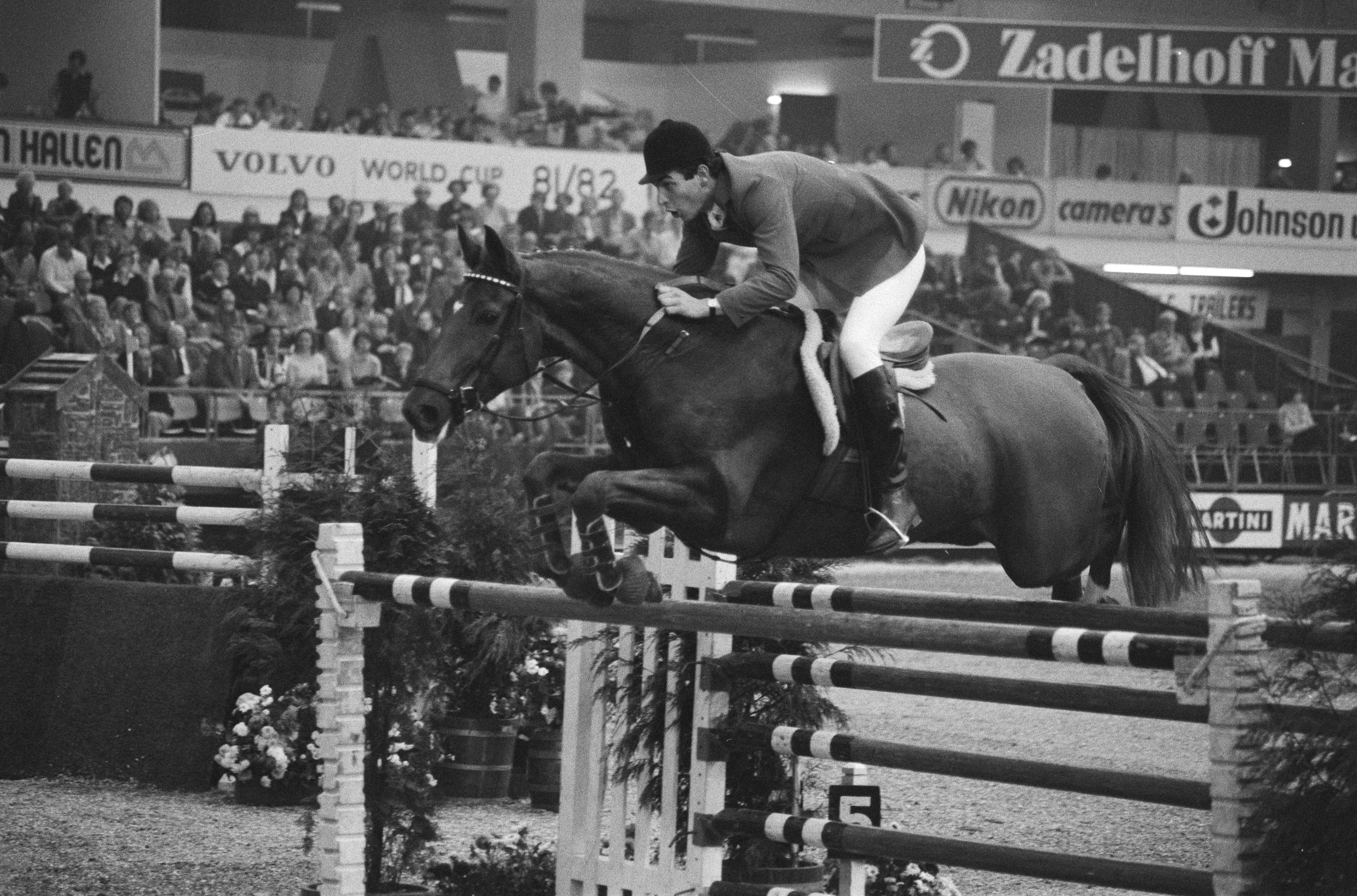
- Emile Hendrix in 1981

Personal information
- Nationality: Dutch
- Born: 5 December 1955 (age 70) Heel, Netherlands

Sport
- Sport: Equestrian

Emile Hendrix (born 5 December 1955) is a Dutch equestrian. He competed in two equestrian events at the 1996 Summer Olympics.
