= Linda Southern-Heathcott =

Canadian equestrian

Personal information
- Born: 3 January 1963 (age 62) Calgary, Alberta, Canada

Sport
- Sport: Equestrian

Linda Southern-Heathcott (born 3 January 1963) is a Canadian equestrian. She competed in two events at the 1996 Summer Olympics.
