= Michel Blaton =

Belgian equestrian

Personal information
- Nationality: Belgian
- Born: 23 April 1967 (age 59) Ixelles, Belgium

Sport
- Sport: Equestrian

Achievements and titles
- Olympic finals: 1996 Summer Olympics

Michel Blaton (born 23 April 1967) is a Belgian former equestrian. He competed in two events at the 1996 Summer Olympics.
