= Oscar Fuentes =

Argentine equestrian

Personal information
- Nationality: Argentine
- Born: 10 July 1954 (age 72)

Sport
- Sport: Equestrian

Oscar Fuentes (born 10 July 1954) is an Argentine equestrian. He competed in two events at the 1996 Summer Olympics.
