= Urs Fäh =

Swiss equestrian

Personal information
- Nationality: Swiss
- Born: 15 April 1964 (age 60)

Sport
- Sport: Equestrian

Urs Fäh (born 15 April 1964) is a Swiss equestrian. He competed in two events at the 1996 Summer Olympics.
