= Federico Castaing =

Argentine equestrian

Personal information
- Nationality: Argentine
- Born: 28 May 1960 (age 66)

Sport
- Sport: Equestrian
Medal record
Equestrian
Representing Argentina
Pan American Games
Silver medal – second place	1995 Mar del Plata	Individual eventing

Federico Castaing (born 28 May 1960) is an Argentine equestrian. He competed in two events at the 1996 Summer Olympics.
