= Kenji Morimoto =

Japanese equestrian

Personal information
- Nationality: Japanese
- Born: 14 December 1975 (age 50)

Sport
- Sport: Equestrian
Medal record
Equestrian
Representing Japan
Asian Games
Gold medal – first place	2002 Busan	Team jumping

Kenji Morimoto (born 14 December 1975) is a Japanese equestrian. He competed in two events at the 1996 Summer Olympics.
