= Bert Romp =

Dutch equestrian

Personal information
- Born: Berend Romp; 4 November 1958 Veendam, Netherlands
- Died: 4 October 2018 (aged 59) Tilburg, Netherlands
- Cause of death: Horse accident
Medal record
Equestrian
Representing the Netherlands
Olympic Games
Gold medal – first place	1992 Barcelona	Show jumping, team

Berend "Bert" Romp (4 November 1958 – 4 October 2018) was a Dutch equestrian and Olympic champion in the sport. He won a gold medal in show jumping with the Dutch team at the 1992 Summer Olympics in Barcelona.

Romp died on 4 October 2018, at age 59, after a horse kicked him.
