= Franke Sloothaak =

German equestrian

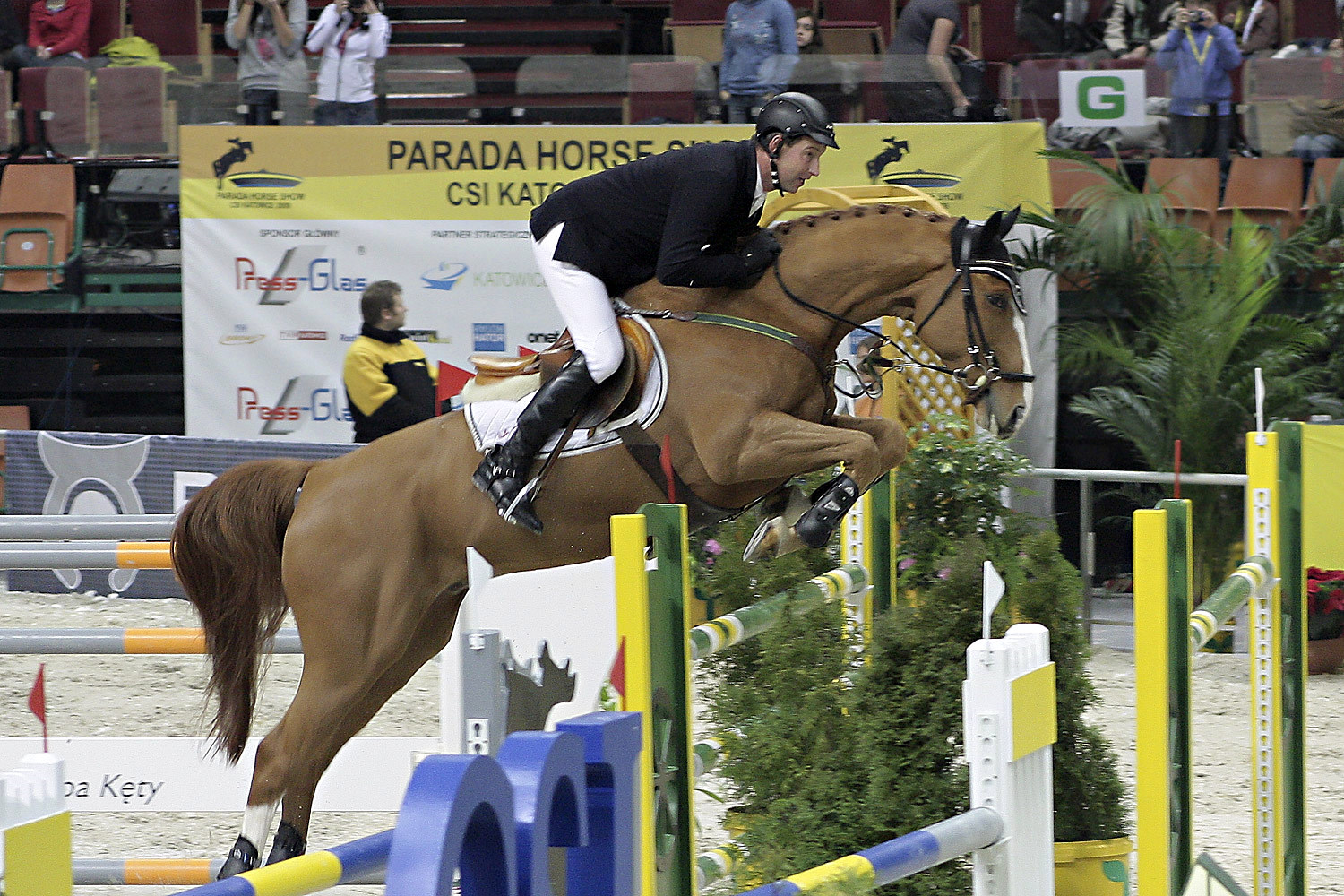
- Franke Sloothaak

Medal record

Equestrian

Representing West Germany

Olympic Games
Gold medal – first place	1988 Seoul	Team jumping
Bronze medal – third place	1984 Los Angeles	Team jumping

Representing Germany

Olympic Games
Gold medal – first place	1996 Atlanta	Team jumping

Franke Sloothaak (born 2 February 1958 in Heerenveen, the Netherlands) is a German show jumping champion, Olympic champion from 1988 and 1996.

== Olympic record ==
Sloothaak competed for West Germany at the 1984 Summer Olympics in Los Angeles, where he received a bronze medal in team jumping with Farmer, and at the 1988 Summer Olympics in Seoul, where the team received a gold medal.

He participated for Germany at the 1996 Summer Olympics in Atlanta, where he won a gold medal in Team Jumping, together with Lars Nieberg, Ulrich Kirchhoff and Ludger Beerbaum.

Sloothaak still holds the world record for the indoor Puissance. In June 1991, Sloothaak jumped a record-breaking 2.40 m (7 ft 10 in) in Chaudfontaine, Belgium on the horse Optiebeurs Golo.
