= Valerio Sozzi =

Italian equestrian

Personal information
- Nationality: Italian
- Born: 6 December 1968 (age 56); Gorla Minore, Italy

Sport
- Sport: Equestrian

Valerio Sozzi (born 6 December 1968) is an Italian equestrian. He competed at the 1992 Summer Olympics and the 1996 Summer Olympics.
