= Pedro Sánchez (equestrian) =

Spanish equestrian

Personal information
- Nationality: Spanish
- Born: 22 February 1966 (age 59); Murcia, Spain

Sport
- Sport: Equestrian

Pedro Sánchez (born 22 February 1966) is a Spanish equestrian. He competed at the 1988 Summer Olympics and the 1996 Summer Olympics.
