= Alexandra Ledermann =

French equesterian

Medal record

Equestrian

Representing France

Olympic Games
| Bronze medal – third place | 1996 Atlanta | Show jumping |

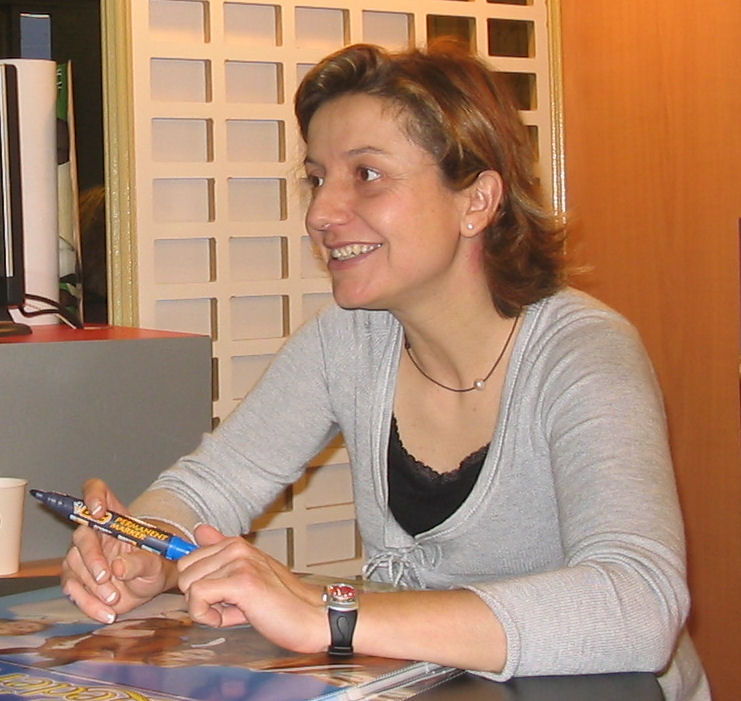
Alexandra Ledermann

Alexandra Ledermann (born 14 May 1969) is a French equestrian and Olympic medalist. She won a bronze medal in show jumping at the 1996 Summer Olympics in Atlanta.

Ledermann was born in Évreux in 1969. In 1999, she became the first woman to win gold at the European Show Jumping Championships. As of 2019, Ledermann and Meredith Michaels-Beerbaum of Germany were the only two women to have won this title.

Ledermann lends her name to a series of equestrian-themed video games.
