= Rolf-Göran Bengtsson =

Swedish show jumper

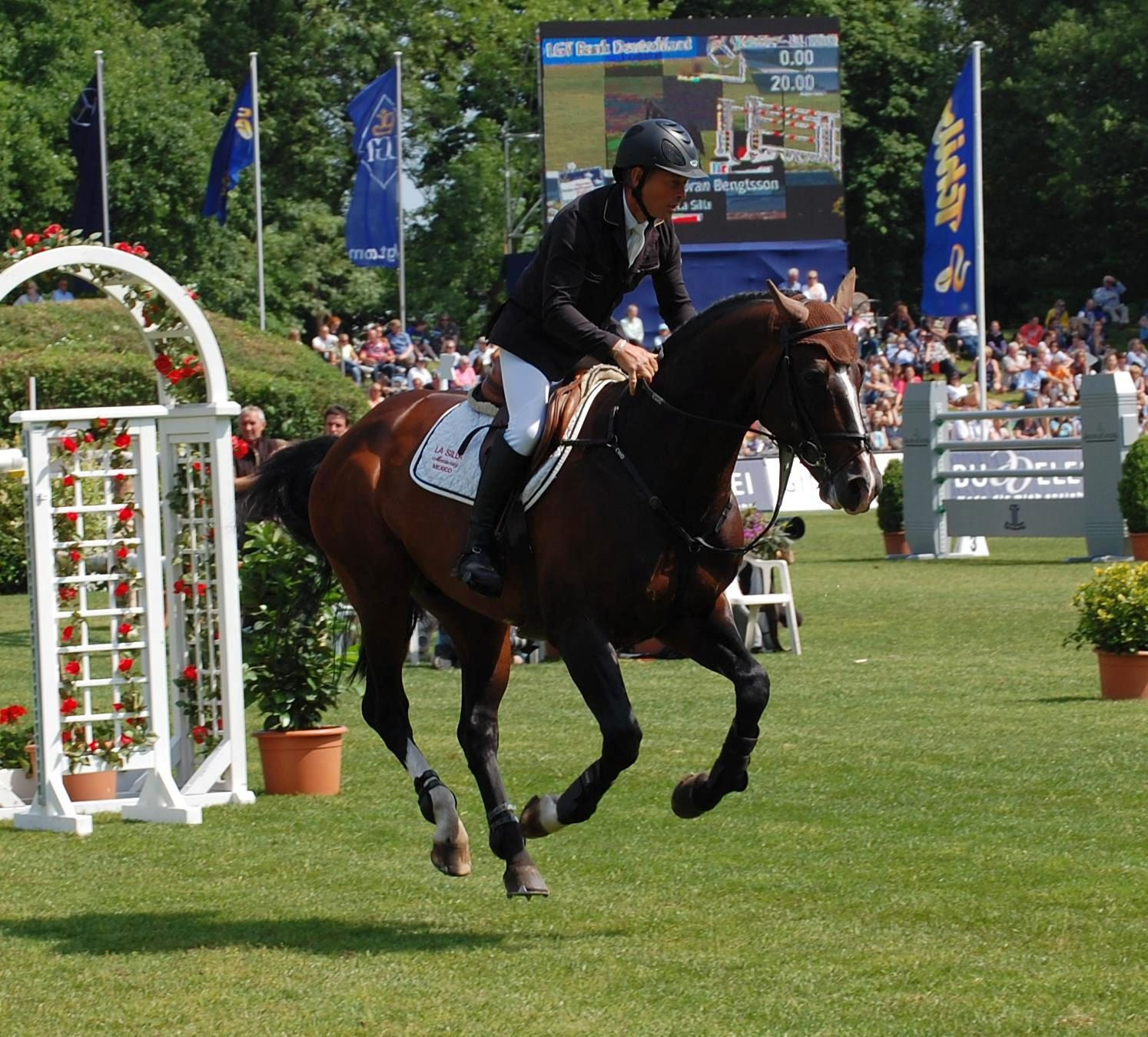
- Rolf-Göran Bengtsson on Casall

Medal record

Equestrian

Representing Sweden

Olympic Games
Silver medal – second place	2004 Athens	Team jumping
Silver medal – second place	2008 Beijing	Individual jumping

European Show Jumping Championships
Gold medal – first place	2011 Madrid	Individual jumping
Gold medal – first place	2023 Milan	Team jumping
Silver medal – second place	2001 Arnheim	Team jumping
Bronze medal – third place	2001 Arnheim	Individual jumping
Bronze medal – third place	2013 Herning	Team jumping

Rolf-Göran Bengtsson (born 2 June 1962 in Lund) is a Swedish show jumper. He won a silver medal in the 2008 Summer Olympics in the individual jumping, and also a silver medal in the team jumping event at the 2004 Summer Olympics. In 2011, Bengtsson won the Jerring Award.

From 1997 to 2003 he worked at the stable of Jan Tops in Valkenswaard. Since 2003 Bengtsson lives in Breitenburg in Northern Germany where he runs his own stable together with Bo Kristoffersen.

The Mexican billionaire Alfonso Romo is a major financier to Bengtsson's ventures into the world of international show jumping.

Olympic Games
Preceded by Christian Olsson	Flagbearer for Sweden; London 2012	Succeeded by Therese Alshammar
