= Jerry Smit =

Italian equestrian

Personal information
- Nationality: Italian
- Born: 22 September 1969 (age 55); Milan, Italy

Sport
- Sport: Equestrian

Jerry Smit (born 22 September 1969) is an Italian equestrian. He competed at the 1992 Summer Olympics, the 1996 Summer Olympics and the 2000 Summer Olympics.
