= Eric Wauters =

Belgian equestrian

Medal record

Equestrian

Representing Belgium

Olympic Games
Bronze medal – third place	1976 Montreal	Team jumping

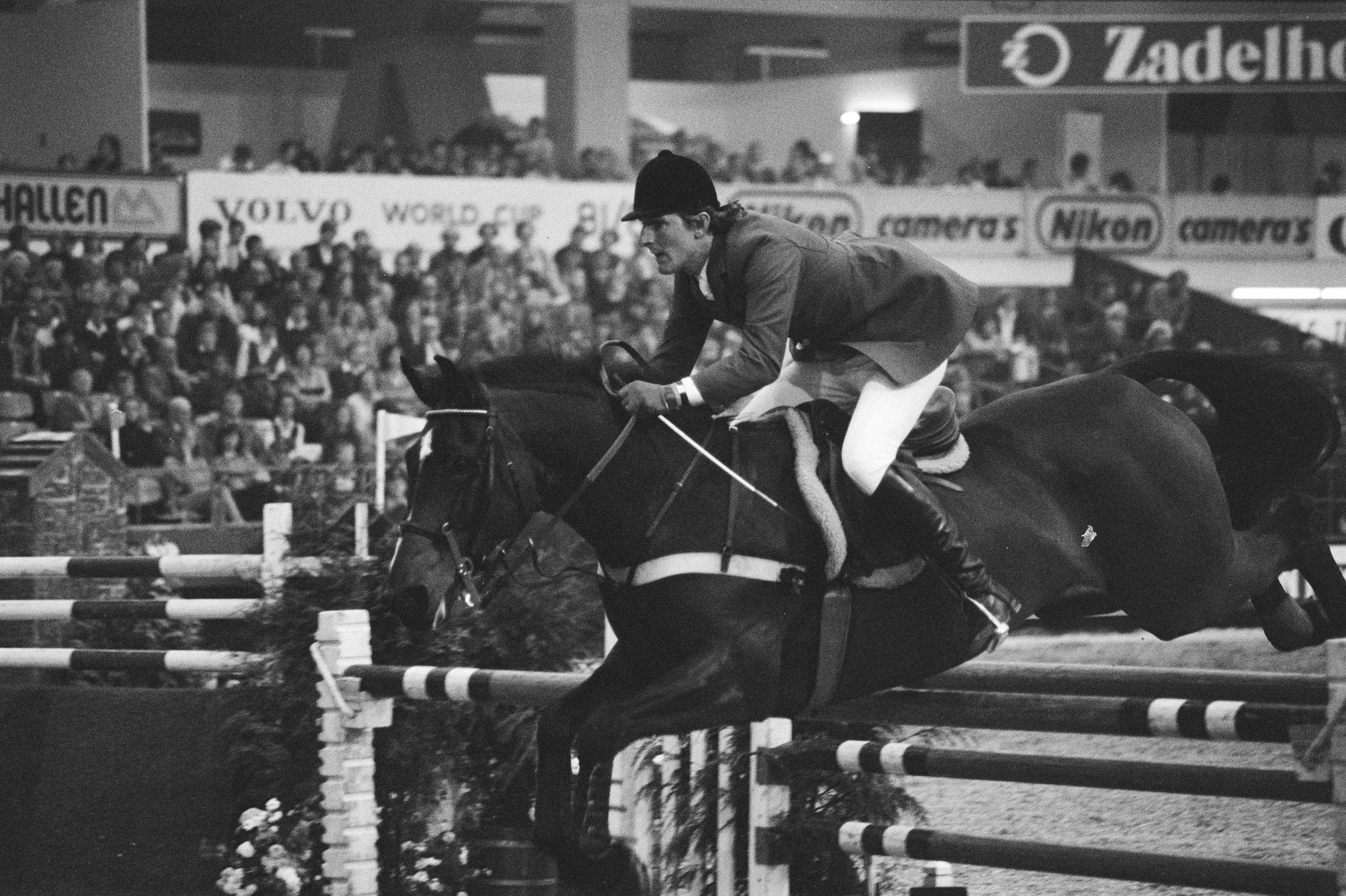
Eric Wauters in 1981

Eric Wauters (12 May 1951 – 21 October 1999) was a Belgian equestrian and Olympic medalist. He competed in show jumping at the 1976 Summer Olympics in Montreal, and won a bronze medal with the Belgian team. He also competed in the 1972 and 1996 Olympics.

== Personal life ==
He was born in Antwerp in 1951. Wauter's daughter Caroline married the German Olympic medalist Daniel Deusser. They had a daughter together in 2015.

Wauters died in his home in 1999 at the age of 48. The cause of death was suicide. There is an annual horse show named in memory of him.
