= Justo Albarracín =

Argentine equestrian

Personal information
- Nationality: Argentine
- Born: 18 May 1951 (age 73)

Sport
- Sport: Equestrian

Justo Albarracín (born 18 May 1951) is an Argentine equestrian. He competed at the 1984 Summer Olympics and the 1996 Summer Olympics.
