= Alberto Acosta (diver) =

Mexican diver (born 1973)

Personal information
- Nationality: Mexican
- Born: 8 April 1973 (age 53)

Sport
- Sport: Diving
Medal record
Representing Mexico
Pan American Games
Silver medal – second place	1995 Mar del Plata	10m platform

Alberto Enrique Acosta Palma (born 8 April 1973) is a Mexican diver. He competed in the 1992 and 1996 Summer Olympics.
