= José Madariaga =

Mexican equestrian

Personal information
- Nationality: Mexican
- Born: 23 May 1968 (age 56)

Sport
- Sport: Equestrian

José Madariaga (born 23 May 1968) is a Mexican equestrian. He competed in two events at the 1996 Summer Olympics.
