= Lars Nieberg =

German equestrian

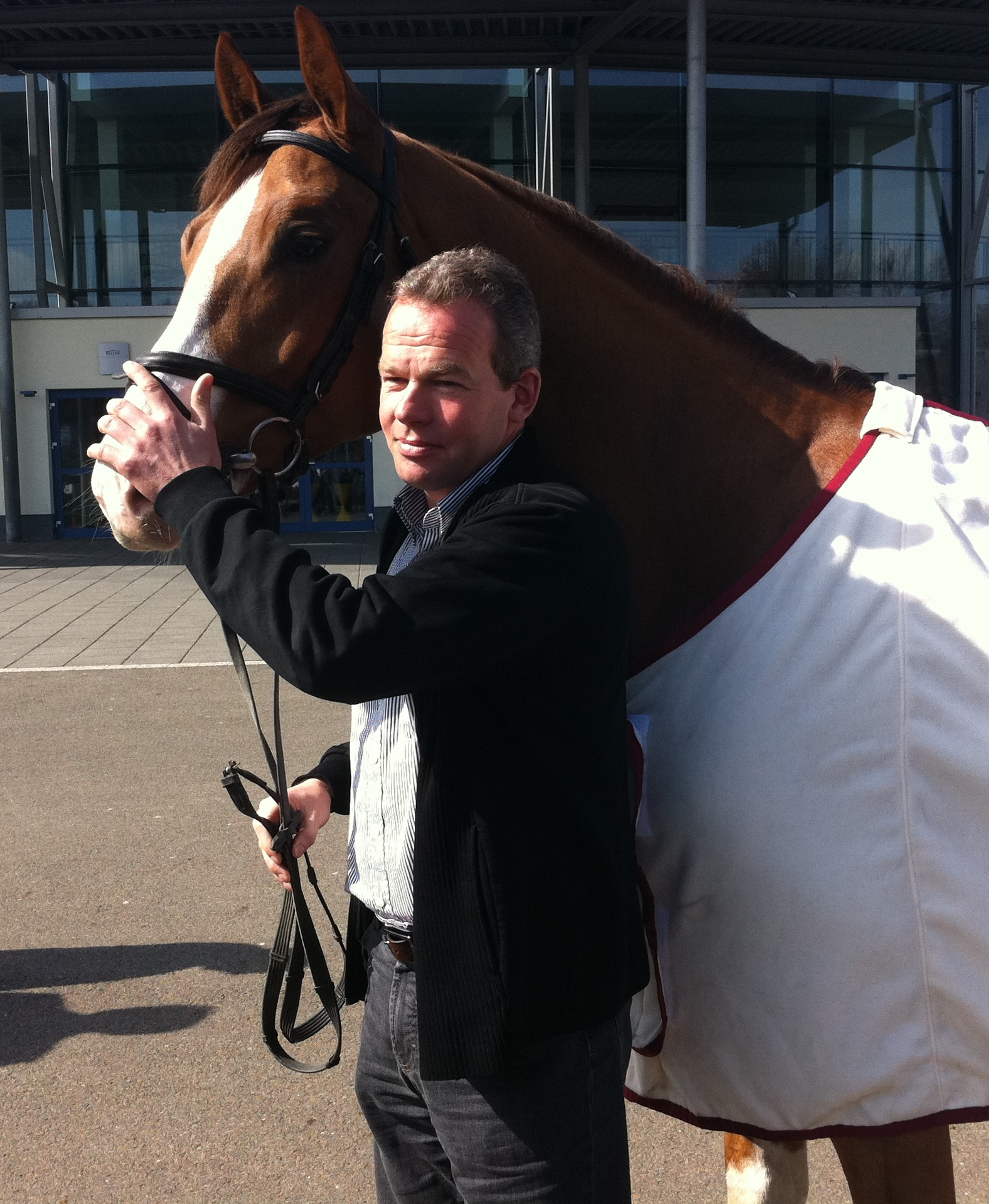

Medal record

Representing Germany

Men's equestrian

Olympic Games
Gold medal – first place	1996 Atlanta	Team jumping
Gold medal – first place	2000 Sydney	Team jumping

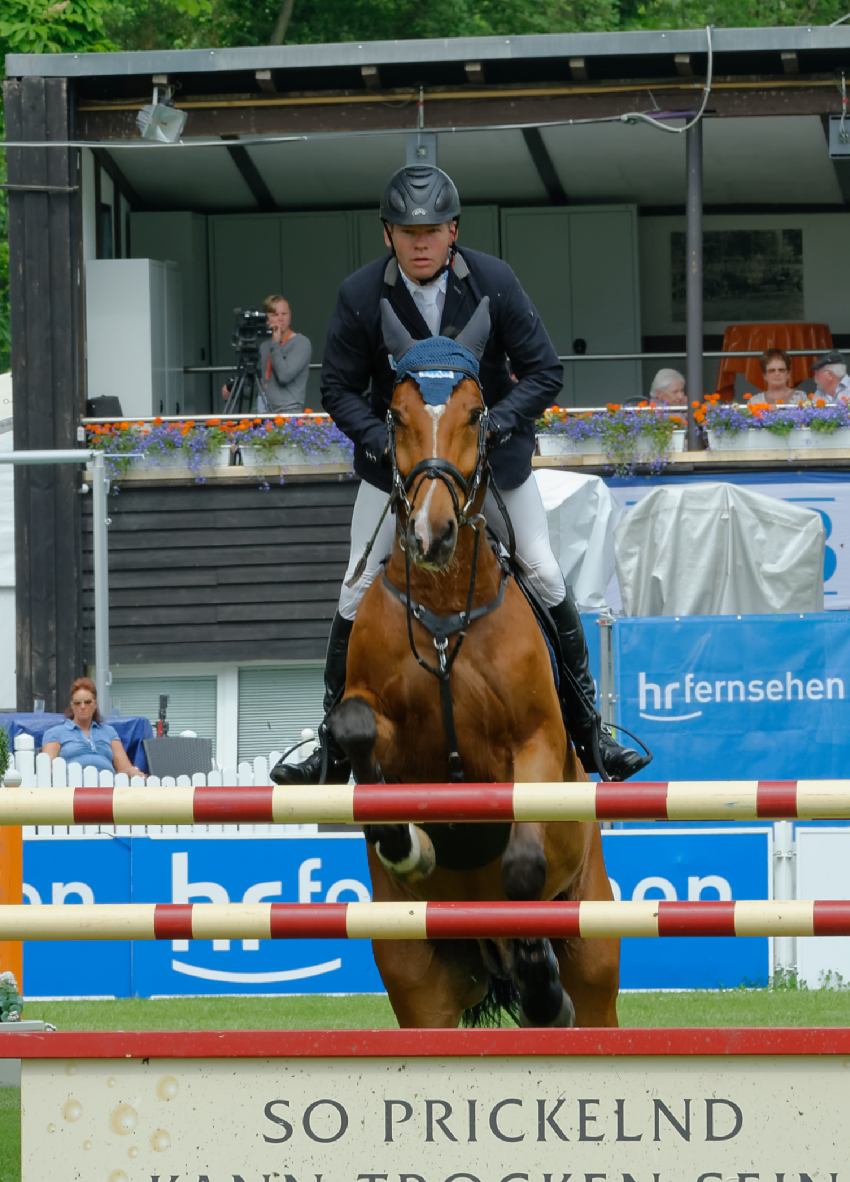
Lars Nieberg with Chactus 2 at CSIYH* in Wiesbaden 2015

Lars Nieberg (born 24 July 1963 in Wittingen, Lower Saxony) is a German equestrian. He participated in the 1996 and 2000 Olympics in show jumping competition.

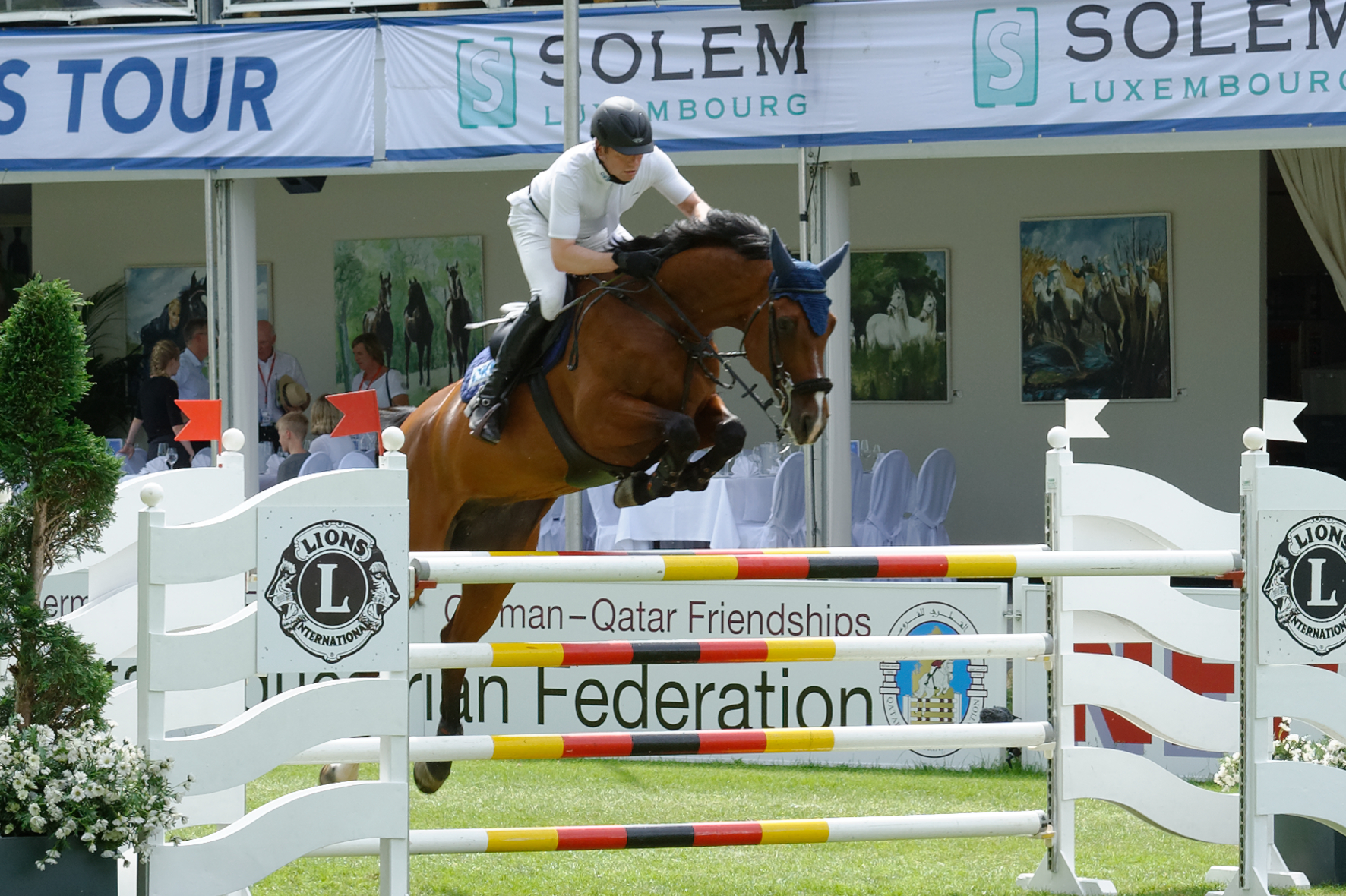
2014 at Wiesbaden

== Olympic record ==
Nigberg participated at the 1996 Summer Olympics in Atlanta, where he won a gold medal in Team Jumping, together with Franke Sloothaak, Ulrich Kirchhoff and Ludger Beerbaum.

Nieberg again won a gold medal in Team Jumping at the 2000 Summer Olympics in Sydney, together with Marcus Ehning, Otto Becker and Ludger Beerbaum.
