= Anton-Martin Bauer =

Austrian equestrian (born 1963)

Personal information
- Nationality: Austrian
- Born: 10 September 1963 (age 61); Unterpremstätten, Austria

Sport
- Sport: Equestrian

Anton-Martin Bauer (born 10 September 1963) is an Austrian former equestrian. He competed at the 1996 Summer Olympics and the 2000 Summer Olympics.
