= Stanny Van Paesschen =

Belgian equestrian

Medal record

Equestrian

Representing Belgium

Olympic Games
Bronze medal – third place	1976 Montreal	Team jumping

World Championships
Bronze medal – third place	2002 Jerez	Team jumping

Stanny Van Paesschen (born 24 April 1957) is a Belgian equestrian and Olympic medalist. He was born in Antwerp. He competed in show jumping at the 1976 Summer Olympics in Montreal, and won a bronze medal with the Belgian team.
