= Thomas Metzger (equestrian) =

Austrian equestrian

Personal information
- Nationality: Austrian
- Born: 26 February 1959 (age 66); Vienna, Austria

Sport
- Sport: Equestrian

Thomas Metzger (born 26 February 1959) is an Austrian equestrian. He competed in two events at the 1996 Summer Olympics.
