= Ulrich Kirchhoff =

German equestrian

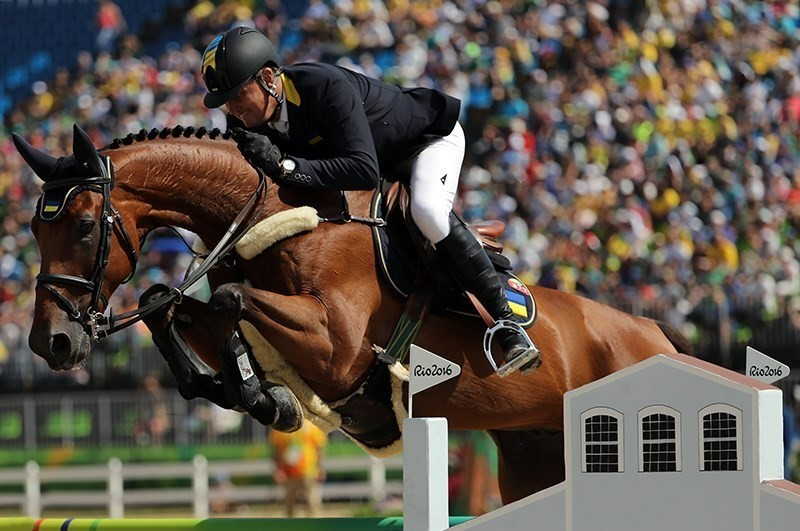
- Ulrich Kirchhoff and Prince de la Mare at the 2016 Summer Olympics

Personal information
- Born: 9 August 1967 (age 58) Lohne, West Germany

Sport
- Sport: Equestrian
Medal record
Representing Germany
Men's equestrian
Olympic Games
Gold medal – first place	1996 Atlanta	Individual jumping
Gold medal – first place	1996 Atlanta	Team jumping

Ulrich Kirchhoff (born 9 August 1967 in Lohne) is a German (until 2013) and Ukrainian show jumping rider, Olympic champion from 1996.

== Olympic record ==
Kirchhoff participated at the 1996 Summer Olympics in Atlanta, where he won a gold medal on the stallion Jus De Pommes in the Individual Jumping. At the same Olympics he also received a gold medal in Team jumping, together with Franke Sloothaak, Lars Nieberg and Ludger Beerbaum.
