= Georgia International Horse Park =

Equestrian venue in Conyers, Georgia

Coordinates: 33°39′41″N 83°55′57″W

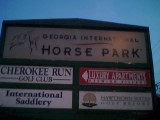
Entrance sign to the park.

The Georgia International Horse Park (referred to by locals as The Horse Park) is located in Conyers, Georgia, United States, 30 miles (50 km) east of Atlanta.

== History ==
Due to the growth of Rockdale County, Georgia, in the late 1980s, the county was looking to expand its wastewater treatment system, but they were having to find alternative uses to strict environmental regulations on the local, state, and federal levels. The City of Conyers, Georgia, found 1,139 acres (4.61 km^{2}) of land on Georgia State Route 138 north of Interstate 20 that would have been suitable for land application.

Both the City Manager and the County Council were in the process of finding other uses for this land other than land application when Atlanta was awarded the 1996 Summer Olympics on September 18, 1990. This led to a change in plans from a city park to the development of the land that would later become the Georgia International Horse Park. As a result, an equestrian task force was developed to have the park developed, under cooperation with the Atlanta Committee for the Olympic Games (ACOG).

The proposed site was visited on August 7, 1991, with details about the land, the proposed facilities, and their post-Olympic usage. The Georgia International Horse Park became reality when it was approved by ACOG on October 21, 1991.

Some of the outdoor scenes for the Netflix series Stranger Things were filmed in the park.

== The Centennial Olympic Games ==
During the 1996 Summer Olympics, which ran from July 19 to August 4, over 600,000 people visited the track to witness events in equestrian, mountain biking, and the riding and running portions of the modern pentathlon events.

Among the event competitors who would gain fame ten years later were Kateřina Neumannová and Michael R. Matz. Neumannová competed in the women's mountain biking competition at the 1996 Summer Olympics would later win the gold medal at the 2006 Winter Olympics in the women's 30 km freestyle mass start cross country skiing event. Matz earned a silver in Team show jumping event, and as a trainer, has two wins in Triple Crown of Thoroughbred Racing events and a Breeder's Cup win.

== Post–Olympics Legacy ==
After the 1996 Summer Olympics, the area around the Georgia International Horse Park experienced growth surrounding the facility. This growth including several residential developments, the movement of First Baptist Church of Conyers from downtown Conyers in late 2000, and the horse park has become a multi-use facility hosting public events such as horse shows, festivals, fairs, dog shows, trade shows, concerts, obstacle course races and mountain bike events. The venue also offers facilities for private social events, such as weddings, receptions, showers, birthday parties and more.

=== Concert venue ===
The venue hosted several concerts over the years, primarily utilizing the main horse park arena and bleacher seating.

==== The Allman Brothers Concert (1997) ====
The facility hosted several high-profile concerts in the years following the Olympics. The first was a performance by the Allman Brothers Band on July 4, 1997. The legendary Southern rock band played a lengthy 21 song set, that was followed by an Independence Day fireworks show.

==== 99X Big Day Out ====
Atlanta Alternative rock music radio station 99X produced two editions of their Big Day Out radio festival concerts at the Horse Park. The September 28, 1997, show featured Foo Fighters, The Offspring, Goldfinger, The Mighty Mighty Bosstones, Cowboy Mouth, Ear 2000, Local H, Me First and the Gimme Gimmes, Squirrel Nut Zippers, Kingsized, Ziggy Marley and the Melody Makers, DownPour, and Memory Dean. The September 12, 1998, edition featured Big Bad Voodoo Daddy, Better Than Ezra, Goo Goo Dolls, Semisonic, Fuel, Fastball, K's Choice, Atheneum, Everything, Addict, Urge, Guster, Amazing Royal Crowns, Shawn Mullins, Jump, Little Children, Albert Hill, The Marvelous 3, Shock Lobo, Blacklight Posterboys, Wil's Drama, Another Man Down, and Seven Foot Politic.

==== Celebrate Freedom Atlanta 2007 ====
On September 1, 2007, the park played host to the Celebrate Freedom 2007 concert, including evangelist Luis Palau. Among the sponsors were Ford Motor Company, Bugaboo Creek Steak House, and WFSH-FM in Atlanta. The event was televised by the Gospel Music Channel. Included were kid activities which also featured the VeggieTales, including The Pirates Who Don't Do Anything: A VeggieTales Movie.

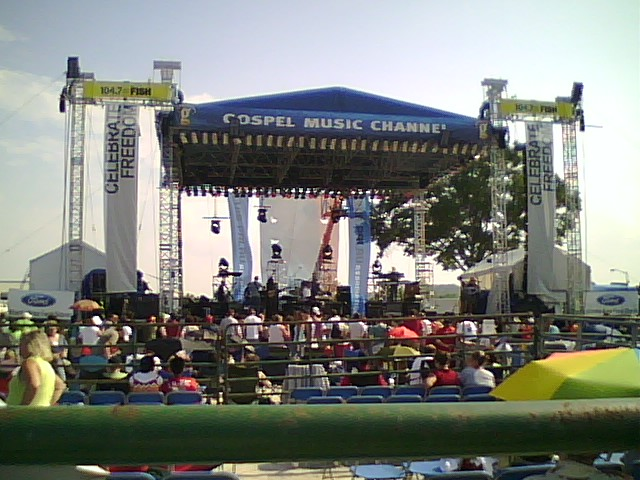
Celebrate Freedom 2007 main stage.

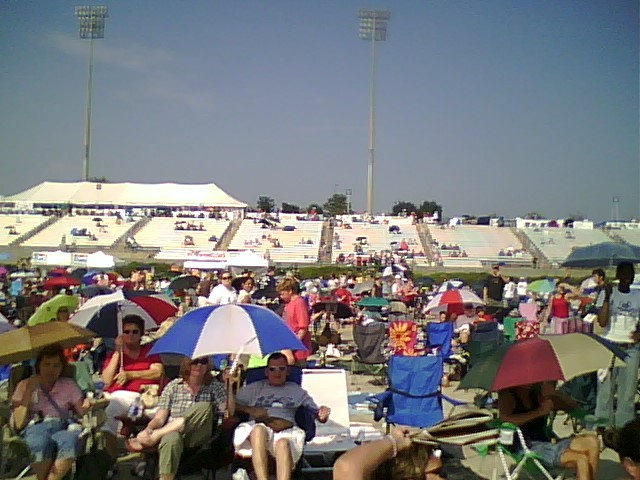
A view from the main stage of the park in the late afternoon of the event.

The VeggieTales characters (left to right) of Mr. Lunt, Pa Grape, and Larry the Cucumber on the main stage dressed up in costume for the film The Pirates Who Don't Do Anything: A VeggieTales Movie which was released on January 11, 2008.

==== Celebrate Freedom Atlanta 2008 ====
On August 30, 2008, the park hosted the Celebrate Freedom 2008 concert. Training involved for field ministers took place on the evening of August 27, 2008 at the First Baptist Church, located 2 miles (3 km) south of the park.

==== Sporting Events ====
The Georgia International Horse Park is not only the home of many equine events throughout the year, but hosts a number of outdoor sporting events. The Georgia International Horse Park's trail system offers scenic trails for mountain bike races, trail races and obstacle course races. The Horse Park has hosted Spartan Race, Ragnar Trail Atlanta, BattleFrog, Rugged Maniac, Muddy Princess, Green Goblin, and Down and Dirty Obstacle Course Race over the years.

== Georgia Perimeter College ==
Georgia Perimeter College planned on constructing a facility nearby by 2008, but negotiations between the city of Conyers and Georgia Perimeter College building a facility failed. The college instead constructed a facility in neighboring Newton County, Georgia.
