= Alfonso Romo =

Mexican businessman

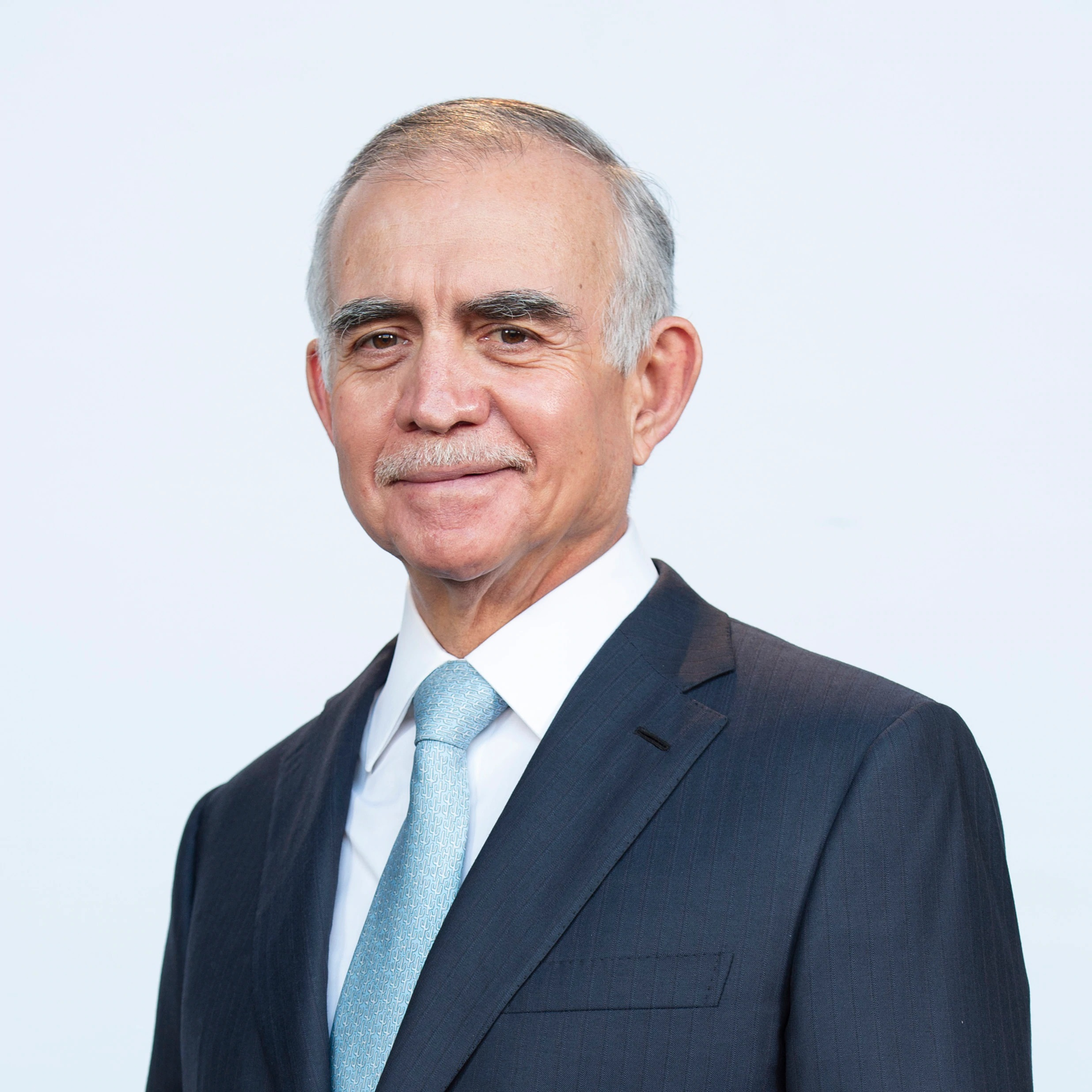

Chief of Staff to the President of México
- In office 1 December 2018 – 2 December 2020
- President: Andrés Manuel López Obrador
- Preceded by: Francisco Guzmán Ortiz
- Succeeded by: Lázaro Cárdenas Batel

Personal details
- Born: Alfonso Carlos Romo Garza; 8 October 1950 (age 75)
- Occupation: Businessman

Alfonso Carlos Romo Garza (born 8 October 1950), known as Alfonso Romo, is a Monterrey businessman, agro-industrialist. He founded the Opción Ciudadana (Citizen Option) party in 2005. He is the owner of VECTOR Casa de Bolsa, the largest fund management company in Latin America.

Alfonso Romo was born in Mexico City, Mexico, and attended the Instituto Patria, a grammar, middle and high school then still run by the Society of Jesus (Jesuits). He then graduated from the Institute Tecnologico y de Estudios Superiores de Monterrey, where he received a degree in agricultural engineering.

He founded Pulsar International in 1981. A holding company that among other entities included an insurance company, and stock brokerage. The group later expanded into biotechnology and seed production. Apart from its business enterprises, Pulsar supports various cultural, educational and ecological activities. His seed production company was known as Seminis before being sold to Monsanto.

Alfonso Romo was active in support of former Mexican President Vicente Fox, and a leading proponent of the regional development and integration scheme known as the Puebla-Panama Plan. In 2012, however, he has decided to give his support to the Morena presidential candidate Andrés Manuel López Obrador. He is a member of the World Bank's External Advisory Board for Latin America and the Caribbean.

Romo is a major financier to the Swedish show jumper Rolf-Göran Bengtsson's ventures into the world elite of show jumping. Romo has competed as an equestrian at the 1996 Summer Olympics and the 2000 Summer Olympics.

== See also ==
- DNA Plant Technology
- Seminis
