= Antonio Chedraui =

Mexican equestrian

Personal information
- Full name: Jose Antonio Chedraui Eguia
- Born: 10 June 1966 (age 59); Xalapa, Mexico

Sport
- Sport: Equestrian

Jose Antonio Chedraui Eguia (born 10 June 1966) is a Mexican equestrian. He competed at the 1996 Summer Olympics and the 2008 Summer Olympics.
