= Leslie Burr Howard =

American equestrian (born 1956)

Leslie Michele Burr-Howard
Personal information
- Born: October 1, 1956 (age 69) Westport, Connecticut, U.S.
- Occupation: Equestrian
- Height: 5 ft 6 in (168 cm)

Sport
- Country: United States
Medal record
Equestrian
Representing the United States
Olympic Games
Gold medal – first place	1984 Los Angeles	Team jumping
Silver medal – second place	1996 Atlanta	Team jumping
Pan American Games
Silver medal – second place	1983 Caracas	Team jumping
Silver medal – second place	1999 Winnipeg	Team jumping

Leslie Burr-Howard (born October 1, 1956) is an American equestrian and an Olympic champion in showjumping. She won team gold at the 1984 Los Angeles Olympics and team silver at the 1996 Atlanta Olympics, as well as team silver at the 1999 Winnipeg Pan American Games.

== Early life ==
Leslie Burr-Howard was born Leslie Michele Burr on October 1, 1956, in Westport, Connecticut.

She competed in her first show when she was 6 years old. She won the 1972 ASPCA Maclay Finals as a junior rider.

== Career ==
She won a gold medal in show jumping with the American team at the 1984 Summer Olympics in Los Angeles riding Albany, and a silver medal in 1996 aboard the Dutch warmblood mare Extreme.

Burr-Howard is also well known as the second of the three primary riders for the legendary showjumper Gem Twist. She helped the horse earn the AGA Horse of the Year title, which was for a third time, and was a record. In 1994, she represented the United States in the Netherlands for the FEI World Equestrian Games. She also rode Charisma and Gem Twist in the United States Equestrian Team (USET) Show Jumping Championship at the Bayer/USET Festival of Champions in Gladstone, New Jersey, to tie for first place.

There were 12 riders who contributed to the USET's win in the 1997 inaugural Samsung Nations' Cup Series, which culminated at Spruce Meadows, Calgary, in Canada. Burr-Howard was one of the 12 riders. Burr-Howard won the richest Grand Prix event, the $1 Million CN International Grand Prix (formerly known as the du Maurier Limited International Grand Prix).

In 1999, in Winnipeg, Manitoba, Canada, Burr-Howard assisted USET in winning the team silver medal at the Pan American Games.

In 2000, Burr-Howard competed in the USA East Coast World Cup League and come out on top. She also competed in the United States Equestrian Team Region 1 Show Jumping Championship, winning for a second consecutive time. She competed at the Royal Horse Show in Toronto, Canada and earned the Leading Rider award.

=== Honors ===
- 1983 American Grandprix Association Rider of the Year
- 1986 American Horse Show Association Equestrian of the Year
- 1997 Whitney Stone Cup by USET
- 2018 Pennsylvania National Horse Show Hall of Fame

== Personal ==
Burr-Howard currently splits her time between Newtown, Connecticut and Wellington, Florida.
