= Jaime Guerra =

Mexican equestrian (born 1963)

Personal information
- Nationality: Mexican
- Born: 20 January 1963 (age 63)

Sport
- Sport: Equestrian
Medal record
Equestrian
Representing Mexico
Pan American Games
Bronze medal – third place	1987 Indianapolis	Team jumping

Jaime Guerra (born 20 January 1963) is a Mexican equestrian. He competed at the 1992 Summer Olympics and the 1996 Summer Olympics.
