= Equestrian events at the 1996 Summer Olympics =

Equestrian at the Games of the XXVI Olympiad
- Venue: Georgia International Horse Park
- Dates: 23 July – 4 August 1996
- No. of events: 6
- Competitors: 219 from 30 nations

The Equestrian events were held at the Georgia International Horse Park in Conyers, United States, 30 miles or 50 km east of Atlanta. For the first time in Olympic history, the three-day event individual and team events were held as two separate competitions. A rider could compete in both events. This format would continue to the 2000 Olympics.

== Medal summary ==
Event	Gold	Silver	Bronze
Individual dressage	Isabell Werth and Gigolo; Germany	Anky van Grunsven and Bonfire; Netherlands	Sven Rothenberger and Weyden; Netherlands
Team dressage	Germany; Klaus Balkenhol and Goldstern; Martin Schaudt and Durgo; Monica Theodorescu and Grunox; Isabell Werth and Gigolo	Netherlands; Tineke Bartels and Barbria; Anky van Grunsven and Bonfire; Sven Rothenberger and Weyden; Gonnelien Rothenberger and Gonnelien	United States; Robert Dover and Metallic; Michelle Gibson and Peron; Steffen Peters and Udon; Guenter Seidel and Graf George
Individual eventing	Blyth Tait and Ready Teddy; New Zealand	Sally Clark and Squirrel Hill; New Zealand	Kerry Millikin and Out and About; United States
Team eventing	Australia; Wendy Schaeffer and Sunburst; Gillian Rolton and Peppermint Grove; Andrew Hoy and Darien Powers; Phillip Dutton and True Blue Girdwood	United States; Karen O'Connor and Biko; David O'Connor and Giltedge; Bruce Davidson and Heyday; Jill Henneberg and Nirvana	New Zealand; Blyth Tait and Chesterfield; Andrew Nicholson and Jaggermeister II; Vaughn Jefferis and Bounce; Victoria Latta and Broadcast News
Individual jumping	Ulrich Kirchhoff and Jus De Pommes; Germany	Wilhelm Melliger and Calvaro V Switzerland	Alexandra Ledermann and Rochet M France
Team jumping	Germany; Franke Sloothaak and Joly Coeur; Lars Nieberg and For Pleasure; Ulrich Kirchhoff and Jus De Pommes; Ludger Beerbaum and Ratina Z	United States; Peter Leone and Legato; Leslie Burr-Howard and Extreme; Anne Kursinski and Eros; Michael R. Matz and Rhum	Brazil; Luiz Felipe de Azevedo and Cassiana; Álvaro de Miranda Neto and Aspen; André Johannpeter and Calei; Rodrigo Pessoa and Tomboy

== Medal table ==
Rank	Nation	Gold	Silver	Bronze	Total
1	Germany	4	0	0	4
2	New Zealand	1	1	1	3
3	Australia	1	0	0	1
4	United States	0	2	2	4
5	Netherlands	0	2	1	3
6	Switzerland	0	1	0	1
7	Brazil	0	0	1	1
7	France	0	0	1	1
Totals (8 entries)		6	6	6	18

== Officials ==
Appointment of officials was as follows:

Dressage

- (United States) Linda Zang (Ground Jury President)
- (Germany) Uwe Mechlem (Ground Jury Member)
- (Netherlands) Jan Peeters (Ground Jury Member)
- (France) Bernard Maurel (Ground Jury Member)
- (Sweden) Eric Lette (Ground Jury Member)

Jumping

- (United States) John Ammermann (Ground Jury President)
- (Spain) José Alvarez de Bohorques (Ground Jury Member)
- (Austria) Franz Pranter (Ground Jury Member)
- (Belgium) Francis Michielsen (Ground Jury Member)
- (United States) Linda Allen (Course Designer)
- (Germany) Olaf Petersen (Technical Delegate)

Eventing

- (Italy) Giovanni Grignolo (Ground Jury President)
- (United States) Jack Le Goff (Ground Jury Member)
- (Republic of Ireland) Patrick Carew (Ground Jury Member)
- (Germany) Bernd Springorum (Ground Jury Member)
- (United States) Roger Haller (Course Designer)
- (United Kingdom) Hugh Thomas (Technical Delegate)
