= Markus Liebherr =

German-born Swiss businessman

- Born: 30 March 1948; Kirchdorf an der Iller, Württemberg, Germany
- Died: 10 August 2010 (aged 62)
- Citizenship: Switzerland
- Occupation(s): Entrepreneur and Engineer
- Known for: Owner of Mali International AG; Owner of Southampton FC
- Children: 1

Markus Liebherr (30 March 1948 – 10 August 2010) was a German-born Swiss businessman and a member of one of Europe's top family business dynasties. He was a Swiss entrepreneur and owner of MALI International AG, which he founded in 1994.

== Early life ==
He was born one of five children and was the son of Hans Liebherr, who started the company Liebherr, one of the world's leading manufacturers of construction machinery, set up over 60 years ago in Germany.

Markus Liebherr studied mechanical engineering and had an increased interest in special agricultural vehicles.

== Career ==
He was given equal shares in the German holding company in the 1980s when the business moved its management headquarters to Switzerland, with his siblings Hubert, Willi and Isolde. He later handed most of his shares back to his family, and ran his own group of companies, the Mali Group, from 1994 until his death. He founded the company in Heinrichsburg near Eberhardzell in the district of Biberach in Upper Swabia.

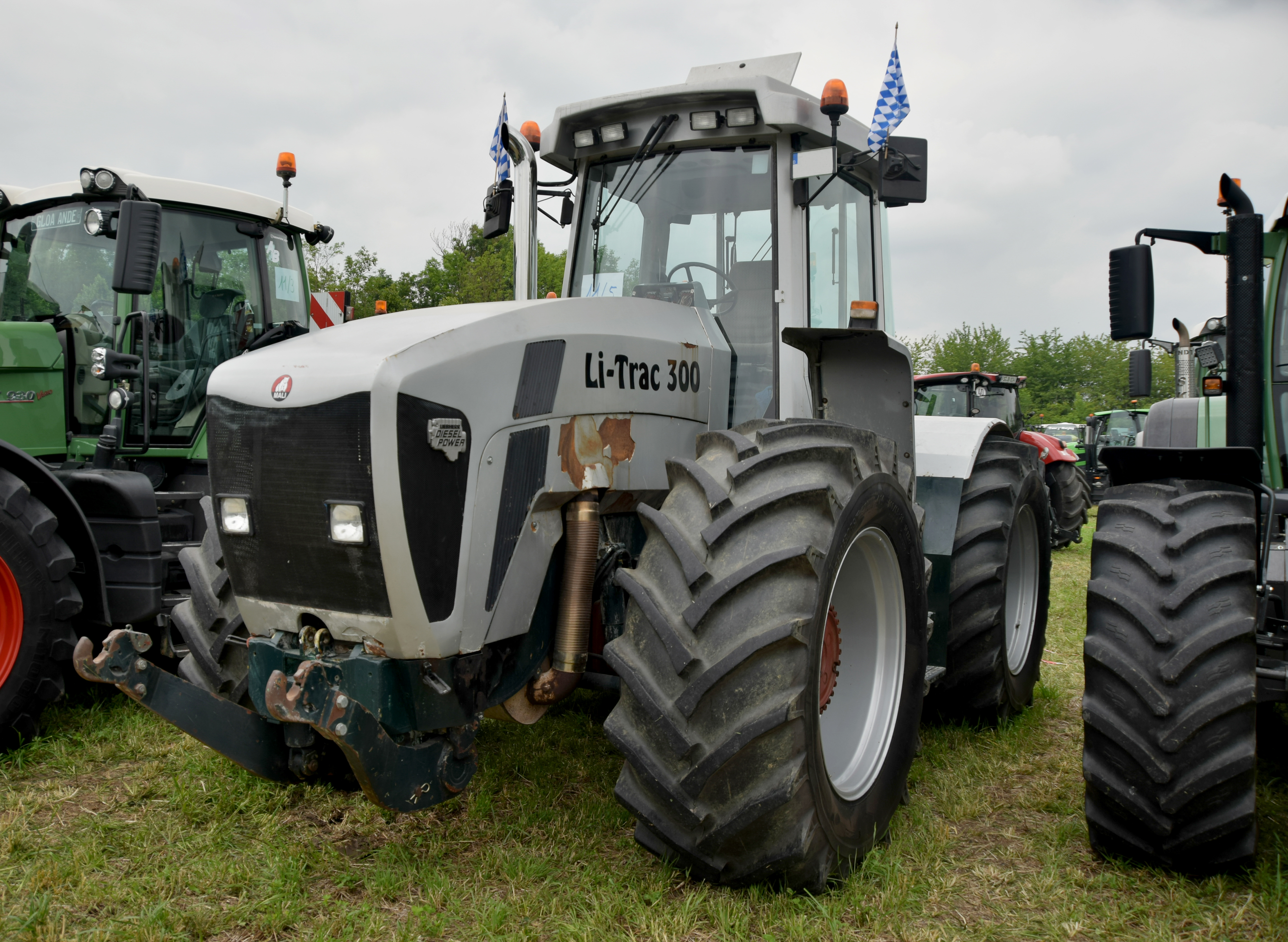
Mali Li-Trac 300 tractor

After the Bavarian tractor manufacturer Anton Schlüter München ceased production in the early 1990s, Mali developed an unofficial successor. Liebherr had previously equipped some Schlüter tractors with Liebherr engines. Only a few prototypes of the two models of the Mali trac with 250 and 300 hp were built, although the concept with suspended front axle, 50 km/h top speed, large cab with rotating operator's platform and removable power lift and hydraulic block was groundbreaking. However, the company was not satisfied with the tried-and-tested transmissions, so the project was initially put on hold.

=== MALI International AG ===
The MALI Group focuses on the development and market launch of products for the off-road sector. For these vehicles it develops transmission technology, injection technology, development, vehicle construction, control technology. The company's end customers are forestry companies, municipalities, road maintenance services, farmers or even the emergency management with all its equipment carrier vehicles.

The Mali group contains five independent businesses, all belonging to the MALI Markus Liebherr International group whose head offices are in Fribourg, Switzerland.

- One of the companies is CRT Common Rail Technologies AG based in Beringen, Switzerland – a business concerning the ‘research and design of common rail systems’.
- Another of his companies is Mali Motan AG, also based in Beringen and concerning the ‘manufacturing and sales of CVT transmissions and common rail systems."
- A third company is the German-based BSG Bodensee Steuergeräte – its primary business being the ‘research, design, manufacturing and sales of electronic control units for common rail injection and transmissions."
- MALI Spezialfahrzeuge GmbH based in Eberhardzell, Germany, concerns ‘research and design transmission technology.’
- MALI Spezialfahrzeugbau GmbH, based in Elbe, Germany, deals with ‘research, design, manufacture and sale’ of offroad vehicles.

At Agritechnica 2009, the world's largest trade fair for agricultural machinery, Mali presented its trac-140 system carrier for municipal applications. Also on display from Kirowez importer L&K (Land- und Kraftfahrzeugtechnik Stadtilm) was a 400-hp articulated tractor equipped with Mali's WSG-250 continuously variable transmission. MALI Spezialfahrzeuge GmbH in Schönebeck filed for insolvency in 2012.

== Southampton Football Club ==
On 8 July 2009, 98 days after Southampton Leisure Holdings PLC, Southampton's former holding company, had been placed in administration under Begbies Traynor, Liebherr's bid to buy the club was successfully completed. The total amount he had paid has not been disclosed but it is believed to be around £13–15 million.

In the first year of Liebherr's ownership, Southampton overcame a ten-point deduction for going into administration to mount a late challenge for the play-offs, missing out by seven points. On 28 March 2010, Southampton won the Football League Trophy at Wembley Stadium.

Following his death in August 2010, the club was inherited by his daughter Katharina Liebherr. Since then, Southampton achieved back-to-back promotions to the Premier League and solidified themselves in that division for 11 years before being relegated in 2023.

In 2017, Katharina Liebherr sold an 80% stake in the club for GBP210 million to Chinese Lander Sports Investment company owned by the Gao family.

== Death ==
Liebherr died of a heart attack, on 10 August 2010. He reached the age of 62 years.
