= Isolde Liebherr =

German Billionaire Businesswoman

Isolde Mathilde Liebherr
- Born: 10 July 1949 (age 77); Memmingen, West Germany
- Education: Mannheim Business School (M.B.A., 1975)
- Occupation: Member of the administrative board Liebherr Group
- Spouse: Married
- Children: Three daughters

Isolde Mathilde Liebherr (born 10 July 1949 in Memmingen, West Germany) is a German-Swiss billionaire entrepreneur, current member and former chairman of the board of Liebherr Group.

== Life and education ==
Born in Memmingen, Isolde Liebherr grew up in the Upper Swabian village of Kirchdorf and Biberach as the fourth of five children of company founder Hans Liebherr. After graduating high school, she completed a degree in economics and achieved the academic degree Diplom-Kauffrau.

She is the mother of three daughters and lives in Bulle, Switzerland.

== Career ==
After earning her management degree in 1976, she joined her father's company. In the mid-seventies, she took over the services division within the Liebherr Group and was responsible for the hotels and other properties of the company. These include the Interalpen-Hotel Tyrol in Telfs, the Löwen-Hotel Schruns and the hotel The Dunloe in Killarney. In her birthplace Memmingen, the Liebherr Group runs the Hotel Falken. The Bilderberg Conference was held in Telfer Interalpen Hotel in 1988 and 2015.

After the death of her father in 1993 and the renunciation of her brothers Hans, Hubert and Markus, she took over the corporation in the legal form of a stock company, together with Willi Liebherr. The only shareholders are family members of the Liebherr family. Isolde Liebherr was vice president of the administrative board of Liebherr-International AG until 2023, when Stéfanie Wohlfahrt became the new vice president. Isolde Liebherr remained a member of the administrative board.

== Honors and awards ==
- Ambassador of the Peace Bell of the Alpine Area, 2001
- Honorary Doctorate from the National University of Ireland at Cork, 2012
- Honorary citizenship of Kirchdorf, 2022

== Wealth ==
On the 2018 Forbes list, Isolde and Willi Liebherr ranked 222nd, with approximately US$7.1 billion. The Liebherr family's assets were estimated at 9.3 billion in 2023 by Bilanz, placing them 19th on a list of the 300 richest people in Switzerland.

== Sponsoring ==
Isolde Liebherr is financially involved in horse show jumping. In 1997, she bought Tinka's Boy and made him available to former Swiss world class equestrian Markus Fuchs. Tinka's Boy would become his most successful horse. Her niece, Christina Liebherr, won the bronze medal at the 2008 Olympic Games with the Swiss show jumping team.
