= Liebherr LR series =

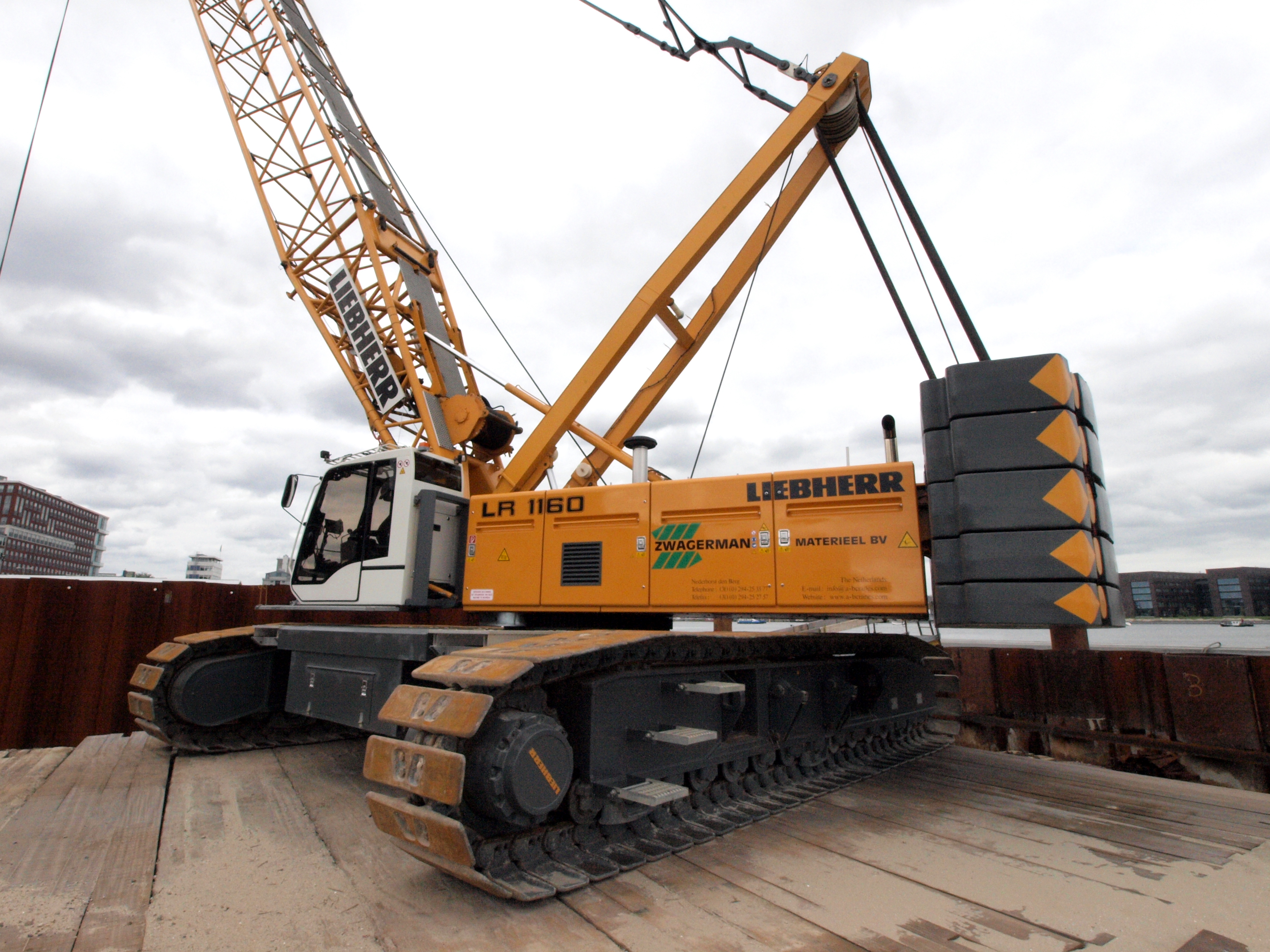
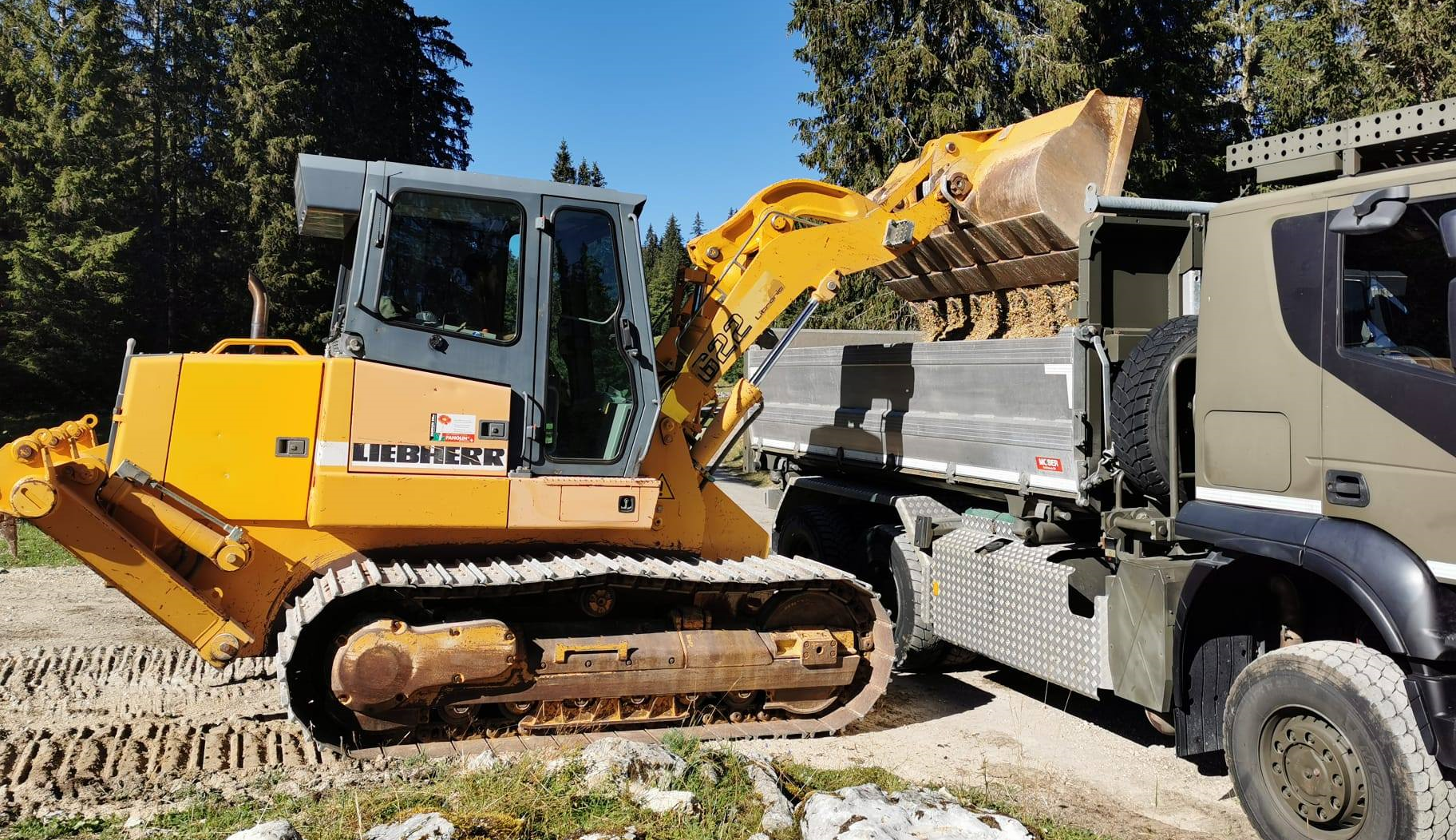
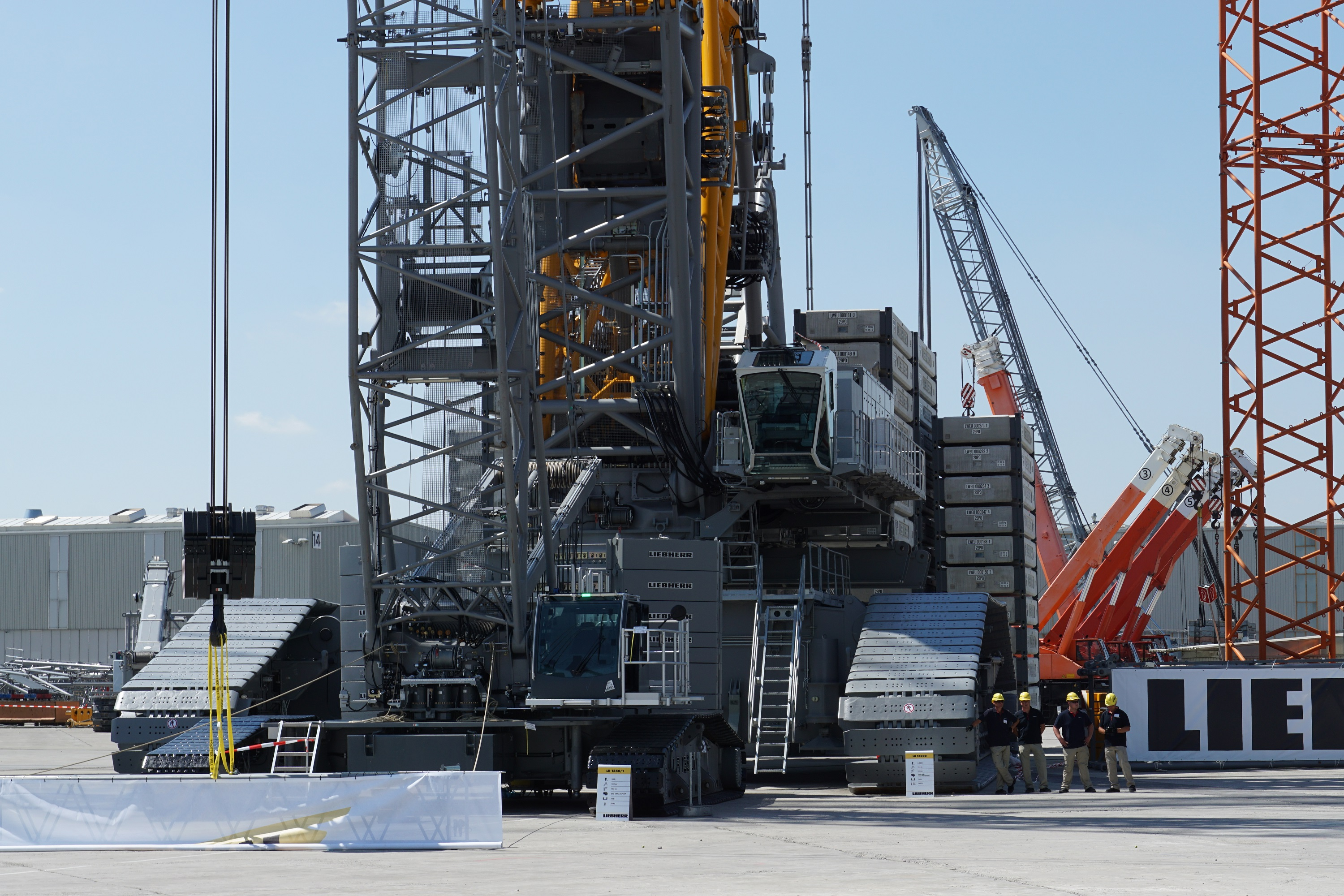
- Liebherr LR crawler crane

Overview
- Manufacturer: Liebherr-Werk Ehingen GmbH
- Production: 1978 – present
- Assembly: Ehingen, Germany

Powertrain
- Transmission: hydrostatic

The Liebherr LR series are crawler cranes designed and manufactured in Germany by Liebherr-Werk Ehingen GmbH, a subsidiary of the Liebherr Group.

A model in the LR series, the LR 13000 is known for being the tallest and most powerful conventional crawler crane in the world.

== History ==
Production and sales of Liebherr crawler cranes began when TVA in the USA purchased two LR 1300Vs. In 1978, Liebherr Ehingen delivered its first two crawler cranes.

The first LR 13000 was purchased by Mammoet in 2012.

== Design and engineering ==
LR crawler cranes are mounted on tracked undercarriages, providing high stability and ground pressure distribution, as well as the ability to travel with suspended loads within defined limits. Depending on model and configuration, the cranes support a variety of boom systems, including main boom, luffing jib, derrick boom, and fixed jib combinations.

The LR 13000 is capable of lifting 3,000 tonnes (2,953 long tons; 3,307 short tons) and has a maximum pulley height of 248 metres (814 ft). This is achieved with the attachment of an additional 126-metre-long (413 ft) lattice jib to the 120-metre (390 ft) main boom. The height of the crawler chassis is an additional 2 m (6 ft 7 in), which gives the lattice structure a total height of 248 m (814 ft). The maximum hoisting height is 245 m (804 ft) and the total ballast used is 1,900 tonnes (1,870 long tons; 2,094 short tons), including 1,500 tonnes (1,476 long tons; 1,653 short tons) of derrick ballast.

=== Representative models and technical data ===
The LR series includes multiple models covering a wide capacity range:

| Model | Maximum lifting capacity | Maximum boom length | Maximum radius |
|---|---|---|---|
| LR 1100.1 | 100 t (98 long tons; 110 short tons) | 60 m (200 ft) | 53 m (174 ft) |
| LR 1110 | 110 t (110 long tons; 120 short tons) | 106 m (348 ft) | 68 m (223 ft) |
| LR 1130.1 | 137 t (135 long tons; 151 short tons) | 126 m (413 ft) | 78 m (256 ft) |
| LR 1160.1 | 160 t (160 long tons; 180 short tons) | 136 m (446 ft) | 84 m (276 ft) |
| LR 1200.1 | 220 t (220 long tons; 240 short tons) | 148 m (486 ft) | 103 m (338 ft) |
| LR 1250.1 | 250 t (250 long tons; 280 short tons) | 148 m (486 ft) | 97 m (318 ft) |
| LR 1300.1 | 300 t (300 long tons; 330 short tons) | 169 m (554 ft) | 143 m (469 ft) |
| LR 1400.1 | 400 t (390 long tons; 440 short tons) | 169 m (554 ft) | 143 m (469 ft) |
| LR 1500 | 500 t (490 long tons; 550 short tons) | 164 m (538 ft) | 144 m (472 ft) |
| LR 1600/2 discontinued | 600 t (590 long tons; 660 short tons) | | |
| LR 1700-1.0 | 700 t (690 long tons; 770 short tons) | 196 m (643 ft) | 160 m (520 ft) |
| LR 1750/2 discontinued | 750 t (740 long tons; 830 short tons) | | |
| LR 1800-1.0 | 800 t (790 long tons; 880 short tons) | 202 m (663 ft) | 164 m (538 ft) |
| LR 11000 | 1,000 t (980 long tons; 1,100 short tons) | 220 m (720 ft) | 184 m (604 ft) |
| LR 11350 | 1,350 t (1,330 long tons; 1,490 short tons) | 220 m (720 ft) | 164 m (538 ft) |
| LR 12500-1.0 | 2,500 t (2,500 long tons; 2,800 short tons) | 200 m (660 ft) | 180 m (590 ft) |
| LR 13000 | 3,000 t (3,000 long tons; 3,300 short tons) | 236 m (774 ft) | 200 m (660 ft) |

Actual performance values depend on crane configuration, boom and jib combinations, counterweight arrangement, load radius, and ground conditions.
