= Liebherr LHM series =

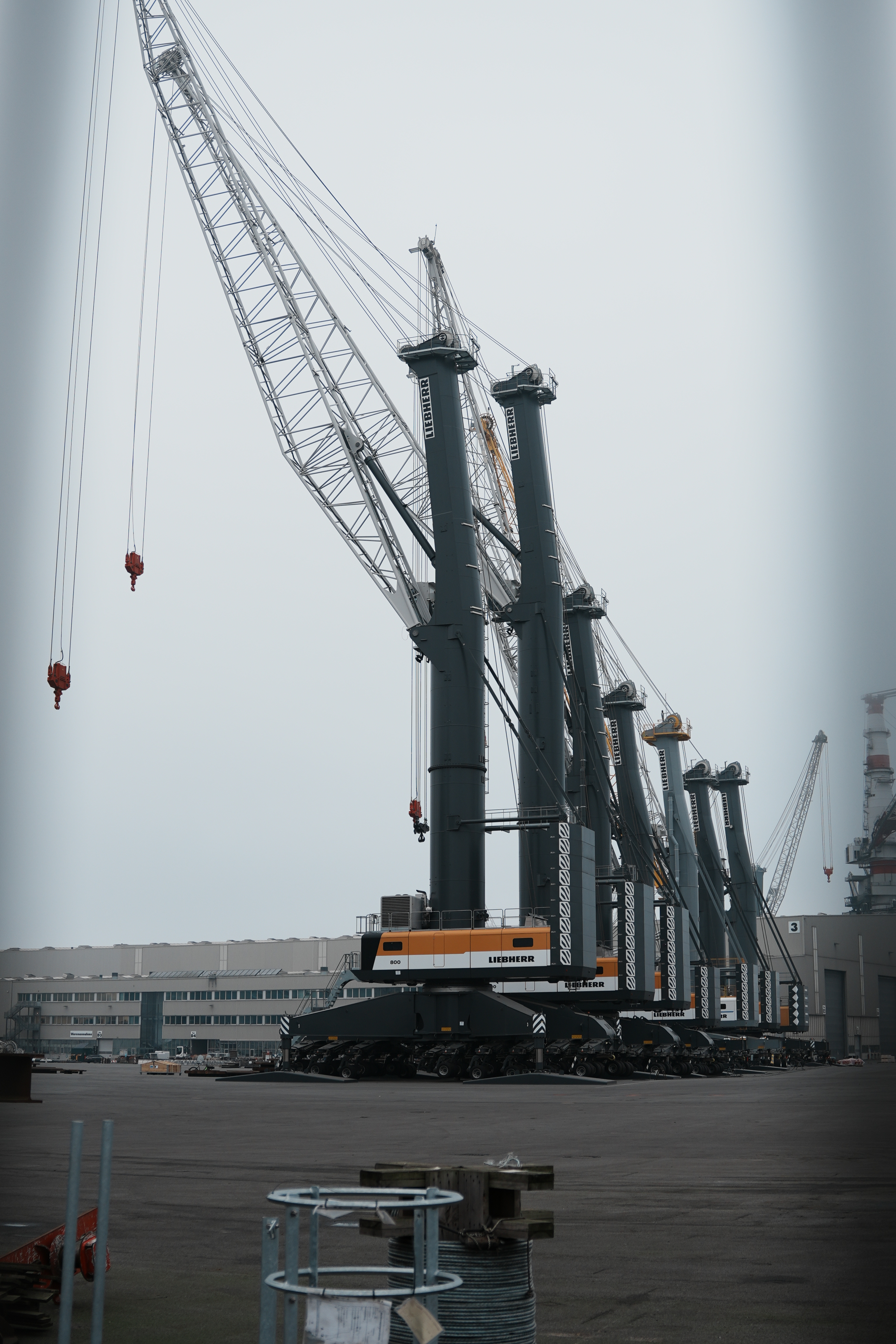
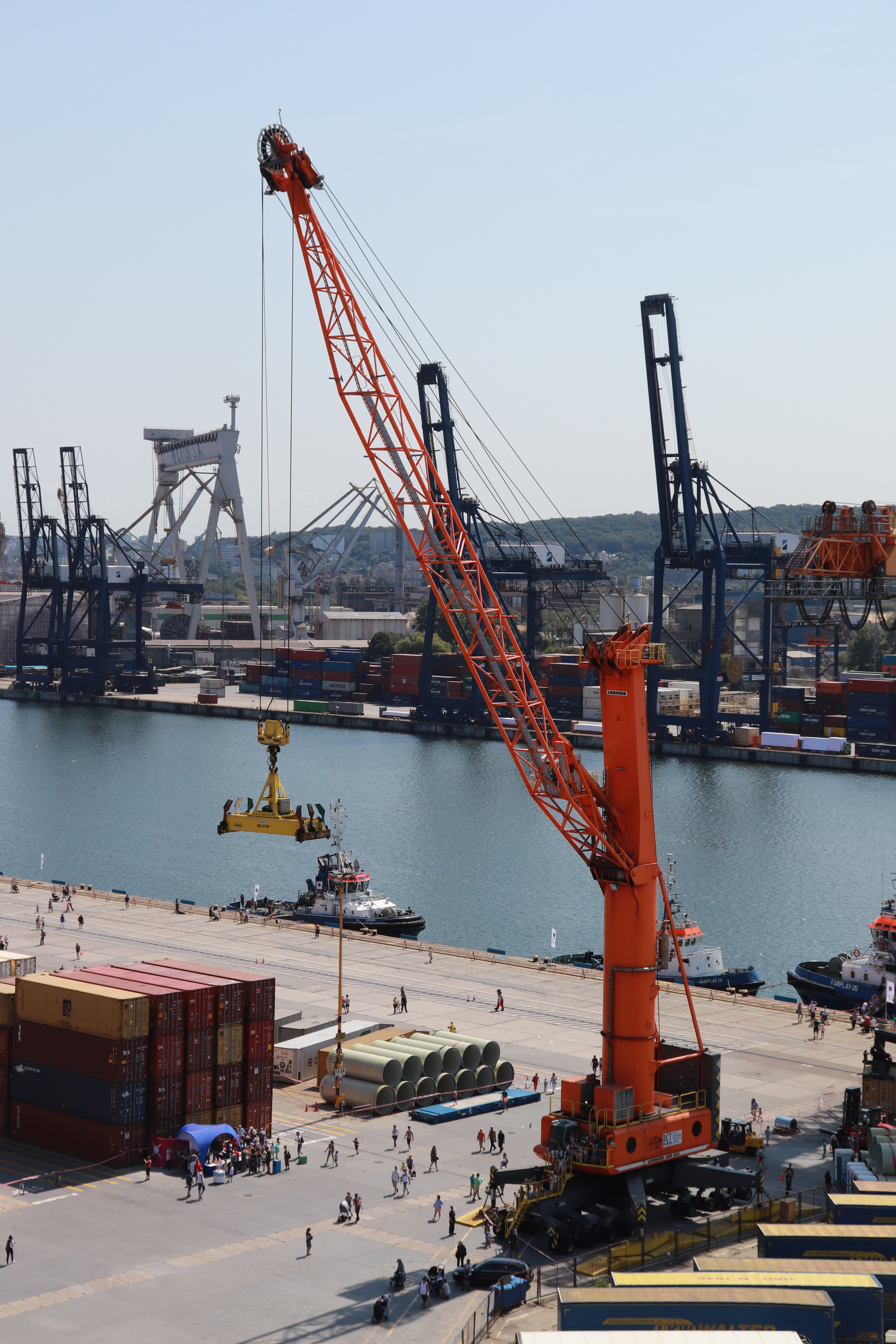
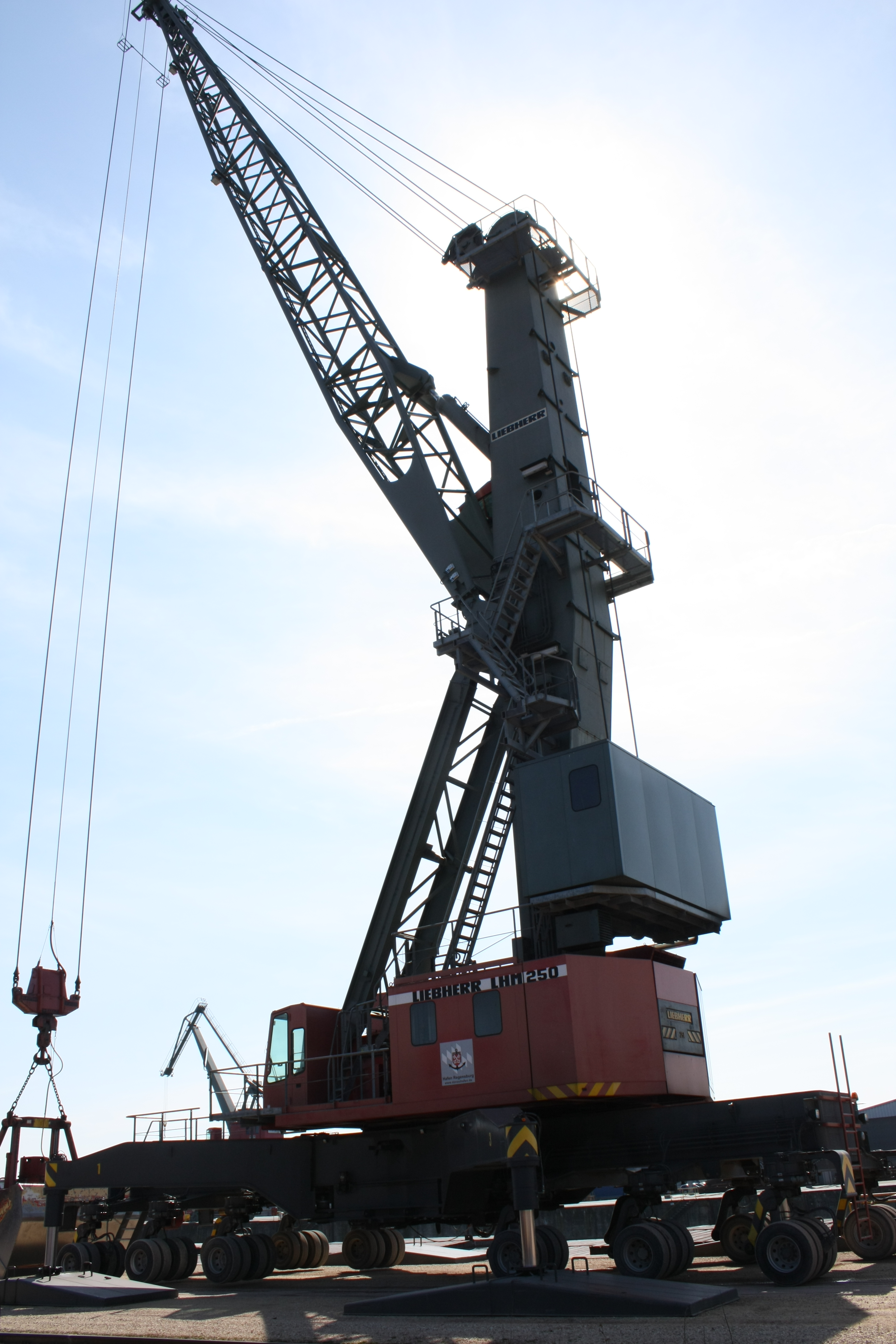
- Liebherr LHM harbour crane

Overview
- Manufacturer: Liebherr-Rostock GmbH
- Production: 1974 – present
- Assembly: Rostock, Germany; Nenzing, Austria (formerly)

Body and chassis
- Layout: 13.5m x 13.5m support base

Powertrain
- Engine: Liebherr D9512 A7; Arrangement: V12; Displacement: 24.2 L (1,480 cu in); Power: 850 kW (1,140 hp); OR; MAN D2842LE; Arrangement: V12; Displacement: 21.9 L (1,340 cu in); Power: 820 kW (1,100 hp)
- Transmission: hydrostatic CVT

Dimensions
- Length: 20.7 m (68 ft) (undercarriage)
- Width: 10.2 m (33 ft)
- Height: 35.9 m (118 ft)
- Curb weight: GVW 438 t (483 short tons) (LHM550)

The Liebherr LHM series are mobile port cranes designed and manufactured in Germany by Liebherr-Rostock GmbH, a subsidiary of the Liebherr Group.

The Liebherr LHM mobile harbour crane series is produced in diesel-hydraulic, electro-hydraulic or hybrid versions.

The series comprises cranes of different size classes intended for cargo handling in seaports and inland ports. Typical applications include container handling, bulk cargo handling and general cargo operations.

== History ==
The first model of the LHM series was the LGM 1130, which was introduced in 1974. Over the decades, Liebherr has introduced models such as the LHM 250 in 1996 and the LHM 550 in 2010.

Since 2019, several LHM 600s have been delivered to Port Canaveral, and they are considered the largest harbor mobile cranes in the United States.

The LHM 600, manufactured in 2025 for Marcegaglia’s site in Ravenna, was the 2,000th unit produced in the LHM series.

== Design and engineering ==
=== Structural design ===
LHM cranes use a four-chord lattice boom design. The boom is connected to the upper structure via a luffing mechanism that allows continuous adjustment of the working radius.

The upper structure is mounted on a slewing ring and supports the machinery deck, operator cabin, winches, and hydraulic components.

=== Drive and power transmission ===
The primary crane motions of hoisting, luffing and slewing are powered by hydrostatic drive systems.

Higher-capacity models such as the LHM 420, LHM 550, and LHM 800 are typically equipped with four-rope (4-line) steel wire winch systems, which are used for clamshell grabs. Smaller models, including the LHM 180 and LHM 280, often use two-rope (2-line) winch systems, suitable for lower maximum loads.

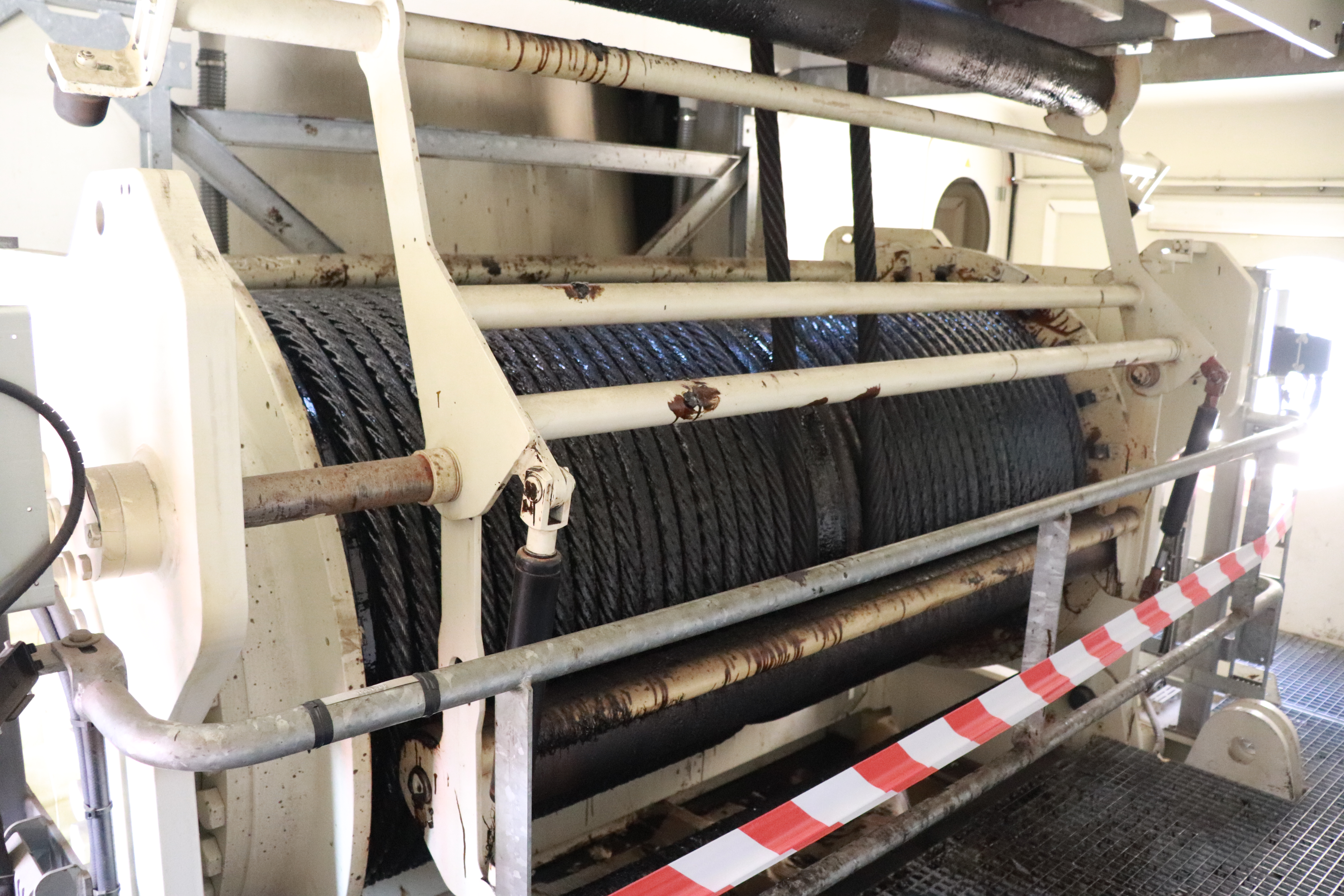
Steel wire rope winch on a Liebherr LHM harbour mobile crane

Diesel engines are standard, while some models can be equipped with hybrid systems combining diesel generators and energy storage systems to reduce fuel consumption and emissions during cyclic operations.

=== Undercarriage configurations ===
A key characteristic of the LHM series is the modular undercarriage concept. Depending on the operational environment, the crane superstructure can be mounted on:

- Rubber-tyred mobile chassis
- Rail-mounted portal undercarriages
- Fixed pedestals
- Rubber-tyred portal systems
- Floating platforms or barges

This allows the same crane type to be adapted to different quay layouts and load-bearing conditions.

=== Representative models and technical data ===
The LHM series includes multiple models covering a wide capacity range:

Model	Maximum lifting capacity	Maximum outreach	Approximate operating weight
LHM 180	64 t (63 long tons; 71 short tons)	35 m (115 ft)	165 t (162 long tons; 182 short tons)
LHM 280	84 t (83 long tons; 93 short tons)	40 m (130 ft)	241 t (237 long tons; 266 short tons)
LHM 420	124 t (122 long tons; 137 short tons)	48 m (157 ft)	371 t (365 long tons; 409 short tons)
LHM 550	154 t (152 long tons; 170 short tons)	54 m (177 ft)	439 t (432 long tons; 484 short tons)
LHM 800	308 t (303 long tons; 340 short tons)	64 m (210 ft)	742 t (730 long tons; 818 short tons)

Actual performance values depend on configuration, load radius, and attachment type.

== Competition ==
The LHM crane competes directly with other (rubber-tyred) harbour cranes made by Konecranes, Sennebogen and Sumitomo Heavy Industries.
