= Willi Liebherr =

German-Swiss entrepreneur

- Born: 1947 (age 78–79)
- Education: ETH Zurich
- Occupation: Businessman
- Title: Member of the Liebherr Group administrative board
- Children: 6

Willi Liebherr (born in 1947) is a German-Swiss entrepreneur. He is currently a member of the board of Liebherr Group. As of 2026, his estimated net worth is US$10.5 billion.

== Life and education ==
Willi Liebherr grew up in Upper Swabia's, Kirchdorf an der Iller and in Biberach. He graduated as an engineer from the Swiss Federal Institute of Technology in Zurich and lives in Nussbaumen, Switzerland.

== Career ==
In 1971, he joined the family business, Liebherr Group. After the death of Hans Liebherr in 1993, Willi Liebherr led the construction machinery manufacturer together with his sister Isolde, and was chairman of the board of Liebherr-International AG in Bulle from 1999 until March 2023. His son, Jan Liebherr, became the new president of the administrative board, Willi Liebherr remained a member of the board.

== Honors ==
- Honorary doctorate from the University of Freiburg, 2006
- Chevalier of the Legion of Honour, 2010
- Honorary citizenship of Kirchdorf, 2022

== Wealth ==
On the 2018 Forbes list, the Liebherr siblings ranked 222nd, with approximately US$7.1 billion.

In 2021, on the Bloomberg Billionaires Index, the net worth of Liebherr was approximately US$9.43 billion, making him one of the richest people in Switzerland and Germany and ranking 263rd.

In 2023, the Liebherr family's assets were estimated at 9.3 billion by Bilanz, placing them 19th on a list of the 300 richest people in Switzerland.

As of 2026, the Bloomberg Billionaires Index estimates his net worth at US$10.5 billion.
