= Liebherr LS series =

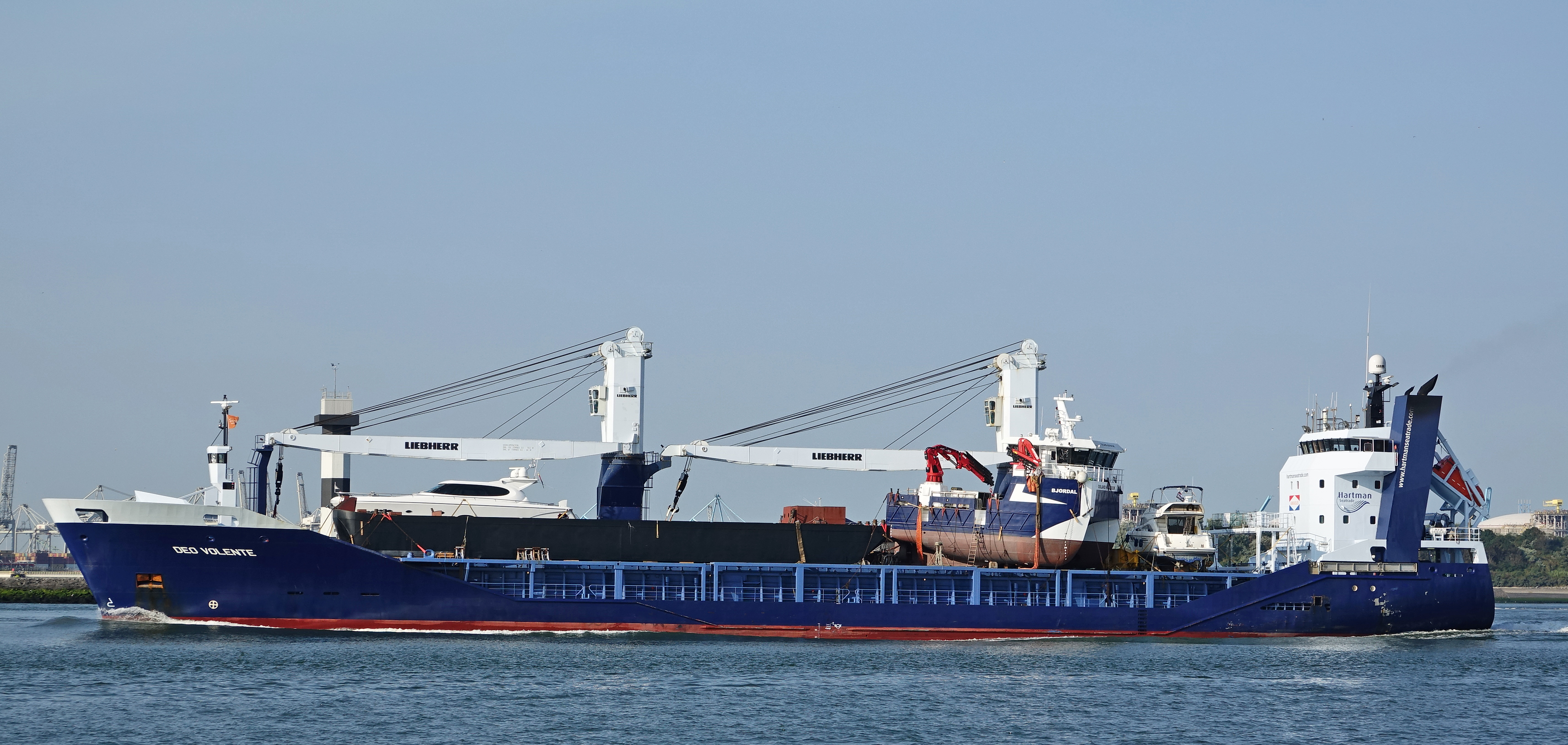
- Two Liebherr LS cranes on the Deo Volente

Overview
- Manufacturer: Liebherr-Rostock GmbH
- Production: 1958 - present
- Assembly: Rostock, Germany; Nenzing, Austria (formerly)

Powertrain
- Engine: electric
- Transmission: VFD

The Liebherr LS Series is a range of heavy-lift ship cranes developed and manufactured by Liebherr as part of its maritime crane portfolio.

The LS series is designed for installation on multipurpose vessels, heavy-lift ships and offshore support vessels. Depending on configuration, LS cranes are capable of handling heavy offshore components, container handling, and bulk cargo.

== History ==
Liebherr Group began manufacturing ship cranes in 1958, when it delivered its first ship crane (type B36, approximately 3 tonnes lifting capacity).

The LS series was introduced in response to the growing demand for heavy cargo handling on board vessels.

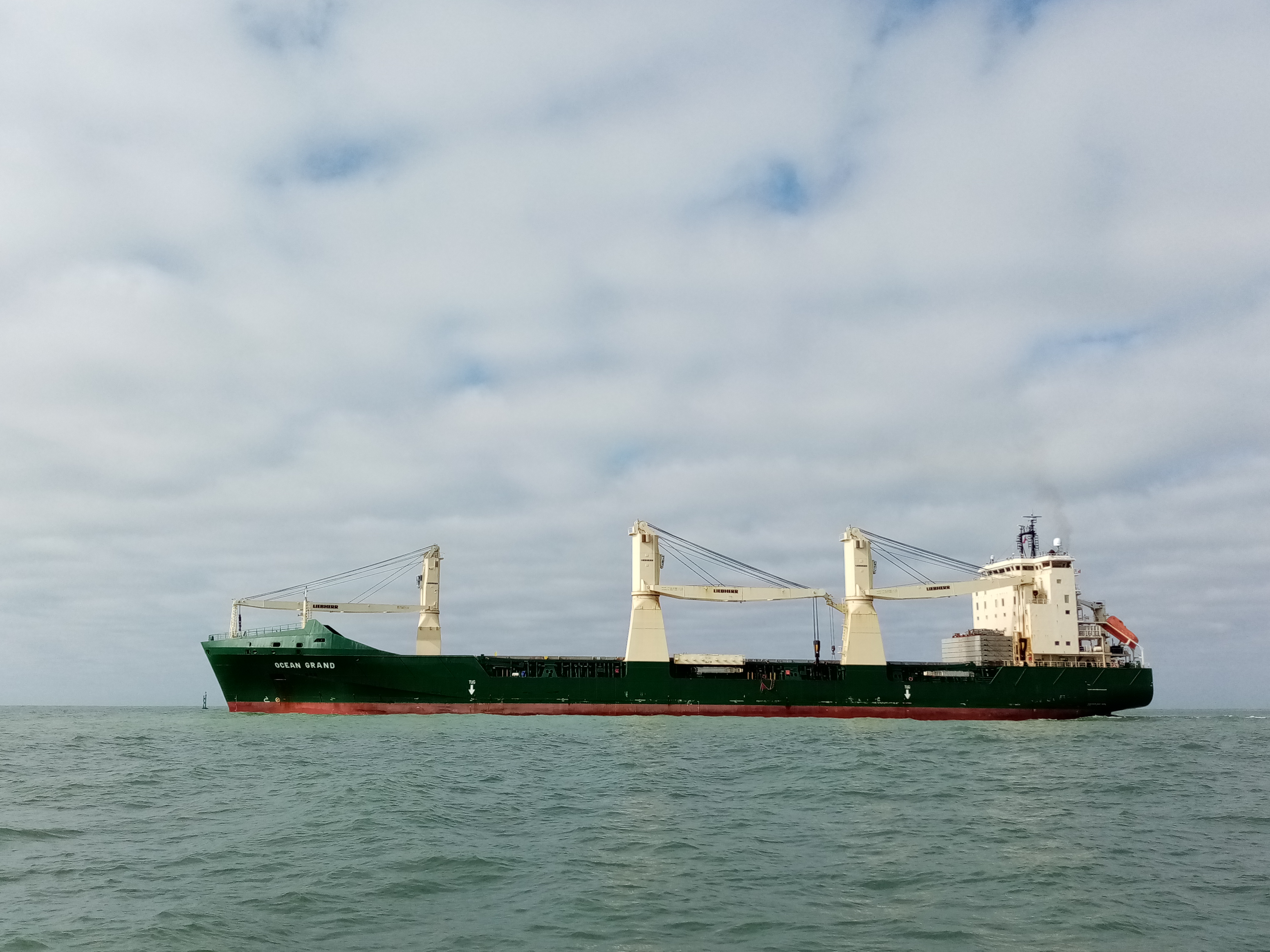
Three LS cranes on the Ocean Grand in Casablanca, Morocco

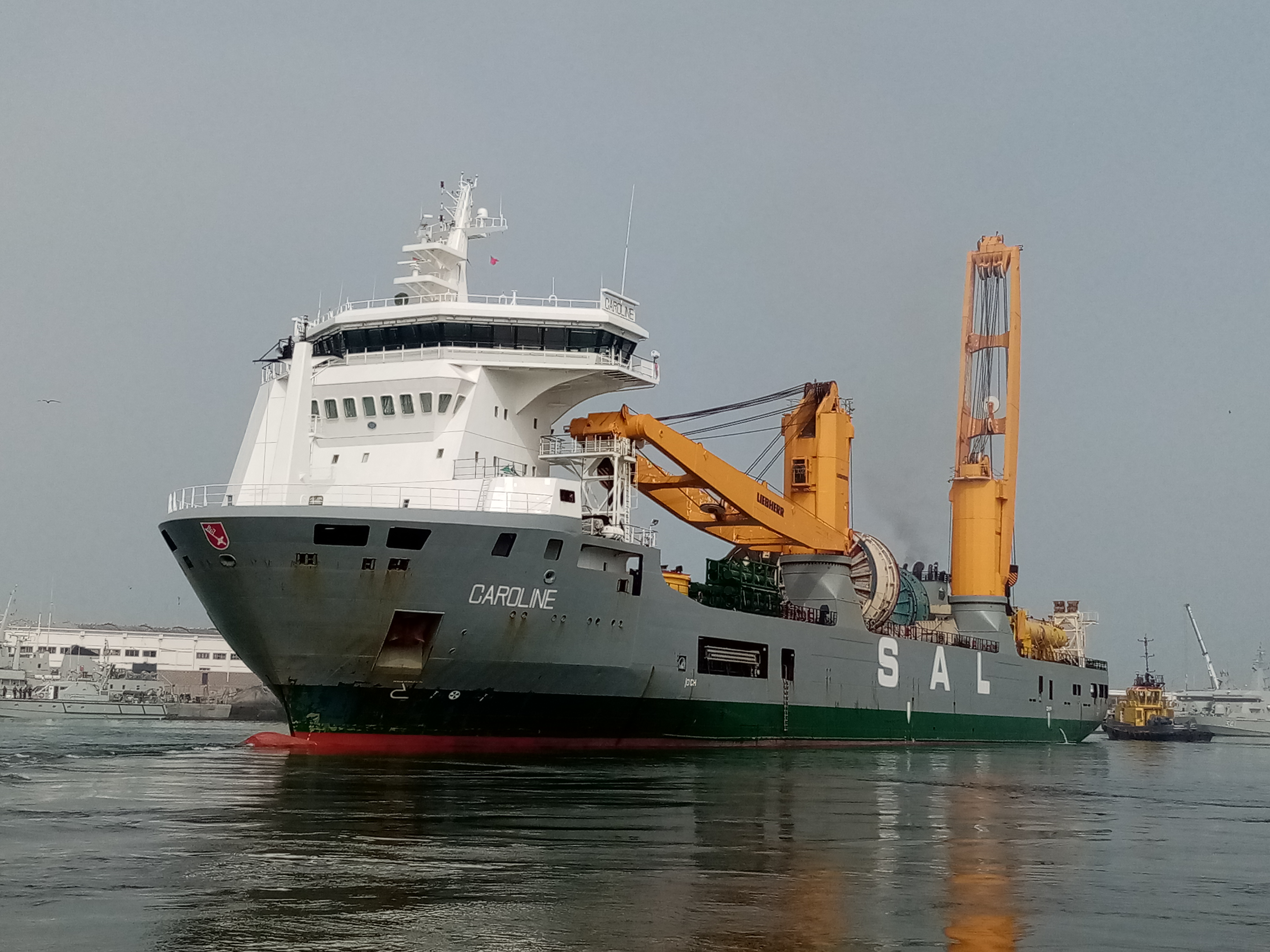
Two LS cranes installed on the Caroline of SAL Heavy Lift

== Design and engineering ==
The cranes are mounted on a slewing ring and pedestal structure integrated into the vessel's deck. Power supply can be provided by the ship's electrical system or by dedicated generator units, depending on vessel configuration.

=== Structural design ===
LS cranes are constructed with a pedestal, slewing platform, machinery house, and a box-type jib. The jib structure is typically of welded steel construction. The pedestal transfers loads from the crane into the vessel's hull structure.

=== Representative models and technical data ===
The LS series includes models with different lifting capacities and outreach lengths.The lifting capacity generally exceeds 120 t (120 long tons; 130 short tons) per crane. In tandem operation, two or more cranes work together to lift a load that exceeds the SWL of a single crane.

Model	Maximum lifting capacity	Typical outreach
LS 150	120–180 t (120–180 long tons; 130–200 short tons)	33 m (108 ft)
LS 250	250 t (250 long tons; 280 short tons)	33–36 m (108–118 ft)
LS 500 E	400–500 t (390–490 long tons; 440–550 short tons)	33–36 m (108–118 ft)
LS 800 E	800–1,000 t (790–980 long tons; 880–1,100 short tons)	39 m (128 ft)
