= Katharina Liebherr =

Swiss businesswoman

Katharina Liebherr is a Swiss businesswoman who is the minority owner of Southampton.

== Career ==
In 2010, Liebherr became the owner of English Premier League side Southampton following the death of her father Markus Liebherr.

On 14 August 2017, Liebherr sold an 80% stake to Chinese businessman Gao Jisheng for around £210 million. She retained her 20% stake within the club. Following the sale of the club to Sport Republic in January 2022, Liebherr retained her minority shareholding. However, her shares have been diluted following several rounds of investment by Sport Republic.
