= Tinka's Boy =

Show jumping horse (1989–2022)

- Breed: Dutch Warmblood
- Discipline: Showjumping
- Sire: Zuidpool
- Dam: Esprit
- Maternal grandsire: Zeus
- Sex: Stallion
- Foaled: 1989; Wijk aan Zee, Netherlands
- Died: 2022; Servas, France
- Colour: Chestnut, snip and two hind socks
- Breeder: J.P. Muntjewerf
- Owner: Isolde Liebherr
- Rider: Markus Fuchs

Earnings
- 2 million+ CHF

Major wins
- 2001 FEI Jumping World Cup™ Final, Gothenburg 1997 FEI Jumping Nations Cup 2004 Aachen Nations Grand Prix

Awards
- 1999 FEI European Championships, Team & Individual Silver 2000 FEI Jumping World Cup Final, Las Vegas, Individual Silver 2000 Sydney Olympics, Team Silver 2001 European Championships, Team Bronze 2004 FEI Jumping World Cup Final, Milan, Individual Bronze

Other awards
- 2004 Athens Olympics, Team fifth overall

Tinka's Boy (1989–2022) was a chestnut Dutch Warmblood stallion who competed in show jumping, largely ridden by Swiss equestrian Markus Fuchs. Over an eight-year show career, Tinka's Boy won 26 international Grand Prix events and over 2 million Swiss Francs in prize money. He stood just under 16hh (162cm high at the withers).

== Background ==
Tinka's Boy started his career with British rider Nick Skelton. After winning the 1997 FEI Jumping Nations Cup in Gijon, Tinka's Boy was sold to Isolde Liebherr to be ridden by Markus Fuchs of Switzerland.

In 2000, Fuchs and Tinka's Boy were part of the Swiss showjumping team to take silver medals in the team showjumping competition at the Sydney Olympic Games. The next year, the pair won the 2001 FEI Jumping World Cup Final, displacing reigning champion Rodrigo Pessoa. That same year, Fuchs and Tinka's Boy jumped a clear round at the Aachen Nations Cup Show in Germany, which helped the Swiss team top the leaderboard at the event.

In 2004, Fuchs and Tinka's Boy were selected for the Athens Olympics, and were part of the Swiss team that finished fifth in the showjumping event. Fuchs and Tinka's Boy placed 46th individually, despite being favorites going into the competition. Tinka's Boy made an impression on the Sydney crowds by making an unscheduled stop to defecate before his round. It was usual behavior for the horse prior to a jumping round. Fuchs later said, "He's always doing this to me...I've asked him a few times but he hasn't given me an answer yet."

In December 2004, Tinka's Boy suffered an injury while taking part in the jump off at a grand prix event in La Coruña, Spain. It was found later that the horse tore his left front superficial flexor tendon and underwent rehabilitation. After treatment, it was decided he would not be able to return to international competition.

At the 2006 Gothenburg Horse Show, Tinka's Boy was formally retired in a ceremony where he was unsaddled to a standing ovation from the audience. Upon retirement, Tinka's Boy became a full-time breeding stallion. As a stallion, he was an approved sire by the KWPN (Dutch Warmblood) and by the French Studbook for Selle Francais. Tinka's Boy has over 500 registered descendants. One of his daughters, Tinka's Serenade was ridden by Ireland's Billy Twomey in the 2012 Olympic games.

Tinka's Boy died at age 33 in January 2022 at the Béligneux Le Haras stallion station in France.

== Pedigree ==
Pedigree of Tinka's Boy (KWPN)
Sire Zuidpool (KWPN)	Amor (Holsteiner)	Herrscher (SWB)	Heristal (Trakenher)
Sire Zuidpool (KWPN)	Amor (Holsteiner)	Herrscher (SWB)	Diana (SWB)
Sire Zuidpool (KWPN)	Amor (Holsteiner)	Barba (Holsteiner)	
Sire Zuidpool (KWPN)	Olga (KWPN)	Persian Path S XX	Sovereign Path XX
Sire Zuidpool (KWPN)	Olga (KWPN)	Anory (Sgldt)	
Dam Esprit (KWPN)	Zeus (SF)	Arlequin X	
Dam Esprit (KWPN)	Zeus (SF)	Urielle (SF)	
Dam Esprit (KWPN)	Urloffine (KWPN)	Orlof (Trakhener)	
Dam Esprit (KWPN)	Urloffine (KWPN)	Malinda (KWPN)	
