= Liebherr =

Equipment manufacturer company

Liebherr-International AG
- Logo since 2021

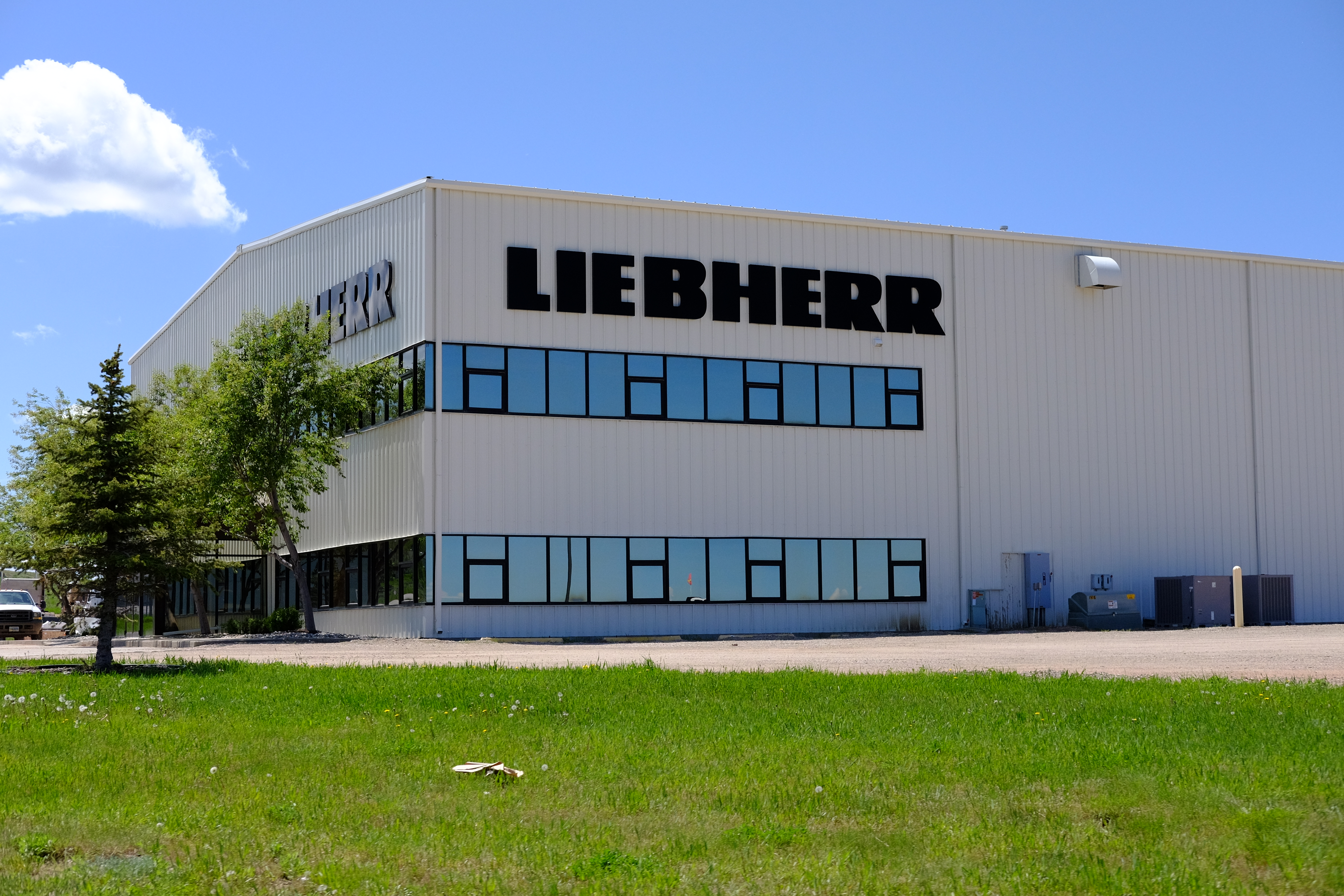
- Liebherr in Gillette, Wyoming, U.S.
- Type: Aktiengesellschaft
- Industry: Heavy machinery Domestic appliances
- Founded: 1949; 77 years ago Kirchdorf an der Iller, West Germany
- Founder: Hans Liebherr
- Headquarters: Bulle, Switzerland
- Key people: Jan Liebherr, President; Stéfanie Wohlfarth, Vice President
- Products: Construction and agriculture machinery, refrigerators
- Revenue: ▲€14.772 billion (2025)
- Operating income: ▲€603 million (2019)
- Net income: ▲€367 million (2023)
- Total assets: ▲€16.404 billion (2023)
- Total equity: ▲€8.901 billion (2023)
- Number of employees: ▲53,659 (2023)
- Website: liebherr.com

Liebherr (German: [ˈliːphɛʁ]) is a German-Swiss multinational equipment manufacturer based in Bulle, Switzerland, with its main production facilities and origins in Germany.

Liebherr consists of over 130 companies organized into 11 divisions: earthmoving, mining, mobile cranes, tower cranes, concrete technology, maritime cranes, aerospace and transportation systems, machine tools and automation systems, domestic appliances, and components. It has a worldwide workforce over 53,000, with fourteen billion euros in revenue for 2023.

Established in 1949 by Hans Liebherr in Kirchdorf, Württemberg-Hohenzollern, West Germany, the business is still entirely owned by the Liebherr family. After his death in 1993, Isolde and Willi Liebherr, Hans' daughter and son led the company, becoming vice president and president of the administrative board respectively of the Switzerland–based Liebherr-International AG in 1999. In March 2023, Stéfanie Wohlfarth became vice president and Jan Liebherr president of the administrative board. Isolde Liebherr and Willi Liebherr remain members of the administrative board and several other family members are actively involved in corporate management. In 2005, Forbes magazine listed them as billionaires. In 1974, the Franklin Institute awarded Hans Liebherr the Frank P. Brown Medal.

== History ==
Hans Liebherr was conscripted for military service in World War II. During the conflict, Liebherr served with the Ulm Pioneer Battalion 101, which was subordinate to the 101st Light Infantry Division and fought under Army Group South in the German-Soviet War. After returning from the war, Hans founded Liebherr in 1949. Initially, the company produced affordable tower cranes.

Subsequently, Liebherr expanded into the production of aircraft components. It also branched into appliances, including commercial chiller displays and freezers, as well as domestic refrigerators. The group also produces some of the world's biggest mining and digging machinery, including loaders, excavators, and extreme-sized dump trucks. The T 282 B is the world's second-largest truck (after BelAZ 75710). The group's nine-axle mobile crane, the LTM 11200–9.1—with a 100-metre (328 ft) telescopic boom—in 2007 received the heavy-lifting industry's Development of the Year award for being the world's most powerful example of such a machine. Another example is the LHM 600, which has been the largest mobile harbour crane in the United States since its delivery to Port Canaveral in 2019.

Over the years, the family business has grown into a group of varied companies, and has locations in many countries, including Germany, Australia, Britain, Ireland, Turkey, and the United States. Since 1958, its Irish factory in Killarney, County Kerry, has built container cranes, exporting them worldwide through the port of Fenit. One atypical venture of the Liebherr Group is its ownership of six hotels in Ireland, Austria and Germany.

In 2013, the company commenced an AU$65 million expansion of their local headquarters in Adelaide, Australia; this development includes adding a new three-storey office, workshops, warehouse, component plant, and distribution centre to the Para Hills facility. In the U.S., the group in 2012 started spending US$45.4 million (about €34.1 million) on a three-year renovation and expansion of its Newport News, Virginia, factory, offices, and warehouse. The company sought to increase its production there beyond 100 mining trucks per year. In April 2014, Liebherr announced that it would invest €160 million at its production site in Bulle.

By 2017, Liebherr had expanded its workforce to 43,869 employees. That same year, the company announced it had achieved the highest turnover in the Group's history, with sales of €9,845 million. In 2018, Liebherr generated a turnover of €10,551 million, exceeding €10 billion for the first time in the company's history.

Liebherr's aerospace division has been a supplier to various tier one companies, such as providing the landing gear and air management systems for the COMAC C919 airliner as well as the folding wingtips for the Boeing 777X airliner. Liebherr is also a significant supplier to the European aerospace company Airbus, such as the maintenance and repair of the heat exchangers on the Airbus A320 airliner. It has also produced components for both military and civil rotorcraft, such as the ventilation and heating system of the HAL Light Utility Helicopter.

In March 2020, Liebherr launched their first APAC HQ in Singapore. One year later, it was announced that the company would collaborate with General Electric to develop hydrogen fuel cells.

In the 2020s, the company was reportedly researching methods of reducing both the size and weight of aerospace components as well as to make greater use of electric power and the 3D printing of aircraft components, including small-scale electromechanical actuators intended for use on light aircraft, business jets, and helicopters.

== Products ==
The line of products manufactured by the company includes:

- Earth-moving equipment
- Mining equipment
- Cranes: mobile, crawler, tower, maritime, mobile construction
- Diesel engines
- Deep foundation machines
- Concrete-handling equipment
- Material-handling equipment
- Electric motors
- Port (container-handling) equipment
- Machine tools
- Automation systems
- Domestic refrigerators and freezers
- Aircraft equipment
- Hotels
- Mechanical, hydraulic, electrical, and electronic components and subcomponents

== Gallery ==
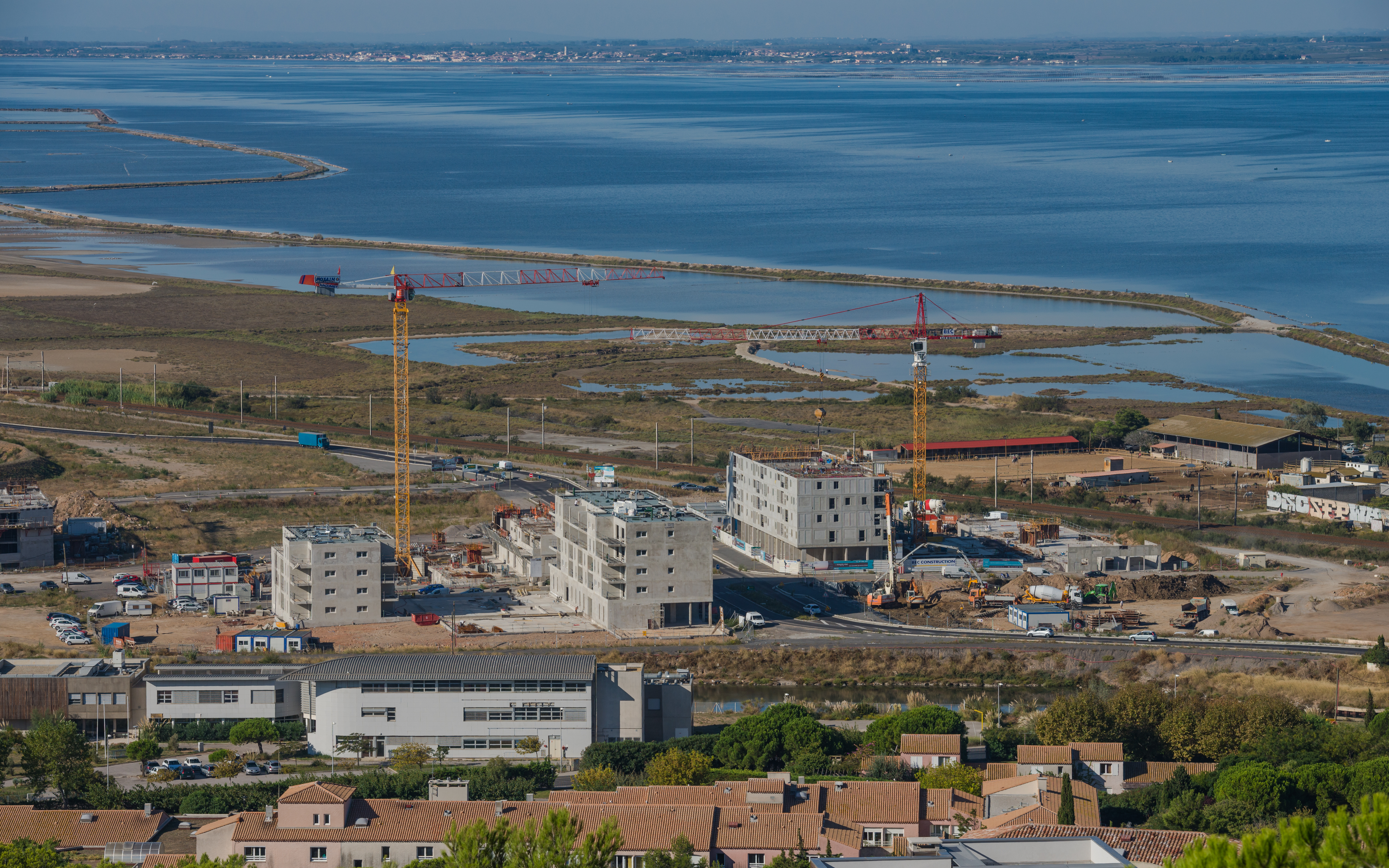
On the right a Liebherr top-slewing crane of the EC-H Litronic series

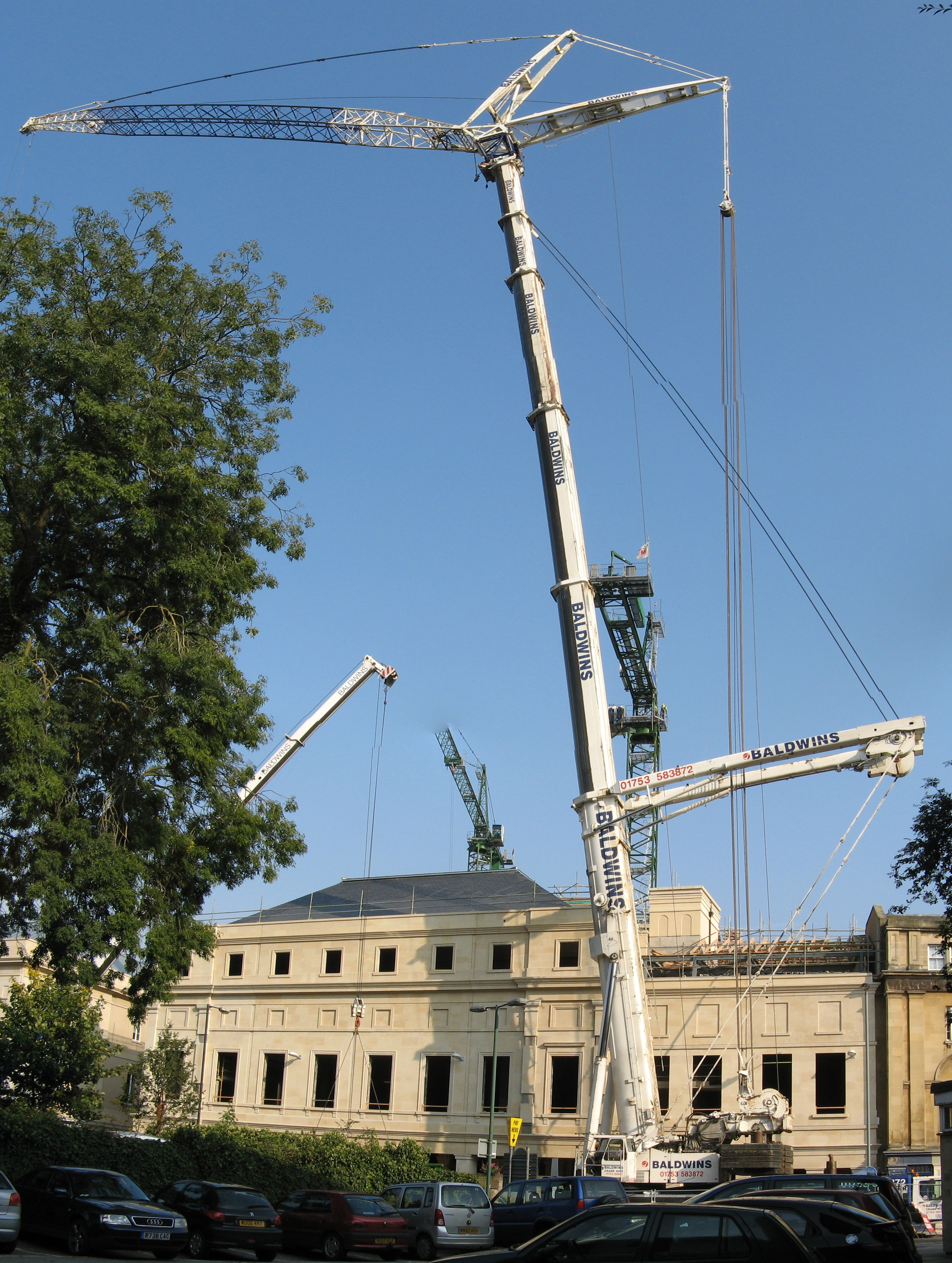
Liebherr LTM 1500 telescopic crane

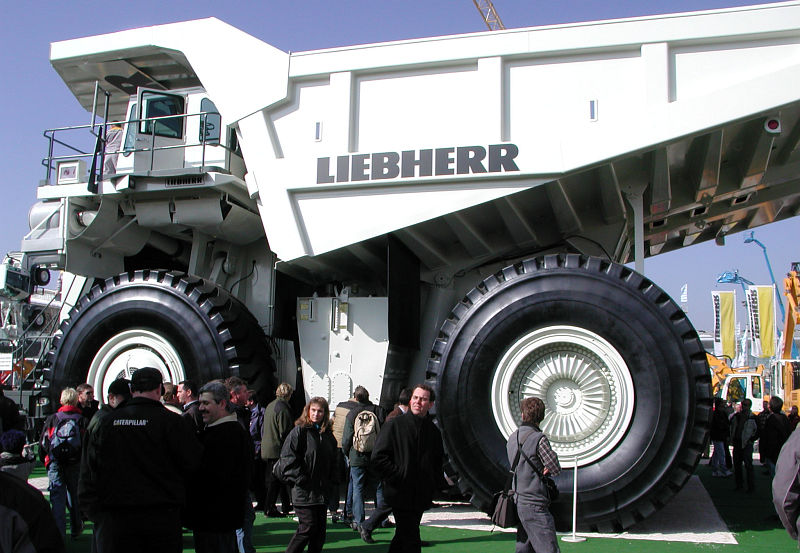
Liebherr T 282 B mining truck

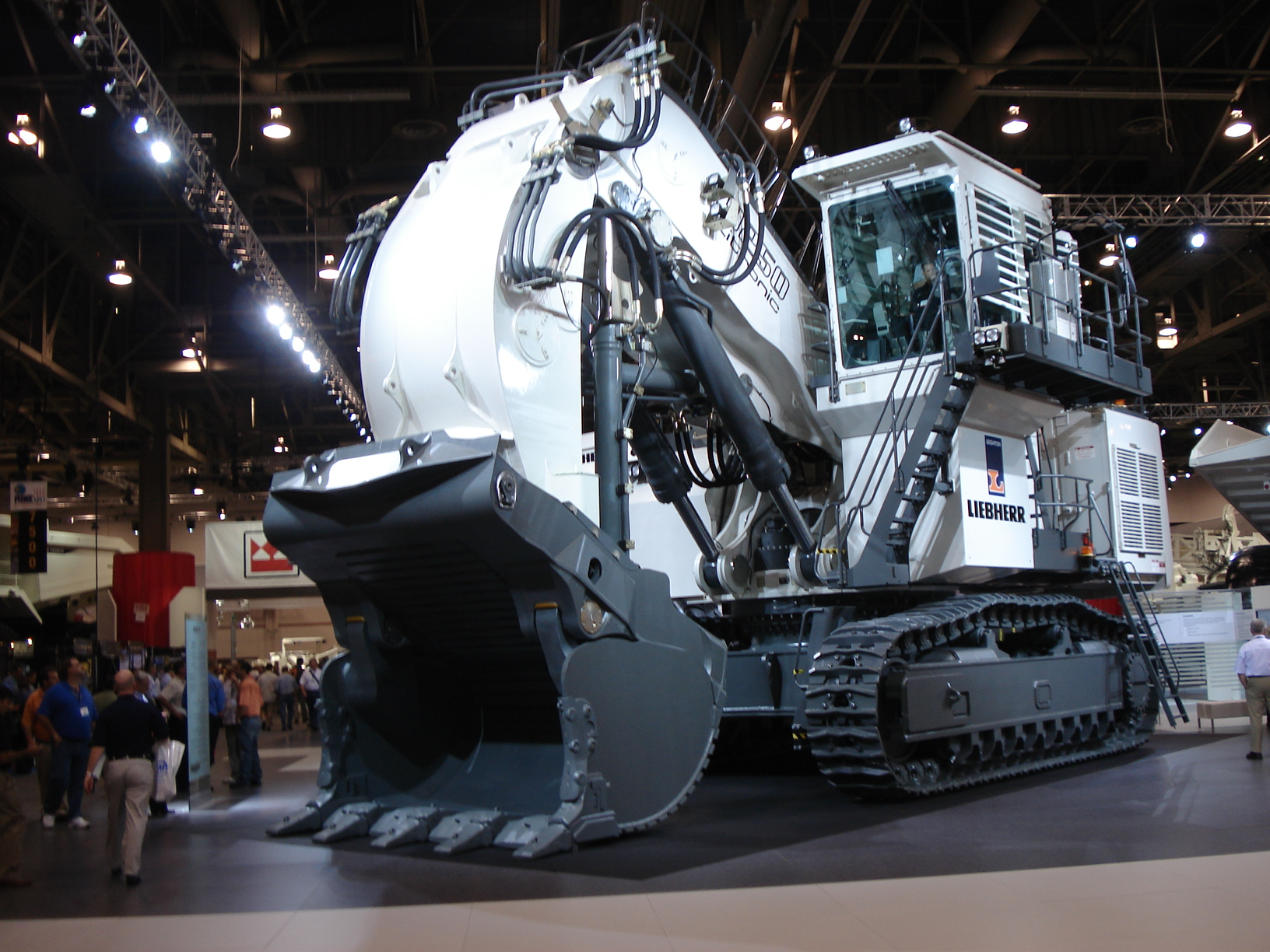
Liebherr hydraulic shovel

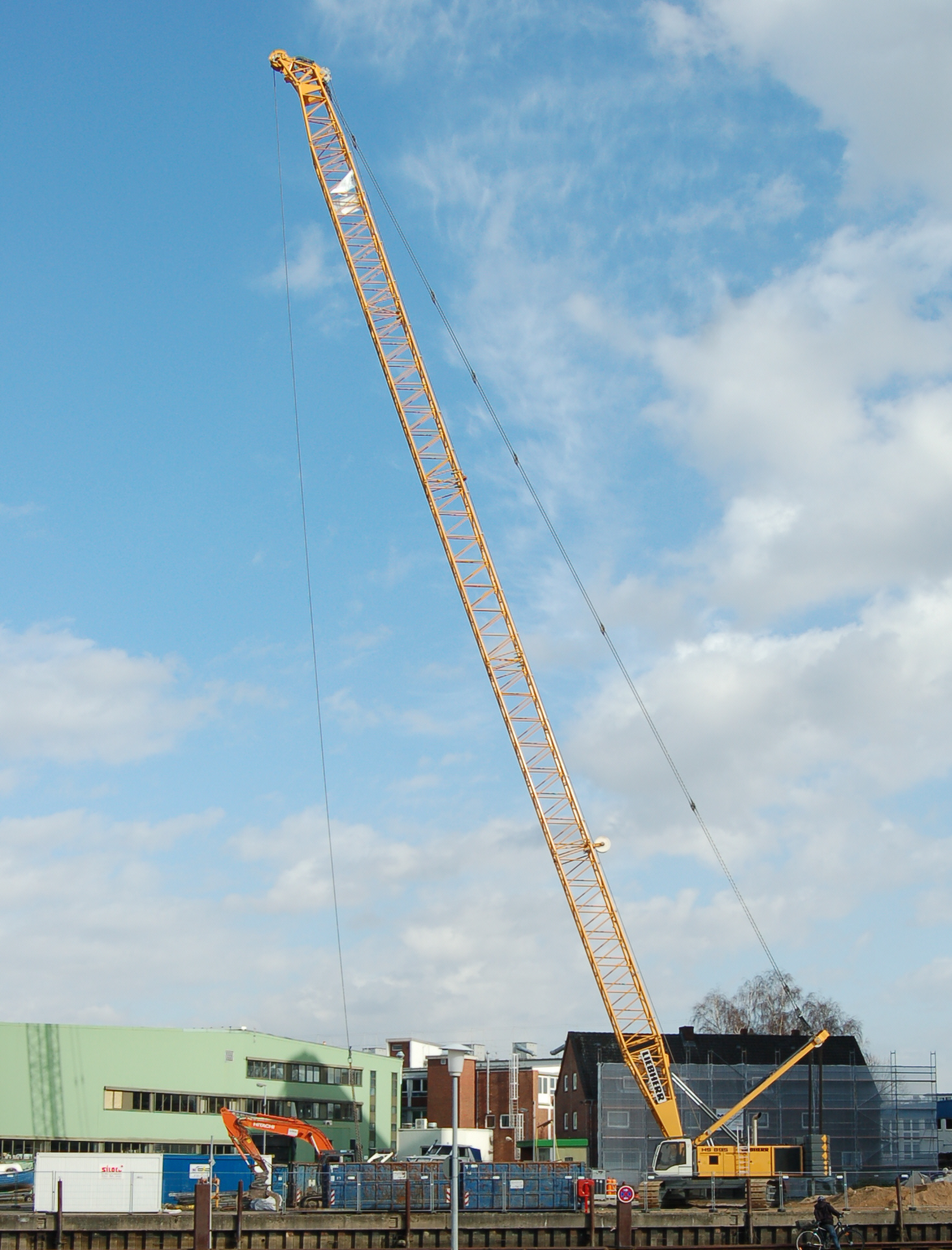
Liebherr HS 895 Hydroseilbagger

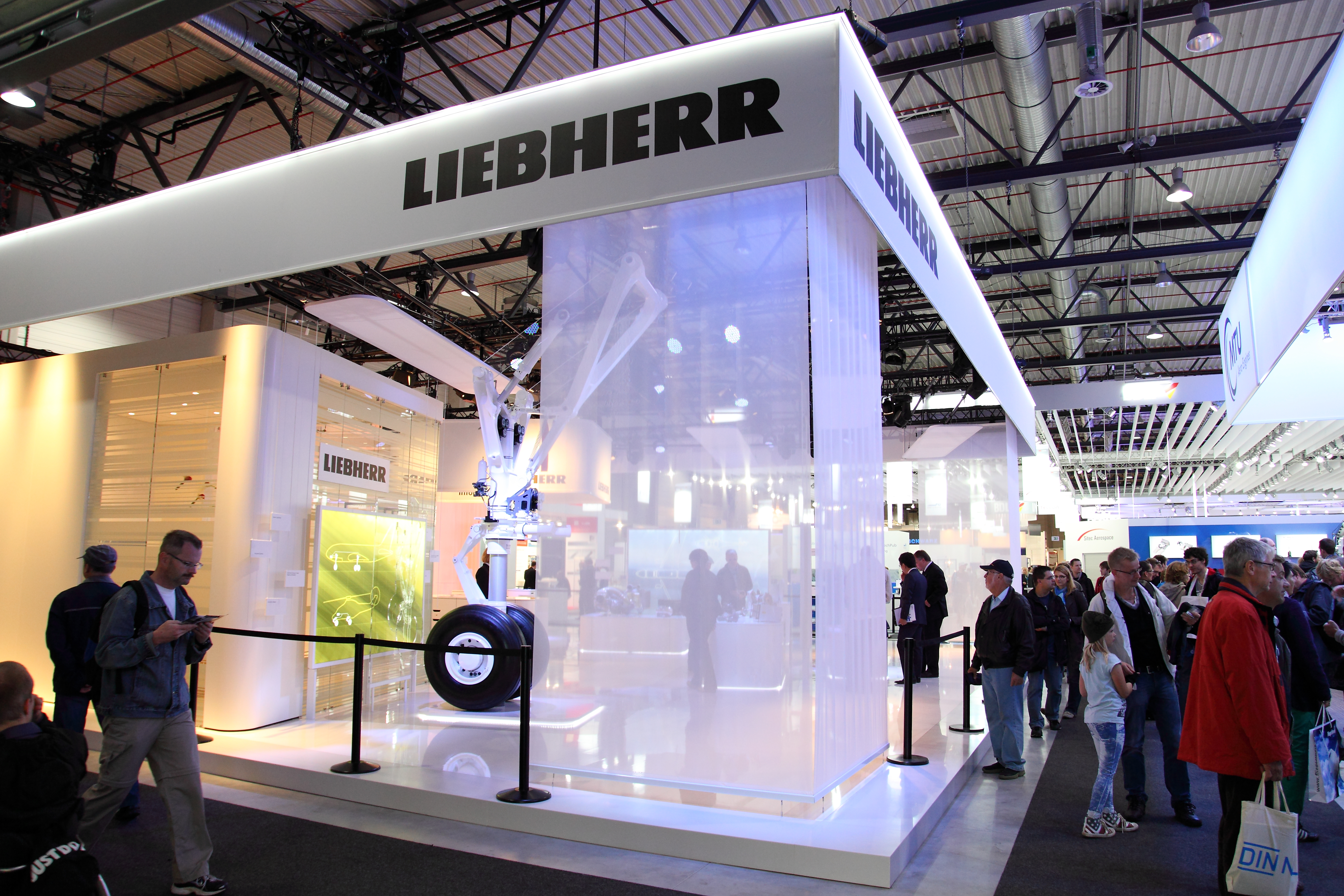
Mock-up of the A350 nose gear at ILA 2012

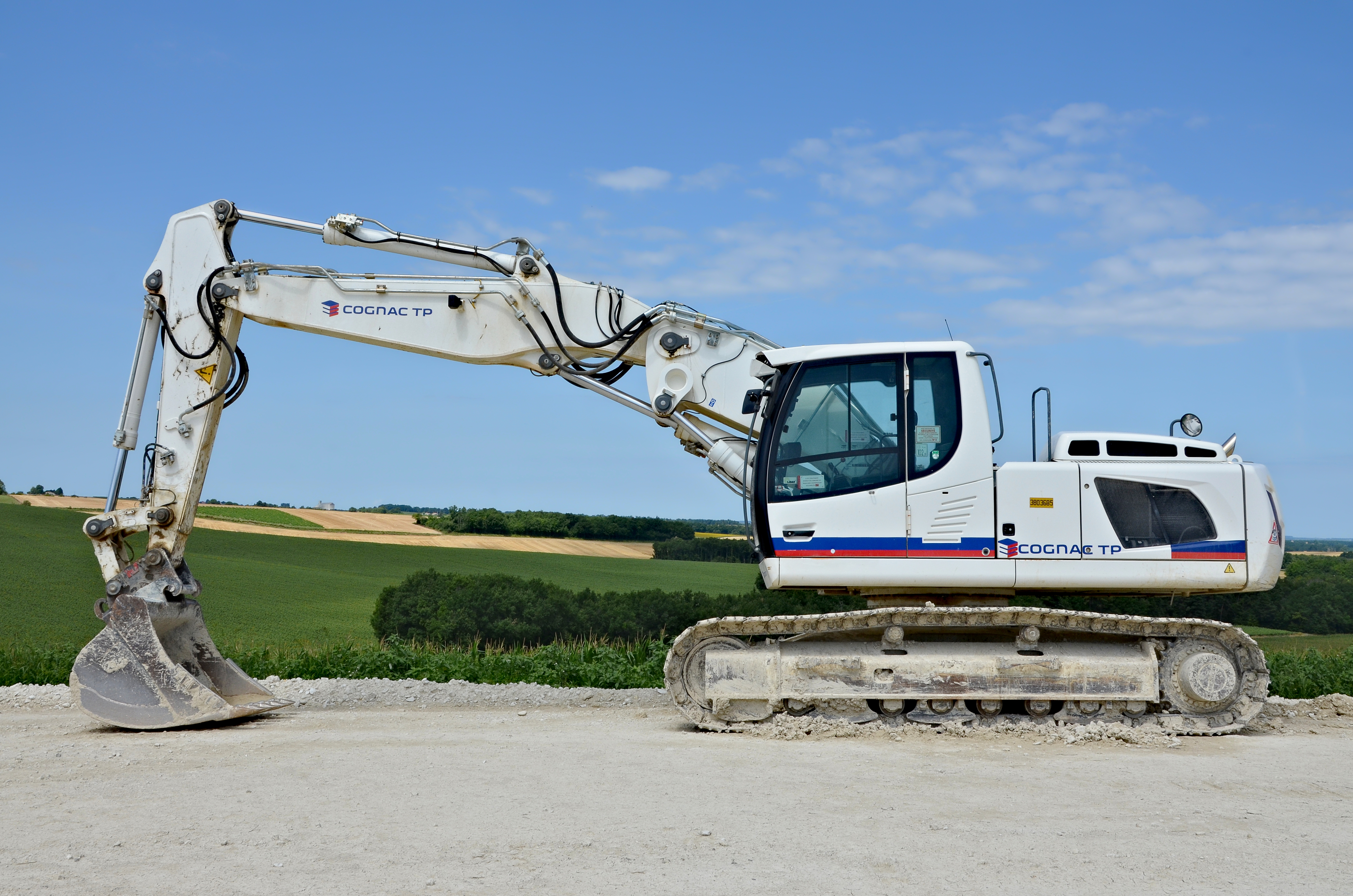
Liebherr R926

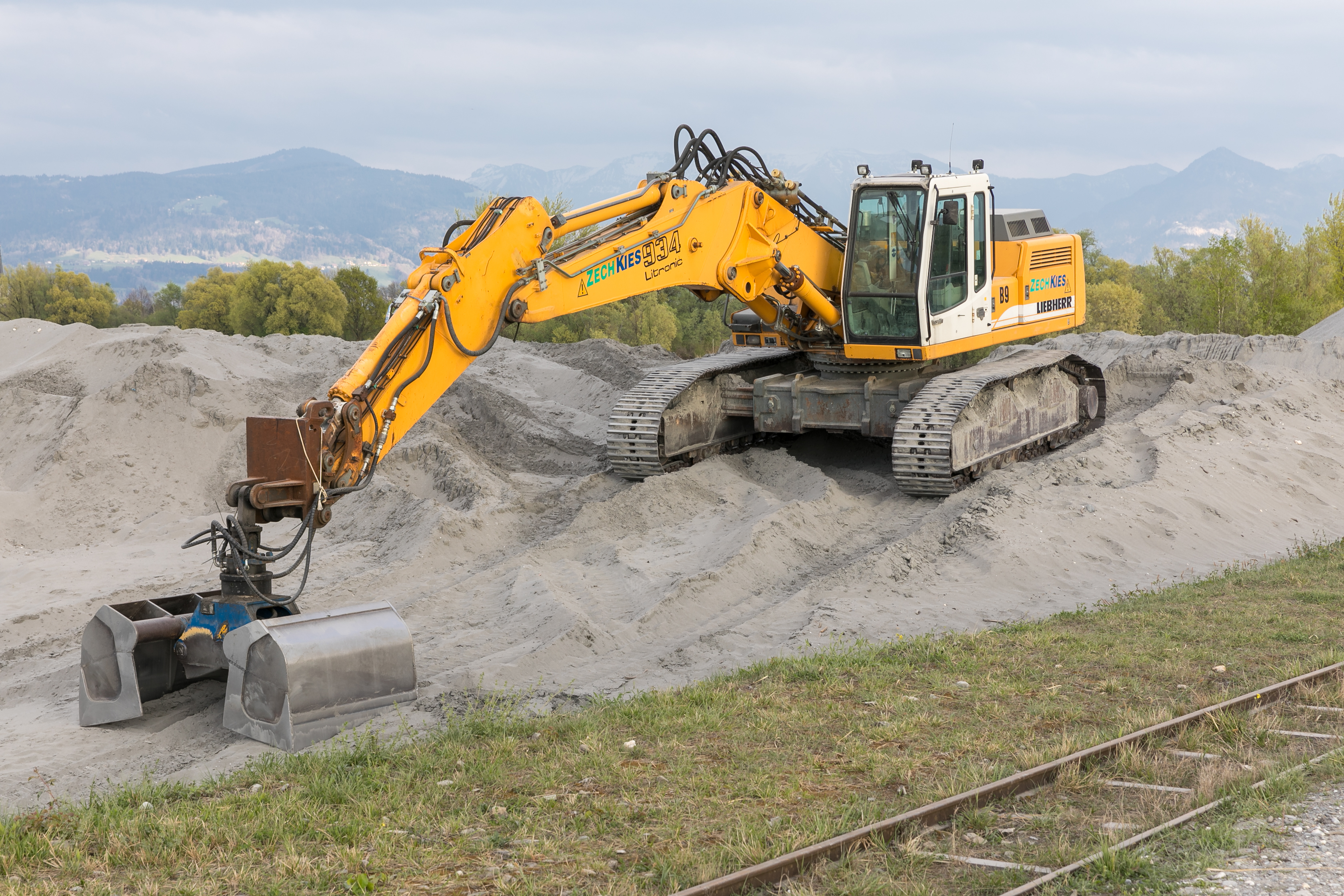
Liebherr R934 Litronic

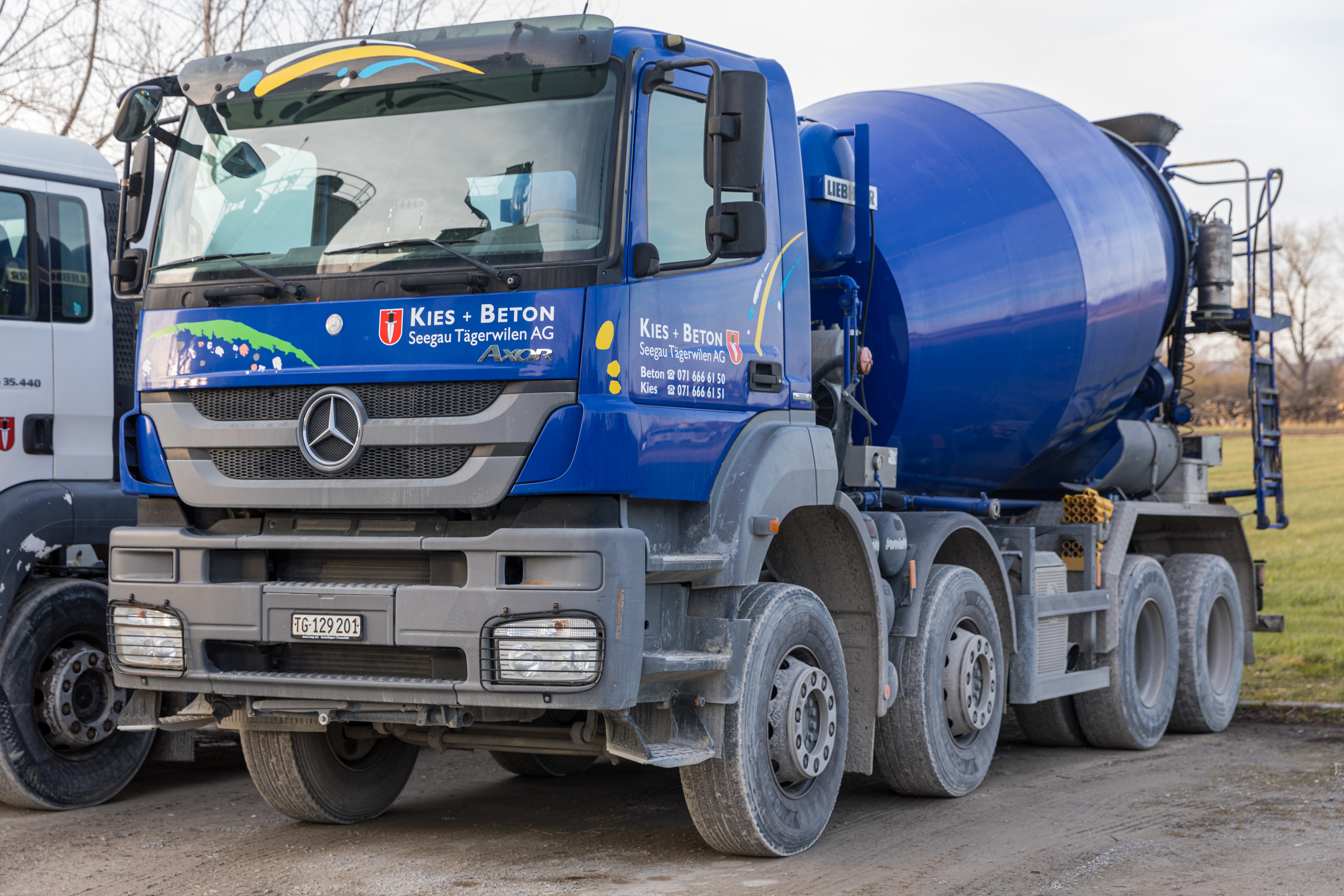
Truck with Liebherr concrete mixer

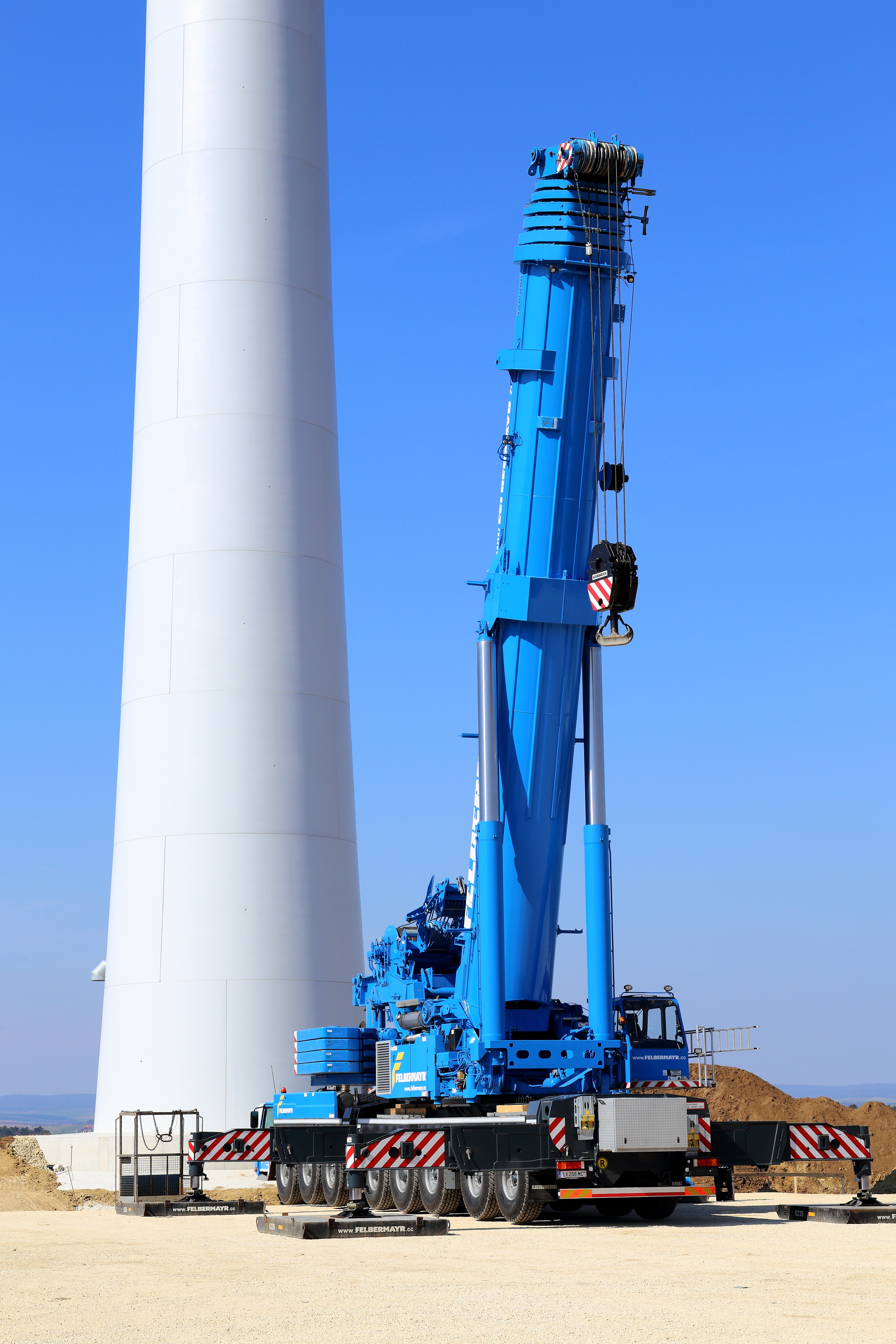
Liebherr LTM 1500–8.1

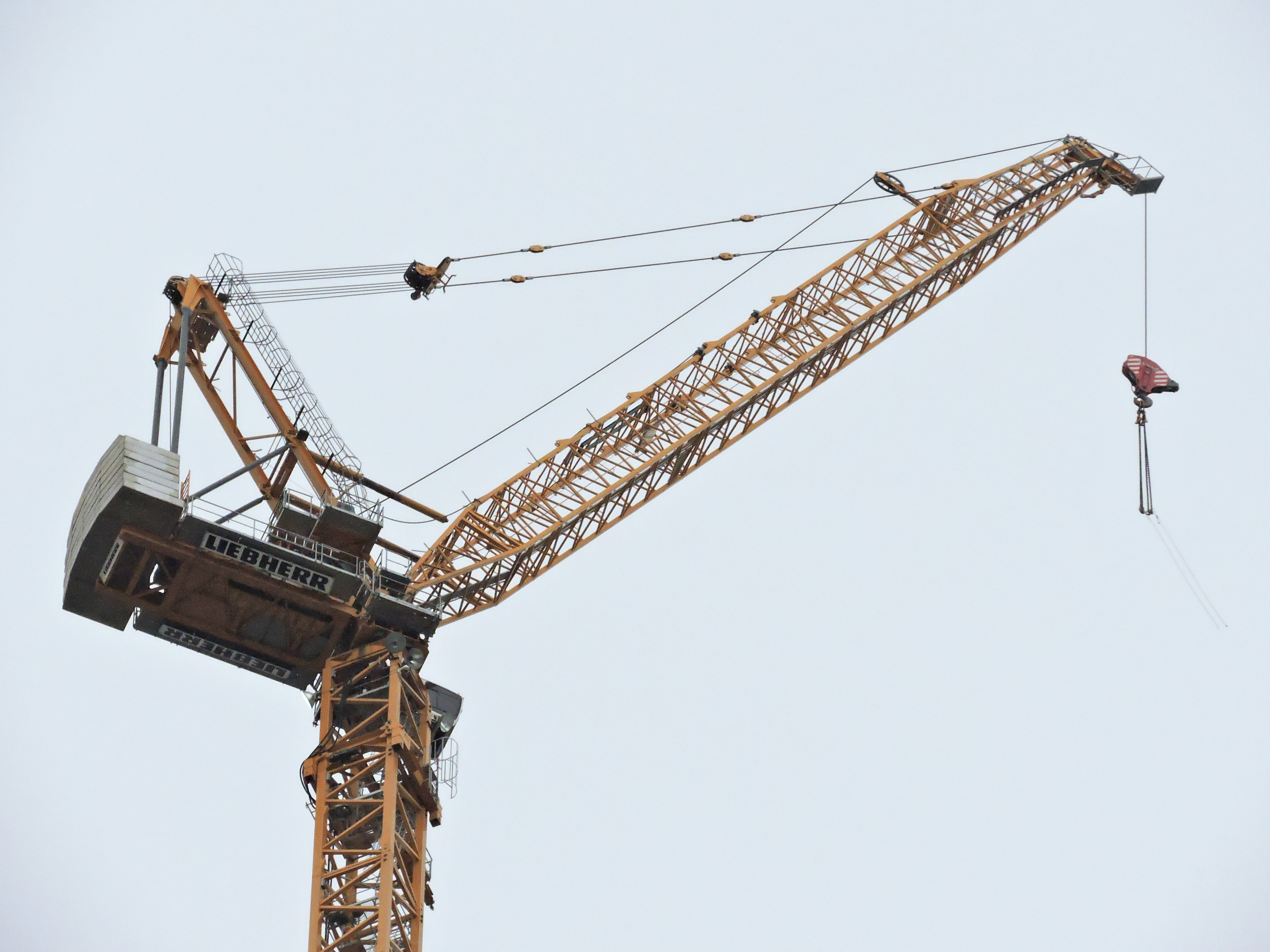
Liebherr-710 HC-L 32/64 Litronic tower crane

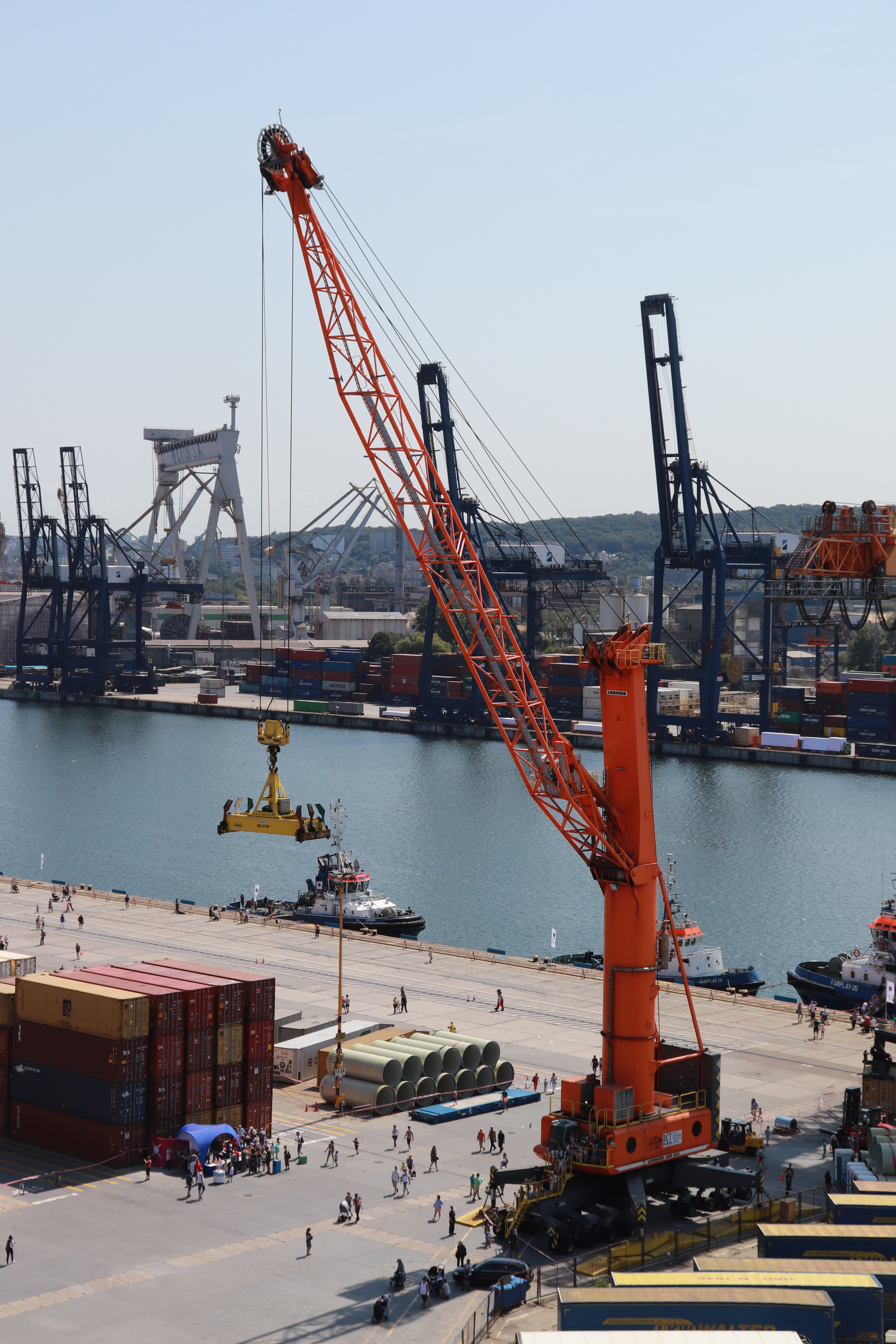
Liebherr LHM 400 harbor crane

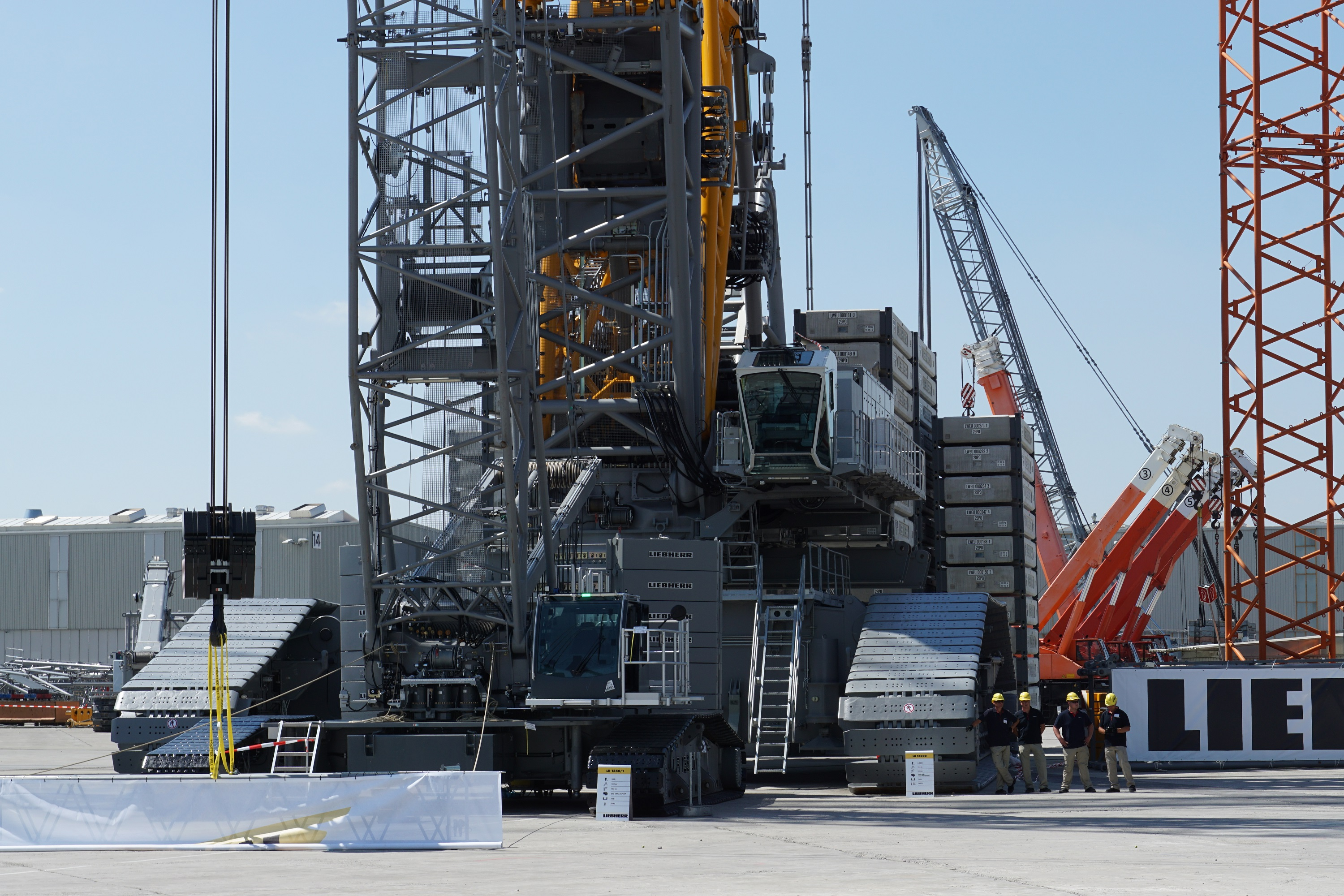
Liebherr LR 13000 crawler crane

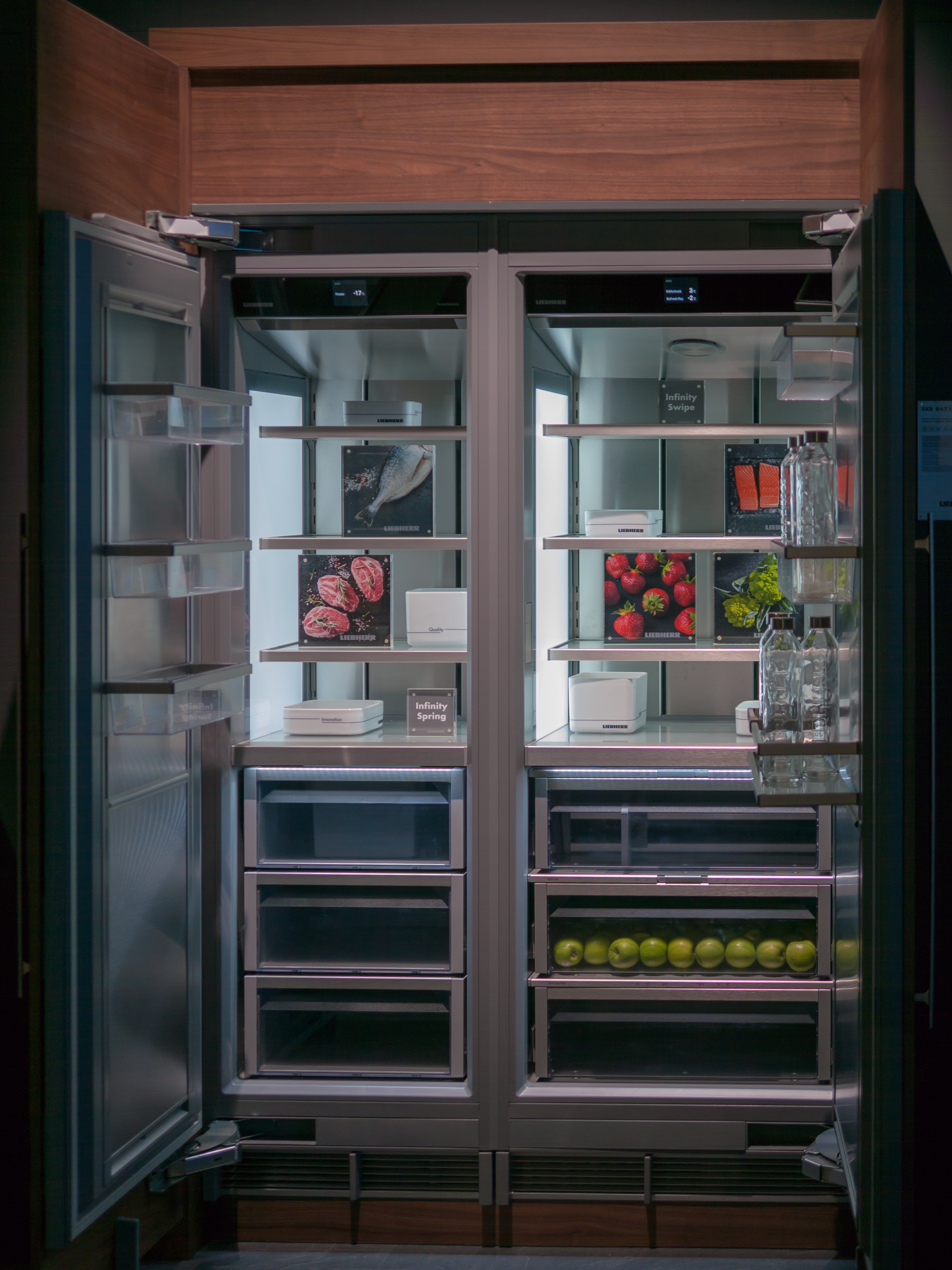
Domestic appliances (mainly refrigerators)

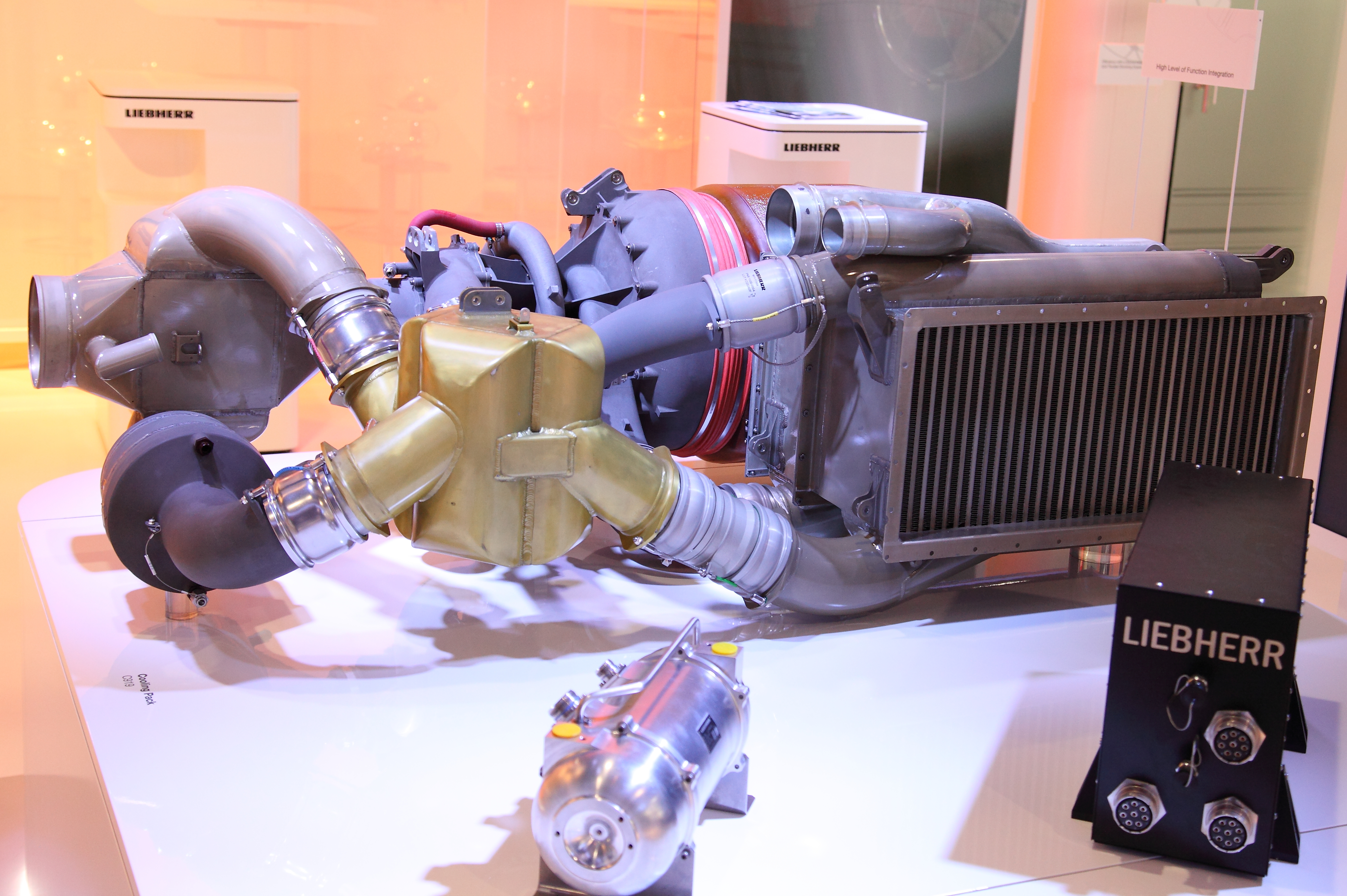
Airplane air-conditioning unit

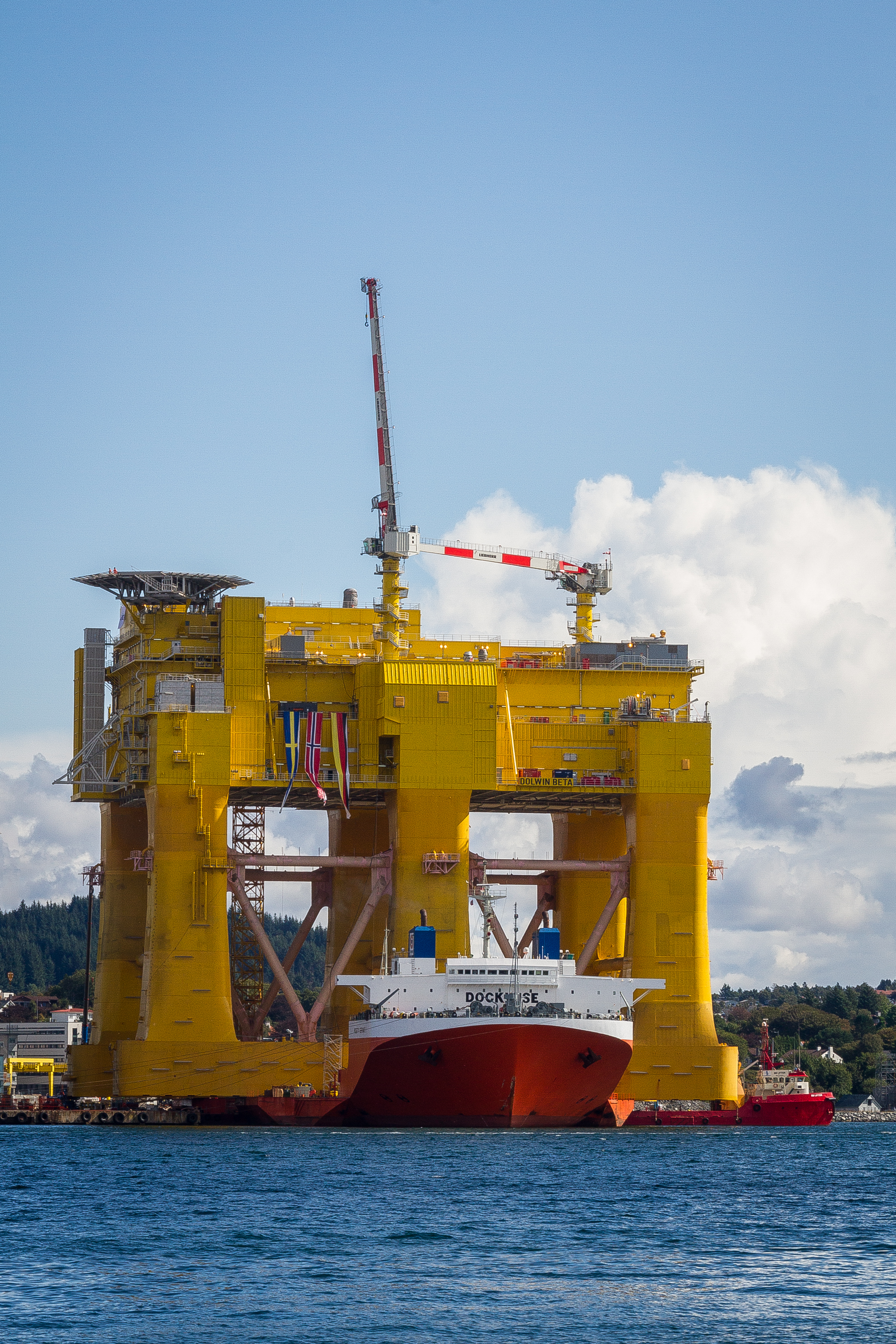
Two Liebherr RL offshore cranes on the HVDC DolWin2 platform

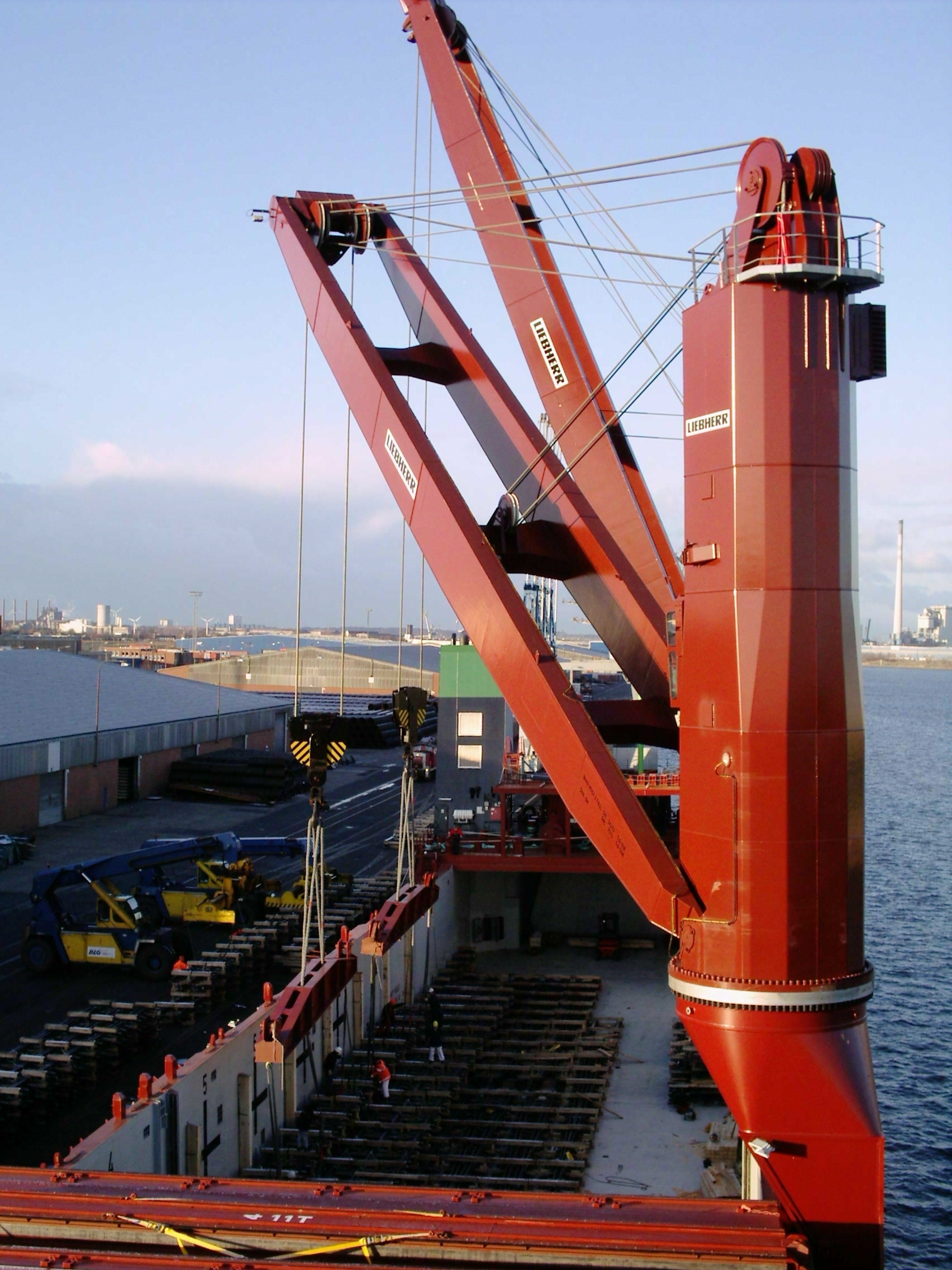
A Liebherr LS ship crane

== See also ==
- Liebherr Aerospace
- Liebherr 2010 World Team Table Tennis Championships
- Construction
- Crane (machine)
