= Markus Fuchs (equestrian) =

Swiss equestrian

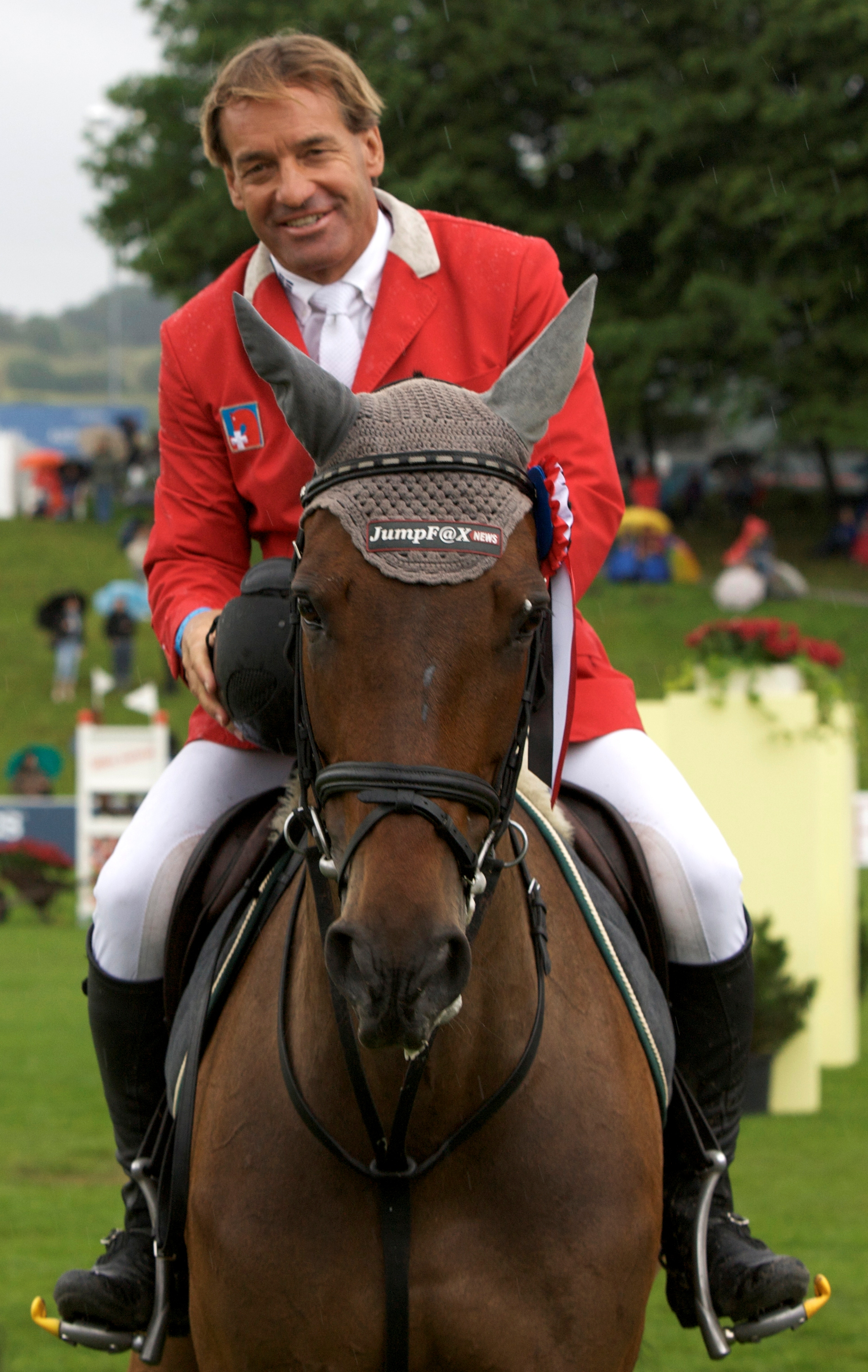
- Fuchs in 2009

Personal information
- Born: 23 June 1955 (age 71) Abtwil, Switzerland
Medal record
Equestrian
Representing Switzerland
Olympic Games
Silver medal – second place	2000 Sydney	Team jumping

Markus Fuchs (born 23 June 1955 in Abtwil, Switzerland) is a Swiss show jumper who competed at five Olympics between 1988 and 2004. He was part of the Swiss team that won silver at the 2000 Olympics.

He is, jointly with shooter Gabriele Bühlmann, the seventh Swiss sportsperson to compete at five Olympics, after middle-distance runner Paul Martin, equestrians Henri Chammartin and Gustav Fischer, javelin thrower Urs von Wartburg, equestrian Christine Stückelberger, and Alpine skier Paul Accola.

At the European Show Jumping Championships, he came second in the individual event in 1999 on Tinka's Boy. He was also part of the Swiss teams that won gold in 1995, silver in 1999 and 2005, and bronze in 1987, 1989, 1991 and 2003.

Despite being favorites for the 2004 Olympics, Fuchs and Tinka's Boy came in 46th individually. Fuchs was recovering from a thigh injury at the time. He later said, “At Athens I got five years older”.

In 2008, despite ranking third in the global FEI world rankings, Fuchs declined joining the Swiss show jumping team squad for what would have been his sixth Olympic games appearance. The next year, Fuchs announced his retirement from competition on 6 June 2009. He became the coach of the Italian national team, which won a silver medal that same year in the European Show Jumping Championships (2009 Windsor).

In 2024, he was named as the coach of the Swiss show jumping team for the 2024 Paris Olympic Games after the passing of their current coach, Lesley McNaught.

== See also ==
- List of athletes with the most appearances at Olympic Games
- Tinka's Boy, Markus' mount for his appearances at the 2000 and 2004 Olympic Games.
- Thomas Fuchs, Markus' brother who is also a Swiss Olympic show jumper.
- Martin Fuchs, Markus' nephew who is also a Swiss show jumper.
