= Kirchdorf an der Iller =

- Municipality
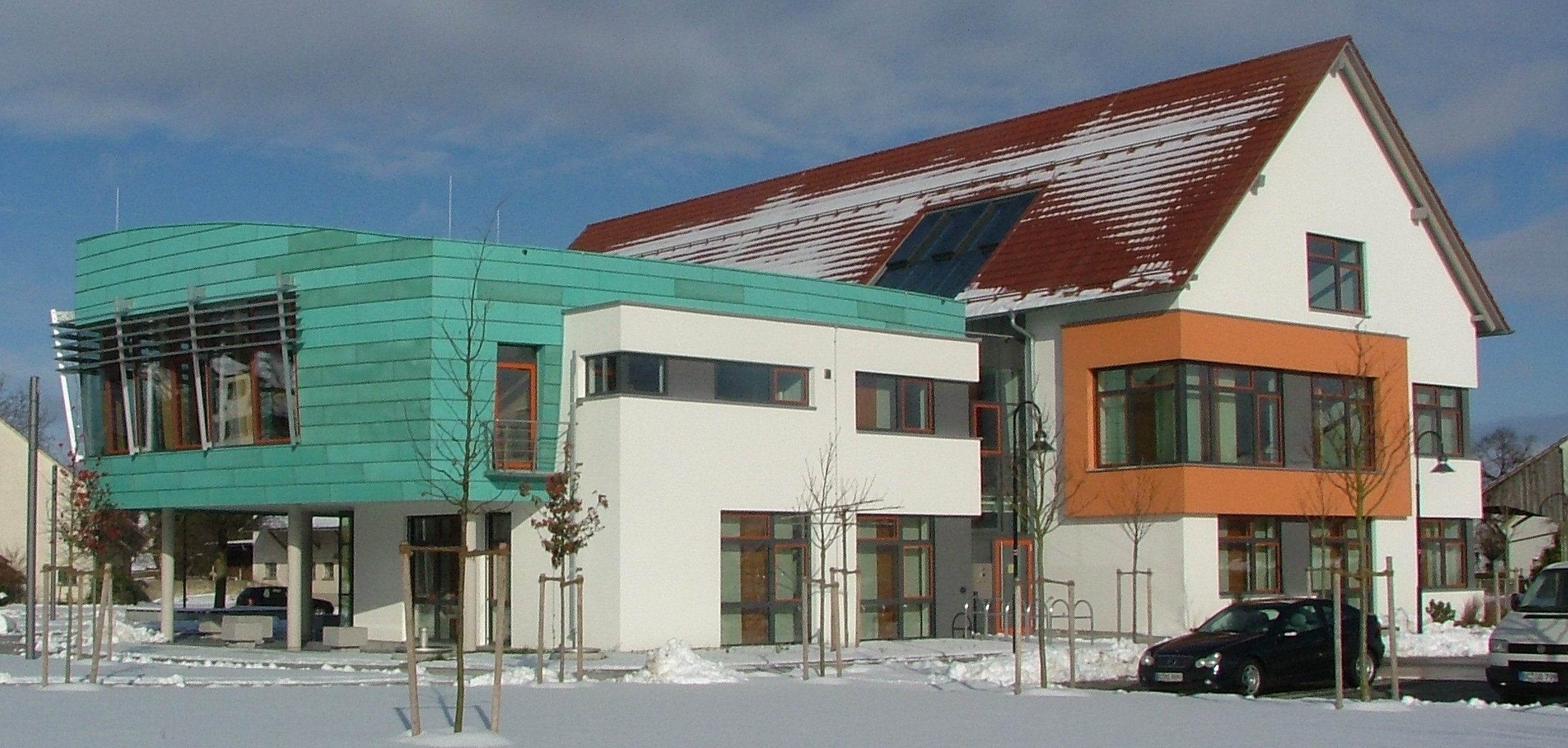
- Town hall of Kirchdorf an der Iller in 2009

- Coat of arms

- Location of Kirchdorf an der Iller within Biberach district
- Interactive map of Kirchdorf an der Iller
- Location within Germany Location within Baden-Württemberg
- Coordinates: 48°4′30″N 10°7′46″E
- Country: Germany
- State: Baden-Württemberg
- Admin. region: Tübingen
- District: Biberach

Government
  - Mayor (2019–27): Rainer Langenbacher

Area
  - Total: 22.85 km^{2} (8.82 sq mi)
- Elevation: 551 m (1,808 ft)

Population (2025-12-31)
  - Total: 4,038
  - Density: 176.7/km^{2} (457.7/sq mi)
- Time zone: UTC+01:00 (CET)
  - Summer (DST): UTC+02:00 (CEST)
- Postal codes: 88457
- Dialling codes: 07354
- Vehicle registration: BC
- Website: www.kirchdorf-iller.de

Kirchdorf an der Iller (German pronunciation: [ˈkɪʁçdɔʁf ʔan deːɐ̯ ˈʔɪlɐ], lit. 'Kirchdorf on the Iller') is a municipality in the district of Biberach in Baden-Württemberg in Germany.

== Geography ==
It is located in upper Swabia at the river Iller which forms the border to Bavaria.

== Demographics ==
Population development:

Year	Inhabitants
1990	2,690
2001	3,585
2011	3,440
2021	3,960

== Notable citizens ==
- Hans Liebherr (1915–1993), founder of Liebherr Group
