= List of flag bearers for Saudi Arabia at the Olympics =

Saudi Arabia at the Olympics
- IOC code: KSA
- NOC: Saudi Arabian Olympic Committee
- Website: olympic.sa (in Arabic and English)
- Medals: Gold 0 Silver 2 Bronze 2 Total 4

Summer appearances
- 1972; 1976; 1980; 1984; 1988; 1992; 1996; 2000; 2004; 2008; 2012; 2016; 2020; 2024

Winter appearances
- 2022; 2026

This is a list of flag bearers who have represented Saudi Arabia at the Olympics.

Flag bearers carry the national flag of their country at the opening ceremony of the Olympic Games.

#	Event year	Season	Flag bearer	Sport	Ref.
1	1972	Summer	Bilal Said Al-Azma	Athletics	
2	1976	Summer	Kamil Al-Abbasi	Athletics	
3	1984	Summer	Safaq Al-Anzi	Shooting	
4	1988	Summer	Salah Al-Mar	Official	
5	1992	Summer	Medhadi Al-Dosari	Cycling	
6	1996	Summer	Khaled Al-Khalidi	Athletics	
7	2000	Summer	Khaled Al-Dosari	Taekwondo	
8	2004	Summer	Hadi Soua'an Al-Somaily	Athletics	
9	2008	Summer	Mohammed Al-Khuwaildi	Athletics	
10	2012	Summer	Sultan Mubarak Al-Dawoodi	Athletics	
11	2016	Summer	Sulaiman Hamad	Judo	
12	2020	Summer	Yasmeen Al-Dabbagh	Athletics	
12	2020	Summer	Husein Alireza	Rowing	
13	2022	Winter	Fayik Abdi	Alpine skiing	
14	2024	Summer	Dunya Ali M Abutaleb	Taekwondo	
14	2024	Summer	Ramzy Al-Duhami	Equestrian	

== See also ==
- Saudi Arabia at the Olympics
