= Al-Dosari =

Al-Dosari (Arabic: الدوسري) is an Arabic surname. It may refer to:

- Abdullah Al-Dosari (born 1969), Saudi Arabian footballer
- Abdullah Jumaan Al-Dosari (born 1977), Saudi Arabian footballer
- Ghanem al-Dosari (born 1980), London-based Saudi human rights activist
- Hamad Mubarak Al-Dosari (born 1977), Qatari hurdler
- Khamis Al-Dosari (1973–2020), Saudi Arabian footballer
- Medhadi Al-Dosari (born 1976), Saudi Arabian former cyclist
- Mohamed Jaman Al-Dosari (born 1946), Saudi Arabian sprinter
- Mohammed al-Dosari (born 1961), Saudi Arabian runner
- Nassar Al-Dosari (born 1965), Saudi Arabian fencer
- Noora bint Hathal Al Dosari, Qatari princess
- Obeid Al-Dosari (born 1975), Saudi Arabian footballer
- Rashid Al-Dosari (born 1980), Bahraini footballer
- Rashid Shafi Al-Dosari (born 1981), Qatari track and field athlete
- Saad Al-Dosari (1977–2004), Saudi Arabian footballer
- Said Khalil Al-Dosari (born 1948), Saudi Arabian sprinter
- Saleh Al-Dosari (born 1987), Saudi Arabian footballer
- Saud al-Dosari (1971–2015), Saudi television presenter
- Youssef Al-Dosari (born 1962), Saudi Arabian hurdler
- Khalid Al-Dosari (born 1979), Qatari Poet

== See also ==
- Dawasir, an Arabian bedouin tribal confederation originating from central Arabia
