= Saudi Arabia at the 1992 Summer Olympics =

- Flag of Saudi Arabia
- IOC code: KSA
- NOC: Saudi Arabian Olympic Committee

in Barcelona
- Competitors: 9 in 5 sports
- Flag bearer: Medhadi Al-Dosari
- Medals: Gold 0 Silver 0 Bronze 0 Total 0

Summer Olympics appearances (overview)
- 1972; 1976; 1980; 1984; 1988; 1992; 1996; 2000; 2004; 2008; 2012; 2016; 2020; 2024

Saudi Arabia competed at the 1992 Summer Olympics in Barcelona, Spain. Nine competitors, all men, took part in thirteen events in five sports.

== Competitors ==
The following is the list of number of competitors in the Games.

Sport	Men	Women	Total
Athletics	2	0	2
Cycling	3	0	3
Fencing	1	0	1
Swimming	2	0	2
Table tennis	1	0	1
Total	9	0	9

== Athletics ==
Men's Discus Throw

- Khaled Al-Khalidi

- Qualification – 47.96 m (→ did not advance)

Men's Shot Put

- Khaled Al-Khalidi

- Qualification – 17.72 m (→ did not advance)

== Cycling ==
Three cyclists represented Saudi Arabia in 1992.

Men's road race

- Medhadi Al-Dosari
- Saleh Al-Qobaissi
- Mohamed Al-Takroni

Men's team time trial

- Medhadi Al-Dosari
- Saleh Al-Qobaissi
- Mohamed Al-Takroni

== Fencing ==
One fencer represented Saudi Arabia in 1992.

Men's sabre

- Sami Al-Baker
