= Saudi Arabia at the 2000 Summer Olympics =

- Flag of Saudi Arabia
- IOC code: KSA
- NOC: Saudi Arabian Olympic Committee
- Website: olympic.sa (in Arabic and English)

in Sydney
- Flag bearer: Khaled Al-Dosari
- Medals Ranked 61st: Gold 0 Silver 1 Bronze 1 Total 2

Summer Olympics appearances (overview)
- 1972; 1976; 1980; 1984; 1988; 1992; 1996; 2000; 2004; 2008; 2012; 2016; 2020; 2024

Saudi Arabia was represented at the 2000 Summer Olympics in Sydney, New South Wales, Australia by the Saudi Arabian Olympic Committee.

In total, 18 athletes – all men – represented Saudi Arabia in five different sports including athletics, equestrian, shooting, swimming and taekwondo.

Saudi Arabia won two medals at the games – the first Olympics ever won by Saudi Arabian athletes – after Hadi Souan Somayli claimed silver in the men's 400 metres hurdles and Khaled Al-Eid won bronze in the equestrian individual jumping.

== Competitors ==
In total, 18 athletes represented Saudi Arabia at the 2000 Summer Olympics in Sydney, New South Wales, Australia across five different sports.

Sport	Men	Women	Total
Athletics	11	0	11
Equestrian	4	0	4
Shooting	1	0	1
Swimming	1	0	1
Taekwondo	1	0	1
Total	18	0	18

== Medalists ==
Saudi Arabia won two medals at the games – the first Olympics ever won by Saudi Arabian athletes – after Hadi Souan Somayli claimed silver in the men's 400 metres hurdles and Khaled Al-Eid won bronze in the equestrian individual jumping.

Medal	Name	Sport	Event
Silver	Hadi Souan Somayli	Athletics	Men's 400 metres hurdles
Bronze	Khaled Al-Eid	Equestrian	Individual jumping

== Athletics ==
In total, 11 Saudi Arabian athletes participated in the athletics events – Jamal Al-Saffar in the men's 100 m and the men's 4 x 100 m relay, Salem Al-Yami in the men's 200 m and the men's 4 x 100 m relay, Hamdan Al-Bishi in the men's 400 m and the men's 4 x 400 m relay, Mubarak Mubarak in the men's 110 m hurdles and the men's 4 x 100 m relay, Hadi Souan Somayli in the men's 400 m hurdles and the men's 4 x 400 m relay, Mohamed Al-Yami in the men's 4 x 100 m relay, Mohammed Albeshi and Hamed Al-Bishi in the men's 4 x 400 m relay, Hussein Al-Sabee in the men's long jump, Salem Al-Ahmadi in the men's triple jump and Ali Saleh Al-Jadani in the men's javelin throw.

Key

- Q = Qualified for the next round by position in race or, in field events, by achieving the automatic qualification target
- q = Qualified for the next round as a fastest loser or, in field events, by position without achieving the qualifying target

Men
Track and road events

Athlete	Event	Heat		Quarterfinal		Semifinal		Final	
Athlete	Event	Time	Rank	Time	Rank	Time	Rank	Time	Rank
Jamal Al-Saffar	100 m	10.75	74	Did not advance					
Salem Al-Yami	200 m	21.18	47	Did not advance					
Hamdan Al-Bishi	400 m	45.22	3 Q	45.35	7 Q	45.98	13	Did not advance	
Mubarak Ata Mubarak	110 m hurdles	DQ		Did not advance					
Hadi Soua'an Al-Somaily	400 m hurdles	49.28	4 Q	—N/a		48.14	1 Q	47.53	2nd place, silver medalist(s)
Mohamed Al-Yami; Mubarak Ata Mubarak; Salem Al-Yami; Jamal Al-Saffar	4 × 100 m relay	39.94	30	—N/a		Did not advance			
Hamed Al-Bishi; Hamdan Al-Bishi; Mohamed Hamed Al-Bishi; Hadi Soua'an Al-Somaily	4 × 400 m relay	3:09.57	27	—N/a		Did not advance			

Field events

Athlete	Event	Qualification		Final	
Athlete	Event	Result	Rank	Result	Rank
Hussain Al-Sabee	Long jump	7.94	18	Did not advance	
Salem Al-Ahmadi	Triple jump	15.99	32	Did not advance	
Ali Saleh Al-Jadani	Javelin throw	68.70	34	Did not advance	

== Equestrian ==
In total, four Saudi Arabian athletes participated in the equestrian events – Khaled Al-Eid, Kamal Bahamdan, Fahad Al-Geaid and Ramzy Al-Duhami in the Individual jumping.

=== Jumping ===
Athlete	Horse	Event	Qualification								Final				Total		Jump-off		
Athlete	Horse	Event	Round 1		Round 2			Round 3			Round A		Round B		Total		Jump-off		
Athlete	Horse	Event	Penalties	Rank	Penalties	Total	Rank	Penalties	Total	Rank	Penalties	Rank	Penalties	Rank	Penalties	Rank	Penalties	Time	Rank
Khaled Al-Eid	Khashm Al-Aan	Individual	4.50	6	4.00	8.50	7	0.00	8.50	3 Q	0.00	1 Q	4.00	5	4.00	1 JO	4.00	44.86	3rd place, bronze medalist(s)
Ramzy Al-Duhami	Saif Al-Adel	Individual	DNF																
Fahad Al-Geaid	National Guard	Individual	59.75	72	DNF														
Kamal Bahamdan	Chanel M2	Individual	31.50	70	29.25	60.75	72	17.50	78.25	65	Did not advance								

== Shooting ==
In total, one Saudi Arabian athlete participated in the shooting events – Saeed Al-Mutairi in the men's skeet.

Athlete	Event	Qualification		Final		Total	
Athlete	Event	Points	Rank	Points	Rank	Points	Rank
Saeed Al-Mutairi	Men's skeet	119	23	Did not advance			

== Swimming ==
In total, one Saudi Arabian athlete participated in the swimming events – Ahmad Al-Kudmani in the men's 100 m breaststroke.

Athlete	Event	Heat		Semifinal		Final	
Athlete	Event	Time	Rank	Time	Rank	Time	Rank
Ahmad Al-Kudmani	Men's 100 m breaststroke	1:06.07	57	Did not advance			

== Taekwondo ==
In total, one Saudi Arabian athletes participated in the taekwondo events – Khaled Al-Dosari in the men's +80 kg category.

Athlete	Event	Round of 16	Quarterfinals	Semifinals	Repechage 1	Repechage 2	Final / BM	
Athlete	Event	Opposition Result	Opposition Result	Opposition Result	Opposition Result	Opposition Result	Opposition Result	Rank
Khaled Al-Dosari	Men's +80 kg	Kim (KOR); L 0–5	Did not advance		Delgado (NCA); W 3–1	Castro (COL); W 3–2	Gentil (FRA); L KO	4
