= Saudi Arabia at the 2016 Summer Olympics =

- Flag of Saudi Arabia
- IOC code: KSA
- NOC: Saudi Arabian Olympic Committee
- Website: olympic.sa (in Arabic and English)

in Rio de Janeiro
- Competitors: 11 in 5 sports
- Flag bearer: Sulaiman Hamad
- Medals: Gold 0 Silver 0 Bronze 0 Total 0

Summer Olympics appearances (overview)
- 1972; 1976; 1980; 1984; 1988; 1992; 1996; 2000; 2004; 2008; 2012; 2016; 2020; 2024

Saudi Arabia competed at the 2016 Summer Olympics in Rio de Janeiro, Brazil, from 5 to 21 August 2016. This was the nation's eleventh appearance at the Summer Olympics.

The Saudi Arabian Olympic Committee sent a team of eleven athletes, seven men and four women, to compete in five different sports at the Olympics, doubling its female participation after two women attended the London Games four years earlier. Discus thrower Sultan Mubarak Al-Dawoodi, along with distance runners Moukhled Al-Outaibi and Sarah Attar, were the only Saudi Arabian athletes to have participated at the previous Games, with the rest of the field making their Olympic debut in Rio de Janeiro. Meanwhile, judoka Sulaiman Hamad (men's 66 kg) led the Saudi delegation as the flag bearer and team captain in the opening ceremony.

Saudi Arabia left Rio de Janeiro without a single Olympic medal, failing to reproduce its performance from the previous Games due to the absence of the equestrian jumping team.

== Athletics ==
Saudi Arabian athletes achieved qualifying standards in the following athletics events (up to a maximum of 3 athletes in each event):

Key

- Note–Ranks given for track events are within the athlete's heat only
- Q = Qualified for the next round
- q = Qualified for the next round as a fastest loser or, in field events, by position without achieving the qualifying target
- NR = National record
- N/A = Round not applicable for the event
- Bye = Athlete not required to compete in round

Track & road events

Athlete	Event	Heat		Quarterfinal		Semifinal		Final	
Athlete	Event	Result	Rank	Result	Rank	Result	Rank	Result	Rank
Abdullah Abkar Mohammed	Men's 100 m	Bye		10.26	5	Did not advance			
Tariq Ahmed Al-Amri	Men's 5000 m	14:26.90	21	—N/a				Did not advance	
Moukhled Al-Outaibi	Men's 5000 m	14:18.48	21	—N/a				Did not advance	
Kariman Abuljadayel	Women's 100 m	14.61 NR	7	Did not advance					
Sarah Attar	Women's marathon	—N/a						3:16:11	132

Field events

Athlete	Event	Qualification		Final	
Athlete	Event	Distance	Position	Distance	Position
Sultan Mubarak Al-Dawoodi	Men's discus throw	54.34	33	Did not advance	

== Fencing ==
Saudi Arabia entered one fencer into the Olympic competition, returning to the sport for the first time since 1992. Lubna Al-Omair was given an exceptional additional quota place by the "universality clause", promoting equality in the Olympics.

Athlete	Event	Round of 64	Round of 32	Round of 16	Quarterfinal	Semifinal	Final / BM	
Athlete	Event	Opposition Score	Opposition Score	Opposition Score	Opposition Score	Opposition Score	Opposition Score	Rank
Lubna Al-Omair	Women's foil	Rochel (BRA); L 0–15	Did not advance					

== Judo ==
Saudi Arabia qualified one judoka for each of the following two classes at the Games. Sulaiman Hamad (men's 66 kg) earned a continental quota spot from the Asian region, as Saudi Arabia's top-ranked judoka outside of direct qualifying position in the IJF World Ranking List of May 30, 2016. Meanwhile, Wujud Fahmi (women's 52 kg) received an exceptional additional quota place under the "universality clause" by the International Olympic Committee.

Fahmi was accused by Israeli media of purposely forfeiting her match in order to avoid competing against Israeli judoka Gili Cohen in the second round. Fahmi, Saudi Arabia's news agency Al Arabiya, and the Saudi Olympic delegation said that Fahmi forfeited because she received injuries to her hands and feet in training. However, other media outlets, such as Israel Channel 2, reported she was not injured. Jim Nieto, the martial arts instructor who coached her before the Olympics, said it seemed fishy that she, after taking part in the Opening Ceremony, was reportedly injured so close to her fight date, because top competitors generally don't fight the day before their competition. He said "I feel sorry for her. Let her fight — even if she lasts 10 seconds. She busted her butt for almost a year to get there."

Athlete	Event	Round of 64	Round of 32	Round of 16	Quarterfinals	Semifinals	Repechage	Final / BM	
Athlete	Event	Opposition Result	Opposition Result	Opposition Result	Opposition Result	Opposition Result	Opposition Result	Opposition Result	Rank
Sulaiman Hamad	Men's −66 kg	Bye	Davaadorj (MGL); L 000–100	Did not advance					
Joud Fahmy	Women's −52 kg	—N/a	Legentil (MRI); L 000–100	Did not advance					

== Shooting ==
Saudi Arabia qualified one shooter in the men's pistol events by virtue of his best finish at the 2016 Asian Olympic Qualifying Tournament in New Delhi, India, as long as he obtained a minimum qualifying score (MQS) by March 31, 2016.

Athlete	Event	Qualification		Final	
Athlete	Event	Points	Rank	Points	Rank
Atallah Al-Anazi	Men's 10 m air pistol	573	32	Did not advance	
Atallah Al-Anazi	Men's 50 m pistol	550	20	Did not advance	

Qualification Legend: Q = Qualify for the next round; q = Qualify for the bronze medal (shotgun)

== Weightlifting ==
Saudi Arabia qualified one male weightlifter for the Rio Olympics by virtue of a top seven national finish at the 2016 Asian Championships. The team was required to allocate this place by June 20, 2016.

Athlete	Event	Snatch		Clean & Jerk		Total	Rank
Athlete	Event	Result	Rank	Result	Rank	Total	Rank
Mohsen Al-Duhaylib	Men's −69 kg	135	20	162	17	297	17
