= Saudi Arabia at the 2020 Summer Olympics =

- Flag of Saudi Arabia
- IOC code: KSA
- NOC: Saudi Arabian Olympic Committee
- Website: olympic.sa (in Arabic and English)

in Tokyo, Japan July 23, 2021 – August 8, 2021
- Competitors: 33 in 9 sports
- Flag bearers (opening): Yasmeen Al-Dabbagh; Husein Alireza
- Flag bearer (closing): N/A
- Medals Ranked 77th: Gold 0 Silver 1 Bronze 0 Total 1

Summer Olympics appearances (overview)
- 1972; 1976; 1980; 1984; 1988; 1992; 1996; 2000; 2004; 2008; 2012; 2016; 2020; 2024; 2028

Saudi Arabia competed at the 2020 Summer Olympics in Tokyo. Originally scheduled to take place from 24 July to 9 August 2020, the Games were postponed to 23 July to 8 August 2021, because of the COVID-19 pandemic. It was the nation's twelfth appearance at the Summer Olympics.

== Medalists ==
Medal	Name	Sport	Event	Date
Silver	Tareg Hamedi	Karate	Men's +75 kg	August 7

== Competitors ==
The following is the list of number of competitors in the Games. Note that reserves in football are not counted:

Sport	Men	Women	Total
Athletics	1	1	2
Football	22	0	22
Judo	1	1	2
Karate	1	0	1
Rowing	1	0	1
Shooting	1	0	1
Swimming	1	0	1
Table tennis	1	0	1
Weightlifting	2	0	2
Total	31	2	33

== Athletics ==
Saudi Arabian athletes further achieved the entry standards, either by qualifying time or by world ranking, in the following track and field events (up to a maximum of 3 athletes in each event):

Key

- Note–Ranks given for track events are within the athlete's heat only
- Q = Qualified for the next round
- q = Qualified for the next round as a fastest loser or, in field events, by position without achieving the qualifying target
- NR = National record
- N/A = Round not applicable for the event
- Bye = Athlete not required to compete in round

Track & road events

Athlete	Event	Heat		Quarterfinal		Semifinal		Final	
Athlete	Event	Result	Rank	Result	Rank	Result	Rank	Result	Rank
Mazen Al-Yassin	Men's 400 m	45.16 PB	1 Q	—N/a		45.37	4	Did not advance	
Yasmeen Al-Dabbagh	Women's 100 m	13.34	9	Did not advance					

== Football ==
Summary

Key:

- A.E.T – After extra time.
- P – Match decided by penalty-shootout.

Team	Event	Group Stage				Quarterfinal	Semifinal	Final / BM	
Team	Event	Opposition Score	Opposition Score	Opposition Score	Rank	Opposition Score	Opposition Score	Opposition Score	Rank
Saudi Arabia men's	Men's tournament	Ivory Coast; L 1–2	Germany; L 2–3	Brazil; L 1–3	4	Did not advance			

=== Men's tournament ===
Saudi Arabia men's football team qualified for the Olympics by advancing to the final match of the 2020 AFC U-23 Championship in Thailand, marking the country's recurrence to the sport for the first time since Atlanta 1996.

Team roster

Saudi Arabia's 24-man preliminary squad was announced on 16 June 2021. The final squad was announced on 6 July 2021. Turki Al-Ammar withdrew injured and was replaced by Firas Al-Buraikan on 21 July.

Head coach: Saad Al-Shehri

No.	Pos.	Player	Date of birth (age)	Club
1	GK	Amin Bukhari	2 May 1997 (aged 24)	(Saudi Arabian Football Federation) Al-Ain
2	DF	Saud Abdulhamid	18 July 1999 (aged 22)	(Saudi Arabian Football Federation) Al-Ittihad
3	DF	Hamad Al-Yami	17 May 1999 (aged 22)	(Saudi Arabian Football Federation) Al-Qadsiah
4	DF	Abdulbasit Hindi	2 February 1997 (aged 24)	(Saudi Arabian Football Federation) Al-Ahli
5	DF	Abdulelah Al-Amri	15 January 1997 (aged 24)	(Saudi Arabian Football Federation) Al-Nassr
6	MF	Sami Al-Najei	7 February 1997 (aged 24)	(Saudi Arabian Football Federation) Al-Nassr
7	MF	Salman Al-Faraj* (captain)	1 August 1989 (aged 31)	(Saudi Arabian Football Federation) Al-Hilal
8	MF	Nasser Al-Omran	13 July 1997 (aged 24)	(Saudi Arabian Football Federation) Al-Shabab
9	FW	Abdullah Al-Hamdan	13 September 1999 (aged 21)	(Saudi Arabian Football Federation) Al-Hilal
10	MF	Salem Al-Dawsari*	19 August 1991 (aged 29)	(Saudi Arabian Football Federation) Al-Hilal
11	MF	Khalid Al-Ghannam	7 November 2000 (aged 20)	(Saudi Arabian Football Federation) Al-Nassr
12	GK	Mohammed Al Rubaie	14 August 1997 (aged 23)	(Saudi Arabian Football Federation) Al-Ahli
13	DF	Yasser Al-Shahrani*	25 May 1992 (aged 29)	(Saudi Arabian Football Federation) Al-Hilal
14	MF	Ali Al-Hassan	4 March 1997 (aged 24)	(Saudi Arabian Football Federation) Al-Nassr
15	MF	Ayman Yahya	14 May 2001 (aged 20)	(Saudi Arabian Football Federation) Al-Nassr
16	DF	Khalifah Al-Dawsari	2 January 1999 (aged 22)	(Saudi Arabian Football Federation) Al-Qadsiah
17	MF	Ayman Al-Khulaif	22 May 1997 (aged 24)	(Saudi Arabian Football Federation) Al-Wehda
18	MF	Abdulrahman Ghareeb	31 March 1997 (aged 24)	(Saudi Arabian Football Federation) Al-Ahli
19	FW	Firas Al-Buraikan	14 May 2000 (aged 21)	(Saudi Arabian Football Federation) Al-Nassr
20	MF	Mukhtar Ali	30 October 1997 (aged 23)	(Saudi Arabian Football Federation) Al-Nassr
21	DF	Abdullah Hassoun	19 March 1997 (aged 24)	(Saudi Arabian Football Federation) Al-Ahli
22	GK	Zaid Al-Bawardi	26 January 1997 (aged 24)	(Saudi Arabian Football Federation) Al-Shabab

* Overage player.

Group play

Pos	Team	Pld	W	D	L	GF	GA	GD	Pts	Qualification
1	Brazil	3	2	1	0	7	3	+4	7	Advance to knockout stage
2	Ivory Coast	3	1	2	0	3	2	+1	5	Advance to knockout stage
3	Germany	3	1	1	1	6	7	−1	4	
4	Saudi Arabia	3	0	0	3	4	8	−4	0	

Source: TOCOG and FIFA
Rules for classification: Group stage tiebreakers
22 July 2021
17:30

Ivory Coast	2–1	Saudi Arabia
Al-Amri 39' (o.g.); Kessié 66'	Report (TOCOG); Report (FIFA)	Al-Dawsari 44'

International Stadium Yokohama, Yokohama
Referee: Matthew Conger (New Zealand)

25 July 2021
20:30

Saudi Arabia	2–3	Germany
Al-Najei 30', 50'	Report (TOCOG); Report (FIFA)	Amiri 11'; Ache 43'; Uduokhai 75'

International Stadium Yokohama, Yokohama
Referee: Victor Gomes (South Africa)

28 July 2021
17:00

Saudi Arabia	1–3	Brazil
Al-Amri 27'	Report (TOCOG); Report (FIFA)	Cunha 14'; Richarlison 76', 90+3'

Saitama Stadium 2002, Saitama
Referee: Bamlak Tessema Weyesa (Ethiopia)

== Judo ==
Saudi Arabia qualified two judoka for the men's lightweight category (73 kg) at the Games. Rio 2016 Olympian Sulaiman Hamad accepted a continental berth from Asia as the nation's top-ranked judoka outside of direct qualifying position in the IJF World Ranking List of June 28, 2021.

Athlete	Event	Round of 32	Round of 16	Quarterfinals	Semifinals	Repechage	Final / BM	
Athlete	Event	Opposition Result	Opposition Result	Opposition Result	Opposition Result	Opposition Result	Opposition Result	Rank
Sulaiman Hamad	Men's −73 kg	Margelidon (CAN); L 00–10	Did not advance					
Tahani Alqahtani	Women's +78 kg	Hershko (ISR); L 00–11	Did not advance					

== Karate ==
Saudi Arabia entered one karateka into the inaugural Olympic tournament. Tareg Hamedi qualified directly for the men's kumite +75 kg category by topping the final pool round at the 2021 World Olympic Qualification Tournament in Paris, France.

Athlete	Event	Group stage					Semifinals	Final	
Athlete	Event	Opposition Result	Opposition Result	Opposition Result	Opposition Result	Rank	Opposition Result	Opposition Result	Rank
Tareg Hamedi	Men's +75 kg	Kvesić (CRO); L 2–3	Irr (USA); W 4–1	Ganjzadeh (IRI); D 0–0	Gaysinsky (CAN); W 10–3	2 q	Araga (JPN); W 2–0	Ganjzadeh (IRI); L RSC	2nd place, silver medalist(s)

== Rowing ==
Saudi Arabia received an invitation from World Rowing to send a rower competing in the men's single sculls to the Games, as the next highest-ranked nation vying for qualification at the 2021 FISA Asia & Oceania Olympic Qualification Regatta in Tokyo, Japan.

Athlete	Event	Heats		Repechage		Quarterfinals		Semifinals		Final	
Athlete	Event	Time	Rank	Time	Rank	Time	Rank	Time	Rank	Time	Rank
Husein Alireza	Men's single sculls	7:54.18	5 R	8:06.78	2 QF	8:35.05	6 SC/D	7:53.99	6 FD	7:52.67	24

Qualification Legend: FA=Final A (medal); FB=Final B (non-medal); FC=Final C (non-medal); FD=Final D (non-medal); FE=Final E (non-medal); FF=Final F (non-medal); SA/B=Semifinals A/B; SC/D=Semifinals C/D; SE/F=Semifinals E/F; QF=Quarterfinals; R=Repechage

== Shooting ==
Saudi Arabia granted an invitation from ISSF to send four-time Olympian Saeed Al-Mutairi in the men's skeet shooting to the Olympics, as long as the minimum qualifying score (MQS) was fulfilled by June 6, 2021.

Athlete	Event	Qualification		Final	
Athlete	Event	Points	Rank	Points	Rank
Saeed Al-Mutairi	Men's skeet	119	22	Did not advance	

== Swimming ==
Saudi Arabia received a universality invitation from FINA to send a top-ranked male swimmer in his respective individual events to the Olympics, based on the FINA Points System of June 28, 2021.

Athlete	Event	Heat		Semifinal		Final	
Athlete	Event	Time	Rank	Time	Rank	Time	Rank
Yousif Bu Arish	Men's 100 m butterfly	56.29	55	Did not advance			

== Table tennis ==
Saudi Arabia entered one athlete into the table tennis competition at the Games for the first time in 16 years. Ali Al-Khadrawi secured an outright berth in the men's singles with a gold-medal victory at the 2020 West Asia Olympic Qualification Tournament in Amman, Jordan.

Athlete	Event	Preliminary	Round 1	Round 2	Round 3	Round of 16	Quarterfinals	Semifinals	Final / BM	
Athlete	Event	Opposition Result	Opposition Result	Opposition Result	Opposition Result	Opposition Result	Opposition Result	Opposition Result	Opposition Result	Rank
Ali Al-Khadrawi	Men's singles	Bye	Jančařík (CZE); L 0–4	Did not advance						

== Weightlifting ==
Saudi Arabia entered one male weightlifter into the Olympic competition. Mahmoud Al-Humayd accepted a spare berth unused by the Tripartite Commission as the next highest-ranked weightlifter vying for qualification in the men's 73 kg category based on the IWF Absolute World Rankings.

Athlete	Event	Snatch		Clean & Jerk		Total	Rank
Athlete	Event	Result	Rank	Result	Rank	Total	Rank
Seraj Al-Saleem	Men's −61 kg	129	6	159	4	288	5
Mahmoud Al-Humayd	Men's −73 kg	141	12	165	13	306	12
