= Saudi Arabia at the Olympics =

- Flag of Saudi Arabia
- IOC code: KSA
- NOC: Saudi Arabian Olympic Committee
- Website: olympic.sa (in Arabic and English)
- Medals Ranked 123rd: Gold 0 Silver 2 Bronze 2 Total 4

Summer appearances
- 1972; 1976; 1980; 1984; 1988; 1992; 1996; 2000; 2004; 2008; 2012; 2016; 2020; 2024; 2028

Winter appearances
- 2022; 2026

Saudi Arabia has competed in 13 Summer Olympic Games. The nation first appeared in the 1972 Summer Olympics held in Munich, West Germany. The nation also made its debut at the Winter Olympic Games in the 2022 Winter Olympics held in Beijing, China.

== Women's participation in the Olympics ==
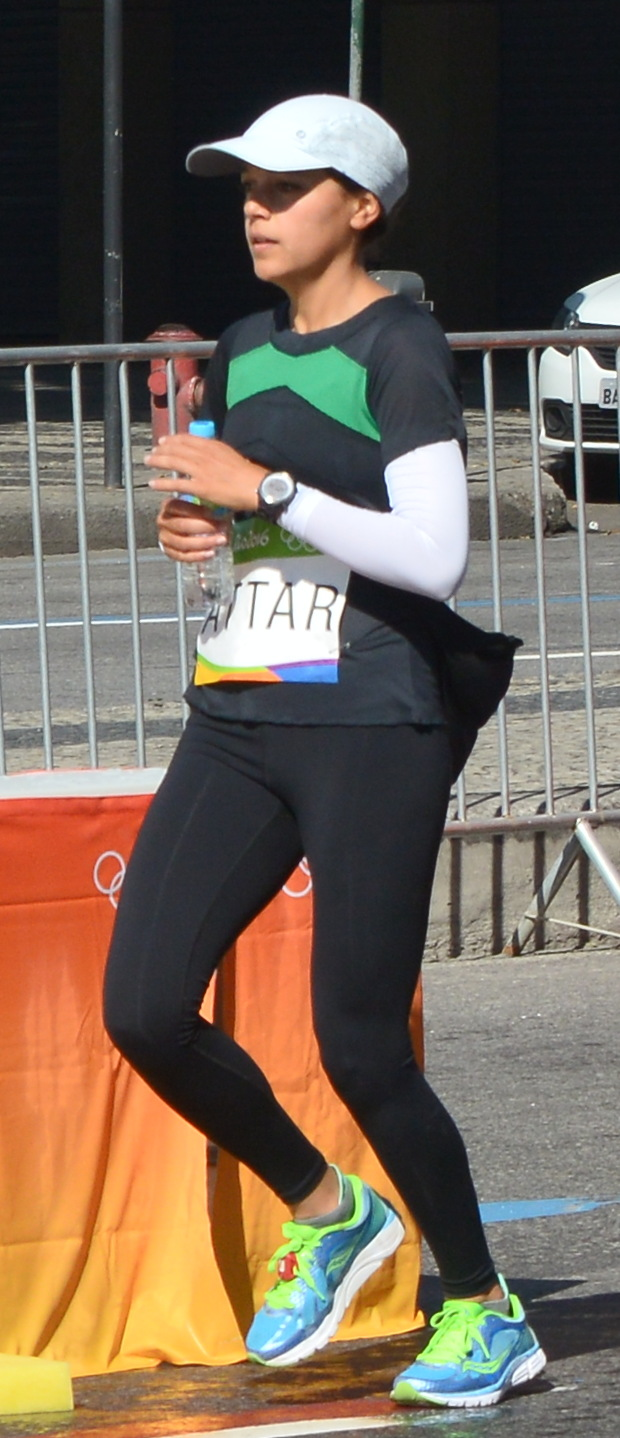
Sarah Attar is a track and field athlete who competed at the 2012 Summer Olympics as one of the first two female Olympians representing Saudi Arabia. She also competed in the marathon at the 2016 Olympics.

Prior to June 2012, Saudi Arabia banned female athletes from competing at the Olympics. However, following the International Olympic Committee pressuring the Saudi Olympic Committee to send female athletes to the 2012 Summer Olympics, in June 2012 the Saudi Embassy in London announced this had been agreed.

There were calls for Saudi Arabia to be barred from the Olympics until it permitted women to compete, notably from Anita DeFrantz, chair of the International Olympic Committee's Women and Sports Commission, in 2010. In 2008, Ali Al-Ahmed, director of the Institute for Gulf Affairs, likewise called for Saudi Arabia to be barred from the Games, describing its ban on women athletes as a violation of the International Olympic Committee charter. Stating that gender discrimination should be no more acceptable than racial discrimination, he noted: "For the last 15 years, many international nongovernmental organizations worldwide have been trying to lobby the IOC for better enforcement of its own laws banning gender discrimination. [...] While [its] efforts did result in increasing numbers of women Olympians, the IOC has been reluctant to take a strong position and threaten the discriminating countries with suspension or expulsion."

Dalma Rushdi Malhas competed at the 2010 Singapore Youth Olympics and won a bronze medal in equestrian (see Saudi Arabia at the 2010 Summer Youth Olympics). Saudi Arabia agreed on July 12, 2012, to send two women to compete in that year's Games in London, England: the two female athletes were Wojdan Shaherkani in judo, and 800-meter runner Sarah Attar.

== Medal tables ==
=== Medals by Summer Games ===
Games	Athletes	Gold	Silver	Bronze	Total	Rank
1972 Munich	10	0	0	0	0	–
1976 Montreal	19	0	0	0	0	–
1980 Moscow	boycotted					
1984 Los Angeles	39	0	0	0	0	–
1988 Seoul	9	0	0	0	0	–
1992 Barcelona	9	0	0	0	0	–
1996 Atlanta	32	0	0	0	0	–
2000 Sydney	18	0	1	1	2	61
2004 Athens	17	0	0	0	0	–
2008 Beijing	15	0	0	0	0	–
2012 London	18	0	0	1	1	79
2016 Rio de Janeiro	11	0	0	0	0	–
2020 Tokyo	33	0	1	0	1	77
2024 Paris	8	0	0	0	0	–
2028 Los Angeles	future event					
2032 Brisbane	future event					
Total		0	2	2	4	123

=== Medals by Winter Games ===
Games	Athletes	Gold	Silver	Bronze	Total	Rank
2022 Beijing	1	0	0	0	0	–
2026 Milano Cortina	2	0	0	0	0	–
2030 French Alps	future event					
2034 Utah	future event					
Total		0	0	0	0	–

=== Medals by summer sport ===
Sport	Gold	Silver	Bronze	Total
Athletics	0	1	0	1
Karate	0	1	0	1
Equestrian	0	0	2	2
Totals (3 entries)	0	2	2	4

== List of medalists ==
Medal	Name	Games	Sport	Event
Silver	Hadi Al-Somaily	2000 Sydney	Athletics	Men's 400 metre hurdles
Bronze	Khaled Al Eid	2000 Sydney	Equestrian	Individual show jumping
Bronze	Ramzy Al Duhami; Abdullah Al Saud; Kamal Bahamdan; Abdullah Sharbatly	2012 London	Equestrian	Team jumping
Silver	Tareg Hamedi	2020 Tokyo	Karate	Men's +75 kg

== See also ==
- List of flag bearers for Saudi Arabia at the Olympics
- Saudi Arabia at the Paralympics
