= Saudi Arabia at the 2012 Summer Olympics =

- Flag of Saudi Arabia
- IOC code: KSA
- NOC: Saudi Arabian Olympic Committee
- Website: olympic.sa (in Arabic and English)

in London
- Competitors: 19 in 5 sports
- Flag bearers: Sultan Mubarak Al-Dawoodi (opening); Yousef Ahmed Masrahi (closing)
- Medals Ranked 79th: Gold 0 Silver 0 Bronze 1 Total 1

Summer Olympics appearances (overview)
- 1972; 1976; 1980; 1984; 1988; 1992; 1996; 2000; 2004; 2008; 2012; 2016; 2020; 2024

Saudi Arabia competed at the 2012 Summer Olympics in London, from 27 July to 12 August 2012. This was the nation's tenth appearance at the Olympics, having participated in every edition of the Summer Games since their first appearance in 1972 with the exception of the 1980 Olympics in Moscow, because of its partial support to the United States boycott.

The Saudi Arabian Olympic Committee sent the nation's largest delegation to the Games after the 1996 Summer Olympics in Atlanta. Saudi Arabia also made a historic Olympic record by having two female athletes in the team for the first time, along with seventeen men competing in five different sports. Six athletes had competed in Beijing, including discus thrower Sultan Mubarak Al-Dawoodi, who became the nation's flag bearer at the opening ceremony.

Saudi Arabia left London with only a bronze medal, won by the equestrian team members Ramzy Al Duhami, Abdullah Al Saud, Kamal Bahamdan, and Abdullah Sharbatly in show jumping.

== Medalists ==
| Medal | Name | Sport | Event | Date |
|---|---|---|---|---|
| Bronze | Ramzy Al Duhami; Abdullah Al Saud; Kamal Bahamdan; Abdullah Sharbatly | Equestrian | Team jumping | 6 August |

== Female participation ==
In the previous games, Saudi Arabia had always sent exclusively male teams. Until recently, women's participation in sports was greatly restricted within the country, and Saudi Arabia did not permit women to compete in the Olympics. In June 2010, the International Olympic Committee said it would "press" Saudi Arabia (as well as Qatar and Brunei) to "send female athletes to the 2012 Olympic Games for the first time". Anita DeFrantz, chair of the IOC's Women and Sports Commission, suggested that the country should be barred from participating in the Olympics until it agreed to send women athletes to the Games. In July, Qatar announced that it would include women in its delegation to the 2012 Games, thus "increas[ing] pressure on Saudi Arabia" to do the same. The BBC remarked that "London 2012 may therefore see Saudi women Olympians for the first time. If not, it is conceivable the Kingdom may not be allowed to enter an all-male team".

Saudi Arabia did send one female competitor to the inaugural Summer Youth Olympics in Singapore in 2010. The International Olympic Committee had made it a requirement for every national delegation to include at least one female athlete. Dalma Rushdi Malhas, with her horse Flash Top Hat, took part in the individual jumping event in equestrian, and won a bronze medal, the country's only medal at those Games.

In November 2011, Al Arabiya reported that "Saudi Arabia plans to send a female equestrian team to the 2012 Summer Olympics in London to avoid being barred from taking part". Dalma Rushdi Malhas, it said, was likely to compete. I.O.C. spokeswoman Emmanuelle Moreau, however, indicated that the Committee "would not mandate that the Saudis [must] have female representation in London", arguing that "the I.O.C. does not give ultimatums nor deadlines but rather believes that a lot can be achieved through dialogue". An unnamed senior sports official anonymously told Associated Press that sports authorities wished to develop women's participation in sports, but that they were "fighting deeply entrenched traditions". It was also confirmed that the Saudi national Olympic Committee would not prevent Malhas from competing at the London Games. More specifically, she would be permitted to compete if she were invited to the Games by the I.O.C., but Saudi Arabia would not be inviting her to do so itself. Instead, the country was preparing to select four male riders to send to the equestrian competition. (The sixth fundamental principle of Olympism as defined by the Olympic Charters states that "Any form of discrimination [...] on grounds of race, religion, politics, gender or otherwise is incompatible with belonging to the Olympic Movement." The fourth principle states that "The practice of sport is a human right. Every individual must have the possibility of practising sport, without discrimination of any kind". The seventh principle states that "Belonging to the Olympic Movement requires compliance with the Olympic Charter".)

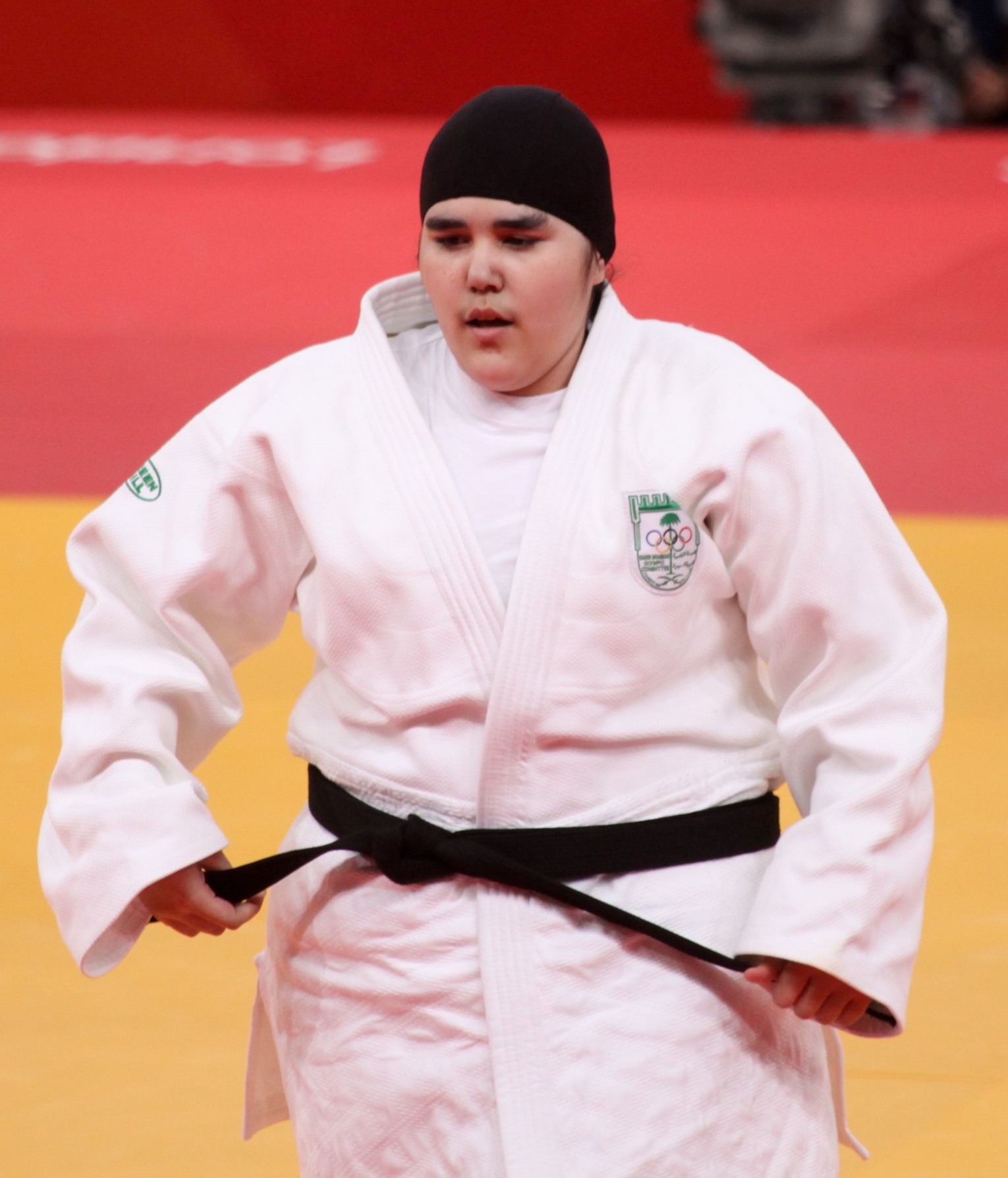
Wojdan Shaherkani at the 2012 London Olympics

In late June 2012, the country announced that it would permit women's participation, and that its Olympic Committee would "oversee participation of women athletes who can qualify". At the time, Malhas was "the only Saudi female competitor at Olympic standard", making it likely that she would be the only woman Saudi participant in the Games. The BBC described the decision as "a huge step, overturning deep-rooted opposition from those opposed to any public role for women". It noted that the change had been "led by King Abdullah, who has long been pushing for women to play a more active role in Saudi society". Malhas, however, stated she would not be able to compete in London, due to an injury her horse had suffered, but hoped to do so in 2016.

The IOC announced in mid-July 2012 that Saudi Arabia had entered two female athletes, Judoka Wojdan Shaherkani and 800m-runner Sarah Attar, to participate in the 2012 Olympics.

== Athletics ==
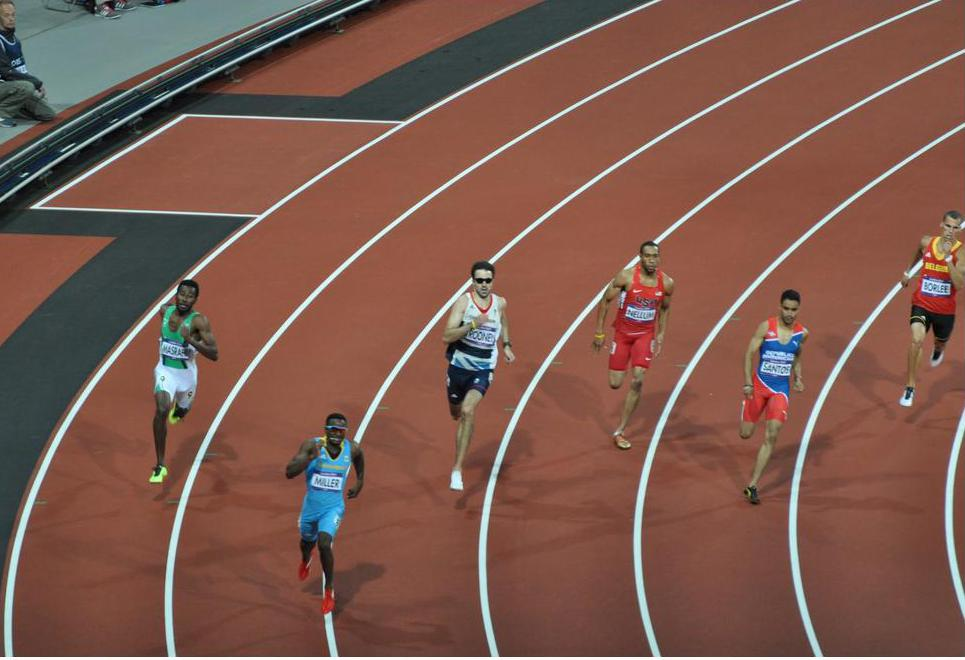
Yousef Ahmed Masrahi (outer left lane) of Saudi Arabia in the 400 m semi-finals at the 2012 London Olympics

Saudi athletes have so far achieved qualifying standards in the following athletics events (up to a maximum of 3 athletes in each event at the 'A' Standard, and 1 at the 'B' Standard):

Key

- Note–Ranks given for track events are within the athlete's heat only
- Q = Qualified for the next round
- q = Qualified for the next round as a fastest loser or, in field events, by position without achieving the qualifying target
- NR = National record
- N/A = Round not applicable for the event
- Bye = Athlete not required to compete in round

Men
Track & road events

| Athlete | Event | Heat | | Semifinal | | Final | |
| Athlete | Event | Result | Rank | Result | Rank | Result | Rank |
|---|---|---|---|---|---|---|---|
| Ali Ahmed Al-Amri | 3000 m steeplechase | 8:26.22 | 9 | —N/a | | did not advance | |
| Moukheld Al-Outaibi | 5000 m | 13:31.47 | 9 | —N/a | | did not advance | |
| Moukheld Al-Outaibi | 10000 m | —N/a | | | | 28:07.25 | 17 |
| Hussain Alhamdah | 5000 m | 14:00.43 | 19 | —N/a | | did not advance | |
| Abdullah Aljoud | 5000 m | 14:11.12 | 20 | —N/a | | did not advance | |
| Yousef Ahmed Masrahi | 400 m | 45.43 | 3 Q | 45.91 | 7 | did not advance | |
| Abdulaziz Mohammed | 800 m | 1:46.09 | 3 Q | 1:48.98 | 8 | did not advance | |
| Emad Noor | 1500 m | 3:42.29 | 9 | did not advance | | | |
| Mohammed Shaween | 1500 m | 3:39.42 | 1 Q | 3:43.39 | 7 | did not advance | |

Field events

| Athlete | Event | Qualification | | Final | |
| Athlete | Event | Distance | Position | Distance | Position |
|---|---|---|---|---|---|
| Sultan Mubarak Al-Dawoodi | Discus throw | 59.54 | 33 | did not advance | |

Women
Track & road events

| Athlete | Event | Heat | | Semifinal | | Final | |
| Athlete | Event | Result | Rank | Result | Rank | Result | Rank |
|---|---|---|---|---|---|---|---|
| Sarah Attar | 800 m | 2:44.95 | 8 | did not advance | | | |

== Equestrian ==
=== Jumping ===
Saudi Arabia has qualified a team.

| Athlete | Horse | Event | Qualification | | | | | | | | Final | | | | | Total | |
| Athlete | Horse | Event | Round 1 | | Round 2 | | | Round 3 | | | Round A | | Round B | | | Total | |
| Athlete | Horse | Event | Penalties | Rank | Penalties | Total | Rank | Penalties | Total | Rank | Penalties | Rank | Penalties | Total | Rank | Penalties | Rank |
|---|---|---|---|---|---|---|---|---|---|---|---|---|---|---|---|---|---|
| Ramzy Al-Duhami | Bayard | Individual | 2 | 41 Q | 0 | 2 | =15 Q | 4 | 6 | 9 Q | 12 | =29 | did not advance | | | 12 | 29 |
| Abdullah Al-Saud | Davos | Individual | 0 | =1 Q | 0 | 0 | =1 Q | 4 | 4 | =4 Q | 9 | =26 | did not advance | | | 9 | 26 |
| Kamal Bahamdan | Delphi | Individual | 1 | =33 Q | 1 | 2 | =15 Q | 5 | 7 | 10 Q | 1 | =7 Q | 1 | 2 | 4 | 2 | 4 |
| Abdullah Sharbatly | Sultan | Individual | 6 | =58 Q | 4 | 10 | 51 | did not advance | | | | | | | | 10 | 51 |
| Ramzy Al Duhami; Abdullah Al Saud; Kamal Bahamdan; Abdullah Sharbatly | See above | Team | —N/a | | | | | | | | 1 | 1 Q | 13 | 14 | 3 | 14 | 3rd place, bronze medalist(s) |

== Judo ==
Saudi Arabia has qualified 2 judoka.

| Athlete | Event | Round of 64 | Round of 32 | Round of 16 | Quarterfinals | Semifinals | Repechage | Final / BM | |
| Athlete | Event | Opposition Result | Opposition Result | Opposition Result | Opposition Result | Opposition Result | Opposition Result | Opposition Result | Rank |
|---|---|---|---|---|---|---|---|---|---|
| Eisa Majrashi | Men's −60 kg | Bye | Lall (GUY); W 0100–0000 | Kitadai (BRA); L 0000–0021 | did not advance | | | | |
| Wojdan Shahrkhani | Women's +78 kg | —N/a | Mojica (PUR); L 0000–0100 | did not advance | | | | | |

== Shooting ==
Men

| Athlete | Event | Qualification | | Final | |
| Athlete | Event | Points | Rank | Points | Rank |
|---|---|---|---|---|---|
| Majed Al-Tamimi | Skeet | 111 | 29 | did not advance | |

== Weightlifting ==
Saudi Arabia has qualified the following quota places.

| Athlete | Event | Snatch | | Clean & Jerk | | Total | Rank |
| Athlete | Event | Result | Rank | Result | Rank | Total | Rank |
|---|---|---|---|---|---|---|---|
| Abbas Al-Qaisoum | Men's −94 kg | 155 | 15 | 180 | 17 | 335 | 15 |

== See also ==
- Saudi Arabia at the 2012 Summer Paralympics
