= Saudi Arabia at the 2004 Summer Olympics =

- Flag of Saudi Arabia
- IOC code: KSA
- NOC: Saudi Arabian Olympic Committee
- Website: olympic.sa (in Arabic and English)

in Athens
- Competitors: 17 in 6 sports
- Flag bearer: Hadi Soua'an Al-Somaily
- Medals: Gold 0 Silver 0 Bronze 0 Total 0

Summer Olympics appearances (overview)
- 1972; 1976; 1980; 1984; 1988; 1992; 1996; 2000; 2004; 2008; 2012; 2016; 2020; 2024; 2028

Saudi Arabia competed at the 2004 Summer Olympics in Athens, Greece, from 13 to 29 August 2004.

== Athletics ==
Saudi Arabian athletes have so far achieved qualifying standards in the following athletics events (up to a maximum of 3 athletes in each event at the 'A' Standard, and 1 at the 'B' Standard).

Key

- Note–Ranks given for track events are within the athlete's heat only
- Q = Qualified for the next round
- q = Qualified for the next round as a fastest loser or, in field events, by position without achieving the qualifying target
- NR = National record
- N/A = Round not applicable for the event
- Bye = Athlete not required to compete in round

Men
Track & road events

| Athlete | Event | Heat | | Quarterfinal | | Semifinal | | Final | |
| Athlete | Event | Result | Rank | Result | Rank | Result | Rank | Result | Rank |
|---|---|---|---|---|---|---|---|---|---|
| Hamed Al-Bishi | 200 m | DNS | | Did not advance | | | | | |
| Hamdan Al-Bishi | 400 m | 45.31 | 2 Q | —N/a | | 45.59 | 5 | Did not advance | |
| Ibrahim Al-Hamaidi | 400 m hurdles | 49.64 | 5 | —N/a | | Did not advance | | | |
| Mohammed Al-Salhi | 800 m | 1:48.42 | 6 | —N/a | | Did not advance | | | |
| Hadi Soua'an Al-Somaily | 400 m hurdles | 49.15 | 4 Q | —N/a | | 48.98 | 5 | Did not advance | |
| Salem Mubarak Al-Yami | 100 m | 10.36 | 4 | Did not advance | | | | | |
| Mubarak Ata Mubarak | 110 m hurdles | 13.81 | 7 | Did not advance | | | | | |

Field events

| Athlete | Event | Qualification | | Final | |
| Athlete | Event | Distance | Position | Distance | Position |
|---|---|---|---|---|---|
| Salem Mouled Al-Ahmadi | Triple jump | 16.16 | 35 | Did not advance | |

== Equestrian ==
=== Show jumping ===
| Athlete | Horse | Event | Qualification | | | | | | | | Final | | | | | Total | |
| Athlete | Horse | Event | Round 1 | | Round 2 | | | Round 3 | | | Round A | | Round B | | | Total | |
| Athlete | Horse | Event | Penalties | Rank | Penalties | Total | Rank | Penalties | Total | Rank | Penalties | Rank | Penalties | Total | Rank | Penalties | Rank |
|---|---|---|---|---|---|---|---|---|---|---|---|---|---|---|---|---|---|
| Ramzy Al-Duhami | Fall Khaeer | Individual | 9 | =54 | 17 | 26 | =55 Q | 28 | 54 | 57 | Did not advance | | | | | | |
| Kamal Bahamdan | Casita | Individual | 12 | =60 | 12 | 24 | 53 Q | 12 | 36 | 50 Q | 25 | 45 | Did not advance | | | | |

== Shooting ==
Men

| Athlete | Event | Qualification | | Final | |
| Athlete | Event | Points | Rank | Points | Rank |
|---|---|---|---|---|---|
| Saied Al-Mutairi | Skeet | 120 | =15 | Did not advance | |

== Swimming ==
Men

| Athlete | Event | Heat | | Semifinal | | Final | |
| Athlete | Event | Time | Rank | Time | Rank | Time | Rank |
|---|---|---|---|---|---|---|---|
| Ahmed Al-Kudmani | 100 m breaststroke | 1:05.65 | =47 | Did not advance | | | |

== Table tennis ==
| Athlete | Event | Round 1 | Round 2 | Round 3 | Round 4 | Quarterfinals | Semifinals | Final / BM | |
| Athlete | Event | Opposition Result | Opposition Result | Opposition Result | Opposition Result | Opposition Result | Opposition Result | Opposition Result | Rank |
|---|---|---|---|---|---|---|---|---|---|
| Khalid Al-Harbi | Men's singles | Karakašević (SCG); L 0–4 | Did not advance | | | | | | |

== Weightlifting ==
Four Saudi Arabian weightlifters qualified for the following events:

| Athlete | Event | Snatch | | Clean & Jerk | | Total | Rank |
| Athlete | Event | Result | Rank | Result | Rank | Total | Rank |
|---|---|---|---|---|---|---|---|
| Abdulmohsen Al-Bagir | Men's −69 kg | 127.5 | 14 | 160 | =10 | 287.5 | 12 |
| Jafar Al-Bagir | Men's −69 kg | ~~135~~ | DNF | — | — | — | DNF |
| Ramzi Al-Mahrous | Men's −94 kg | 150 | 20 | ~~190~~ | DNF | 150 | DNF |
| Najim Al-Radwan | Men's −94 kg | ~~162.5~~ | DNF | — | — | — | DNF |

== See also ==
- Saudi Arabia at the 2002 Asian Games
- Saudi Arabia at the 2004 Summer Paralympics
