= Saudi Arabia at the 1996 Summer Olympics =

- Flag of Saudi Arabia
- IOC code: KSA
- NOC: Saudi Arabian Olympic Committee
- Website: olympic.sa (in Arabic and English)

in Atlanta
- Competitors: 29 in 5 sports
- Flag bearer: Khaled Al-Khalidi
- Medals: Gold 0 Silver 0 Bronze 0 Total 0

Summer Olympics appearances (overview)
- 1972; 1976; 1980; 1984; 1988; 1992; 1996; 2000; 2004; 2008; 2012; 2016; 2020; 2024

Saudi Arabia competed at the 1996 Summer Olympics in Atlanta, United States.

== Results by event ==
=== Athletics ===
Men's 5,000 metres

- Alyan al-Qahtani

- Qualification — did not start (→ did not advance)

Men's 10,000 metres

- Alyan Al-Qahtani

- Qualification — did not finish (→ did not advance)

Men's 4 × 400 m Relay

- Saleh al-Saydan, Mohammed al-Beshi, Hashim al-Sharfa, and Hadi Souan Somayli

- Heat — 3:04.67
- Semi Final — 3:07.18 (→ did not advance)

Men's 400m Hurdles

- Hadi Souan Somayli

- Heat — 49.94s (→ did not advance)

Men's 3,000 metres Steeplechase

- Ibrahim Al-Asiri Yahya

- Heat — 8:46.37 (→ did not advance)
