= Saudi Arabia at the 2008 Summer Olympics =

- Flag of Saudi Arabia
- IOC code: KSA
- NOC: Saudi Arabian Olympic Committee
- Website: olympic.sa (in Arabic and English)

in Beijing
- Competitors: 15 in 5 sports
- Flag bearer: Mohamed Salman Al-Khuwalidi
- Medals: Gold 0 Silver 0 Bronze 0 Total 0

Summer Olympics appearances (overview)
- 1972; 1976; 1980; 1984; 1988; 1992; 1996; 2000; 2004; 2008; 2012; 2016; 2020; 2024; 2028

Saudi Arabia competed at the 2008 Summer Olympics in Beijing, China. As in years past, Saudi Arabia sent only male representatives to Beijing. The International Olympic Committee is reportedly pressuring the Saudi Olympic Committee to send female athletes to the 2012 Summer Olympics.

The 15 Saudi athletes competed in five sports: athletics, shooting, swimming, weightlifting and equestrian.

== Athletics ==
Key

- Note–Ranks given for track events are within the athlete's heat only
- Q = Qualified for the next round
- q = Qualified for the next round as a fastest loser or, in field events, by position without achieving the qualifying target
- NR = National record
- N/A = Round not applicable for the event
- Bye = Athlete not required to compete in round

Men
Track & road events

Athlete	Event	Heat		Semifinal		Final	
Athlete	Event	Result	Rank	Result	Rank	Result	Rank
Moukheld Al-Outaibi	5000 m	13:47.00	6	—N/a		Did not advance	
Mohammed Al-Salhi	800 m	1:47.02	2 Q	1:47.14	6	Did not advance	
Mohammed Othman Shaween	1500 m	3:45.82	10	Did not advance			
Ali Ahmad Al-Amri	3000 m steeplechase	9:09.73	13	—N/a		Did not advance	

Field events

Athlete	Event	Qualification		Final	
Athlete	Event	Distance	Position	Distance	Position
Sultan Mubarak Al-Dawoodi	Discus throw	56.29	34	Did not advance	
Mohamed Salman Al-Khuwalidi	Long jump	7.93	14	Did not advance	
Hussein Taher Al-Sabee	Long jump	8.04	8 q	7.80	11
Sultan Abdulmajeed Alhebshi	Shot put	19.51	27	Did not advance	

== Equestrian ==
=== Show jumping ===
Athlete	Horse	Event	Qualification								Final					Total	
Athlete	Horse	Event	Round 1		Round 2			Round 3			Round A		Round B			Total	
Athlete	Horse	Event	Penalties	Rank	Penalties	Total	Rank	Penalties	Total	Rank	Penalties	Rank	Penalties	Total	Rank	Penalties	Rank
Ramzy Al Duhami	Allah Jabek	Individual	2	28	5	7	15 Q	9	16	18 Q	8	23	Did not advance			8	23
Abdullah Al Saud	Obelix	Individual	10	56	30	40	60	Did not advance								40	60
Faisal Al Shalan	Wido	Individual	11	61	16	29	58	Did not advance								29	58
Kamal Bahamdan	Rivaal	Individual	11	61	12	26	54	Did not advance								26	54
Ramzy Al Duhami; Abdullah Al Saud; Faisal Al Shalan; Kamal Bahamdan	See above	Team	—N/a								38	13	Did not advance			38	13

== Shooting ==
Men

Athlete	Event	Qualification		Final	
Athlete	Event	Points	Rank	Points	Rank
Saied Al-Mutairi	Skeet	104	39	Did not advance	

== Swimming ==
Men

Athlete	Event	Heat		Semifinal		Final	
Athlete	Event	Result	Rank	Result	Rank	Result	Rank
Bader Abdulrahman Almuhana	100 m butterfly	55.59	61	Did not advance			

== Weightlifting ==
Athlete	Event	Snatch		Clean & Jerk		Total	Rank
Athlete	Event	Result	Rank	Result	Rank	Total	Rank
Ali Hussein Aldhilab	Men's −69 kg	Did not compete					
