= Saudi Arabia at the 1972 Summer Olympics =

- Flag of Saudi Arabia
- IOC code: KSA (ARS used at these Games)
- NOC: Saudi Arabian Olympic Committee

in Munich
- Competitors: 6
- Flag bearer: Bilal Said Al-Azma
- Medals: Gold 0 Silver 0 Bronze 0 Total 0

Summer Olympics appearances (overview)
- 1972; 1976; 1980; 1984; 1988; 1992; 1996; 2000; 2004; 2008; 2012; 2016; 2020; 2024

Saudi Arabia competed in the Olympic Games for the first time at the 1972 Summer Olympics in Munich, West Germany.

== Results by events ==
=== Athletics ===
Men's 100 metres

- Mansour Farhan Al-Gegd

- First Heat — 11.23s (→ did not advance)

Men's 1500 metres

- Naser Al-Safraa

- Heat — 4:14.5 (→ did not advance)

Men's 5000 metres

- Abdallah Rouei Al-Mabrouk

- Heat — 13:51.0 (→ did not advance)

Men's 4 × 100 m Relay

- Mohamed Al-Dosary, Mansour Farhan Al-Gegd, Bilal Said, and Saad Khalil Al-Dosary

- Heat — 43.35s (→ did not advance)

Men's javelin throw

- Abdul Atif Al-Qahtani

- Qualification — 53.06 m (→ did not advance)
