= Saudi Arabia at the 1976 Summer Olympics =

- Flag of Saudi Arabia
- IOC code: KSA (ARS used at these Games)
- NOC: Saudi Arabian Olympic Committee

in Montreal
- Competitors: 19
- Medals: Gold 0 Silver 0 Bronze 0 Total 0

Summer Olympics appearances (overview)
- 1972; 1976; 1980; 1984; 1988; 1992; 1996; 2000; 2004; 2008; 2012; 2016; 2020; 2024; 2028

Saudi Arabia competed at the 1976 Summer Olympics in Montreal, Quebec, Canada.

== Results by event ==
=== Athletics ===
Men's 800 metres

- Ateyah El-Khashaami

- Heat — 1:57.67 (→ did not advance)

Men's 1,500 metres

- Sheikr Al-Shabani

- Heat — 4:08.70 (→ did not advance)

Men's 5,000 metres

- Shetwy Al-Bishy

- Heat — did not start (→ did not advance, no ranking)

Men's 10,000 metres

- Raga Al-Shalawi

- Heat — did not finish (→ did not advance)

Men's 4×100 metres Relay

- Mohammed Sehly, Ali Al-Malky, Salem Khalifa, and Hamed Ali

- Heat — 42.00s (→ did not advance)

Men's 4×400 metres Relay

- Kamil Al-Abbasi, Hamed Ali, Ahmed Asiry, and Hassan Masallam

- Heat — 3:17.53 (→ did not advance)

Men's 400m Hurdles

- Kamil Al-Abbasi

- Heat — 55.00s (→ did not advance)

Men's High Jump

- Ghazi Saleh

- Qualification — NM (→ did not advance)

Men's Discus Throw

- Mahmoud Al-Zabramawi

- Qualification — 35.94m (did not advance)
