= Saudi Arabia at the 2026 Winter Olympics =

- Flag of Saudi Arabia
- IOC code: KSA
- NOC: Saudi Arabian Olympic Committee
- Website: olympic.sa (in Arabic and English)

in Milan and Cortina d'Ampezzo, Italy 6 February 2026 – 22 February 2026
- Competitors: 2 (2 men) in 2 sports
- Flag bearer (opening): Rakan Alireza
- Flag bearer (closing): Volunteer
- Medals: Gold 0 Silver 0 Bronze 0 Total 0

Winter Olympics appearances (overview)
- 2022; 2026

Saudi Arabia competed at the 2026 Winter Olympics in Milan and Cortina d'Ampezzo, Italy, from 6 to 22 February 2026.

Cross-country skier Rakan Alireza was the country's flagbearer during the opening ceremony. Meanwhile, a volunteer was the country's flagbearer during the closing ceremony.

== Competitors ==
The following is the list of number of competitors participating at the Games per sport/discipline.

Sport	Men	Women	Total
Alpine skiing	1	0	1
Cross-country skiing	1	0	1
Total	2	0	2

== Alpine skiing ==
Saudi Arabia qualified one male alpine skier through the basic quota.

Athlete	Event	Run 1		Run 2		Total	
Athlete	Event	Time	Rank	Time	Rank	Time	Rank
Fayik Abdi	Men's giant slalom	1:30.52	71	1:22.89	65	2:53.41	67
Fayik Abdi	Men's slalom	DNF					

== Cross-country skiing ==
Saudi Arabia qualified one male cross-country skier through the basic quota. This marked the country's debut in the sport at the Winter Olympics.

Distance

Athlete	Event	Final		
Athlete	Event	Time	Deficit	Rank
Rakan Alireza	Men's 10 km freestyle	31:04.0	+10:27.8	109
