= Alsayed Agazayerli =

Egyptian poet, writer and journalist

- Born: September 18, 1967 (age 58); Kafr El-Sheikh governorate
- Occupations: poet, journalist and writer
- Awards: The Supreme Council of Culture Award for Young Poets in 1993. The Central Prize of the Egyptian General Authority for Cultural Palaces in 1995. The Egyptian Creativity Award in the Kingdom of Saudi Arabia in 1995.

Alsayed Agazayerli (Arabic: السيد الجزايرلي) is an Egyptian poet, writer and journalist who has been working in the Saudi press since 1994. He is a member of the Egyptian Writers Union. He has made contributions in poetry, fiction, narration, theatre, cinema, and fine arts.

== Biography ==
Agazayerli was born on September 18, 1967, in the Kafr El-Sheikh governorate before moving to Alexandria in the late eighties and engaging in cultural life there. He started publishing his poems and literature and critical writings in 1986 in many Egyptian and Arab cultural magazines, most notably: ("Poetry" – "Ibdaa" – "New Culture" – "Al-Bayan" – "Al-Rafid" – "Bahrain" – "Al-Muntada"), and in many newspapers, most notably: ("Al-Ahram" – "Al-Jumhuriya" – "Al-Masaa" – “Akhbar Al-Adab” – “Al-Hayat” – “Asharq Al-Awsat” – “Riyadh” – Al-Madina...). During his work experience in the Saudi press, he worked for Al-Jazeera newspaper and Al-Youm newspaper. He managed a number of monthly and weekly magazines, where he worked as editor-in-chief and managing external offices in “Rotana” magazine, director of specialized publishing at Angham Publishing House, director of editorial at “Al-Mumayzon VIP” magazine, editor-in-chief at “Leilat Khamis” magazine, and editorial director in “Al Barez" magazine, and Director of the Media Consulting Project. Moreover, he worked as a supervisor of the Publications Unit in the General Department of Information and Relations at the Saudi Commission for Tourism and National Heritage (currently the Saudi Ministry of Tourism) from 2008 to 2021 and has been working since January 2021 at the King Faisal Center for Research and Islamic Studies in Riyadh, the capital of the Kingdom of Saudi Arabia.

== Contributions ==
He participated in many poetry evenings, in a number of jury committees for Fine Arts exhibitions, poetry and literature competitions, and in many seminars and cultural events that were held in academic and cultural institutions, including: the College of Art Education at King Saud University, the King Fahd Cultural Center, the Agency for Cultural Affairs at the Ministry of Culture and media, the Saudi Society for Culture and Arts, and the Bibliotheca Alexandrina. He worked at the Egyptian Cultural Center in Riyadh, and the Riyadh International Book Fair. He also participated in a series of television episodes for various channels in the fields of: media, criticism, Fine arts, theater, and the cultural affairs in Egypt and Saudi Arabia. He supervised the organization of a large number of events and cultural activities at the Egyptian Cultural Center in Riyadh since 1998 until now. He recorded daily poetry sessions for a number of radio programs in Saudi Arabia. He prepared and presented the “Cultural Spectra” TV program on the Saudi TV family channel.

== Publications ==
Alsayed Agazayerli has published many books that vary between poetry, literature and journalistic documentation, most notably:

- Diwan "A Fistful of Pain from the Lake" (original title: Hafna mn Wjaa Albuhairah) which is a winner of the Central Prize of the General Authority for Cultural Palaces in 1995.
- Diwan “The Biography of Thirst” (original title: serat alatash) published by Al-Mahrousa Publishing Center in Cairo, 2011.
- Diwan “Alphabet of Pain” (original title: Abjadeyat alwajaa) published by Al-Adham Publishing House in Cairo in 2014
- Diwan “Misk of absence” (original title: Misk algheyab) published by Al-Mahrousa Publishing Center in Cairo in 2016.
- Diwan “The Harvest of Salt and the Wind” (original title: hasad almeleh wa alreeh) published by Al Mahrousa Publishing Center in Cairo in 2018
- "The Jasmine Ring" (original title: tawq alyasmeen) a book about the singing experience in Nizar Qabbani's poetry, issued by the International Company for Publishing and Distribution, London in 1999.
- “Desert Knights” (original title: Fursan Alsahraa) a book in Arabic poetry and biography, issued by the International Company for Publishing and Distribution, London in 1999.

In the field of Press Documentation, he issued:

- "Secrets of Diana's Killing" (original title: Asrar maqtal Diana) book, which is a press documentation from the publications of Asdaf Publishing House, 1997.
- "The Ship of Lost Dreams" (original title: Safenat alahlam aldayeaah) book, which is a press documentation, issued by the International Company for Publishing and Distribution, London in 1998.
- "The Clinton and Monica Case" (original title: Qadeyat Clinton wa Monica) book, which is a press documentation, issued by the International Company for Publishing and Distribution, London in 1999.

He has many contributions in the field of antiquities, heritage and tourism media which results from his work in the Media Department of the Saudi Commission for Tourism and National Heritage (currently the Saudi Ministry of Tourism) for more than (13) years; He prepared and contributed to the preparation of more than (40) books on antiquities, heritage and tourism in the Kingdom of Saudi Arabia, including a group of books on Saudi archaeological sites registered on the UNESCO World Heritage List.

== Awards ==
- The Supreme Council of Culture Award for Young Poets in 1993
- The Central Prize of the Egyptian General Authority for Cultural Palaces in 1995.
- The Egyptian Creativity Award in the Kingdom of Saudi Arabia in 1995.
- He was honored by the Hewar Center for Fine Arts in Riyadh in recognition of his role in enriching the Saudi fine plastic movement in 2008.
- The Egyptian Ministry of Higher Education honored him for his role in organizing and revitalizing the Egyptian cultural work at the Egyptian Cultural Center in Saudi Arabia in 2009.
- The Saudi Society for Culture and Arts honored him for his play “The Return of Hamlet,” which was shown at the Saudi Youth Theater Festival in 2012.

== Articles in plastic arts ==
- The work of the artist Ghada bint Musaed open windows on human pain
- Delightful flowers and broken faces Hanan Bahamdan paintings. The art of escaping from nature's silent predicament
- Hala bint Khalid is the first Saudi woman to paint. She writes for children in two languages
- In the new hujilan experience the clarity of colors exposes the spaces of emptiness!
- In an experiment linking the past to the future Abdullah Idris collecting the ashes of the city!
- A tricky question looking for a logical answer: why are art exhibitions held
- Dr. Mohammed Al-rusais: the journey of Saudi women with formation is approaching half a century
- In her sculptural work, halwa Al-Atawi reveals the mystery of the stone
- In his second exhibition in Riyadh, fan Al-Zahrani continues to experiment in different sectors
- The Arab world artist "malva": abstraction is over and the artist records his position with blood and the remnants of the shrine!
- A narrative story or letters lost in the way at Maryam Juma exhibition in Riyadh
- In the exhibition "summer" of Hussein Al-Mohsen escape from "hot" time to "cold" place
- Dr. Adel Tharwat lures popular memory
- Remarkable presence of the memory of the place Al-Saffar reworked the historical evidence in his new exhibition

== Critical articles and readings ==
- The kinetics of blood in the poetry of Ahmed Al-Mulla
