= Saudi Arabia at the 1988 Summer Olympics =

- Flag of Saudi Arabia
- IOC code: KSA
- NOC: Saudi Arabian Olympic Committee

in Seoul
- Competitors: 9 in 3 sports
- Flag bearer: Salah Al-Mar
- Medals: Gold 0 Silver 0 Bronze 0 Total 0

Summer Olympics appearances (overview)
- 1972; 1976; 1980; 1984; 1988; 1992; 1996; 2000; 2004; 2008; 2012; 2016; 2020; 2024; 2028

Saudi Arabia competed at the 1988 Summer Olympics in Seoul, South Korea.

== Competitors ==
The following is the list of number of competitors in the Games.

Sport	Men	Women	Total
Archery	2	0	2
Athletics	6	0	6
Shooting	1	0	1
Total	9	0	9

== Results by event ==
=== Archery ===
In the second time the nation competed in archery at the Olympics, Saudi Arabia entered two men. Once again, the Saudis only narrowly avoided constituting the bottom of the ranking. They placed 82nd and 83rd out of 84 archers.

Men

Athlete	Event	Ranking round		Eighth-final		Quarterfinal		Semifinal		Final	
Athlete	Event	Score	Rank	Score	Rank	Score	Rank	Score	Rank	Score	Rank
Sameer Jawdat	Individual	964	82	Did not advance							
Adel Aljabrin	Individual	921	83	Did not advance							

=== Athletics ===
Men's 3.000m Steeplechase

- Mohammed al-Dosari

1. Heat — 8:45.25
2. Semi Final — 8:44.22 (→ did not advance)

Men's 400 metres

- Haji Bakr Al-Qahtani

Men's Javelin Throw

- Abdul Azeem Al-Alawyat

- Qualification — 56.32m (→ did not advance)
