= Saudi Arabia at the 2024 Summer Olympics =

- Flag of Saudi Arabia
- IOC code: KSA
- NOC: Saudi Arabian Olympic Committee
- Website: olympic.sa (in Arabic and English)

in Paris, France 26 July 2024 – 11 August 2024
- Competitors: 8 (6 men and 2 women) in 4 sports
- Flag bearers (opening): Ramzy Al-Duhami & Dunya Abutaleb
- Flag bearers (closing): Mohammed Tolo & Dunya Abutaleb
- Medals: Gold 0 Silver 0 Bronze 0 Total 0

Summer Olympics appearances (overview)
- 1972; 1976; 1980; 1984; 1988; 1992; 1996; 2000; 2004; 2008; 2012; 2016; 2020; 2024

Saudi Arabia competed at the 2024 Summer Olympics in Paris from 26 July to 11 August 2024. It was the nation's thirteenth appearance at the Summer Olympics except for Moscow 1980 as part of the United States-led boycott.

== Competitors ==
The following is the list of number of competitors in the Games.

Sport	Men	Women	Total
Athletics	2	0	2
Equestrian	3	0	3
Swimming	1	1	2
Taekwondo	0	1	1
Total	6	2	8

== Athletics ==
Saudi Arabian track and field athletes achieved the entry standards for Paris 2024, either by passing the direct qualifying mark (or time for track and road races) or by world ranking, in the following events (a maximum of 3 athletes each):

Key

- Q = Qualified for the next round
- q = Qualified for the next round as a fastest loser or, in field events, by position without achieving the qualifying target
- NR = National record
- NM = Athlete received no mark
- N/A = Round not applicable for the event
- Bye = Athlete not required to compete in round

Field events

Athlete	Event	Qualification		Final	
Athlete	Event	Distance	Position	Distance	Position
Mohammed Tolo	Men's shot put	20.65	15	Did not advance	
Hussain Al-Hizam	Men's pole vault	NM		Did not advance	

== Equestrian ==
For the first time since 2012, Saudi Arabia entered a squad of four jumping riders into the Olympic equestrian competition by securing the first of two available team spots at the International Equestrian Federation (FEI)-designated Olympic qualifier for Group F (Africa and Middle East) in Doha, Qatar. As of October 2023, the kingdom was reportedly willing to offer large sums of money to acquire the world's best horses for the competition.

=== Jumping ===
Athlete	Horse	Event	Qualification			Final		
Athlete	Horse	Event	Penalties	Time	Rank	Penalties	Time	Rank
Ramzy Al-Duhami	Untouchable 32	Individual	0	77.48	19	4	82.73	11
Khaled Almobty	Jaguar King Wd.	Individual	8	75.87	46	Did not advance		
Abdulrahman Alrajhi	Ventago	Individual	0	75.35	10	6	85.68	13
Abdulrahman Alrajhi; Khaled Almobty; Ramzy Al-Duhami	Ventago; Jaguar King Wd. Untouchable 32	Team	28	167.65	19	Did not advance		

The reserve, Khaled Almobty on Jaguar King Wd. replaced Abdullah Al-Sharbatly on Alamo. Since Saudi Arabia were already eliminated and unable to qualify before the third rider, Ramzy Al-Duhami on Untouchable 32 was up, he withdrew leaving the team in second to last place.

== Swimming ==
Saudi Arabia sent two swimmers to compete at the 2024 Paris Olympics.

Athlete	Event	Heat		Semifinal		Final	
Athlete	Event	Time	Rank	Time	Rank	Time	Rank
Zaid Al-Sarraj	Men's 100 m freestyle	51.21	53	Did not advance			
Mashael Meshari A Alayed	Women's 200 m freestyle	2:19.61	29	Did not advance			

Qualifiers for the latter rounds (Q) of all events were decided on a time only basis, therefore positions shown are overall results versus competitors in all heats.

== Taekwondo ==
For the first time since the year 2000, Saudi Arabia qualified an athlete to compete at the taekwondo event. Dunya Abutaleb, became the nation's first female to compete at the taekwondo event in the Olympics, by winning the semifinal rounds in her class, at the 2024 Asian Qualification Tournament in Tai'an, China.

Athlete	Event	Round of 16	Quarterfinals	Semifinals	Repechage	Final / BM	
Athlete	Event	Opposition Result	Opposition Result	Opposition Result	Opposition Result	Opposition Result	Rank
Dunya Abutaleb	Women's 49 kg	Semberg (ISR); W 2–1	Wongpattanakit (THA); L 0–2	Did not advance	El-Bouchti (MAR); W 2–0	Nematzadeh (IRI); L 0–2	5
