= Saudi Arabia at the 2022 Winter Olympics =

- Flag of Saudi Arabia
- IOC code: KSA
- NOC: Saudi Arabian Olympic Committee
- Website: olympic.sa (in Arabic and English)

in Beijing, China 4–20 February 2022
- Competitors: 1 (1 man and 0 women) in 1 sport
- Flag bearer (opening): Fayik Abdi
- Flag bearer (closing): volunteer
- Medals: Gold 0 Silver 0 Bronze 0 Total 0

Winter Olympics appearances (overview)
- 2022; 2026

Saudi Arabia competed at the 2022 Winter Olympics in Beijing, China, from 4 to 20 February 2022. This marked the country's Winter Olympics debut. The Saudi delegation consisted of one male alpine skier, Fayik Abdi.

Abdi was the country's flagbearer during the opening ceremony. Meanwhile a volunteer was the flagbearer during the closing ceremony. Saudi Arabia did not win any medals at the Games.

== Background ==
The Saudi Olympic and Paralympic Committee, formerly known as the Saudi Arabian Olympic Committee, was established in 1964 and recognized by the International Olympic Committee in 1965. Saudi Arabia first participated in the Summer Olympic Games at the 1972 Summer Olympics in Munich. The country made its debut at the Winter Olympic Games at the 2022 Winter Olympics.

The 2022 Winter Olympics were held in Beijing, China, from 4 to 20 February 2022. The Saudi Winter Sports Federation was established in 2020. In early 2021, the federation called for alpine skiers and snowboarders who could potentially compete for the country at the Olympics. Eight athletes were selected from the applicants to undergo further training with the aim of qualifying for the Olympics. The Saudi delegation consisted of a single athlete, alpine skier Fayik Abdi.

Abdi served as Saudi Arabia's flag-bearer during the opening ceremony. Meanwhile a volunteer was the flagbearer during the closing ceremony. Saudi Arabia did not win any medals at the Games.

== Competitors ==
The Saudi delegation consisted of one athlete competing in one sport.

Sport	Men	Women	Total
Alpine skiing	1	0	1
Total	1	0	1

== Alpine skiing ==
The basic qualification mark for the slalom and giant slalom events stipulated an average of less than 160 points in the list published by the International Ski Federation (FIS) as on 17 January 2022. The quotas were allocated further based on athletes satisfying other criteria with a maximum of 22 athletes (11 male and 11 female athletes) from a single participating NOC. Skiers Fayik Abdi and Salman Al Howaish met the basic qualification standard for giant slalom and slalom events respectively. However, Saudi Arabia was allocated only a single quota for the Games. Hence, ultimately only Abdi was selected to compete for the country.

Abdi was born in San Diego, California. He was introduced to alpine skiing by his mother at the age of four during a trip to Lebanon. He attended Dhahran Ahliya School in Saudi Arabia before attending the IMG Academy in Bradenton, Florida from 2012 to 2016. He subsequently studied criminology at the University of Utah and graduated in 2020. During his time in Utah, he practised skiing at the Snowbird Ski Resort. After graduating, Abdi returned to Saudi Arabia and was involved in efforts to develop sand skiing in the country, along with Henrik May. In 2021, he participated in a ski film project and was subsequently invited by the Saudi Winter Sports Federation. After meeting with the federation, he began training in Saas-Fee, Switzerland, in August 2021, with the aim of qualifying for the Olympics. He competed in several international races in Europe to try and meet the qualification requirements for the Games.

At the Games, Abdi became the first Saudi Arabian athlete to compete in the Winter Olympic Games. The men's giant slalom event was held on 13 February 2022 at the Yanqing National Alpine Skiing Centre. He completed his first run in 1:21.44 to rank 51st among the 54 competitors. Though he took slightly longer to complete the course during his second run at 1:25.41, he ranked 45th. With a combined time of 2:46.85, he finished 44th in the overall classification.

Athlete	Event	Run 1		Run 2		Total	
Athlete	Event	Time	Rank	Time	Rank	Time	Rank
Fayik Abdi	Men's giant slalom	1:21.44	51	1:25.41	45	2:46.85	44
