= Equestrian at the 2005 Islamic Solidarity Games =

Equestrian at the 2005 Islamic Solidarity Games was held in King Abdulaziz University, Jeddah from April 9 to April 14, 2005. The competition included only jumping events.

== Medalists ==
Event	Gold	Silver	Bronze
Individual speed	Khaled Al-Eid; Saudi Arabia	Kamal Bahamdan; Saudi Arabia	Meftah Al-Zaheri; United Arab Emirates
Individual	Faisal Al-Shalan; Saudi Arabia	Mohamed Al-Kumaiti; United Arab Emirates	Adel Khamis Saeed; United Arab Emirates
Team	Saudi Arabia; Ramzy Al-Duhami; Khaled Al-Eid; Abdullah Al-Saud; Kamal Bahamdan	United Arab Emirates; Mohamed Al-Kumaiti; Abdullah Al-Muhairi; Mohamed Al-Owais; Mohamed Al-Suwaidi	Egypt
All-around	Faisal Al-Shalan; Saudi Arabia	Khaled Al-Eid; Saudi Arabia	Mohamed Al-Kumaiti; United Arab Emirates

== Medal table ==
Rank	Nation	Gold	Silver	Bronze	Total
1	Saudi Arabia (KSA)	4	2	0	6
2	United Arab Emirates (UAE)	0	2	3	5
3	Egypt (EGY)	0	0	1	1
Totals (3 entries)		4	4	4	12
