= Kamil Al-Abbasi =

Saudi Arabian sprinter

Personal information
- Nationality: Saudi Arabian
- Born: 28 February 1950 (age 76)

Sport
- Sport: Sprinting
- Event: 4 × 400 metres relay
Medal record
Men's athletics
Representing Saudi Arabia
Arab Championships
| Silver medal – second place | 1977 Damascus | 4 × 400 m relay |
| Bronze medal – third place | 1977 Damascus | 400 m hurdles |

Kamil Al-Abbasi (Arabic: كامل العباسي; born 28 February 1950) is a Saudi Arabian hurdler. He won medals at the Arab Athletics Championships and was the second-ever Saudi Olympic flag bearer. He competed in the men's 400 metres hurdles and 4 × 400 metres relay at the 1976 Summer Olympics.

== Career ==
Al-Abbasi was the Saudi Arabian flag bearer at the 1976 Olympics. He was seeded in the 4th 400 m hurdles heat, where he ran 55.00 seconds to finish 5th. In the 4 × 400 m relay, he led off the Saudi team to run 3:17.53 and place 7th in their heat.

Al-Abbasi entered in the 400 m hurdles and 4 × 400 m at the inaugural 1977 Arab Athletics Championships in Damascus, Syria. He ran second leg for the Saudi relay team to win the silver medal in 3:12.39 behind Iraq. In the 400 m hurdles, Al-Abbasi ran a personal best of 53.73 seconds to win the bronze medal.

Olympic Games
| Preceded by Bilal Said Al-Azma | Flagbearer for Saudi Arabia; 1976 Montreal | Succeeded by Safaq Al-Anzi |
