= Fayik Abdi =

Saudi alpine skier (born 1997)

Personal information
- Full name: Fayik Rifat Abdi
- Born: October 8, 1997 (age 28) San Diego, California, U.S.
- Education: University of Utah
- Height: 6 ft 1 in (185 cm)

Skiing career
- Country: Saudi Arabia
- Sport: Alpine skiing
- Disciplines: Giant slalom, slalom

Olympics
- Teams: 2 – (2022, 2026)
- Medals: 0

World Championships
- Teams: 1 – (2025)
- Medals: 0

Fayik Rifat Abdi (Arabic: فايق عابدي; born October 8, 1997) is an Olympic alpine ski racer from Saudi Arabia. He is the first Saudi Arabian ski racer to compete in the Winter Olympic Games and the first ever Winter Olympian from Saudi Arabia and the Gulf. After graduating from the University of Utah, Salt Lake City, Abdi returned to Saudi Arabia to pursue skiing as a professional sport.

== Early life and education ==
Abdi was born on October 8, 1997, in San Diego, California to Saudi parents. He attended IMG Academy for high school and graduated from the University of Utah in 2020. As a young boy, Abdi's mother would take him to the slopes of Lebanon, where he would practice skiing. He later started traveling to Switzerland to a winter camp, where he trained in skiing.

== Career ==
In 2017, he worked at Snowbird as a ski technician and then worked at Alta Ski Area in the same role in November 2019. In 2022, Abdi completed his historic participation in the giant slalom competition at the 2022 Beijing Olympics, finishing 44th out of 91 competitors.

As of 2022, Abdi is an athlete for the Saudi Olympic & Paralympic Committee and the Saudi Olympic Training Center.

== World Championship results ==
Year
Year	Age	Slalom	Giant slalom	Super-G	Downhill	Team combined	Team event
2025	27	—	DNS1	—	—	—	—

== Olympic results ==
Year
Year	Age	Slalom	Giant slalom	Super-G	Downhill	Combined	Team combined	Team event
2022	24	—	44	—	—	—	—N/a	—
2026	28	—	67	—	—	—N/a	—	—N/a

== See also ==
- Saudi Arabia at the 2022 Winter Olympics
- Alpine skiing at the 2022 Winter Olympics
- Alpine skiing at the 2022 Winter Olympics – Qualification
