= Wojdan Shaherkani =

Saudi Arabian judoka (born 1996)

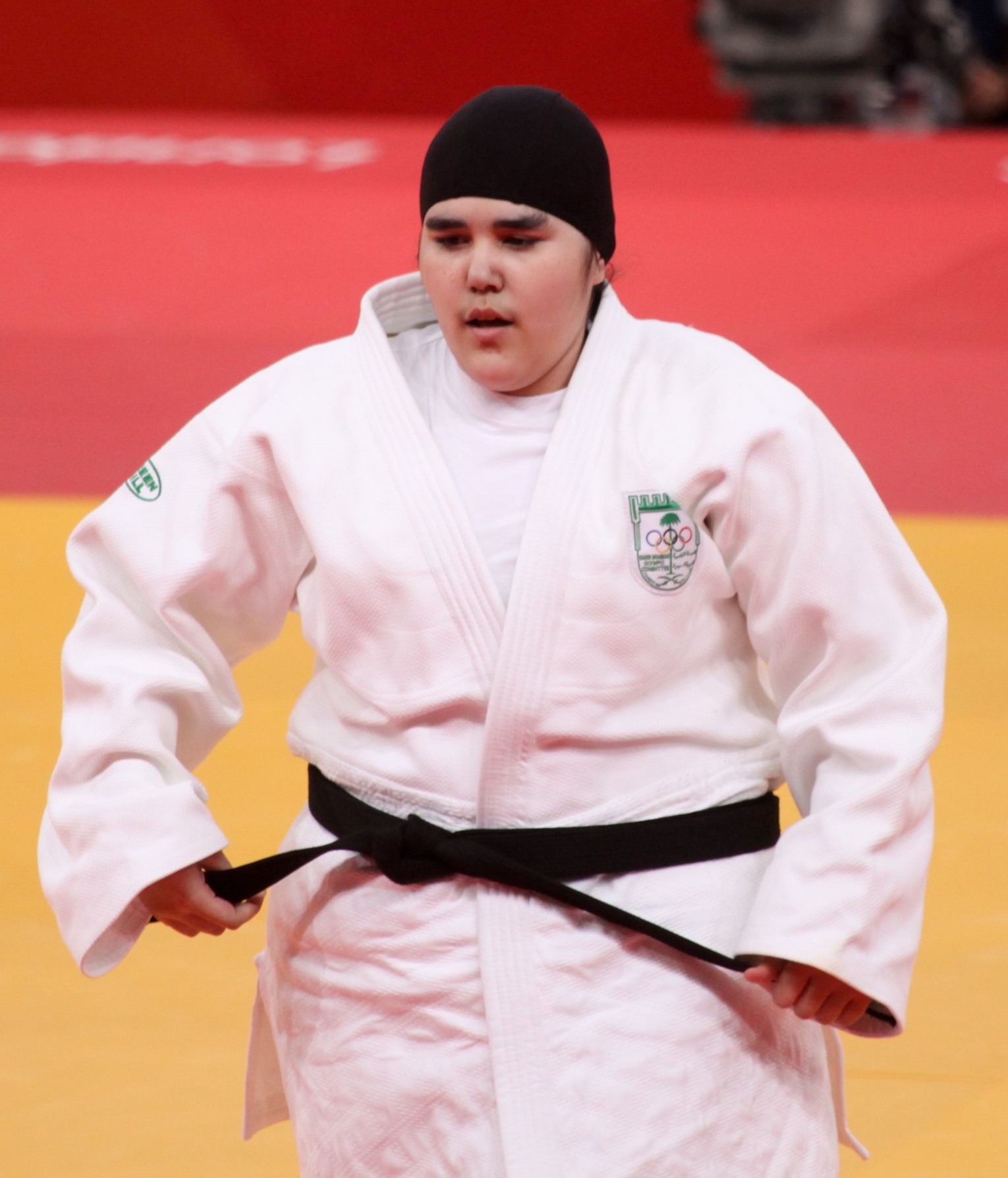
- Shaherkani at the 2012 Olympics

Personal information
- Born: 1 February 1996 (age 30) Mecca, Saudi Arabia
- Weight: 80 kg (176 lb) (2012)

Sport
- Country: Saudi Arabia
- Sport: Judo
- Event: +78 kg

Wojdan Ali Seraj Abdulrahim Shahrkhani (or "Shaherkani"; Arabic: وجدان علي سراج الدين شهرخاني; born 1 February 1996) is a Saudi judoka who was one of two women selected to represent the Kingdom of Saudi Arabia at the 2012 Summer Olympics. She was the first woman to represent Saudi Arabia at the Olympics.

== Career ==
Shaherkani took up judo because of her father, a judo referee. Her first international competition was the 2012 London Olympics.

=== 2012 Summer Olympics ===
Shahrkhani was one of two Saudi Arabian women selected to compete in the 2012 Summer Olympics held in London, United Kingdom. She competed in judo in the above 78 kg event. The other Saudi woman selected was Pepperdine University-based runner Sarah Attar, who competed in the women's 800 metres.

Shahrkhani was invited to compete by specific invitation of the International Olympic Committee (IOC) as she was not eligible based on international and regional ranking criteria. The top 14 women in each weight class based on international rankings automatically qualified, while 8 women across all classes from Asia qualified based on the continental rankings, with 20 total additional spots available through special invitation of the IOC, ANOC and the IJF. Other judoka in the competition had attained black belts in the sport; Shaherkani only had a blue belt (二級 nikyū), two levels below a black belt.

There was opposition within Saudi Arabia to the concept of women representing the country at the Olympics. Ultimately the Saudi government gave in to international pressure from sport and women's rights activists to include women or face possible sanctions. The IOC president Jacques Rogge said of Shahrkhani's and Attar's inclusion, "The I.O.C. has been working very closely with the Saudi Arabian Olympic Committee and I am pleased to see that our continued dialogue has come to fruition."

The Saudi Arabian Olympic Committee chose not to promote Shahrkhani's participation. They also required that she "dress modestly, be accompanied by a male guardian and not mix with men" while in London for the 2012 Games. Additionally, her competition clothing had to comply with Sharia law. On 30 July 2012, Shahrkhani said that she would withdraw from the event if she was not permitted to wear her hijab during bouts. Her father (who often speaks for her, partially because she does not know English) clarified that he wanted his daughter to compete, and that they wanted to make "new history for Saudi's women", but that she would not participate without a hijab. The next day the IOC and the International Judo Federation announced that agreement had been reached on a hijab that she could wear. The design agreed upon was a tight-fitting, cap-style covering, rather than the more common headscarf which drapes around the neck and under the chin.

Her first match was in the Round of 32, which was an elimination round, on 3 August, the seventh day of competition at the Olympics. Wearing white, she lost to Puerto Rican Melissa Mojica in 82 seconds, lasting longer than the shortest match in her weight class, which lasted 48 seconds where Mika Sugimoto of Japan beat Maria Suelen Altheman of Brazil. The match was refereed by Wilian Rosquet, and judged by Young Chun Jeon and Cathy Mouette. There were no penalties awarded in the match. After the match, she said to the press (in Arabic): "I am happy to be at the Olympics. Unfortunately, we did not win a medal, but in the future we will and I will be a star for women's participation." She also stated that, because she was not accustomed to fighting in such large tournaments and because of the debate over the hijab, it had been difficult for her to focus on the competition. Despite this, she clarified that she was happy to have participated and planned to continue to practise judo in the future. Although her fight was not televised live on any local Saudi television channels, it was available within the Kingdom on several satellite networks broadcasting from other parts of the Arab world.
