= Sulaiman Hamad =

Saudi Arabian judoka (born 1994)

Personal information
- Born: 19 May 1994 (age 32)
- Occupation: Judoka

Sport
- Country: Saudi Arabia
- Sport: Judo
- Weight class: ‍–‍73 kg

Achievements and titles
- Olympic Games: R32 (2016, 2020)
- World Champ.: R16 (2021)
- Asian Champ.: R16 (2012, 2014, 2015, 2016, 2017, 2018)
Medal record
Men's judo
Representing Saudi Arabia
Asian Cadet Championships
| Bronze medal – third place | 2011 Beirut | ‍–‍73 kg |

Profile at external databases
- IJF: 9627
- JudoInside.com: 81097
- Updated on 9 May 2023

Sulaiman Hamad (Arabic: سليمان حمد; born 19 May 1994, in Jeddah) is a Saudi judoka. He competed at the 2016 Summer Olympics in the men's 66 kg, in which he was eliminated in the second round by Davaadorjiin Tömörkhüleg. He was the flag bearer for Saudi Arabia at the Parade of Nations.

In July 2021, Hamad competed in the men's 73 kg event at the 2020 Summer Olympics in Tokyo, Japan.

Olympic Games
| Preceded by Sultan Mubarak Al-Dawoodi | Flagbearer for Saudi Arabia; 2016 Rio de Janeiro | Succeeded by Yasmeen Al-Dabbagh; Husein Alireza |
