= Saleh Al-Qobaissi =

Saudi Arabian cyclist

Personal information
- Born: 6 November 1964 (age 61)

Cycling career
- Sport: Cycling

Saleh Al-Qobaissi (Arabic: صالح القبيسي; born 6 November 1964) is a Saudi Arabian former cyclist. He competed in two events at the 1992 Summer Olympics.
