= Sarah Attar =

Saudi-American track and field athlete

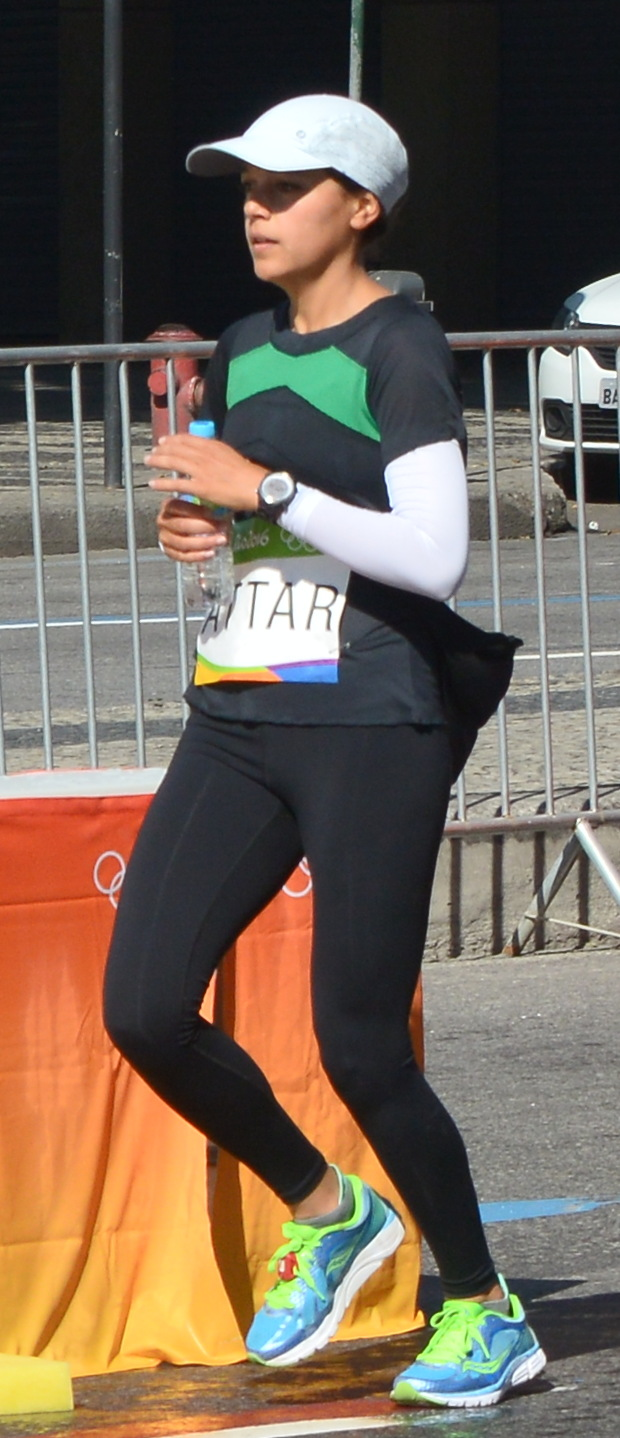
- Attar at the 2016 Summer Olympics

Personal information
- Nationality: American-Saudi Arabian
- Born: August 27, 1992 (age 34) Escondido, California, United States
- Height: 5 ft 4 in (163 cm)
- Weight: 52 kg (115 lb)

Sport
- Country: Saudi Arabia
- Sport: Athletics
- Events: 800 metres and marathon
- College team: Pepperdine University
- Club: Mammoth Track Club
- Coached by: Andrew Kastor

Achievements and titles
- Personal bests: 800 m – 2:44.95 (2012); 3000 m – 11:27.30 (2013); Half marathon - 1:26:47 (2018); Marathon – 3:07:16 (2018)

Sarah Attar (Arabic: سارة عطار; born August 27, 1992) is a Saudi-American track and field athlete who competed at the 2012 Summer Olympics as one of the first two female Olympians representing Saudi Arabia. She also competed in the marathon at the 2016 Summer Olympics.

Attar has lived in the United States her entire life, but has dual US-Saudi citizenship through her father, who was born in Saudi Arabia. She was invited to participate in the Olympics despite her not having met the standard Olympic qualifying times, which were waived by the International Olympic Committee.

== Early life and education ==
Attar was born and raised in Escondido, California, United States. Her mother, Judy, is an American national hailing from California, and her father, Amer, is a Saudi Arabian national who went to college in the United States and married Judy in 1984. She has dual US-Saudi citizenship.

She graduated from Escondido High School, in Escondido, in 2010. She competed for the school in cross country running.

She then attended Pepperdine University, a Christian university in Los Angeles County, California, near Malibu, where she earned a B.A. in studio arts, having won the Rex Hamilton Memorial Art Scholarship. Attar was one of eight athletes from Pepperdine to be selected to compete at the 2012 Summer Olympics, along with Roxanne Barker, who was on the South African team and others. She ran in two college meets for Pepperdine in March 2012, finishing 12th in a 1,500-meter heat in the Cal State Fullerton Ben Brown Invitational in 5:30.51, and 29th in the 3,000 meters in the Spring Break Invitational in 11:37.41.

After graduating from Pepperdine in 2014, she became a landscape photographer. In 2015, she moved to Mammoth Lakes, California, to train full-time with distance runners including Olympian Deena Kastor, the wife of her coach Andrew Kastor.

She has lived in the United States her entire life, and though she does not speak Arabic she travels to Saudi Arabia about once a year to visit relatives.

== Running career ==
=== Representing Saudi Arabia ===
Attar was named one of the first two women to compete for Saudi Arabia in the Olympics, joining their Olympic team at the 2012 Summer Olympics. The other woman representing Saudi Arabia was judoka Wojdan Shaherkani.

Prior to June 2012, the Saudi Arabian Olympic Committee had banned the Kingdom's women from competing at the Olympics, but the International Olympic Committee (IOC) had threatened to ban Saudi Arabia from the Olympic Games unless it allowed its women to compete. The IOC decided that Saudi Arabia's female competitors did not have to meet Olympic qualifying standards.

Attar was expected by Saudi Arabia to wear running outfits that complied with Islamic law. Photographs of her in her typical clothing, wearing a tank top, shorts, and with her hair not covered by a head scarf, were deleted from the internet, including from her university's track and cross country website. She and her mother put together a head-and-neck covering for her to compete in, along with long sleeves and long pants. Attar lives and trains in the United States, without wearing a hijab or abaya covering her.

Attar said: "Hopefully this can make such a huge difference." Saudi Arabian scholar Ali Al-Ahmed, who has published studies on women's sports in Saudi Arabia, opined: "The presence of female athletes [in the 2012 Olympics] made things worse, because it allowed Saudi Arabia to escape criticism." However, conservative Saudi religious clerics strongly opposed and issued rulings against Saudi women participating in spectator sports, maintaining that it may lead to corrupt morals, loss of virginity, and lesbianism.

=== 2012 Olympic Games ===
During the Opening Ceremonies' Parade of Nations, Attar and Shaherkani, the only two females in the Saudi Arabian delegation, were forced to walk behind their male teammates, unlike women in delegations from other Islamic nations.

Attar competed in the women's 800 metres, without having met the Olympic qualifying time. She had competed at the distance only once, during high school, but not since she had attended college. She said: "The 800 was a good option because I wouldn’t be out there getting lapped in the 5,000 or something."

Attar competed in Heat 6 of the women's 800m qualifying heats on August 8, 2012. She finished last, with a time of 2:44.95, far behind Janeth Jepkosgei's heat-winning 2:01.04. She finished more than half a minute slower than her nearest competitor, who crossed the finish line 150 meters ahead of her. Hundreds of spectators stood and applauded Attar as she crossed the finish line.

Her participation in the Olympics was mentioned by only one Saudi Arabian paper, which was criticized for doing so.

=== 2016 Olympic Games ===
Attar competed for Saudi Arabia in the 2016 Olympic Games in the marathon. She again received a wild card entry, in which she did not have to meet the standard Olympic qualifying time. Her best marathon time was 3:11:27 at the 2015 Chicago Marathon, 26 minutes slower than the Olympic qualifying time. The Saudi Arabian Olympic Committee website did not name her or the other women who would represent the Kingdom.

She ran fully covered, wearing long sleeves and long pants as she had in 2012, but this time wearing a baseball cap instead of a headscarf. She completed the marathon in 132nd place out of 133 women who finished, in a time of 3:16:11, which was 52 minutes behind the Kenyan winner Jemima Sumgong.

== Post 2016 Olympics ==
In 2018, Sarah improved her personal best in the Marathon, at the Chicago Marathon, running 3:07:16, and the half marathon, at the Houston Half Marathon, in 1:26:47, both national records for the respective distances.

== Competitions ==
Year	Competition	Venue	Position	Event	Notes
Representing Refugee Athletes
2012	Summer Olympics	London, United Kingdom	8th (h)	800 m	2:44.95
2016	Summer Olympics	Rio de Janeiro, Brazil	132nd	Marathon	3:16:11

=== Sponsorship ===
Attar was previously sponsored by Oiselle, an American running apparel company that promotes and supports female athletes.
