= Saud al-Dosari =

Saudi Arabian television presenter

Saud al-Dosari (Arabic: سعود الدوسري; 23 August 1968 – 7 August 2015) was a Saudi television presenter, best known for his work for the Middle East Broadcasting Center (MBC). He was born in Dilam, Al-Kharj.

== Death ==
Al-Dosari died at the age of 47 from a heart attack in Paris, France. He was later laid to rest in Riyadh.
