= Hanan Bahamdan =

Saudi visual artist (born 1966)

Hanan Abdullah Bahamdan (Arabic: حنان باحمدان; born 1966) is a Saudi visual artist, known for her portraits.

== Biography ==
Hanan Abdullah Bahamdan was born in Riyadh, Saudi Arabia, in 1966. Her father, Abdullah Bahamdan, previously served as chairman of the Saudi National Bank; her brother is the businessman and equestrian Kamal Bahamdan.

Bahamdan began painting in her early 20s. She first studied art and exhibited her work in Riyadh, holding her inaugural show at her own home in 1991. She earned a bachelor's in business administration from King Saud University.

She later moved to Egypt and London to work and study, spending two years under the mentorship of the Egyptian pastel artist Mohamed Sabry. She has a diploma in portraiture from London's Heatherley School of Fine Art.

Bahamdan is primarily known for her portraits. Arab News describes her work as "filled with a sense of suppressed agitation or latent distress through the disconcerted expressions of her subjects." She often depicts those who go overlooked, as in Mannci ("The Forgotten"), her 2007 portrait of a working-class Egyptian man, which was the first piece by a female Saudi artist to be auctioned by Sotheby's. This body of work is documented in the 2009 book Art of Forgotten Faces.

Her work is held in various private collections as well as by Saudi Arabia's General Presidency for Youth Welfare and Ministry of Labor.

== Selected exhibitions ==
- Atelier of Fine Arts, Jeddah, 2001
- The Plastic Arts Gallery at the Cairo Opera House, Cairo, 2005
- Hewar Art Gallery, Riyadh, 2009
