= Mohamed Al-Takroni =

Saudi Arabian cyclist

Personal information
- Born: 5 October 1967 (age 59)

Cycling career
- Sport: Cycling

Mohamed Al-Takroni (Arabic: محمد التكروني; born 5 October 1967) is a Saudi Arabian former cyclist. He competed in two events at the 1992 Summer Olympics.
