= Saleh Al-Dosari =

Saudi Arabian footballer

Personal information
- Full name: Saleh waleed Al-Dosari
- Date of birth: December 19, 1987 (age 38)
- Place of birth: Saudi Arabia
- Height: 1.78 m (5 ft 10 in)
- Position: Midfielder

Youth career
- 2004–2007: Al-Hilal

Senior career*
Years	Team	Apps	(Gls)
2007–2010	Al-Hilal	??	(4)
2010–2015	Al-Riyadh SC		
- * Club domestic league appearances and goals

Saleh Al-Dosari (born December 19, 1987) is a Saudi footballer who plays as a midfielder.
