= Mansour Al-Juaid =

Saudi Arabian sprinter

Personal information
- Nationality: Saudi Arabian
- Born: 1 July 1948 (age 78)

Sport
- Sport: Sprinting
- Event: 100 metres

Mansour Al-Juaid (Arabic: منصور الجعيد; born 1 July 1948) is a Saudi Arabian sprinter. He competed in the men's 100 metres at the 1972 Summer Olympics.
