= Mohamed Hamed Al-Bishi =

Saudi Arabian sprinter

Personal information
- Nationality: Saudi Arabian
- Born: 29 October 1975 (age 50)

Sport
- Sport: Sprinting
- Event: 400 metres
Medal record
Men's athletics
Representing Saudi Arabia
Asian Championships
Silver medal – second place	1993 Manila	4×400 m

Mohamed Hamed Al-Bishi (Arabic: محمد حامد البيشي; born 29 October 1975) is a Saudi Arabian sprinter. He competed in the men's 400 metres at the 1996 Summer Olympics.
