= Bilal Said Al-Azma =

Saudi Arabian sprinter

Personal information
- Nationality: Saudi Arabian
- Born: 23 February 1955 (age 71)

Sport
- Sport: Sprinting
- Event: 4 × 100 metres relay

Bilal Said Al-Azma (born 23 February 1955) is a Saudi Arabian sprinter. He competed in the men's 4 × 100 metres relay at the 1972 Summer Olympics.
