= Yasmeen Al-Dabbagh =

Saudi Arabian athlete

Personal information
- Born: 22 September 1997 (age 28)

Sport
- Sport: Athletics
- Event: 100 metres

Yasmeen Al-Dabbagh (Arabic: ياسمين الدباغ; born 22 September 1997) is a Saudi Arabian athlete who specialises in the sprints.

Al-Dabbagh broke the national female 100 metres record at the national trials with a record time of 13.24. As well as being chosen for the 2020 Summer Olympics, she was given the honour of being the flag bearer for her nation in the opening ceremony.

Al-Dabbagh graduated from Columbia University in 2019 and trained with the school's track and field team. Her father is the businessman Amr Al-Dabbagh.
