= Medhadi Al-Dosari =

Saudi Arabian cyclist

Personal information
- Born: 8 April 1976 (age 50)

Cycling career
- Sport: Cycling

Medhadi Al-Dosari (Arabic: مضحي الدوسري; born 8 April 1976) is a Saudi Arabian former cyclist. He competed in two events at the 1992 Summer Olympics.
