= Kamal Bahamdan =

Saudi Arabian equestrian (born 1970)

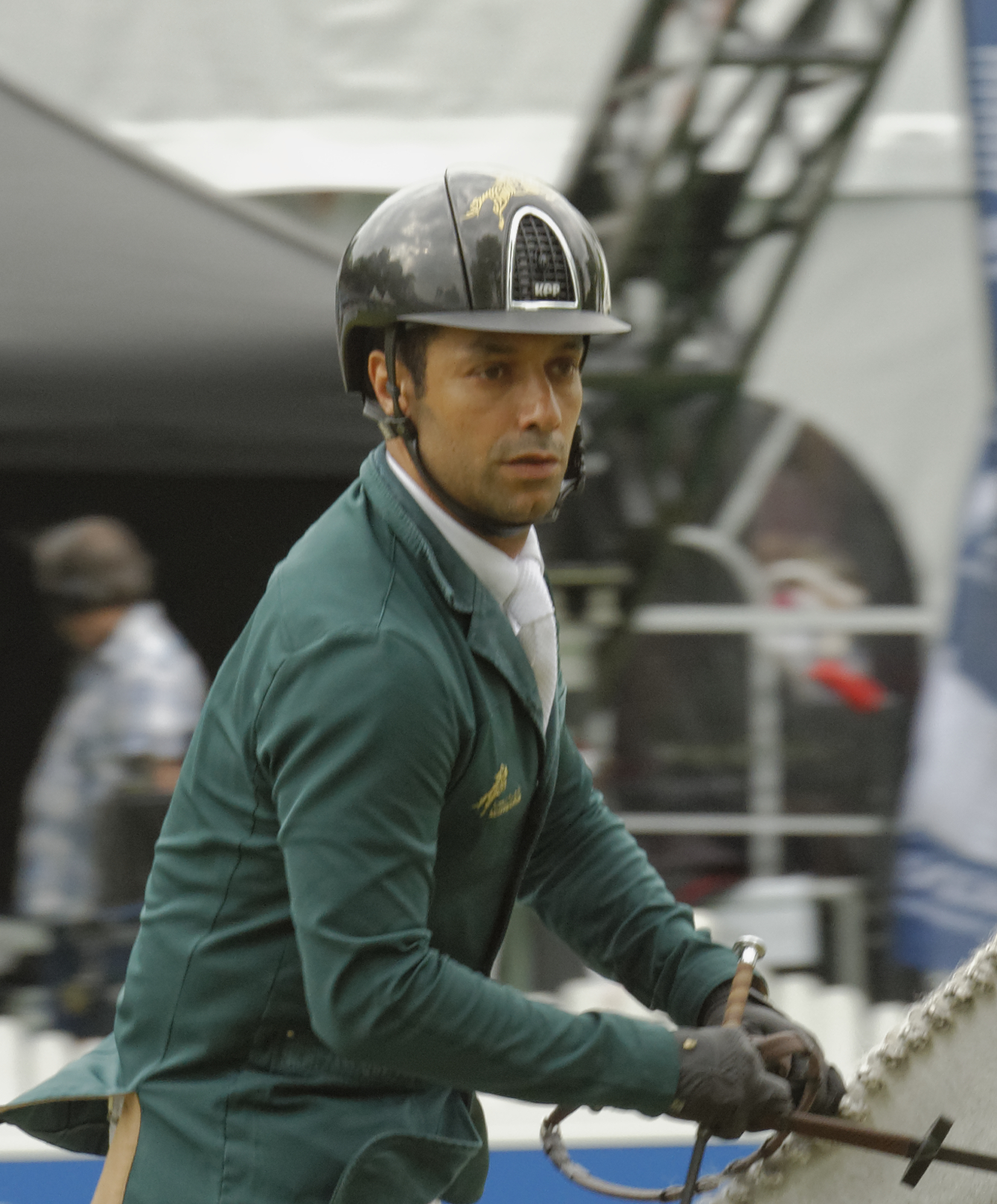
- Kamal Bahamdan, CEO of Safanad

Personal information
- Nationality: Saudi Arabian
- Born: Kamal Abdullah Bahamdan; 12 February 1970 (age 56)
- Education: Boston University

Sport
- Country: Saudi Arabia
- Sport: Equestrian
Medal record
Equestrian
Representing Saudi Arabia
Olympic Games
Bronze medal – third place	2012 London	Team jumping
Asian Games
Gold medal – first place	2006 Doha	Team jumping
Islamic Solidarity Games
Gold medal – first place	2005 Jeddah	Team
Silver medal – second place	2005 Jeddah	Individual speed

Kamal Bahamdan (Arabic: كمال باحمدان; born 12 February 1970) is a Saudi Arabian businessman and five-time Olympic equestrian.

== Early life ==
Kamal was born in Riyadh, after attending high school he graduated in 1994 from Boston University with a Bachelor of Science in Manufacturing Engineering. His sister is the painter Hanan Bahamdan.

== Career ==
He is the founder and CEO of the global holding company, Safanad, which he established in 2009 with the backing of the Bahamdan Group, of which he is the Vice Chairman. The Group was established in the 1940s by his grandfather Salem Bahamdan in Makkah. It was incorporated in the 1950s in Riyadh by his father Abdullah Bahamdan the former MD and Chairman of the National Commercial Bank (NCB) of Saudi Arabia, which was at the time the Arab world's largest bank. Since foundation, the Group has made more than 250 investments in a range of markets and sectors across the Middle East, Europe, Asia and the United States.

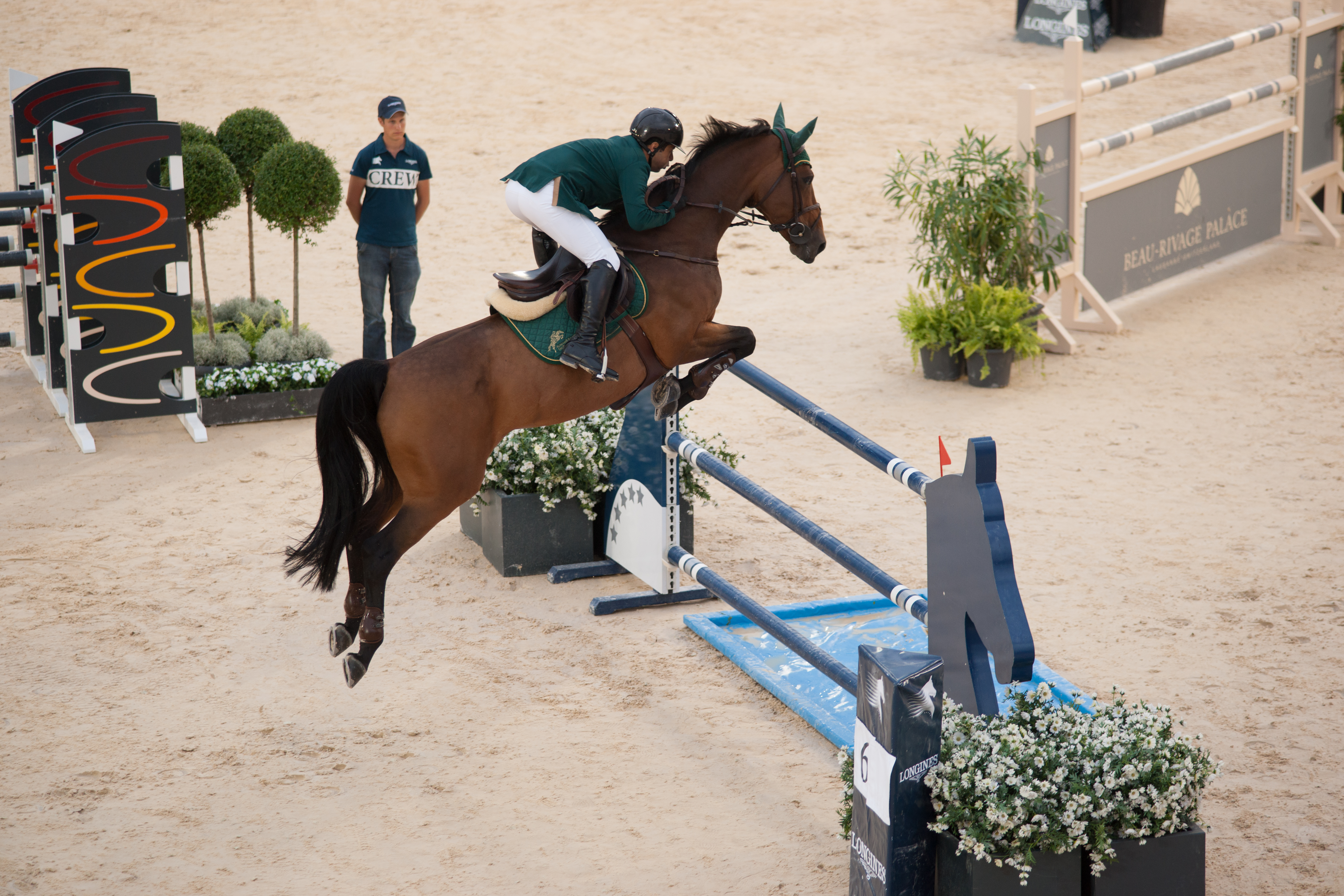
Kamal Bahamdan on Noblesse Des Tess, competing in the 2013 Longines Global Champions Tour

In March 2014, Safanad and Formation Capital sold a portfolio of 43 senior housing facilities and 37 skilled nursing facilities to NorthStar Realty for $1.05 billion.

In June 2014, Safanad and Ron Packard, education company Stride, Inc. founder and former CEO, announced the launch of a new education company, Pansophic Learning. Upon establishment, the company immediately acquired from K12 Inc. several assets including licenses to curriculum and technology, an international brick and mortar private school, a higher education platform business, and the K12 business in the Middle East. The company has grown to serve more than 50,000 students across 165 schools and early learning academies, primarily in the US, Europe, and Africa. In October 2022, Safanad announced further expansion of its education platform with an initial planned investment of US$200 million in the MENA region's education sector and a commitment to invest significantly beyond this to acquire, manage and develop multiple charter, online, early learning, and K-12 private schools independently and in partnership with regional governments.

Beyond investing in education, Bahamdan is also an education philanthropist. In December 2022, Boston University, his alma mater, announced that he had endowed a chair in early childhood wellbeing which the university said marked a significant milestone in its work in this field.

Safanad is also the owner of HC-One, an elderly care home provider working in the UK. A BBC Panorama investigation highlighted how private-equity investors such as Kamal Bahamdan negatively impact certain sectors of the economy, by diverting company money to finance expensive debts introduced by the investor. HC-One, however, clarified these allegations stating, ‘In the past five years, our owners have enabled us to invest £145 million in upgrading our homes, with a further £115 million committed by 2022 to 2023. This far exceeds all the cumulative dividends and management fees they have received over the same period – a total of £32 million...’ We have always been UK tax resident, pay full tax in the UK, and file our accounts at Companies House... We do not use our structure to artificially reduce our earnings.

Previously, Bahamdan also co-founded Al-Khabeer Merchant Finance Corporation (est.2007), and was Managing Partner and co-founder of Washington DC-based international investment firm BV Group (est. 1995).

== Boards and appointments ==
Bahamdan was elected to the Board of Trustees of Boston University, his alma mater, beginning his tenure in December 2025. He is also a member of the Board of the Saudi Olympic & Paralympic Committee having been appointed in March 2025.

== Awards and recognitions ==
In 2012, he was awarded the King Abdulaziz Order of Merit First Class and in 2006 was named a Forum of Young Global Leaders in business by the Forum of Young Global Leaders, an affiliate organisation of the World Economic Forum.

== Show jumping ==
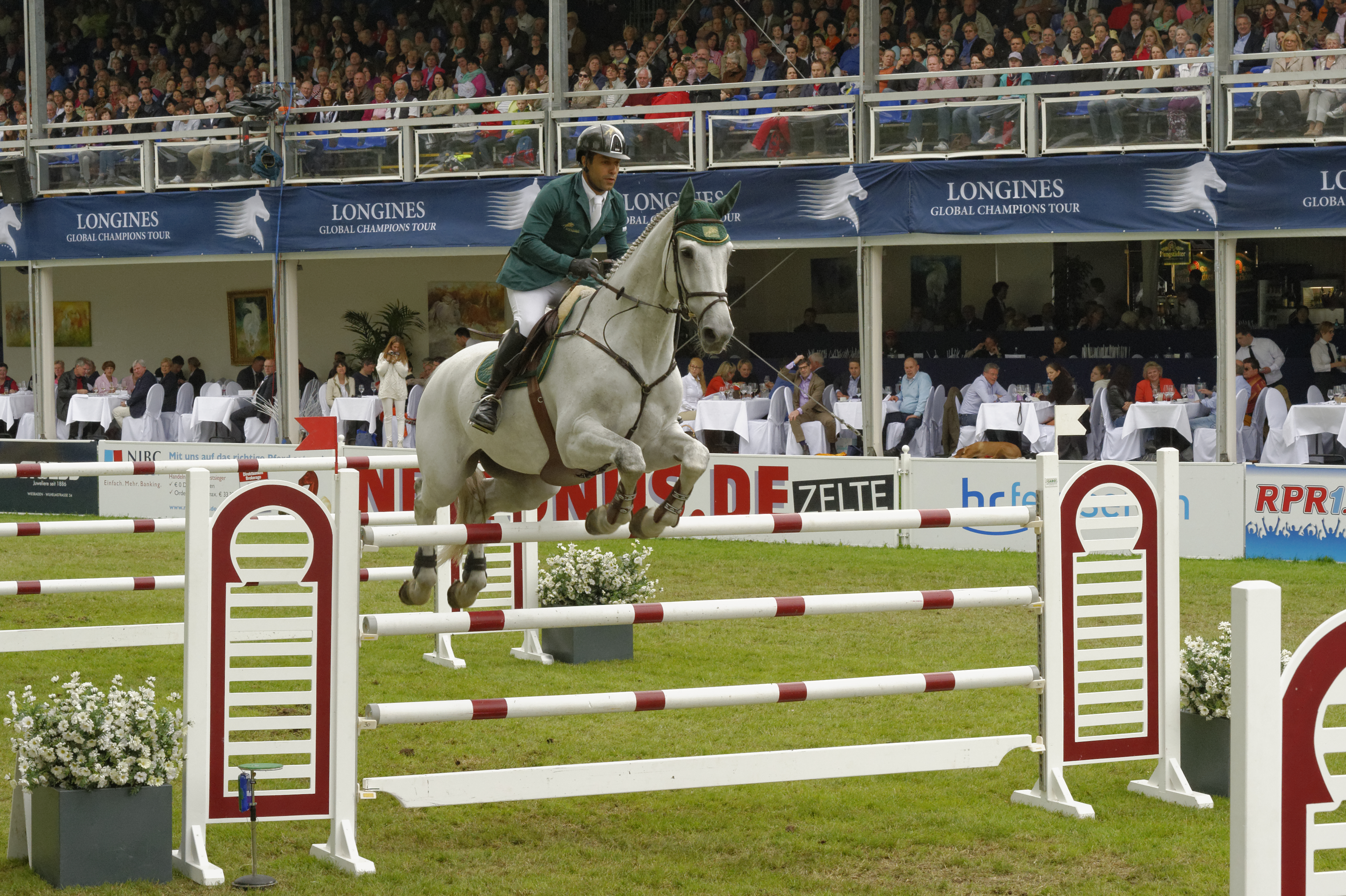
Wiesbaden 2013

Bahamdan is also a sports champion.

Riding since the age of seven, he took further riding lessons in the United Kingdom every summer, and then started competing in local equestrian events, often against compatriots Ramzy Al-Duhami and Khaled Al-Eid. Whilst studying then working in finance in the United States he competed on the East Coast circuit, where he came to the attention of Ziyad Abduljawad, now managing director of Saudi Equestrian. In 2004, he moved his riding base to Valkenswaard, Netherlands, making his international competition debut in the same year, but competing only on a part-time basis.

After winning the team and individual gold at the 2004 Pan Arab Games, he won the team gold and individual silver medal at the 2011 Pan Arab Games in Doha. Having competed at the Summer Olympics in 1996, 2000, 2004, and 2008, after the 2010 FEI World Equestrian Games in Kentucky, he decided to concentrate full-time in the lead-up to the 2012 Summer Olympics in London, England, working with Jan Tops. With the Saudi team coached by Stanny Van Paesschen, the team won bronze and Bahamdan came fourth in the individual event. He has since entered the Longines-sponsored Global Champions Tour, winning the 2013 Riyadh Grand Prix with Noblesse des Tess.

In 2013 he was appointed to the International Federation for Equestrian Sports (FEI) Jumping committee, for an initial four-year period. In February 2014 he was named runner up in the Arriyadiyah Awards for Sports Excellence, presented by Prince Nawaf bin Faisal.
