= Saudi Olympic and Paralympic Committee =

National Olympic Committee

Saudi Olympic & Paralympic Committee
- Country: Saudi Arabia
- Code: KSA
- Created: 1964
- Recognized: 1965
- Continental Association: OCA
- Headquarters: Riyadh, Saudi Arabia
- President: Abdulaziz bin Turki Al Saud
- Secretary General: Abdulaziz Al-Anazi
- Website: olympic.sa

The Saudi Olympic & Paralympic Committee (SOPC, Arabic: اللجنة الأولمبية السعودية وأولمبياد المعاقين; IOC code: KSA) is the National Olympic Committee and the National Paralympic Committee representing Saudi Arabia.

Until the 2012 Summer Olympics in London, Saudi Arabia was one of three countries that had never had a female competitor at the games. The other two countries, Qatar and Brunei, also selected women to compete for the first time. On 20 December 2021, the Saudi Arabian Olympic Committee and the Saudi Arabian Paralympic Committee were merged into one.

== 2012 Summer Olympics ==
In April 2012 the head of the Saudi Arabian Olympic Committee ruled against sending female participants to the Summer Olympics in London. The Olympic committee had previously released a list of potential candidates for the games which included females. Saudi Arabia's refusal to send women to the Olympics put them at odds with the Olympic charter which states that "any form of discrimination with regard to a country or a person on grounds of race, religion, politics, sex or otherwise is incompatible with belonging to the Olympic Movement".

The Olympic Committee's stance was later changed and it was announced that two female athletes, Sarah Attar (in the 800m) and will compete in the 800m and Wojdan Shaherkani (in the +78 kg Judo) judo would compete in London.

Shaherkani was selected despite not meeting Olympic qualifying standards, by specific invitation of the International Olympic Committee (IOC). Unlike most Olympic competitors, she did not win her spot through a national competition because Saudi Arabia strongly discourages women from participating in sport, and thus has no such competitions for women. Unlike other judoka in competition, who have attained black belts in the sport, she had only acquired a blue belt.

The IOC president Jacques Rogge said of Shahrkhani's and Attar's inclusion, "The I.O.C. has been working very closely with the Saudi Arabian Olympic Committee and I am pleased to see that our continued dialogue has come to fruition."

The Saudi Arabian Olympic Committee preferred not to promote Shahrkhani's participation. They also required that she "dress modestly, be accompanied by a male guardian and not mix with men" while in London for the 2012 Games. Additionally, her competition clothing has to comply with Sharia law.

On 30 July 2012, Shahrkhani said that she would withdraw from the event if she was not permitted to wear her hijab during bouts. Her father (who often speaks for her, partially because she does not know English) clarified that he wanted his daughter to compete, and that they wanted to make "new history for Saudi's women," but that she would not participate without a hijab. The next day the I.O.C. and the International Judo Federation announced that agreement had been reached on a headscarf that she could wear.

== See also ==
- Saudi Arabia at the Olympics
- Saudi Arabia at the Paralympics
