= Flag of Saudi Arabia =

Kingdom of Saudi Arabia (KSA)
- The Fluttering Green (Arabic: الخفاق الاخضر, romanized: al-Khaffaq al-Akhdar)
- Use: State and war flag, state and naval ensign
- Proportion: 2:3
- Adopted: 15 March 1973; 53 years ago
- Design: A green field with the Shahada (the Islamic creed) written in the Thuluth script in white above a horizontal sword, having its tip pointed to the left.
- Designed by: The Shura Council; Saleh al-Mansouf

The national flag of Saudi Arabia (Note: Arabic: علم المملكة العربية السعودية) is a green background with Arabic inscription and a sword in white, with an inscription of the shahada. The current design has been used by the government of Saudi Arabia since 15 March 1973.

== Design ==
The Arabic inscription on the flag, written in the calligraphic Thuluth script, is the shahada, the Islamic declaration of faith:

لَا إِلَٰهَ إِلَّا ٱللَّٰهُ
مُحَمَّدٌ رَسُولُ ٱللَّٰهِ

Translation:

There is no god but God
Muhammad is the Messenger of God

The flag's green background represents Islam, and the sword stands for safety and justice. The flag is manufactured with identical obverse and reverse sides, to ensure the shahada reads correctly, from right to left, from either side. The sword also points to the left on both sides, in the direction of the script.

The usual color of the flag's green was approximated by Album des pavillons as Pantone 330 C, while the color used on flags at United Nations is approximately Pantone 349. At the 2012 London Olympics, Pantone 355 was used.

The King Abdulaziz Foundation for Research and Archives (Darah) has clarified that attributing the Saudi flag's design to Hafiz Wahba is a common mistake. Darah stated that the design evolved from the First Saudi State until it was finalized by the Shura Council and officially approved by King Abdulaziz.

=== Design description ===
The background of the flag is green (Pantone 3425C or Pantone 19-6026 TCX) with the Shahada (in the Thuluth script) and sword drawn in white. The Shahada is 24 units long and 8 units wide, and the sword is centered with the length of 18 units. There is a dot next to the handle of said sword. The total length of the flag is 48 units, and the total width is 32 units with a ratio of 2:3 (width:length).

=== Construction sheet and color shades ===
Color scheme	Green	White	Construction sheet
Pantone (Fabric)	19-6026 TCX	240/240/236	
Pantone	3425C	White	
RGB	0/84/48	240/240/236	
Hexadecimal	#005430	#FFFFFF	
CMYK	89/15/97/56	0/0/2/6	
Sources			

=== Specifications in digital use ===
The Saudi Arabian Flag Usage Guide outlines the official measurements for flag crops in digital media, which come in three shapes: square, round, and diamond. It specifies using the RGB color system, and that the Shahada must occupy 70% of the image area.

square

round

diamond

== Use ==
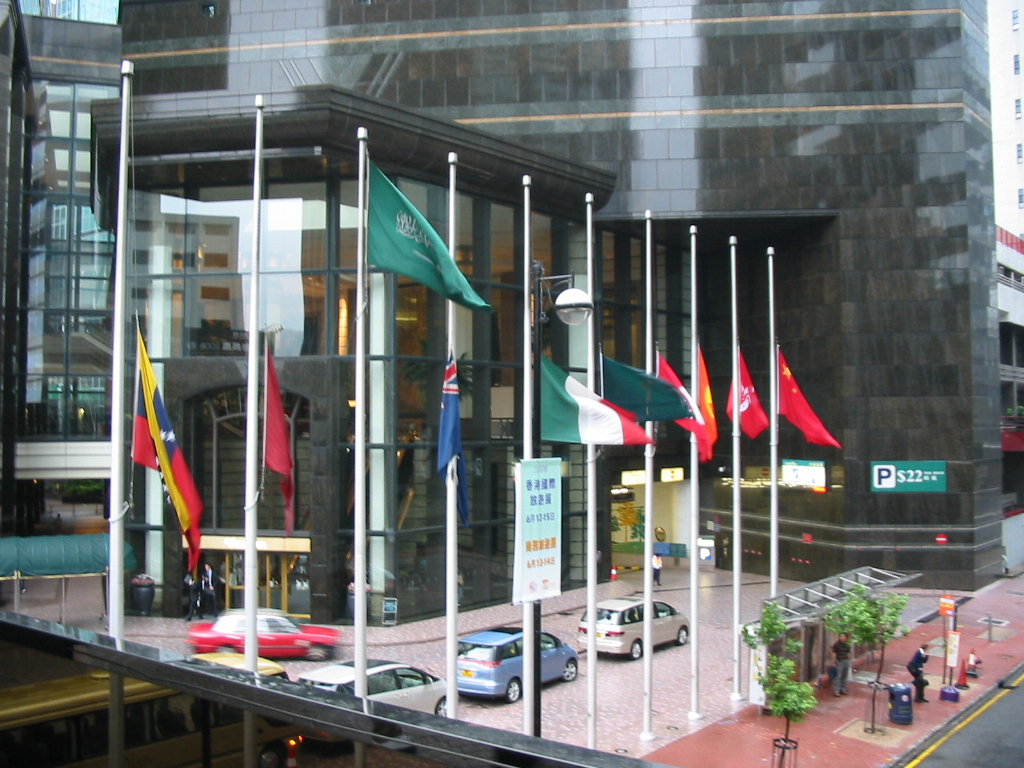
The flag of Saudi Arabia is never flown at half-mast as a sign of respect towards the holiness of the shahada, the sacred creed depicted on the flag.

Because the shahada is considered holy, the flag is not normally used on T-shirts or other items. Saudi Arabia protested against its inclusion on a planned football to be issued by FIFA, bearing all the flags of the participants of the 2002 FIFA World Cup. Saudi Arabian officials said that abusing the shahada was completely unacceptable and sacrilegious. Similarly, there was an attempt by the U.S. military to win favor with children of the Khost Province of Afghanistan by distributing footballs adorned with flags, including that of Saudi Arabia, ended in demonstrations. Each game of the 2026 FIFA World Cup featured giant flags of the two competing nations unfurled on the pitch before the match; in matches involving Saudi Arabia, both flags were physically lifted by their bearers at chest height. The Saudi Arabian flag was lifted because it was not allowed to touch the ground, and the opposing team's flag was lifted in the same manner to maintain consistency.

The flag is never lowered to half-mast as a sign of mourning because lowering it would be considered blasphemous and desecrating. Similarly, the flags of Afghanistan and Somaliland also should never be at half-mast, and neither is the flag of Iraq because it bears the takbir.

The normal flag cannot be hoisted vertically according to Saudi legislation. Special vertical flags are manufactured where both the inscription (the creed) and the emblem (the sword) are rotated, although this is rare, as most Arab countries traditionally do not hoist flags vertically.

== History ==
Flag used in use from 1938 to 1973

The precursor states to Saudi Arabia were Nejd and Hejaz. The state flag of Nejd followed today's Saudi flag pattern very closely. The state of Hejaz followed Pan-Arab patterns seen in flags like those of Sudan, Jordan, and Palestine. Caliphs such as Rashiduns, Umayyads and Abbasids used different colors, inscriptions and symbols. After the Siege of Baghdad in 1258, the primary caliphate became the Mamluk Sultanate. In 1517, the Ottomans invaded Egypt and inherited Hejaz and ruled it until the Arab Revolt (1916–1918). From 1902 until 1921 a different Arabic inscription was used. One of the primary opponents to the Saudis was the Emirate of Jabal Shammar of the Al Rashid family in the north of the peninsula, until their defeat in 1921.

The Al Saud, the ruling family of Saudi Arabia, has long been closely related with Muhammad ibn Abd al-Wahhab. He and the people who followed him, since the 18th century, had used the shahada on their flags. In 1921, Abdulaziz Abdulrahman Al-Saud, leader of the Al Saud and the future founder of the Kingdom of Saudi Arabia, added a sword to this flag. Variants with two swords and/or a white vertical stripe at the hoist were frequently used. By 1938, the flag had basically assumed its present form, except the sword had a different design (with a more curved blade) and it, along with the shahada above, took up more of the flag's space.

The design of the flag was not standardized prior to 15 March 1973 when its use became official.

== Royal Standard ==
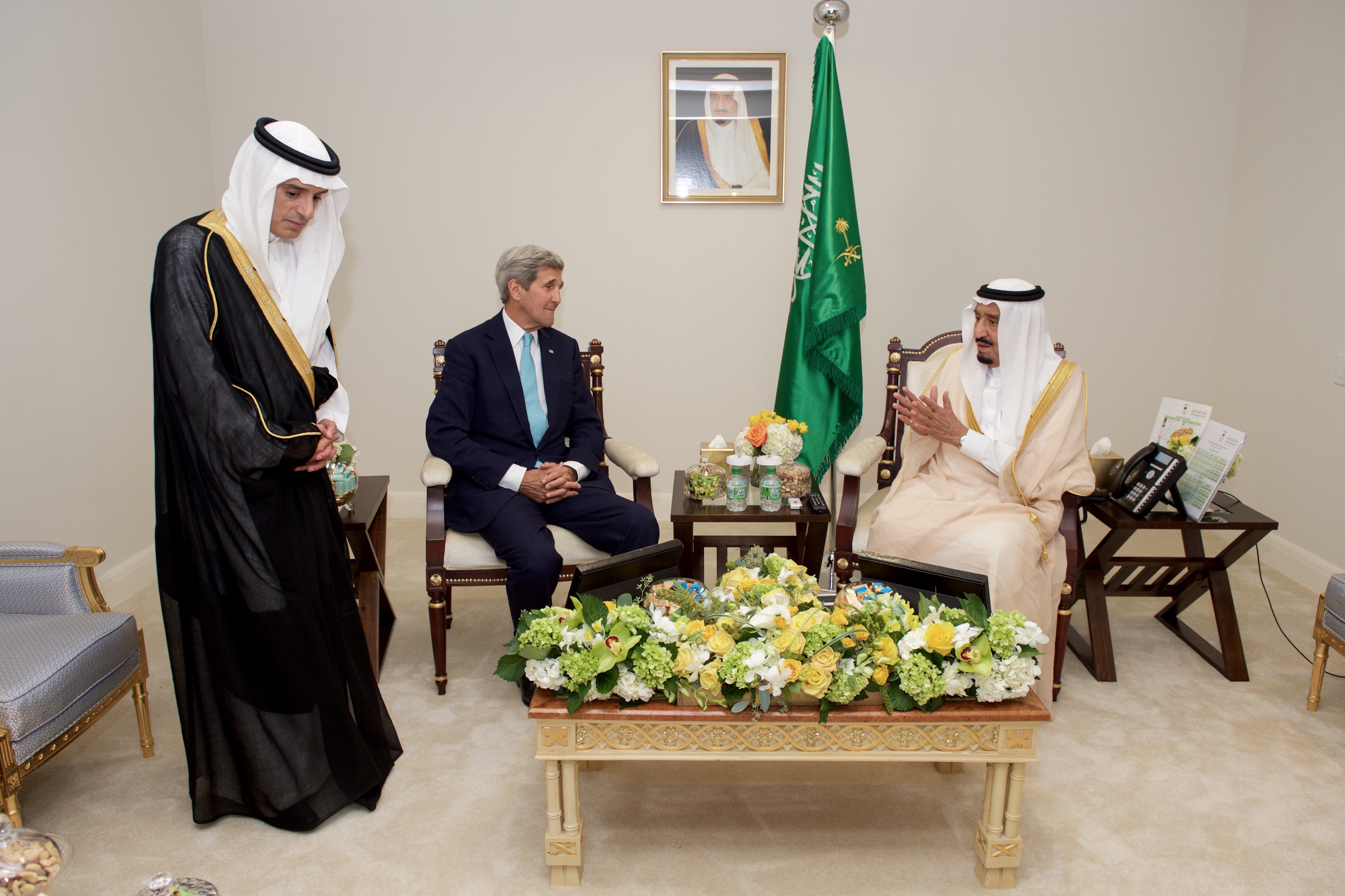
King Salman of Saudi Arabia and Saudi Foreign Minister Adel al-Jubeir meet with U.S. Secretary of State John Kerry in September 2015.

The Royal Standard consists of a green flag, with an Arabic inscription and a sword featured in white, and with the national emblem embroidered in gold in the lower right canton of the year 1973.

== See also ==
- List of Saudi Arabian flags
- Emblem of Saudi Arabia
- Saudi Flag Day
- National symbols of Saudi Arabia
- Salman of Saudi Arabia
- Faisal of Saudi Arabia
