= December 2011 in sports =

| << | December 2011 | | | | | >> |
| Su | Mo | Tu | We | Th | Fr | Sa |
| | | | | 1 | 2 | 3 |
| 4 | 5 | 6 | 7 | 8 | 9 | 10 |
| 11 | 12 | 13 | 14 | 15 | 16 | 17 |
| 18 | 19 | 20 | 21 | 22 | 23 | 24 |
| 25 | 26 | 27 | 28 | 29 | 30 | 31 |
Sports

This list shows notable sports-related deaths, events, and notable outcomes that occurred in December of 2011.

== Deaths in December ==
- 4: Sócrates

== Current sporting seasons ==
=== American football 2011 ===
- National Football League
- NCAA Division I FBS
- NCAA Division I FCS

=== Auto racing 2011 ===
- V8 Supercar

=== Basketball 2011–2012 ===
- NBA
- NCAA Division I men
- NCAA Division I women
- Euroleague
- EuroLeague Women
- Eurocup
- EuroChallenge
- Australia
- France
- Germany
- Greece
- Israel
- Italy
- Philippines
  - Philippine Cup
- Russia
- Spain
- Turkey

=== Cricket 2011–2012 ===
- Australia:
  - Sheffield Shield
  - Ryobi One-Day Cup

=== Football (soccer) 2011–2012 ===
National teams competitions

- 2014 FIFA World Cup qualification
- UEFA Women's Euro 2013 qualifying

International clubs competitions

- UEFA (Europe) Champions League
- UEFA Europa League
- UEFA Women's Champions League
- Copa Sudamericana
- CAF Confederation Cup
- CONCACAF (North & Central America) Champions League
- OFC (Oceania) Champions League

Domestic (national) competitions

- Argentina
- Australia
- Brazil
- England
- France
- Germany
- Iran
- Italy
- Japan
- Portugal
- Russia
- Scotland
- Spain

=== Golf 2011 ===
- European Tour

=== Ice hockey 2011–2012 ===
- National Hockey League
- Kontinental Hockey League
- Czech Extraliga
- Elitserien
- Canadian Hockey League:
  - OHL, QMJHL, WHL
- NCAA Division I men
- NCAA Division I women

=== Rugby union 2011–2012 ===
- Heineken Cup
- Amlin Challenge Cup
- Aviva Premiership
- RaboDirect Pro12
- LV= Cup
- Top 14
- Sevens World Series

=== Snooker 2011–2012 ===
- Players Tour Championship

=== Volleyball 2011–2012 ===
International clubs competitions

- Men's CEV Champions League
- Women's CEV Champions League

=== Winter sports ===
- Alpine Skiing World Cup
- Biathlon World Cup
- Bobsleigh World Cup
- Cross-Country Skiing World Cup
- ISU Grand Prix
- ISU Junior Grand Prix
- Freestyle Skiing World Cup
- Luge World Cup
- Nordic Combined World Cup
- Short Track Speed Skating World Cup
- Skeleton World Cup
- Ski Jumping World Cup
- Snowboard World Cup
- Speed Skating World Cup

== Days of the month ==
=== December 31, 2011 (Saturday) ===
==== Cross-country skiing ====
- Tour de Ski:
  - Stage 3 in Oberstdorf, Germany:
    - Men's sprint classic (all RUS): (gold) Nikita Kriukov 2:28.6 (silver) Alexey Petukhov +0.7 (bronze) Nikolay Morilov +1.2
    - Women's sprint classic: (gold) Justyna Kowalczyk (POL) 2:45.3 (silver) Marit Bjørgen (NOR) +3.2 (bronze) Astrid Uhrenholdt Jacobsen (NOR) +6.3

==== Ice hockey ====
- World Junior Championship in Canada; matchday 6 (teams in **bold** advance to the semifinals, teams in italics advance to the quarterfinals):
  - Group A in Calgary:
    - Slovakia 6–4 Switzerland
    - Russia 3–4 (OT) **Sweden**
      - Final standings: Sweden, Russia 10 points, Slovakia 6, Switzerland 4, Latvia 0.
  - Group B in Edmonton:
    - Czech Republic 0–4 Finland
    - **Canada** 3–2 United States
      - Final standings: Canada 12 points, Finland 9, Czech Republic 6, United States 3, Denmark 0.
- World Women's U18 Championship in Czech Republic; matchday 1:
  - Group A in Zlín:
    - Czech Republic 1–4 Sweden
    - United States 8–0 Russia
  - Group B in Přerov:
    - Canada 13–1 Switzerland
    - Finland 3–0 Germany

=== December 30, 2011 (Friday) ===
==== Cross-country skiing ====
- Tour de Ski:
  - Stage 2 in Oberhof, Germany:
    - Men's 15 km classic handicap start: (gold) Axel Teichmann (GER) 46:03.3 (silver) Petter Northug (NOR) 46:05.6 (bronze) Dario Cologna (SUI) 46:06.2
    - Women's 10 km classic handicap start: (gold) Justyna Kowalczyk (POL) 32:02.4 (silver) Therese Johaug (NOR) 32:02.6 (bronze) Marit Bjørgen (NOR) 32:11.5

==== Darts ====
- PDC World Championship in London, England, quarter-finals:
  - **Andy Hamilton** (ENG) 5–2 Kim Huybrechts (BEL)
  - John Part (CAN) 4–5 **James Wade** (ENG)
  - **Simon Whitlock** (AUS) 5–1 Gary Anderson (SCO)
  - **Adrian Lewis** (ENG) 5–3 Terry Jenkins (ENG)

==== Equestrianism ====
- Show jumping – World Cup, Western European League:
  - 8th competition in Mechelen, Belgium: (gold) Gregory Wathelet (BEL) on Copin van de Broy (silver) Kevin Staut (FRA) on Silvana (bronze) Rik Hemeryck (BEL) on Quarco de Kerambars

==== Ice hockey ====
- World Junior Championship in Canada; matchday 5:
  - Group A in Calgary:
    - Sweden 9–1 Slovakia
    - Switzerland 5–3 Latvia
  - Group B in Edmonton:
    - United States 2–5 Czech Republic
    - Finland 10–1 Denmark

==== Mixed martial arts ====
- UFC 141 in Las Vegas, United States:
  - Featherweight bout: **Jimy Hettes** (USA) def. Nam Phan (USA) via unanimous decision (30–25, 30–25, 30–26)
  - Light Heavyweight bout: **Alexander Gustafsson** (SWE) def. Vladimir Matyushenko (BLR) via TKO (punches)
  - Welterweight bout: **Johny Hendricks** (USA) def. Jon Fitch (USA) via KO (punch)
  - Lightweight bout: **Nate Diaz** (USA) def. Donald Cerrone (USA) via unanimous decision (30–27, 30–27, 29–28)
  - Heavyweight bout: **Alistair Overeem** (NED) def. Brock Lesnar (USA) via TKO (strikes)

==== Ski jumping ====
- Four Hills Tournament:
  - Stage 1 in Oberstdorf, Germany:
    - HS 137 (all AUT): (gold) Gregor Schlierenzauer 283.3 points (silver) Andreas Kofler 265.2 (bronze) Thomas Morgenstern 264.3

=== December 29, 2011 (Thursday) ===
==== Alpine skiing ====
- Men's World Cup in Bormio, Italy:
  - Downhill: (gold) Didier Défago (SUI) 2:01.81 (silver) Patrick Küng (SUI) 2:02.10 (bronze) Klaus Kröll (AUT) 2:02.23
- Women's World Cup in Lienz, Austria:
  - Slalom: (gold) Marlies Schild (AUT) 1:51.42 (silver) Tina Maze (SLO) 1:52.21 (bronze) Mikaela Shiffrin (USA) 1:52.72

==== Cricket ====
- India in Australia:
  - 1st Test in Melbourne, day 4: Australia 333 & 240; India 282 & 169. **Australia win by 122 runs; lead 4-match series 1–0.**
- Sri Lanka in South Africa:
  - 2nd Test in Durban, day 4: Sri Lanka 338 & 279; South Africa 168 & 241. **Sri Lanka win by 208 runs; 3-match series tied 1–1.**

==== Cross-country skiing ====
- Tour de Ski:
  - Stage 1 in Oberhof, Germany:
    - Men's 3.75 km free prologue: (gold) Petter Northug (NOR) 7:58.3 (silver) Dario Cologna (SUI) 7:59.0 (bronze) Maurice Manificat (FRA) 8:02.3
    - Women's 2.5 km free prologue: (gold) Justyna Kowalczyk (POL) 7:03.7 (silver) Marit Bjørgen (NOR) 7:04.1 (bronze) Hanna Brodin (SWE) 7:07.7

==== Darts ====
- PDC World Championship in London, England, third round:
  - **John Part** (CAN) 4–2 Kevin Painter (ENG)
  - **James Wade** (ENG) 4–0 Steve Farmer (ENG)
  - **Kim Huybrechts** (BEL) 4–1 Paul Nicholson (AUS)
  - **Simon Whitlock** (AUS) 4–3 Michael van Gerwen (NED)
  - Dave Chisnall (ENG) 0–4 **Andy Hamilton** (ENG)
  - **Gary Anderson** (SCO) 4–1 Colin Lloyd (ENG)

==== Football (soccer) ====
- Chilean Primera División Campeonato Clausura Final, second leg (first leg score in parentheses): **Universidad de Chile** 3–0 (0–0) Cobreloa. Universidad de Chile win 4–1 on points.
  - Universidad de Chile win their 15th league title.

==== Ice hockey ====
- World Junior Championship in Canada; matchday 4:
  - Group A in Calgary: Latvia 0–14 Russia
  - Group B in Edmonton: Denmark 2–10 Canada

=== December 28, 2011 (Wednesday) ===
==== Alpine skiing ====
- Women's World Cup in Lienz, Austria:
  - Giant slalom: (gold) Anna Fenninger (AUT) 2:16.08 (1:06.85, 1:09.23) (silver) Federica Brignone (ITA) 2:16.28 (1:06.78, 1:09.50) (bronze) Tessa Worley (FRA) 2:16.47 (1:07.26, 1:09.21)

==== Darts ====
- PDC World Championship in London, England (ENG unless stated):
  - Second round:
    - Mervyn King 1–4 **Michael van Gerwen** (NLD)
    - **Simon Whitlock** (AUS) 4–1 Steve Beaton
    - **Colin Lloyd** 4–1 Scott Rand
    - **Gary Anderson** (SCO) 4–2 Devon Petersen (RSA)
  - Third round:
    - **Adrian Lewis** 4–0 Wayne Jones
    - Justin Pipe 1–4 **Terry Jenkins**

==== Ice hockey ====
- World Junior Championship in Canada; matchday 3:
  - Group A in Calgary:
    - Sweden 4–3 (GWS) Switzerland
    - Russia 3–1 Slovakia
  - Group B in Edmonton:
    - United States 1–4 Finland
    - Canada 5–0 Czech Republic

=== December 27, 2011 (Tuesday) ===
==== Darts ====
- PDC World Championship in London, England, second round:
  - **Terry Jenkins** (ENG) 4–1 Co Stompé (NLD)
  - Richie Burnett (WAL) 1–4 **John Part** (CAN)
  - Vincent van der Voort (NLD) 3–4 **Andy Hamilton** (ENG)
  - James Richardson (ENG) 1–4 **Kim Huybrechts** (BEL)
  - Phil Taylor (ENG) 1–4 **Dave Chisnall** (ENG)
  - **Paul Nicholson** (AUS) 4–0 Alan Tabern (ENG)

==== Figure skating ====
- Russian Championships in Saransk:
  - Pairs: (gold) Vera Bazarova / Yuri Larionov 194.86 points (silver) Ksenia Stolbova / Fedor Klimov 182.13 (bronze) Anastasia Martiusheva / Alexei Rogonov 179.94
    - Bazarova & Larionov win their first national title.
  - Ladies: (gold) Adelina Sotnikova 193.71 points (silver) Yulia Lipnitskaya 191.65 (bronze) Alena Leonova 178.15
    - Sotnikova wins her third national title.

==== Ice hockey ====
- World Junior Championship in Canada, matchday 2:
  - Group A in Calgary: Slovakia 3–1 Latvia
  - Group B in Edmonton: Czech Republic 7–0 Denmark

=== December 26, 2011 (Monday) ===
==== American football ====
- NFL Monday Night Football, Week 16: New Orleans Saints 45, Atlanta Falcons 16
  - With 307 passing yards in the game, Saints quarterback Drew Brees breaks Dan Marino's single-season record from the 1984 season, of 5,084 yards.

==== Cricket ====
- Sri Lanka in South Africa, 2nd Test in Durban:
  - Sri Lanka's Mahela Jayawardene becomes the ninth player in history to score 10,000 runs in Test cricket, and the fifth fastest to reach that milestone.

==== Figure skating ====
- Russian Championships in Saransk:
  - Men: (gold) Evgeni Plushenko 259.67 points (silver) Artur Gachinski 249.58 (bronze) Sergei Voronov 240.79
    - Plushenko wins the title for the ninth time.
  - Ice dancing: (gold) Ekaterina Bobrova / Dmitri Soloviev 171.47 points (silver) Elena Ilinykh / Nikita Katsalapov 161.94 (bronze) Ekaterina Riazanova / Ilia Tkachenko 154.65
    - Bobrova & Soloviev win the title for the second time.

==== Football (soccer) ====
- Chilean Primera División Campeonato Clausura Final, first leg: Cobreloa 0–0 Universidad de Chile

==== Ice hockey ====
- World Junior Championship in Canada; matchday 1:
  - Group A in Calgary:
    - Latvia 4–9 Sweden
    - Switzerland 0–3 Russia
  - Group B in Edmonton:
    - Finland 1–8 Canada
    - Denmark 3–11 United States

=== December 25, 2011 (Sunday) ===
==== American football ====
- NFL Christmas game, Week 16: Green Bay Packers 35, Chicago Bears 21
  - The Packers' victory ensures home-field advantage throughout the playoffs, and allows the Atlanta Falcons to claim an NFC Wild Card place at the expense of the Bears, who are eliminated.

==== Basketball ====
- NBA season opening day:
  - New York Knicks 106, Boston Celtics 104
  - Miami Heat 105, Dallas Mavericks 94
  - Chicago Bulls 88, Los Angeles Lakers 87
  - Oklahoma City Thunder 97, Orlando Magic 89
  - Los Angeles Clippers 105, Golden State Warriors 86

=== December 23, 2011 (Friday) ===
==== Darts ====
- PDC World Championship in London, England, second round:
  - Mark Walsh (ENG) 3–4 **Kevin Painter** (ENG)
  - **James Wade** (ENG) 4–0 Jelle Klaasen (NED)
  - **Steve Farmer** (ENG) 4–2 Kevin Münch (GER)

=== December 22, 2011 (Thursday) ===
==== Basketball ====
- Euroleague Regular Season Matchday 10 (teams in **bold** advance to the Top 16):
  - Group A:
    - **Bennet Cantù** (Italy) 76–83 (Turkey) **Fenerbahçe Ülker**
    - **Gescrap Bizkaia** (Spain) 77–72 (Spain) Caja Laboral
    - SLUC Nancy (France) 74–79 (Greece) **Olympiacos**
      - Final standings: Fenerbahçe Ülker, Olympiacos 6–4, Bennet Cantù, Gescrap Bizkaia, Caja Laboral 5–5, SLUC Nancy 3–7.
  - Group C:
    - **Anadolu Efes** (Turkey) 66–75 (Spain) **Real Madrid**
    - Spirou Charleroi (Belgium) 69–86 (Israel) **Maccabi Tel Aviv**
    - Partizan Mt:s Belgrade (Serbia) 66–72 (Italy) **EA7 Emporio Armani**
      - Final standings: Real Madrid 8–2, Maccabi Tel Aviv 7–3, Anadolu Efes 5–5, EA7 Emporio Armani, Partizan Mt:s Belgrade 4–6, Spirou Charleroi 2–8.

==== Darts ====
- PDC World Championship in London, England, second round:
  - **Wayne Jones** (ENG) 4–0 Roland Scholten (NLD)
  - **Adrian Lewis** (ENG) 4–2 Robert Thornton (SCO)
  - Wes Newton (ENG) 3–4 **Justin Pipe** (ENG)

==== Football (soccer) ====
- (Bolivia) Liga de Fútbol Profesional Torneo Apertura Final, second leg (first leg score in parentheses): Universitario 1–1 (0–2) **The Strongest**. The Strongest win 4–1 on points.
  - The Strongest win their eighth league title.

==== Snowboarding ====
- World Cup in Carezza, Italy:
  - Slalom men: (gold) Benjamin Karl (AUT) (silver) Simon Schoch (SUI) (bronze) Siegfried Grabner (AUT)
    - Parallel slalom standings (after 4 of 11 events) & Overall standings: (1) Karl 3250 points (2) Roland Fischnaller (ITA) 2530 (3) Andreas Prommegger (AUT) 2350
  - Slalom women: (gold) Patrizia Kummer (SUI) (silver) Isabella Laböck (GER) (bronze) Anke Karstens (GER)
    - Parallel slalom standings (after 4 of 11 events) & Overall standings: (1) Fränzi Mägert-Kohli (SUI) 2460 points (2) Julia Dujmovits (AUT) 2150 (3) Amelie Kober (GER) 1860

=== December 21, 2011 (Wednesday) ===
==== Alpine skiing ====
- Men's World Cup in Flachau, Austria:
  - Slalom: (gold) Ivica Kostelić (CRO) 1:48.94 (55.11, 53.83) (silver) André Myhrer (SWE) 1:49.01 (55.46, 53.55) (bronze) Cristian Deville (ITA) 1:49.03 (55.25, 53.78)
    - Slalom standings (after 3 of 11 races): (1) Kostelić 245 points (2) Deville 180 (3) Myhrer 170
    - Overall standings (after 12 of 45 races): (1) Marcel Hirscher (AUT) 425 points (2) Aksel Lund Svindal (NOR) 416 (3) Ted Ligety (USA) 385

==== Basketball ====
- Euroleague Regular Season Matchday 10 (teams in **bold** advance to the Top 16):
  - Group B:
    - **Žalgiris Kaunas** (Lithuania) 87–76 (Croatia) KK Zagreb
    - **Panathinaikos** (Greece) 71–66 (Germany) Brose Baskets
    - **Unicaja** (Spain) 83–91 (Russia) **CSKA Moscow**
      - Final standings: CSKA Moscow 10–0, Panathinaikos 7–3, Žalgiris Kaunas, Unicaja 4–6, Brose Baskets 3–7, KK Zagreb 2–8.
  - Group D:
    - Asseco Prokom Gdynia (Poland) 53–79 (Italy) **Montepaschi Siena**
    - Union Olimpija Ljubljana (Slovenia) 63–76 (Russia) **UNICS Kazan**
    - **FC Barcelona Regal** (Spain) 79–50 (Turkey) **Galatasaray Medical Park**
      - Final standings: FC Barcelona Regal 9–1, Montepaschi Siena 8–2, UNICS Kazan 7–3, Galatasaray Medical Park 4–6, Asseco Prokom Gdynia, Union Olimpija Ljubljana 1–9.
- FIBA Africa Clubs Champions Cup in Salé, Morocco:
  - 3rd place game: (bronze) **AS Salé** (Morocco) 80–75 (Angola) Petro Atlético
  - Final: (gold) **Étoile Sportive du Sahel** (Tunisia) 82–60 (silver) (Angola) Primeiro de Agosto
    - Étoile Sportive du Sahel win the title for the first time.

==== Cricket ====
- Pakistan in Bangladesh:
  - 2nd Test in Mirpur, day 5: Bangladesh 338 & 234 (82.1 overs); Pakistan 470 & 107/3 (20.5 overs). **Pakistan win by 7 wickets; win 2-match series 2–0.**

==== Darts ====
- PDC World Championship in London, England:
  - Preliminary round: **Devon Petersen** (RSA) 4–3 José Oliveira de Sousa (POR)
  - First round:
    - Andy Smith (ENG) 0–3 **Scott Rand** (ENG)
    - **John Part** (CAN) 3–0 John Henderson (SCO)
    - **Simon Whitlock** (AUS) 3–0 Dennis Smith (ENG)
    - Steve Brown (ENG) 2–3 **Petersen**

==== Football (soccer) ====
- (Colombia) Categoría Primera A Torneo Finalización Final, second leg (first leg score in parentheses): Once Caldas 2–1 (2–3) **Junior**. 3–3 on points, 4–4 on aggregate; Junior win 4–2 on penalties.
  - Junior win their seventh league title.

==== Snowboarding ====
- World Cup in Carezza, Italy:
  - Giant slalom men: (gold) Roland Fischnaller (ITA) (silver) Benjamin Karl (AUT) (bronze) Rok Flander (SLO)
    - Giant slalom standings (after 3 of 11 events) & Overall standings: (1) Karl 2250 points (2) Fischnaller 2240 (3) Andreas Prommegger (AUT) 1900
  - Giant slalom women: (gold) Caroline Calvé (CAN) (silver) Amelie Kober (GER) (bronze) Marion Kreiner (AUT)
    - Giant slalom standings (after 3 of 11 events) & Overall standings: (1) Fränzi Mägert-Kohli (SUI) 2060 points (2) Kober 1660 (3) Julia Dujmovits (AUT) 1650

=== December 20, 2011 (Tuesday) ===
==== Alpine skiing ====
- Women's World Cup in Flachau, Austria:
  - Slalom: (gold) Marlies Schild (AUT) 1:51.53 (55.48, 56.05) (silver) Maria Höfl-Riesch (GER) 1:51.99 (56.01, 55.98) (bronze) Tina Maze (SLO) 1:52.35 (55.77, 56.58)
    - Slalom standings (after 3 of 10 races): (1) Schild 300 points (2) Kathrin Zettel (AUT) 155 (3) Höfl-Riesch 140
    - Overall standings (after 9 of 40 races): (1) Lindsey Vonn (USA) 554 points (2) Schild 324 (3) Viktoria Rebensburg (GER) 286

==== Basketball ====
- FIBA Africa Clubs Champions Cup in Salé, Morocco:
  - Semifinals:
    - AS Salé (Morocco) 78–81 (Tunisia) **Étoile Sportive du Sahel**
    - **Primeiro de Agosto** (Angola) 91–82 (Angola) Petro Atlético

==== Cricket ====
- Pakistan in Bangladesh:
  - 2nd Test in Mirpur, day 4: Bangladesh 338 & 114/5 (35 overs); Pakistan 470 (154.5 overs; Shakib Al Hasan 6/82). Bangladesh trail by 18 runs with 5 wickets remaining.
    - Shakib becomes the first Bangladesh player to score a hundred and take five wickets in an innings, in the same Test match.

==== Darts ====
- PDC World Championship in London, England:
  - Preliminary round: **Joe Cullen** (ENG) 4–2 Oliver Ferenc (SRB)
  - First round:
    - **Colin Lloyd** (ENG) 3–1 Darin Young (USA)
    - Colin Osborne (ENG) 1–3 **Michael van Gerwen** (NLD)
    - **Gary Anderson** (SCO) 3–2 Jyhan Artut (GER)
    - **Terry Jenkins** (ENG) 3–0 Cullen

==== Freestyle skiing ====
- World Cup in Méribel, France:
  - Dual moguls men: (gold) Mikaël Kingsbury (CAN) 20 points (silver) Anthony Benna (FRA) 15 (bronze) Sho Kashima (USA) 21
    - Moguls standings (after 2 of 13 events): (1) Kingsbury 200 points (2) Kashima & Benna 140
    - Overall standings: (1) Kingsbury 40 points (2) Egor Korotkov (RUS) 32 (3) Benna & Kashima 28
  - Dual moguls women: (gold) Hannah Kearney (USA) 21 points (silver) Justine Dufour-Lapointe (CAN) 14 (bronze) Heather McPhie (USA) 18
    - Moguls standings (after 2 of 13 events): (1) Kearney 200 points (2) Eliza Outtrim (USA) 106 (3) Nikola Sudová (CZE) 105
    - Overall standings: (1) Kearney & Kelsey Serwa (CAN) 40 points (3) Sanna Lüdi (SUI) 32

=== December 19, 2011 (Monday) ===
==== Alpine skiing ====
- Men's World Cup in Alta Badia, Italy:
  - Slalom: (gold) Marcel Hirscher (AUT) 1:47.16 (53.50, 53.66) (silver) Giuliano Razzoli (ITA) 1:47.72 (53.95, 53.77) (bronze) Felix Neureuther (GER) 1:47.76 (54.04, 53.72)
    - Slalom standings (after 2 of 11 races): (1) Hirscher 160 points (2) Ivica Kostelić (CRO) 145 (3) Cristian Deville (ITA) 120
    - Overall standings (after 11 of 45 races): (1) Hirscher 425 points (2) Aksel Lund Svindal (NOR) 416 (3) Ted Ligety (USA) 385

==== Basketball ====
- FIBA Africa Clubs Champions Cup in Salé, Morocco:
  - Quarterfinals:
    - ASB Mazembe (Democratic Republic of the Congo) 57–85 (Angola) **Primeiro de Agosto**
    - **Petro Atlético** (Angola) 86–80 (Angola) C.R.D. Libolo
    - C.R. Al Hoceima (Morocco) 51–88 (Morocco) **AS Salé**
    - Union Bank (Nigeria) 69–113 (Tunisia) **Étoile Sportive du Sahel**

==== Cricket ====
- Pakistan in Bangladesh:
  - 2nd Test in Mirpur, day 3: Bangladesh 338; Pakistan 292/3 (96 overs; Taufeeq Umar 130). Pakistan trail by 46 runs with 7 wickets remaining in the 1st innings.

==== Darts ====
- PDC World Championship in London, England:
  - Preliminary round: Per Laursen (DEN) 3–4 **Petri Korte** (FIN)
  - First round:
    - **Andy Hamilton** (ENG) 3–2 Antonio Alcinas (ESP)
    - **Mervyn King** (ENG) 3–0 Geoff Kime (AUS)
    - **Kevin Painter** (ENG) 3–1 Arron Monk (ENG)
    - **James Wade** (ENG) 3–1 Korte

==== Snooker ====
- Players Tour Championship – Event 11 in Sheffield, England (ENG unless stated):
  - Final: Martin Gould 3–4 **Tom Ford**
    - Ford wins his second professional title.
    - Order of Merit (after 11 of 12 events): (1) Judd Trump 30,400 (2) Ronnie O'Sullivan 29,600 (3) Neil Robertson (AUS) 28,100

=== December 18, 2011 (Sunday) ===
==== Alpine skiing ====
- Men's World Cup in Alta Badia, Italy (AUT unless stated):
  - Giant slalom: (gold) Massimiliano Blardone (ITA) 2:46.49 (1:29.07, 1:17.42) (silver) Hannes Reichelt 2:46.84 (1:28.91, 1:17.93) (bronze) Philipp Schörghofer 2:47.06 (1:28.78, 1:18.28)
    - Giant slalom standings (after 4 of 9 races): (1) Ted Ligety (USA) 330 points (2) Marcel Hirscher 265 (3) Schörghofer 182
    - Overall standings (after 10 of 45 races): (1) Aksel Lund Svindal (NOR) 416 points (2) Beat Feuz (SUI) 360 (3) Ligety 359
- Women's World Cup in Courchevel, France:
  - Slalom: (gold) Marlies Schild 1:42.64 (52.28, 50.36) (silver) Tanja Poutiainen (FIN) 1:44.51 (53.08, 51.43) (bronze) Kathrin Zettel 1:44.83 (54.03, 50.80)
    - Slalom standings (after 2 of 10 races): (1) Schild 200 points (2) Poutiainen 130 (3) Zettel 105
    - Overall standings (after 8 of 40 races): (1) Lindsey Vonn (USA) 522 points (2) Viktoria Rebensburg (GER) 286 (3) Elisabeth Görgl 269

==== American football ====
- NFL, Week 15:
  - Kansas City Chiefs 19, Green Bay Packers 14
    - The Packers suffer their first loss of the season, thus ending their bid to become the second team in NFL history with a perfect season, after the 1972 Miami Dolphins.
  - Indianapolis Colts 27, Tennessee Titans 13
    - The Colts win their first game of the season, and avoid becoming the second team in NFL history to have a winless 0–16 record.

==== Badminton ====
- BWF Super Series:
  - Super Series Masters Finals in Liuzhou, China (CHN unless stated):
    - Women's doubles: **Wang Xiaoli**/**Yu Yang** def. Ha Jung-eun/Kim Min-jung (KOR) 21–8, 21–12
    - Mixed doubles: **Zhang Nan**/**Zhao Yunlei** def. Xu Chen/Ma Jin 21–13, 21–15
    - Men's doubles: **Mathias Boe**/**Carsten Mogensen** (DEN) def. Chai Biao / Guo Zhendong 25–23, 21–7
    - Women's singles: **Wang Yihan** def. Saina Nehwal (IND) 18–21, 21–13, 21–13
    - Men's singles: **Lin Dan** def. Chen Long 21–12, 21–16

==== Biathlon ====
- World Cup 3 in Hochfilzen, Austria:
  - 2×6+2×7.5 km Mixed Relay: (gold) Russia (Olga Vilukhina, Olga Zaitseva, Alexey Volkov, Anton Shipulin) 1:13:33.4 (0+5) (silver) Czech Republic (Veronika Vítková, Gabriela Soukalová, Ondřej Moravec, Michal Šlesingr) 1:14:00.4 (0+3) (bronze) France (Marie Dorin Habert, Sophie Boilley, Alexis Bœuf, Simon Fourcade) 1:14:11.9 (0+9)

==== Bobsleigh ====
- World Cup in Winterberg, Germany:
  - 4-men: (gold) Germany (Thomas Florschütz, Gino Gerhardi, Kevin Kuske, Thomas Blaschek) 1:50.52 (55.39, 55.13) (silver) Russia (Alexandr Zubkov, Filipp Yegorov, Dmitry Trunenkov, Nikolay Hrenkov) 1:50.54 (55.38, 55.16) (bronze) Latvia (Oskars Melbārdis, Helvijs Lusis, Arvis Vilkaste, Janis Strenga) 1:50.65 (55.39, 55.26)
    - Standings (after 3 of 8 races): (1) Florschütz 625 points (2) Zubkov 619 (3) Steven Holcomb (USA) 578

==== Cricket ====
- Pakistan in Bangladesh:
  - 2nd Test in Mirpur, day 2: Bangladesh 338 (107.2 overs; Shakib Al Hasan 144); Pakistan 87/1 (27 overs). Pakistan trail by 251 runs with 9 wickets remaining in the 1st innings.

==== Cross-country skiing ====
- World Cup in Rogla, Slovenia:
  - Men's sprint freestyle: (gold) Dario Cologna (SUI) 2:27.7 (silver) Nikolay Morilov (RUS) 2:28.0 (bronze) Anders Gløersen (NOR) 2:29.0
    - Sprint standings (after 4 of 13 races): (1) Alexei Petukhov (RUS) 237 points (2) Teodor Peterson (SWE) 207 (3) Cologna 160
    - Overall standings (after 10 of 37 races): (1) Petter Northug (NOR) 600 points (2) Cologna 508 (3) Maurice Manificat (FRA) 266
  - Women's sprint freestyle: (gold) Maiken Caspersen Falla (NOR) 2:15.8 (silver) Chandra Crawford (CAN) 2:16.2 (bronze) Ida Ingemarsdotter (SWE) 2:17.3
    - Sprint standings (after 4 of 13 races): (1) Kikkan Randall (USA) 280 points (2) Falla 216 (3) Natalya Matveyeva (RUS) 212
    - Overall standings (after 10 of 37 races, all NOR): (1) Marit Bjørgen 582 points (2) Vibeke Skofterud 479 (3) Therese Johaug 471

==== Darts ====
- PDC World Championship in London, England:
  - Preliminary round: Connie Finnan (IRL) 3–4 **Warren French** (NZL)
  - First round:
    - Brendan Dolan (NIR) 0–3 **Kim Huybrechts** (BEL)
    - Mark Dudbridge (ENG) 0–3 **Dave Chisnall** (ENG)
    - Raymond van Barneveld (NLD) 0–3 **James Richardson** (ENG)
    - **Mark Walsh** (ENG) 3–1 French

==== Equestrianism ====
- Show jumping – World Cup, Western European League:
  - 7th competition in London, United Kingdom: (gold) Ben Maher (GBR) on Tripple X III (silver) Marcus Ehning (GER) on Sabrina (bronze) Dermott Lennon (IRL) on Hallmark Elite
    - Standings (after 7 of 12 competitions): (1) Rolf-Göran Bengtsson (SWE) 71 points (2) Steve Guerdat (SUI) 51 (3) Nick Skelton (GBR) 48

==== Football (soccer) ====
- FIFA Club World Cup in Yokohama, Japan:
  - Match for third place: Kashiwa Reysol (Japan) 0–0 (3–5 pen.) (bronze) (Qatar) **Al-Sadd**
  - Final: (silver) Santos (Brazil) 0–4 (gold) (Spain) **Barcelona**
    - Barcelona win the Cup for the second time in three years.
- (Paraguay) Paraguayan Primera División Torneo Clausura, final matchday:
  - Olimpia 2–1 Rubio Ñu
  - Sol de América 2–2 Cerro Porteño
    - Final standings: Olimpia 46 points, Cerro Porteño 43.
    - Olimpia win the title for the 39th time.
- (Costa Rica) Costa Rican Primera División Campeonato de Invierno Final, second leg (first leg score in parentheses): Herediano 1–1 (1–1) **Alajuelense**. 2–2 on aggregate; Alajuelense win 6–5 on penalties.
  - Alajuelense win the title for the 27th time.
- (Colombia) Categoría Primera A Torneo Finalización Final, first leg: Junior 3–2 Once Caldas
- (Bolivia) Liga de Fútbol Profesional Torneo Apertura Final, first leg: The Strongest 2–0 Universitario.

==== Freestyle skiing ====
- World Cup in Innichen, Italy:
  - Ski cross men: (gold) Andreas Matt (AUT) (silver) Egor Korotkov (RUS) (bronze) Alex Fiva (SUI)
    - Ski cross standings (after 2 of 11 races): (1) Korotkov 160 points (2) Matt 132 (3) David Duncan (CAN) 110
    - Overall standings: (1) Korotkov 32 points (2) Matt 26 (3) Duncan 22
  - Ski cross women: (gold) Kelsey Serwa (CAN) (silver) Sanna Lüdi (SUI) (bronze) Katrin Müller (SUI)
    - Ski cross standings (after 2 of 11 races): (1) Serwa 200 points (2) Lüdi 160 (3) Müller 86
    - Overall standings: (1) Serwa 40 points (2) Lüdi 32 (3) Hannah Kearney (USA) & Britta Sigourney (USA) 20

==== Handball ====
- World Women's Championship in São Paulo, Brazil:
  - Seventh place match: Angola 29–32 **Croatia**
  - Fifth place match: Russia 20–36 **Brazil**
  - Third place match: Denmark 18–24 (bronze) **Spain**
  - Final: (silver) France 24–32 (gold) **Norway**
    - Norway win the title for the second time.

==== Nordic combined ====
- World Cup in Seefeld, Austria:
  - HS 109 / 10 km: (gold) Jason Lamy-Chappuis (FRA) 27:41.9 (silver) Alessandro Pittin (ITA) 27:45.8 (bronze) Jørgen Graabak (NOR) 27:49.0
    - Standings (after 8 of 23 races): (1) Lamy-Chappuis 554 points (2) Tino Edelmann (GER) 381 (3) Akito Watabe (JPN) 361

==== Rugby union ====
- Heineken Cup pool stage Matchday 4:
  - Pool 1:
    - Munster (Ireland) 19–13 (Wales) Scarlets
    - Northampton Saints (England) 45–0 (France) Castres
      - Standings (after 4 matches): Munster 16 points, Scarlets 11, Northampton Saints 8, Castres 6.
  - Pool 6: Toulouse (France) 24–31 (England) Harlequins
    - Standings (after 4 matches): Toulouse 13 points, Harlequins 12, (England) Gloucester 9, (Ireland) Connacht 2.
- Amlin Challenge Cup pool stage Matchday 4:
  - Pool 4: Newport Gwent Dragons (Wales) 19–23 (England) Exeter Chiefs
    - Standings (after 4 matches): (France) Perpignan, Exeter Chiefs 14 points, Newport Gwent Dragons 10, (Italy) Cavalieri Prato 0.
  - Pool 5: Sale Sharks (England) 41–21 (France) Agen
    - Standings (after 4 matches): (France) Brive 18 points, Sale Sharks 15, Agen 5, (Spain) La Vila 0.

==== Sailing ====
- World Championships in Perth, Australia:
  - Women's 470: (gold) Tara Pacheco, Berta Betanzos (ESP) 63 points (silver) Hannah Mills, Saskia Clark (GBR) 68 (bronze) Jo Aleh, Polly Powrie (NZL) 73
  - Men's 49er: (gold) Nathan Outteridge, Iain Jensen (AUS) 91 points (silver) Peter Burling, Blair Tuke (NZL) 112 (bronze) Emil Toft Nielssen, Simon Toft Nielssen (DEN) 112
  - Men's RS:X: (gold) Dorian van Rijsselberghe (NED) 33 points (silver) Piotr Myszka (POL) 40 (bronze) Nimrod Mashiach (ISR) 52
  - Men's Laser: (gold) Tom Slingsby (AUS) 37 points (silver) Nick Thompson (GBR) 56 (bronze) Andrew Murdock (NZL) 59

==== Snooker ====
- Players Tour Championship – Event 11 in Sheffield, England: Jamie Cope (ENG) compiles the 85th official maximum break, and becomes the sixth person to compile more than two official maximum breaks.

==== Ski jumping ====
- Men's World Cup in Engelberg, Switzerland:
  - HS 137: (gold) Andreas Kofler (AUT) 264.7 points (silver) Kamil Stoch (POL) 260.8 (bronze) Anders Bardal (NOR) 260.5
    - Standings (after 7 of 27 events): (1) Kofler 508 points (2) Bardal 390 (3) Gregor Schlierenzauer (AUT) 376

=== December 17, 2011 (Saturday) ===
==== Alpine skiing ====
- Men's World Cup in Val Gardena, Italy:
  - Downhill: Cancelled due to strong winds.
- Women's World Cup in Courchevel, France:
  - Giant slalom: Cancelled due to heavy snow.

==== Basketball ====
- FIBA Africa Clubs Champions Cup in Salé, Morocco (teams in **bold** advance to the quarterfinals):
  - Group A:
    - **ASB Mazembe** (Democratic Republic of the Congo) 74–62 (Burundi) Urunani
    - **Union Bank** (Nigeria) 72–93 (Morocco) **AS Salé**
    - Al Ahly (Libya) 72–85 (Angola) **C.R.D. Libolo**
      - Final standings: AS Salé 10 points, C.R.D. Libolo 9, Union Bank 8, ASB Mazembe 7, Al Ahly 6, Urunani 5.
  - Group B:
    - Royal Hoopers (Nigeria) 63–88 (Angola) **Petro Atlético**
    - **Étoile Sportive du Sahel** (Tunisia) 127–61 (Equatorial Guinea) Malabo Kings
    - **C.R. Al Hoceima** (Morocco) 62–70 (Angola) **Primeiro de Agosto**
      - Final standings: Primeiro de Agosto 10 points, Étoile Sportive du Sahel 9, Petro Atlético 8, C.R. Al Hoceima 7, Malabo Kings 6, Royal Hoopers 4.

==== Biathlon ====
- World Cup 3 in Hochfilzen, Austria:
  - 12.5 km pursuit men: (gold) Andreas Birnbacher (GER) 35:40.3 (0+0+0+0) (silver) Ole Einar Bjørndalen (NOR) 35:40.5 (0+0+0+0) (bronze) Simon Fourcade (FRA) 35:41.6 (1+0+0+0)
    - Pursuit standings (after 3 of 8 races): (1) Tarjei Bø (NOR) 140 points (2) Emil Hegle Svendsen (NOR) 131 (3) Birnbacher & Benjamin Weger (SUI) 124
    - Overall standings (after 7 of 26 races): (1) Bø 308 points (2) Martin Fourcade (FRA) 289 (3) Svendsen 242
  - 10 km pursuit women: (gold) Olga Zaitseva (RUS) 31:52.2 (0+0+0+0) (silver) Helena Ekholm (SWE) 32:21.3 (0+0+0+1) (bronze) Darya Domracheva (BLR) 32:36.9 (1+1+0+1)
    - Pursuit standings (after 3 of 8 races): (1) Zaitseva 140 points (2) Tora Berger (NOR) 135 (3) Domracheva 133
    - Overall standings (after 7 of 26 races): (1) Magdalena Neuner (GER) 336 points (2) Domracheva 327 (3) Kaisa Mäkäräinen (FIN) 301

==== Bobsleigh ====
- World Cup in Winterberg, Germany (GER unless stated):
  - 2-women: (gold) Cathleen Martini/Janine Tischer 1:56.32 (58.20, 58.12) (silver) Anja Schneiderheinze-Stöckel/Lisette Thöne 1:56.60 (57.88, 58.72) (bronze) Fabienne Meyer/Hanne Schenk (SUI) 1:56.73 (58.20, 58.53)
    - Standings (after 3 of 8 races): (1) Schneiderheinze-Stöckel 627 points (2) Martini 619 (3) Meyer 576
  - 2-men: (gold) Thomas Florschütz/Kevin Kuske 1:52.98 (56.81, 56.17) (silver) Beat Hefti/Thomas Lamparter (SUI) 1:53.22 (57.06, 56.16) (bronze) Oskars Melbārdis/Daumants Dreiškens (LAT) 1:53.43 (57.34, 56.09)
    - Standings (after 3 of 8 races): (1) Florschütz 660 points (2) Hefti 635 (3) Maximilian Arndt 552

==== Cricket ====
- Sri Lanka in South Africa:
  - 1st Test in Centurion, day 3: Sri Lanka 180 & 150 (39.1 overs; Vernon Philander 5/49); South Africa 411 (122 overs). **South Africa win by an innings & 81 runs; lead 3-match series 1–0.**
- Pakistan in Bangladesh:
  - 2nd Test in Mirpur, day 1: Bangladesh 234/5 (68 overs; Shakib Al Hasan 108*); Pakistan.

==== Cross-country skiing ====
- World Cup in Rogla, Slovenia:
  - Men's 15 km classic mass start: (gold) Petter Northug (NOR) 42:42.7 (silver) Dario Cologna (SUI) 42:42.9 (bronze) Alexey Poltoranin (KAZ) 42:43.8
    - Distance standings (after 5 of 21 races): (1) Northug 340 points (2) Maurice Manificat (FRA) 202 (3) Cologna 188
    - Overall standings (after 9 of 37 races): (1) Northug 600 points (2) Cologna 408 (3) Manificat 266
  - Women's 10 km classic mass start: (gold) Justyna Kowalczyk (POL) 32:49.7 (silver) Therese Johaug (NOR) 33:11.8 (bronze) Vibeke Skofterud (NOR) 33:17.1
    - Distance standings (after 5 of 21 races): (1) Marit Bjørgen (NOR) 296 points (2) Skofterud 294 (3) Johaug 281
    - Overall standings (after 9 of 37 races): (1) Bjørgen 582 points (2) Skofterud 479 (3) Johaug 471

==== Darts ====
- PDC World Championship in London, England:
  - Preliminary round:
    - Dietmar Burger (AUT) 0–4 **Christian Perez** (PHI)
    - **Kevin Münch** (GER) 4–2 Lee Choon Peng (MYS)
  - First round:
    - Peter Wright (SCO) 1–3 **Jelle Klaasen** (NLD)
    - Ronnie Baxter (ENG) 2–3 **Steve Farmer** (ENG)
    - **Robert Thornton** (SCO) 3–1 Ian White (ENG)
    - **Alan Tabern** (ENG) 3–1 Perez
    - **Steve Beaton** (ENG) 3–2 Magnus Caris (SWE)
    - **Vincent van der Voort** (NLD) 3–2 Mark Hylton (ENG)
    - **Paul Nicholson** (AUS) 3–1 Mensur Suljović (AUT)
    - Denis Ovens (ENG) w/d–w/o **Münch**

==== Football (soccer) ====
- (Ecuador) Campeonato Ecuatoriano de Fútbol Serie A Finals, second leg (first leg score in parentheses): **Deportivo Quito** 1–0 (1–0) Emelec. Deportivo Quito win 2–0 on aggregate.
  - Deportivo Quito win the title for the fifth time.

==== Freestyle skiing ====
- World Cup in Innichen, Italy:
  - Ski cross men: (gold) Brady Leman (CAN) (silver) Egor Korotkov (RUS) (bronze) David Duncan (CAN)
    - Overall standings: (1) Mikaël Kingsbury (CAN), Wing Tai Barrymore (USA) & Leman 20 points
  - Ski cross women: (gold) Kelsey Serwa (CAN) (silver) Sanna Lüdi (SUI) (bronze) Marielle Thompson (CAN)
    - Overall standings: (1) Hannah Kearney (USA), Britta Sigourney (USA) & Serwa 20 points

==== Luge ====
- World Cup 3 in Calgary, Canada (GER unless stated):
  - Men: (gold) Andi Langenhan 1:29.406 (44.716, 44.690) (silver) Felix Loch 1:29.500 (44.947, 44.553) (bronze) David Möller 1:29.657 (44.808, 44.849)
    - Standings (after 3 of 9 races): (1) Loch 285 points (2) Möller 225 (3) Langenhan 210
  - Doubles: (gold) Tobias Wendl/Tobias Arlt 1:27.661 (43.795, 43.866) (silver) Andreas Linger/Wolfgang Linger (AUT) 1:27.693 (43.831, 43.862) (bronze) Toni Eggert/Sascha Benecken 1:27.829 (43.912, 43.917)
    - Standings (after 3 of 9 races): (1) Linger/Linger 255 points (2) Peter Penz/Georg Fischler (AUT) 211 (3) Wendl/Arlt 210

==== Mixed martial arts ====
- Strikeforce: Melendez vs. Masvidal in San Diego, California, United States:
  - Lightweight Championship bout: Gilbert Melendez (USA) (c) def. Jorge Masvidal (USA) via unanimous decision (50–45, 50–45, 49–46)
  - Women's Featherweight Championship bout: Cristiane Santos (BRA) (c) def. Hiroko Yamanaka (JPN) via TKO (punches)
  - Light Heavyweight bout: Gegard Mousasi (ARM) def. Ovince St. Preux (HAI) via unanimous decision (29–28, 29–28, 29–28)
  - Lightweight bout: K. J. Noons (USA) def. Billy Evangelista (USA) via unanimous decision (29–28, 29–28, 29–28)

==== Nordic combined ====
- World Cup in Seefeld, Austria:
  - HS 109 / 10 km: (gold) Jason Lamy-Chappuis (FRA) 29:14.5 (silver) Akito Watabe (JPN) 29:15.5 (bronze) Alessandro Pittin (ITA) 29:18.0
    - Standings (after 7 of 23 races): (1) Lamy-Chappuis 454 points (2) Tino Edelmann (GER) 368 (3) Watabe 316

==== Rugby union ====
- Heineken Cup pool stage Matchday 4:
  - Pool 2: London Irish (England) 19–25 (France) Racing Métro
    - Standings (after 4 matches): (Wales) Cardiff Blues, (Scotland) Edinburgh 13 points, London Irish 8, Racing Métro 7.
  - Pool 3:
    - Montpellier (France) 13–13 (Scotland) Glasgow Warriors
    - Leinster (Ireland) 52–27 (England) Bath
      - Standings (after 4 matches): Leinster 16 points, Glasgow Warriors 10, Bath, Montpellier 6.
  - Pool 4:
    - Leicester Tigers (England) 23–19 (France) Clermont
    - Aironi (Italy) 20–46 (Ireland) Ulster
      - Standings (after 4 matches): Ulster 14 points, Leicester Tigers 12, Clermont 11, Aironi 0.
  - Pool 6: Gloucester (England) 23–19 (Ireland) Connacht
    - Standings: (France) Toulouse 12 points (3 matches), Gloucester 9 (4), (England) Harlequins 8 (3), Connacht 2 (4).
- Amlin Challenge Cup pool stage Matchday 4:
  - Pool 1: Worcester Warriors (England) 57–13 (Romania) București Wolves
    - Standings (after 4 matches): (France) Stade Français 19 points, Worcester Warriors 15, București Wolves 5, (Italy) Crociati Parma 0.
  - Pool 2:
    - Petrarca Padova (Italy) 3–43 (France) Lyon
    - Toulon (France) 36–10 (England) Newcastle Falcons
      - Standings (after 4 matches): Toulon 15 points, Newcastle Falcons 13, Lyon 10, Petrarca Padova 0.
  - Pool 4: Cavalieri Prato (Italy) 13–30 (France) Perpignan
    - Standings: Perpignan 14 points (4 matches), Exeter Chiefs 10 (3), Newport Gwent Dragons 9 (3), Cavalieri Prato 0 (4).

==== Sailing ====
- World Championships in Perth, Australia:
  - Men's Star: (gold) Robert Scheidt, Bruno Prada (BRA) 45 points, (silver) Robert Stanjek, Frithjof Kleen (GER) 61 (bronze) Mark Mendelblatt, Brian Fatih (USA) 73

==== Skeleton ====
- World Cup in Winterberg, Germany:
  - Men: (gold) Martins Dukurs (LAT) 57.90 (silver) Frank Rommel (GER) 58.22 (bronze) Aleksandr Tretyakov (RUS) 58.29
    - Standings (after 3 of 8 races): (1) Dukurs 675 points (2) Tretyakov 610 (3) Rommel 586
  - Women: (gold) Amy Gough (CAN) 1:00.16 (silver) Katharina Heinz (GER) 1:00.24 (bronze) Marion Thees (GER) 1:00.26
    - Standings (after 3 of 8 races): (1) Olga Potylitsina (RUS) 585 points (2) Mellisa Hollingsworth (CAN) 545 (3) Thees 536

==== Ski jumping ====
- Men's World Cup in Engelberg, Switzerland (AUT unless stated):
  - HS 137: (gold) Anders Bardal (NOR) 266.2 points (silver) Martin Koch 258.1 (bronze) Thomas Morgenstern 257.4
    - Standings (after 6 of 27 events): (1) Andreas Kofler 408 points (2) Bardal 330 (3) Gregor Schlierenzauer 326

==== Snooker ====
- Players Tour Championship – Event 11 in Sheffield, England: Ding Junhui (CHN) compiles the 84th official maximum break, and becomes the fourth person to compile more than three official maximum breaks.

==== Snowboarding ====
- World Cup in Telluride, United States:
  - Men's snowboard cross team: (gold) Pierre Vaultier/Xavier de Le Rue (FRA) (silver) Nick Baumgartner/Jonathan Cheever (USA) (bronze) Joachim Havikhagen/Stian Sivertzen (NOR)
  - Women's snowboard cross team: (gold) Nelly Moenne Loccoz/Déborah Anthonioz (FRA) (silver) Dominique Maltais/Maëlle Ricker (CAN) (bronze) Lindsey Jacobellis/Callan Chythlook-Sifsof (USA)
- World Cup in Ruka, Finland:
  - Halfpipe men: (gold) Markus Malin (SWE) 94.0 points (silver) Steve Krijbolder (NED) 88.0 (bronze) Aleksi Kumpulainen (FIN) 83.3
    - Halfpipe standings: (1) Janne Korpi (FIN) 1600 points (2) Malin 1150 (3) Ryō Aono (JPN) 1040
    - Freestyle Overall standings: (1) Korpi 2620 points (2) Dimi de Jong (NED) 1480 (3) Niklas Mattsson (SWE) 1160
  - Halfpipe women: (gold) Lucile Lefèvre (FRA) 81.3 points (silver) Emma Bernard (FRA) 80.0 (bronze) Ella Suitiala (FIN) 67.3
    - Halfpipe standings & Freestyle Overall standings: (1) Lefèvre 1290 points (2) Ursina Haller (SUI) 1200 (3) Queralt Castellet (ESP) 1180

=== December 16, 2011 (Friday) ===
==== Alpine skiing ====
- Men's World Cup in Val Gardena, Italy:
  - Super giant slalom: (gold) Beat Feuz (SUI) 1:21.51 (silver) Bode Miller (USA) 1:21.81 (bronze) Kjetil Jansrud (NOR) 1:21.95
    - Super-G standings (after 3 of 8 races): (1) Aksel Lund Svindal (NOR) 230 points (2) Feuz 171 (3) Didier Cuche (SUI) 121
    - Overall standings (after 9 of 45 races): (1) Svindal 384 points (2) Feuz 360 (3) Ted Ligety (USA) 309

==== Basketball ====
- FIBA Africa Clubs Champions Cup in Salé, Morocco:
  - Group A:
    - C.R.D. Libolo (Angola) 83–56 (Burundi) Urunani
    - Al Ahly (Libya) 61–83 (Nigeria) Union Bank
    - AS Salé (Morocco) 70–56 (Democratic Republic of the Congo) ASB Mazembe
      - Standings (after 4 games): AS Salé 8 points, C.R.D. Libolo, Union Bank 7, ASB Mazembe, Al Ahly 5, Urunani 4.
  - Group B:
    - Malabo Kings (Equatorial Guinea) 51–101 (Angola) Petro Atlético
    - Étoile Sportive du Sahel (Tunisia) 84–62 (Morocco) C.R. Al Hoceima
    - Primeiro de Agosto (Angola) 95–69 (Nigeria) Royal Hoopers
      - Standings (after 4 games): Primeiro de Agosto 8 points, Étoile Sportive du Sahel 7, Petro Atlético, C.R. Al Hoceima 6, Malabo Kings 5, Royal Hoopers 3.

==== Biathlon ====
- World Cup 3 in Hochfilzen, Austria:
  - 7.5 km sprint women: (gold) Olga Zaitseva (RUS) 20:36.6 (0+1) (silver) Darya Domracheva (BLR) 20:50.5 (1+1) (bronze) Helena Ekholm (SWE) 21:06.8 (1+0)
    - Sprint standings (after 3 of 10 races): (1) Magdalena Neuner (GER) 163 points (2) Kaisa Mäkäräinen (FIN) & Domracheva 134
    - Overall standings (after 6 of 26 races): (1) Neuner 307 points (2) Domracheva 279 (3) Mäkäräinen 261

==== Cricket ====
- Sri Lanka in South Africa:
  - 1st Test in Centurion, day 2: Sri Lanka 180; South Africa 389/9 (118 overs). South Africa lead by 209 runs with 1 wicket remaining in the 1st innings.

==== Darts ====
- PDC World Championship in London, England:
  - Preliminary round: **Haruki Muramatsu** (JPN) 4–2 Dennis Nilsson (SWE)
  - First round:
    - **Justin Pipe** (ENG) 3–1 Sean Reed (AUS)
    - **Co Stompé** (NED) 3–0 Michael Smith (ENG)
    - **Wes Newton** (ENG) 3–0 Kurt van de Rijck (BEL)
    - **Phil Taylor** (ENG) 3–0 Muramatsu

==== Handball ====
- World Women's Championship in São Paulo, Brazil:
  - 5th–8th semifinals:
    - **Russia** 41–31 Angola
    - Croatia 31–32 **Brazil**
  - Semifinals:
    - **France** 28–23 Denmark
    - **Norway** 30–22 Spain

==== Luge ====
- World Cup 3 in Calgary, Canada:
  - Women: (gold) Alex Gough (CAN) 1:34.212 (47.153, 47.059) (silver) Tatjana Hüfner (GER) 1:34.324 (47.176, 47.148) (bronze) Tatiana Ivanova (RUS) 1:34.724 (47.290, 47.434)
    - Standings (after 3 of 9 races): (1) Hüfner 270 points (2) Gough 230 (3) Natalie Geisenberger (GER) 210

==== Nordic combined ====
- World Cup in Seefeld, Austria:
  - HS 109 / Team sprint: (gold) Sébastien Lacroix/Jason Lamy-Chappuis (FRA) 41:30.1 (silver) Lukas Runggaldier/Alessandro Pittin (ITA) 41:32.3 (bronze) Mikko Kokslien/Magnus Krog (NOR) 41:34.2

==== Rugby union ====
- Heineken Cup pool stage Matchday 4:
  - Pool 2: Edinburgh (Scotland) 19–12 (Wales) Cardiff Blues
    - Standings: Edinburgh, Cardiff Blues 13 points (4 matches), (England) London Irish 7 (3), (France) Racing Métro 3 (3).
  - Pool 5:
    - Ospreys (Wales) 13–16 (England) Saracens
    - Biarritz (France) 29–12 (Italy) Benetton Treviso
      - Standings (after 4 matches): Saracens 14 points, Biarritz 12, Ospreys 8, Benetton Treviso 6.

==== Sailing ====
- World Championships in Perth, Australia:
  - Women's match racing:
    - Petite final: Ekaterina Skudina, Elena Siuzeva, Elena Oblova (RUS) 1–3 (bronze) Claire Leroy, Élodie Bertrand, Marie Riou (FRA)
    - Final: (silver) Lucy MacGregor, Annie Lush, Kate McGregor (GBR) 0–4 (gold) Anna Tunnicliffe, Deborah Capozzi, Molly Vandemoer (USA)

==== Snowboarding ====
- World Cup in Telluride, United States:
  - Snowboard cross men: (gold) Pierre Vaultier (FRA) (silver) Christopher Robanske (CAN) (bronze) Nick Baumgartner (USA)
  - Snowboard cross women: (gold) Lindsey Jacobellis (USA) (silver) Dominique Maltais (CAN) (bronze) Déborah Anthonioz (FRA)

=== December 15, 2011 (Thursday) ===
==== Basketball ====
- Euroleague Regular Season Matchday 9 (teams in **bold** advance to the Top 16):
  - Group A:
    - Fenerbahçe Ülker (Turkey) 70–80 (Spain) Gescrap Bizkaia
    - **Olympiacos** (Greece) 86–61 (Italy) **Bennet Cantù**
      - Standings: (Spain) Caja Laboral, Bennet Cantù, Fenerbahçe Ülker, Olympiacos 5–4, Gescrap Bizkaia 4–5, (France) SLUC Nancy 3–6.
  - Group B: Brose Baskets (Germany) 68–82 (Lithuania) Žalgiris Kaunas
    - Standings: (Russia) **CSKA Moscow** 9–0, (Greece) **Panathinaikos** 6–3, (Spain) **Unicaja** 4–5, Žalgiris Kaunas, Brose Baskets 3–6, (Croatia) KK Zagreb 2–7.
  - Group C: **Maccabi Tel Aviv** (Israel) 96–57 (Turkey) **Anadolu Efes**
    - Standings: (Spain) **Real Madrid** 7–2, Maccabi Tel Aviv 6–3, Anadolu Efes 5–4, (Serbia) Partizan Mt:s Belgrade 4–5, (Italy) EA7 Emporio Armani 3–6, (Belgium) Spirou Charleroi 2–7.
  - Group D:
    - **UNICS Kazan** (Russia) 68–41 (Poland) Asseco Prokom Gdynia
    - **Montepaschi Siena** (Italy) 77–74 (Spain) **FC Barcelona Regal**
      - Standings: FC Barcelona Regal 8–1, Montepaschi Siena 7–2, UNICS Kazan 6–3, (Turkey) **Galatasaray Medical Park** 4–5, Asseco Prokom Gdynia, (Slovenia) Union Olimpija Ljubljana 1–8.
- FIBA Africa Clubs Champions Cup in Salé, Morocco:
  - Group A: ASB Mazembe (Democratic Republic of the Congo) 75–62 (Libya) Al Ahly
    - Standings (after 3 games): (Morocco) AS Salé 6 points, (Angola) C.R.D. Libolo, (Nigeria) Union Bank 5, ASB Mazembe, Al Ahly 4, (Burundi) Urunani 3.
  - Group B:
    - Royal Hoopers (Nigeria) 57–73 (Tunisia) Étoile Sportive du Sahel
    - C.R. Al Hoceima (Morocco) 66–60 (Nigeria) Royal Hoopers
      - Standings (after 3 games): (Angola) Primeiro de Agosto 6 points, C.R. Al Hoceima, Étoile Sportive du Sahel 5, (Angola) Petro Atlético, (Equatorial Guinea) Malabo Kings 4, Royal Hoopers 2.

==== Biathlon ====
- World Cup 3 in Hochfilzen, Austria:
  - 10 km sprint men: (gold) Tarjei Bø (NOR) 23:57.2 (1+0) (silver) Martin Fourcade (FRA) 24:01.2 (1+1) (bronze) Timofey Lapshin (RUS) 24:14.4 (0+0)
    - Sprint standings (after 3 of 10 races): (1) Bø 152 points (2) Carl Johan Bergman (SWE) 120 (3) Fourcade 116
    - Overall standings (after 6 of 26 races): (1) Bø 265 points (2) Fourcade 253 (3) Bergman & Emil Hegle Svendsen (NOR) 225

==== Cricket ====
- Sri Lanka in South Africa:
  - 1st Test in Centurion, day 1: Sri Lanka 180 (47.4 overs; Vernon Philander 5/53); South Africa 90/1 (34 overs). South Africa trail by 90 runs with 9 wickets remaining in the 1st innings.

==== Darts ====
- 2012 World Championship in London, England:
  - Preliminary round: Paul Barham (ENG) 2–4 **Scott MacKenzie** (HKG)
  - First round:
    - Jamie Caven (ENG) 1–3 **Roland Scholten** (NLD)
    - Mark Webster (WAL) 2–3 **Richie Burnett** (WAL)
    - **Adrian Lewis** (ENG) 3–2 Nigel Heydon (ENG)
    - **Wayne Jones** (ENG) 3–1 MacKenzie

==== Football (soccer) ====
- FIFA Club World Cup in Yokohama, Japan:
  - Semi-finals: Al-Sadd (Qatar) 0–4 (Spain) **Barcelona**
- UEFA Europa League group stage Matchday 6 (teams in **bold** advance to the round of 32):
  - Group A:
    - **PAOK** (Greece) 1–1 (Russia) **Rubin Kazan**
    - Shamrock Rovers (Republic of Ireland) 0–4 (England) Tottenham Hotspur
      - Final standings: PAOK 12 points, Rubin Kazan 11, Tottenham Hotspur 10, Shamrock Rovers 0.
  - Group B:
    - **Hannover 96** (Germany) 3–1 (Ukraine) Vorskla Poltava
    - Copenhagen (Denmark) 0–1 (Belgium) **Standard Liège**
      - Final standings: Standard Liège 14 points, Hannover 96 11, Copenhagen 5, Vorskla Poltava 2.
  - Group C:
    - Hapoel Tel Aviv (Israel) 2–0 (Poland) **Legia Warsaw**
    - **PSV Eindhoven** (Netherlands) 2–1 (Romania) Rapid București
      - Final standings: PSV Eindhoven 16 points, Legia Warsaw 9, Hapoel Tel Aviv 7, Rapid București 3.
  - Group G:
    - **AZ** (Netherlands) 1–1 (Ukraine) **Metalist Kharkiv**
    - Austria Wien 2–0 (Sweden) Malmö FF
      - Final standings: Metalist Kharkiv 14 points, Arizona, Austria Wien 8, Malmö FF 1.
  - Group H:
    - **Club Brugge** (Belgium) 1–1 (Portugal) **Braga**
    - Birmingham City (England) 1–0 (Slovenia) Maribor
      - Final standings: Club Brugge, Braga 11 points, Birmingham City 10, Maribor 1.
  - Group I:
    - **Udinese** (Italy) 1–1 (Scotland) Celtic
    - **Atlético Madrid** (Spain) 3–1 (France) Rennes
      - Final standings: Atlético Madrid 13 points, Udinese 9, Celtic 6, Rennes 3.

==== Rugby union ====
- Amlin Challenge Cup pool stage Matchday 4:
  - Pool 1: Stade Français (France) 45–3 (Italy) Crociati Parma
    - Standings: Stade Français 19 points (4 matches), (England) Worcester Warriors 10 (3), (Romania) București Wolves 5 (3), Crociati Parma 0 (4).
  - Pool 3:
    - Bordeaux Bègles (France) 15–10 (Italy) Rovigo
    - London Wasps (England) 25–11 (France) Bayonne
      - Standings (after 4 matches): London Wasps 14 points, Bayonne 13, Bordeaux Bègles 9, Rovigo 1.
  - Pool 5: Brive (France) 38–13 (Spain) La Vila
    - Standings: Brive 18 points (4 matches), (England) Sale Sharks 10 (3), (France) Agen 5 (3), La Vila 0 (4).

==== Snooker ====
- For the first time in professional snooker, two maximum breaks are compiled on the same day, at the FFB Open. Matthew Stevens (WAL) compiles the 82nd and Ding Junhui (CHN) the 83rd; Ding also becomes the fifth person to compile more than two official maximum breaks.

==== Snowboarding ====
- World Cup in Telluride, United States:
  - Giant slalom men: (gold) Benjamin Karl (AUT) (silver) Andreas Prommegger (AUT) (bronze) Simon Schoch (SUI)
    - Giant slalom standings (after 2 of 11 events) & Overall standings: (1) Karl 1450 points (2) Prommegger 1400 (3) Aaron March (ITA) 1250
  - Giant slalom women: (gold) Julia Dujmovits (AUT) (silver) Fränzi Mägert-Kohli (SUI) (bronze) Amelie Kober (GER)
    - Giant slalom standings (after 2 of 11 events) & Overall standings: (1) Mägert-Kohli 1800 points (2) Dujmovits 1360 (3) Yekaterina Tudegesheva (RUS) 1090

=== December 14, 2011 (Wednesday) ===
==== Basketball ====
- Euroleague Regular Season Matchday 9 (teams in **bold** advance to the Top 16):
  - Group A: Caja Laboral (Spain) 90–55 (France) SLUC Nancy
    - Standings: (Turkey) Fenerbahçe Ülker, (Italy) **Bennet Cantù** 5–3, Caja Laboral 5–4, (Greece) Olympiacos 4–4, (Spain) Gescrap Bizkaia 3–5, SLUC Nancy 3–6.
  - Group B:
    - **CSKA Moscow** (Russia) 91–75 (Greece) **Panathinaikos**
    - KK Zagreb (Croatia) 67–82 (Spain) **Unicaja**
      - Standings: CSKA Moscow 9–0, Panathinaikos 6–3, Unicaja 4–5, (Germany) Brose Baskets 3–5, (Lithuania) Žalgiris Kaunas 2–6, KK Zagreb 2–7.
  - Group C:
    - EA7 Emporio Armani (Italy) 88–53 (Belgium) Spirou Charleroi
    - **Real Madrid** (Spain) 101–83 (Serbia) Partizan Mt:s Belgrade
      - Standings: Real Madrid 7–2, (Turkey) **Anadolu Efes**, (Israel) **Maccabi Tel Aviv** 5–3, Partizan Mt:s Belgrade 4–5, EA7 Emporio Armani 3–6, Spirou Charleroi 2–7.
  - Group D: **Galatasaray Medical Park** (Turkey) 80–59 (Slovenia) Union Olimpija Ljubljana
    - Standings: (Spain) **FC Barcelona Regal** 8–0, (Italy) **Montepaschi Siena** 6–2, (Russia) **UNICS Kazan** 5–3, Galatasaray Medical Park 4–5, (Poland) Asseco Prokom Gdynia 1–7, Union Olimpija Ljubljana 1–8.
- FIBA Africa Clubs Champions Cup in Salé, Morocco:
  - Group A:
    - Urunani (Burundi) 44–84 (Nigeria) Union Bank
    - C.R.D. Libolo (Angola) 64–62 (Democratic Republic of the Congo) ASB Mazembe
    - AS Salé (Morocco) 87–83 (Libya) Al Ahly
      - Standings: AS Salé 6 points (3 games), C.R.D. Libolo, Union Bank 5 (3), Al Ahly 3 (2), Urunani 3 (3), ASB Mazembe 2 (2).
  - Group B:
    - Malabo Kings (Equatorial Guinea) 20–0 (Nigeria) Royal Hoopers
    - Petro Atlético (Angola) 74–59 (Morocco) C.R. Al Hoceima
    - Primeiro de Agosto (Angola) 79–62 (Tunisia) Étoile Sportive du Sahel
      - Standings: Primeiro de Agosto 6 points (3 games), Petro Atlético, Malabo Kings 4 (3), C.R. Al Hoceima, Étoile Sportive du Sahel 3 (2), Royal Hoopers 0 (1).

==== Football (soccer) ====
- FIFA Club World Cup in Toyota, Japan:
  - Match for fifth place: Espérance (Tunisia) 2–3 (Mexico) **Monterrey**
  - Semi-finals: Kashiwa Reysol (Japan) 1–3 (Brazil) **Santos**
- Copa Sudamericana Finals second leg (first leg score in parentheses): **Universidad de Chile** 3–0 (1–0) (Ecuador) LDU Quito. Universidad de Chile win 6–0 on points.
  - Universidad become the first Chilean team to win the Copa Sudamericana.
- UEFA Europa League group stage Matchday 6 (teams in **bold** advance to the round of 32):
  - Group D:
    - Zürich (Switzerland) 2–0 (Romania) Vaslui
    - **Lazio** (Italy) 2–0 (Portugal) **Sporting CP**
      - Final standings: Sporting CP 12 points, Lazio 9, Vaslui 6, Zürich 3.
  - Group E:
    - Dynamo Kyiv (Ukraine) 3–3 (Israel) Maccabi Tel Aviv
    - **Beşiktaş** (Turkey) 3–1 (England) **Stoke City**
      - Final standings: Beşiktaş 12 points, Stoke City 11, Dynamo Kyiv 7, Maccabi Tel Aviv 2.
  - Group F:
    - Slovan Bratislava (Slovakia) 2–3 (Austria) **Red Bull Salzburg**
    - Paris Saint-Germain (France) 4–2 **(Spain) Athletic Bilbao**
      - Final standings: Athletic Bilbao 13 points, Red Bull Salzburg, Paris Saint-Germain 10, Slovan Bratislava 1.
  - Group J:
    - Maccabi Haifa (Israel) 0–3 (Germany) **Schalke 04**
    - **Steaua București** (Romania) 3–1 (Cyprus) AEK Larnaca
      - Final standings: Schalke 04 14 points, Steaua București 8, Maccabi Haifa 6, AEK Larnaca 5.
  - Group K:
    - **Wisła Kraków** (Poland) 2–1 (Netherlands) **Twente**
    - Fulham (England) 2–2 (Denmark) Odense
      - Final standings: Twente 13 points, Wisła Kraków 9, Fulham 8, Odense 4.
  - Group L:
    - Sturm Graz (Austria) 1–3 (Greece) AEK Athens
    - **Anderlecht** (Belgium) 5–3 (Russia) **Lokomotiv Moscow**
      - Final standings: Anderlecht 18 points, Lokomotiv Moscow 12, AEK Athens, Sturm Graz 3.
- (Peru) Torneo Descentralizado Play-offs, third leg: **Juan Aurich** 0–0 Alianza Lima. 2–2 on aggregate, Juan Aurich win 3–1 on penalties.
  - Juan Aurich win the title for the first time.

==== Handball ====
- World Women's Championship in São Paulo, Brazil, Quarterfinals:
  - Russia 23–25 **France**
  - Angola 23–28 **Denmark**
  - Croatia 25–30 **Norway**
  - **Spain** 27–26 Brazil

=== December 13, 2011 (Tuesday) ===
==== Basketball ====
- FIBA Africa Clubs Champions Cup in Salé, Morocco:
  - Group A:
    - Urunani (Burundi) 51–70 (Libya) Al Ahly
    - GDR Libolo (Angola) 75–78 (Morocco) AS Salé
    - Union Bank (Nigeria) 68–49 (Democratic Republic of the Congo) ASB Mazembe
  - Group B:
    - Malabo Kings (Equatorial Guinea) 51–101 (Angola) Primeiro de Agosto
    - Petro Atlético (Angola) 76–86 (Tunisia) Étoile Sportive du Sahel

=== December 12, 2011 (Monday) ===
==== Basketball ====
- FIBA Africa Clubs Champions Cup in Salé, Morocco:
  - Group A:
    - Union Bank (Nigeria) 80–85 (Angola) C.R.D. Libolo
    - AS Salé (Morocco) 110–43 (Burundi) Urunani
  - Group B:
    - C.R. Al Hoceima (Morocco) 116–46 (Equatorial Guinea) Malabo Kings
    - Primeiro de Agosto (Angola) 90–69 (Angola) Petro Atlético

==== Cricket ====
- Pakistan in Bangladesh:
  - 1st Test in Chittagong, day 4: Bangladesh 135 & 275 (82.3 overs); Pakistan 594/5d. **Pakistan win by an innings & 184 runs; lead 2-match series 1–0.**
- New Zealand in Australia:
  - 2nd Test in Hobart, day 4: New Zealand 150 & 226; Australia 136 & 233 (63.4 overs; David Warner 123*, Doug Bracewell 6/40). **New Zealand win by 7 runs; 2-match series drawn 1–1.**
    - Australia retain the Trans-Tasman Trophy.

==== Handball ====
- World Women's Championship in Brazil, Last 16:
  - Sweden 23–26 **France**
  - Romania 27–28 **Croatia**
  - **Denmark** 23–22 (a.e.t.) Japan
  - **Brazil** 35–22 Ivory Coast

=== December 11, 2011 (Sunday) ===
==== Athletics ====
- European Cross Country Championships in Velenje, Slovenia:
  - Men: (gold) Atelaw Yeshetela (BEL) 29:15 (silver) Ayad Lamdassem (ESP) 29:20 (bronze) José Rocha (POR) 29:21
  - Women: (gold) Fionnuala Britton (IRL) 25:55 (silver) Ana Dulce Félix (POR) 26:02 (bronze) Gemma Steel (GBR) 26:04

==== Biathlon ====
- World Cup 2 in Hochfilzen, Austria:
  - 4×7.5 km Relay Men: (gold) Norway (Rune Brattsveen, Lars Berger, Emil Hegle Svendsen, Tarjei Bø) 1:14:52.9 (1+7) (silver) Russia (Anton Shipulin, Andrei Makoveev, Evgeny Ustyugov, Dmitry Malyshko) 1:15:06.8 (0+5) (bronze) France (Vincent Jay, Simon Fourcade, Alexis Bœuf, Martin Fourcade) 1:15:23.9 (0+6)
  - 4×6 km Relay Women: (gold) Norway (Fanny Welle-Strand Horn, Elise Ringen, Synnøve Solemdal, Tora Berger) 1:07:13.3 (0+10) (silver) France (Marie-Laure Brunet, Anaïs Bescond, Sophie Boilley, Marie Dorin Habert) 1:07:26.9 (0+3) (bronze) Russia (Svetlana Sleptsova, Natalia Guseva, Anna Bogaliy-Titovets, Olga Zaitseva) 1:07:42.7 (0+6)

==== Bobsleigh ====
- World Cup in La Plagne, France (GER unless stated):
  - Four-man: (gold) Manuel Machata/Florian Becke/Andreas Bredau/Christian Poser 1:57.00 (58.48, 58.52) (silver) Maximilian Arndt/Rene Tiefert/Jan Speer/Martin Putze 1:57.24 (58.58, 58.66) (bronze) Thomas Florschütz/Gino Gerhardi/Kevin Kuske/Thomas Blaschek 1:57.26 (58.66, 58.60)
    - Standings (after 2 of 8 races): (1) Alexandr Zubkov (RUS) 409 points (2) Machata 401 (3) Florschütz 400

==== Cricket ====
- Pakistan in Bangladesh:
  - 1st Test in Chittagong, day 3: Bangladesh 135 & 134/4 (39 overs); Pakistan 594/5d (176.5 overs; Younis Khan 200*, Asad Shafiq 104). Bangladesh trail by 325 runs with 6 wickets remaining.
- New Zealand in Australia:
  - 2nd Test in Hobart, day 3: New Zealand 150 & 226 (78.3 overs); Australia 136 & 72/0 (19 overs). Australia require another 169 runs with 10 wickets remaining.
- West Indies in India:
  - 5th ODI in Chennai: India 267/6 (50 overs; Manoj Tiwary 104 r/h); West Indies 233 (44.1 overs; Kieron Pollard 119). **India win by 34 runs; win 5-match series 4–1.**

==== Cross-country skiing ====
- World Cup in Davos, Switzerland:
  - Men's Sprint Freestyle: (gold) Alexei Petukhov (RUS) 2:41.7 (silver) Teodor Peterson (SWE) 2:42.0 (bronze) Emil Jönsson (SWE) 2:42.1
    - Sprint standings (after 3 of 13 races): (1) Petukhov 208 points (2) Peterson 175 (3) Ola Vigen Hattestad (NOR) 111
    - Overall standings (after 8 of 37 races): (1) Petter Northug (NOR) 500 points (2) Dario Cologna (SUI) 322 (3) Johan Olsson (SWE) 259
  - Women's Sprint Freestyle: (gold) Kikkan Randall (USA) 3:02.4 (silver) Natalya Matveyeva (RUS) 3:04.1 (bronze) Maiken Caspersen Falla (NOR) 3:04.1
    - Sprint standings (after 3 of 13 races): (1) Randall 240 points (2) Matveyeva 194 (3) Hanna Brodin (SWE) 121
    - Overall standings (after 8 of 37 races): (1) Marit Bjørgen (NOR) 582 points (2) Vibeke Skofterud (NOR) 411 (3) Randall 393

==== Equestrianism ====
- Show jumping – World Cup:
  - Western European League, 6th competition in Geneva, Switzerland: (gold) Álvaro de Miranda Neto (BRA) on Ashleigh Drossel Dan (silver) Rolf-Göran Bengtsson (SWE) on Casall (bronze) Patrice Delaveau (FRA) on Orient Express
    - Standings (after 6 of 12 competitions): (1) Bengtsson 59 points (2) Steve Guerdat (SUI) 51 (3) Nick Skelton (GBR) 48
  - Central European League – North Sub-League, 11th competition in Poznań, Poland: (gold) Jörne Sprehe (GER) on Contifax (silver) Camila Mazza de Benedicto (BRA) on Willink (bronze) Henk van de Pol (NED) on Chesterfield
  - Pacific League – Australia, 13th competition in Sydney: (gold) Billy Raymont (AUS) on Ocean Beach NZPH (silver) Thomas McDermott (AUS) on Limerick (bronze) Catherine Green (AUS) on Da Vinci's Pride

==== Field hockey ====
- Men's Champions Trophy in Auckland, New Zealand:
  - Seventh place match: **Pakistan** 5–4 (a.e.t.) South Korea
  - Fifth place match: **Germany** 1–0 Great Britain
  - Third place match: New Zealand 3–5 (bronze) **Netherlands**
  - Final: (gold) **Australia** 1–0 (silver) Spain
    - Australia win the Trophy for the fourth successive time and 12th time overall.

==== Figure skating ====
- ISU Grand Prix:
  - Grand Prix Final and Junior Grand Prix Final in Quebec City, Canada:
    - Ice dancing: (gold) Meryl Davis / Charlie White (USA) 188.55 points (silver) Tessa Virtue / Scott Moir (CAN) 183.34 (bronze) Nathalie Péchalat / Fabian Bourzat (FRA) 169.69
      - Davis and White win the title for the third successive time.

==== Football (soccer) ====
- FIFA Club World Cup in Japan:
  - Quarter-finals in Toyota:
    - Espérance (Tunisia) 1–2 (Qatar) **Al-Sadd**
    - **Kashiwa Reysol** (Japan) 1–1 (4–3 pen.) (Mexico) Monterrey
- (Mexico) Primera División de México Apertura Liguilla Final Second leg (first leg score in parentheses): **Tigres UANL** 3–1 (1–0) Santos Laguna. Tigres UANL win 4–1 on aggregate.
  - Tigres UANL win the title for the third time.
- (Ecuador) Campeonato Ecuatoriano de Fútbol Serie A Finals, first leg: Emelec 0–1 Deportivo Quito

==== Golf ====
- European Tour:
  - Dubai World Championship in Dubai, United Arab Emirates:
    - Winner: Álvaro Quirós (ESP) 269 (−19)
      - Quirós wins his sixth European Tour title.
    - Final Race to Dubai standings (prize money in €): (1) Luke Donald (ENG) 5,323,400 (2) Rory McIlroy (NIR) 4,002,168 (3) Martin Kaymer (GER) 3,489,033
      - Donald becomes the first player to finish top of the money list on the PGA and European Tours in the same season.

==== Handball ====
- World Women's Championship in Brazil, Last 16:
  - South Korea 29–30 **Angola**
  - **Russia** 30–19 Iceland
  - **Norway** 34–22 Netherlands
  - Montenegro 19–23 **Spain**

==== Nine-ball pool ====
- Mosconi Cup in Las Vegas, United States:
  - **Team Europe** 11–7 (United States) Team USA
    - Nick van den Berg (NLD) 2–6 Shane Van Boening (USA)
    - Darren Appleton (ENG) 3–6 Johnny Archer (USA)
    - Niels Feijen (NLD) 6–4 Rodney Morris (USA)
      - Europe win the title for the second consecutive time and sixth time overall.

==== Nordic combined ====
- World Cup in Ramsau, Austria:
  - HS 98 / 10 km: (gold) Jason Lamy-Chappuis (FRA) 22:07.4 (silver) Magnus Krog (NOR) 22:07.8 (bronze) Mario Stecher (AUT) 22:08.0
    - Standings (after 6 of 23 races): (1) Lamy-Chappuis 354 points (2) Tino Edelmann (GER) 350 (3) Krog 275

==== Rugby union ====
- Heineken Cup pool stage Matchday 3:
  - Pool 3:
    - Glasgow Warriors (Scotland) 20–15 (France) Montpellier
    - Bath (England) 13–18 (Ireland) Leinster
      - Standings (after 3 matches): Leinster 11 points, Glasgow Warriors 8, Bath 6, Montpellier 4.
  - Pool 4: Clermont (France) 30–12 (England) Leicester Tigers
    - Standings (after 3 matches): Clermont 10 points, (Ireland) Ulster 9, Leicester Tigers 8, (Italy) Aironi 0.
- Amlin Challenge Cup pool stage Matchday 3:
  - Pool 1: București Wolves (Romania) 13–24 (England) Worcester Warriors
    - Standings (after 3 matches): (France) Stade Français 14 points, Worcester Warriors 10, București Wolves 5, (Italy) Crociati Parma 0.
  - Pool 4: Exeter Chiefs (England) 18–6 (Wales) Newport Gwent Dragons
    - Standings (after 3 matches): Exeter Chiefs 10 points, (France) Perpignan, Newport Gwent Dragons 9, (Italy) Cavalieri Prato 0.

==== Sailing ====
- World Championships in Perth, Australia:
  - Men's 470: (gold) Mathew Belcher / Malcolm Page (AUS) 28 points (silver) Luke Patience / Stuart Bithell (GBR) 40 (bronze) Sime Fantela / Igor Marenic (CRO) 62
  - Men's Finn: (gold) Giles Scott (GBR) 30 points (silver) Pieter-Jan Postma (NED) 31 (bronze) Edward Martin Wright (GBR) 45
  - Women's Laser Radial: (gold) Marit Boumeester (NED) 49 points (silver) Evi Van Acker (BEL) 53 (bronze) Paige Railey (USA) 71
  - Women's RS:X: (gold) Lee Korzits (ISR) 31 points (silver) Zofia Noceti-Klepacka (POL) 33 (bronze) Marina Alabau (ESP) 45
    - Korzits wins the title for the second time and becomes the first Israeli in any sport to win multiple world championships.

==== Short track speed skating ====
- World Cup 4 in Shanghai, China:
  - 500m men: (gold) Charles Hamelin (CAN) 40.905 (silver) Jon Eley (GBR) 41.054 (bronze) Liang Wenhao (CHN) 41.178
    - Standings (after 6 of 8 races): (1) Olivier Jean (CAN) 3000 points (2) Liang 2804 (3) Eley 2719
  - 1000m men: (gold) Kwak Yoon-Gy (KOR) 1:25.300 (silver) Jean 1:25.451 (bronze) Noh Jin-Kyu (KOR) 1:25.971
    - Standings (after 5 of 8 races): (1) Kwak 4312 points (2) Noh 2096 (3) Hamelin 2000
  - 5000m relay men: (gold) China (Liang, Song Weilong, Yu Yongjun, Wu Dajing) 6:38.567 (silver) Canada (Hamelin, Michael Gilday, Jean, Rémi Beaulieu-Tinker) 6:48.858 (bronze) Great Britain (Jack Whelbourne, Eley, Paul Stanley, Richard Shoebridge) 7:02.363
    - Standings (after 4 of 6 races): (1) Korea 2664 points (2) Canada 2650 (3) China 2538
  - 500m women: (gold) Arianna Fontana (ITA) 44.026 (silver) Liu Qiuhong (CHN) 44.111 (bronze) Fan Kexin (CHN) 44.320
    - Standings (after 6 of 8 races): (1) Martina Valcepina (ITA) 3470 points (2) Liu 3294 (3) Fontana 3000
  - 1000m women: (gold) Katherine Reutter (USA) 1:32.721 (silver) Li Jianrou (CHN) 1:32.864 (bronze) Yui Sakai (JPN) 1:32.882
    - Standings (after 5 of 8 races): (1) Sakai 3050 points (2) Elise Christie (GBR) 2230 (3) Li 1962
  - 3000m relay Women: (gold) China (Liu, Li, Xiao Han, Fan) 4:12.394 (silver) United States (Lana Gehring, Alyson Dudek, Reutter, Jessica Smith) 4:13.000 (bronze) Japan (Ayuko Ito, Sayuri Shimizu, Sakai, Marie Yoshida) 4:13.763
    - Standings (after 4 of 6 races): (1) China 3640 points (2) Japan 2408 (3) Korea 1948

==== Ski jumping ====
- Men's World Cup in Harrachov, Czech Republic:
  - HS 142: (gold) Richard Freitag (GER) 292.4 points (silver) Thomas Morgenstern (AUT) 283.9 (bronze) Severin Freund (GER) 277.8
    - Standings (after 5 of 27 events): (1) Andreas Kofler (AUT) 358 points (2) Gregor Schlierenzauer (AUT) 302 (3) Freitag 294

==== Snooker ====
- UK Championship Final in York, England: **Judd Trump** (ENG) 10–8 Mark Allen (NIR)
  - Trump wins his second ranking title, and the seventh professional title of his career.

==== Swimming ====
- European Short Course Championships in Szczecin, Poland:
  - 200m freestyle men: (gold) Paul Biedermann (GER) 1:42.92 (silver) Filippo Magnini (ITA) 1:43.20 (bronze) László Cseh (HUN) 1:43.71
  - 100m backstroke men: (gold) Radosław Kawecki (POL) 50.43 (silver) Aschwin Wildeboer (ESP) 50.61 (bronze) Pavel Sankovich (BLR) 51.14
  - 200m breaststroke men: (gold) Dániel Gyurta (HUN) 2:02.37 (silver) Vyacheslav Sinkevich (RUS) 2:03.61 (bronze) Michael Jamieson (GBR) 2:03.77
  - 50m butterfly men: (gold) Andriy Govorov (UKR) 22.70 (silver) Amaury Leveaux (FRA) 22.74 (bronze) Konrad Czerniak (POL) 22.77
  - 100m individual medley men: (gold) Peter Mankoč (SLO) 52.70 (silver) Markus Deibler (GER) 53.04 (bronze) Martti Aljand (EST) 53.37
  - 4 × 50 m freestyle relay men: (gold) Italy (Luca Dotto, Marco Orsi, Federico Bocchia, Andrea Rolla) 1:24.82 (silver) Russia (Sergey Fesikov, Yevgeny Lagunov, Andrey Grechin, Nikita Konovalov) 1:25.11 (bronze) Belgium (François Heersbrandt, Emmanuel Vanluchene, Louis Croenen, Jasper Aerents) 1:25.83
  - 50m freestyle women: (gold) Britta Steffen (GER) 24.01 (silver) Jeanette Ottesen (DEN) 24.11 (bronze) Triin Aljand (EST) 24.23
  - 200m freestyle women: (gold) Silke Lippok (GER) 1:54.08 (silver) Melanie Costa Schmid (ESP) 1:54.31 (bronze) Evelyn Verrasztó (HUN) 1:54.55
  - 200m backstroke women: (gold) Daryna Zevina (UKR) 2:02.25 (CR) (silver) Duane Da Rocha Marcé (ESP) 2:03.32 (bronze) Melanie Nocher (IRL) 2:04.29
  - 100m breaststroke women: (gold) Valentina Artemyeva (RUS) 1:05.19 (silver) Rikke Møller Pedersen (DEN) 1:05.23 (bronze) Daria Deeva (RUS) 1:05.83
  - 100m butterfly women: (gold) Ottesen 56.22 (silver) Jemma Lowe (GBR) 56.67 (bronze) Ilaria Bianchi (ITA) 57.42
  - 400m individual medley women: (gold) Mireia Belmonte García (ESP) 4:24.55 (CR) (silver) Hannah Miley (GBR) 4:26.06 (bronze) Zsuzsanna Jakabos (HUN) 4:27.86

=== December 10, 2011 (Saturday) ===
==== Biathlon ====
- World Cup 2 in Hochfilzen, Austria:
  - 12.5 km Pursuit Men: (gold) Emil Hegle Svendsen (NOR) 33:09.0 (1+0+1+0) (silver) Tarjei Bø (NOR) 33:09.1 (0+0+1+0) (bronze) Benjamin Weger (SUI) 33:13.9 (1+0+0+0)
    - Pursuit standings (after 2 of 8 races): (1) Svendsen 114 points (2) Bø 97 (3) Weger 84
    - Overall standings (after 5 of 26 races): (1) Carl Johan Bergman (SWE) & Svendsen 225 points (3) Bø 205
  - 10 km Pursuit Women: (gold) Darya Domracheva (BLR) 29:34.4 (1+0+1+0) (silver) Olga Zaitseva (RUS) 29:34.7 (0+0+0+1) (bronze) Magdalena Neuner (GER) 29:37.5 (0+0+0+2)
    - Pursuit standings (after 2 of 8 races): (1) Neuner 96 points (2) Tora Berger (NOR) 92 (3) Domracheva 85
    - Overall standings (after 5 of 26 races): (1) Neuner 264 points (2) Kaisa Mäkäräinen (FIN) 229 (3) Domracheva 225

==== Bobsleigh ====
- World Cup in La Plagne, France:
  - Two-man: (gold) Thomas Florschütz/Kevin Kuske (GER) 1:58.50 (59.39, 59.11) (silver) Steven Holcomb/Steven Langton (USA) 1:58.85 (59.48, 59.37) (bronze) Beat Hefti/Thomas Lamparter (SUI) 1:58.91 (59.53, 59.38)
    - Standings (after 2 of 8 races): (1) Florschütz 435 points (2) Hefti 425 (3) Holcomb 410

==== Cricket ====
- Pakistan in Bangladesh:
  - 1st Test in Chittagong, day 2: Bangladesh 135; Pakistan 415/4 (128 overs; Mohammad Hafeez 143). Pakistan lead by 280 runs with 6 wickets remaining in the 1st innings.
- New Zealand in Australia:
  - 2nd Test in Hobart, day 2: New Zealand 150 & 139/3 (44 overs); Australia 136 (51 overs). New Zealand lead by 153 runs with 7 wickets remaining.

==== Cross-country skiing ====
- World Cup in Davos, Switzerland (NOR unless stated):
  - Men's 30 km Freestyle Individual: (gold) Petter Northug 1:07:43.8 (silver) Maurice Manificat (FRA) 1:08:35.2 (bronze) Lukáš Bauer (CZE) 1:08:43.3
    - Distance standings (after 4 of 21 races): (1) Northug 240 points (2) Johan Olsson (SWE) 169 (3) Manificat 151
    - Overall standings (after 7 of 37 races): (1) Northug 455 points (2) Dario Cologna (SUI) 286 (3) Olsson 259
  - Women's 15 km Freestyle Individual: (gold) Marit Bjørgen 35:59.5 (silver) Vibeke Skofterud 36:41.3 (bronze) Therese Johaug 36:41.7
    - Distance standings (after 4 of 21 races): (1) Bjørgen 296 points (2) Skofterud 226 (3) Johaug 186
    - Overall standings (after 7 of 37 races): (1) Bjørgen 546 points (2) Skofterud 389 (3) Johaug 376

==== Curling ====
- European Championships in Moscow, Russia:
  - Men:
    - World Challenge Game 2: **France** 10–6 Russia
      - France win the challenge 2–0 and qualify for the World Championship.
    - Gold Medal Game: (silver) Sweden 6–7 (gold) **Norway**
      - Norway win the title for the second successive time and fifth time overall.
  - Women:
    - World Challenge Game 2: **Czech Republic** 7–4 Hungary
      - Czech Republic win the challenge 2–0 and qualify for the World Championship.
    - Gold Medal Game: (silver) Sweden 2–8 (gold) **Scotland**
      - Scotland win the title for the second time.

==== Field hockey ====
- Men's Champions Trophy in Auckland, New Zealand:
  - Pool C (teams in **bold** advance to the final):
    - Netherlands 1–3 **Spain**
    - **Australia** 2–1 New Zealand
      - Final standings: Australia 9 points, Spain 6, New Zealand, Netherlands 1.
  - Pool D:
    - Germany 5–0 Pakistan
    - Great Britain 4–3 South Korea
      - Final standings: Germany 7 points, Great Britain 6, Pakistan 3, Korea 1.

==== Figure skating ====
- ISU Grand Prix:
  - Grand Prix Final and Junior Grand Prix Final in Quebec City, Canada:
    - Ladies: (gold) Carolina Kostner (ITA) 187.48 points (silver) Akiko Suzuki (JPN) 179.76 (bronze) Alena Leonova (RUS) 176.42
    - Men: (gold) Patrick Chan (CAN) 260.30 points (silver) Daisuke Takahashi (JPN) 249.12 (bronze) Javier Fernández (ESP) 247.55
    - Pairs: (gold) Aliona Savchenko/Robin Szolkowy (GER) 212.26 points (silver) Tatiana Volosozhar/Maxim Trankov (RUS) 212.08 (bronze) Yuko Kavaguti/Alexander Smirnov (RUS) 187.77
    - Junior ice dancing (all RUS): (gold) Victoria Sinitsina / Ruslan Zhiganshin 147.53 points (silver) Anna Yanovskaia / Sergey Mozgov 136.61 (bronze) Alexandra Stepanova / Ivan Bukin 135.17
    - Junior men: (gold) Jason Brown (USA) 208.41 points (silver) Yan Han (CHN) 205.93 (bronze) Joshua Farris (USA) 203.98

==== Football (soccer) ====
- CAF U-23 Championship in Marrakech, Morocco:
  - Third Place Play-off: Senegal 0–2 (bronze) **Egypt**
  - Final: (gold) **Gabon** 2–1 (silver) Morocco
    - Gabon win the title for the first time.
    - Gabon, Morocco and Egypt qualify for 2012 Olympics, Senegal advances to AFC-CAF playoffs.
- CECAFA Cup in Dar es Salaam, Tanzania:
  - Third place play-off: (bronze) **Sudan** 1–0 Tanzania
  - Final: (silver) Rwanda 2–2 (2–3 pen.) (gold) **Uganda**
    - Uganda win the Cup for the 12th time.
- OFC Champions League group stage Matchday 3:
  - Group B: Hekari United (Papua New Guinea) 3–1 (Solomon Islands) Koloale
    - Standings: (New Zealand) Auckland City 6 points (2 matches), (Vanuatu) Amicale 4 (2), Hekari United 4 (3), Koloale 0 (3).

==== Freestyle skiing ====
- World Cup in Rukatunturi, Finland (USA unless stated):
  - Moguls men: (gold) Mikaël Kingsbury (CAN) 25.00 points (silver) Sho Kashima 21.71 (bronze) Anthony Benna (FRA) 16.28
    - Overall standings: (1) Kingsbury & Wing Tai Barrymore 20 points (3) Kashima & Torin Yater-Wallace 16
  - Muguls women: (gold) Hannah Kearney 24.70 points (silver) Eliza Outtrim 22.25 (bronze) Nikola Sudová (CZE) 21.70
    - Overall standings: (1) Kearney & Brita Sigourney 20 points (3) Outtrim & Rosalind Groenewoud (CAN) 16

==== Luge ====
- World Cup 2 in Whistler, Canada:
  - Women: (gold) Natalie Geisenberger (GER) 1:23.439 (41.748, 41.691) (silver) Tatjana Hüfner (GER) 1:23.482 (41.700, 41.782) (bronze) Tatiana Ivanova (RUS) 1:23.606 (41.796, 41.810)
    - Standings (after 2 of 9 races): (1) Hüfner 185 points (2) Geisenberger 160 (3) Anke Wischnewski (GER) 140
  - Team relay: (gold) Germany (Geisenberger, Felix Loch, Ronny Pietrasik/Christian Weise) 2:18.773 (45.026, 46.717, 47.030) (silver) Canada (Alex Gough, Samuel Edney, Tristan Walker/Justin Snith 2:19.001 (45.073, 46.681, 47.247) (bronze) Russia (Ivanova, Albert Demtschenko, Vladislav Yuzhakov/Vladimir Makhnutin) 2:19.162 (45.130, 46.822, 47.210)
    - Standings (after 2 of 6 races): (1) Canada & Germany 185 points (3) Russia 140

==== Mixed martial arts ====
- UFC 140 in Toronto, Ontario, Canada:
  - Featherweight bout: **Jung Chan-Sung** (KOR) def. Mark Hominick (CAN) via KO (punches)
  - Welterweight bout: **Brian Ebersole** (USA) def. Claude Patrick (CAN) via split decision (29–28, 28–29, 29–28)
  - Light Heavyweight bout: **Antônio Rogério Nogueira** (BRA) def. Tito Ortiz (USA) via TKO (strikes to the body)
  - Heavyweight bout: **Frank Mir** (USA) def. Antônio Rodrigo Nogueira (BRA) via submission (kimura)
  - Light Heavyweight Championship bout: **Jon Jones** (USA) (c) def. Lyoto Machida (BRA) via technical submission (guillotine choke)

==== Nine-ball pool ====
- Mosconi Cup in Las Vegas, United States:
  - Team Europe 10–5 (United States) Team USA
    - Darren Appleton (ENG)/Niels Feijen (NLD) 6–3 Shawn Putnam (USA)/Mike Dechaine (USA)
    - Appleton 6–2 Putnam
    - Ralf Souquet (GER)/Feijen 6–2 Johnny Archer (USA)/Rodney Morris (USA)
    - Nick van den Berg (NLD) 5–6 Shane Van Boening (USA)
    - Chris Melling (ENG) 6–2 Dechaine

==== Nordic combined ====
- World Cup in Ramsau, Austria:
  - HS 98 / 10 km: (gold) Jan Schmid (NOR) 22:05.8 (silver) Jason Lamy-Chappuis (FRA) 22:08.2 (bronze) Tino Edelmann (GER) 22:08.8
    - Standings (after 5 of 23 races): (1) Edelmann 300 points (2) Lamy-Chappuis 254 (3) Håvard Klemetsen (NOR) 239

==== Rugby union ====
- IRB Sevens World Series:
  - South Africa Sevens in Port Elizabeth:
    - Shield: **Zimbabwe** 19–12 Kenya
    - Bowl: Canada 19–22 **Scotland**
    - Plate: **Wales** 48–0 Fiji
    - Cup: South Africa 26–31 **New Zealand**
      - Standings (after 3 of 9 competitions): (1) Fiji & New Zealand 51 points (3) South Africa 48
- Heineken Cup pool stage Matchday 3:
  - Pool 1:
    - Scarlets (Wales) 14–17 (Ireland) Munster
    - Castres (France) 41–22 (England) Northampton Saints
      - Standings (after 3 matches): Munster 12 points, Scarlets 10, Castres 6, Northampton Saints 3.
  - Pool 2: Racing Métro (France) 14–34 (England) London Irish
    - Standings (after 3 matches): (Wales) Cardiff Blues 12 points, (Scotland) Edinburgh 9, London Irish 7, Racing Métro 3.
  - Pool 5:
    - Benetton Treviso (Italy) 30–26 (France) Biarritz
    - Saracens (England) 31–26 (Wales) Ospreys
      - Standings (after 3 matches): Saracens 10 points, Ospreys, Biarritz 7, Benetton Treviso 6.
  - Pool 6: Connacht (Ireland) 10–14 (England) Gloucester
    - Standings (after 3 matches): (France) Toulouse 12 points, (England) Harlequins 8, Gloucester 5, Connacht 1.
- Amlin Challenge Cup pool stage Matchday 3:
  - Pool 1: Crociati Parma (Italy) 0–57 (France) Stade Français
    - Standings: Stade Français 14 points (3 matches), (England) Worcester Warriors, (Romania) București Wolves 5 (2), Crociati Parma 0 (3).
  - Pool 2: Lyon (France) 31–16 (Italy) Petrarca Padova
    - Standings (after 3 matches): (England) Newcastle Falcons 13 points, (France) Toulon 10, Lyon 5, Petrarca Padova 0.
  - Pool 3:
    - Rovigo (Italy) 7–31 (France) Bordeaux Bègles
    - Bayonne (France) 19–11 (England) London Wasps
      - Standings (after 3 matches): Bayonne 13 points, London Wasps 10, Bordeaux Bègles 5, Rovigo 0.
  - Pool 5: La Vila (Spain) 18–47 (France) Brive
    - Standings (after 3 matches): Brive 13 points, (England) Sale Sharks 10, (France) Agen 5, La Vila 0.

==== Short track speed skating ====
- World Cup 4 in Shanghai, China (CHN unless stated):
  - 500m men: (gold) Olivier Jean (CAN) 41.073 (silver) Gong Qiuwen 41.516 (bronze) Daan Breeuwsma (NED) 41.667
    - Standings (after 5 of 8 races): (1) Jean 3000 points (2) Liang Wenhao 2164 (3) Jon Eley (GBR) 1919
  - 1500m men: (gold) Noh Jin-Kyu (KOR) 2:09.041 (WR) (silver) Charles Hamelin (CAN) 2:09.098 (bronze) Kwak Yoon-Gy (KOR) 2:09.548
    - Standings (after 5 of 8 races): (1) Noh 4000 points (2) Kwak 2240 (3) Hamelin 1826
  - 500m women: (gold) Fan Kexin 43.873 (silver) Liu Qiuhong 43.959 (bronze) Jessica Smith (USA) 45.338
    - Standings (after 5 of 8 races): (1) Martina Valcepina (ITA) 3302 points (2) Liu 2494 (3) Fan 2050
  - 1500m women: (gold) Cho Ha-Ri (KOR) 2:22.473 (silver) Katherine Reutter (USA) 2:22.764 (bronze) Xiao Han 2:23.061
    - Standings (after 5 of 8 races): (1) Cho 2952 points (2) Reutter 2800 (3) Lee Eun-Byul (KOR) 2537

==== Skeleton ====
- World Cup in La Plagne, France:
  - Women: (gold) Mellisa Hollingsworth (CAN) 2:06.09 (1:03.00, 1:03.09) (silver) Anne O'Shea (USA) 2:06.46 (1:03.27, 1:03.19) (bronze) Katie Uhlaender (USA) 2:06.64 (1:03.43, 1:03.21)
    - Standings (after 2 of 8 races): (1) Hollingsworth 425 points (2) Olga Potylitsina (RUS) 393 (3) Anja Huber (GER) 384

==== Ski jumping ====
- Men's World Cup in Harrachov, Czech Republic:
  - HS 142 Team: (gold) Norway (Tom Hilde, Bjørn Einar Romøren, Vegard Sklett, Anders Bardal) 993.7 points (silver) Austria (Thomas Morgenstern, David Zauner, Andreas Kofler, Gregor Schlierenzauer) 956.0 (bronze) Slovenia (Jernej Damjan, Jure Šinkovec, Peter Prevc, Robert Kranjec) 888.6

==== Snooker ====
- UK Championship in York, England, Semi-finals: Ricky Walden (ENG) 7–9 **Mark Allen** (NIR)

==== Surfing ====
- Men's World Tour:
  - Billabong Pipeline Masters in Pipeline, Hawaii, United States: (1) Kieren Perrow (AUS) (2) Joel Parkinson (AUS) (3) Michel Bourez (PYF) & Kelly Slater (USA)
    - Final Standings: (1) Slater 67,100 points (2) Parkinson 56,100 (3) Owen Wright (AUS) 47,900

==== Swimming ====
- European Short Course Championships in Szczecin, Poland:
  - 100m freestyle men: (gold) Sergey Fesikov (RUS) 46.56 (silver) Luca Dotto (ITA) 46.89 (bronze) Krisztián Takács (HUN) 47.46
  - 1500m freestyle men: (gold) Mateusz Sawrymowicz (POL) 14:29.81 (silver) Mads Glæsner (DEN) 14:29.88 (bronze) Sergiy Frolov (UKR) 14:35.22
  - 50m breaststroke men: (gold) Fabio Scozzoli (ITA) 26.25 (silver) Damir Dugonjič (SLO) 26.34 (bronze) Alexander Dale Oen (NOR) 26.49
  - 200m butterfly men: (gold) László Cseh (HUN) 1:50.87 (silver) Nikolay Skvortsov (RUS) 1:51.21 (bronze) Joe Roebuck (GBR) 1:51.62
  - 400m freestyle women: (gold) Mireia Belmonte García (ESP) 3:56.39 (silver) Lotte Friis (DEN) 3:58.02 (bronze) Melanie Costa Schmid (ESP) 4:00.30
  - 50m backstroke women: (gold) Anastasia Zuyeva (RUS) 26.23 (silver) Georgia Davies (GBR) 26.93 (bronze) Simona Baumrtová (CZE) 26.94
  - 100m individual medley women: (gold) Theresa Michalak (GER) 59.05 (silver) Zsuzsanna Jakabos (HUN) 59.72 (bronze) Mie Østergaard Nielsen (DEN) 1:00.10
  - 4 × 50 m medley relay women: (gold) Denmark (Nielsen, Rikke Møller Pedersen, Jeanette Ottesen, Pernille Blume) 1:46.48 (silver) Russia (Zuyeva, Valentina Artemyeva, Irina Bespalova, Margarita Nesterova) 1:47.08 (bronze) Poland (Aleksandra Urbańczyk, Ewa Ścieszko, Anna Dowgiert, Katarzyna Wilk) 1:48.70

=== December 9, 2011 (Friday) ===
==== Biathlon ====
- World Cup 2 in Hochfilzen, Austria:
  - 10 km Sprint Men (all 0+0): (gold) Carl Johan Bergman (SWE) 24:41.9 (silver) Andrei Makoveev (RUS) 24:51.1 (bronze) Benjamin Weger (SUI) 25:01.5
    - Sprint standings (after 2 of 10 races): (1) Bergman 120 points (2) Tarjei Bø (NOR) 92 (3) Emil Hegle Svendsen (NOR) 91
    - Overall standings (after 4 of 26 races): (1) Martin Fourcade (FRA) & Bergman 182 points (3) Svendsen 165
  - 7.5 km Sprint Women: (gold) Magdalena Neuner (GER) 21:09.2 (0+0) (silver) Kaisa Mäkäräinen (FIN) 21:24.1 (1+0) (bronze) Olga Zaitseva (RUS) 21:31.9 (1+0)
    - Sprint standings (after 2 of 10 races): (1) Neuner 120 points (2) Mäkäräinen 102 (3) Darya Domracheva (BLR) 80
    - Overall standings (after 4 of 26 races): (1) Neuner 216 points (2) Mäkäräinen 199 (3) Domracheva 165

==== Bobsleigh ====
- World Cup in La Plagne, France:
  - Two-woman: (gold) Kaillie Humphries/Emily Baadsvik (CAN) 2:02.81 (1:01.63, 1:01.18) (silver) Cathleen Martini/Janine Tischer (GER) 2:02.93 (1:01.79, 1:01.14) (bronze) Fabienne Meyer/Hanne Schenk (SUI) 2:02.98 (1:01.75, 1:01.23)
    - Standings (after 2 of 8 races): (1) Anja Schneiderheinze-Stöckel (GER) 417 points (2) Martini & Sandra Kiriasis (GER) 394

==== Cricket ====
- Pakistan in Bangladesh:
  - 1st Test in Chittagong, day 1: Bangladesh 135 (51.2 overs); Pakistan 132/0 (38 overs). Pakistan trail by 3 runs with 10 wickets remaining in the 1st innings.
- New Zealand in Australia:
  - 2nd Test in Hobart, day 1: New Zealand 150 (45.5 overs; James Pattinson 5/51); Australia 12/1 (4.2 overs). Australia trail by 138 runs with 9 wickets remaining in the 1st innings.

==== Curling ====
- European Championships in Moscow, Russia:
  - Men:
    - Semifinal: **Norway** 5–2 Czech Republic
    - World Challenge Game 1: **France** 10–4 Russia
    - Bronze Medal Game: Czech Republic 6–9 (bronze) **Denmark**
  - Women:
    - Semifinal: Denmark 2–10 **Scotland**
    - World Challenge Game 1: **Czech Republic** 7–4 Hungary
    - Bronze Medal Game: Denmark 7–13 (bronze) **Russia**

==== Figure skating ====
- ISU Grand Prix:
  - Grand Prix Final and Junior Grand Prix Final in Quebec City, Canada:
    - Junior pairs: (gold) Sui Wenjing / Han Cong (CHN) 160.43 points (silver) Katherine Bobak / Ian Beharry (CAN) 152.65 (bronze) Britney Simpson / Matthew Blackmer (USA) 146.35
      - Sui and Han win the title for the second time.
    - Junior ladies (all RUS): (gold) Yulia Lipnitskaya 179.73 points (silver) Polina Shelepen 162.34 (bronze) Polina Korobeynikova 151.18
      - Lipnitskaia wins the title for the first time.

==== Freestyle skiing ====
- World Cup in Copper Mountain, United States (USA unless stated):
  - Halfpipe men: (gold) Wing Tai Barrymore 87.2 points (silver) Torin Yater-Wallace 84.6 (bronze) Duncan Adams 83.8
  - Halfpipe women: (gold) Brita Sigourney 86.6 points (silver) Rosalind Groenewoud (CAN) 81.4 (bronze) Virginie Faivre (SUI) 77.4

==== Handball ====
- World Women's Championship in Brazil (teams in **bold** advance to the Round of 16):
  - Group A in Santos:
    - **Angola** 25–22 Germany
    - **Norway** 28–27 **Montenegro**
    - China 15–23 **Iceland**
      - Final standings: Norway 8 points, Angola, Montenegro, Iceland 6, Germany 4, China 0.
  - Group B in Barueri:
    - **Spain** 39–9 Australia
    - **Netherlands** 26–38 **South Korea**
    - **Russia** 34–19 Kazakhstan
      - Final standings: Russia 10 points, Spain 8, South Korea 6, Netherlands 4, Kazakhstan 2, Australia 0.
  - Group C in São Paulo:
    - Cuba 24–32 **Japan**
    - **Romania** 20–39 **France**
    - **Brazil** 34–33 Tunisia
      - Final standings: Brazil 10 points, France 8, Romania, Japan 5, Tunisia 2, Cuba 0.
  - Group D in São Bernardo do Campo:
    - **Ivory Coast** 31–24 Uruguay
    - **Sweden** 19–20 **Denmark**
    - **Croatia** 23–18 Argentina
      - Final standings: Denmark 10 points, Croatia 8, Sweden 6, Côte d'Ivoire 4, Uruguay 2, Argentina 0.

==== Luge ====
- World Cup 2 in Whistler, Canada:
  - Men (all GER): (gold) Felix Loch 1:36.480 (48.263, 48.217) (silver) Johannes Ludwig 1:36.758 (48.406, 48.352) (bronze) David Möller 1:36.778 (48.361, 48.417)
    - Standings (after 2 of 9 races): (1) Loch 200 points (2) Möller 155 (3) Ludwig 145
  - Doubles: (gold) Andreas Linger/Wolfgang Linger (AUT) 1:22.644 (41.255, 41.389) (silver) Peter Penz/Georg Fischler (AUT) 1:22.888 (41.331, 41.557) (bronze) Christian Oberstolz/Patrick Gruber (ITA) 1:22.943 (41.380, 41.563)
    - Standings (after 2 of 9 races): (1) Penz/Fischler 185 points (2) Linger/Linger 170 (3) Vladislav YuzhakovVladimir Makhnutin (RUS) 127

==== Nine-ball pool ====
- Mosconi Cup in Las Vegas, United States:
  - Team Europe 6–4 (United States) Team USA
    - Nick van den Berg (NLD)/Niels Feijen (NLD) 5–6 Shane Van Boening (USA)/Johnny Archer (USA)
    - Ralf Souquet (GER) 1–6 Mike Dechaine (USA)
    - Darren Appleton (ENG)/Chris Melling (ENG) 5–6 Shawn Putnam (USA)/Rodney Morris (USA)
    - van den Berg 6–1 Archer
    - Souquet/Melling (ENG) 6–2 Van Boening/Morris

==== Rugby union ====
- Heineken Cup pool stage Matchday 3:
  - Pool 2: Cardiff Blues (Wales) 25–8 (Scotland) Edinburgh
    - Standings: Cardiff Blues 12 points (3 matches), Edinburgh 9 (3), (France) Racing Métro 3 (2), (England) London Irish 2 (2).
  - Pool 4: Ulster (Ireland) 31–10 (Italy) Aironi
    - Standings: Ulster 9 points (3 matches), (England) Leicester Tigers 8 (2), (France) Clermont 6 (2), Aironi 0 (3).
  - Pool 6: Harlequins (England) 10–21 (France) Toulouse
    - Standings: Toulouse 12 points (3 matches), Harlequins 8 (3), (England) Gloucester 1 (2), (Ireland) Connacht 0 (2).
- Amlin Challenge Cup pool stage Matchday 3:
  - Pool 4: Perpignan (France) 54–20 (Italy) Cavalieri Prato
    - Standings: Perpignan 9 points (3 matches), (Wales) Newport Gwent Dragons 9 (2), (England) Exeter Chiefs 6 (2), Cavalieri Prato 0 (3).

==== Skeleton ====
- World Cup in La Plagne, France:
  - Men: (gold) Martins Dukurs (LAT) 2:01.25 (1:00.51, 1:00.74) (silver) Tomass Dukurs (LAT) 2:02.23 (1:01.01, 1:01.22) (bronze) Aleksandr Tretyakov (RUS) 2:02.42 (1:01.09, 1:01.33)
    - Standings (after 2 of 8 races): (1) Martins Dukurs 450 points (2) Tomass Dukurs & Tretyakov 410

==== Ski jumping ====
- Men's World Cup in Harrachov, Czech Republic:
  - HS 142: (gold) Gregor Schlierenzauer (AUT) 246.8 points (silver) Daiki Ito (JPN) 245.8 (bronze) Anders Bardal (NOR) 245.0
    - Standings (after 4 of 27 events): (1) Andreas Kofler (AUT) 313 points (2) Schlierenzauer 270 (3) Richard Freitag (GER) 194

==== Snooker ====
- UK Championship in York, England, Semi-finals: **Judd Trump** (ENG) 9–7 Neil Robertson (AUS)

==== Swimming ====
- European Short Course Championships in Szczecin, Poland:
  - 50m backstroke men: (gold) Aschwin Wildeboer (ESP) 23.43 (silver) Flori Lang (SUI) 23.57 (bronze) Pavel Sankovich (BLR) 23.64
  - 100m breaststroke men: (gold) Alexander Dale Oen (NOR) 57.05 (silver) Damir Dugonjič (SLO) 57.29 (bronze) Fabio Scozzoli (ITA) 57.30
  - 100m butterfly men: (gold) Konrad Czerniak (POL) 49.62 (silver) Yevgeny Korotyshkin (RUS) 49.88 (bronze) François Heersbrandt (BEL) 50.44
  - 400m individual medley men: (gold) László Cseh (HUN) 4:01.68 (silver) Dávid Verrasztó (HUN) 4:03.03 (bronze) Gal Nevo (ISR) 4:04.49
  - 100m freestyle women: (gold) Britta Steffen (GER) 51.94 (silver) Jeanette Ottesen (DEN) 52.05 (bronze) Amy Smith (GBR) 52.77
  - 800m freestyle women: (gold) Lotte Friis (DEN) 8:07.53 (silver) Erika Villaécija García (ESP) 8:12.23 (bronze) Melanie Costa Schmid (ESP) 8:16.28
  - 100m backstroke women: (gold) Daryna Zevina (UKR) 56.96 (silver) Anastasia Zuyeva (RUS) 57.12 (bronze) Mie Østergaard Nielsen (DEN) 57.57
  - 200m breaststroke women: (gold) Rikke Møller Pedersen (DEN) 2:19.55 (silver) Anastasia Chaun (RUS) 2:20.84 (bronze) Fanny Lecluyse (BEL) 2:21.14
  - 50m butterfly women: (gold) Ottesen 24.92 (CR) (silver) Triin Aljand (EST) 25.51 (bronze) Sviatlana Khakhlova (BLR) 25.96
  - 4 × 50 m freestyle relay women: (gold) Germany (Steffen, Dorothea Brandt, Paulina Schmiedel, Daniela Schreiber) 1:37.29 (silver) Denmark (Nielsen, Pernille Blume, Katrine Holm Sørensen, Ottesen) 1:37.63 (bronze) Italy (Erika Ferraioli, Erica Buratto, Federica Pellegrini, Laura Letrari) 1:38.12

=== December 8, 2011 (Thursday) ===
==== Alpine skiing ====
- Men's World Cup in Beaver Creek, United States:
  - Slalom: (gold) Ivica Kostelić (CRO) 1:50.20 (54.64, 55.56) (silver) Cristian Deville (ITA) 1:50.34 (54.64, 55.70) (bronze) Marcel Hirscher (AUT) 1:50.68 (54.50, 56.18)
    - Overall standings (after 8 of 45 races): (1) Aksel Lund Svindal (NOR) 334 points (2) Ted Ligety (USA) 309 (3) Hirscher 280

==== Basketball ====
- Euroleague Regular Season Matchday 8 (teams in **bold** advance to Top 16):
  - Group A: Olympiacos (Greece) 84–82 (Spain) Caja Laboral
    - Standings: (Turkey) Fenerbahçe Ülker, (Italy) Bennet Cantù 5–3, Caja Laboral, Olympiacos 4–4, (Spain) Gescrap Bizkaia, (France) SLUC Nancy 3–5.
  - Group B: Unicaja (Spain) 79–90 (Germany) Brose Baskets
    - Standings: (Russia) **CSKA Moscow** 8–0, (Greece) **Panathinaikos** 6–2, Brose Baskets, Unicaja 3–5, (Lithuania) Žalgiris Kaunas, (Croatia) KK Zagreb 2–6.
  - Group C:
    - Spirou Basket (Belgium) 84–79 (Serbia) Partizan Mt:s Belgrade
    - **Real Madrid** (Spain) 88–64 (Israel) **Maccabi Tel Aviv**
      - Standings: Real Madrid 6–2, (Turkey) **Anadolu Efes**, Maccabi Tel Aviv 5–3, Partizan Mt:s Belgrade 4–4, (Italy) EA7 Emporio Armani, Spirou Basket 2–6.
  - Group D:
    - Galatasaray Medical Park (Turkey) 63–67 (Italy) **Montepaschi Siena**
    - **FC Barcelona Regal** (Spain) 63–50 (Russia) **UNICS Kazan**
      - Standings: FC Barcelona Regal 8–0, Montepaschi Siena 6–2, UNICS Kazan 5–3, Galatasaray Medical Park 3–5, (Slovenia) Union Olimpija Ljubljana, (Poland) Asseco Prokom Gdynia 1–7.

==== Cricket ====
- West Indies in India:
  - 4th ODI in Indore: India 418/5 (50 overs; Virender Sehwag 219); West Indies 265 (49.2 overs). **India win by 153 runs; lead 5-match series 3–1.**
    - Sehwag hits the highest individual score in a One Day International, surpassing 200* set by teammate Sachin Tendulkar in 2010.

==== Curling ====
- European Championships in Moscow, Russia:
  - Men:
    - Tiebreakers:
      - Round 1:
        - Switzerland 2–8 **Scotland**
        - Germany 4–7 **Czech Republic**
      - Round 2: Scotland 5–7 **Czech Republic**
    - Playoffs:
      - **Sweden** 5–4 Norway
      - Denmark 8–9 **Czech Republic**
  - Women:
    - Tiebreaker: **Russia** 6–5 Germany
    - Playoffs:
      - **Sweden** 12–6 Denmark
      - **Scotland** 9–6 Russia

==== Field hockey ====
- Men's Champions Trophy in Auckland, New Zealand:
  - Pool C (team in **bold** advances to the final):
    - Spain 3–2 New Zealand
    - Netherlands 2–4 **Australia**
      - Standings (after 2 matches): Australia 6 points, Spain 3, New Zealand, Netherlands 1.
  - Pool D:
    - Pakistan 6–2 South Korea
    - Great Britain 1–2 Germany
      - Standings (after 2 matches): Germany 4 points, Pakistan, Great Britain 3, Korea 1.

==== Football (soccer) ====
- FIFA Club World Cup in Japan:
  - Play-off for Quarter-finals in Toyota: **Kashiwa Reysol** (Japan) 2–0 (New Zealand) Auckland City
- Copa Sudamericana Finals first leg: LDU Quito (Ecuador) 0–1 Universidad de Chile
- (Mexico) Primera División de México Apertura Liguilla Final First leg: Santos Laguna 0–1 Tigres UANL

==== Handball ====
- World Women's Championship in Brazil (teams in **bold** advance to the Round of 16):
  - Group C in São Paulo:
    - Japan 32–31 Tunisia
    - **France** 38–18 Cuba
    - **Brazil** 33–28 **Romania**
      - Standings (after 4 matches): Brazil 8 points, France 6, Romania 5, Japan 3, Tunisia 2, Cuba 0.
  - Group D in São Bernardo do Campo:
    - **Croatia** 27–26 **Sweden**
    - **Denmark** 38–17 Ivory Coast
    - Uruguay 19–16 Argentina
      - Standings (after 4 matches): Denmark 8 points, Croatia, Sweden 6, Côte d'Ivoire, Uruguay 2, Argentina 0.

==== Nine-ball pool ====
- Mosconi Cup in Las Vegas, United States:
  - Team Europe 4–1 (United States) Team USA
    - Team Europe 6–4 Team USA
    - Chris Melling (ENG)/Nick van den Berg (NLD) 3–6 Johnny Archer (USA)/Shawn Putnam (USA)
    - Niels Feijen (NLD) 6–0 Rodney Morris (USA)
    - Darren Appleton (ENG)/Ralf Souquet (GER) 6–4 Shane Van Boening (USA)/Mike Dechaine (USA)
    - Melling 6–5 Van Boening

==== Rugby union ====
- Amlin Challenge Cup pool stage Matchday 3:
  - Pool 2: Newcastle Falcons (England) 6–3 (France) Toulon
    - Standings: Newcastle Falcons 13 points (3 matches), Toulon 10 (3), (France) Lyon 1 (2), (Italy) Petrarca Padova 0 (2).
  - Pool 5: Agen (France) 14–29 (England) Sale Sharks
    - Standings: Sale Sharks 10 points (3 matches), (France) Brive 8 (2), Agen 5 (3), (Spain) La Vila 0 (2).

==== Snooker ====
- UK Championship in York, England, quarter-finals:
  - Stephen Maguire (SCO) 3–6 **Judd Trump** (ENG)
  - Ding Junhui (CHN) 2–6 **Neil Robertson** (AUS)
  - **Ricky Walden** (ENG) 6–3 Shaun Murphy (ENG)
  - **Mark Allen** (NIR) 6–5 Marco Fu (HKG)

==== Swimming ====
- European Short Course Championships in Szczecin, Poland:
  - 50m freestyle men: (gold) Konrad Czerniak (POL) 20.88 (silver) Sergey Fesikov (RUS) 20.95 (bronze) Marco Orsi (ITA) 21.01
  - 400m freestyle men: (gold) Paul Biedermann (GER) 3:38.65 (silver) Mads Glæsner (DEN) 3:39.30 (bronze) Paweł Korzeniowski (POL) 3:40.54
  - 200m backstroke men: (gold) Radosław Kawęcki (POL) 1:49.15 (silver) Aschwin Wildeboer (ESP) 1:50.63 (bronze) Péter Bernek (HUN) 1:51.21
  - 200m individual medley men: (gold) László Cseh (HUN) 1:53.43 (silver) Markus Rogan (AUT) 1:53.63 (bronze) Gal Nevo (ISR) 1:54.87
  - 4 × 50 m medley men: (gold) Italy (Mirco Di Tora, Fabio Scozzoli, Paolo Facchinelli, Orsi) 1:33.18 (silver) Russia (Vitaly Borisov, Sergey Geybel, Yevgeny Korotyshkin, Fesikov) 1:33.86 (bronze) Germany (Christian Diener, Erik Steinhagen, Steffen Deibler, Stefan Herbst) 1:34.41
  - 50m breaststroke women: (gold) Valentina Artemyeva (RUS) 30.06 (silver) Dorothea Brandt (GER) 30.17 (bronze) Daria Deeva (RUS) 30.63
  - 200m butterfly women: (gold) Mireia Belmonte García (ESP) 2:03.37 (silver) Jemma Lowe (GBR) 2:04.04 (bronze) Jessica Dickons (GBR) 2:04.80
  - 200m individual medley women: (gold) Belmonte García 2:07.06 (silver) Evelyn Verrasztó (HUN) 2:08.28 (bronze) Hannah Miley (GBR) 2:08.34

=== December 7, 2011 (Wednesday) ===
==== Alpine skiing ====
- Women's World Cup in Beaver Creek, United States:
  - Super Giant slalom: (gold) Lindsey Vonn (USA) 1:10.68 (silver) Fabienne Suter (SUI) 1:11.05 (bronze) Anna Fenninger (AUT) 1:11.09
    - Super-G standings (after 2 of 7 races): (1) Vonn 200 points (2) Fenninger 140 (3) Suter 94
    - Overall standings (after 7 of 40 races): (1) Vonn 522 points (2) Viktoria Rebensburg (GER) 286 (3) Elisabeth Görgl (AUT) 269

==== Basketball ====
- Euroleague Regular Season Matchday 8 (teams in **bold** advance to Top 16):
  - Group A:
    - Gescrap Bizkaia (Spain) 64–67 (Italy) Bennet Cantù
    - SLUC Nancy (France) 53–73 (Turkey) Fenerbahçe Ülker
      - Standings: Fenerbahçe Ülker, Bennet Cantù 5–3, (Spain) Caja Laboral 4–3, (Greece) Olympiacos 3–4, Gescrap Bizkaia, SLUC Nancy 3–5.
  - Group B:
    - **CSKA Moscow** (Russia) 87–74 (Croatia) KK Zagreb
    - Žalgiris Kaunas (Lithuania) 59–94 (Greece) **Panathinaikos**
      - Standings: CSKA Moscow 8–0, Panathinaikos 6–2, (Spain) Unicaja 3–4, (Germany) Brose Baskets 2–5, Žalgiris Kaunas, KK Zagreb 2–6.
  - Group C: **Anadolu Efes** (Turkey) 84–70 (Italy) EA7 Emporio Armani
    - Standings: (Spain) **Real Madrid**, (Israel) **Maccabi Tel Aviv** 5–2, Anadolu Efes 5–3, (Serbia) Partizan Mt:s Belgrade 4–3, EA7 Emporio Armani 2–6, (Belgium) Spirou Charleroi 1–6.
  - Group D: Asseco Prokom Gdynia (Poland) 67–52 (Slovenia) Union Olimpija Ljubljana
    - Standings: (Spain) **FC Barcelona Regal** 7–0, (Italy) **Montepaschi Siena**, (Russia) **UNICS Kazan** 5–2, (Turkey) Galatasaray Medical Park 3–4, Union Olimpija Ljubljana, Asseco Prokom Gdynia 1–7.

==== Curling ====
- European Championships in Moscow, Russia (teams in **bold** advance to the playoffs; teams in italics advance to tiebreaker):
  - Men:
    - Draw 8:
      - Latvia 4–6 Germany
      - Czech Republic 6–4 **Sweden**
      - Norway 9–4 Italy
      - Scotland 7–9 France
      - **Denmark** 6–7 Switzerland
    - Draw 9:
      - Czech Republic 7–6 Italy
      - Germany 3–4 Switzerland
      - France 10–6 Latvia
      - **Denmark** 4–6 **Norway**
      - Scotland 9–3 **Sweden**
        - Final standings: Sweden, Norway, Denmark 6–3, Switzerland, Czech Republic, Germany, Scotland 5–4, France 4–5, Latvia 2–7, Italy 1–8.
  - Women:
    - Draw 8:
      - **Denmark** 6–5 Switzerland
      - Norway 5–9 Italy
      - **Sweden** 8–4 Russia
      - Czech Republic 3–5 Germany
      - Latvia 6–9 **Scotland**
    - Draw 9:
      - Norway 4–7 Russia
      - Switzerland 7–10 **Scotland**
      - Germany 4–6 **Denmark**
      - Latvia 2–14 **Sweden**
      - Czech Republic 8–4 Italy
        - Final standings: Sweden 9–0, Denmark 8–1, Scotland 7–2, Russia, Germany 5–4, Italy, Switzerland, Czech Republic 3–6, Latvia, Norway 1–8.

==== Football (soccer) ====
- CAF U-23 Championship in Marrakech, Morocco (winner qualifies for 2012 Olympics):
  - Semi-finals: Egypt 2–3 **Morocco**
- UEFA Champions League group stage, Matchday 6 (teams in **bold** qualify for Round of 16, teams in italics qualify for Europa League Round of 32):
  - Group A:
    - Manchester City (England) 2–0 (Germany) **Bayern Munich**
    - Villarreal (Spain) 0–2 (Italy) **Napoli**
      - Final standings: Bayern Munich 13 points, Napoli 11, Manchester City 10, Villarreal 0.
  - Group B:
    - Lille (France) 0–0 (Turkey) Trabzonspor
    - **Internazionale** (Italy) 1–2 (Russia) **CSKA Moscow**
      - Final standings: Internazionale 10 points, CSKA Moscow 8, Trabzonspor 7, Lille 6.
  - Group C:
    - **Basel** (Switzerland) 2–1 (England) Manchester United
    - **Benfica** (Portugal) 1–0 (Romania) Oțelul Galați
      - Final standings: Benfica 12 points, Basel 11, Manchester United 9, Oțelul Galați 0.
  - Group D:
    - Dinamo Zagreb (Croatia) 1–7 (France) **Lyon**
    - Ajax (Netherlands) 0–3 (Spain) **Real Madrid**
      - Final standings: Real Madrid 18 points, Lyon, Ajax 8, Dinamo Zagreb 0.

==== Handball ====
- World Women's Championship in Brazil (teams in **bold** advance to the Round of 16):
  - Group A in Santos:
    - **Montenegro** 42–15 China
    - Angola 20–26 **Norway**
    - Iceland 26–20 Germany
      - Standings (after 4 matches): Montenegro, Norway 6 points, Angola, Iceland, Germany 4, China 0.
  - Group B in Barueri:
    - **Netherlands** 26–35 **Russia**
    - Kazakhstan 18–27 **Spain**
    - Australia 11–45 **South Korea**
      - Standings (after 4 matches): Russia 8 points, Spain 6, Netherlands, South Korea 4, Kazakhstan 2, Australia 0.

==== Snooker ====
- UK Championship in York, England, last 16 (ENG unless stated):
  - Mark Williams (WAL) 3–6 **Ricky Walden**
  - Martin Gould 4–6 **Shaun Murphy**
  - Ali Carter 2–6 **Mark Allen** (NIR)
  - **Marco Fu** (HKG) 6–3 Mark Selby

=== December 6, 2011 (Tuesday) ===
==== Alpine skiing ====
- Men's World Cup in Beaver Creek, United States:
  - Giant slalom: (gold) Ted Ligety (USA) 2:40.01 (1:20.42, 1:19.59) (silver) Marcel Hirscher (AUT) 2:40.70 (1:20.39, 1:20.31) (bronze) Kjetil Jansrud (NOR) 2:40.79 (1:20.78, 1:20.01)
    - Giant slalom standings (after 3 of 9 races): (1) Ligety 280 points (2) Hirscher 220 (3) Alexis Pinturault (FRA) 159
    - Overall standings (after 7 of 45 races): (1) Aksel Lund Svindal (NOR) 334 points (2) Ligety 289 (3) Didier Cuche (SUI) 268

==== Cricket ====
- Pakistan in Bangladesh:
  - 3rd ODI in Chittagong: Pakistan 177 (46.1 overs); Bangladesh 119 (38 overs). **Pakistan win by 58 runs; win 3-match series 3–0.**

==== Curling ====
- European Championships in Moscow, Russia (teams in **bold** advance to the playoffs):
  - Men:
    - Draw 6:
      - Scotland 2–5 Denmark
      - France 2–5 Norway
      - Switzerland 7–8 Sweden
      - Czech Republic 7–4 Germany
      - Latvia 5–4 Italy
    - Draw 7:
      - Sweden 9–8 Norway
      - Latvia 4–8 Scotland
      - Denmark 8–6 Germany
      - Italy 9–4 Switzerland
      - France 7–2 Czech Republic
        - Standings (after 7 draws): Denmark, Sweden 6–1, Germany, Norway, Scotland 4–3, Czech Republic, Switzerland 3–4, France, Latvia 2–5, Italy 1–6.
  - Women:
    - Draw 7:
      - Italy 3–8 **Sweden**
      - Denmark 11–1 Czech Republic
      - Latvia 4–11 Switzerland
      - Russia 4–7 Scotland
      - Germany 8–4 Norway
        - Standings (after 7 draws): Sweden 7–0, Denmark 6–1, Scotland 5–2, Germany, Russia 4–3, Switzerland 3–4, Czech Republic, Italy 2–5, Latvia, Norway 1–6.

==== Field hockey ====
- Men's Champions Trophy in Auckland, New Zealand (teams in **bold** advance to the top four):
  - Pool A:
    - **Spain** 8–1 Great Britain
    - **Australia** 6–1 Pakistan
      - Final standings: Australia 9 points, Spain 6, Great Britain 3, Pakistan 0.
  - Pool B:
    - South Korea 3–3 Germany
    - **Netherlands** 3–3 **New Zealand**
      - Final standings: Netherlands 7 points, New Zealand, Germany 4, Korea 1.

==== Football (soccer) ====
- CAF U-23 Championship in Tangiers, Morocco (winner qualifies for 2012 Olympics):
  - Semi-finals: Senegal 0–1 (a.e.t.) **Gabon**
- UEFA Champions League group stage, Matchday 6 (teams in **bold** qualify for Round of 16, teams in italics qualify for Europa League Round of 32):
  - Group E:
    - **Chelsea** (England) 3–0 (Spain) Valencia
    - Genk (Belgium) 1–1 (Germany) **Bayer Leverkusen**
      - Final standings: Chelsea 11 points, Bayer Leverkusen 10, Valencia 8, Genk 3.
  - Group F:
    - Olympiacos (Greece) 3–1 (England) **Arsenal**
    - Borussia Dortmund (Germany) 2–3 (France) **Marseille**
      - Final standings: Arsenal 11 points, Marseille 10, Olympiacos 9, Borussia Dortmund 4.
  - Group G:
    - Porto (Portugal) 0–0 (Russia) **Zenit St. Petersburg**
    - **APOEL** (Cyprus) 0–2 (Ukraine) Shakhtar Donetsk
      - Final standings: APOEL, Zenit St. Petersburg 9 points, Porto 8, Shakhtar Donetsk 5.
  - Group H:
    - **Barcelona** (Spain) 4–0 (Belarus) BATE Borisov
    - Viktoria Plzeň (Czech Republic) 2–2 (Italy) **Milan**
      - Final standings: Barcelona 16 points, Milan 9, Viktoria Plzeň 5, BATE Borisov 2.

==== Handball ====
- World Women's Championship in Brazil (teams in **bold** advance to the Round of 16):
  - Group A in Santos:
    - Montenegro 28–26 Angola
    - Norway 27–14 Iceland
    - Germany 23–22 China
      - Standings (after 3 matches): Norway, Montenegro, Angola, Germany 4 points, Iceland 2, China 0.
  - Group B in Barueri:
    - Russia 45–8 Australia
    - Kazakhstan 20–32 Netherlands
    - South Korea 26–29 Spain
      - Standings (after 3 matches): Russia 6 points, Spain, Netherlands 4, South Korea, Kazakhstan 2, Australia 0.
  - Group C in São Paulo:
    - Tunisia 32–29 Cuba
    - **Romania** 28–28 Japan
    - France 22–26 **Brazil**
      - Standings (after 3 matches): Brazil 6 points, Romania 5, France 4, Tunisia 2, Japan 1, Cuba 0.
  - Group D in São Bernardo do Campo:
    - **Sweden** 31–14 Uruguay
    - Croatia 19–23 **Denmark**
    - Argentina 19–25 Ivory Coast
      - Standings (after 3 matches): Denmark, Sweden 6 points, Croatia 4, Côte d'Ivoire 2, Argentina, Uruguay 0.

==== Snooker ====
- UK Championship in York, England, last 16:
  - Ronnie O'Sullivan (ENG) 5–6 **Judd Trump** (ENG)
  - **Ding Junhui** (CHN) 6–5 Matthew Stevens (WAL)
  - John Higgins (SCO) 4–6 **Stephen Maguire** (SCO)
  - Graeme Dott (SCO) 3–6 **Neil Robertson** (AUS)

=== December 5, 2011 (Monday) ===
==== Cricket ====
- West Indies in India:
  - 3rd ODI in Ahmedabad: West Indies 260/5 (50 overs); India 244 (46.5 overs). **West Indies win by 16 runs; India lead 5-match series 2–1.**

==== Curling ====
- European Championships in Moscow, Russia:
  - Men:
    - Draw 4:
      - Italy 4–9 Sweden
      - Switzerland 7–6 Latvia
      - Germany 7–4 France
      - Norway 7–8 Scotland
      - Czech Republic 5–6 Denmark
    - Draw 5:
      - France 3–8 Switzerland
      - Denmark 8–3 Italy
      - Czech Republic 8–4 Scotland
      - Sweden 6–5 Latvia
      - Norway 10–3 Germany
        - Standings (after 5 draws): Denmark, Germany, Sweden 4–1, Norway, Scotland, Switzerland 3–2, Czech Republic 2–3, France, Latvia, 1–4, Italy 0–5.
  - Women:
    - Draw 5:
      - Germany 5–7 Scotland
      - Latvia 2–10 Russia
      - Norway 6–5 Czech Republic
      - Italy 7–13 Denmark
      - Sweden 5–4 Switzerland
    - Draw 6:
      - Czech Republic 10–1 Latvia
      - Germany 6–9 Sweden
      - Scotland 5–4 Italy
      - Norway 3–8 Switzerland
      - Denmark 8–7 Russia
        - Standings (after 6 draws): Sweden 6–0, Denmark 5–1, Russia, Scotland 4–2, Germany 3–3, Czech Republic, Italy, Switzerland 2–4, Latvia, Norway 1–5.

==== Field hockey ====
- Men's Champions Trophy in Auckland, New Zealand: (teams in **bold** advance to the top four)
  - Pool A:
    - Great Britain 1–4 **Australia**
    - Spain 4–2 Pakistan
      - Standings (after 2 matches): Australia 6 points, Spain, Great Britain 3, Pakistan 0.
  - Pool B:
    - Netherlands 3–2 Germany
    - New Zealand 1–6 South Korea
      - Standings (after 2 matches): Netherlands 6 points, New Zealand, Germany 3, Korea 0.

==== Handball ====
- World Women's Championship in Brazil:
  - Group C in São Paulo:
    - Cuba 27–33 Romania
    - Tunisia 17–25 France
    - Japan 23–32 Brazil
      - Standings (after 2 matches): France, Brazil, Romania 4 points, Tunisia, Cuba, Japan 0.
  - Group D in São Bernardo do Campo:
    - Ivory Coast 25–28 Sweden
    - Argentina 13–31 Denmark
    - Uruguay 15–45 Croatia
      - Standings (after 2 matches): Croatia, Denmark, Sweden 4 points, Côte d'Ivoire, Argentina, Uruguay 0.

==== Snooker ====
- UK Championship in York, England, last 32 (ENG unless stated):
  - **Judd Trump** 6–4 Dominic Dale (WAL)
  - **Mark Allen** (NIR) 6–3 Adrian Gunnell
  - Stephen Lee 3–6 **Ricky Walden**
  - **Mark Williams** (WAL) 6–4 Joe Jogia

=== December 4, 2011 (Sunday) ===
==== Alpine skiing ====
- Men's World Cup in Beaver Creek, United States:
  - Giant slalom: (gold) Marcel Hirscher (AUT) 2:38.45 (1:18.74, 1:19.71) (silver) Ted Ligety (USA) 2:38.61 (1:18.53, 1:20.08) (bronze) Fritz Dopfer (GER) 2:39.07 (1:19.12, 1:19.95)
    - Giant slalom standings (after 2 of 8 races): (1) Ligety 180 points (2) Hirscher 140 (3) Alexis Pinturault (FRA) 109
    - Overall standings (after 6 of 45 races): (1) Aksel Lund Svindal (NOR) 294 points (2) Didier Cuche (SUI) 260 (3) Beat Feuz (SUI) 246
- Women's World Cup in Lake Louise, Canada:
  - Super-G: (gold) Lindsey Vonn (USA) 1:20.21 (silver) Anna Fenninger (AUT) 1:20.40 (bronze) Julia Mancuso (USA) 1:20.92
    - Overall standings (after 6 of 40 races): (1) Vonn 422 points (2) Viktoria Rebensburg (GER) 286 (3) Elisabeth Görgl (AUT) 243

==== American football ====
- 2011 NCAA Division I FBS football season:
  - The 2012 Bowl Championship Series pairings are announced:
    - Rose Bowl, Jan. 2: (10) Wisconsin vs. (5) Oregon
    - Fiesta Bowl, Jan. 2: (3) Oklahoma State vs. (4) Stanford
    - Sugar Bowl, Jan. 3: (13) Michigan vs. (11) Virginia Tech
    - Orange Bowl, Jan. 4: (15) Clemson vs. (23) West Virginia
    - BCS National Championship Game, Jan. 9: (1) LSU vs. (2) Alabama

==== Auto racing ====
- V8 Supercars:
  - Sydney Telstra 500 in Sydney, New South Wales (AUS unless stated):
    - Race 28: (1) Mark Winterbottom (Ford Performance Racing; Ford FG Falcon) (2) Craig Lowndes (Triple Eight Race Engineering; Holden VE Commodore) (3) Shane van Gisbergen (NZL) (Stone Brothers Racing; Ford FG Falcon)
      - Final drivers' championship standings: (1) Jamie Whincup (Triple Eight Race Engineering; Holden VE Commodore) 3168 points (2) Lowndes 3133 (3) Winterbottom 2710
        - Whincup wins the title for the third time.

==== Biathlon ====
- World Cup 1 in Östersund, Sweden:
  - Men's 12.5 km Pursuit: (gold) Martin Fourcade (FRA) 32:56.0 (0+0+0+0) (silver) Emil Hegle Svendsen (NOR) 33:21.5 (0+0+1+1) (bronze) Jaroslav Soukup (CZE) 33:22.9 (0+1+0+0)
    - Overall standings (after 3 of 26 races): (1) Fourcade 163 points (2) Carl Johan Bergman (SWE) & Svendsen 122
  - Women's 10 km Pursuit: (gold) Tora Berger (NOR) 33:56.9 (0+0+0+1) (silver) Kaisa Mäkäräinen (FIN) 34:30.1 (0+1+0+1) (bronze) Magdalena Neuner (GER) 35:21.3 (0+1+2+1)
    - Overall standings (after 3 of 26 races): (1) Neuner 156 points (2) Mäkäräinen 145 (3) Berger 126

==== Bobsleigh ====
- World Cup in Igls, Austria:
  - Four-man: (gold) Russia (Alexandr Zubkov, Filipp Yegorov, Dmitry Trunenkov, Nikolay Hrenkov) 1:43.05 (51.56, 51.49) (silver) United States (Steven Holcomb, Justin Olsen, Steven Langton, Curtis Tomasevicz) 1:43.11 (51.65, 51.46) (bronze) Germany (Thomas Florschütz, Martin Rostig, Kevin Kuske, Thomas Blaschek) 1:43.41 (51.77, 51.64)

==== Cricket ====
- New Zealand in Australia:
  - 1st Test in Woolloongabba, Brisbane, day 4: New Zealand 295 & 150 (49.4 overs; James Pattinson 5/27); Australia 427 & 19/1 (2.2 overs). **Australia win by 9 wickets; lead 2-match series 1–0.**

==== Cross-country skiing ====
- World Cup in Düsseldorf, Germany:
  - Men's Team Sprint F: (gold) Jesper Modin/Teodor Peterson (SWE) 18:22.7 (silver) Nikita Kriukov/Alexei Petukhov (RUS) 18:22.9 (bronze) Pål Golberg/Ola Vigen Hattestad (NOR) 18:23.4
  - Women's Team Sprint F: (gold) Mari Eide/Maiken Caspersen Falla (NOR) 9:57.0 (silver) Sadie Bjornsen/Kikkan Randall (USA) 9:58.6 (bronze) Natalya Korostelyova/Natalya Matveyeva (RUS) 9:59.1

==== Curling ====
- European Championships in Moscow, Russia:
  - Men:
    - Draw 2:
      - Denmark 7–3 Latvia
      - Norway 6–3 Czech Republic
      - Scotland 6–5 Switzerland
      - Germany 7–4 Italy
      - Sweden 8–2 France
    - Draw 3:
      - Germany 10–6 Scotland
      - Italy 4–7 France
      - Sweden 8–3 Denmark
      - Latvia 8–11 Czech Republic
      - Switzerland 5–9 Norway
        - Standings (after 3 draws): Germany 3–0, Denmark, Norway, Scotland, Sweden 2–1, Czech Republic, France, Latvia, Switzerland 1–2, Italy 0–3.
  - Women:
    - Draw 3:
      - Switzerland 9–7 Czech Republic
      - Russia 8–3 Germany
      - Italy 11–4 Latvia
      - Denmark 11–2 Norway
      - Scotland 5–8 Sweden
    - Draw 4:
      - Latvia 5–6 Denmark
      - Sweden 8–2 Norway
      - Czech Republic 6–10 Scotland
      - Switzerland 5–11 Russia
      - Italy 6–7 Germany
        - Standings (after 4 draws): Sweden 4–0, Denmark, Germany, Russia 3–1, Italy, Scotland 2–2, Czech Republic, Latvia, Switzerland 1–3, Norway 0–4.

==== Field hockey ====
- Men's Champions Trophy in Auckland, New Zealand: All matches postponed due to an unplayable pitch.

==== Football (soccer) ====
- CAF Confederation Cup Final second leg (first leg score in parentheses): **Maghreb de Fès** (Morocco) 1–0 (0–1) (Tunisia) Club Africain. 1–1 on aggregate, Maghreb de Fès win 6–5 on penalties.
  - Magreb de Fès win the Cup for the first time.
- (Brazil) Campeonato Brasileiro Série A, final matchday:
  - Corinthians 0–0 Palmeiras
  - Vasco da Gama 1–1 Flamengo
    - Final standings: Corinthians 71 points, Vasco da Gama 69.
    - Corinthians win the title for the fifth time.
- (Argentina) Argentine Primera División Torneo Apertura, matchday 17:
  - Boca Juniors 3–0 Banfield
    - Standings (after 17 matches): Boca Juniors 39 points, Racing 28, Tigre 27 (16).
    - Boca Juniors win the title for the 24th time.
- (Uruguay) Uruguayan Primera División Torneo Apertura, final matchday:
  - Liverpool 0–1 Nacional
  - Danubio 4–1 Bella Vista
    - Final standings: Nacional 32 points, Danubio 31.
    - Nacional qualify for the championship playoff.

==== Golf ====
- European Tour:
  - UBS Hong Kong Open in Sheung Shui, Hong Kong:
    - Winner: Rory McIlroy (NIR) 268 (−12)
      - McIlroy wins his third European Tour title.
- Chevron World Challenge in Thousand Oaks, California, United States:
  - Winner: Tiger Woods (USA) 278 (−10)
    - Woods wins his first tournament in over two years.

==== Handball ====
- World Women's Championship in Brazil:
  - Group A in Santos:
    - Germany 24–25 Montenegro
    - China 16–43 Norway
    - Iceland 24–28 Angola
      - Standings (after 2 matches): Angola 4 points, Norway, Germany, Montenegro, Iceland 2, China 0.
  - Group B in Barueri:
    - South Korea 31–19 Kazakhstan
    - Spain 22–28 Russia
    - Australia 15–33 Netherlands
      - Standings (after 2 matches): Russia 4 points, Netherlands, Kazakhstan, Spain, South Korea 2, Australia 0.

==== Nordic combined ====
- World Cup in Lillehammer, Norway:
  - HS 138 / 10 km: (gold) Eric Frenzel (GER) 28:38.5 (silver) Jason Lamy-Chappuis (FRA) 28:55.9 (bronze) Björn Kircheisen (NOR) 28:59.1
    - Standings (after 4 of 23 races): (1) Tino Edelmann (GER) 240 points (2) Håvard Klemetsen (NOR) 189 (3) Alessandro Pittin (ITA) 180

==== Short track speed skating ====
- World Cup 3 in Nagoya, Japan (CHN unless stated):
  - Men's 500m: (gold) Olivier Jean (CAN) 41.491 (silver) Liang Wenhao 41.738 (bronze) Gong Qiuwen 42.815
    - Standings (after 4 of 8 races): (1) Jean 2000 points (2) Jon Eley (GBR) 1875 (3) Liang 1652
  - Men's 1000m (2): (gold) Charles Hamelin (CAN) 1:28.270 (silver) Kwak Yoon-Gy (KOR) 1:28.365 (bronze) Michael Gilday (CAN) 1:28.939
    - Standings (after 4 of 8 races): (1) Kwak 3312 points (2) Hamelin 2000 (3) Noh Jin-Kyu (KOR) 1456
  - Men's 5000m relay: (gold) China (Liang, Song Weilong, Wu Dajing, Yu Yongjun) 6:50.562 (silver) Russia (Semen Elistratov, Evgeny Kozulin, Viacheslav Kurginian, Vladimir Grigorev) 6:53.481 (bronze) Japan (Yuzo Takamido, Yuma Sakurai, Daisuke Uemura, Yoshiaki Oguro) 6:53.557
    - Standings (after 3 of 6 races): (1) South Korea 2152 points (2) Russia 2010 (3) Canada 1850
  - Women's 500m: (gold) Arianna Fontana (ITA) 44.479 (silver) Yui Sakai (JPN) 44.566 (bronze) Martina Valcepina (ITA) 44.667
    - Standings (after 4 of 8 races): (1) Valcepina 3040 points (2) Fontana & Marianne St-Gelais (CAN) 2000
  - Women's 1000m (2): (gold) Li Jianrou 1:32.708 (silver) Lin Meng 1:33.226 (bronze) Xiao Han 1:33.334
    - Standings (after 4 of 8 races): (1) Sakai 2410 points (2) Elise Christie (GBR) 2096 (3) Li 1162
  - Women's 3000m relay: (gold) Italy (Fontana, Cecilia Maffei, Arianna Valcepina, Martina Valcepina) 4:19.970 (silver) Japan (Ayuko Ito, Sayuri Shimizu, Sakai, Marie Yoshida) 4:20.041 (bronze) China (Liu Qiuhong, Fan Kexin, Lin, Xiao) 4:20.122
    - Standings (after 3 of 6 races): (1) China 2640 points (2) Japan 1768 (3) South Korea 1620

==== Ski jumping ====
- Men's World Cup in Lillehammer, Norway:
  - HS 138: (gold) Andreas Kofler (AUT) 252.0 points (silver) Severin Freund (GER) 249.2 (bronze) Anders Bardal (NOR) 249.2
    - Standings (after 3 of 27 events): (1) Kofler 300 points (2) Gregor Schlierenzauer (AUT) 170 (3) Richard Freitag (GER) 154

==== Snooker ====
- UK Championship in York, England, last 32 (ENG unless stated):
  - **Mark Selby** 6–0 Ryan Day (WAL)
  - Stuart Bingham 4–6 **Marco Fu** (HKG)
  - **Ronnie O'Sullivan** 6–1 Steve Davis
  - **Ali Carter** 6–4 Robert Milkins
  - **Martin Gould** 6–2 Peter Lines
  - **Shaun Murphy** 6–3 Li Yan (CHN)

==== Speed skating ====
- World Cup 3 in Heerenveen, Netherlands (NED unless stated):
  - Men's 1000 m: (gold) Kjeld Nuis 1:08.64, (silver) Sjoerd de Vries 1:09.14, (bronze) Mo Tae-bum (KOR) 1:09.18
    - Standings (after 3 of 6 races): (1) Nuis & Stefan Groothuis 260 points, (3) de Vries 180
  - Men's team pursuit: (gold) Netherlands (Sven Kramer, Wouter olde Heuvel, Jan Blokhuijsen) 3:42.35, (silver) Korea (Lee Seung-hoon, Joo Hyong-jun, Ko Byung-wook) 3:43.82, (bronze) Germany (Patrick Beckert, Marco Weber, Alexej Baumgärtner) 3:45.28
    - Standings (after 2 of 4 races): (1) Netherlands 200 points, (2) Korea & Germany 140
  - Women's 1000 m: (gold) Christine Nesbitt (CAN) 1:15.32, (silver) Yu Jing (CHN) 1:15.85, (bronze) Yekaterina Shikhova (RUS) 1:16.16
    - Standings (after 3 of 6 races): (1) Nesbitt 300 points, (2) Marrit Leenstra 180, (3) Margot Boer 166
  - Women's team pursuit: (gold) Canada (Brittany Schussler, Nesbitt, Cindy Klassen) 3:00.01, (silver) Russia (Yekaterina Lobysheva, Shikhova, Yuliya Skokova) 3:02.38, (bronze) Korea (Lee Ju-yeon, Noh Seon-yeong, Kim Bo-reum) 3:03.18
    - Standings (after 2 of 4 races): (1) Canada 200 points, (2) Russia 150, (3) Korea 130

==== Tennis ====
- Davis Cup Final, day 3: **Spain** 3–1 Argentina
  - Rafael Nadal (ESP) def. Juan Martín del Potro (ARG) 1–6, 6–4, 6–1, 7–6(0)
  - David Ferrer (ESP) vs. Juan Mónaco (ARG); not played
    - Spain win the Cup for the fifth time.

==== Volleyball ====
- FIVB Men's World Cup in Japan, Matchday 11 (teams in **bold** qualify for the 2012 Olympics):
  - **Poland** 2–3 **Russia**
  - Iran 1–3 Italy
  - Japan 0–3 **Brazil**
  - Cuba 3–1 Egypt
  - Argentina 3–0 China
  - Serbia 3–0 United States
    - Final standings: Russia 29 points, Poland 26, Brazil, Italy 24, Cuba 20, United States, Argentina 16, Serbia 15, Iran 12, Japan 8, China 5, Egypt 3.
      - Russia win the title for the sixth time.

=== December 3, 2011 (Saturday) ===
==== Alpine skiing ====
- Men's World Cup in Beaver Creek, United States:
  - Super-G: (gold) Sandro Viletta (SUI) 1:18.71 (silver) Aksel Lund Svindal (NOR) 1:18.91 (bronze) Beat Feuz (SUI) 1:18.97
    - Super-G standings (after 2 of 8 races): (1) Svindal 180 points (2) Didier Cuche (SUI) 109 (3) Viletta 108
    - Overall standings (after 5 of 45 races): (1) Svindal 265 points (2) Cuche 238 (3) Feuz 231
- Women's World Cup in Lake Louise, Canada:
  - Downhill: (gold) Lindsey Vonn (USA) 1:51.35 (silver) Marie Marchand-Arvier (FRA) 1:53.03 (bronze) Elisabeth Görgl (AUT) 1:53.26
    - Downhill standings (after 2 of 9 races): (1) Vonn 200 points (2) Tina Weirather (LIE) 106 (3) Dominique Gisin (SUI) 105
    - Overall standings (after 5 of 40 races): (1) Vonn 322 points (2) Viktoria Rebensburg (GER) 280 (3) Görgl 211

==== American football ====
- NCAA Football Bowl Subdivision Championship Games:
  - Conference USA in Houston: (24) Southern Miss 49, (7) Houston 28
  - SEC in Atlanta: (1) LSU 41, (12) Georgia 10
    - The Tigers advance to the BCS National Championship Game.
  - ACC in Charlotte, North Carolina: (21) Clemson 38, (5) Virginia Tech 10
    - Clemson will play in the Orange Bowl.
  - Big Ten in Indianapolis: (15) Wisconsin 42, (11) Michigan State 39
    - The Badgers will play Oregon in the Rose Bowl.
  - Bedlam Series: (3) Oklahoma State 44, (13) Oklahoma 10
    - Oklahoma State advances to the Fiesta Bowl or BCS National Championship Game.

==== Auto racing ====
- V8 Supercars:
  - Sydney Telstra 500 in Sydney, New South Wales (AUS unless stated):
    - Race 27: (1) Craig Lowndes (Triple Eight Race Engineering; Holden VE Commodore) (2) Garth Tander (Holden Racing Team; Holden VE Commodore) (3) Shane van Gisbergen (NZL) (Stone Brothers Racing; Ford FG Falcon)
      - Drivers' championship standings: (1) Jamie Whincup (Triple Eight Race Engineering; Holden VE Commodore) 3078 points (2) Lowndes 2995 (3) Mark Winterbottom (Ford Performance Racing; Ford FG Falcon) 2560

==== Biathlon ====
- World Cup 1 in Östersund, Sweden:
  - Women's 7.5 km Sprint: (gold) Magdalena Neuner (GER) 22:01.7 (0+1) (silver) Tora Berger (NOR) 22:01.9 (0+1) (bronze) Kaisa Mäkäräinen (FIN) 22:16.9 (2+0)
    - Overall standings (after 2 of 26 races): (1) Neuner 108 points (2) Darya Domracheva (BLR) 100 (3) Mäkäräinen 91

==== Bobsleigh ====
- World Cup in Igls, Austria:
  - Two-man: (gold) Beat Hefti/Thomas Lamparter (SUI) 1:44.24 (52.20, 52.04) (silver) Thomas Florschütz/Kevin Kuske (GER) 1:44.36 (52.33, 52.03) (bronze) Steven Holcomb/Justin Olsen (USA) 1:44.42 (52.26, 52.16)
  - Team: (gold) Germany I (Frank Rommel, Sandra Kiriasis/Stephanie Schneider, Anja Huber, Maximilian Arndt/Jan Speer) 3:35.03 (53.28, 53.84, 55.12, 52.79) (silver) Germany II (Alexander Kröckel, Anja Schneiderheinze-Stöckel/Christin Senkel, Marion Thees, Manuel Machata/Michail Makarow) 3:35.13 (53.40, 53.70, 55.32, 52.71) (bronze) Russia I (Aleksandr Tretyakov, Olga Fyodorova/Yulia Timofeeva, Olga Potylitsina, Alexander Kasjanov/Maxim Mokrousov) 3:35.29 (53.37, 54.10, 54.94, 52.88)

==== Cricket ====
- New Zealand in Australia:
  - 1st Test in Woolloongabba, Brisbane, day 3: New Zealand 295 & 10/1 (7 overs); Australia 427 (129.2 overs; Michael Clarke 139). New Zealand trail by 122 runs with 9 wickets remaining.
- Pakistan in Bangladesh:
  - 2nd ODI in Mirpur: Pakistan 262/7 (50 overs); Bangladesh 186/7 (50 overs; Nasir Hossain 100). **Pakistan win by 76 runs; lead 3-match series 2–0.**

==== Cross-country skiing ====
- World Cup in Düsseldorf, Germany (NOR unless stated):
  - Men's Sprint F: (gold) Ola Vigen Hattestad 2:57.5 (silver) Alexei Petukhov (RUS) 2:57.6 (bronze) Pål Golberg 2:57.6
    - Sprint standings (after 2 of 13 races): (1) Hattestad 111 points (2) Petukhov 108 (3) Teodor Peterson (SWE) 95
    - Overall standings (after 6 of 38 races): (1) Petter Northug 355 points (2) Dario Cologna (SUI) 278 (3) Johan Olsson (SWE) 259
  - Women's Sprint F: (gold) Kikkan Randall (USA) 1:44.7 (silver) Natalya Matveyeva (RUS) 1:45.1 (bronze) Laurien van der Graaf (SUI) 1:45.7
    - Sprint standings (after 2 of 13 races): (1) Randall 140 points (2) Matveyeva 114 (3) Hanna Brodin (SWE) 71
    - Overall standings (after 6 of 38 races): (1) Marit Bjørgen 446 points (2) Therese Johaug 316 (3) Vibeke Skofterud 309

==== Curling ====
- European Championships in Moscow, Russia:
  - Men, Draw 1:
    - Switzerland 7–3 Czech Republic
    - Sweden 5–7 Germany
    - Latvia 8–5 Norway
    - France 3–11 Denmark
    - Italy 4–6 Scotland
  - Women:
    - Draw 1:
      - Scotland 8–6 Norway
      - Italy 8–4 Switzerland
      - Denmark 6–9 Sweden
      - Germany 7–5 Latvia
      - Russia 10–12 Czech Republic
    - Draw 2:
      - Russia 7–5 Italy
      - Scotland 2–12 Denmark
      - Switzerland 5–7 Germany
      - Sweden 12–0 Czech Republic
      - Norway 6–8 Latvia
        - Standings (after 2 draws): Sweden, Germany 2–0, Scotland, Czech Republic, Italy, Russia, Denmark, Latvia 1–1, Norway, Switzerland 0–2.

==== Field hockey ====
- Men's Champions Trophy in Auckland, New Zealand:
  - Pool A:
    - Australia 3–2 Spain
    - Great Britain 2–1 Pakistan
  - Pool B:
    - Germany 2–1 New Zealand
    - Netherlands 2–0 South Korea

==== Football (soccer) ====
- CAF U-23 Championship in Morocco (teams in **bold** qualify for the semifinals):
  - Group B:
    - **Egypt** 2–0 South Africa
    - **Gabon** 3–1 Ivory Coast
      - Final standings: Egypt 6 points, Gabon, Côte d'Ivoire 4, South Africa 2.
- OFC Champions League group stage Matchday 3:
  - Group A: Mont-Dore (New Caledonia) 0–1 (New Zealand) Waitakere United
    - Standings (after 3 matches): Waitakere United 9 points, (French Polynesia) Tefana 4, (Fiji) Ba 3, Mont-Dore 1.
- J.League Division 1, final matchday (teams in **bold** qualify for the AFC Champions League):
  - Urawa Red Diamonds 1–3 **Kashiwa Reysol**
  - Albirex Niigata 0–1 **Nagoya Grampus**
  - Shimizu S-Pulse 1–3 **Gamba Osaka**
    - Standings: Kashiwa Reysol 72 points, Nagoya Grampus 71, Gamba Osaka 70.
    - Kashiwa Reysol win the title for the first time, and will represent Japan at the FIFA Club World Cup.

==== Handball ====
- World Women's Championship in Brazil:
  - Group A in Santos:
    - Montenegro 21–22 Iceland
    - Norway 28–31 Germany
    - Angola 30–29 China
  - Group B in Barueri:
    - Kazakhstan 37–9 Australia
    - Russia 39–24 South Korea
    - Netherlands 27–34 Spain
  - Group C in São Paulo:
    - Romania 30–28 Tunisia
    - France 41–22 Japan
  - Group D in São Bernardo do Campo:
    - Sweden 37–11 Argentina
    - Denmark 36–10 Uruguay
    - Croatia 36–20 Ivory Coast

==== Nordic combined ====
- World Cup in Lillehammer, Norway:
  - HS 100 / 10 km: (gold) Håvard Klemetsen (NOR) 27:44.4 (silver) Alessandro Pittin (ITA) 27:44.6 (bronze) Tino Edelmann (GER) 27:53.0
    - Standings (after 3 of 23 races): (1) Edelmann 220 points (2) Magnus Krog (NOR) 169 (3) Klemetsen 165

==== Rugby union ====
- IRB Sevens World Series:
  - Dubai Sevens in Dubai, United Arab Emirates:
    - Shield: **Samoa** 31–17 Kenya
    - Bowl: United States 0–26 **Scotland**
    - Plate: **Australia** 17–14 South Africa
    - Cup: **England** 29–12 France
      - Standings (after 2 of 9 competitions): (1) Fiji 39 points (2) England 32 (3) France, New Zealand & South Africa 29
- End of year tests in Cardiff: Wales 18–24 Australia

==== Short track speed skating ====
- World Cup 3 in Nagoya, Japan (KOR unless stated):
  - Men's 1000m (1): Kwak Yoon-Gy 1:29.743 (silver) J. R. Celski (USA) 1:29.828 (bronze) Seo Yi-Ra 1:29.899
    - Standings (after 3 of 8 races): (1) Kwak 2512 points (2) Celski 1312 (3) Olivier Jean (CAN) 1152
  - Men's 1500m: (gold) Noh Jin-Kyu 2:14.941 (silver) Lee Ho-Suk 2:15.127 (bronze) Charle Cournoyer (CAN) 2:15.392
    - Standings (after 4 of 8 races): (1) Noh 3000 points (2) Lee & Kwak 1600
  - Women's 1000m (1): (gold) Yui Sakai (JPN) 1:32.713 (silver) Elise Christie (GBR) 1:32.786 (bronze) Katherine Reutter (USA) 1:32.945
    - Standings (after 3 of 8 races): (1) Sakai 2410 points (2) Christie 1928 (3) Marianne St-Gelais (CAN) 1035
  - Women's 1500m: (gold) Arianna Fontana (ITA) 2:24.329 (silver) Cho Ha-Ri 2:24.423 (bronze) Lana Gehring (USA) 2:24.721
    - Standings (after 4 of 8 races): (1) Lee Eun-Byul 2502 points (2) Fontana 2262 (3) Reutter 2000

==== Skeleton ====
- World Cup in Igls, Austria:
  - Men: (gold) Martins Dukurs (LAT) 1:45.64 (52.69, 52.95) (silver) Aleksandr Tretyakov (RUS) 1:46.74 (53.25, 53.49) (bronze) Tomass Dukurs (LAT) 1:46.77 (53.22, 53.55)
  - Team: (gold) Germany I (Frank Rommel, Sandra Kiriasis/Stephanie Schneider, Anja Huber, Maximilian Arndt/Jan Speer) 3:35.03 (53.28, 53.84, 55.12, 52.79) (silver) Germany II (Alexander Kröckel, Anja Schneiderheinze-Stöckel/Christin Senkel, Marion Thees, Manuel Machata/Michail Makarow) 3:35.13 (53.40, 53.70, 55.32, 52.71) (bronze) Russia I (Tretyakov, Olga Fyodorova/Yulia Timofeeva, Olga Potylitsina, Alexander Kasjanov/Maxim Mokrousov) 3:35.29 (53.37, 54.10, 54.94, 52.88)

==== Ski jumping ====
- World Cup in Lillehammer, Norway:
  - Men's HS 100: (gold) Andreas Kofler (AUT) 279.3 points (silver) Richard Freitag (GER) 273.3 (bronze) Kamil Stoch (POL) 249.6
    - Standings (after 2 of 27 events): (1) Kofler 200 points (2) Gregor Schlierenzauer (AUT) 120 (3) Stoch 110
  - Women's HS 100: (gold) Sarah Hendrickson (USA) 277.0 points (silver) Coline Mattel (FRA) 247.7 (bronze) Melanie Faisst (GER) 245.5

==== Snooker ====
- UK Championship in York, England, last 32:
  - **Ding Junhui** (CHN) 6–5 Mark Davis (ENG)
  - **John Higgins** (SCO) 6–5 Rory McLeod (ENG)
  - **Graeme Dott** (SCO) 6–1 Matthew Selt (ENG)
  - **Neil Robertson** (AUS) 6–1 Tom Ford (ENG)
  - **Matthew Stevens** (WAL) 6–2 Marcus Campbell (SCO)
  - **Stephen Maguire** (SCO) 6–3 Stephen Hendry (SCO)

==== Speed skating ====
- World Cup 3 in Heerenveen, Netherlands (NED unless stated):
  - Men's 500m: (gold) Pekka Koskela (FIN) 35.01 (silver) Joji Kato (JPN) 35.02 (bronze) Jesper Hospes 35.06
    - Standings (after 6 of 12 races): (1) Mo Tae-Bum (KOR) 400 points (2) Kato 373 (3) Tucker Fredricks (USA) 348
  - Men's 10,000m: (gold) Jorrit Bergsma 12:50.33 (silver) Bob de Jong 12:55.11 (bronze) Bob de Vries 13:03.41
    - Standings (after 3 of 6 races): (1) Bergsma 280 points (2) Sven Kramer 210 (3) de Jong 190
  - Women's 500m: (gold) Yu Jing (CHN) 37.67 (silver) Jenny Wolf (GER) 38.19 (bronze) Laurine van Riessen 38.20
    - Standings (after 6 of 12 races): (1) Lee Sang-Hwa (KOR) 450 points (2) Wolf 420 (3) Yu 400
  - Women's 1500m: (gold) Christine Nesbitt (CAN) 1:55.68 (silver) Ireen Wüst 1:57.15 (bronze) Yekaterina Shikhova (RUS) 1:57.17
    - Standings (after 3 of 6 races): (1) Nesbitt 280 points (2) Wüst 250 (3) Shikhova 148

==== Tennis ====
- Davis Cup Final, day 2: Spain 2–1 Argentina
  - David Nalbandian/Eduardo Schwank (ARG) def. Feliciano López/Fernando Verdasco (ESP) 6–4, 6–2, 6–3

==== Volleyball ====
- FIVB Men's World Cup in Japan, Matchday 10 (teams in **bold** qualify for the 2012 Olympics):
  - Iran 0–3 **Russia**
  - **Poland** 2–3 Brazil
  - Japan 0–3 Italy
  - Serbia 3–1 China
  - Argentina 3–0 Egypt
  - Cuba 2–3 United States
    - Standings (after 10 matches): Russia 27 points, Poland 25, Brazil, Italy 21, Cuba 17, United States 16, Argentina 13, Iran, Serbia 12, Japan 8, China 5, Egypt 3.

=== December 2, 2011 (Friday) ===
==== Alpine skiing ====
- Men's World Cup in Beaver Creek, United States:
  - Downhill: (gold) Bode Miller (USA) 1:43.82 (silver) Beat Feuz (SUI) 1:43.86 (bronze) Klaus Kröll (AUT) 1:43.96
    - Downhill standings (after 2 of 11 races): (1) Feuz 160 points (2) Didier Cuche (SUI) & Miller 129
    - Overall standings (after 4 of 45 races): (1) Cuche 209 points (2) Miller 187 (3) Aksel Lund Svindal (NOR) 185
- Women's World Cup in Lake Louise, Canada:
  - Downhill: (gold) Lindsey Vonn (USA) 1:53.19 (silver) Tina Weirather (LIE) 1:55.14 (bronze) Dominique Gisin (SUI) 1:55.25
    - Overall standings (after 4 of 40 races): (1) Viktoria Rebensburg (GER) 230 points (2) Vonn 222 (3) Elisabeth Görgl (AUT) 151

==== American football ====
- NCAA Football Bowl Subdivision Championship Games:
  - Pac-12 in Eugene, Oregon: Oregon 49, UCLA 31
    - The Ducks will play in the Rose Bowl.
  - MAC in Detroit, Michigan: Northern Illinois 23, Ohio 20.

==== Biathlon ====
- World Cup 1 in Östersund, Sweden:
  - Men's 10 km Sprint: (gold) Carl Johan Bergman (SWE) 24:22.5 (0+0) (silver) Tarjei Bø (NOR) 24:30.1 (0+0) (bronze) Emil Hegle Svendsen (NOR) 24:35.5 (0+1)
    - Overall standings (after 2 of 26 races): (1) Martin Fourcade (FRA) 103 points (2) Michal Šlesingr (CZE) 88 (3) Bergman 82

==== Bobsleigh ====
- World Cup in Igls, Austria:
  - Two-woman: (gold) Anja Schneiderheinze-Stöckel/Lisette Thöne (GER) 1:47.26 (53.69, 53.57) (silver) Sandra Kiriasis/Petra Lammert (GER) 1:47.44 (53.82, 53.62) (bronze) Elana Meyers/Katie Eberling (USA) 1:47.82 (53.90, 53.92) & Christina Hengster/Inga Versen (AUT) 1:47.82 (53.95, 53.87)

==== Cricket ====
- New Zealand in Australia:
  - 1st Test in Woolloongabba, Brisbane, day 2: New Zealand 295 (82.5 overs); Australia 154/3 (46 overs). Australia trail by 141 runs with 7 wickets remaining in the 1st innings.
- West Indies in India:
  - 2nd ODI in Visakhapatnam: West Indies 269/9 (50 overs); India 270/5 (48.1 overs; Virat Kohli 117). **India win by 5 wickets; lead 5-match series 2–0.**

==== Football (soccer) ====
- CAF U-23 Championship in Morocco (teams in **bold** advance to the semifinals):
  - Group A:
    - Nigeria 4–1 Algeria
    - **Morocco** 0–1 **Senegal**
      - Final standings: Senegal, Morocco 6 points, Nigeria, Algeria 3.
- OFC Champions League group stage Matchday 3:
  - Group A: Tefana (French Polynesia) 4–1 (Fiji) Ba
    - Standings: (New Zealand) Waitakere United 6 points (2 matches), Tefana 4 (3), Ba 3 (3), (New Caledonia) Mont-Dore 1 (2).

==== Handball ====
- World Women's Championship in Brazil:
  - Group C in São Paulo: Brazil 37–21 Cuba

==== Skeleton ====
- World Cup in Igls, Austria:
  - Women: (gold) Olga Potylitsina (RUS) 1:49.39 (54.71, 54.68) (silver) Emma Lincoln-Smith (AUS) 1:49.62 (54.66, 54.96) (bronze) Mellisa Hollingsworth (CAN) 1:49.66 (54.76, 54.90)

==== Speed skating ====
- World Cup 3 in Heerenveen, Netherlands:
  - 500m Women: (gold) Yu Jing (CHN) 37.84 (silver) Lee Sang-Hwa (KOR) 37.91 (bronze) Wang Beixing (CHN) 38.17
    - Standings (after 5 of 12 races): (1) Lee 390 points (2) Jenny Wolf (GER) 340 (3) Yu 300
  - 500m Men: (gold) Tucker Fredricks (USA) 34.98 (silver) Joji Kato (JPN) 35.07 (bronze) Mo Tae-Bum (KOR) 35.08
    - Standings (after 5 of 12 races): (1) Mo 355 points (2) Kato 293 (3) Fredricks 288
  - 5000m Women: (gold) Martina Sáblíková (CZE) 6:58.87 (silver) Claudia Pechstein (GER) 7:02.92 (bronze) Stephanie Beckert (GER) 7:04.77
    - Standings (after 3 of 6 races): (1) Sáblíková 300 points (2) Pechstein 230 (3) Linda de Vries (NED) 156
  - 1500m Men: (gold) Ivan Skobrev (RUS) 1:45.81 (silver) Kjeld Nuis (NED) 1:45.99 (bronze) Håvard Bøkko (NOR) 1:46.49
    - Standings (after 3 of 6 races): (1) Skobrev 202 points (2) Nuis 190 (3) Denny Morrison (CAN) & Shani Davis (USA) 180

==== Tennis ====
- Davis Cup Final, day 1: Spain 2–0 Argentina
  - Rafael Nadal (ESP) def. Juan Mónaco (ARG) 6–1, 6–1, 6–2
  - David Ferrer (ESP) def. Juan Martín del Potro (ARG) 6–2, 6–7(2), 3–6, 6–4, 6–3

==== Volleyball ====
- FIVB Men's World Cup in Japan, Matchday 9:
  - Iran 0–3 Brazil
  - Poland 3–2 Italy
  - Japan 0–3 Russia
  - Serbia 3–1 Egypt
  - Cuba 3–2 China
  - Argentina 2–3 United States
    - Standings (after 9 matches): Russia, Poland 24 points, Brazil 19, Italy 18, Cuba 16, United States 14, Iran 12, Argentina 10, Serbia 9, Japan 8, China 5, Egypt 3.

=== December 1, 2011 (Thursday) ===
==== Baseball ====
- Nippon Professional Baseball awards:
  - Most Valuable Players:
    - Central League: Takuya Asao, Chunichi Dragons
    - Pacific League: Seiichi Uchikawa, Fukuoka SoftBank Hawks

==== Basketball ====
- Euroleague Regular Season Matchday 7 (team in **bold** qualify for Top 16):
  - Group A:
    - Fenerbahçe Ülker (Turkey) 86–70 (Greece) Olympiacos
    - Bennet Cantù (Italy) 71–68 (Spain) Caja Laboral
      - Standings: Caja Laboral, Fenerbahçe Ülker, Bennet Cantù 4–3, Olympiacos, (Spain) Gescrap Bizkaia, (France) SLUC Nancy 3–4.
  - Group C:
    - EA7 Emporio Armani (Italy) 65–72 (Spain) Real Madrid
    - Partizan Mt:s Belgrade (Serbia) 74–71 (Israel) Maccabi Tel Aviv
      - Standings: Maccabi Tel Aviv, Real Madrid 5–2, (Turkey) Anadolu Efes, Partizan Mt:s Belgrade 4–3, EA7 Emporio Armani 2–5, (Belgium) Spirou Charleroi 1–6.
  - Group D:
    - **UNICS Kazan** (Russia) 72–61 (Turkey) Galatasaray Medical Park
    - Union Olimpija Ljubljana (Slovenia) 57–63 (Italy) **Montepaschi Siena**
    - Asseco Prokom Gdynia (Poland) 45–76 (Spain) **FC Barcelona Regal**
      - Standings: FC Barcelona Regal 7–0, Montepaschi Siena, UNICS Kazan 5–2, Galatasaray Medical Park 3–4, Union Olimpija Ljubljana 1–6, Asseco Prokom Gdynia 0–7.

==== Biathlon ====
- World Cup 1 in Östersund, Sweden:
  - Women's 15 km Individual: (gold) Darya Domracheva (BLR) 47:15.6 (1+1+0+0) (silver) Anna Maria Nilsson (SWE) 48:24.1 (1+0+0+0) (bronze) Magdalena Neuner (GER) 48:57.3 (0+1+0+2)

==== Cricket ====
- New Zealand in Australia:
  - 1st Test in Woolloongabba, Brisbane, day 1: New Zealand 176/5 (51 overs); Australia.
- Pakistan in Bangladesh:
  - 1st ODI in Mirpur: Bangladesh 91 (30.3 overs; Shahid Afridi 5/23); Pakistan 93/5 (25.4 overs). **Pakistan win by 5 wickets; lead 3-match series 1–0.**

==== Football (soccer) ====
- UEFA Europa League group stage Matchday 5 (teams in **bold** qualify for Round of 32):
  - Group D:
    - **Sporting CP** (Portugal) 2–0 (Switzerland) Zürich
    - Vaslui (Romania) 0–0 (Italy) Lazio
      - Standings (after 5 matches): Sporting CP 12 points, Vaslui, Lazio 6, Zürich 2.
  - Group E:
    - **Stoke City** (England) 1–1 (Ukraine) Dynamo Kyiv
    - Maccabi Tel Aviv (Israel) 2–3 (Turkey) Beşiktaş
      - Standings (after 5 matches): Stoke City 11 points, Beşiktaş 9, Dynamo Kyiv 6, Maccabi Tel Aviv 1.
  - Group F:
    - **Athletic Bilbao** (Spain) 2–1 (Slovakia) Slovan Bratislava
    - Red Bull Salzburg (Austria) 2–0 (France) Paris Saint-Germain
      - Standings (after 5 matches): Athletic Bilbao 13 points, Red Bull Salzburg, Paris Saint-Germain 7, Slovan Bratislava 1.
  - Group J:
    - AEK Larnaca (Cyprus) 2–1 (Israel) Maccabi Haifa
    - **Schalke 04** (Germany) 2–1 (Romania) Steaua București
      - Standings (after 5 matches): Schalke 04 11 points, Maccabi Haifa 6, Steaua București, AEK Larnaca 5.
  - Group K:
    - Odense (Denmark) 1–2 (Poland) Wisła Kraków
    - **Twente** (Netherlands) 1–0 (England) Fulham
      - Standings (after 5 matches): Twente 13 points, Fulham 7, Wisła Kraków 6, Odense 3.
  - Group L:
    - **Lokomotiv Moscow** (Russia) 3–1 (Austria) Sturm Graz
    - AEK Athens (Greece) 1–2 (Belgium) **Anderlecht**
      - Standings (after 5 matches): Anderlecht 15 points, Lokomotiv Moscow 12, Sturm Graz 3, AEK Athens 0.
