= 2008 Dublin Horse Show – Samsung Super League =

The seventh event of the 2008 Samsung Super League was held in Dublin, Ireland on 8 August 2008 during the 2008 Dublin Horse Show. The Great Britain won the event, finishing with only fourteen penalties over the two rounds of competition, five fewer than host nation Ireland's nineteen faults. Jessica Kürten of Ireland, Harry Smolders of the Netherlands, and Hillary Dobbs of the United States were the only riders to complete a clear round and were each awarded one point in the top rider standings. A €156,000 purse was offered at the CSIO***** event, with each of the eight competing teams receiving a share.

== Competing teams ==
Belgium	Germany	Ireland	Netherlands
Niels Bruynseels; Pieter Devos; Philippe Le Jeune; Patrik Spits	Marcus Ehning; Alois Pollmann-Schweckhorst; Thomas Voss; Holger Wulschner	Jessica Kürten; Denis Lynch; Eddie Macken; Cian O'Connor	Gert-Jan Bruggink; Piet Raymakers; Harry Smolders; Mathijs van Asten
Sweden	Switzerland	(United Kingdom) Great Britain	United States
Jens Fredricson; Peder Fredricson; Jannike West; Royne Zetterman	Markus Fuchs; Theo Muff; Philippe Putallaz; Jane Richard	Peter Charles; Tim Gredley; Nick Skelton; Robert Smith	Hillary Dobbs; Lauren Hough; Charlie Jayne; Nicole Shahinian-Simpson

== Results ==
=== Round A ===
	Team	Rider	Horse	Penalties
1	(United Kingdom) Great Britain	Peter Charles	Murka's Rupert R	1
1	(United Kingdom) Great Britain	Tim Gredley	Omelli	5
1	(United Kingdom) Great Britain	Robert Smith	Vangelis S	9
1	(United Kingdom) Great Britain	Nick Skelton	Arko III	1
1	(United Kingdom) Great Britain			7
2	United States	Lauren Hough	Quick Study	4
2	United States	Hillary Dobbs	Quincy B	0
2	United States	Charlie Jayne	Urbanus	8
2	United States	Nicole Shahinian-Simpson	Srf Dragonfly	4
2	United States			8
3	Netherlands	Piet Raymakers	Van Schijndel's Curtis	4
3	Netherlands	Gert-Jan Bruggink	Primeval Wings	8
3	Netherlands	Mathijs van Asten	Vdl Groep Castella	12
3	Netherlands	Harry Smolders	Walnut De Muze	0
3	Netherlands			12
4	Belgium	Philippe Le Jeune	Vigo D Arsouilles	4
4	Belgium	Patrik Spits	Withney Van De Dwerse Hagen	12
4	Belgium	Pieter Devos	Equipharma Tekila D	4
4	Belgium	Niels Bruynseels	Item De Quintin	8
4	Belgium			16
4	Ireland	Denis Lynch	Nabab's Son	1
4	Ireland	Eddie Macken	Tedechine Sept	14
4	Ireland	Jessica Kürten	Castle Forbes Libertina	4
4	Ireland	Cian O'Connor	Rancorrado	11
4	Ireland			16
6	Sweden	Royne Zetterman	Isaac	5
6	Sweden	Jens Fredricson	Lunatic	4
6	Sweden	Jannike West	Careful	8
6	Sweden	Peder Fredricson	H & M Arctic Arora Borealis	10
6	Sweden			17
7	Germany	Marcus Ehning	Noltes Kuchengirl	8
7	Germany	Thomas Voss	Leonardo B	8
7	Germany	Alois Pollmann-Schweckhorst	Lord Luis	5
7	Germany	Holger Wulschner	Clausen	12
7	Germany			21
8	Switzerland	Theo Muff	Con Spirito R	13
8	Switzerland	Jane Richard	Jalla De Gaverie	8
8	Switzerland	Philippe Putallaz	Kolebo Des Cabanes	17
8	Switzerland	Markus Fuchs	La Toya III	4
8	Switzerland			25

=== Round B ===
	Team	Rider	Horse	Round A	Round B	Total penalties	Prize €
	Team	Rider	Horse	Penalties	Penalties	Total penalties	Prize €
1	(United Kingdom) Great Britain	Peter Charles	Murka's Rupert R	1	1		
1	(United Kingdom) Great Britain	Tim Gredley	Omelli	5	5		
1	(United Kingdom) Great Britain	Robert Smith	Vangelis S	9	6		
1	(United Kingdom) Great Britain	Nick Skelton	Arko III	1	1		
1	(United Kingdom) Great Britain			7	7	14	€52,000
2	Ireland	Denis Lynch	Nabab's Son	1	1		
2	Ireland	Eddie Macken	Tedechine Sept	14	2		
2	Ireland	Jessica Kürten	Castle Forbes Libertina	4	0		
2	Ireland	Cian O'Connor	Rancorrado	11	Retired		
2	Ireland			16	3	19	€34,000
3	Germany	Marcus Ehning	Noltes Kuchengirl	8	1		
3	Germany	Thomas Voss	Leonardo B	8	1		
3	Germany	Alois Pollmann-Schweckhorst	Lord Luis	5	1		
3	Germany	Holger Wulschner	Clausen	12	1		
3	Germany			21	3	24	€24,000
4	United States	Lauren Hough	Quick Study	4	8		
4	United States	Hillary Dobbs	Quincy B	0	4		
4	United States	Charlie Jayne	Urbanus	8	16		
4	United States	Nicole Shahinian-Simpson	Srf Dragonfly	4	8		
4	United States			8	20	28	€17,500
5	Netherlands	Piet Raymakers	Van Schijndel's Curtis	4	4		
5	Netherlands	Gert-Jan Bruggink	Primeval Wings	8	12		
5	Netherlands	Mathijs van Asten	Vdl Groep Castella	12	12		
5	Netherlands	Harry Smolders	Walnut De Muze	0	4		
5	Netherlands			12	20	32	€12,000
6	Belgium	Philippe Le Jeune	Vigo D Arsouilles	4	9		
6	Belgium	Patrik Spits	Withney Van De Dwerse Hagen	12	13		
6	Belgium	Pieter Devos	Equipharma Tekila D	4	5		
6	Belgium	Niels Bruynseels	Item De Quintin	8	5		
6	Belgium			16	19	35	€8,500
7	Sweden	Royne Zetterman	Isaac	5	8		
7	Sweden	Jens Fredricson	Lunatic	4	13		
7	Sweden	Jannike West	Careful	8	8		
7	Sweden	Peder Fredricson	H & M Arctic Arora Borealis	10	17		
7	Sweden			17	29	46	€5,500
8	Switzerland	Theo Muff	Con Spirito R	13	12		
8	Switzerland	Jane Richard	Jalla De Gaverie	8	16		
8	Switzerland	Philippe Putallaz	Kolebo Des Cabanes	17	17		
8	Switzerland	Markus Fuchs	La Toya III	4	Did not start		
8	Switzerland			25	45	70	€2,500
