= 2008 Dublin Horse Show =

Horse show in Dublin

The 2008 Dublin Horse Show was hosted by the Royal Dublin Society (R.D.S.) at Ballsbridge, Dublin, Ireland, taking place between 6 August and 10 August. The competition was named after its main sponsor, Fáilte Ireland.

The show events were divided into two main areas, showing horses and show jumping. The showing classes are a major showcase of the best of the Irish horse. Some classes are restricted to Irish-bred horses.

This article concentrates on the major show jumping competitions.

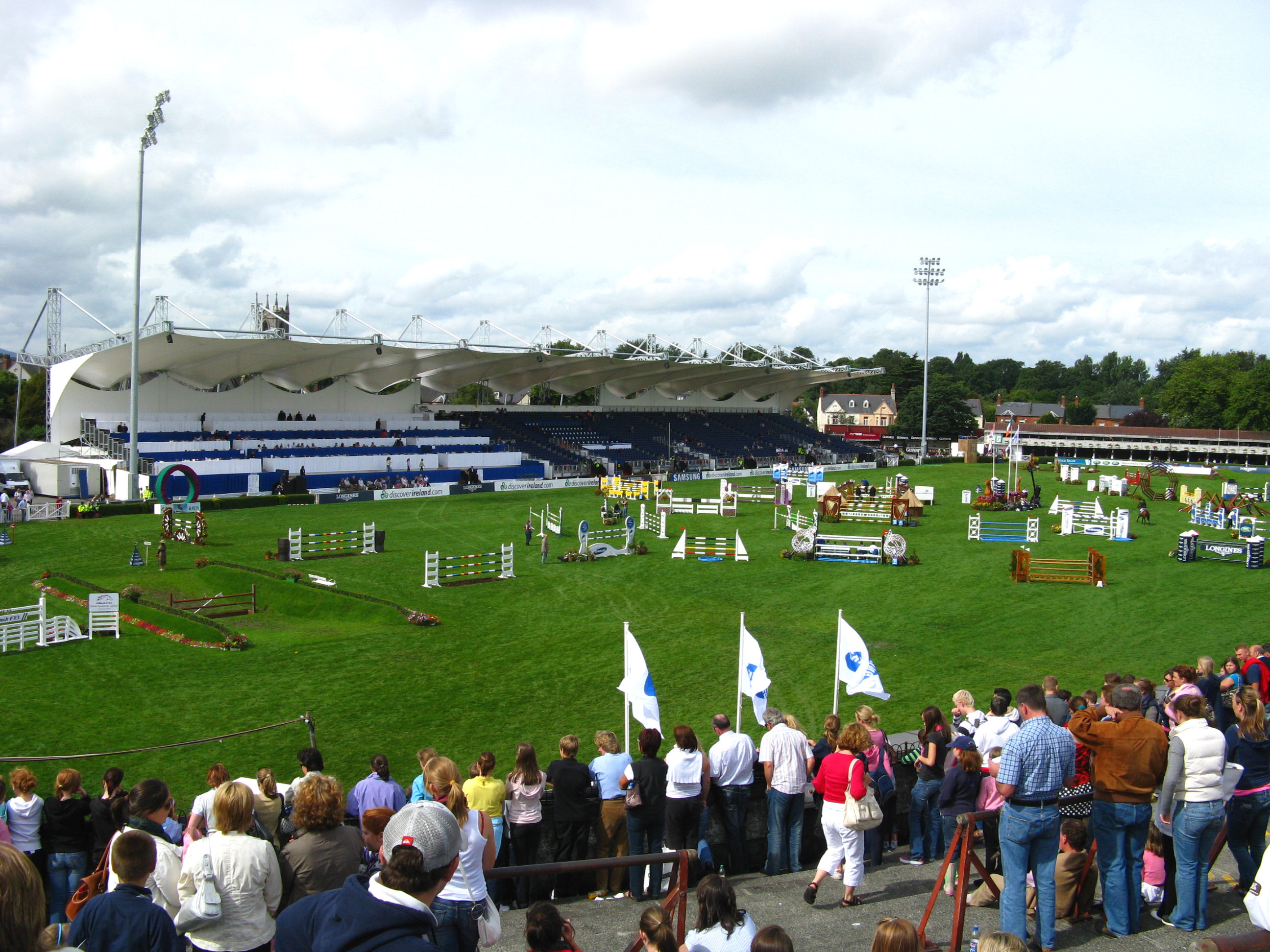
The main arena and grandstand during the 2008 show.

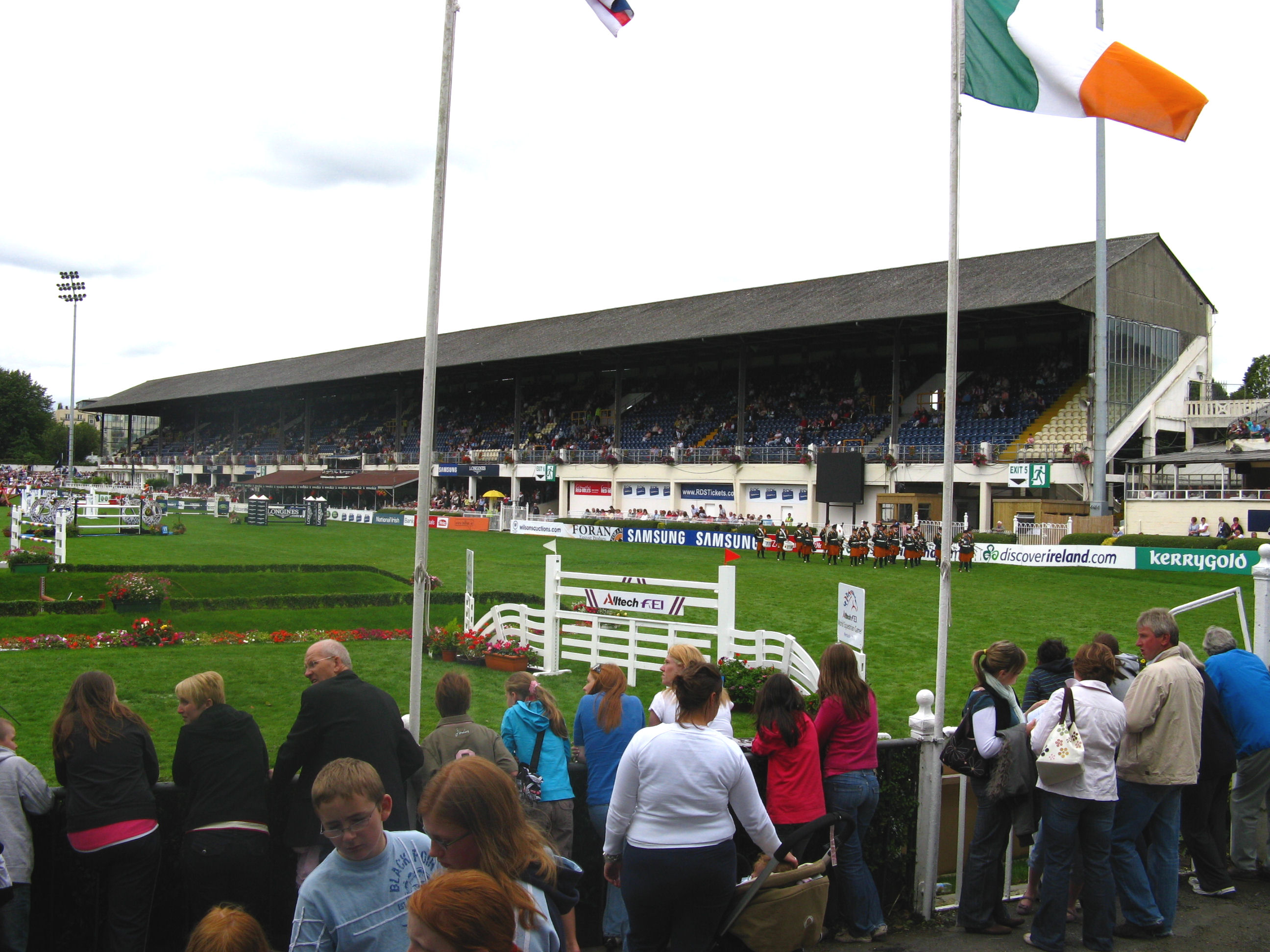
The Anglesea stand.

== Results ==
=== 6 August ===
==== Fáilte Stakes ====
Thirty-one riders competed in the 4,750 € Fáilte Stakes. The jumping height was 1.40 m for the Table A event. The top eight riders placed and received financial prizes.

	Rider	Horse	Penalties	Time (s)
1	(Sweden) Peder Fredricson	Maloubet De Pleville	0	70.86
2	(Netherlands) Gert-Jan Bruggink	Cash Jr.	0	71.24
3	(Republic of Ireland) Denis Lynch	Upsilon D'Ocquier	0	73.24

==== Speed Stakes ====
Thirty-five riders competed in the 10,500 € Speed Stakes. The jumping height was 1.40 m for the Table C event. The top nine riders placed and received financial prizes.

	Rider	Horse	Time (s)	Penalties	Total time (s)
1	(Netherlands) Gert-Jan Bruggink	Acodetto	58.74	0	58.74
2	(Republic of Ireland) Cian O'Connor	Baloufina	61.33	0	61.33
3	(Sweden) Peder Fredricson	Felini Skovsby	61.36	0	61.36

==== Irish Sports Council Classic ====
Fifty-eight riders competed in the 21,000 € Irish Sports Council Classic. The jumping height was 1.50 m for the Table C event with jump-off. The top fifteen riders placed and received financial prizes.

	Rider	Horse	Round 1		Jump-off	
	Rider	Horse	Penalties	Time (s)	Penalties	Time (s)
1	(Switzerland) Markus Fuchs	La Toya III	0	69.34	0	39.35
2	(United States) Lauren Hough	Casadora	0	71.07	0	39.49
3	(Republic of Ireland) Darragh Kerins	Night Train	0	70.84	0	40.60

=== 7 August ===
==== Power and Speed ====
Fifty-three riders competed in the 21,000 € Power and Speed. The class was sponsored by Knight Frank LLP. The jumping height was 1.50 m for the Table A event. The top fourteen riders placed and received financial prizes.

	Rider	Horse	Round 1		Jump-off	
	Rider	Horse	Penalties	Time (s)	Penalties	Time (s)
1	(Republic of Ireland) Jessica Kürten	Castle Forbes Cosma	0	59.14	0	37.23
2	(Republic of Ireland) Conor Swail	Gold Digger	0	62.19	0	37.63
3	(Belgium) Niels Bruynseels	Upsilon D'Ocquier	0	64.98	0	38.13

==== Speed Derby ====
Twenty-nine riders competed in the 21,000 € Speed Derby. The jumping height was 1.40 m for the Table C event. The top eight riders placed and received financial prizes.

	Rider	Horse	Time (s)	Penalties	Total time (s)
1	(Switzerland) Philippe Putallaz	Maastricht D	85.43	0	85.43
2	(Republic of Ireland) Shane Carey	Cashla Bay	85.78	0	85.78
3	(Republic of Ireland) Cameron Hanley	Siec Royal Star	86.01	0	86.01

==== Six Bar ====
Nineteen riders competed in the 16,000 € Six Bar. The top eight riders placed and received financial prizes.

	Rider	Horse	Round 1	Jump-off 1	Jump-off 2	Jump-off 3	Jump-off 4
	Rider	Horse	Penalties	Penalties	Penalties	Penalties	Penalties
1	(United States) Lauren Hough	Pits Daughter	0	0	0	0	0
1	(Belgium) Dirk Demeersman	Cicero Z Van Paemel	0	0	0	0	0
3	(Republic of Ireland) Shane Breen	Lyssegan Clover Diamond	0	0	0	0	4
3	(Netherlands) Jurgen Stenfert	BMC Vayom	0	0	0	0	4

=== 8 August ===
==== Samsung Super League ====
Eight teams of four riders competed in the 156,000 € Samsung Super League event, the seventh event in the 2008 Samsung Super League series. There were two rounds to the event, with all teams placing and receiving financial prizes.

	Team	Rider	Horse	Round A	Round B	Total penalties
	Team	Rider	Horse	Penalties	Penalties	Total penalties
1	United Kingdom	Peter Charles	Murka's Rupert R	1	1	
1	United Kingdom	Tim Gredley	Omelli	5	5	
1	United Kingdom	Robert Smith	Vangelis S	9	6	
1	United Kingdom	Nick Skelton	Arko III	1	1	
1	United Kingdom			7	7	14
2	Ireland	Denis Lynch	Nabab's Son	1	1	
2	Ireland	Eddie Macken	Tedechine Sept	14	2	
2	Ireland	Jessica Kürten	Castle Forbes Libertina	4	0	
2	Ireland	Cian O'Connor	Rancorrado	11	Retired	
2	Ireland			16	3	19
3	Germany	Marcus Ehning	Noltes Kuchengirl	8	1	
3	Germany	Thomas Voss	Leonardo B	8	1	
3	Germany	Alois Pollmann-Schweckhorst	Lord Luis	5	1	
3	Germany	Holgar Wulschner	Clausen	12	1	
3	Germany			21	3	24

=== 9 August ===
==== Accumulator ====
Thirty-five riders competed in the 15,750 € Accumulator. The jumping height was from 1.35 m to 1.60 m for the accumulator with joker event. The top nine riders placed and received financial prizes.

	Rider	Horse	Points	Time (s)
1	(United Kingdom) Robert Smith	Mr. Springfield	65	60.35
2	(Netherlands) Piet Raymakers	Van Schijndel's Now Or Never	65	60.72
3	(Switzerland) Markus Fuchs	Sylver II	65	61.19

==== Speed Derby ====
Forty-five riders competed in the 21,000 € Dublin Stakes. The jumping height was 1.50 m for the Table A event. The top twelve riders placed and received financial prizes.

	Rider	Horse	Round 1		Jump-off	
	Rider	Horse	Penalties	Time (s)	Penalties	Time (s)
1	(United Kingdom) Peter Charles	Murka's Pom D'Ami	0	84.73	0	47.37
2	(Republic of Ireland) David O'Brien	Mo Chroi	0	84.21	0	47.76
3	(Germany) Marcus Ehning	Vulkano Frh	0	86.24	0	47.88

==== Land Rover Puissance ====
Eleven riders competed in the 36,000 € Land Rover Puissance. The class was sponsored by Land Rover. The top five riders placed and received financial prizes.

	Rider	Horse	Round 1	Jump-off 1	Jump-off 2	Jump-off 3	Jump-off 4
	Rider	Horse	Penalties	Penalties	Penalties	Penalties	Penalties
1	(Republic of Ireland) Neal Fearon	Candileto 4	0	0	0	0	0
2	(Belgium) Patrik Spits	Sherlock K	0	0	0	0	4
3	(United States) Michael Morrissey	Scaraberas	0	0	0	4	
3	(Republic of Ireland) Shane Breen	Lyssegan Clover Diamond	0	0	0	4	
3	(Republic of Ireland) Dermott Lennon	Lanceretto	0	0	0	4	

=== 10 August ===
==== Speed Championship ====
Twenty riders competed in the 26,000 € Speed Championship. The class was sponsored by Walls Construction Ltd. The jumping height from 1.40 m to 1.50 m for the Table C event. The top seven riders placed and received financial prizes.

	Rider	Horse	Time (s)	Penalties	Total time (s)
1	(Netherlands) Gert-Jan Bruggink	Acodetto	72.13	4	76.13
2	(United States) Hillary Dobbs	Corlett	77.80	0	77.80
3	(Belgium) Dirk Demeersman	Phaline K	78.16	0	78.16

==== Longines International Grand Prix ====
Thirty-nine riders competed in the 130,000 € Longines International Grand Prix. The class was sponsored by Longines. The jumping height was 1.50 m for the Table A event which occurred over two rounds. The top ten riders placed and received financial prizes.

	Rider	Horse	Round A		Round B		Total penalties
	Rider	Horse	Penalties	Time (s)	Penalties	Time (s)	Total penalties
1	(Republic of Ireland) Jessica Kürten	Castle Forbes Libertina	0	83.78	0	63.56	0
2	(Belgium) Patrik Spits	Withney Van De Dwerse Hagen	1	85.27	0	70.43	1
3	(Germany) Alois Pollmann-Schweckhorst	Lord Luis	1	87.81	0	73.97	1
