= 2008 Samsung Super League =

The 2008 Samsung Super League was the 2008 edition of the Samsung Super League, the premier international team Grand Prix show jumping competition run by the FEI and sponsored by Samsung Electronics. It was held at eight European venues from May 9 to September 21, 2008. Germany won the series for the third consecutive year, while Ludger Beerbaum of Germany won the title of top rider. Sweden was relegated to the 2009 FEI Nations Cup after finishing last in the eight team series.

== 2008 show schedule ==
Date	Show	Winning team	Top rider(s)
May 9, 2008	2008 Jumping International de France; France La Baule, France; CSIO***** €135,000	Belgium	(Belgium) Ludo Philippaerts on Cavalor's Winningmood (France) Michel Robert on Koro d'Or
May 23, 2008	2008 Piazza di Siena 2008 (Italy) Rome, Italy; CSIO***** €136,000	(United Kingdom) Great Britain	(United Kingdom) Tim Stockdale on Corlato (United Kingdom) John Whitaker on Peppermill (United States) Will Simpson on Carlson vom Dach
May 30, 2008	2008 CSIO Schweiz (Switzerland) St. Gallen, Switzerland; CSIO*****; 210,000 CHF	Netherlands	(Netherlands) Vincent Voorn on Alpapillon-Armanie (Belgium) Jos Lansink on Valentina van't Heike
June 20, 2008	2008 CHIO Rotterdam (Netherlands) Rotterdam, Netherlands; CSIO***** €150,000	Germany	(Germany) Ludger Beerbaum on Coupe de Coeur (Switzerland) Pius Schwizer on Nobless M
July 3, 2008	2008 CHIO Aachen (Germany) Aachen, Germany; CSIO***** €150,000	Germany	(Netherlands) Albert Zoer on Sam
July 25, 2008	2008 Royal International Horse Show (United Kingdom) Hickstead, United Kingdom; CSIO*****; 200,000 CHF	Germany	(United Kingdom) Charlotte Platt on Paulien II
August 8, 2008	2008 Dublin Horse Show (Republic of Ireland) Dublin, Ireland; CSIO***** €156,000	(United Kingdom) Great Britain	(United States) Hillary Dobbs on Quincy B (Republic of Ireland) Jessica Kürten on Castle Forbes Libertina (Netherlands) Harry Smolders on Walnut de Muze
September 21, 2008	2008 CSIO Barcelona (Spain) Barcelona, Spain; CSIO***** €134,200	Germany	(Germany) Ludger Beerbaum on All Inclusive NRW (Germany) Marco Kutscher on Cornet Obolensky

== Standings ==
=== Overall ===
	Team	Points								Total
	Team	FRA (France)	ITA (Italy)	SUI (Switzerland)	NED (Netherlands)	GER (Germany)	GBR (United Kingdom)	IRL (Republic of Ireland)	ESP (Spain)	Total
1	Germany	1	5	6	10	10	10	5	20	67.00
2	(United Kingdom) Great Britain	2	10	3	4	4.5	6	10	6	45.50
3	Netherlands	3	3.5	10	7	7	1	3	10	44.50
4	Belgium	10	2	2	5	0.5	2	2	14	37.50
5	Ireland	5.33	3.5	1	2	2	3	7	8	31.83
6	United States	5.33	7	4	0.5	4.5	0.5	4	2	27.83
7	Switzerland	5.33	0.75	6	3	1	4	0.5	4	24.58
8	Sweden	0.5	0.75	0.5	1	3	6	1	–	12.75

Sweden was relegated to the 2009 FEI Nations Cup Promotional League. Before the beginning of the 2009 season of the Meydan FEI Nations Cup (the follower of the Samsung Super League), the number of participating nations teams in the Meydan FEI Nations Cup has been increased up to ten. Thus, after the descent of Sweden, three nations starting positions are reassigned. This was done by the placement of best placed show jumpers from every nation in the world rankings. The emerging nations to the 2009 Meydan FEI Nations Cup were Sweden, France and Canada. The national equestrian federation of Canada refrained, so Italy moved into the Meydan FEI Nations Cup for the 2009 season.

=== Top rider ===
	Rider	Team	Points								Total
	Rider	Team	FRA (France)	ITA (Italy)	SUI (Switzerland)	NED (Netherlands)	GER (Germany)	GBR (United Kingdom)	IRL (Republic of Ireland)	ESP (Spain)	Total
1	Ludger Beerbaum	Germany	—	0	0	3	0	—	—	3	6
2	John Whitaker	(United Kingdom) Great Britain	—	3	1	1	0	—	—	—	5
2	Jos Lansink	Belgium	—	1	3	0	0	—	—	1	5
2	Will Simpson	United States	1	3	1	—	—	—	—	—	5
5	Marco Kutscher	Germany	—	0	1	0	0	—	—	3	4
5	Nicole Simpson	United States	—	1	1	—	—	1	0	1	4
5	Pius Schwizer	Switzerland	0	—	1	3	0	0	—	0	4
5	Tim Stockdale	(United Kingdom) Great Britain	—	3	1	—	0	—	—	0	4
9	Albert Zoer	Netherlands	—	—	—	—	3	—	—	—	3
9	Charlie Jayne	United States	1	1	1	—	—	—	0	—	3
9	Charlotte Platt	(United Kingdom) Great Britain	—	—	—	—	—	3	—	0	3
9	Christian Ahlmann	Germany	—	1	1	—	1	—	—	—	3
9	Cian O'Connor	Ireland	0	1	0	1	0	0	0	1	3
9	Denis Lynch	Ireland	1	0	1	—	1	0	0	—	3
9	Emilio Bicocchi	Italy	—	3	—	—	—	—	—	—	3
9	Ludo Philippaerts	Belgium	3	0	—	—	0	—	—	—	3
9	Michel Robert	France	3	—	—	—	—	—	—	—	3
9	Vincent Voorn	Netherlands	0	—	3	—	0	—	—	—	3
19	Carsten-Otto Nagel	Germany	—	—	1	—	—	—	—	1	2
19	Christina Liebherr	Switzerland	0	—	1	1	—	—	—	—	2
19	Edward Doyle	Ireland	0	1	0	0	1	—	—	—	2
19	Gerco Schröder	Netherlands	0	—	1	1	0	—	—	0	2
19	Harry Smolders	Netherlands	—	1	—	—	—	—	1	—	2
19	Helena Lundbäck	Sweden	1	0	0	—	0	1	—	0	2
19	Marc Houtzager	Netherlands	1	1	—	0	—	—	—	0	2
19	Meredith Michaels-Beerbaum	Germany	—	1	—	1	0	—	—	—	2
19	Nick Skelton	(United Kingdom) Great Britain	1	—	—	—	1	—	0	—	2
19	Philippe Le Jeune	Belgium	1	—	0	—	0	—	0	1	2
29	Angelique Hoorn	Netherlands	0	—	0	1	0	—	—	0	1
29	Beezie Madden	United States	—	—	—	—	1	—	—	—	1
29	Christophe Vanderhasselt	Belgium	—	—	—	—	—	—	—	1	1
29	David O'Brien	Ireland	—	—	—	1	0	0	—	0	1
29	Dirk Demeersman	Belgium	—	0	—	1	0	—	—	—	1
29	Giulia Martinengo Marquet	Italy	—	1	—	—	—	—	—	—	1
29	Hillary Dobbs	United States	—	—	—	—	—	0	1	—	1
29	Holger Wulschner	Germany	—	—	—	—	—	1	0	—	1
29	Jane Richard	Switzerland	1	—	—	—	—	0	0	—	1
29	Jessica Kürten	Ireland	—	0	—	—	—	—	1	—	1
29	Judy Ann Melchior	Belgium	1	—	0	—	—	—	—	—	1
29	Kevin Staut	France	1	—	—	—	—	—	—	—	1
29	Laura Kraut	United States	—	—	—	0	0	—	—	1	1
29	Leon Thijssen	Netherlands	—	—	—	—	—	—	—	1	1
29	Lotta Schultz	Sweden	0	—	0	1	—	0	—	—	1
29	McLain Ward	United States	—	—	—	0	1	—	—	—	1
29	Michael Whitaker	(United Kingdom) Great Britain	—	0	—	—	—	1	—	0	1
29	Niels Bruynseels	Belgium	0	—	—	0	—	1	0	—	1
29	Niklaus Schurtenberger	Switzerland	—	0	1	—	0	—	—	0	1
29	Peter Eriksson	Sweden	0	0	0	1	—	—	—	—	1
29	Piet Raymakers	Netherlands	—	—	1	0	—	—	0	—	1
29	Rolf-Göran Bengtsson	Sweden	—	1	—	—	0	—	—	—	1
29	Royne Zettermann	Sweden	—	—	—	—	0	1	0	—	1
29	Steve Guerdat	Switzerland	1	—	0	0	0	—	—	0	1
