= 2008 Global Champions Tour =

The 2008 Global Champions Tour was the third edition of the Global Champions Tour (GCT), an important international show jumping competition series. The 2008 Global Champions Tour was the first edition of the Global Champions Tour as official series of the FEI.

The series is held mainly in Europe, one competition and also the final are held outside of Europe. All competitions are endowed with 300000 €. All GCT events were held as CSI 5*.

The competitions was held between April 10, 2008 and September 14, 2008. The final was held in São Paulo, Brazil from October 15, 2008 to October 19, 2008.

The champion of the Global Champions Tour Final of this year is Jessica Kürten of Ireland on Libertina.

== Competitions ==
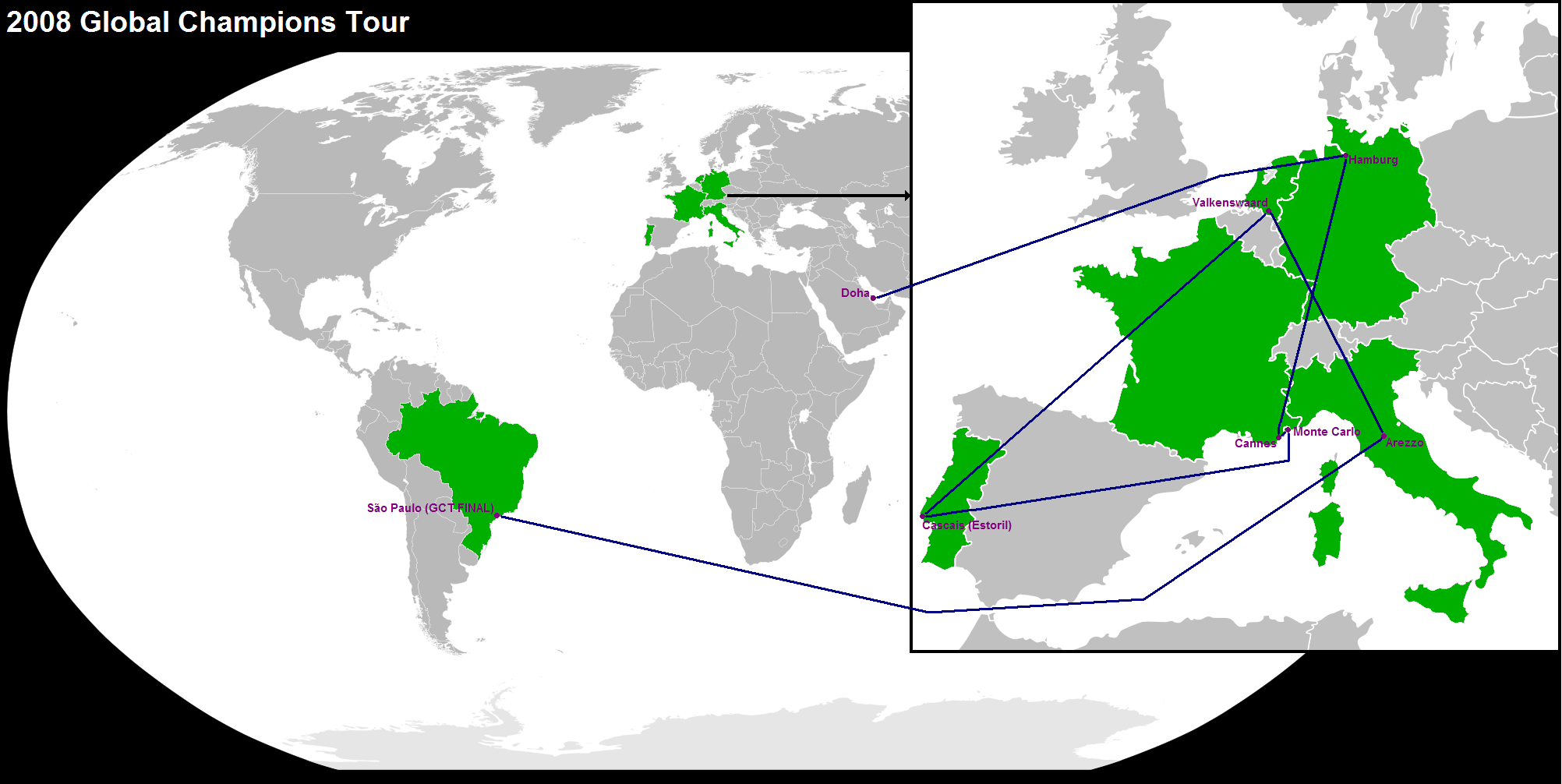
competitions of the 2008 Global Champions Tour

All competitions are held as competition over two rounds against the clock with one jump-off against the clock.

The placement of the riders, who are not qualified for the jump-off, results of the number of penalties of both rounds and the time of the first round. Competitors who are not qualified for the second round, placed behind the riders who compete in the second round.

=== 1st Competition: Global Champions Tour of Qatar ===
April 10, 2008 to April 12, 2008 - Doha, Qatar
Competition: Saturday, April 12, 2008 - Start: 6:00 pm, prize money: 300000 €

	Rider	Horse	Penalties		Time (s)	Jump-off		scoring points
	Rider	Horse	Round 1	Round 2	Round 1	Penalties	Time (s)	scoring points
1	(Republic of Ireland) Denis Lynch	Lantinus	0	0	-	0	49.49	20
2	(Germany) Alois Pollmann-Schweckhorst	Lord Luis	0	0	-	0	49.95	18
3	(Switzerland) Steve Guerdat	Jalisca Solier	0	0	-	0	50.69	16

(Top 3 of 39 Competitors)

=== 2nd Competition: Global Champions Tour of Germany ===
April 30, 2008 to May 4, 2008 - Hamburg (German show jumping and dressage derby), Germany
Competition: Saturday, May 3, 2008 - Start: 2:00 pm, prize money: 300000 €

	Rider	Horse	Penalties		Time (s)	Jump-off		scoring points
	Rider	Horse	Round 1	Round 2	Round 1	Penalties	Time (s)	scoring points
1	(Germany) Thomas Voss	Leonardo B	0	0	-	0	48.35	20
2	(Netherlands) Albert Zoer	Sam	0	0	-	4	48.21	18
3	(Germany) Meredith Michaels-Beerbaum	Checkmate	0	0	-	4	75.04	16

(Top 3 of 48 Competitors)

=== 3rd Competition: Global Champions Tour of France ===
June 12, 2008 to June 14, 2008 - Cannes, France
Competition: Saturday, June 14, 2008 - Start: 6:00 pm, prize money: 300000 €

	Rider	Horse	Penalties		Time (s)	Jump-off		scoring points
	Rider	Horse	Round 1	Round 2	Round 1	Penalties	Time (s)	scoring points
1	(Germany) Meredith Michaels-Beerbaum	Shutterfly	0	0	-	0	40.74	20
2	(Australia) Edwina Alexander	Itot du Chateau	0	0	-	0	43.74	18
3	(United Kingdom) Robert Whitaker	Lacroix	4	0	78.83			16

(Top 3 of 49 Competitors)

=== 4th Competition: Global Champions Tour of Monaco ===
June 26, 2008 to June 28, 2008 - shore at the marina „Port Hercule“, Monte Carlo, Monaco
Competition: Saturday, June 28, 2008 - Start: 6:00 pm, prize money: 300000 €

	Rider	Horse	Penalties		Time (s)	Jump-off		scoring points
	Rider	Horse	Round 1	Round 2	Round 1	Penalties	Time (s)	scoring points
1	(United States) Richard Spooner	Cristallo	0	0	-	0	38.99	20
2	(Germany) Marcus Ehning	Vulkano FRH	0	0	-	0	39.01	18
3	(Germany) Ulrich Kirchhoff	Carino	0	0	-	0	44.23	16

(Top 3 of 46 Competitors)

=== 5th Competition: Global Champions Tour of Portugal ===
July 10, 2008 to July 12, 2008 - Hipódromo Manuel Possolo, Cascais near Estoril, Portugal
Competition: Saturday, July 12, 2008 - Start: 7:30 pm, prize money: 300000 €

	Rider	Horse	Penalties		Time (s)	Jump-off		scoring points
	Rider	Horse	Round 1	Round 2	Round 1	Penalties	Time (s)	scoring points
1	(Germany) Meredith Michaels-Beerbaum	Checkmate	0	0	-	0	41.11	20
2	(Germany) Marco Kutscher	Cash	0	0	-	0	41.83	18
3	(United Kingdom) Nick Skelton	Arko	0	0	-	0	42.63	16

(Top 3 of 46 Competitors)

=== 6th Competition: Global Champions Tour of the Netherlands ===
July 31, 2008 - August 3, 2008 - Valkenswaard, Netherlands
Competition: Saturday, August 2, 2008 - Start: 1:45 pm, prize money: 300000 €

	Rider	Horse	Penalties		Time (s)	Jump-off		scoring points
	Rider	Horse	Round 1	Round 2	Round 1	Penalties	Time (s)	scoring points
1	(Germany) Daniel Deußer	Air Jordan Z	0	0	-	0	34.50	20
2	(United Kingdom) Nick Skelton	Arko	0	0	-	0	34.97	18
3	(Australia) Edwina Alexander	Socrates	0	0	-	0	36.69	16

(Top 3 of 47 Competitors)

=== 7th Competition: Global Champions Tour of Italy ===
September 11, 2008 to September 14, 2008 - Arezzo, Italy
Competition: Saturday, September 13, 2008 - Start: 1:00 pm, prize money: 300000 €

	Rider	Horse	Penalties		Time (s)	Jump-off		scoring points
	Rider	Horse	Round 1	Round 2	Round 1	Penalties	Time (s)	scoring points
1	(Germany) Meredith Michaels-Beerbaum	Shutterfly	0	0	83.76			20
2	(Belgium) Judy-Ann Melchior	Aktion Pur Z	0	1	84.82			18
3	(Switzerland) Steve Guerdat	Tresor	0	2	87.17			16

(Top 3 of 47 Competitors)

== Global Champions Tour Final ==
=== overall standings (after 7 competitions) ===
	Rider	1st Competition	2nd Competition	3rd Competition	4th Competition	5th Competition	6th Competition	7th Competition	scoring points (Total)
1	(United Kingdom) Nick Skelton	-	11	13	11	16	18	13	82
2	(Germany) Meredith Michaels-Beerbaum	0	16	20	-	20	0	20	76
3	(Australia) Edwina Alexander	4	0	18	9	9	16	12	68
4	(Belgium) Judy-Ann Melchior	15	10	8	0	3	5	18	59
5	(Germany) Marcus Ehning	0	0	0	18	10	10	15	53

(Top 5)

=== Final ===
October 15, 2008 to October 19, 2008 - Hipica Paulista, São Paulo (Athina Onassis International Horse Show), Brazil

==== First round ====
Competition: Thursday, October 16, 2008 - Start: 3:30 pm, prize money: 50000 €

	Rider	Horse	Penalties	Time (s)
1	(Belgium) Ludo Philippaerts	Winningmood	0	78.10
2	(Republic of Ireland) Jessica Kürten	Libertina	0	78.46
3	(United Kingdom) Tim Gredley	Omelli	0	79.02

(Top 3 of 25 Competitors)

==== Final result after second round and jump-off ====
Competition: Saturday, August 14, 2009 - Start: 8:00 pm, prize money: 900000 €

	Rider	Horse			Jump-off	
	Rider	Horse	Penalties	Time (s)	Penalties	Time (s)
1	(Republic of Ireland) Jessica Kürten	Libertina	0	-	0	34.25
2	(Germany) Meredith Michaels-Beerbaum	Shutterfly	0	-	0	35.01
3	(Germany) Ludger Beerbaum	All Inclusive NRW	0	-	0	37.06
4	(France) Julien Epaillard	Kanthaka de Petra	0	-	8	37.81
5	(United Kingdom) Tim Gredley	Omelli	4	72.69		

(Top 5 of 18 Competitors)
