= Rachel Wyse =

Irish sports presenter and equestrian (born 1985)

- Born: 22 January 1985 (age 41); Blackrock, Dublin
- Education: St. Andrew's College, Dublin
- Occupations: Journalist; News presenter; Newsreader
- Known for: Sky Sports & Sky Sports GAA
- Spouse: Tim Gredley (m. 2018)
- Children: 2

Rachel Wyse (born 22 January 1985) is an Irish journalist, presenter, former Sky Sports News anchor and equestrian show jumper.

== Early life ==
Wyse attended St Andrew's College, Dublin. She graduated from the Institute of Art, Design and Technology in Dún Laoghaire with a degree in Business Studies and Arts Management.

== Television career ==
Wyse eventually moved into television, producing and presenting her own entertainment and cultural programme on the City Channel.

She moved into sports presenting with the Show Jumping Ireland Premier Series in 2008 & 2009 on Sky Sports, Horse & Country TV and TG4, and was the face of Leinster Rugby's online television channel Leinster Rugby TV.

Wyse then became a co-presenter on Ireland's only domestic motoring showXccelerate on 3E.

In July 2010, Wyse was offered a contract with Sky Sports News and made her first appearance on the channel the same month. She worked full-time as a Sky Sports News Anchor. Wyse has filmed special reports with Olympic boxer Katie Taylor, Irish international rugby player Brian O'Driscoll and Manchester United player Juan Mata, as well as reporting from the London Olympics 2012 and Wimbledon.

In May 2014, Wyse was announced as a presenter of Sky Sports's new coverage of Gaelic games. Sky purchased the broadcasting rights for Championship football and hurling from the GAA.

Wyse parted company with Sky Sports in February 2021, after eleven years.

== Personal life ==
She became engaged to showjumper Tim Gredley on 5 February 2018. They were married on 12 January 2019 with a reception at Adare Manor in Co Limerick.

On 8 March 2020, Wyse announced she and her husband were expecting their first child. On 24 July 2020, she gave birth to a baby girl called Isabella. The couple welcomed their second child, a daughter named Charlotte in December 2021.

== Sports career ==
She competed internationally for Ireland as part of two European Show Jumping Championships teams and has competed on the Irish National circuit.

On St. Patrick's Day 2011, Wyse rode Silent Jo at Cheltenham in the charity race for Cancer Research UK. She raised more than £60,000 for the charity. She was invited to the House of Lords to receive recognition as one of Cancer Research UK's top fundraisers in 2011.

Wyse has a Saturday column in the Irish Independent, WYSE ON SPORT, which contains opinion pieces covering all sports.
