= Tim Gredley =

British equestrian (born 1986)

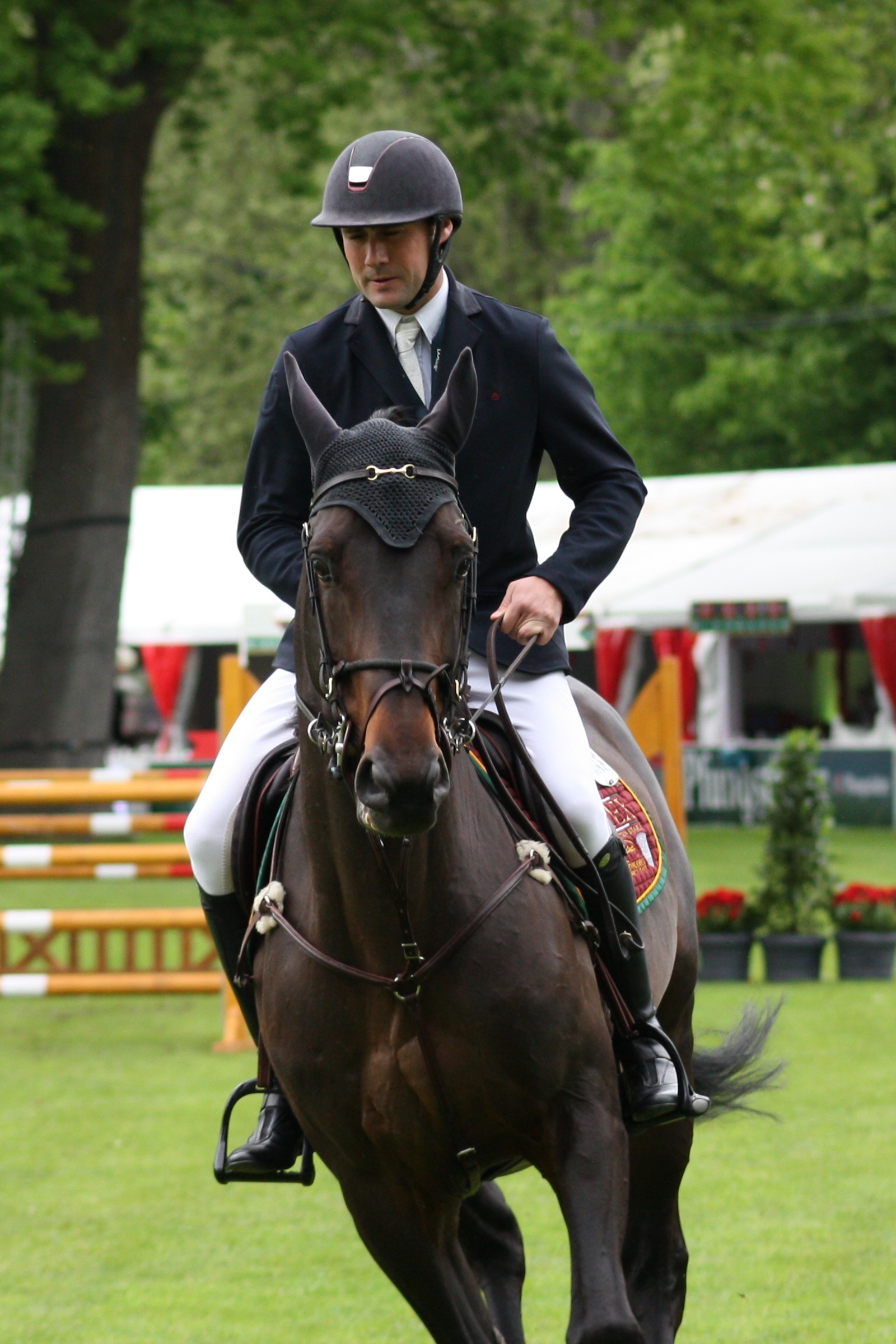
- Gredley on Unex Omega Star, 2013

Personal information
- Born: 12 January 1986 (age 40)
- Occupations: Jockey; Businessman
- Spouse: Rachel Wyse (m. 2018)
- Children: 2

Horse racing career
- Sport: Horse racing

Tim Gredley (born 12 January 1986) is a British equestrian who competes in the sport of show jumping.

== Career ==
He competed on Omelli at the 2006 World Equestrian Games. On Omelli he rode at the Dublin Horse Show in 2008 and the 2008 CN International, and 2008 Global Champions Tour.

He retired from riding in 2016 and concentrated on his business career as a developer and the family horse breeding business. His father Bill Gredley has owned several top class racehorses and the family have bred successful race horses, including 2017 Ascot Gold Cup winner Big Orange and Allmankind who with trainer Dan Skelton and his jockey brother Harry Skelton finished third in the Triumph Hurdle at the Cheltenham Festival and won the Grade One Henry VIII novices’ chase at Sandown Park and the Monet’s Garden Old Roan chase at Aintree.

He returned to competitive riding in 2019. He was a member of the British quartet that won the FEI Nations Cup on home soil at Hickstead in July 2023. He rode Medoc De Toxandria at the 2023 European Championships in Milan.

In May 2024, he was placed on the list of British showjumping Olympic entries for the 2024 Paris Games.

== Personal life ==
He became engaged to Irish journalist and television presenter Rachel Wyse on 5 February 2018. They pair married on 12 January 2019 with a reception at Adare Manor in Co Limerick. They live in Newmarket and have two children. His sister Polly is also a jockey.
