= Horse Sport Ireland =

Governing body for equestrian sports

- Sport: Equestrian sports
- Abbreviation: HSI
- Founded: 2008
- Affiliation: International Federation for Equestrian Sports; Sport Ireland; Olympic Federation of Ireland; Department of Agriculture; Sport Northern Ireland
- Regional affiliation: Ireland
- President: Michael Dowling

Official website
- horsesportireland.ie

Horse Sport Ireland (HSI) is the national governing body for all equestrian sport for Ireland. Established in 2008, it is responsible for the administration of international competitions throughout the island, including the Republic of Ireland and Northern Ireland. It sanctions Irish riders and horses competing abroad at international events, and implements the rules and regulations laid down by the FEI. It is recognised by FEI, Sport Ireland (previously called The Irish Sports Council), and the Olympic Federation of Ireland (previously Olympic Council of Ireland).

Horse Sport Ireland has over 20 affiliate organisations including breed societies, show associations, and all equestrian disciplines including the FEI-recognized disciplines of show jumping, eventing, dressage, endurance riding, para-equestrian and combined driving. Some of HSI's activities consist of maintaining the studbooks of the Irish Draught and Irish Sport Horse, issuing horse passports, and operating education programmes.
