= Lauren Hough =

American equestrian

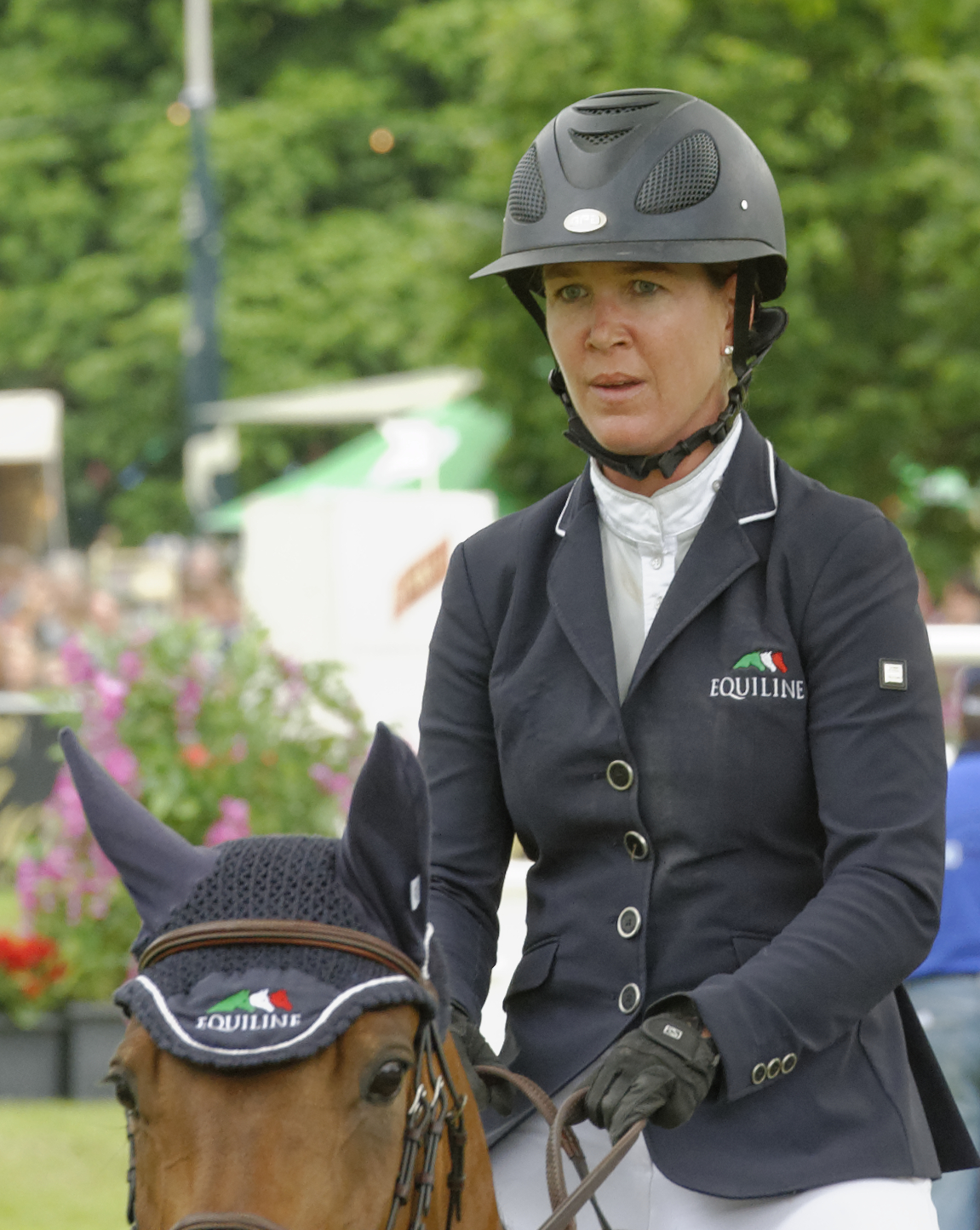
- Hough in 2013

Personal information
- Born: April 11, 1977 (age 49) Goshen, New York, United States

Sport
- Sport: Equestrian
Medal record
Representing United States
Women's equestrian
Pan American Games
Bronze medal – third place	2007 Rio de Janeiro	Team show jumping
Bronze medal – third place	2015 Toronto	Individual jumping
Bronze medal – third place	2015 Toronto	Team jumping

Lauren Hough (born April 11, 1977) is an American equestrian. She was born in Goshen, New York. She competed in team jumping at the 2000 Summer Olympics in Sydney.

== Personal life ==
Hough is the adopted daughter of equestrian Charles Hough Jr.

In May 2012, it was reported that Hough was in a relationship with Mark Phillips, the former husband of Princess Anne who had recently separated from his second wife Sandy Pflueger.
