= Jessica Kürten =

Irish equestrian

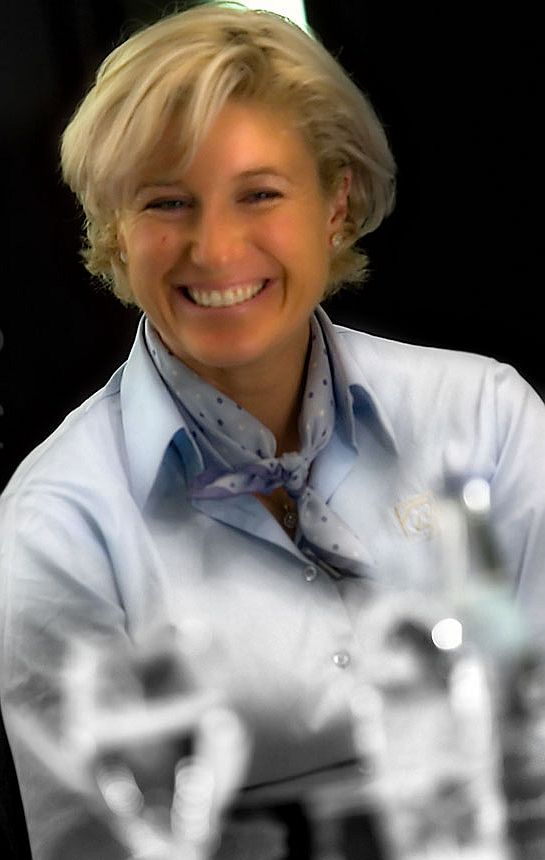

Personal information
- Full name: Jessica Kürten
- Nationality: British
- Discipline: Show jumping
- Born: 24 November 1969 (age 56); Cullybackey, Northern Ireland
- Height: 5 ft 6 in (1.68 m)
Medal record
Representing Ireland
Equestrian
European Championships
Gold medal – first place	2001 Arnhem	Team jumping

Jessica Kürten (born 24 November 1969) is a British equestrian from Northern Ireland who competes in the sport of show jumping, representing Ireland.

Born Jessica Chesney, Kürten won several national pony championships as a youth.

In 1994 Kürten married Eckard Kürten and moved to Hünxe in the German Rhineland. She has twice represented Ireland at the Olympic Games, 1996 Atlanta on Diamond's Exchange finishing 26th individually and team 8th and in 2004 Athens on Castle Forbes Maike finishing 18th individually.

== Rolex World ranking ==
Kurten had been the highest ranked Irish rider (apart from October 2009 (Ranking no. 106), and January 2010 (Ranking no. 109), where Denis Lynch held the title) until July 2010 (Ranking no. 116) when Denis Lynch took over.

She reached her highest ever World Ranking in April 2008 (No. 88) where she was the 2nd highest ranked rider in the world.

As of the end of December 2011, she is ranked 108th in the Rolex World Rankings – Irelands no. 7.

== Career ==
In 2006 Kürten was a judge on the BBC's Only Fools on Horses event.

=== Drugs controversy ===
In April 2007 she won the prestigious British Open Show Jumping Championships title at the NEC, Birmingham, UK. In 2007, Kürten's horse Castle Forbes Maike was found tested positive for etoricoxib, after a competition in La Baule in France. She then challenged the result. The judgement was upheld by the Court of Arbitration for Sport and Kürten was suspended for two months

=== Contract dispute with horse owners ===
The contract between Jessica and Lady Georgina Forbes was terminated by the latter on 31 December 2010. Lady Forbes owned many of Kürten's most successful horses including Quibell, Castle Forbes Libertina, Castle Forbes Cosma, and Castle Forbes Myrtille Paulois. A spokesman for Jessica said: "There are financial commitments which need to be cleared up between the owner and Kürten, as well as third parties. There are diverse details also for the German tax authorities which need to be sorted out due to the fact that Lady Georgina Forbes is Irish and lives in Switzerland." The spat was taken to another level, with a court rejecting an application for a temporary injunction to return the horses to Lady Forbes, so the horses remain in the Kürten's care in Germany while a solution to the matter is sought. At the beginning of March, Kürten stated that both parties "have different point of views how financial claims between themselves and in regard to third parties can be settled." The five horses were handed over on 20 April in the presence of lawyers and veterinarians, and €300,000 was posted by Lady Georgina Forbes as a guarantee against future claims by the Kürtens.

=== 2010 ===
In January 2010 she returned to Leipzig for the CSI5*-W Show. For the third year in a row – after Castle Forbes Libertina only just returning to competition – she won the World Cup Qualifier securing her place in the final in Geneva. Kürten had to reluctantly pull out of the FEI Rolex World Cup Final in Geneva after suffering a fall off a horse at home the weekend before. She was hospitalised on Friday the 9th and released over the weekend. This was a big blow as she was heading into the final as a leading contender as she was on top of the Leader Board.

Kuerten travelled to the CSI4* in Antwerp, Belgium in April. Here, she won the opening four star class – the BMW Masters with Fashion. She also 3rd in Saturdays 1m50 class with Castle Forbes Myrtille Paulois – just 0.25 seconds off the pace of European Champion Kevin Staut.

On the first weekend of May, she competed at the first leg of the Global Champions Tour in Valencia. Although Kuerten had no luck in the €285,000 Grand Prix on Saturday – she did capture the 1m50 class on the Sunday with Castle Forbes Cosma.

Kuerten then travelled to Hamburg for the second leg of the Global Champions Tour where she secured a decisive victory in the accumulator class. She won the class by nearly 14 seconds on Castle Forbes Myrtille Paulois.

Next was the third leg of the Global Champions Tour held in Turin, Italy. She secured 4th place in the Grand Prix with Castle Forbes Libertina bagging herself €25,000 and 33 Global Champions Tour points moving her up to 5th place on the tour rankings.

From the 10–12 July, Kuerten competed at the CSI5* Global Champions Tour of Cannes, France. She got off to a good start on the first day by winning the 1m50 jump-off class with Castle Forbes Libertina. The pair were over 1.5 seconds ahead of second place; Phillipe Rozier and Randgraaf. In the Grand Prix on Saturday, Kuerten and Castle Forbes Libertina finished third. The class was won by the Australian, Edwina Alexandra on Cevo Itot du Château with the only treble clear. The pair picked up €38,000 and gained 35 GCT points which left Kuerten in 3rd position after four legs of the Tour.

Kuerten continued to climb the Global Champions Tour leader board after a fantastic treble clear in the (Global Champions Tour) Grand Prix of Monte Carlo with Castle Forbes Libertina. The pair were pipped by the final rider (Bernardo Alves) by just 0.02 of a second. This second-place finish left her in 2nd place overall on the 2010 GCT Rankings after 5 legs.

Her Global Champions Tour campaign continued to the CSI5* Estoril, Portugal. On Day 1 (Friday), Kuerten had 4 faults on Castle Forbes Libertina in the 1m50 opening class. She then jumped API Largo in the 1m45 jump-off class that evening, but had 1 time fault in the first round. On Saturday, Kuerten jumped a double clear on API Largo in the 1m45 two phase class to finish 6th and earn €1,200. In the GCT Grand Prix that evening, she had the last fence down in the first round on Lady Georgina Forbes' Castle Forbes Libertina – this left Kuerten in 4th position in the GCT Rankings after the 6th leg.

Next, she travelled as part of the Irish squad to the CSIO5* in Falsterbo, Sweden. In the 7yo class on Day 1, Kuerten and Baco had 4 faults to finish 7th. In the 5th leg of the Meydan FEI Nations Cup, which was won by the home team, Ireland finished 5th on 24 faults: Dermott Lennon (Hallmark Elite) 4/12, Jessica Kuerten (Castle Forbes Myrtille Paulois) (8)/(12), Shane Breen (Carmena Z) 4/4, Denis Lynch (Nabab's Son) 0/0.

The CSI5* of San Patrignano, Italy was Kuerten's next stop. Here, Paddington 82 picked up 2 placings, a 7th and 8th in 7 year old classes. Castle Forbes Myrtille Paulois finished 3rd in the 1m45 speed class on Saturday, and API Largo took 8th place in the Accumulator class on Sunday.

At the penultimate leg of the Global Champions Tour at the CSI5* Valkensward, the Netherlands, Kuerten and Castle Forbes Myrtille Paulois finished 10th in the GCT 'VDL Groep' Grand Prix, keeping 4th in the overall GCT rankings.

She did not travel to Rio de Janeiro for the final leg of the GCT, so she dropped to 5th in the overall GCT rankings and earned €60,000 of the €1,000,000 bonus.

Kuerten travelled to the CSI3* Humlikon, Switzerland next. Here, she and API Largo jumped a double clear in the Grand Prix but completed a steady jump-off round with 1 time fault to finish 7th and collect €1,250.

CSI 5*-W 'Kingsland' Oslo Horse Show, Finland: Kuerten steered Castle Forbes Cosma to 9th place in the Rolex FEI World Cup qualifier to collect €1,000, and earn 8 points towards qualifying.

CSI5*-W Helsinki International Horse Show, Finland: In the Grand Prix qualifier on Day 1, Kürten steered Castle Forbes Cosma to 7th place and earned €1,000. On Day 2, she partnered API Largo to 4th place in the Grand Prix and collected €6,000. In the 'Equita Masters' on Saturday night, Kürten steered Lector 35 to 7th place to earm €6,000.

CSI5*-W Verona, Italy: On Saturday, she and Castle Forbes Cosma finished in 4th place in a 1m40 class to earn €2,000. In the Grand Prix, Kürten steered API Largo to 8th place and €2,000. On Sunday, she and Lector finished 6th in the 1m40 two-phase class to earn €1,500.

CSI5*-W Gucci Masters, Paris, France: On the opening evening – in the Rolex Speed Challenge – Kürten and the VDL Stud's VDL Harley took 6th prize of €2,100. The pair took a further €4,500 by finishing 7th in the €100,000 'Gucci by Gucci' challenge on Saturday evening.

CSI5* A Coruña, Spain: In the 1m45 speed class on Friday evening, Kürten took 4th and 5th prize totalling €3,600 with VDL Harley and Castle Forbes Cosma respectively. In the feature class that evening, the 1m50 jump-off class, she saw a return to winning form when she and Castle Forbes Myrtille Paulois took the top prize of €24,000. Her luck continued into the Grand Prix on Saturday where she again partnered Castle Forbes Myrtille Paulois to take second prize of €26,000. That evening, she and Castle Forbes Cosma took 3rd prize of €3,000 in the 1m45 class.

CSI5*-W Mechelen, Belgium: In the 1m50 class on Tuesday, Kürten and Castle Forbes Myrtille Paulois took 7th prize of €1,250. She and Castle Forbes Cosma then secured top-prize of €2,200 in the Queen's Cup that evening. Again, riding Castle Forbes Myrtille Paulois, Kürten took the top prize of a Land Rover and €13,000 in the feature class; the Rolex FEI World Cup Qualifier. Additionally, Castle Forbes Cosma finished second in the Last Chance jump-off class.

=== 2011 ===
CSI5*-W Vigo, Spain: In a 1m50 speed class on day 1, Kürten and API Largo took 6th prize of €2,200. On Saturday, she and Lektor earned €2,100 by finishing 5th in another 1m50 speed class.

CSI5* Global Champions Tour Doha, Qatar: VDL Harley had 4 faults in the 1m50 jump-off on Friday to settle for 12th position and €1,500.

CSI3* San Giovani, Italy: Kürten and Lektor finished 3rd in a 1m50 class to earn €3,450.

CSIO5* St. Gallen, Switzerland: Kürten and Lektor took 5th prize of 22,000CHF (€18,000) in the Longines Grand Prix

CSI4* De Steeg, the Netherlands: VDL Harley won a 1m50 jump-off class worth €5,750 to the winner.

World Breeding Championships, Lanaken, Belgium: Jessica and Cor de la Rossa Z won the 7 year old final earning €5,000.

CSI4* A Coruña, Spain: Harley VDL and Kurten had a productive show by winning a 1m45 class, taking €7,350 in prize-money. They also took 3rd prize of €2,990, and 6th prize of €1,380 in two other 1m45 classes.

CSI2* Sainte Cecile, France: Harley VDL earned €4,370 by finishing second in the Grand Prix.

CSI3* San Giovanni, Italy: Kurten and Vincente finished 6th in the 1m50 Grand Prix.

CSI3* Kiel, Germany: Vincente took 3rd prize of €5,600 in the Grand Prix. The pair also took 5th place (worth €1,400) in the 1.50 Grand Prix qualifier on Saturday.

CSI5*-W Geneva, Switzerland: In the 1m55 Grand Prix on Friday night, API Largo finished 6th to earn 5,000CHF (€4,000).

CSI5* A Coruña, Spain: Vincente jumped 0/4 in the 1m55 Grand Prix to take 6th prize of €4,250.

CSI5*-W Mechelen, Belgium: Kurten and API Largo earned 2nd prize of €5,000 in a 1m45 two-phase class behind fellow countryman, Denis Lynch.

=== 2012 ===
CSI4* Amsterdam, the Netherlands: Kürten finally returned to the winners circle at Grand Prix level when Vincente took first prize (by just 0.03 second) of €24,750 in the Grand Prix.

CSI5*-W Zurich, Switzerland: Vincente had 4 faults in the 'Mercedes Benz' Rolex FEI World Cup and finished 12th to earn €1,660 (2,000CHF).

CSI2* Valencia, Spain: API Largo finished equal-third in a 1m45 two-phase to earn €2875.

CSI5* Paris, France: Kürten and API Largo joined Marcus Ehning and Copin van de Broy in the pairs competition where they finished 3rd earning €5,000. Vincente picked up a further €3,450 for 3rd place in a 1m45-1m50 competition.

CSI4* Antwerp, Belgium: API Largo finished equal-third to earn €1,775 in the six-bar.

CSI3* Ebreichsdorf, Austria: Voss jumped double-clear in the Grand Prix to take the top prize of a car.

CSI5* Madrid, Spain: Voss picked up €1,350 for 6th place in a 1m50.

== Horses ==
Diamond Exchange Gelding / Bay / 1983 / Diamond Serpent

Winner of the Grand Prix of Helsinki (1996) and Mechelen (1995). The pair were also members of two victorious Nations Cup teams in 1994 in La Baule and Modena. At the World Championships in 1994, he finished 10th individually, and the Olympic Game of 1996, the pair finished 27th individually.

Paavo N Gelding / Bay / 1986 / Polydor x Goldstern

Placed in Nations Cups and Grand Prix all over the world. At the European Championships in 1999, Paavo N took the 'Horse of the Show' award.

Bonita 38 Mare / Grey / 1989 / Bal Pare x Goldcup

Winner of International classes across the world, including the Aegon Masters Final in Monte Carlo, 2001.

Quibell Mare / Bay / 1994 / Quidam de Revel – owned by Lady Georgina Forbes

She won the $750,000 Dubai Grand Prix in 2006, along with the Grand Prix of Chernyakovsk, Russia. She also won the Gothenburg Graqnd Prix in 2008. In 2006, the pair won the opening round of the 2006 World Cup.

Castle Forbes Libertina Mare / Bay / 1996 / Libero H x Polydor – owned by Lady Georgina Forbes

Winner of nine 5* Grand Prix – 2007: Monaco, and the World Cup qualifier at London Olympia; 2008: Dublin, São Paulo, and the World Cup qualifier at Leipzig; 2009: The World Cup qualifiers at Zurich and Leipzig; 2010: the World Cup qualifiers at Gothenburg and Leipzig. The pair also took victory in the 2007 Rolex Top Ten Final in Geneva. At the 2006 World Cup final in Kuala Lumpur, they came within a single fault of first place to finish 2nd.

Castle Forbes Myrtille Paulois Mare / Bay / 2000 / Dolar Du Murier x Grand Verneur – owned by Lady Georgina Forbes

Winner of the Rolex FEI World Cup Qualifier at the 5* Mechelen, Belgium in 2010

== Career statistics ==
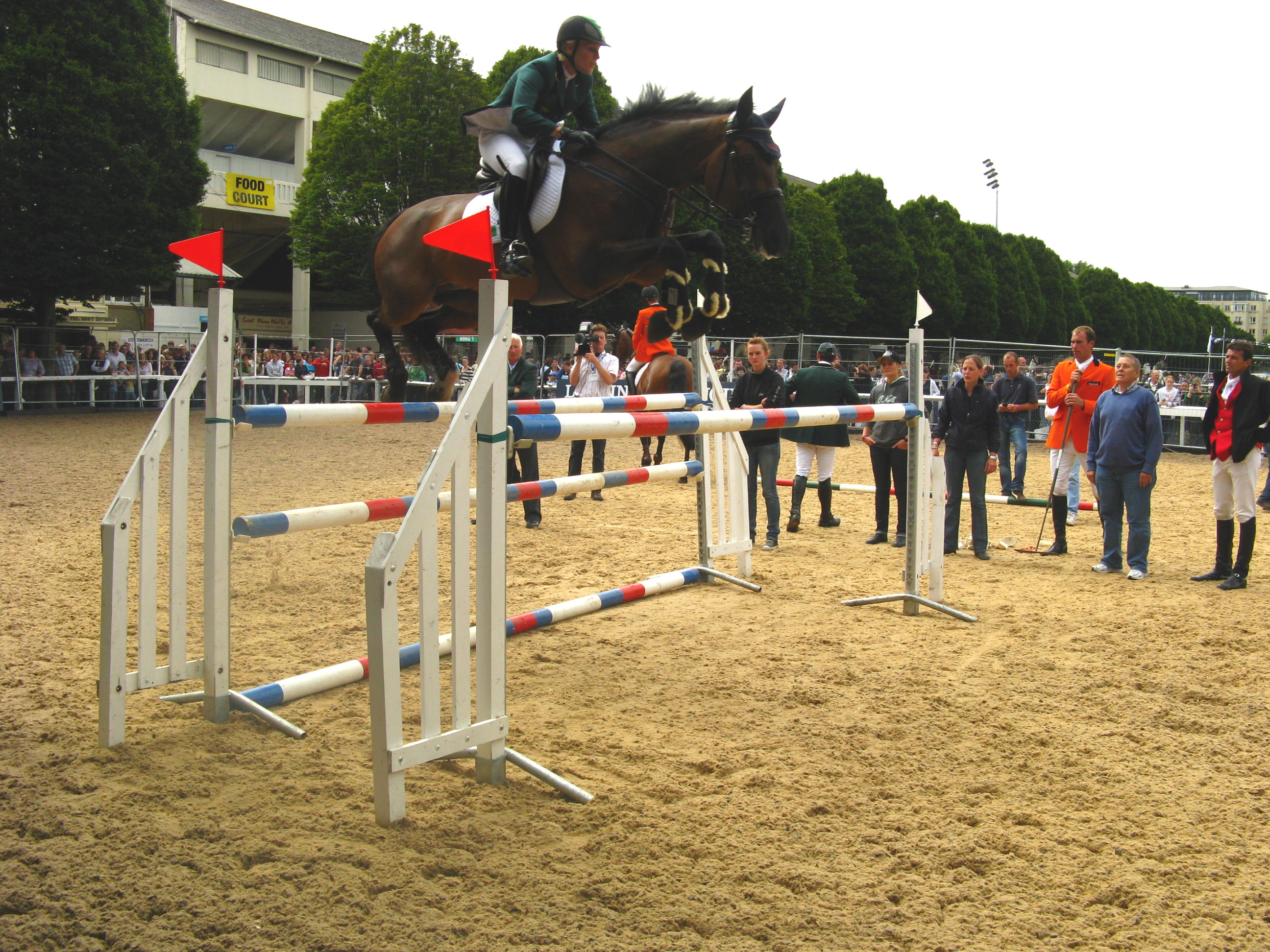
Warming up for the Dublin Horse Show Samsung Aga Khan Nations Cup 5* Superleague

=== Results ===
- 2013
- 2012
  - 1st, Grand Prix, CSI4* Ebreichsdorf, Austria (Voss)
  - 1st, Grand Prix, CSI4* Amsterdam, the Netherlands (Vincente)
- 2011
  - 3rd, Grand Prix, CSI3* Kiel, Germany (Vincente)
- 2010
  - Rolex FEI World Cup Qualifier, CSI5*-W, Mechelen, Belgium (Castle Forbes Myrtille Paulois)
  - 2nd, Grand Prix, CSI5* A Coruña, Spain (Castle Forbes Myrtille Paulois)
  - 2nd, Grand Prix, CSI5* GCT Mote Carlo, Monaco (Castle Forbes Libertina)
  - 3rd, Grand Prix, CSI5* GCT Cannes, France (Castle Forbes Libertina)
  - Rolex FEI World Cup Qualifier, CSI5*-W Gothenburg, Sweden, (Castle Forbes Libertina)
  - 2nd, Rolex FEI World Cup Qualifier, CSI5*-W 's-Hertogenbosch, (Castle Forbes Libertina)
  - Rolex FEI World Cup Qualifier, CSI5*-W Leipzig, Germany, (Castle Forbes Libertina)
- 2009
  - 2nd, Rolex FEI World Cup Qualifier, CSI5*-W Mechelen, (Castle Forbes Libertina)
  - Grand Prix, CSI4* Moorsele, Belgium, (Castle Forbes Vivaldo vh Costersveld)
  - Grand Prix, CSIO4* Barcelona, Spain, (Castle Forbes Cosma)
  - 2nd, Grand Prix, CSI3* Humlikon, Switzerland, (Castle Forbes Cosma)
  - 2nd, Grand Prix, CSI3* Arezzo, Italy, (Quibell)
  - Rolex FEI World Cup Qualifier, CSI5*-W Zurich, Switzerland, (Castle Forbes Libertina)
  - Rolex FEI World Cup Qualifier, CSI5*-W Leipzig, Germany, (Castle Forbes Libertina)
- 2008
  - Grand Prix, CSI5* São Paulo, Brazil, (Castle Forbes Libertina)
  - Grand Prix, CSIO5* Dublin, Ireland, (Castle Forbes Libertina)
  - Grand Prix Pescanova, CSI4* Gijón, (Castle Forbes Libertina)
  - 2nd, Grand Prix Telefónica, CSI4* A Coruña, (Castle Forbes Libertina)
  - Equal 4th, Rolex FEI World Cup Final, Gothenburg, (Castle Forbes Libertina)
  - Rolex FEI World Cup Final, Gothenburg Trophy, Gothenburg, (Quibell)
  - Rolex FEI World Cup Final, Competition II, Gothenburg, (Castle Forbes Libertina)
  - Rolex FEI World Cup Qualifier (Grand Prix of Leipzig), CSI5*-W Leipzig, Germany, (Castle Forbes Libertina)
- 2007
  - Rolex FEI World Cup Qualifier, CSI-W Olympia, London, (Castle Forbes Libertina)
  - NH Hoteles Trophy, CSI5* A Coruña, (Kalande des Grez)
  - Rolex Top Ten Final, CSI5* Geneva, (Castle Forbes Libertina)
  - Equal 2nd, Rolex Grand Prix, CSI5* Geneva, (Castle Forbes Libertina)
  - Prix Clarins, CSI5* Geneva, (Castle Forbes Vivaldo vh Costersveld)
  - Speed Class, CSI4*-W Verona, (Castle Forbes Libertina)
  - British Open Champion, CSI4* NEC, Birmingham (Galopin de Bioley)
  - Monaco Grand Prix, CSI5* Monaco, (Castle Forbes Libertina)
  - 2nd, Grand Prix de Cannes, CSI5* Cannes, (Castle Forbes Libertina)
  - Longines Grand Prix, CSIO5* La Baule (Castle Forbes Maike)
  - OBO Bettermann Prize, CSI3* Balve, Germany (Castle Forbes Libertina)
  - Preis der AachenMunchener, CSIO5* Aachen (Quibell)
  - Coruna City Council Grand Prix, CSI4* A Coruña, Spain (Quibell)
- 2006
  - Dubai Grand Prix (Quibell)
  - Dubai Masters (Castle Forbes Libertina)
  - Credit Suisse Grand Prix, Zürich (Quibell)
  - Mercedes Swiss Masters (winning a car), Zürich (Castle Forbes Libertina)
  - Chernyakhovsk Grand Prix, Russia (Quibell)
  - 2nd, Rolex World Cup Final, Kuala Lumpur, (Castle Forbes Libertina)
  - Worldcup pre-Qualifier Competition, Leipzig
  - Qualifier young horses, Leipzig
  - Final young horses, Leipzig
  - Qualifier Worldcup Competition Göteborg
  - Göteborg Trophy, Gothenburg
  - Intern. jumping class CSI Cannes
- 2005
  - Estoril Grand Prix, Portugal (Castle Forbes Maike)
  - The knock out, Kiel (Laurus)
- 2004
  - Team Trophy, Leipzig (Lady Preishammer)
  - Berlin World Cup Qualifier
  - Nations Cup: Dublin (Quibell)
  - 18th, Athens Olympics Individual Show Jumping
- 2003
  - Ladies German Masters, Stuttgart (Quibell)
  - Accumulator, National Show Nürnberg, Germany
  - Queens Cup, Mechelen (Paavo N)
- 2002
  - Indoor-Derby, Vienna (Lady Preishammer)
- 2001
  - Team Gold medal European Championships, Arnhem, Netherlands (Bonita 38)
  - Aegon MoneyMaxx Masters Final, (winning a car), Monte Carlo (Bonita 38)
  - Nations Cups: Calgary and Lummen (Bonita 38)
- 2000
  - Nations Cups: Calgary and Rotterdam, Dublin, San Marino & Modena – helping to win a record-breaking tenth Nations Cup, thus clinching Ireland's place as outright winner of the Samsung Nations Cup Series 1999/2000 (all Paavo N)
- 1999
  - Queen Elizabeth II Cup, Hickstead (Paavo N)
- 1996
  - Helsinki Grand Prix (Diamond Exchange)
- 1995
  - Mechelen Grand Prix (Diamond Exchange)
- 1994
  - World Championships, WEG The Hague, 10th individually (Diamond Exchange)
  - Nations Cups: La Baule and Modena (Diamond Exchange)
- 1992
  - Millstreet World Cup Qualifier (Diamond Exchange)
