= Cian O'Connor =

Irish equestrian

Personal information
- Nationality: Ireland
- Discipline: Show jumping
- Born: 12 November 1979 (age 47); Dublin, Ireland
- Height: 176 cm (5 ft 9 in)
- Weight: 74 kg (163 lb)

Website
- cianoconnor.com
Medal record
Olympic Games
Bronze medal – third place	2012 London	Individual jumping
European Championships
Gold medal – first place	2017 Gothenburg	Team jumping
Bronze medal – third place	2017 Gothenburg	Individual jumping

Cian O'Connor (born 12 November 1979) is an Irish equestrian who competes in show jumping. He has competed at four Olympic Games, five World Equestrian Championships and six European Championships. O'Connor has made more than 150 appearances for Ireland, with Horse Sport Ireland marking his 150th appearance in 2024.

O'Connor was a member of the Irish teams that won the Aga Khan Trophy at the Dublin Horse Show in 2004, 2012, 2015 and 2022. At the 2017 FEI European Championships, he was a member of the Irish team that won the team jumping gold medal and also won the individual bronze medal.

At the 2012 Summer Olympics in London, O'Connor won the individual bronze medal riding Blue Loyd. He returned to the Olympics at Tokyo 2020, held in 2021, riding Kilkenny, and competed at the 2024 Summer Olympics in Paris with Maurice.

In 2026, O'Connor was part of the Irish team at the World Championships in Aachen, where Ireland secured qualification for the 2028 Summer Olympics in Los Angeles.

== Recent results ==
Year	Place	Horse	Event	Rating	Show	Location
2025	1st	Bentley de Sury	World Cup Win	CSI5*	Longines FEI World Cup	Ocala, Florida
2025	Part of Irish Winning Nations Cup Team	Bentley de Sury	Nations Cup	CSI05*	Nations Cup	La Baule, France
2026	1st	Genghis Khan	1.55m	CSI5*	1.55m	Hamburg, Germany
2026	1st	Genghis Khan	1.50m	CSI5*	1.50m	La Baule, France

== Early life ==
O'Connor was born on 12 November 1979 in Dublin, Ireland. He spent parts of his childhood in County Wicklow, County Kildare and the United States, and attended Christian Brothers School in Naas and Belvedere College in Dublin.

He began horse riding at the age of 14, initially riding Radiman, a chestnut gelding owned by his father, Tadhg O'Connor. He developed an interest in competitive show jumping through hunter trial competitions and received early guidance from riding instructor John Floody in Bettystown, County Meath.

O'Connor made his international debut representing Ireland at the age of 17 in Dunkirk, France.

== Olympic Games ==
=== 2004 Summer Olympics ===
Riding Waterford Crystal, O'Connor initially placed first in the individual jumping competition at the 2004 Summer Olympics in Athens. Waterford Crystal subsequently tested positive for prohibited substances and O'Connor was stripped of the gold medal. He also received a three-month suspension from competition.

The Fédération Équestre Internationale (FEI) found that O'Connor had not been involved in a deliberate attempt to affect the performance of the horse. The gold medal was subsequently awarded to Brazil's Rodrigo Pessoa.

=== 2012 Summer Olympics ===
O'Connor represented Ireland at the 2012 Summer Olympics in London, riding Blue Loyd. After initially being named first reserve for the individual final, he gained a place following the withdrawal of Sweden's Rolf-Göran Bengtsson and Casall.

Blue Loyd completed both rounds of the final without jumping faults. O'Connor incurred a single time penalty after finishing the second round 0.02 seconds over the permitted time, leaving him tied with the Netherlands' Gerco Schröder and requiring a jump-off for the silver medal.

In the jump-off, Blue Loyd knocked the final fence, leaving O'Connor with four faults and the bronze medal. It was O'Connor's first Olympic medal.

=== 2020 Summer Olympics ===
O'Connor represented Ireland at the 2020 Summer Olympics in Tokyo, which were held in 2021, riding Kilkenny. The combination finished seventh in the individual competition.

Kilkenny developed a nosebleed during the individual final, and O'Connor subsequently withdrew the horse from the team competition.

=== 2024 Summer Olympics ===
O'Connor represented Ireland at the 2024 Summer Olympics in Paris, riding Maurice. He competed in both the individual and team jumping competitions.

O'Connor finished 33rd in the individual qualifying round and did not qualify for the individual final. Ireland finished seventh in the team competition.

== Karlswood ==
O'Connor is based at Karlswood, an equestrian training facility near Batterstown, County Meath. He developed the facility as a base for training and producing show jumping horses and riders.

The facility includes indoor, outdoor and grass arenas and facilities for equine fitness, rehabilitation and preparation for international competition.
