= Denis Lynch =

Irish show jumper (born 1976)

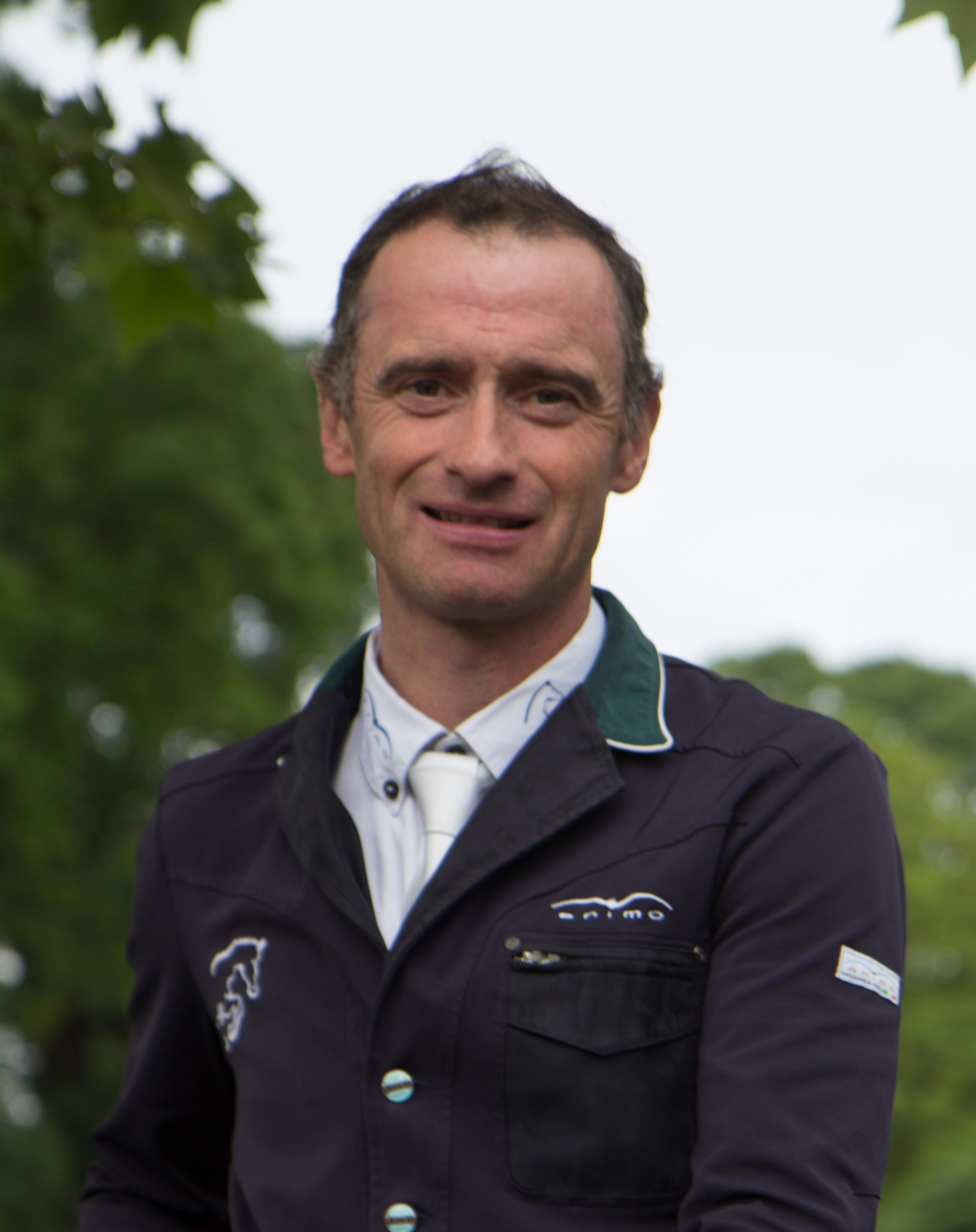

Personal information
- Full name: Denis Lynch
- Discipline: Show jumping
- Born: 3 May 1976 (age 49); Tipperary, Ireland
Medal record
Equestrian
Representing Ireland
European Championships
Gold medal – first place	2017 Gothenburg	Team jumping

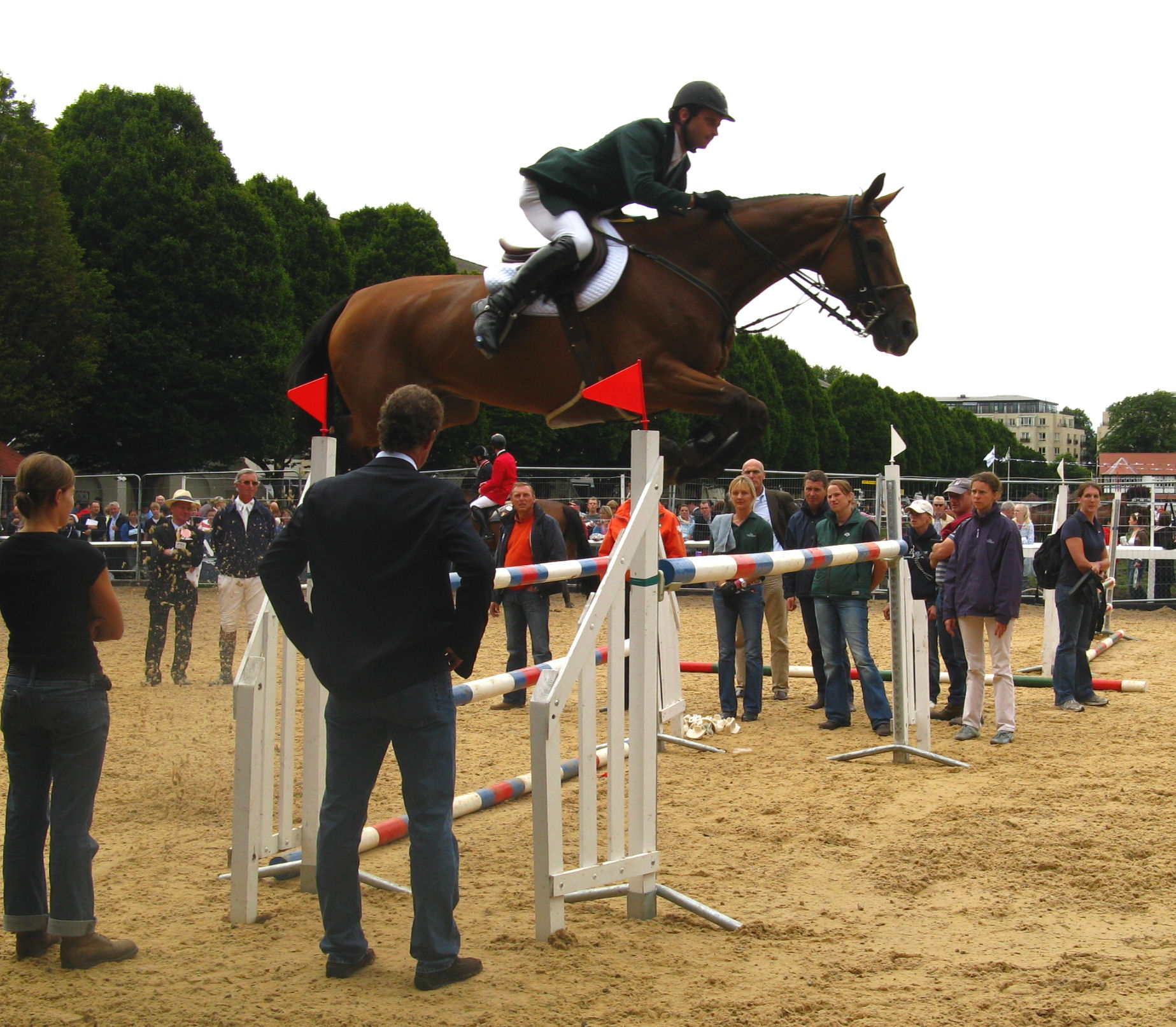
Nabab's Son, Dublin 2008

Denis Lynch (born 3 May 1976) is an Irish show jumper.

He represented Ireland at the 2008 Summer Olympics in Beijing. Early on 21 August it emerged that he had withdrawn from the equestrian individual final which was due to have been held later that day. It was later confirmed that Lynch was banned from entering the show jumping final due to his horse, Lantinus, being found to have been in contact with illegal substances. Latinus was found to have capsaicin in his system due to the use of a cream similar to Deep-heat called Equiblock. Lynch had been using the banned substance for some time but maintained that he did not know it was illegal. He described himself as "shattered" due to missing out on his chance for an Olympic medal. Lantinus was one of four horses banned on doping offences; the others were from Brazil, Germany and Norway. Lantinus and Lynch had been described prior to the scandal as "Ireland's best chance of an Olympic medal in Beijing".

== Rolex World ranking ==
Lynch took over the position of highest ranked Irish rider in the October 2009 (ranking no. 106) World Rankings where he held 17th position. The following month, Jessica Kurten regained this title. He again took this title in January 2010 (No. 109) when he was again ranked 17th in the World, but this also only lasted a month. In the August 2010 (no. 116) World Rankings, Lynch reached 6th position and re-became the highest ranked Irish rider. He held this title for 4 months until it was taken over by Billy Twomey in December 2010 (No. 120). In April 2011, Lynch reached his highest ever World Ranking of 4th.

As of the end of March 2012, he is ranked 16th in the Rolex World Rankings – Ireland's no. 1.

== Horses ==
- Lancelot 200: Gelding / Dark Bay / 1997 / Lancer III x Argentinus

He and Lynch jumped many double clears in Nations Cups and Grand Prix but was slow against the clock. They were also a member of the winning Irish team at the 'Samsung Super League' of Falsterbo, Sweden, 2006.

- Lantinus: Gelding / Bay / 1998 / Lankoenig x Argentinus – owned by Thomas Straumann

Winner of 5 International Grand Prix, including four 5* – Doha, La Baule, Rome (2008), Aachen (2009). The pair have also been a member of two winning Irish Nations Cup teams – Falsterbo (2009), Aachen (2010). Lantinus also topped the WBFSH World Breeding Rankings of 2008.

- Nabab's Son: Gelding / Bay / 1998 / Nabab de Reve x Kebah – owned by Thomas Straumann

A member of many 5* Nations Cup teams – in 2010, the pair recorded at least one clear round in each of the 3 teams they were selected including jumping double clear at Falsterbo, Sweden. He has also been placed in many International classes across the world, including finishing 3rd in the 5* Grand Prix of London Olympia, 2008.

- Abbervail van het Dingeshof: Gelding / Bay / 2000 / Nonstop x Jus de Pomme – owned by Thomas Straumann

Has been placed in many International Grand Prix, including winning the 5* Rolex FEI World Cup in s'Hertogenbosch 2011, and the 4* Grand Prix in Weisbaden in 2010. The pair also jumped a double clear in the Nations Cup of Lummen, Belgium, 2010 to help Ireland to victory.

- All Inclusive NRW: Gelding / Bay / 1999 / Arpeggio x Phantom – owned by Thomas Straumann

Placed in many international Grand Prix, including being placed 2nd in two 5* at Paris, France (2009) and Rio de Janeiro, Brazil (2010), and winning the 3* at Leipzig in 2011.

== 2008 scandal ==
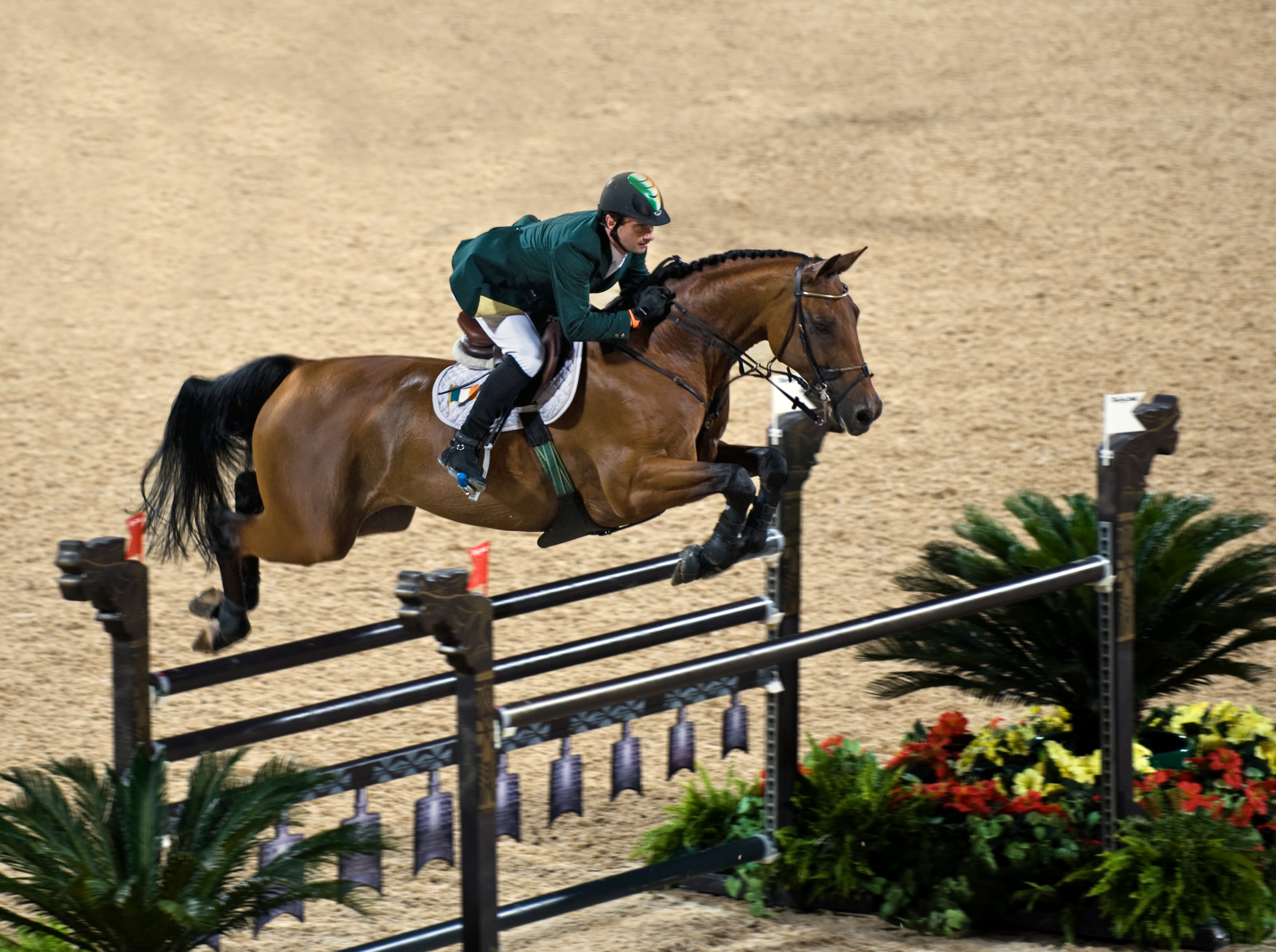
Lynch riding at the 2008 Olympic Games

Build-up

Denis Lynch had qualified for the final on Thursday 21 August by posting his worst result of the equestrian event the previous Monday. He recorded six penalty points in his third outing of the competition. Four of the points had been for jumping errors, whilst two came about due to him exceeding the 88 second time limit. Lynch had had only two points going into the Monday's event.

Aftermath

In the hours that followed the revelations, Horse Sport Ireland made a statement on Lynch's Olympic disqualification, saying it was "informed by the world equestrian governing body, the FEI, at 2.15pm Hong Kong time on Thursday (21 August), that Irish Olympic rider Denis Lynch's horse, Lantinus had tested positive for a banned substance and that as a result he would be suspended from taking part in tonight's show jumping final." A urine sample from the horse's bladder was subjected to a voluntary screening testing process made available by the FEI on the horse's arrival in Hong Kong, the results of which proved negative.

The head of the Irish Olympic team, Dermot Henihan, refused to speak to Lynch, calling it "a bitter pill to swallow". The row escalated after the President of the Olympic Council of Ireland threatened to ban the equestrian team from participating in future Olympic Games. In an interview with the Irish Independent Pat Hickey accused the show-jumping industry of dragging Irish sport "through the mud" and said the embarrassment caused by Lynch could have "very serious repercussions for the entire equine industry in our country". Damien McDonald, the chief executive of Horse Sport Ireland, called it a "nightmare" and expressed his disappointment at Hickey for commenting publicly instead of first meeting with him in Ireland. He says he believes show-jumping could be removed from the Olympics altogether, with the International Olympic Committee scheduled to meet in Copenhagen in October to consider applications from five new sports to be included in future Olympic Games.

Political reaction

Minister for Arts, Sport and Tourism Martin Cullen, who had been expected to fly from Beijing to Hong Kong if Lynch and Lantinus had won a medal in the final, was said to be "staying silent" as the controversy unfolded. The sports spokesperson for Fine Gael, Ireland's opposition party, Olivia Mitchell called it an understatement to say it was disappointing because "we knew we (Ireland) were going to be in the spotlight". She said there was no other option other than for it to have been an act of cheating or "incredible stupidity" and called for "swift condemnation and appropriate sanctions" to be handed out to Lynch. Mitchell did not accept Lynch's excuse of ignorance saying that "it is well known that capsaicin is a banned substance". She said the scandal would lead to "dismay among the public".

Perspective

Doubt has been cast on the future of equestrianism as part of the Olympics. The doping scandal follows previous incidents at past Olympics, most notably the Cian O'Connor incident at Athens in 2004. O'Connor won an individual showjumping gold medal with his horse Waterford Crystal but was later stripped of it because of drug offences. Also in Athens, a doping scandal cost team Germany a jumping gold after the horse ridden by Ludger Beerbaum was disqualified when it tested positive for drugs. World number one, Meredith Michaels-Beerbaum, was left off the German team for Athens after her horse tested positive, though she was later cleared.

== 2010 ==
Towards the end of April, Lynch was selected as part of Ireland's Nations Cup Team in Lummen, Belgium. He was selected as first to jump (with Abberuail van het Dingeshof) followed by Alex Duffy (Tampa), Shane Breen (Carmena Z), and Billy Twomey (Tinka's Serenade). In the first round they all jumped clear apart from Alex Duffy, who had 22 faults. As Duffy had the discarded score, he did not jump in the second round. The remaining trio then produced 3 more clear rounds to tie for first place with Australia on zero penalties. The jump-off saw Chris Chugg of Australia go head-to-head with Billy Twomey. With Chugg having four faults and Twomey jumping his third clear round of the competition, Ireland won. Lynch also achieved good placings on his new ride – Lacroix 9. He directed the 15-year-old gelding to 3rd place in the CSI2* Grand Prix, and 2nd in a CSI2* Table A class.

The opening leg of the Global Champions Tour in Valencia: Although many of the world's best riders – including Lynch – had faults in the €285,000 Grand Prix on Saturday, he was narrowly beaten into second in the 1m50 'Trophy Massimo Dutti'. The class was won by fellow Irish rider – Jessica Kuerten – just 0.32 seconds in front.

At the Global Champions Tour in Hamburg, Lynch (with Nabab's Son) won the 'Mercedes-Benz Championat of Hamburg' – the 1m55 qualification class for the Global Champions Tour of Germany Grand Prix.

Lynch took the top spot in the Grand Prix qualifier at the CSI4* Weisbaden, Germany, with Abberuail van het Dingeshof. He had been competing at the Global Champions Tour of Italy on the Saturday and travelled 600 km to win the class (and €7,500) in Weisbaden on the Sunday. Lynch then made his long trip very worthwhile by also taking the winners purse of €23,000 in the Grand Prix, again with Abberuail van het Dingeshof. He beat the recently crowned World Cup Champion (Marcus Ehning on Noltes Kuchengirl) into second place by just 0.08 of a second.

Lynch then travelled to the CSI3* Norten-Hardenberg, Germany. He and Lacroix won the 1m50 'Championat von Nörten-Hardenberg', Lynch also finished 5th on Nabab's Son in the 1m50 'Gothaer Trophy'.

He continued to chase the DKB Riders Tour shows, as he travelled to the CSI4* Balve. It was another worthwhile trip for Lynch as he finished second in the Grand Prix on his Olympic ride – Lantinus – putting him 18 points ahead of second place in the DKB Riders Tour standings at the half-way mark of the tour. Lynch also enjoyed the Medium Tour of the show, finishing 3rd in both the Grand Prix qualifier, and the Grand Prix with Abberuail van het Dingeshof

The fourth leg of the Global Champions Tour in Cannes, France was next for Lynch. On day 3, he was 0.09 seconds off the pace in the Table A 1m50 class with Lacroix.

For the final weekend of June, Lynch travelled to the CSI5* Global Champions Tour of Monte Carlo. He got off to a good start with Lacroix by taking top-spot in Thursdays 1m45 speed class, and receiving €6,400 in prize money. Lacroix continued his great form by finishing 8th in the Grand Prix with just four faults over the two rounds.

The sixth leg of the Global champions Tour was next for Lynch – the CSI5* Estoril, Portugal. On the opening evening, he jumped a double clear on Abberuail van het Dingeshof to secure 5th place and €1,750 in the 1m45 jump-off class – The 'Trophy Massimo Dutti'. He again chose to ride Abberuail van het Dingeshof in Saturday's GCT Grand Prix but were unlucky to have the final fence down in the first round.

Lynch travelled as part of the Irish squad to the CSIO5* Falsterbo, Sweden. In the opening competition – a 7-year-old class – he steered All Star 5 to 4th place. In the 5th leg of the Meydan FEI Nations Cup, which was won by the home team, Ireland finished 5th on 24 faults: Dermott Lennon (Hallmark Elite) 4/12, Jessica Kuerten (Castle Forbes Myrtille Paulois) (8)/(12), Shane Breen (Carmena Z) 4/4, Denis Lynch (Nabab's Son) 0/0. He then went on to win the 'Six-Bar' competition on Saturday evening with the 7-y-o All Star 5.

Next for Lynch was the World Equestrian Festival at the CSIO5* Aachen, Germany as part of the Irish team. On Day 2, he directed All Inclusive NRW to 3rd place in a jump-off class with a double clear to earn €3,000. In the 6th leg of the Meydan FEI Nations Cup on Thursday, the Irish team finished on a 4 fault score to win: Billy Twomey ( Tinka's Serenade) 4/0; Dermott Lennon (Hallmark Elite) 0/0; Cian O'Connor (K Club Lady) 0/0; Denis Lynch (Lantinus) (4)/(NS). On Sunday – although he failed to recapture the Grand Prix crown – he steered All Inclusive NRW to 4th place in the one round class.

In between Meydan Nations Cup duty, Lynch travelled to the 7th leg of the Global Champions Tour at Chantilly, France. On Saturday, he and All Inclusive NRW finished 3rd in the 1m50 Table C class to take €2,250.

Lynch was once again selected as part of the Irish Team – this time at the Royal International Horse Show at Hickstead, Great Britain. Although he did not have the most successful week, he helped the Irish Team secure their future in the Meydan FEI Nations Cup for another year by earning 3 points by finishing 6th in the Nations Cup on Friday, which was won by the host nation; Shane Breen (Carmena Z) 12/9; Dermott Lennon (Hallmark Elite) 9/(EL); Billy Twomey (Je t'Aime Flamenco) 5/1; Denis Lynch (Nabab's Son) 12/0.

The final leg of the Meydan FEI Nations Cup Series at the 'Failte Ireland' RDS Dublin Horse Show, Ireland, was next for Lynch. In the Nations Cup on Friday, Ireland finished joint 2nd on 20 faults with the USA: Billy Twomey (Tinka's Serenade) 0/4; Dermott Lennon (Hallmark Elite) (12)/(8); Cian O'Connor (K Club Lady) 8/0; Denis Lynch (Nabab's Son) 8/0. This result secured Ireland 4th place in the overall standings. On Saturday, he and Upsilon D'Ocquier finished 3rd in the Accumulator and received over €2,000. A double clear in the Longines Grand Prix on Sunday, earned Lynch and Nabab's Son 6th place and €11,500.

It seemed to 'all come together' for Lynch at the penultimate leg of the Global Champions Tour held at Stal Tops, Valkensward, The Netherlands where he picked up nearly €70,000 in prize money. On Saturday morning, he earned 3rd place (and €2,400) in the 1m45 one-round class with All Inclusive NRW. In the Global Champions Tour 'VDL Groep' Grand Prix of that evening, Lynch and Lantinus finished 2nd of 49 starters. He picked up €57,000 and climbed to 25th in the overall GCT ranking. On Sunday, he collected a further €1,400 by directing Tarpan to 2nd place in a CSI2* 1m40 jump-off class. Lynch's good fortune continued as he won the final of the CSI5* Medium Tour (a 1m50 jump-off class) with All Inclusive NRW and pocketed another €8,000.

At the final leg of the Global Champions Tour at the CSI5* Rio de Janeiro, Lynch and All Inclusive NRW finished 2nd in the Grand Prix and collected €70,000, being beaten by the 2010 World Cup Champion – Marcus Ehning (on Noltes Kuchengirl) by just 0.27 of a second. This result also brought him into the top 18 on the GCT standings where a €1,000,000 bonus was offered – Lynch earned €7,500 of the impressive bonus. During the show, he also partnered Lacroix 9 to 3rd in the Accumulator Class, and 5th in a 1m45 speed class, collecting €4,400 between them.

CSI4* Paderborn, Germany – the 4th leg of the DKB Riders Tour: In the Grand Prix qualifier on Saturday, Lynch and Abberuail van het Dingeshof pulled off the fastest time in the jump-off but had 4 faults to finish 9th. On Friday evening, he and Lacroix stopped the clock 0.37 of a second quicker than Pilipp Weishaupt to win the 1m50 speed class (and €5,000). The pair also took the honours in the 1m45 2-phase class on Sunday, picking up another €5,000.

Denis then travelled to Kentucky as part of the Irish Team to the Alltech FEI World Equestrian Games, Jumping World Championships: (Dermott Lennon – Hallmark Elite; Denis Lynch – Lantinus; Cian O’Connor – K Club Lady; Billy Twomey – Tinka’s Serenade. After the opening competition – a Speed Class – Lynch lay in 65th on 7.42 faults, and the Team lay in 8th – less than 8 faults of Gold. Day 2 saw the Nations Cup competition. After the first round, Lynch dropped down to 85th after having an uncharacteristic 12 faults, and the Team had dropped to 12th – missing the cut to jump in the second round and fight for Olympic qualification.

Lynch then travelled to the CSI3* 'Baltic Horse Show' in Keil, Germany. In the 1m50 Grand Prix qualifier on Friday, he and Abberuail van het Dingeshof finished 8th with 4 faults in the jump-off. On Saturday night, he was first to go in the jump-off of the 1m50 'Cellagon' Championship of Keil, again with Abberuail van het Dingeshof. This time the pair posted a double clear to finish 4th – less than half a second behind the winner – to collect €1,200.

CSI5*-W Equita' Lyon, France: In the opening class – a 1m45 two-phase class – Lynch steered Abberuail van het Dingeshof to 4th place to earn €2,000. On Saturday, with the same horse, he finished 5th in a 1m55 jump-off class to collect a further €3,000. Then in the 'Equita Masters' that evening, Lynch posted the fastest jump-off time with Lantinus, but with 4 faults to finish 8th and earn €4,000. The money kept amounting for Denis when he and Nabab's Son earned another €2,400 when the pair finished 4th in the 1m50 one-round class on Sunday morning. In the Rolex FEI World Cup qualifier, Lynch opted to ride Abberuail van het Dingeshof, the pair again posted a very quick time, but with 8 faults they could only secure 8th position and €7,000 of the €200,000 prize fund.

CSI4* Munich Indoors, Munich, Germany – the Final leg of the DKB Riders Tour: In the Grand Prix, Lynch and Abberuail van het Dingeshof finished 3rd (to earn €12,000) – enough to secure the highly coveted title: Rider of the Year – and a €50,000 VW Touareg.

CSI2* Oldenburg, Germany: In the Grand Prix, Lynch and Upsilon d'Ocquier finished 9th. The pair had 4 faults in the first round, but posted the fastest time to finish top of the faulters.

CSI5*-W Stuttgart German Masters: Lynch qualified as one of 12 for the 'Mercedes' German Masters. He took an early lead with Abberuail van het Dingeshof but eventually finished 4th (€8,000). The competition was won by the triple World Cup Champion pair of Meredith Michaels-Beerbaum and Shutterfly. In the six-bar on Saturday night, he and Tarpan finished 2nd to earn over €3,500.

CSI5*-W Audi Masters Brussels, Belgium: In the opening class on Friday night, Lynch and Abberuail van het Dingeshof were quick enough to take 4th prize of €4,000.

CSI5* Gucci Masters, Paris, France: Lynch and Upsilon d'Ocquier took 8th place and €1,200 in the Rolex Speed Challenge on the opening night.

CSI5*-W Geneva, Switzerland: In the 'Rolex' Top Ten final on Friday night, Lynch and Lantinus finished 2nd to take CHF 50,000. He also partnered Tarpan to finish joint-3rd in the 'Mont Blanc' Six-Bar on Thursday night to earn CHF 1,670. The pair also took 4th prize of €1,400 in the Accumulator on Saturday.

CSI4* Frankfurt, Germany: The Grand Prix took place on Sunday afternoon, and in this, Lynch and Lantinus Jumped double-clear to take 2nd prize of €25,000. In the 1m45 winning round on Saturday night, he directed Tarpan to 6th prize of €1,200

== 2011 ==
On 12 January, it was reported that Lynch has withdrawn from competing as a member of the Irish Team. 'Irreconcilable differences' over team tactics, and with the Irish Chef d'Equipe – Robert Splaine – were the problems. Horse Sport Ireland released a statement on 14 January stating that they had gone as far as to offer to fly the Chairman of Horse Sport Ireland Joe Walsh, the Team Manager Robert Splaine, and the CEO of Horse Sport Ireland Damian McDonald to Europe to meet with Denis and his owner, but Lynch could not see 'any benefit' in doing so. Lynch responded saying that the decision 'was very difficult to take and was taken after considerable deliberation'. He also said that he wanted to 'draw a line under this matter now', but did not rule out riding for Ireland again in the future. At the beginning of March, both parties released statements indicating that the issues had been resolved.

CSI5* Basel, Switzerland: In the 'Championat of Stadt Basel' – a 1m50 jump-off class – Lynch directed Lantinus to 5th prize of €6,200. In the 1m50 jump-off class on Saturday, he and All Inclusive Nrw finished 6th to take over €1,500. On Sunday, in the 'Grand Hotel Les Trois Rois' 1m45 jump-off, the pair took 3rd prize of €6,200.

CSI4* Amsterdam, the Netherlands: Lynch directed Abbervail van het Dingeshof to 4th place in the Grand Prix to collect €7,500.

CSI5*-W Zurich, Switzerland: Denis and Abbervail van het Dingeshof finished second to take nearly €18,000 in the 'Liebherr-Prize' – a 1m50 two-phase class. On Saturday, he partnered Lacroix to the top-spot in the 1m40 speed class to earn €7,800.

CSI5*-W Bordeaux, France: Lynch and All Inclusive NRW took the top prize of €10,500 in the feature class on the opening night – a 1m50 jump-off class. The following day, he and Upsilon d'Ocquier took 3rd prize of €3,750 in 1m45 speed class. In Sunday morning's Accumulator, Lynch and Lacroix took 2nd prize of €5,000.

CSI5*-W Vigo, Spain: He and Abbervail van het Dingeshof finished 5th in the Grand Prix to take €12,200. The pair also took 14th prize of €1,150 in the Rolex FEI World Cup qualifier.

CSI3* Neumunster, Germany: Lynch and Lacroix took second prize of €7670 in the Grand Prix

CSI5*-W Gothenburg, Sweden: In the Rolex FEI World Cup, he and Abbervail van het Dingeshof jumped a 0/4 to finish 6th – this brought Lynch within grasp of the World Cup Final, and he earned €4,500. He and All Inclusive NRW had a single time fault in the first round of the Grand Prix to settle for 9th prize of €1,245. On Friday night, Lynch and Abbervail van het Dingeshof took joint-second prize of €2,400 in the Six-Bar competition.

CSI4* Braunschweiger, Germany: 'Volkswagen' 1m55 Grand Prix: 9th on Abbervail van het Dingeshof to collect €1,000.

CSI5* Global Champions Tour Doha, Qatar: In the Grand Prix which saw only 3 double-clear rounds, Lynch and All Inclusive NRW finished 5th with just a single time-fault in each round to earn €25,000. The pair also finished 5th in the 1m50 jump-off class on Thursday night to earn a further €3,750.

CSI5*-W 's-Hertogenbosch, the Netherlands: Going into this final opportunity for World Cup qualification, Lynch needed valuable points to move into the top-18 to earn qualification to the Final in Leipzig. He and Abbervail van het Dingeshof took maximum points in this leg by winning the Rolex FEI World Cup class ensuring a place in the final, and taking €58,000 in prize money. He and Lacroix also placed 4th in a 1m50 winning round class on Friday night to secure €2,700 in prize money, and in the 1m35 Table C Derby on Saturday evening, Upsilon d'Ocquier was beaten by just 0.37 second into second place to earn €5,000

CSI3* Leipzig, Germany: Lynch partnered All Inclusive NRW to an Irish one-two in the €100,000 Grand Prix collecting €20,000.

CSI5* Global Champions Tour of Valencia, Spain: Lacroix took 5th prize of €1,840 in a 1m45 class on Friday. The pair also took 6th prize of €1,380 in another 1m45 class on Saturday. Lynch then partnered Abbervail van het Dingeshof to 5th place in the GCT Grand Prix to take €16,000, and bring Denis up to 2nd position in the GCT Rankings.

CSI3* Mannheim, Germany: All Inclusive NRW took 3rd prize of €7,500 in the Grand Prix.

CSI3* Noerten Hardenberg, Germany: Abbervail van het Dingeshof earned €4,600 by finishing 2nd in a 1m45 class.

CSI5* Global Champions Tour / CSI3* Hamburg, Germany: Lantinus took the top prize of a €60,000 Mercedes SLK in the 'Mercedes-Benz Championat von Hamburg' on the opening day. Lynch also partnered All Inclusive NRW to 13th place (on 5 faults) in the GCT Grand Prix, taking €2,850 in prize money, and dropping to 3rd in the GCT Rankings. In the final competition – the DKB Riders Tour Derby – he and Upsilon d'Ocquier took 9th prize of €2,500.

CSI5* Global Champions Tour Cannes, France: Lantinus made his Grand Prix return to finish 5th and take €16,000 in prize money. This result left Lynch in 3rd position in the GCT Rankings. Night Train also took 2nd prize of €3,680 in a 1m50 class.

CSI5* Global Champions Tour Monte Carlo, Monaco: Night Train took €1,050 in a 1m45 class on Friday night by finishing in 8th position.

CSI5* Global Champions Tour Estoril, Portugal: Nabab's Son jumped 4/4 in the Grand Prix to settle for 16th prize of €2,000.

CSIO5* Falsterbo, Sweden: Lynch and Lord Luis took 3rd prize of €3,200 in a 1m50 class. The pair also jumped clear in the first round of the FEI Nations Cup.

CSIO5* World Equestrian Festival, Aachen, Germany: The Irish team finished 2nd in the FEI Nations Cup on Thursday night: Shane Breen (Carmena Z) 8/0; Shane Sweetnam (Amaretto d'Arco) 0/4; Denis Lynch (All Inclusive NRW) 4/0; Billy Twomey (Tinka's Serenade) (8)/(5). On Saturday night, Lynch directed Night Train to 2nd place (behind fellow Irishman – Shane Breen) in the 'Sparkasse Derby' to earn €5,200. The same night, he also finished 3rd on Lord Luis in the €55,000 'Best of Champions' competition to take €8,000 in prize money.

CSI5* Global Champions Tour Chantilly, France: Lynch and Night Train earned 3rd prize of €6,160 in the 'Equida' Grand Prix on Sunday.

CSIO5* 'Discover Ireland' RDS Dublin Horse Show, Ireland: Night Train took second prize of €5,000 in the 'Power and Speed' competition on Friday, and on the same night, All Inclusive NRW earned €1,300 by finishing 4th in the Six Bar. The Irish team finished 2nd in the FEI Nations Cup on Saturday: Billy Twomey (Tinka's Serenade) 0/(Ret)/ jump-off for first place: Retired; Shane Sweetnam (Amaretto d'Arco) 0/0; Nicola Fitzgibbon (Puissance) 4/0; Denis Lynch (All Inclusive NRW) (5)/4. On Saturday, Lynch and Nabab's Son earned €1,200 by finishing 7th in the 1m50 Dublin Stakes.

CSI5*-GCT Valkenswaard, the Netherlands: During the 3-day show, Lynch picked up in excess of €72,000. €60,000 of this came from Lantinus' 2nd place finish in the GCT Grand Prix on Saturday. Night Train also had a successful show, winning the Medium Tour final for €7,360, and took €3,680 by finishing 2nd in another 1m50 class. Upsilon d'Ocquier finished 6th in the Derby on Sunday, earning €1,086.

CSI5*-GCT Rio de Janeiro, Brazil: In the opening class – a 1m45 speed class – Lynch and Night Train took 6th prize of €1,500.

CSI3* Paderborn, Germany: Contifex took 4th prize of €2,000 in a 1m50 class on Friday. The pair also took 5th prize of €1,500 in a 1m45 class on Sunday.

CES5* European Championships, Madrid, Spain: Shane Sweetnam (Amaretto d'Arco) 3.46/8/8; Nicola Fitzgibbon (Puissance) (9.74)/(21)/(20); Denis Lynch (Lantinus) 8.71/9/4; Billy Twomey (Tinka's Serenade) 0.95/0/12; After round 1, Ireland lay 9th on 13.12 faults behind France in the lead on 2.95. Ireland climbed to 7th position and within the Olympic qualification threshold, but their third round performances dropped them to 9th and out of Olympic qualification.

CSI3* Donaueschingen, Germany: Lynch and Lord Luis finished 6th in the Middle Tour Final to earn €1,400.

CSI3* Horse of the Year Show, Birmingham, UK: Lord Luis took second prize of £4,300 (€5,000) in a speed class on Thursday night.

CSI5*-W 'Kingsland' Horse Show, Oslo, Norway: Lynch and Lantinus took 5th prize of €12,000 in the Rolex FEI World Cup.

CSI5*-W Equita Lyon, France: Lynch and the eight-year-old Contifex finished 2nd in the Equita'Masters to take €20,000. Lantinus took 6th prize of €10,000 in the Rolex FEI World Cup to bring Lynch to 4th in the overall rankings. Abberuail van het Dingeshof finished 2nd in the opening class, a 1m45 two-phase class, earning €4,600, and that evening, in the qualifier for the Rolex FEI World Cup, Lynch and Lantinus finished second and earned €11,200.

CSI5*-W Verona, Italy: Lynch and Lord Luis picked up €5,000 in prize money in the 1m50 Grand Prix that was won by fellow Irishman, Niall Talbot. Abberuail van het Dingeshof also earned €5,000 for finishing second in the 1m50 Accumulator, and a further €1,650 for 6th place in a 1m50 speed class.

CSI4* Vienna, Austria: The eight-year-old Contifex took 4th prize of €8,000 in the Grand Prix on Monday. Crocant also earned €1,000 for 9th place in the Derby on Saturday night.

CSI5*-W Stuttgart, Germany: Lynch and Abberuail van het Dingeshof finished 6th in the Rolex FEI World Cup to earn €8,000. Contifex picked up €1,000 for 9th place in a 1m55 jump-off class.

CSI5* GCT Final Abu Dhabi, UAE: Lantinus jumped 0/8 to finish 18th in the Grand Prix for €3,000. This result meant Lynch finished 6th in the GCT Rankings of 2011, earning €33,750.

CSI5* Gucci Masters Paris, France: Abberuail van het Dingeshof took 7th prize in the Rolex IJRC Top Ten Final, earning €10,000. On Saturday, Lynch and Night Train also won a 1m45 two-phase class worth €7,000 to the winner, and Crocant took 9th prize of €2,600 in a 1m50 jump-off class.

CSI5*-W Geneva, Switzerland: Upsilon d'Ocuqier took equal-first prize of €5,120 (6,330CHF) in the Six Bar. In the Grand Prix jump-off of 16 combinations, Lantinus was early to jump and took the lead, but they were eventually beaten by less three seconds, and by 8 other riders to finish 9th and earned €4,050 (5,000CHF).

CSI5* La Coruna, Spain: Lantinus jumped 4/8 in the Grand Prix to finish 8th and earn €4,230.

CSI5*-W Mechelen, Germany: Lynch partnered Abbervail van het Dingeshof to 5th prize of €10,000 in the Rolex FEI World Cup, moving him to 2nd in the overall rankings. He also rode Night Train to first position in a 1m45 class worth €6,500 to the winner.

== 2012 ==
CSI5*-W Leipzig, Germany: Abbervail van het Dingeshof just missed out on winning a car by finishing second in the 1m50 'Championat von Leipzig', but won €4,800. Upsilon d'Ocquier finished joint-first in the Six-Bar to earn €4,575. Twister S also won €2,000 for finishing 5th in a 1m45 class.

CSI5*-W Zurich, Switzerland: Lynch and Night Train won a 1m40 class worth €8,300 (10,000CHF) to the winner.

CSI5*-W Bordeaux, France: The nine-year-old, Contifex jumped double-clear in the Rolex FEI World Cup and took fourth prize of €15,000. He also earned €1,000 in the Grand Prix for finishing 11th. Upsilon d'Oquier finished joint-second in the Six-Bar to earn €3,500.

CSI3* Neumuenster, Germany: In the 1m50 one-round class on Friday night, Lantinus took 3rd prize of €3,450. The pair also took 2nd prize in a 1m50 jump-off class to earn €4,600.

CSI5*-W Gothenburg, Sweden: Abberuail van het Dingeshof finished second in the 1m55 Grand Prix to earn 130,000SEK (€14,695). The pair also took second prize of 45,000SEK (€5,086) in a 1m45 jump-off class. In the final Rolex FEI World Cup leg of the season, Lynch and Lantinus finished 7th to earn 36,000SEK (€4,069). The course was described by Kevin Staut as 'the most difficult leg of the season', but this result left Lynch in 3rd place in the overall standings.

CSI3* Bremen, Germany: Lynch partnered Abbervail van het Dingeshof to 4th place in the 1m50 'Championat von Bremen' to earn €1,610.

CSI3* Dortmund, Germany: All Inclusive NRW had 4 faults in round 1 of the Grand Prix which was only good enough for 8th position and €1,500 prize money.

CSI5* Paris, France: In a 1m60 pairs competition, Lynch and Abbervail van het Dingeshof joined Athina Onassis de Miranda and AD Unaniem, where just one time-fault them left them short of the top prize to settle for second prize of €10,000. Abbervail van het Dingeshof also earned €4,000 for 9th position in the Grand Prix. In a 1m45 jump-off where less than a second separated the top 6, Lantinus finished 6th to earn €1,035.

CSI5* GCT Doha, Qatar: In the Grand Prix, Lynch guided Lantinus to an 11th prize of €4,500 with a score of 4/0. The pair also finished 10th in a 1m50 class to earn €1,150.

CSI5*-W Rolex FEI World Cup Final, 's-Hertogenbosch, the Netherlands: After five jumping rounds, Lynch and Abbervail van het Dingeshof finished 11th. In the process, they took joint-third prize of €9,350 in Final III.

CSI4* DKB Riders Tour Hagen, Germany: Lynch and Night Train won the 1m40 Middle Tour Final worth €5,750 to the winner. All Star 5 jumped double clear in a 1m50 jump-off class to finish 5th and earn €2,100. Lantinus was also in the money, but with the second fastest jump-off time he could only manage 11th prize of €1,875 with 8 faults.

CSI5*-GCT Valencia, Spain: Abbervail van het Dingeshof jumped double-clear in the Grand Prix to earn a spot in the five-horse jump-off. He posted the fastest time, but at the expense of 4 faults to finish in eventual 4th place to earn €42,750.

CSIO5* La Baule, France: Lynch and Lantinus jumped 4/4 in the FEI Nations Cup to help Ireland secure equal-fifth position. In the Derby, Night Train took the top prize of €17,500, but he spooked in the lap of honour which resulted in his rider being taken away in an ambulance.

== Major results ==
- 2012
  - 3rd, Grand Prix – CSI5*-GCT Valencia, Spain, (Abbervail van het Dingeshof)
  - 3rd, Final III – CSI5*-W Rolex FEI World Cup Final, 's-Hertogenbosch, the Netherlands, (Abbervail van het Dingeshof)
  - 2nd, Grand Prix (1m55) – CSI5* Gothenburg, Sweden, (Abbervail van het Dingeshof)
- 2011
  - 2nd, Masters – CSI5*-W Lyon, France (Contifex)
  - 2nd, GCT Grand Prix – CSI5* Valkenswaard, the Netherlands, (Lantinus)
  - 3rd, Grand Prix (1m50) – CSI5* Chantilly, France, (Night Train)
  - 3rd, Grand Prix – CSI3* Mannheim, Germany, (All Inclusive NRW)
  - 1st, Grand Prix – CSI3* Leipzig, Germany, (All Inclusive NRW)
  - 1st, Rolex FEI World Cup – CSI5*-W 's-Hertogenbosch, the Netherlands, (Abbervail van het Dingeshof)
  - 2nd, Grand Prix – CSI3* Neumunster, Germany, (Lacroix)
- 2010
  - 2nd, Grand Prix – CSI4* Frankfurt, Germany, (Lantinus)
  - 2nd, 'Rolex / IJRC' Top Ten Final – CSI5*-W Geneva, Switzerland, (Lantinus)
  - 3rd, Grand Prix – CSI4* Munich Indoors, Munich, Germany, (Abbervail van het Dingeshof)
  - 2nd, Grand Prix – Final of the GCT, CSI5* Rio de Janeiro, Brazil, (All Inclusive NRW)
  - 2nd, GCT Grand Prix – CSI5* Valkensward, the Netherlands, (Lantinus)
  - 1st, Meydan FEI Nations Cup of Aachen, Germany, (Lantinus)
  - 2nd, Grand Prix – CSI4* Balve, Germany, (Lantinus)
  - 1st, Grand Prix – CSI4* Weisbaden, Germany, (Abberuail van het Dingeshof)
  - 3rd, Grand Prix – CSI2* Lummen, Belgium, (Lacroix)
  - 1st, FEI Nations Cup of Belgium – CSIO4* Lummen, Belgium, (Abbervail van het Dingeshof)
  - 3rd, Grand Prix – CSI4* Braunschweig, Germany, (Abbervail van het Dingeshof)
- 2009
  - 2nd, Grand Prix – CSI5* Paris, France, (All Inclusive)
  - 3rd, Grand Prix – CSI4* Kiel, Germany, (Tarpan)
  - 3rd, Grand Prix – CSI2* Valkenswaard, the Netherlands, (Abbervail van het Dingeshof)
  - 1st, Meydan Nations Cup – CSIO5* Falsterbo, Sweden, (Lantinus)
  - 1st, Grand Prix – CSIO5* Aachen, Germany, (Lantinus)
- 2008
  - 3rd, Grand Prix – CSI5*-W Olympia, London, United Kingdom, (Nabab's Son)
  - 1st, Grand Prix – CSIO5* Rome, Italy, (Lantinus)
  - 1st, Grand Prix – CSIO5* La Baule, France (Lantinus)
  - 1st, Grand Prix – CSI5* Global Champions Tour, Doha, Qatar, (Lantinus)
- 2007
  - 1st, Grand Prix – CSI3* Dresden, Germany, (Lantinus)
  - 3rd FEI World Cup Qualifier – CSIO4*-W Zagreb, Croatia, (Upsilon D'Ocquier)
- 2006
  - 1st, Samsung Super League Nations Cup – CSIO5* Falsterbo, Sweden, (Lancelot 200)
