= Niels Bruynseels =

Belgian equestrian (born 1983)

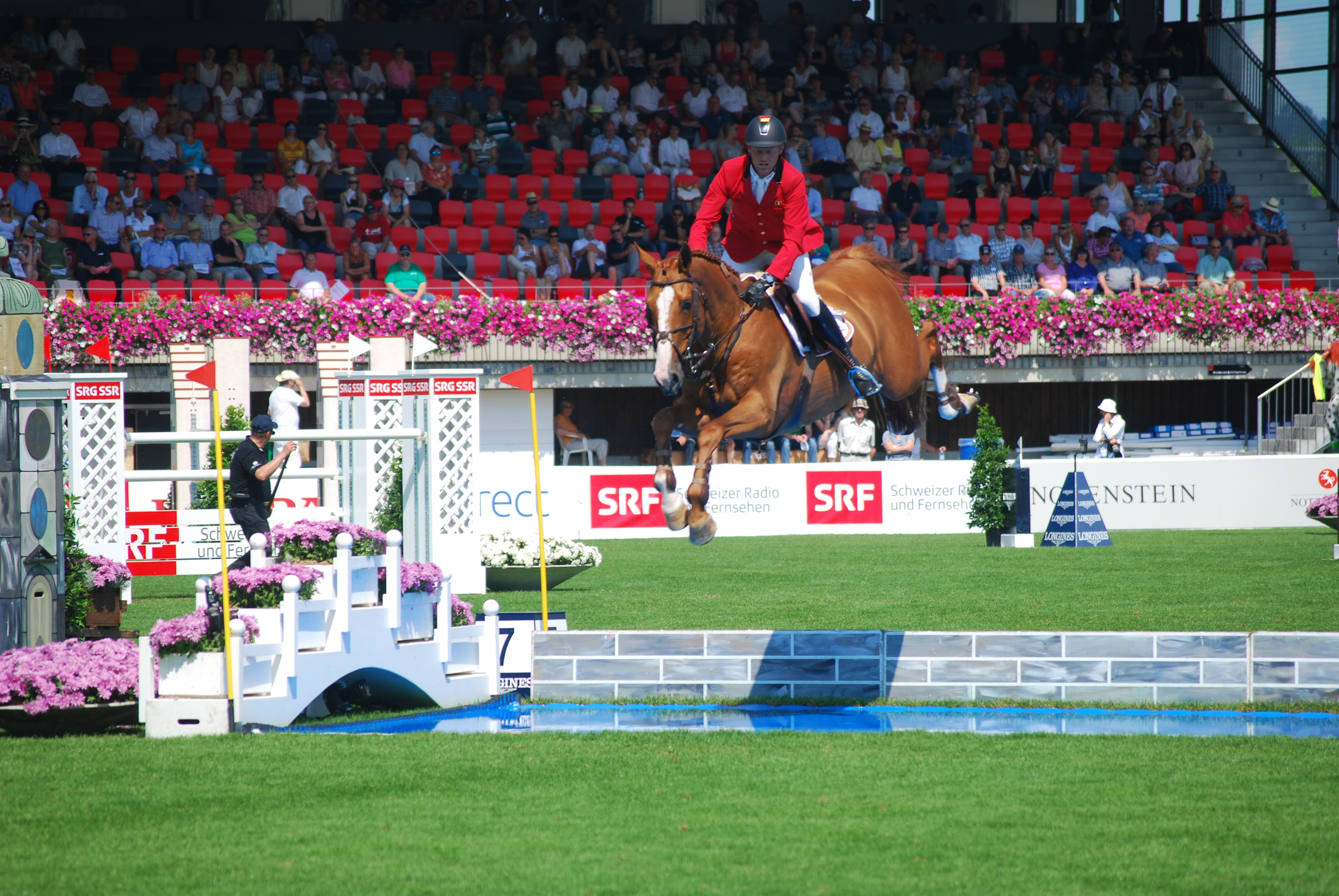

Personal information
- Nationality: Belgian
- Born: 5 December 1983 (age 42)

Sport
- Sport: Equestrian
- Event: Show jumping

Niels Bruynseels (born 5 December 1983) is a Belgian show jumping competitor. He represented Belgium at the 2020 Summer Olympics in Tokyo 2021, competing in individual jumping.
