= Piet Raijmakers =

Dutch equestrian

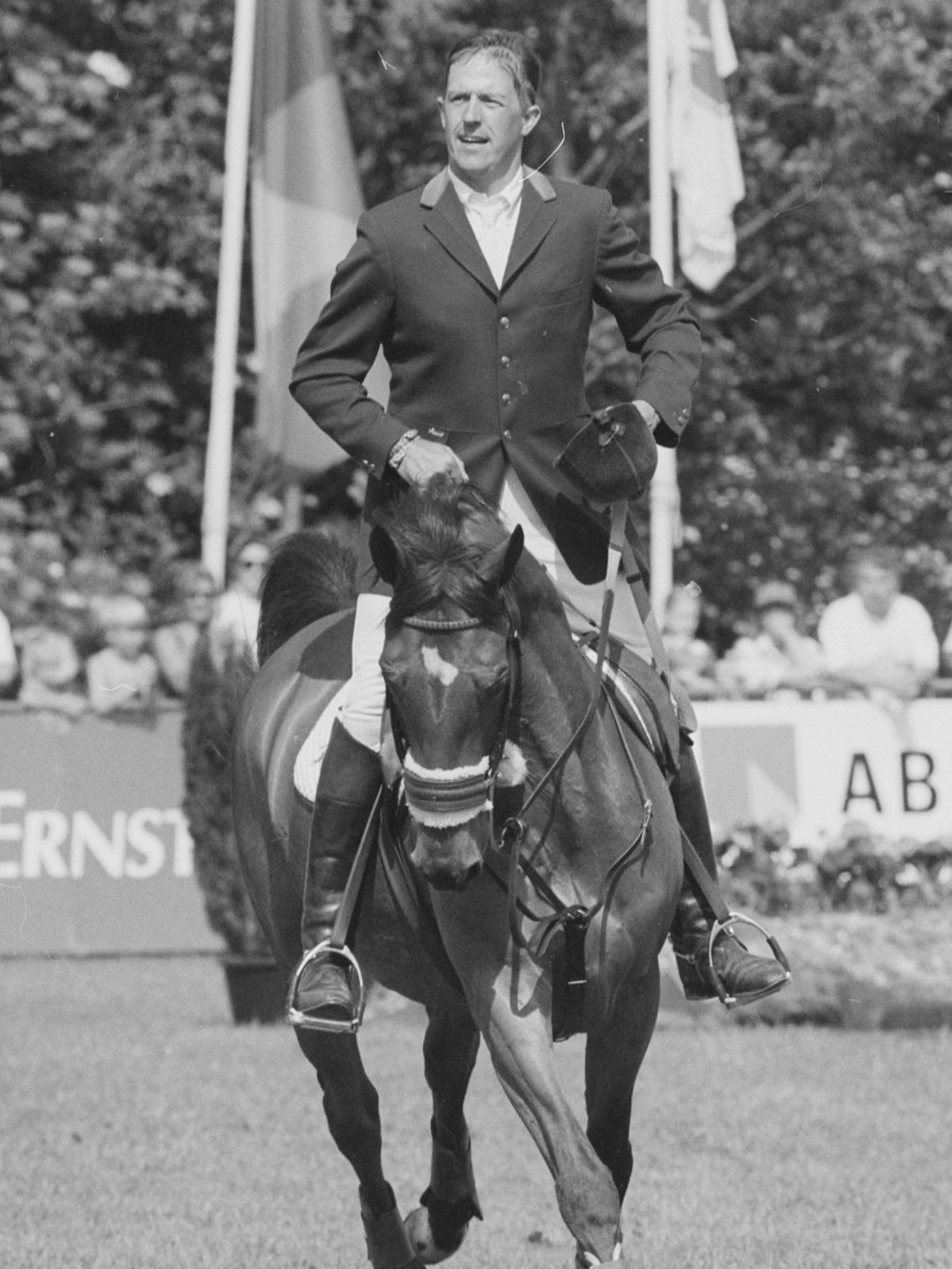
- Raijmakers in 1996

Medal record

Equestrian

Representing the Netherlands

Olympic Games
Gold medal – first place	1992 Barcelona	Team jumping
Silver medal – second place	1992 Barcelona	Individual jumping

European Championships
Gold medal – first place	1991 La Baule	Team jumping

Petrus Josephus "Piet" Raijmakers (born 29 September 1956, in Asten) is a former equestrian from the Netherlands.

Raijmakers won the gold medal in the show jumping team event at the 1992 Summer Olympics in Barcelona, Spain. He did so alongside Jos Lansink, Jan Tops and Bert Romp. In the individual jumping competition Raijmakers claimed the silver medal on Ratina Z, behind Germany's Ludger Beerbaum on Classic Touch.

In 2006, Raijmakers won team gold alongside Jeroen Dubbeldam, Gerco Schröder and Albert Zoer at the World Equestrian Games in Aachen.

At the World Cup-horse show "Indoor Brabant" in 's-Hertogenbosch (March 2010), he ended his sporting career. His sons, Piet Raijmakers Jr. and Joep Raijmakers, are also active equestrians.
