= FEI World Cup Jumping 2011/2012, Western European League =

The Western European League of the FEI World Cup Jumping 2011/2012 is the 34th edition of the west and central European league of the Show Jumping World Cup. In this area the Western European League is the most important indoor series in show jumping.

== The league ==
The first ever European league of the Show Jumping World Cup was held in 1978/1979. They consisted of nine competitions. Today, the 2011/2012 season, consists of thirteen indoor competitions. All events with a Western European League competition are advertised as CSI 5*-W, the highest possible difficulty in show jumping (-W means World Cup).

The tournament series runs from October 12, 2011 to February 26, 2012. The best 18 riders of the Western European League ranking are qualified for the World Cup Jumping Final in 's-Hertogenbosch in the Netherlands. Also "extra competitors" (riders from nations outside of the Western European League who live in west or central Europe) can qualify through the Western European League.

The World Cup competitions of the Western European League are held on Sunday afternoon or Saturday evening. They are held as show jumping competitions with one jump-off. The height of the obstacles are up to 1,60 meters. The competitions have a purse of at least 100,000 €.

The main sponsor of the 2011/2012 Western European League is Rolex.

== Media ==
The FEI broadcast all competitions of the Western European League via its website FEI TV with costs. In the nations of the world cup event the world cup competition is mostly broadcast live by television. Across Europe Eurosport shows a recording of the world cup competitions on Wednesday evening.

== The events ==
=== 1st competition: Oslo ===
The first Western European League competition is traditionally held in Oslo. The Oslo Horse Show was held from October 12 to October 16, 2011 in the Telenor Arena. The World Cup competition was held on October 16 from 3:30 pm.

The high number of 14 riders qualify for the jump-off. With 34.12 seconds Rolf-Göran Bengtsson with Casall had the fastest time but one jumping fault. At the end he was ninth.

Nearly half a second slower but faultless was the winner of the competition, Pius Schwizer. The competition had a purse of 98,000 Euro and a car of the competition sponsor, Land Rover.

	Rider	Horse	Round 1		Jump-off		scoring points
	Rider	Horse	Penalties	Time (s)	Penalties	Time (s)	scoring points
1	(Switzerland) Pius Schwizer	Carlina	0	-	0	34.63	20
2	(Germany) Philipp Weishaupt	Souvenir	0	-	0	35.87	17
3	(Portugal) Luciana Diniz	Winningmood	0	-	0	36.64	15

(top 3 of 40 competitors)

=== 2nd competition: Helsinki ===
The Helsinki International Horse Show was held from October 20 to October 23, 2011 in the Hartwall Arena in Helsinki. Here the second competition of the 2011/2012 Western European League was held. The World Cup competition started on October 23 at 2:45 pm. The show jumping course was built by Guilherme Jorge from Brazil.

In the first round nine riders with their horses had no faults. In the jump-off Patrice Delaveau had the very fastest time (35.14 seconds) but one jumping fault. Four riders had no faults in the jump-off, Pius Schwizer won again a World Cup competition. With this result Schwizer is nearly sure qualified for the 2012 World Cup final. The competition had a total prize money of €110,000.

	Rider	Horse	Round 1		Jump-off		scoring points
	Rider	Horse	Penalties	Time (s)	Penalties	Time (s)	scoring points
1	(Switzerland) Pius Schwizer	Carlina	0	-	0	37.58	20
2	(Netherlands) Maikel van der Vleuten	Verdi	0	-	0	38.30	17
3	(Sweden) Malin Baryard-Johnsson	Reveur de Hurtebise	0	-	0	40.62	15

(top 3 of 37 competitors)

=== 3rd competition: Lyon ===
Since 2009 the Equitá Lyon is a World Cup event. In 2011 the event was held from October 26 to October 30 in the Eurexpo in Lyon. The World Cup competition was held at 3:00 pm on October 30. The show jumping course was built by German course designer Frank Rothenberger.

Nine riders had no faults in round one, one rider (Malin Baryard-Johnsson) had one time fault. The competitors had times from 40.88 bis 44.24 seconds in the jump-off. The fastest time in the jump-off had Rolf-Göran Bengtsson, he was also faultless so he won the competition. A purse of €200,000 was distributed in this competition.

	Rider	Horse	Round 1		Jump-off		scoring points
	Rider	Horse	Penalties	Time (s)	Penalties	Time (s)	scoring points
1	(Sweden) Rolf-Göran Bengtsson	Casall	0	-	0	40.88	20
2	(Ukraine) Katharina Offel	Cathleen	0	-	0	40.95	17
3	(Switzerland) Steve Guerdat	Nino des Buissonnets	0	-	0	41.62	15

(top 3 of 40 competitors)

=== 4th competition: Verona ===
The Italian competition of the Western European League was held from November 3 to November 6, 2011 as part of the trade fair Fieracavalli. Location of this event was the Veronafiere in Verona.

In round 1, Eric Lamaze ride his horse Hickstead. After finishing the course, Hickstead collapsed and died. At the request of the riders the competition was stopped. A minute of silence was held after this.

Hickstead really was a horse in a million and my heart goes out to Eric and everyone connected with this wonderful horse. This is a terrible loss, but Hickstead truly will never be forgotten. We were very lucky to have known him.

— Princess Haya bint Al Hussein, President of the FEI

=== 5th competition: Stuttgart ===
As part of the Stuttgart German Masters the fifth competition of the 2011/2012 Western European League was held. The event was held from November 16 to November 20, 2011 in the Hanns-Martin-Schleyer-Halle in Stuttgart. The Grand Prix of Stuttgart, the World Cup competition, has held at November 20 at 2:55 pm. The course was built, like last year, by local course designer Christa Jung.

The Grand Prix was held less than one week before the last competition of this year's Global Champions Tour, nevertheless many international top riders had started here. The first round was built very difficult, eight horse-rider-pairs including last year's winner (Carsten-Otto Nagel and Corradina) retired. Six riders with their horses was qualified for the jump-off, five of them had also in the jump-off no faults.

The purse of this competition was €100,000 and for the winner a car of Mercedes-Benz, the sponsor of this competition.

	Rider	Horse	Round 1		Jump-off		scoring points
	Rider	Horse	Penalties	Time (s)	Penalties	Time (s)	scoring points
1	(Germany) Ludger Beerbaum	Gotha FRH	0	-	0	35.70	20
2	(Switzerland) Steve Guerdat	Nino des Buissonnets	0	-	0	35.93	17
3	(Sweden) Rolf-Göran Bengtsson	Casall	0	-	0	36.55	15

(top 3 of 40 competitors)

=== 6th competition: Geneva ===
In the Palexpo in Grand-Saconnex near Geneva, the sixth World Cup event of the 2011–2012 Western European League was held. The CHI Geneve was held in 2011 from December 8 to December 11. The World Cup competition was held there on December 11, 2011 at 2:15 pm. The sow jumping course was built there by Swiss course designer Rolf Lüdi.

The first round was not a big problem for many of the competitors; 16 of 40 riders had no faults in that round – they were qualified for the jump-off. Also in the jump-off, 12 of 16 riders and their horses had no faults in the course; the best five riders had a time between 41.72 and 42.70 seconds. The competition had prize money of CHF 200,000.

	Rider	Horse	Round 1		Jump-off		scoring points
	Rider	Horse	Penalties	Time (s)	Penalties	Time (s)	scoring points
1	(Brazil) Álvaro de Miranda Neto	Ashleigh Drossel Dan	0	-	0	41.72	20
2	(Sweden) Rolf-Göran Bengtsson	Casall	0	-	0	42.22	17
3	(France) Patrice Delaveau	Orient Express	0	-	0	42.42	15

(top 3 of 40 competitors)

=== 7th competition: London ===
Already decorated for Christmas presents each year the Olympia London International Horse Show. This seventh Western European League event is held from December 13 to December 19, 2011. The World Cup competition was held at December 18 at 3:00 pm, the course designer was Bob Ellis from the United Kingdom.

As usual at the London International Horse Show at number of competitions in this competition was with 34 no so high as at other Western European League events. In the first round one rider didn't finish the course, five rider had more than eight penalty points. In total eleven riders had no faults with their horses in the first round - so they was qualified for the jump-off. German rider Holger Wulschner on Cefalo narrowly miss the qualification for the jump: he need eight hundredths of seconds more than the time allowed for the course, so he had one time fault.

In the jump-off a big number of riders had four penalty points, only three riders get clear in this round. With a victory in this competition Ben Maher was furthermore the "Leading Rider of the Show".

	Rider	Horse	Round 1		Jump-off		scoring points
	Rider	Horse	Penalties	Time (s)	Penalties	Time (s)	scoring points
1	(United Kingdom) Ben Maher	Tripple X III	0	-	0	38.71	20
2	(Germany) Marcus Ehning	Sabrina	0	-	0	39.05	17
3	(Republic of Ireland) Dermott Lennon	Hallmark Elite	0	-	0	42.43	15

(top 3 of 34 competitors)

=== 8th competition: Mechelen ===
In Mechelen, Belgium, traditionally the last big horse show in each year is held. This World Cup event, called Jumping Mechelen - Vlaanderens Kerstjumping was held in 2011, as in the previous years, from December 26 to December 30. At the final day at 3:30 pm the World Cup competition was held.

The first round of the World Cup competition was an appropriate test for participants: eight riders had no faults with their horses, they was qualified for the jump-off. Four riders did not finish the first round, only a few riders had time penalty points. In the jump-off five riders had no penalty points. Between the time of the fastest and the slowest rider with no faults in the jump-off were about 1.4 seconds. The winner of the competition was Belgium rider Gregory Wathelet. The prize money of the competition was €100,000 and a car of the competition sponsor Land Rover.

	Rider	Horse	Round 1		Jump-off		scoring points
	Rider	Horse	Penalties	Time (s)	Penalties	Time (s)	scoring points
1	(Belgium) Grégory Wathelet	Copin van de Broy	0	-	0	36.69	20
2	(France) Kevin Staut	Silvana	0	-	0	36.80	17
3	(Belgium) Rik Hemeryck	Quarco de Kerambars	0	-	0	37.45	15

(top 3 of 38 competitors)

=== 9th competition: Leipzig ===
After a break of around a month the 2011/2012 Western European League continued in Leipzig from January 19 to January 22, 2012. The World Cup event, called Partner Pferd, was held in the halls of the new Leipzig Trade Fair.

The first round of the World Cup competition twelve riders had no faults with their horses, and they was qualified for the jump-off. Four riders did not finish the first round. In the jump-off five riders had no penalty points. Between the time of the fastest and the slowest rider with no faults in the jump-off were about 2.42 seconds. The winner of the competition was German rider Christian Ahlmann. The prize money of the competition was €150,000.

	Rider	Horse	Round 1		Jump-off		scoring points
	Rider	Horse	Penalties	Time (s)	Penalties	Time (s)	scoring points
1	(Germany) Christian Ahlmann	Taloubet Z	0	-	0	40.60	20
2	(Germany) Katrin Eckermann	Carlson 46	0	-	0	40.77	17
3	(Germany) Marcus Ehning	Sabrina 327	0	-	0	40.86	15

(top 3 of 39 competitors)

=== 10th competition: Zurich ===
The CSI Zürich is in 2012 fourth time a World Cup horse show. The event was held in the Hallenstadion Zurich from January 27 to January 29, 2012. The Classic called World Cup Competition was held at January 29 at 1:45 pm. The course was designed by Rolf Lüdi from Switzerland. The first round was built very technically, in total seven riders with their horses had no faults in this round. Five of 40 riders retired in round one.

In the jump-off three of seven riders had no penalty points, the winner of the competition was - as in the previous year - a rider from Germany. The prize money of this competition was 258.000 Swiss franc, included a car of the competition sponsor Mercedes-Benz.

	Rider	Horse	Round 1		Jump-off		scoring points
	Rider	Horse	Penalties	Time (s)	Penalties	Time (s)	scoring points
1	(Germany) Marco Kutscher	Cornet Obolensky	0	-	0	31.80	20
2	(France) Patrice Delaveau	Ornella Mail	0	-	0	32.26	17
3	(Australia) Edwina Tops-Alexander	Itot du Château	0	-	0	32.76	15

(top 3 of 40 competitors)

=== 11th competition: Bordeaux ===
The second French event of the 2011/2012 Western European League is the Jumping International de Bordeaux in Bordeaux. This event is held from February 3 to February 5, 2012.

Different from other World Cup horse shows, the World Cup competition in Bordeaux was held on Saturday at 8:30 pm. In the first round 22 of 38 riders had only four or less penalty points. Ten of this riders had no penalty points, they was qualified for the jump-off. The two best rider need a time less than 35 seconds in the jump-off, the time advantage between place two and three was nearly one second.

	Rider	Horse	Round 1		Jump-off		scoring points
	Rider	Horse	Penalties	Time (s)	Penalties	Time (s)	scoring points
1	(France) Kevin Staut	Silvana	0	-	0	34,16	20
2	(Australia) Edwina Tops-Alexander	Itot du Château	0	-	0	34,59	17
3	(Belgium) Rik Hemeryck	Quarco de Kerambars	0	-	0	35,54	15

(top 3 of 38 competitors)

=== Vigo ===
The most southern event of the Western European League should take place in Vigo, Spain, from February 9 to February 12, 2012. In October 2011 the organizers of the World Cup tournament in Vigo had announced that the 2012 CSI Vigo are cancelled because of economic difficulties.

=== 12th competition: Gothenburg ===
The last event of the 2011/2012 Western European League was the Göteborg Horse Show. The event was held in Gothenburg from February 23 to February 26, 2012, the competition was held at February 26 at 3:30 pm.

In total 38 riders had started in the World Cup competition of Gothenburg, which course was built by Uliano Vezzani. The first round was challenging for the riders and their horses, only 15 of them had four or less penalty points.

In the jump-off only two of five riders had no faults. As last rider of the jump-off Philipp Weishaupt on Monte Bellini had the chance to win the competition, but he had nine penalty points. Marco Kutscher, who had ridden Satisfaction FRH in this competition, has won this competition - the second World Cup competition victory in this season.

	Rider	Horse	Round 1		Jump-off		scoring points
	Rider	Horse	Penalties	Time (s)	Penalties	Time (s)	scoring points
1	(Germany) Marco Kutscher	Satisfaction FRH	0	-	0	39.40	20
2	(Belgium) Ludo Philippaerts	Kassini Jac	0	-	0	45.35	17
3	(France) Kevin Staut	Le Prestige de Hus	0	-	4	37.41	15

(top 3 of 38 competitors)

== Ranking ==
The best 18 riders of the ranking after the last Western European League competition are qualified for the World Cup Final, if they start for a nation from west or central Europe. Also riders from other nations who live in west or central Europe ("extra competitors") are qualified for the finale, if they have at least the same number of ranking points as the 18th best rider from west or central Europe.

Riders from the Western European League can also earn points in the North American League of the FEI World Cup Jumping 2011/2012.

	rider	Oslo	Helsinki	Lyon	Verona	Stuttgart	Geneva	London	Mechelen	Leipzig	Zurich	Bordeaux	Vigo	Gothenburg	North American League	ranking points
1	(France) Kevin Staut	10	(0)	13	/	(0)	9	4	17	(0)	(0)	20	/	15	—	88
2	(Sweden) Rolf-Göran Bengtsson	7	—	20	/	15	17	12	—	(3)	3	—	/	5	—	79
3	(Republic of Ireland) Denis Lynch	12	(0)	11	/	11	8	—	12	(0)	(0)	13	/	10	—	77
4	(Germany) Marco Kutscher	1	—	6	/	13	7	—	—	6	20	(0)	/	20	—	73
5	(France) Patrice Delaveau	3	12	4	/	8	15	—	—	1	17	(0)	/	—	—	60
6	(Switzerland) Pius Schwizer	20	20	(0)	/	(0)	(0)	0	—	8	0	0	/	7	—	55
7	(Switzerland) Steve Guerdat	0	6	15	/	17	13	—	—	—	0	0	/	—	—	51
8	(Germany) Ludger Beerbaum	—	—	10	/	20	0	—	—	9	4	6	/	0	—	49
9	(Sweden) Malin Baryard-Johnsson	0	15	7	/	—	—	1	—	—	6	12	/	8	—	49
10	(United Kingdom) Nick Skelton	—	—	—	/	—	—	0	—	—	—	—	/	—	48	48

(top ten riders)

== World Cup Final ==
Together with the World Cup Final of the Dressage World Cup the 2012 FEI World Cup Jumping Final will be held in 's-Hertogenbosch in the Netherlands from April 18 to April 22, 2012.
