= 2008 CSIO Spruce Meadows 'Masters' Tournament – CN International =

The 2008 CN International was a Grand Prix show jumping event held at Spruce Meadows in Calgary, Alberta, Canada on September 7, 2008 during the 2008 CSIO Spruce Meadows 'Masters' Tournament. With a $1,000,000 purse, the CN International is one of the richest show jumping events in the world. Nick Skelton of the United Kingdom won the event riding Arko III, obtaining only one penalty over the two rounds of competition to claim the $325,000 first prize.

== Results ==
=== Round 1 ===
	Rider	Horse	Penalties	Time (s)
1	(Mexico) Jaime Azcarraga	Presley Boy	0	87.610
2	(United States) Todd Minikus	Pavarotti	0	87.880
3	(United Kingdom) Nick Skelton	Arko III	0	89.361
4	(Canada) Eric Lamaze	Hickstead	0	89.447
5	(Italy) Piergiorgio Bucci	Da Zara Porto Rico	0	89.828
6	(United Kingdom) Tim Gredley	Omelli	0	90.211
7	(United Kingdom) Ben Maher	Robin Hood W	0	91.804
8	(Belgium) Jos Lansink	Cavalor Cumano	1	93.439
9	(United States) Richard Spooner	Cristallo	4	85.543
10	(France) Roger-Yves Bost	Ideal de la Loge	4	87.740
11	(Republic of Ireland) Cian O'Connor	Rancorrado	4	89.166
12	(United Kingdom) Robert Smith	Vangelis S	4	89.789
13	(Switzerland) Daniel Etter	Peu a Peu	4	89.975
14	(United States) Lauren Hough	Quick Study	4	90.184
15	(Netherlands) Gerco Schröder	Eurocommerce Milano	4	90.510
16	(Republic of Ireland) Cameron Hanley	Southwind VDL	4	90.760
17	(United Kingdom) William Funnell	Billy Birr	4	90.969
18	(Switzerland) Theo Muff	Con Spirito R	4	91.223
19	(Germany) Marcus Ehning	Plot Blue	4	91.554
20	(Germany) Thomas Muehlbauer	Asti Spumante 7	5	94.317
21	(United States) Beezie Madden	Judgement	8	88.578
22	(United States) Rich Fellers	Flexible	8	89.085
23	(Switzerland) Pius Schwizer	Unique X CH	8	89.133
24	(Germany) Holger Wulschner	Clausen	8	89.495
25	(Norway) Morten Djupvik	Bessemeind's Casino	8	90.040
26	(Italy) Emilio Bicocchi	Jeckerson Olea 0003	8	90.458
27	(Canada) Ian Millar	In Style	8	90.805
28	(Germany) Alois Pollmann-Schweckhorst	Lord Luis	9	93.180
29	(Canada) Mario Deslauriers	Paradigm	12	87.600
30	(Italy) Giuseppe D'Onofrio	Landzeu 2	13	95.563
31	(Netherlands) Harrie Smolders	Walnut De Muze	16	90.690
32	(Republic of Ireland) Eddie Macken	Tedechine Sept	17	92.908
33	(Norway) Christian Anfinnsen Oien	Coulthard 2	17	94.811
34	(Canada) Jonathan Asselin	Rayana Chiara	20	104.770
35	(United States) Ashlee Bond	Chivas Z	21	92.210
36	(United States) Alicia Jonsson	Don Francisco	22	96.560
37	(Netherlands) Leon Thijssen	Olaf	26	96.023
38	(Norway) Geir Gulliksen	L'Espoir	Eliminated	
39	(Canada) Jill Henselwood	Black Ice	Retired	

=== Round 2 ===
	Rider	Horse	Round 1		Round 2		Total penalties	Prize $
	Rider	Horse	Penalties	Time (s)	Penalties	Time (s)	Total penalties	Prize $
1	(United Kingdom) Nick Skelton	Arko III	0	89.361	1	81.443	1	$325,000
2	(Belgium) Jos Lansink	Cavalor Cumano	1	93.439	2	83.995	3	$200,000
3	(United States) Richard Spooner	Cristallo	4	85.543	0	75.676	4	$100,000
4	(Mexico) Jaime Azcarraga	Presley Boy	0	87.610	4	74.547	4	
5	(Canada) Eric Lamaze	Hickstead	0	89.447	4	76.994	4	
6	(United Kingdom) Tim Gredley	Omelli	0	90.211	5	79.379	5	
7	(France) Roger-Yves Bost	Ideal de la Loge	4	87.740	4	78.619	8	
8	(United States) Todd Minikus	Pavarotti	0	87.880	8	75.906	8	
9	(United Kingdom) Ben Maher	Robin Hood W	0	91.804	8	78.391	8	
10	(Republic of Ireland) Cian O'Connor	Rancorrado	4	89.166	9	80.647	13	
11	(Italy) Piergiorgio Bucci	Da Zara Porto Rico	0	89.828	20	77.520	20	
12	(United Kingdom) Robert Smith	Vangelis S	4	89.789	18	84.215	22	
