= 2012 FEI World Cup Finals (show jumping and dressage) =

Horse sport competition

The 2012 FEI World Cup Finals in 's-Hertogenbosch were held from April 19 to April 22, 2012. The event served as the final of both the Show jumping and Dressage World Cup series and took place at the Brabanthallen. Due to the proximity of the 2012 Summer Olympics, many riders chose not to compete.

== Overview ==
Each year, the horse show Indoor Brabant is held at the Brabanthallen in 's-Hertogenbosch. World cup competitions in both dressage and show jumping take place at the event. On sever occasions, World Cup Finals have been held as part of Indoor Brabant: 1994 in show jumping, and 1986, 1988, 1990, 1993, 1997, 2000, 2002, 2008 and 2010 in dressage.

The horse show is usually held at the end of March. In 2012, however, the event was postponed to April because of the World Cup Finals.

On April 19, 2012, German dressage team coach Holger Schmezer unexpectedly died in the afternoon in his hotel room. As a sign of mourning, the German dressage riders wore black armbands on their riding jackets during the Grand Prix de Dressage. Following the competition, a minute of silence was observed in his memory.

The loss of Holger Schmezer is a terrible blow to the German Dressage team and to lose such an inspirational coach in an Olympic year is tragic.

— Princess Haya bint Al Hussein, President of the FEI

== Winners ==
=== Dressage Grand Prix ===
On April 20, 2012, at 12:00 noon, the Grand Prix de Dressage was held. It was the first competition of the Dressage World Cup final, but it did not count for the final ranking.

Placing	Rider	Horse	Percentage
1	(Netherlands) Adelinde Cornelissen	Parzival	78.024 %
2	(Germany) Helen Langehanenberg	Damon Hill NRW	76.125 %
3	(Italy) Valentina Truppa	Eremo del Castegno	75.106 %

=== Dressage Grand Prix Freestyle (Final) ===
The second competition of the Dressage World Cup final was the Grand Prix Freestyle, held on the afternoon of Saturday, April 21. Starting as the favourite, Adelinde Cornelissen won the competition with her gelding Parzival scoring 86.250% She successfully defended her title and was crowned World Cup Champion again.

Placing	Rider	Horse	Percentage
1	(Netherlands) Adelinde Cornelissen	Parzival	86.250 %
2	(Germany) Helen Langehanenberg	Damon Hill NRW	85.143 %
3	(Italy) Valentina Truppa	Eremo del Castegno	81.232 %

=== Show jumping final I ===
The first competition of the Show Jumping World Cup Final, a speed and handiness class, was held on Thursday afternoon, April 19, 2012. The results of this competition were converted into faults for the World Cup Final standings.

Placing	Rider	Horse	Time	World Cup Points (only from the World Cup Final)
1	(United States) Rich Fellers	Flexible	60.26 s + 0 penalty s = 60.26	38
2	(Switzerland) Steve Guerdat	Sabrina	61.94 s + 0 penalty s. = 61.94	36
3	(Belgium) Rik Hemeryck	Quarco de Kerambars	62.66 s + 0 penalty s. = 62.66	35

The previous year's final winner, Christian Ahlmann, incurred three obstacle faults in the speed and handiness competition, resulting in a time of 76.09 seconds. Because of this result, he had no chance to defend his title and did not start in the remaining final competitions.

=== Show jumping final II ===
On the afternoon of April 20, the second competition of the Show Jumping World Cup Final was held. It was a show jumping competition with one jump-off. After the second round, the World Cup Points were converted into penalties for Final III.

Placing	Rider	Horse	Round 1		Jump-off		World Cup Points (only from the World Cup Final)
Placing	Rider	Horse	Penalties	Time (s)	Penalties	Time (s)	World Cup Points (only from the World Cup Final)
1	(Germany) Philipp Weishaupt	Monte Bellini	0	-	0	33.04	38
2	(Switzerland) Pius Schwizer	Carlina	0	-	0	33.56	36
3	(Germany) Marco Kutscher	Cornet Obolensky	0	-	0	35.03	35

=== Show jumping final III ===
The third competition of this final was held on April 22, 2012 at 2:00 pm. It consisted of two rounds, neither of which was against the clock. Only the 25 best-placed riders qualified to start in this competition, and in the second round of Final III, only 19 riders completed with their horses.

Placing	Rider	Horse	Round 1	Round 2	Total
Placing	Rider	Horse	Penalties	Penalties	Penalties
1	(Switzerland) Steve Guerdat	Nino des Buissonnets	0	0	0
1	(United States) Rich Fellers	Flexible	0	0	0
3	(Republic of Ireland) Denis Lynch	Abbervail van het Dingeshof	4	0	4
3	(Sweden) Rolf-Göran Bengtsson	Casall	0	4	4
3	(Netherlands) Maikel van der Vleuten	Verdi	0	4	4

=== Show jumping final standings ===
The decision for the title of World Cup Champion 2011-2012 was made in a jump-off. Two riders, Steve Guerdat of Switzerland and Rich Fellers of the US, each had only one panelty point after four rounds across three competitions in this World Cup Final.

Steve Guerdat was the first to start in the jump-off with his gelding Nino des Buissonnets. He rode very fast and finished with a time of 26.61 seconds. Rich Fellers followed with his horse Flexible. For most of the jump off his time was almost the same as Guerdat’s, but in one turn Fellers rode much faster and finished 0.64 seconds ahead of Guerdat.

With this victory Rich Fellers became the first rider from the United States to win the Show jumping World Cup in 25 years. The previous American winner was Katharine Burdsall in 1987.

Placing	Rider	Horse
1	(United States) Rich Fellers	Flexible
2	(Switzerland) Steve Guerdat	Nino des Buissonnets
3	(Switzerland) Pius Schwizer	Ulysse and Carlina

=== Show jumping Grand Prix (CSI 3*) ===
Also a CSI 3 star event was held at the “Indoor Brabant“ 2012. The Grand Prix of this show jumping event took place on Saturday, April 21, 2012 at 9:30 pm. It was a show jumping competition with one jump-off and fences up to 1.55 meters. The competition was endowed with €100.000, and was sponsored by Rabobank.

Placing	Rider	Horse	Round 1		Jump-off	
Placing	Rider	Horse	Penalties	Time (s)	Penalties	Time (s)
1	(Netherlands) Marc Houtzager	Opium	0	-	0	29.18
2	(Qatar) Ali bin Khaled Al Thani	Casanova	0	-	0	29.30
3	(United States) Richard Spooner	Apache	0	-	0	30.03
