= FEI World Cup Jumping 2011/2012 =

Show jumping competition

The FEI World Cup Jumping 2011/2012 is the 34th edition of the premier international show jumping competition run by the FEI. The final was held at the 's-Hertogenbosch, Netherlands from April 18 to April 22, 2012. Christian Ahlmann of Germany was the defending champion, having won the 2011 final in Leipzig, Germany.

This was the first Chinese League. In the Japan League the horse show in Minamisōma was replaced by a horse show in Mito as a result of the Fukushima Daiichi nuclear disaster.

== Arab League ==
Location	Dates	Event	World Cup competition		Source
Location	Dates	Event	Prize money	Winner	Source
Tétouan, Morocco	October 7, 2011 – October 9, 2011	CSI***-W	€36,000	(France) Jean Marc Nicolas on Oxford d'Esquelmes	
Rabat, Morocco	October 14, 2011 – October 16, 2011	CSI***-W	€38,000	(United States) Katie Prudent Monahan on V	
El Jadida, Morocco	October 21, 2011 – October 23, 2011	CSI***-W	€40,000	(Belgium) Francois Mathy Jr. on Polinska des Isles	
Damascus, Syria	November 1, 2011 – November 4, 2011	CSIO***-W	cancelled		
Amman, Jordan	November 10, 2011 – November 12, 2011	CSI*-W	8,000 US$	(Egypt) Sameh El Dahan on To The Point	
Amman, Jordan	November 17, 2011 – November 19, 2011	CSI*-W	8,000 US$	(Egypt) Sameh Hesham Hatab on Butter Scotich	
Riyadh, Saudi Arabia	November 30, 2011 – December 2, 2011	CSI***-W	38,000 US$	(Saudi Arabia) Khaled Abdulaziz Al Eid on Vanhoeve	
Doha, Qatar	December 27, 2011 – December 30, 2011	CSI****-W	190,000 QAR	(Egypt) Karim El Zoghby on Jument Dufee	
Dubai, United Arab Emirates	January 5, 2012 – January 7, 2012	CSI***-W	170,000 AED	(Saudi Arabia) Abdullah Al Sharbatly on Larkhill Cruiser	
Abu Dhabi, United Arab Emirates	January 12, 2012 – January 14, 2012	CSI***-W	300,000 AED	(Saudi Arabia) Khaled Abdulaziz Al Eid on Vanhoeve	
Sharjah, United Arab Emirates	January 26, 2012 – January 28, 2012	CSI***-W	250,000 AED	(United Arab Emirates) Mohammed Ahmed Al Owais on Tolita	
Al Ain, United Arab Emirates	February 9, 2012 – February 11, 2012	CSI****-W	230,000 AED	(Saudi Arabia) Khaled Abdulaziz Al Eid on Vanhoeve	

== Caucasian League ==
Location	Dates	Event	World Cup competition		Source
Location	Dates	Event	Prize money	Winner	Source
Baku, Azerbaijan	May 11, 2011 – May 14, 2011	CSI***-W	78,000 US$	(Azerbaijan) Gennadiy Gashiboyazov on Papirus	
(Georgia (country)) Tbilisi, Georgia	May 23, 2011 – May 26, 2011	CSI**-W	20,100 US$	(Poland) Aleksandra Lusina on Kalinka MNM	
(Georgia (country)) Tbilisi, Georgia	September 29, 2011 – October 2, 2011	CSI**-W	20,000 US$	(Poland) Aleksandra Lusina on Kalinka MNM	
Baku, Azerbaijan	October 28, 2011 – October 31, 2011	CSI***-W	78,000 US$	(Azerbaijan) Jamal Rahimov on Platin E	
Baku, Azerbaijan	November 11, 2011 – November 14, 2011	CSI***-W	cancelled		
Baku, Azerbaijan	December 1, 2011 – December 4, 2011	CSI***-W	cancelled		
Baku, Azerbaijan	December 28, 2011 – December 31, 2011	CSI***-W	140,000 US$	(Poland) Aleksandra Lusina on Kalinka MNM	
Baku, Azerbaijan	January 12, 2012 – January 15, 2012	CSI**-W	93,000 US$	(Poland) Aleksandra Lusina on Kalinka MNM	
Baku, Azerbaijan	February 23, 2012 – February 26, 2012	CSI***-W	cancelled		

== Central Asian League ==
Location	Dates	Event	World Cup competition		Source
Location	Dates	Event	Prize money	Winner	Source
Tashkent, Uzbekistan	April 8, 2011 – April 10, 2011	CSIO*-W	1,500 US$	(Kyrgyzstan) Myrza Toktobekov on Stamberline	
Bishkek, Kyrgyzstan	May 19, 2011 – May 22, 2011	CSIO*-W	1,920 US$	(Kazakhstan) Talyat Islamov on Atom	
Astana, Kazakhstan	July 2, 2011 – July 5, 2011	CSIO*-W	200,000 KZT	(Kazakhstan) Peter Solovjov on Liebestraum Z	

== Central European League ==
=== North Sub-League ===
Location	Dates	Event	World Cup competition		Source
Location	Dates	Event	Prize money	Winner	Source
Otrada, Otradnoye District, Moscow, Russia	June 17, 2011 – June 19, 2011	CSI**-W	30,000 CHF	(Russia) Vladimir Tuganov on Carvin	
Ruila, Estonia	July 7, 2011 – July 10, 2011	CSI**-W	€23,000	(Estonia) Tiit Kivisild on Calina	
Derby Club, St. Petersburg, Russia	July 15, 2011 – July 17, 2011	CSI***-W	€27,000	(Estonia) Gunnar Klettenberg on Bingo	
Riga, Latvia	July 22, 2011 – July 24, 2011	CSI**-W	€23,000	(Russia) Vladimir Beletsky on Rocketman	
Ratomka, Minsk, Belarus	July 28, 2011 – July 31, 2011	CSIO**-W	€25,000	(Lithuania) Benas Gutkauskas on Lascar	
Bratislava, Slovakia	August 11, 2011 – August 14, 2011	CSIO***-W	€27,000	(Switzerland) Steve Guerdat on Ferrari	
Vazgaikiemis, Lithuania	August 19, 2011 – August 21, 2011	CSI**-W	75,700 LTL	(Estonia) Tiit Kivisild on Torrero	
Zhashkiv, Ukraine	August 26, 2011 – August 28, 2011	CSI**-W	cancelled		
Pezinok, Slovakia	September 1, 2011 – September 4, 2011	CSI***-W	€25,000	(Slovakia) Monika Noskovicova on Sclintura	
Prague, Czech Republic	September 8, 2011 – September 11, 2011	CSIO***-W	cancelled		
Siemens Arena, Vilnius, Lithuania	September 30, 2011 – October 2, 2011	CSI**-W	cancelled		
Tallinn, Estonia	October 7, 2011 – October 9, 2011	CSI**-W	€25,000	(Russia) Anna Gromzina on Pimlico	
Leszno, Poland	November 10, 2011 – November 13, 2011	CSI***-W	€24,000	(Switzerland) Niklaus Rutschi on Casablanca	
Poznań, Poland	December 9, 2011 – December 11, 2011	CSI***-W	110,000 PLN	(Germany) Jörne Sprehe on Contifax	

=== South Sub-League ===
Location	Dates	Event	World Cup competition		Source
Location	Dates	Event	Prize money	Winner	Source
Lipica, Slovenia	May 20, 2011 – May 22, 2011	CSI**-W	€20,000	(Bulgaria) Valentin Valkov on Billy King	
Bozhurishte, Bulgaria	June 2, 2011 – June 5, 2011	CSIO**-W	€23,000	(Bulgaria) Kalin Nedeltchev on C'est mon amie	
Markopoulo Olympic Equestrian Centre, Greece	June 9, 2011 – June 12, 2011	CSIO**-W	€23,000	(Greece) Hannah Roberson-Mytilinaiou on Equitta	
Celje, Slovenia	November 25, 2011 – November 27, 2011	CSI**-W	€20,000	(Ukraine) Björn Nagel on Quickdiamond	
Budapest, Hungary	December 2, 2011 – December 4, 2011	CSI**-W	€30,000	(Ukraine) Björn Nagel on Quickdiamond	

=== Final ===
Location	Dates	Event	World Cup competition		Source
Location	Dates	Event	Prize money	Winner	Source
Warsaw, Poland	March 22, 2012 – March 25, 2012	CSI-W League Final	115,000 PLN	(Lithuania) Benas Gutkauskas on Lascar	

== Chinese League ==
Location	Dates	Event	World Cup competition winner	Source
Beijing International Equestrian Center, Beijing, P. R. of China	August 27, 2011 – August 28, 2011	CSI*-W	(Hong Kong) Samantha Lam on Double Bent	
Beijing International Equestrian Center, Beijing, P. R. of China	September 24, 2011 – September 25, 2011	CSI*-W	(China) Liu Tongyan on Kubuqi	
National Stadium for Performance and Art, Beijing, P. R. of China	October 15, 2011 – October 16, 2011	CSI*-W	(China) Huang Zuping on Sambuca	

== Japan League ==
Location	Dates	Event	World Cup competition winner	Source
Osaka, Japan	April 2, 2011	CSI*-W	(Japan) Koki Saito on Telexio	
Gotemba, Japan	May 15, 2011	CSI*-W	(Japan) Yuya Ninomiya on Willem	
Chiba, Japan	May 28, 2011	CSI*-W	(Japan) Yuya Ninomiya on Willem	
Nasu, Japan	June 5, 2011	CSI*-W	(Japan) Yuya Ninomiya on Willem	
Osaka, Japan	June 19, 2011	CSI*-W	(Japan) Yuya Ninomiya on Willem	
Mito, Japan (planned: Minamisōma)	August 3, 2011	CSI*-W	(Japan) Shino Hirota on Yamato	
Fuji, Japan	September 4, 2011	CSI*-W	(Japan) Tadayoshi Hayashi on Carry's Son	
Osaka, Japan	October 22, 2011	CSI*-W	(Japan) Ryuma Hirota on Yamahiro	
Tsumagoi, Kakegawa, Shizuoka, Japan (League Final)	December 11, 2011	CSI*-W	(Japan) Hiroaki Ikeda on Lapin de Neige	

== North American League ==
=== East Coast ===
Location	Dates	Event	World Cup competition		Source
Location	Dates	Event	Prize money	Winner	Source
Blainville, Quebec, Canada	July 13, 2011 – July 17, 2011	CSI**-W	Can$60,000	(Canada) Hugh Graham on Executive Privilege 3E	
Bromont, Quebec, Canada	July 20, 2011 – July 24, 2011	CSI**-W	Can$65,000	(Canada) Jill Henselwood on George	
Bridgehampton, New York, United States (Hampton Classic Horse Show)	August 28, 2011 – September 4, 2011	CSI****-W	250,000 US$	(United States) McLain Ward on Antares F	
Moreland Hills, Ohio, United States	September 14, 2011 – September 18, 2011	CSI**-W	cancelled		
Lexington, Kentucky, United States	September 22, 2011 – September 24, 2011	CSI**-W	US$50,000	(United States) McLain Ward on Pjotter van de Zonnehoeve	
Harrisburg, Pennsylvania, United States	October 19, 2011 – October 22, 2011	CSI**-W	US$75,000	(United States) Margie Goldstein-Engle on Indigo	
Washington, D.C., United States	October 25, 2011 – October 30, 2011	CSI***-W	100,000 US$	(United Kingdom) Nick Skelton on Carlo	
Lexington, Kentucky, United States (National Horse Show)	November 2, 2011 – November 6, 2011	CSI****-W	250,000 US$	(United States) Richard Spooner on Cristallo	
Toronto, Ontario, Canada	November 8, 2011 – November 12, 2011	CSI****-W	100,000 US$	(United Kingdom) Scott Brash on Bon Ami	
Wellington, Florida, United States	November 29, 2011 – December 4, 2011	CSI**-W	50,000 US$	(United States) Margie Goldstein-Engle on Indigo	
Green Cove Springs, Florida, United States	January 12, 2012 – January 14, 2012	CSI**-W	cancelled		
Wellington, Florida, United States	February 8, 2012 – February 12, 2012	CSI***-W	125,000 US$	(United States) Margie Goldstein-Engle on Indigo	
(United States) Wellington, Florida, USA	March 7, 2012 – March 11, 2012	CSI***-W	200,000 US$	(United Kingdom) Scott Brash on Sanctos van het Gravenhof	
Tampa, Florida, United States	March 28, 2012 – April 1, 2012	CSI**-W	50,000 US$	(United States) Beezie Madden on Mademoiselle	

=== West Coast ===
Location	Dates	Event	World Cup competition		Source
Location	Dates	Event	Prize money	Winner	Source
Langley, British Columbia, Canada	June 1, 2011 – June 5, 2011	CSI**-W	Can$55,000	(Canada) Jill Henselwood on Special Ed	
Spruce Meadows, Calgary, Alberta, Canada	June 16, 2011 – June 19, 2011	CSI****-W	Can$125,000	(United States) Kyle King on Capone I	
Spruce Meadows, Calgary, Alberta, Canada	June 30, 2011 – July 3, 2011	CSI****-W	Can$65,000	(United States) Rich Fellers on Flexible	
Langley, British Columbia, Canada	August 24, 2011 – August 28, 2011	CSI**-W	Can$100,000	(United States) Richard Spooner on Cristallo	
Del Mar, California, United States	August 31, 2011 – September 3, 2011	CSI**-W	50,000 US$	(Australia) Harley Brown on Cassiato	
Spruce Meadows, Calgary, Alberta, Canada	September 1, 2011 – September 4, 2011	CSI**-W	Can$78,000	(Saudi Arabia) Khaled Abdulaziz Al-Eid on Presley Boy	
San Juan Capistrano, California, United States	September 13, 2011 – September 16, 2011	CSI**-W	50,000 US$	(United States) Kirsten Coe on Baronez	
Burbank, California, United States	September 21, 2011 – September 25, 2011	CSI**-W	50,000 US$	(United States) Saer Coulter on Springtime	
Balvanera Polo & Golf Club, Corregidora, Mexico	September 22, 2011 – September 25, 2011	CSI**-W	cancelled		
Del Mar, California, United States	September 28, 2011 – October 2, 2011	CSI**-W	50,000 US$	(United Kingdom) Helen McNaught on Lariccello	
Club Hipico Coapexpan, Xalapa-Enríquez, Mexico	October 5, 2011 – October 9, 2011	CSI***-W	cancelled		
Las Vegas, Nevada, United States	November 2, 2011 – November 5, 2011	CSI**-W	50,000 US$	(Brazil) Eduardo Menezes on Calavda	
Rancho Murieta, California, United States	November 9, 2011 – November 13, 2011	CSI**-W	50,000 US$	(United States) Rich Fellers on Flexible	
Burbank, California, United States	November 16, 2011 – November 20, 2011	CSI**-W	50,000 US$	(United States) Rich Fellers on Flexible	
Thermal, California, United States	January 31, 2012 – February 5, 2012	CSI**-W	53,000 US$	(United States) Francie Steinwedell-Carvin on Taunus	
(United States) Thermal, California, USA	February 7, 2012 – February 12, 2012	CSI**-W	53,000 US$	(New Zealand) Duncan McFarlane on Mr. Whoopy	
(United States) Thermal, California, USA	February 21, 2012 – February 26, 2012	CSI**-W	53,000 US$	(United States) Michelle Spadone on Uitteraard	
(United States) Thermal, California, USA	February 28, 2012 – March 4, 2012	CSI**-W	cancelled		

== Pacific League ==
=== Australia ===
Location	Dates	Event	World Cup competition		Source
Location	Dates	Event	Prize money	Winner	Source
Sydney, Australia (Sydney Royal Easter Show)	April 20, 2011	CSI*-W	10,500 A$	(Australia) Julia Hargreaves on Vedor	
Sydney, Australia	May 8, 2011	CSI*-W	5,400 A$	(Australia) Catherine Green on Da Vinci's Pride	
Toowoomba, Australia	August 7, 2011	CSI*-W	7,500 A$	(Australia) Jamie Kermond on Colthaga	
Brisbane, Australia	August 17, 2011	CSI*-W	6,500 A$	(Australia) Jamie Kermond on Valhalla	
Caboolture, Australia	August 21, 2011	CSI*-W	5,000 A$	(Australia) Tim Amitrano on Mr Innocent	
Gawler, Australia	August 28, 2011	CSI*-W	5,390 A$	(Australia) Thomas McDermott on Statford Delight	
Adelaide, Australia (Royal Adelaide Show)	September 9, 2011	CSI*-W	8,000 A$	(Australia) Tim Clarke on Caltango	
Melbourne, Australia (Royal Melbourne Show)	October 2, 2011	CSI*-W	6,150 A$	(Australia) Jamie Kermond on Valhalla	
Shepparton, Australia	November 12, 2011	CSI*-W	5,050 A$	(Australia) Clem Smith on Dark Ages	
Wodonga, Australia	November 19, 2011	CSI*-W	6,900 A$	(Australia) Sheridan Manuel on Renmarno	
Sale, Australia	November 27, 2011	CSI*-W	5,000 A$	(Australia) Chris Chugg on Alondra	
Tonimbuk, Australia	December 3, 2011	CSI*-W	5,440 A$	(Australia) Hilary Scott on Oaks Miss Scarlet	
Sydney, Australia	December 11, 2011	CSI*-W	10,000 A$	(Australia) Billy Raymont on Ocean Beach NZPH	
Dapto, Australia	January 14, 2012	CSI*-W	cancelled		

=== New Zealand ===
Location	Dates	Event	World Cup competition		Source
Location	Dates	Event	Prize money	Winner	Source
Hastings, New Zealand	October 19, 2011 – October 21, 2011	CSI*-W	3,000 NZD	(New Zealand) Maurice Beatson on My Gollywog	
Kihikihi, New Zealand	November 4, 2011 – November 6, 2011	CSI*-W	4,650 NZD	(New Zealand) Lisa Coupe on My Ocean Wave	
Feilding, New Zealand	December 2, 2011 – December 4, 2011	CSI*-W	3,080 NZD	(New Zealand) Katie McVean on Daffodil	
Taupō, New Zealand	December 15, 2011 – December 18, 2011	CSI*-W	3,130 NZD	(New Zealand) Katie McVean on Daffodil	
Dannevirke, New Zealand	January 7, 2012 – January 8, 2012	CSI*-W	competition cancelled because of bad weather		
Waitemata City, New Zealand	January 14, 2012 – January 15, 2012	CSI*-W	3,100 NZD	(New Zealand) Katie McVean on Daffodil	
Tauranga, New Zealand (League Final)	February 2, 2012 – February 5, 2012	CSI*-W	3,100 NZD	(New Zealand) Lisa Coupe on Amaretto MVNZ	

== South African League ==
Location	Dates	Event	World Cup competition		Source
Location	Dates	Event	Prize money	Winner	Source
Midrand, South Africa	May 14, 2011 – May 15, 2011	CSI*-W	20,000 ZAR	(South Africa) Lara Neill on Something Special	
Karkloof Forest, South Africa	May 26, 2011 – May 30, 2011	CSI*-W	cancelled		
Shongweni, Assagay, South Africa	June 16, 2011 – June 19, 2011	CSI*-W	41,000 ZAR	(South Africa) Lorette Knowles-Taylor on Watch me P	
Port Elizabeth, South Africa	July 15, 2011 – July 17, 2011	CSI*-W	20,000 ZAR	(South Africa) Jade Hooke on A new era	
Durban, South Africa	August 4, 2011 – August 9, 2011	CSI*-W	29,700 ZAR	(South Africa) Barry Taylor on Nabab Forever	
Pretoria, South Africa	August 26, 2011 – August 28, 2011	CSI*-W	15,000 ZAR	(South Africa) Michelle Stafford on Lord Larrymore	
Polokwane, South Africa	August 31, 2011 – September 4, 2011	CSI*-W	95,000 ZAR	(South Africa) Jade Hooke on A new era	
Cape Town, South Africa	November 17, 2011 – November 20, 2011	CSI*-W	cancelled		

== South American League ==
Location	Dates	Event	World Cup competition		Source
Location	Dates	Event	Prize money	Winner	Source
Porto Alegre, Brazil	May 5, 2011 – May 8, 2011	CSI***-W	84,000 BRL	(Brazil) José Luiz Guimaraes de Carvalho on Arriminum TW	
Buenos Aires (Sol de Mayo), Argentina	May 26, 2011 – May 29, 2011	CSI*-W	6,450 US$	(Uruguay) Marcelo Chirico Ferreira on Omanie du Landais	
São Paulo, Brazil	September 16, 2011 – September 18, 2011	CSI**-W	161,500 BRL	(Brazil) Pedro Junqueira Muylaert on Ducati SE	
São Paulo, Brazil	September 29, 2011 – October 2, 2011	CSI**-W	62,400 BRL	(Brazil) Felipe Juares de Lima on Zuleika Metodo	
Rio de Janeiro, Brazil	November 10, 2011 – November 13, 2011	CSI**-W	81,200 BRL	(Brazil) Artemus de Almeida on Sharapova MCJ	
Haras El Capricho, Capilla del Señor, Argentina	November 23, 2011 – November 27, 2011	CSIO****-W	37,800 US$	(United States) Charie Jacobs on Leap of Joy	

== South East Asia League ==
Location	Dates	Event	World Cup competition		Source
Location	Dates	Event	Prize money	Winner	Source
Kuang, Malaysia	September 8, 2011 – September 11, 2011	CSI*-W	12,000 MYR	(Thailand) Akkara Konglapamnauy on Celine 80	
Kuang, Malaysia	October 6, 2011 – October 9, 2011	CSI*-W	12,000 MYR	(Malaysia) Qabil Ambak Dato' Mahamad Fathil on 3Q Coulthard	
Kuang, Malaysia	October 20, 2011 – October 23, 2011	CSI*-W	12,000 MYR	(Thailand) Akkara Konglapamnauy on Celine 80	

== Western European League ==
Location	Dates	Event	World Cup competition winner
Oslo, Norway	October 12, 2011 – October 16, 2011	CSI*****-W	(Switzerland) Pius Schwizer on Carlina
Helsinki, Finland	October 20, 2011 – October 23, 2011	CSI*****-W	(Switzerland) Pius Schwizer on Carlina
Lyon, France	October 26, 2011 – October 30, 2011	CSI*****-W	(Sweden) Rolf-Göran Bengtsson on Casall
Verona, Italy	November 3, 2011 – November 6, 2011	CSI*****-W	competition stopped (death of Hickstead)
Stuttgart, Germany	November 16, 2011 – November 20, 2011	CSI*****-W	(Germany) Ludger Beerbaum on Gotha FRH
Le Grand-Saconnex near Geneva, Switzerland	December 8, 2011 – December 11, 2011	CSI*****-W	(Brazil) Álvaro de Miranda Neto on Ashleigh Drossel Dan
London, United Kingdom (Olympia International Horse Show)	December 13, 2011 – December 19, 2011	CSI*****-W	(United Kingdom) Ben Maher on Tripple X III
Mechelen, Belgium	December 26, 2011 – December 30, 2011	CSI*****-W	(Belgium) Grégory Wathelet on Copin van de Broy
Leipzig, Germany	January 19, 2012 – January 22, 2012	CSI*****-W	(Germany) Christian Ahlmann on Taloubet Z
Zurich, Switzerland	January 27, 2012 – January 29, 2012	CSI*****-W	(Germany) Marco Kutscher on Cornet Obolensky
Bordeaux, France	February 3, 2012 – February 5, 2012	CSI*****-W	(France) Kevin Staut on Silvana
Vigo, Spain	February 9, 2012 – February 12, 2012	CSI*****-W	cancelled
Gothenburg, Sweden	February 23, 2012 – February 26, 2012	CSI*****-W	(Germany) Marco Kutscher on Satisfaction FRH

== World Cup Final ==
Location	Dates	Event	Winner
's-Hertogenbosch, Netherlands	April 18, 2012 – April 22, 2012	CSI-W Final	(United States) Rich Fellers on Flexible
