= 2008 FEI World Cup Jumping final =

Horse sport competition

The 2008 FEI World Cup Jumping Final was the 30th final of the FEI World Cup Jumping show jumping series. It was held at the Scandinavium in Gothenburg, Sweden from April 24 to April 27, 2008 for the twelfth time during the 2008 Göteborg Horse Show. Meredith Michaels-Beerbaum of Germany won the event riding Shutterfly.

== Results ==
=== Round 1 ===
Thirty-nine riders competed in the Table C €110,000 opening round of the 2008 FEI World Cup Jumping Final. Michael Whitaker opened the round, and quickly set the pace by completing a clear round in 75.05 seconds. However, his time was quickly surpassed two riders later when Malin Baryard-Johnsson took nearly four seconds off of Whitaker's time while representing the host nation of Sweden. Shortly after Peter Wylde narrowly took the lead from Baryard-Johnsson, Heinrich-Hermann Engemann cleared the course in under seventy seconds to set a new standard. Although Steve Guerdat was also able to clear the seventy second mark, Engemann's time held up as he took the €25,300 first place prize. Two-time champion Marcus Ehning was eliminated after his horse refused twice at the eleventh jump.

| | Rider | Horse | Time (s) | Penalties | Points |
|---|---|---|---|---|---|
| 1 | (Germany) Heinrich-Hermann Engemann | Aboyeur W | 68.73 | 0 | 40 |
| 2 | (Switzerland) Steve Guerdat | Tresov V | 69.88 | 0 | 38 |
| 3 | (Republic of Ireland) Jessica Kürten | Castle Forbes Libertina | 70.31 | 0 | 37 |

=== Round 2 ===
Thirty-eight riders returned for the Table A €110,000 second round of the 2008 FEI World Cup Jumping Final, except for Marcus Ehning who was eliminated in the first round. Five riders went clear and competed in a jump-off round: Jessica Kürten, Peter Wylde, Ludger Beerbaum, Rich Fellers, and Michael Whitaker.

| | Rider | Horse | Time (s) | Penalties | Points |
|---|---|---|---|---|---|
| 1 | (Republic of Ireland) Jessica Kürten | Castle Forbes Libertina | 36.91 | 0 | 40 |
| 2 | (United States) Peter Wylde | Esplanade 7 | 37.21 | 0 | 38 |
| 3 | (Germany) Ludger Beerbaum | All Inclusive | 40.25 | 0 | 37 |
