= FEI World Cup Jumping 2010/2011 =

The FEI World Cup Jumping 2010/2011 was the 33rd edition of the premier international show jumping competition run by the FEI. The final was held at the Leipzig Trade Fair in Leipzig, Germany, from April 27, 2011, to May 1, 2011. Marcus Ehning of Germany was the defending champion, having won the final the previous year (2009/10) in Le Grand-Saconnex near Geneva, Switzerland.

== Arab League ==
Location	Dates	Event	Winner
Tripoli, Libya	September 17, 2010 – September 20, 2010	CSI**-W	cancelled
Sharm el Sheikh, Egypt	September 30, 2010 – October 3, 2010	CSI**-W	(Egypt) Yehia Wageeh Atallah on Parabel's Flash Bounce
Sharm el Sheikh, Egypt	October 7, 2010 – October 10, 2010	CSI**-W	(Egypt) Ahmed Alaa Ragab on Favorit
Faqra, Lebanon	October 22, 2010 – October 25, 2010	CSI**-W	cancelled
Damascus, Syria	October 22, 2010 – October 25, 2010	CSI**-W	cancelled
Damascus, Syria	October 29, 2010 – November 2, 2010	CSIO***-W	cancelled
Kuwait, Kuwait	November 26, 2010 – November 29, 2010	CSI**-W	cancelled
Riyadh, Saudi Arabia	December 9, 2010 – December 11, 2010	CSI***-W	(Saudi Arabia) Khaled Abdulaziz Al-Eid on Jalla de Gaverie
Al-Budayyi', Bahrain	December 9, 2010 – December 11, 2010	CSI**-W	cancelled
Doha, Qatar	December 20, 2010 – December 23, 2010	CSI****-W	(United Arab Emirates) Mohammed Ahmed Al Owais on Tolita
Dubai, United Arab Emirates	January 6, 2011 – January 8, 2011	CSI***-W	(Saudi Arabia) Abdullah Al-Sharbatly on Columbia
Abu Dhabi, United Arab Emirates	January 13, 2011 – January 15, 2011	CSI****-W	(Saudi Arabia) Abdullah Al-Sharbatly on Columbia
Sharjah, United Arab Emirates	January 20, 2011 – January 22, 2011	CSI**-W	(Syria) Ahmad Saber Hamcho on Wonderboy III
Al Ain, United Arab Emirates	February 3, 2011 – February 6, 2011	CSI****-W	(United Arab Emirates) Mohammed Ghanem Al Hajri on Shakira

== Caucasian League ==
Location	Dates	Event	Winner
Baku, Azerbaijan	May 5, 2010 – May 8, 2010	CSI**-W	(Russia) Natalia Simonia on Gardemarin
(Georgia (country)) Tbilisi, Georgia	May 23, 2010 – May 26, 2010	CSI**-W	(United Kingdom) Christopher Frazer on Kalinka MNM
(Georgia (country)) Tbilisi, Georgia	September 9, 2010 – September 12, 2010	CSI**-W	(Georgia (country)) Kakhaber Kikiani on Omut
Baku, Azerbaijan	January 13, 2011 – January 16, 2011	CSI***-W	(Bulgaria) Veneto Tenev on Uterusa
Baku, Azerbaijan	February 3, 2011 – February 6, 2011	CSI**-W	(Azerbaijan) Jamal Rahimov on Topic van't Voorhof
Baku, Azerbaijan	March 9, 2011 – March 12, 2011	CSI**-W	(Azerbaijan) Jamal Rahimov on Platin E

== Central Asian League ==
Location	Dates	Event	Winner
Tashkent, Uzbekistan	April 22, 2010 – April 25, 2010	CSIO*-W	(Uzbekistan) Davron Gafurov on Amirhan
Bishkek, Kyrgyzstan	May 28, 2010 – May 30, 2010	CSIO*-W	(Kyrgyzstan) Andrei Shalohin on Charlize
Astana, Kazakhstan	July 2, 2010 – July 4, 2010	CSIO*-W	(Kyrgyzstan) Andrei Shalohin on Charlize

== Central European League ==
=== North Sub-League ===
Location	Dates	Event	Winner
Donetsk, Ukraine	May 21, 2010 – May 23, 2010	CSI***-W	(Germany) Thomas Voss on Carinjo
Otrada, Otradnoye District, Moscow, Russia	June 18, 2010 – June 20, 2010	CSI**-W	(Lithuania) Benas Gutkauskas on Quick-Jet
Riga, Latvia	July 17, 2010 – July 19, 2010	CSI**-W	(Latvia) Andis Varna on Grand Libero
Derby Club, St. Petersburg, Russia	July 16, 2010 – July 18, 2010	CSI***-W	(Estonia) Gunnar Klettenberg on Bingo
Bratislava, Slovakia	August 5, 2010 – August 8, 2010	CSIO***-W	(Germany) Tim Hoster on Rastellie
Vazgaikiemis, Lithuania	August 20, 2010 – August 22, 2010	CSI**-W	(Lithuania) Benas Gutkauskas on Tom Riddle S
Poděbrady, Czech Republic	September 9, 2010 – September 12, 2010	CSIO***-W	cancelled
Leszno, Poland	November 11, 2010 – November 14, 2010	CSI***-W	(Sweden) Jannike West on Vivaldi K
Poznań, Poland	December 10, 2010 – December 12, 2010	CSI**-W	(Estonia) Rein Pill on Virgin Express
Brno, Czech Republic	February 17, 2011 – February 20, 2011	CSI***-W	cancelled

=== South Sub-League ===
Location	Dates	Event	Winner
Markopoulo Olympic Equestrian Centre, Greece	May 13, 2010 – May 16, 2010	CSIO**-W	(Italy) Lucia Vizzini on Prinzess to Heart
Lipica, Slovenia	June 4, 2010 – June 6, 2010	CSI**-W	(Bermuda) Patrick Nisbett on Cantaro
Istanbul, Turkey	June 11, 2010 – June 13, 2010	CSIO***-W	(Italy) Giovanni Oberti on Caribo Z
Sofia, Bulgaria	June 17, 2010 – June 20, 2010	CSIO**-W	(Greece) Avgerinos Linardos on Tyson
Piatra Neamţ, Romania	June 25, 2010 – June 27, 2010	CSI**-W	cancelled
Câmpina, Romania	September 10, 2010 – September 12, 2010	CSIO***-W	cancelled
Celje, Slovenia	November 26, 2010 – November 28, 2010	CSI**-W	(Italy) Juan Carlos García on Hilton Highlight
Budapest, Hungary	December 3, 2010 – December 5, 2010	CSI**-W	(Italy) Jerry Smit on Luis della Caccia

=== Final ===
Location	Dates	Event	Winner
Warsaw, Poland	March 25, 2011 – March 27, 2011	CSI-W League Final	(Poland) Msciwoj Kiecon on Urbane

== Japan League ==
Location	Dates	Event	Winner
Osaka, Japan	April 3, 2010	CSI*-W	(Japan) Hidehiko Tsukuda on Sjoerd
Chiba, Japan	May 15, 2010	CSI*-W	(Japan) Shinichi Taniguchi on Speculation
Nasu, Japan	June 6, 2010	CSI*-W	(Japan) Daisuke Kawaguchi on Kronos
Osaka, Japan	June 20, 2010	CSI*-W	(Japan) Daisuke Kawaguchi on Kronos
Minamisōma, Japan	July 4, 2010	CSI*-W	(Japan) Daisuke Kawaguchi on Kronos
Fuji, Japan	September 4, 2010	CSI*-W	(Japan) Daisuke Kawaguchi on Kronos
Gotemba, Japan	October 10, 2010	CSI*-W	(Japan) Kazuteru Kitai on Carlos
Osaka, Japan	October 23, 2010	CSI*-W	(Japan) Hiroaki Ogawa on Arizona
Tsumagoi, Kakegawa, Shizuoka, Japan (League Final)	November 6, 2010	CSI*-W	(Japan) Tadahiro Hayashi on Ranashun

== North American League ==
=== East Coast ===
Location	Dates	Event	Winner
Blainville, Quebec, Canada	July 14, 2010 – July 18, 2010	CSI**-W	(Canada) Francois Lamontagne on Anton
Bromont, Quebec, Canada	July 21, 2010 – July 25, 2010	CSI**-W	(Canada) Yann Candele on Game Ready
Lexington, Kentucky, United States	August 18, 2010 – August 22, 2010	CSI**-W	(United States) Lauren Crooks on Cincinnati
Bridgehampton, New York, United States (Hampton Classic Horse Show)	August 29, 2010 – September 5, 2010	CSI****-W	(United States) McLain Ward on Sapphire
Halton Hills, Ontario, Canada	September 1, 2010 – September 5, 2010	CSI**-W	cancelled
Saugerties, New York, United States	September 8, 2010 – September 12, 2010	CSI**-W	(United States) McLain Ward on Rothchild
Moreland Hills, Ohio, United States	September 15, 2010 – September 19, 2010	CSI**-W	(United States) Beezie Madden on Coral Reef Via Volo
Caledon, Ontario, Canada	September 22, 2010 – September 26, 2010	CSI**-W	cancelled
Harrisburg, Pennsylvania, United States	October 21, 2010 – October 23, 2010	CSI**-W	(Brazil) Rodrigo Pessoa on Ashley
Washington, D.C., United States	October 26, 2010 – October 31, 2010	CSI***-W	(United States) McLain Ward on Sapphire
Syracuse, New York, United States	November 3, 2010 – November 7, 2010	CSI***-W	(United States) Margie Goldstein-Engle on Indigo
Toronto, Ontario, Canada	November 8, 2010 – November 13, 2010	CSI****-W	(United States) Brianne Goutal on Ballade van het Indihoff
Wellington, Florida, United States	November 30, 2010 – December 5, 2010	CSI**-W	(Brazil) Paulo Santana on Taloubet
Green Cove Springs, Florida, United States	January 14, 2011 – January 15, 2011	CSI**-W	(Brazil) Rodrigo Pessoa on Let's Fly
Wellington, Florida, United States	February 9, 2011 – February 13, 2011	CSI***-W	(United States) Laura Kraut on Cedric
Wellington, Florida, United States	March 9, 2011 – March 13, 2011	CSI****-W	(Brazil) Rodrigo Pessoa on Let's Fly
Tampa, Florida, United States	March 30, 2011 – April 4, 2011	CSI**-W	cancelled

=== West Coast ===
Location	Dates	Event	Winner
Langley, British Columbia, Canada	June 2, 2010 – June 6, 2010	CSI**-W	(United States) Rich Fellers on Flexible
Spruce Meadows, Calgary, Alberta, Canada	June 17, 2010 – June 20, 2010	CSI****-W	(United States) Will Simpson on Archie Bunker
Spruce Meadows, Calgary, Alberta, Canada	June 30, 2010 – July 4, 2010	CSI****-W	(United States) Beezie Madden on Coral Reef Via Volo
Langley, British Columbia, Canada	August 25, 2010 – August 29, 2010	CSI**-W	(United States) Ashlee Bond on Cadett
Del Mar, California, United States	September 1, 2010 – September 5, 2010	CSI**-W	(Brazil) Eduardo Menezes on Percynality
Spruce Meadows, Calgary, Alberta, Canada	September 3, 2010 – September 5, 2010	CSI**-W	(United States) Beezie Madden on Mademoiselle
San Juan Capistrano, California, United States	September 15, 2010 – September 19, 2010	CSI**-W	(United States) Michelle Spadone on Melisimo
Burbank, California, United States	September 22, 2010 – September 26, 2010	CSI**-W	(United States) Rich Fellers on Flexible
Del Mar, California, United States	Oktober 20, 2010 – Oktober 24, 2010	CSI**-W	cancelled
Monterrey, Mexico	October 27, 2010 – October 31, 2010	CSI****-W	cancelled
Las Vegas, Nevada, United States	November 3, 2010 – November 7, 2010	CSI**-W	(Brazil) Eduardo Menezes on Tomba
Rancho Murieta, California, United States	November 10, 2010 – November 14, 2010	CSI***-W	(Australia) Harley Brown on Cassiato
Burbank, California, United States	November 17, 2010 – November 21, 2010	CSI**-W	(United States) Ashlee Bond on Cadett
Balvanera, Corregidora, Mexico	November 25, 2010 – November 28, 2010	CSI***-W	cancelled
Thermal, California, United States	February 1, 2011 – February 6, 2011	CSI**-W	(United States) Rich Fellers on Flexible
Thermal, California, United States	February 8, 2011 – February 13, 2011	CSI**-W	(Brazil) Eduardo Menezes on Tomba
Thermal, California, United States	February 22, 2011 – February 27, 2011	CSI**-W	(Puerto Rico) Mark Watring on Vioco
Thermal, California, United States	March 1, 2011 – March 6, 2011	CSI**-W	(United States) Lucy Davis on Nemo

== Pacific League ==
=== Australia ===
Location	Dates	Event	Winner
Sydney, Australia	April 7, 2010	CSI*-W	(Australia) Clem Smith on Dark Ages
Sydney, Australia	May 9, 2010	CSI*-W	(Australia) Jamie Kermond on Colthaga
Toowoomba, Australia	August 1, 2010	CSI*-W	(Australia) Jamie Kermond on Colthaga
Brisbane, Australia	August 11, 2010	CSI*-W	(Australia) Rebecca Allen on Jacana
Caboolture, Australia	August 15, 2010	CSI*-W	(Australia) Tim Amitrano on Mr Innocent
Gawler, Australia	August 29, 2010	CSI*-W	(Australia) David Robertson on Sharpe Seal
Adelaide, Australia	September 9, 2010	CSI*-W	(Australia) Catherine Green on Da Vinci's Pride
Melbourne, Australia	September 26, 2010	CSI*-W	(Australia) Brook Dobbin on Advisor
Shepparton, Australia	November 18, 2010	CSI*-W	(Australia) Kristy Bruhn on Harbarty
Melbourne, Australia	November 18, 2010	CSI*-W	cancelled
Wodonga, Australia	November 20, 2010	CSI*-W	(Australia) Rebecca Allen on Jacana
Sale, Australia	November 27, 2010	CSI*-W	(Australia) Billy Raymont on Stardom
Tonimbuk, Australia	December 4, 2010	CSI*-W	(Australia) Anna McGregor on Fuerstin Faberge
Sydney, Australia (League Final)	December 12, 2010	CSI*-W	(Australia) Brook Dobbin on Advisor

=== New Zealand ===
Location	Dates	Event	Winner
Hastings, New Zealand	October 20, 2010 – October 22, 2010	CSI*-W	(New Zealand) Katie McVean on Daffodil
Kihikihi, New Zealand	November 5, 2010 – November 7, 2010	CSI*-W	(New Zealand) Philip Steiner on Online NZPH
Feilding, New Zealand	December 3, 2010 – December 4, 2010	CSI*-W	(New Zealand) Ike Unsworth on Seremonie
Taupō, New Zealand	December 14, 2010 – December 17, 2010	CSI*-W	(New Zealand) Katie McVean on Daffodil
Dannevirke, New Zealand	January 8, 2011 – January 9, 2011	CSI*-W	(New Zealand) Katie McVean on Delphi
Waitemata City, New Zealand	January 15, 2011 – January 16, 2011	CSI*-W	(New Zealand) Philip Steiner on Online NZPH
Gisborne, New Zealand	January 22, 2011 – January 23, 2011	CSI*-W	cancelled (bad weather)
Tauranga, New Zealand (League Final)	February 4, 2011 – February 6, 2011	CSI*-W	(New Zealand) Katie McVean on Delphi

== South African League ==
Location	Dates	Event	Winner
Midrand, South Africa	May 7, 2010 – May 9, 2010	CSI*-W	(South Africa) Dominey Alexander on Alzu Barracuda
Pietermaritzburg, South Africa	May 28, 2010 – June 6, 2010	CSI*-W	(South Africa) Gareth Neill on Mirage
Durban, South Africa	August 13, 2010 – August 16, 2010	CSI*-W	(South Africa) Dominey Alexander on Alzu Barracuda
Pretoria, South Africa	August 27, 2010 – August 29, 2010	CSI*-W	(South Africa) Michelle Scriven on Franlaren Lord Larymore
Polokwane, South Africa	November 5, 2010 – November 7, 2010	CSI*-W	(South Africa) Gareth Neill on Mirage
Cape Town, South Africa	November 18, 2010 – November 21, 2010	CSI*-W	(South Africa) Neriske Prinsloo on Bill Clinton

== South American League ==
Location	Dates	Event	Winner
Porto Alegre, Brazil	April 29, 2010 – May 2, 2010	CSI***-W	(Brazil) Yuri Mansur Guerios on Arlando van het Molenhof
Buenos Aires (Sol de Mayo), Argentina	May 21, 2010 – May 13, 2010	CSI*-W	cancelled
City Bell, Argentina	May 24, 2010 – May 25, 2010	CSI*-W	cancelled
São Paulo, Brazil	September 3, 2010 – September 7, 2010	CSI**-W	(Brazil) Fernando Jose de Assis Costa on Tolille Ahorn
Buenos Aires (Sol de Mayo), Argentina	September 16, 2010 – September 19, 2010	CSI*-W	(Argentina) Ricardo Dircie on Llavaneras H.J. Aries
Tortugas Country Club, Tortuguitas, Argentina	Oktober 29, 2010 – Oktober 31, 2010	CSI*-W	cancelled
Haras El Capricho, Capilla del Señor, Argentina	November 9, 2010 – November 14, 2010	CSIO****-W	(Argentina) Leandro Moschini on Gama Zarello
Rio de Janeiro, Brazil	November 18, 200 – November 21, 2010	CSI**-W	(Brazil) Vitor Alves Teixeira on Alcazar Jeff Guet
São Paulo, Brazil	December 9, 2010 – December 12, 2010	CSI**-W	(Brazil) Leandro Serrano Giunchetti on Palmar

== South East Asia League ==
Location	Dates	Event	Winner
Putrajaya, Malaysia	May 13, 2010 – May 16, 2010	CSI*-W	cancelled
Putrajaya, Malaysia	July 1, 2010 – July 4, 2010	CSI*-W	cancelled
Kuang, Malaysia	July 15, 2010 – July 18, 2010	CSI*-W	(Sweden) Helena Gabrielsson on Nausicaa du Saulcy
Kuang, Malaysia	July 30, 2010 – August 1, 2010	CSI*-W	(Thailand) Akkara Konglapamnuay on Celine
Kuang, Malaysia	August 5, 2010 – August 8, 2010	CSI*-W	(Sweden) Helena Gabrielsson on Nausicaa du Saulcy
Nakorn Nayok, Thailand	January 14, 2011 – January 16, 2011	CSI*-W	(Sweden) Helena Gabrielsson on Nausicaa du Saulcy
Nakorn Nayok, Thailand	January 28, 2011 – January 30, 2011	CSI*-W	(United States) Mary Kate Hassett on Ojasper
Nakorn Nayok, Thailand	February 10, 2011 – February 13, 2011	CSI*-W	(Sweden) Helena Gabrielsson on Nausicaa du Saulcy

== Western European League ==
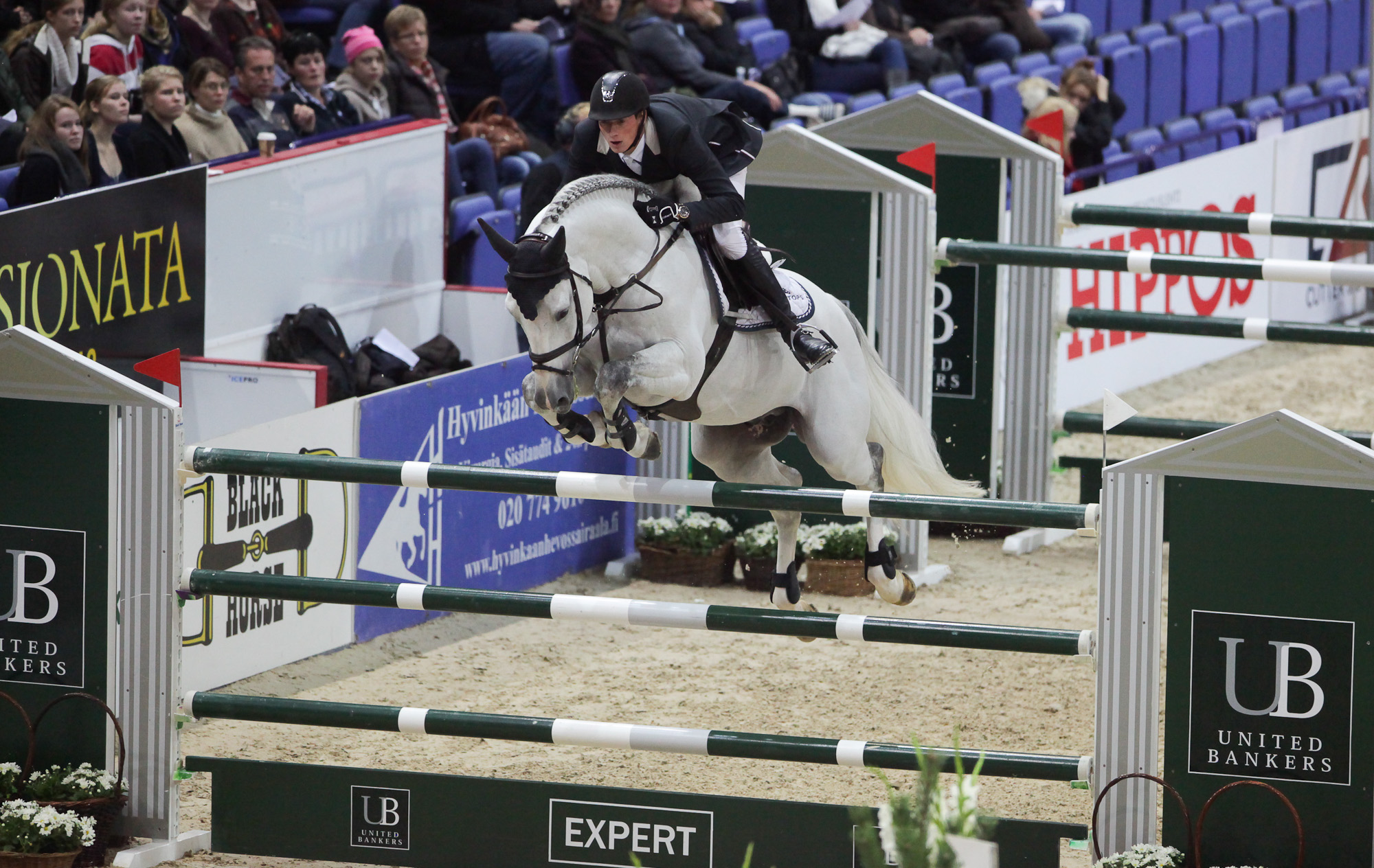
German rider Daniel Deußer with Untouchable, World cup competition at the 2011 Helsinki Horse Show

Location	Dates	Event	Winner
Oslo, Norway Video	October 14, 2010 – October 17, 2010	CSI*****-W	(Germany) Christian Ahlmann on Taloubet Z
Helsinki, Finland Video	October 21, 2010 – October 24, 2010	CSI*****-W	(Germany) Christian Ahlmann on Taloubet Z
Lyon, France Video	October 27, 2010 – November 1, 2010	CSI*****-W	(Germany) Meredith Michaels-Beerbaum on Checkmate
Verona, Italy Video	November 4, 2010 – November 7, 2010	CSI*****-W	(Netherlands) Jeroen Dubbeldam on Simon
Stuttgart, Germany Video	November 17, 2010 – November 21, 2010	CSI*****-W	(Germany) Carsten-Otto Nagel on Corradina
Le Grand-Saconnex near Geneva, Switzerland Video	December 9, 2010 – December 12, 2010	CSI*****-W	(France) Kevin Staut on Silvana de Hus
London, United Kingdom Video (Olympia International Horse Show)	December 14, 2010 – December 20, 2010	CSI*****-W	(United Kingdom) Michael Whitaker on Amai
Mechelen, Belgium Video	December 26, 2010 – December 30, 2010	CSI*****-W	(Republic of Ireland) Jessica Kürten on Myrtille Paulois
Zürich, Switzerland Video	January 28, 2011 – January 30, 2011	CSI*****-W	(Germany) Marcus Ehning on Küchengirl
Bordeaux, France Video	February 4, 2011 – February 6, 2011	CSI*****-W	(Germany) Philipp Weishaupt on Catoki
Vigo, Spain Video	February 10, 2011 – February 13, 2011	CSI*****-W	(France) Michel Robert on Kellemoi de Pepita
Gothenburg, Sweden	February 24, 2011 – February 27, 2011	CSI*****-W	(Sweden) Angelica Augustsson on Midtown du Tillard
's-Hertogenbosch, Netherlands Video	March 24, 2011 – March 27, 2011	CSI*****-W	(Republic of Ireland) Denis Lynch on Abbervail van het Dingeshof

== World Cup Final ==
Location	Dates	Event	Winner
Leipzig Trade Fair, Leipzig, Germany	April 27, 2011 – May 1, 2011	CSI-W Final	(Germany) Christian Ahlmann on Taloubet Z

== Incidents ==
- Oslo: Calvados Z, ridden by Christian Ahlmann (GER) died suddenly in his stable after jumping a clear round earlier in the day.
- Oslo: Emanuele Guadiano (ITA) riding Chicago was disqualified after blood became visible on the horse's flanks in the jump off.
- Verona: Eric Lamaze's (CAN) Hickstead collapsed and died after suffering an aortic rupture after their round.
