= Robinson (horse) =

Jumping horse

- Breed: Hanoverian
- Sire: Raphael (Westphalian)
- Grandsire: Ramiro Z (Holsteiner)
- Dam: Garina (Hanoverian)
- Maternal grandsire: Grande (Hanoverian)
- Sex: Gelding
- Foaled: 1988
- Country: Germany
- Colour: Fleabitten Gray
- Owner: HMB Enterprises

Robinson is a horse ridden by the American show jumper Richard Spooner.

Robinson was bought as an 8-year-old from Ludger and Marcus Beerbaum in 1996. Since then, he has won over $1 million in prize money and over 40 Grands Prix, including the Queen's Cup, the Chrysler Classic Derby, and the Las Vegas Grand Prix at the 2003 World Cup Finals. Robinson kept competing until 19 years old.

In addition, Robinson has been made PCHA horse of the year three times, the United States Grand Prix League horse of the year, and earned a fourth-place finish in the strenuous Riders Tour in Europe.

Robinson is known for hanging his tongue out of his mouth during competitions, usually to the right, a quirk which many find endearing.
