= Hilton Flight =

Show jumping horse

- Breed: Irish Sport Horse
- Sire: Errigal Flight (ISH)
- Dam: Occasion VII (Thoroughbred)
- Sex: Gelding
- Foaled: 1993
- Died: 2009 (aged 15–16)
- Country: Ireland
- Colour: Bay, star, near fore sock
- Breeder: Jennifer Giles
- Owner: Emily McDaniel

Hilton Flight (1993–2009) was a horse ridden in international show jumping by Richard Spooner. He stood 17.0 hh (173 cm). He was bred by Jennifer Giles, in Kilmurray, Kilmacanogue, Bray, County Wicklow.

Hilton Flight is by the Irish Sport Horse stallion Errigal Flight, who is a son of the great Irish Draught producer of show jumpers, King of Diamonds. Errigal Flight also sired Ado Annie, ridden by Will Simpson. He was ridden successfully as a young horse in Ireland by Clement McMahon before being sold into the U.S., where he won multiple Grands Prix with Richard Spooner.

Hilton Flight died in 2009.

== Major achievements ==
- 2003 Won $40,000 Esso Imperial oil Grand Prix at Spruce Meadows, Calgary, Canada
- 2003 Won $75,000 BP Cup at Spruce Meadows
- 2004 World Cup Final, Milan, Italy highest American 12th place
- 2004 Won $150,000 Ford Grand Prix Of The Desert at Indio, CA
- 2004 PCHA Horse of The Year
- 2004 $40,000 Los Angeles International Grand Prix 2004
- 2004 $40,000 Showpark Grand Prix
- 2004 Won Round 1 OLYMPIC TRIALS
- 2004 2nd $50,000 EMO Grand Prix
- 2005 Won $75,000 HITS Grand Prix at Indio, CA
- 2006 2nd Luscar Cup 1m50 at Spruce Meadows
- 2006 5th CN Reliability Spruce Meadows Grand Prix 1m60
- 2006 2nd $175,000 Shell Cup derby (time fault) winnings Ca $35,000 at Spruce Meadows
