= Rich Fellers =

American equestrian (born 1959)

Personal information
- Full name: Richard Rankin Fellers
- Nationality: American
- Born: October 3, 1959 (age 66); Coos Bay, Oregon, United States

Richard Rankin Fellers (born October 3, 1959) is an American former Olympic equestrian and horse trainer. In 2023 he pled guilty to sexually abusing one of his students when she was 17. According to the Washington County, Oregon district attorney, he will serve 30 months in state prison concurrently with a four-year federal sentence.

== Early life and education ==
Fellers, the son of Richard D. and Colleen M. (Smith) Fellers, was born in Coos Bay, Oregon. He graduated from Yamhill-Carlton High School in 1978, and attended Oregon State University as an engineering major. He left the university in his junior year to start a riding business, and moved to California, where he met Michelle "Shelley" Bramble. In 1987 they returned to Oregon, wed, and started a family. They have a son and a daughter.

== Career ==
According to the U. S. Equestrian Foundation (USEF), when Fellers was eleven years old his birthday present was a two-year-old Appaloosa: "The short, stocky horse had a talent for jumping, and the pair eventually became winners from the West Coast U. S. Grand Prix circuit to Spruce Meadows in Canada."

By 1988, Fellers had won the Arthritis Foundation Grand Prix at the Oaks in San Juan Capistrano three years in a row— twice riding the veteran mount Bailey's Irish Cream, and then on El Mirasol, his own 6-year-old chestnut thoroughbred.

In 1998, the Calgary Herald reported on his wins at the North American show jumping championships: "In the long history of Spruce Meadows, no one could quite recall a week like Fellers had. Of the nine featured classes over five days of competition, Fellers finished either first or second in every single event."

Fellers began riding Flexible, an Irish Sport Horse stallion, in 2002. According to the USEF Network,

In 2007, Fellers and Flexible won the Los Angeles National Grand Prix CSI2... In 2008, aboard Flexible, Fellers won three of the four FEI World Cup qualifiers at HITS Thermal... Flexible was one of the USEF's Horses of Honor in 2008... Their strong results in the 2010/2011 season earned them the top spot again in the North American West Coast League... Fellers and Flexible won the 2012 Rolex/FEI World Cup, the first American pair to do so in 25 years... Fellers and Flexible represented the United States at the 2012 London Olympic Games, where they finished eighth individually.

Fellers at age 52 and 16-year-old Flexible were the oldest pair in the show jumping finals at the World Cup finals in the Netherlands. Flexible was retired in 2017, and he died of natural causes in 2021.

A resident of Sherwood, Oregon, Fellers and his wife Shelley operated Rich Fellers Stables in Oregon City, Oregon starting in 2011. Fellers trained horses there, offering jumping lessons as well as purchasing and selling horses. Harry and Molly Chapman, the owners of Flexible, hired Fellers in 2012 to train their horses and ride their best in competition.

In 2021, the United States Center for SafeSport ruled Fellers ineligible to participate in the sport, in connection with a criminal indictment. Fellers initially denied allegations that he sexually abused a minor, pleading not guilty to all four criminal charges.

In March 2022 a Bloomberg News article about tensions between SafeSport and traditionalists explored the background to Feller's case. His trial on the state charges was set for fall 2022 but was ongoing as of April 2023, when Washington County deputy district attorney Rayney Meisel confirmed that he expected the case to reach a resolution and global settlement, in coordination with federal prosecutors.

Federal prosecutors brought charges in May 2023, the month after his wife Shelley filed for divorce. Fellers initially pled not guilty to those as well. He changed his plea to "guilty" in July 2023, as part of a plea deal which, per a statement from the Washington County district attorney's office, will result in a 30 month state sentence and a four year federal sentence.

== Selected competitions ==
- Equestrian at the 1991 Pan American Games
- 2008 CSIO Spruce Meadows 'Masters' Tournament
- 2008 CSIO Spruce Meadows 'Masters' Tournament – CN International
- 2008 FEI World Cup Jumping Final
- 2008, 2012 Show Jumping World Cup
- FEI World Cup Jumping 2009/2010
- 2010 Dublin Horse Show
- 2010 Falsterbo Horse Show
- FEI World Cup Jumping 2010/2011
- 2010 FEI World Cup Jumping Final
- 2010 Royal International Horse Show
- 2011 CSIO Schweiz
- 2011 FEI Nations Cup Promotional League
- 2011 FEI World Cup Finals
- 2011 Jumping International de France
- 2011 Piazza di Siena
- FEI World Cup Jumping 2011/2012
- 2012 FEI World Cup Finals (show jumping and dressage)
- Equestrian at the 2012 Summer Olympics – Individual jumping
- Equestrian at the 2012 Summer Olympics – Team jumping
- 2015 FEI World Cup Finals (show jumping and dressage)

== Awards and honors ==
- Competed in nine annual championships.
- On the Bronze winning U.S. team at the 1991 Pan American Games in Havana, Cuba.
- 2006 West Coast League winner.
- Competed in two events at the 2012 Summer Olympics.
- 2012 United States Equestrian Federation Equestrian of the Year award.
- Inducted into the Oregon Sports Hall of Fame in 2012.

== See also ==
- Show jumping
- World Show Jumping Championships
