= Valentina Truppa =

Italian equestrian

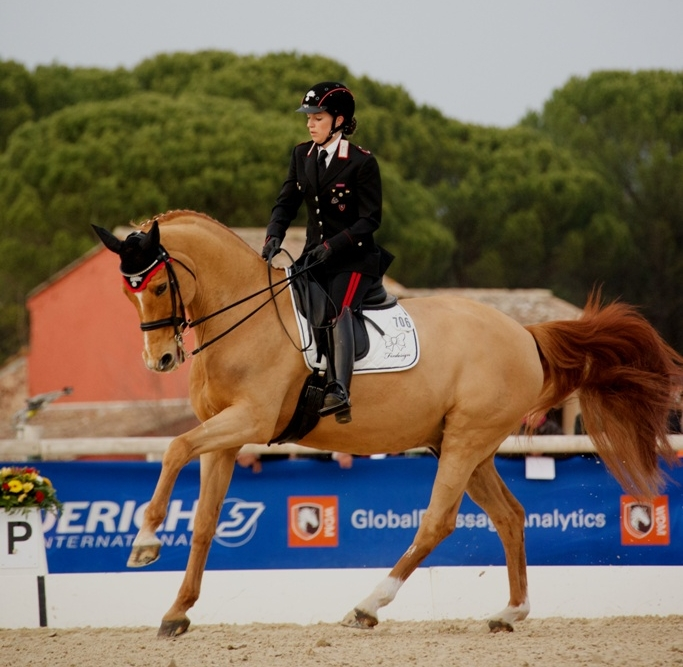
- Valentina Truppa and Chablis (2015)

Personal information
- Born: 18 March 1986 (age 40) Milan, Italy
Medal record
Equestrian
Representing Italy
World Cup
Bronze medal – third place	2012 Den Bosch	Individual dressage

Valentina Truppa (born 18 March 1986 in Milan) is an Italian Olympic dressage rider. She represented Italy in two Summer Olympics (2012 and 2016 Summer Olympics). Her best Olympic result came in 2012 when she placed 15th individually.

Truppa also competed at the 2014 World Equestrian Games and at three European Dressage Championships (in 2011, 2013 and 2021). She placed 12th in the team competition in 2013, while her current best individual placement is 16th from 2011. Truppa participated at two editions of the Dressage World Cup finals, finishing in 3rd position in 2012, and earning the first major dressage podium finish for Italy.
