= 2008 CSIO Spruce Meadows 'Masters' Tournament =

The 2008 CSIO Spruce Meadows 'Masters' Tournament was an international show jumping competition that took place from September 3 to September 7, 2008 at Spruce Meadows in Calgary, Alberta, Canada.

== Results ==
=== September 6 ===
==== BMO Nations' Cup ====
Nine teams of four riders competed in the $350,000 FEI Nations Cup event, the eighteenth event in the 2008 FEI Nations Cup series. There were two rounds to the event, with all teams placing and receiving financial prizes.

	Team	Rider	Horse	Round 1		Round 2		Total	
	Team	Rider	Horse	Penalties	Time	Penalties	Time	Penalties	Time
1	United States	Lauren Hough	Quick Study	4	82.31	8	83.70		
1	United States	Todd Minikus	Pavarotti	0	82.65	0	82.82		
1	United States	Richard Spooner	Cristallo	0	84.24	0	81.86		
1	United States	Rich Fellers	Flexible	4	81.66	0	81.29		
1	United States			4	248.55	0	245.97	4	494.52
2	Canada	Jill Henselwood	Special Ed	4	78.50	16	82.58		
2	Canada	Jonathan Asselin	Rayana Chiara	8	81.07	4	83.81		
2	Canada	Eric Lamaze	Hickstead	0	84.20	0	83.73		
2	Canada	Ian Millar	In Style	0	83.82	0	81.68		
2	Canada			4	246.52	4	249.22	8	495.74
3	Germany	Holger Wulschner	Clausen	0	81.11	4	82.20		
3	Germany	Thomas Muehlbauer	Asti Spumante 7	0	83.10	4	83.60		
3	Germany	Marcus Ehning	Plot Blue	0	82.17	0	84.89		
3	Germany	Alois Pollmann-Schweckhorst	Lord Luis	—		8	84.02		
3	Germany			0	246.38	8	250.69	8	497.07

=== September 7 ===
==== CN International ====
Thirty-nine riders competed in the $1,000,000 CN International.

	Rider	Horse	Round 1		Round 2		Total penalties
	Rider	Horse	Penalties	Time (s)	Penalties	Time (s)	Total penalties
1	(United Kingdom) Nick Skelton	Arko III	0	89.361	1	81.443	1
2	(Belgium) Jos Lansink	Cavalor Cumano	1	93.439	2	83.995	3
3	(United States) Richard Spooner	Cristallo	4	85.543	0	75.676	4
