= Ariat =

American equestrian apparel brand

Ariat International, Inc.
- Type: Private
- Industry: Sportswear
- Founded: 1993
- Founder: Beth Cross, Pam Parker
- Headquarters: San Leandro, California, United States
- Area served: Worldwide
- Products: Riding boots Cowboy boots Work boots
- Website: www.ariat.com

Ariat is an American footwear, apparel and accessories brand for equestrian sports, work industries and other outdoor activities, located in San Leandro, California. Ariat was launched by Beth Cross and Pam Parker in 1993.

== History ==
Ariat was founded in 1993 by Stanford Business School classmates Beth Cross and Pam Parker, who, while working for Bain & Company and Reebok, saw they could apply athletic shoe technology to English and Western riding boots. The company is named for Secretariat, the champion racehorse. The same year it was founded, Ariat released its first two boot styles, then went on to hire a number of equestrians and horse enthusiasts. In the years following the company's launch, it expanded into new performance western and English apparel, as well as workwear. The company also expanded its distribution in the U.S., Europe, Australia, Mexico, and Japan.

In 2009, Ariat became the official boot sponsor of the Professional Bull Riders (PBR). In 2015, Ariat signed a sponsorship deal with the International Federation for Equestrian Sports (FEI).

In 2018, Ariat announced that they were continuing their partnership with the US Equestrian Federation (USEF), and Cross was awarded "Entrepreneur of the Year" in the Consumer Driven category by Ernst & Young.

== Product design ==
Ariat manufactures boots in the United States, Mexico, Asia and Europe.

Most of Ariat manufacturing is outsourced to Mexico, Vietnam, and China. Their Two24 line of Men's boots are made in the United States. All of their boots are designed at their headquarters in Union City, California.

In 2006, the firm ventured into making western apparel, including woven shirts, tops and outdoor clothing for men and women. The clothing incorporates flame-resistant technology, which came into demand from the oil workers of Colorado.
