= Steve Guerdat =

Swiss equestrian (born 1982)

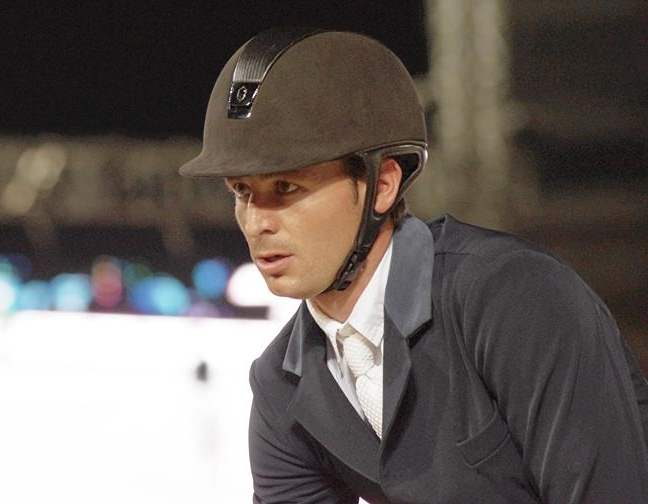
- Guerdat in 2012

Personal information
- Full name: Steve Guerdat
- Nationality: Switzerland
- Discipline: Show jumping
- Born: 10 June 1982 (age 44); Bassecourt, Switzerland
- Height: 6 ft 0 in (1.83 m)
- Weight: 143 lb (65 kg; 10 st 3 lb)
Medal record
Equestrian
Representing Switzerland
Olympic Games
Gold medal – first place	2012 London	Individual jumping
Silver medal – second place	2024 Paris	Individual Jumping
Bronze medal – third place	2008 Beijing	Team jumping
World Championships
Gold medal – first place	2026 Aachen	Individual jumping
Bronze medal – third place	2018 Tryon	Individual jumping
European Championships
Gold medal – first place	2023 Milan	Individual jumping
Gold medal – first place	2009 Windsor	Team jumping
Gold medal – first place	2021 Riesenbeck	Team jumping
Silver medal – second place	2005 San Patrignano	Team jumping
Bronze medal – third place	2003 Donaueschingen	Team jumping
Bronze medal – third place	2017 Gothenburg	Team jumping
World Cup
Gold medal – first place	2015 Las Vegas	Individual jumping
Gold medal – first place	2016 Gothenburg	Individual jumping
Gold medal – first place	2019 Gothenburg	Individual jumping
Silver medal – second place	2012 Den Bosch	Individual jumping
Silver medal – second place	2013 Gothenburg	Individual jumping
Bronze medal – third place	2007 Las Vegas	Individual jumping

Steve Guerdat (born 10 June 1982) is a Swiss equestrian who competes in the sport of show jumping.

He is the 2012 Olympic Champion, and the 2024 vice Olympic Champion in individual jumping. He also won the bronze medal at the 2008 Summer Olympics in team jumping.

He has also won the 2026 World Equestrian Games, the 2023 European Championships, and the 2015, 2016, and 2019 World Cup in individual jumping.

He is the only show jumping athlete to have ever won individual gold at the Olympic Games, the World Equestrian Games, the European Championships, and the World Cup.

== Career ==
Guerdat began riding at the age of seven. He was trained by his father, Philippe Guerdat, and by Beat Mändli. Between 1997 and 2002 he was part of two junior and three young rider European championships and won two bronze medals with the team. In 2003 he switched to the Netherlands and worked there for Jan Tops. He was selected for the jumping events at the 2004 Summer Olympics where he rode "Olympic". In 2006 he moved to Belgium and worked for three months for billionaire Oleksandr Onishchenko. After that Yves Piaget bought him the mare Jalisca Solier, with which he won the World Cup in Geneva. He was selected for the 2008 Summer Olympics where he rode Jalisca Solier and won the bronze medal in team jumping following the disqualification of Norwegian rider Tony André Hansen. In 2009 and 2011 he was named "Swiss rider of the year".

In 2012, Steve reached for the first time to top place of the world rankings. That same year he competed in London with the French Selle-Francais Nino de Buissonnets at his third Olympic Games. He was the only rider who jumped cleanly in the two final rounds of the competition and won the individual jumping gold medal. He was the first Swiss rider to win a gold medal in the jumping event since 1924 where Alphonse Gemuseus won in individual jumping.

== Personal life ==
Guerdat is the youngest son of Olympic show jumper Philippe Guerdat.

From April 2007 till 2017 Guerdat has lived in Herrliberg in the stables of Urs Schwarzenbach. Since 2017 he lives in his owns stables near Zürich in Elgg. The stables were in the past propriety of the Swiss rider Paul Weier.

In the summer 2019, French equestrian Fanny Skalli announced on her Instagram account that she was engaged with Steve Guerdat. The couple married in the early of 2021 and on 4 April 2021, their daughter Ella was born.

== Notable horses ==
=== Current ===
- Venard de Cerisy: 2009 Selle Français Gelding (Open up Semilly x Rosee de Cerisy) Owner: C.H.C Horses SA
- Dynamix de Belhème: 2013 Selle Français Mare
- Albfuehren's Iashin Sitte: 2014 Belgian Sporthorse Gelding
- Is-Minka: 2013 Dutch Warmblood Mare
- Lancelotta: 2013 Westfalian Mare
- Looping Luna: 2014 Hanoverian Mare
- Easy Star de Talma: 2014 Selle Français Stallion

=== Former ===
- Olympic Z: 1996 Dutch Warmblood Gelding (Concorde x Ridder)
- Pialotta: 1991 Mare (Pilot x Akitos xx)
- Tiyl: 1996 Belgian Warmblood Gelding (Fantastique x Codex)
- Urgent III: 2001 Dutch Warmblood Gelding (Numero Uno x Julio Mariner)
- Jalisca Solier: 1997-2014 Selle Français Mare (Aligator Fontaine x Dune Solier) Owner: Yves G. Piaget
- Nino des Buissonnets: 2001 Selle Français Gelding (Kannan x Hermine du Prelet (NarcosII)) Owner: Urs Schwarzenbach
- Alamo: 2008 KWPN Gelding (Ukato x Mariona) Owner: Pasquel Mendez Gerardo
- PB Maserati: 2012 Belgian Gelding (Emerald Van't Ruytershof x Cum Laude Z)
- Dom Perignon: 2013 Selle Français Gelding (Quintus D'09 x Coca Z)
- Victorio des Frotards: 2009 Selle Français Gelding (Barbarian x Fennecy Chetardie)
- Tum Play du Jouas: 2007 Selle Français Gelding (Querlybet Hero x Fée du Jouas)
- Albfuehren's Maddox: 2011 Swedish Warmblood Stalion (Cohiba 1198 x Miami) Owner: Hofgut Albführen GmbH
- Ulysse des Forets: 2008 Selle Français Mare (Col Canto x Lavende des Forets) Owner: Steve Guerdat and La Giraffa SA
- Flair: 2010 KWPN Mare (Zirocco Blue Vdl x Brandy) Owner: Mendez Gerardo-Pasquel
- Mighty Mouse: 2006 Zangersheide Gelding
- Albfuehren's Maddox: 2011 Sweden Stallion (Miami x Cohiba 1998)
- Albfuehren's Bianca XXXIV: 2006 Swedish Warmblood Mare (Balou du Rouet x Cardento) Owner: Steve Guerdat and Hofgut Albführen GmbH

== Sponsors ==
- Rolex
- Hermès
- Toyota
- Horseware Ireland

== International championship results ==
Results
Year	Event	Horse	Placing	Notes
1997	European Junior Championships	Cayetano	3rd place, bronze medalist(s)	Team
1997	European Junior Championships	Cayetano	12th	Individual
1999	European Junior Championships	Mecano	6th	Team
1999	European Junior Championships	Mecano	4th	Individual
2000	European Young Rider Championships	Mecano	4th	Team
2000	European Young Rider Championships	Mecano	13th	Individual
2001	European Young Rider Championships	Enzzo	7th	Team
2001	European Young Rider Championships	Enzzo	5th	Individual
2002	European Young Rider Championships	Lord Farei	3rd place, bronze medalist(s)	Team
2002	European Young Rider Championships	Lord Farei	34th	Individual
2003	European Championships	Tepic La Silla	3rd place, bronze medalist(s)	Team
2003	European Championships	Tepic La Silla	6th	Individual
2004	Olympic Games	Olympic	5th	Team
2004	Olympic Games	Olympic	50th	Individual
2005	World Cup Final	Pialotta	6th	
2005	European Championships	Pialotta	2nd place, silver medalist(s)	Team
2005	European Championships	Pialotta	7th	Individual
2007	World Cup Final	Tresor	3rd place, bronze medalist(s)	
2008	World Cup Final	Tresor	7th	
2008	Olympic Games	Jalisca Solier	3rd place, bronze medalist(s)	Team
2008	Olympic Games	Jalisca Solier	9th	Individual
2009	World Cup Final	Tresor	8th	
2009	European Championships	Jalisca Solier	1st place, gold medalist(s)	Team
2009	European Championships	Jalisca Solier	16th	Individual
2010	World Cup Final	Tresor / Jalisca Solier	15th	
2010	World Equestrian Games	Tresor	13th	Team
2010	World Equestrian Games	Tresor	96th	Individual
2011	European Championships	Jalisca Solier	6th	Team
2011	European Championships	Jalisca Solier	29th	Individual
2012	World Cup Final	Nino des Buissonnets	2nd place, silver medalist(s)	
2012	Olympic Games	Nino des Buissonnets	4th	Team
2012	Olympic Games	Nino des Buissonnets	1st place, gold medalist(s)	Individual
2013	World Cup Final	Nino des Buissonnets	2nd place, silver medalist(s)	
2013	European Championships	Nino des Buissonnets	5th	Team
2013	European Championships	Nino des Buissonnets	8th	Individual
2014	World Cup Final	Nino des Buissonnets	5th	
2014	World Equestrian Games	Nino des Buissonnets	11th	Team
2014	World Equestrian Games	Nino des Buissonnets	11th	Individual
2015	World Cup Final	Paille	1st place, gold medalist(s)	
2016	World Cup Final	Corbinian	1st place, gold medalist(s)	
2016	Olympic Games	Nino des Buissonnets	6th	Team
2016	Olympic Games	Nino des Buissonnets	4th	Individual
2017	World Cup Final	Bianca	8th	
2017	European Championships	Bianca	3rd place, bronze medalist(s)	Team
2017	European Championships	Bianca	15th	Individual
2018	World Cup Final	Bianca	10th	
2018	World Equestrian Games	Bianca	4th	Team
2018	World Equestrian Games	Bianca	3rd place, bronze medalist(s)	Individual
2019	World Cup Final	Alamo	1st place, gold medalist(s)	
2019	European Championships	Bianca	6th	Team
2019	European Championships	Bianca	12th	Individual
2021	Olympic Games	Venard de Cerisy	5th	Team
2021	Olympic Games	Venard de Cerisy	31st	Individual
2021	European Championships	Albfuehren's Maddox	1st place, gold medalist(s)	Team
2021	European Championships	Albfuehren's Maddox	11th	Individual
2022	World Cup Final	Victorio Des Frotards	11th	
2022	World Equestrian Games	Venard de Cerisy	8th	Team
2022	World Equestrian Games	Venard de Cerisy	40th	Individual
2023	European Championships	Dynamix de Belhème	6th	Team
2023	European Championships	Dynamix de Belhème	1st place, gold medalist(s)	Individual
2024	World Cup Final	Is-Minka	9th	
2024	Olympic Games	Dynamix de Belhème	12th	Team
2024	Olympic Games	Dynamix de Belhème	2nd place, silver medalist(s)	Individual
2025	European Championships	Albfuehren's Iashin Sitte	5th	Team
2025	European Championships	Albfuehren's Iashin Sitte	12th	Individual
2026	World Cup Final	Albfuehren's Iashin Sitte	5th	
2026	World Equestrian Games	Dynamix de Belhème	6th	Team
2026	World Equestrian Games	Dynamix de Belhème	1st place, gold medalist(s)	Individual
EL = Eliminated; RET = Retired; WD = Withdrew
