= Richard Spooner (equestrian) =

American equestrian

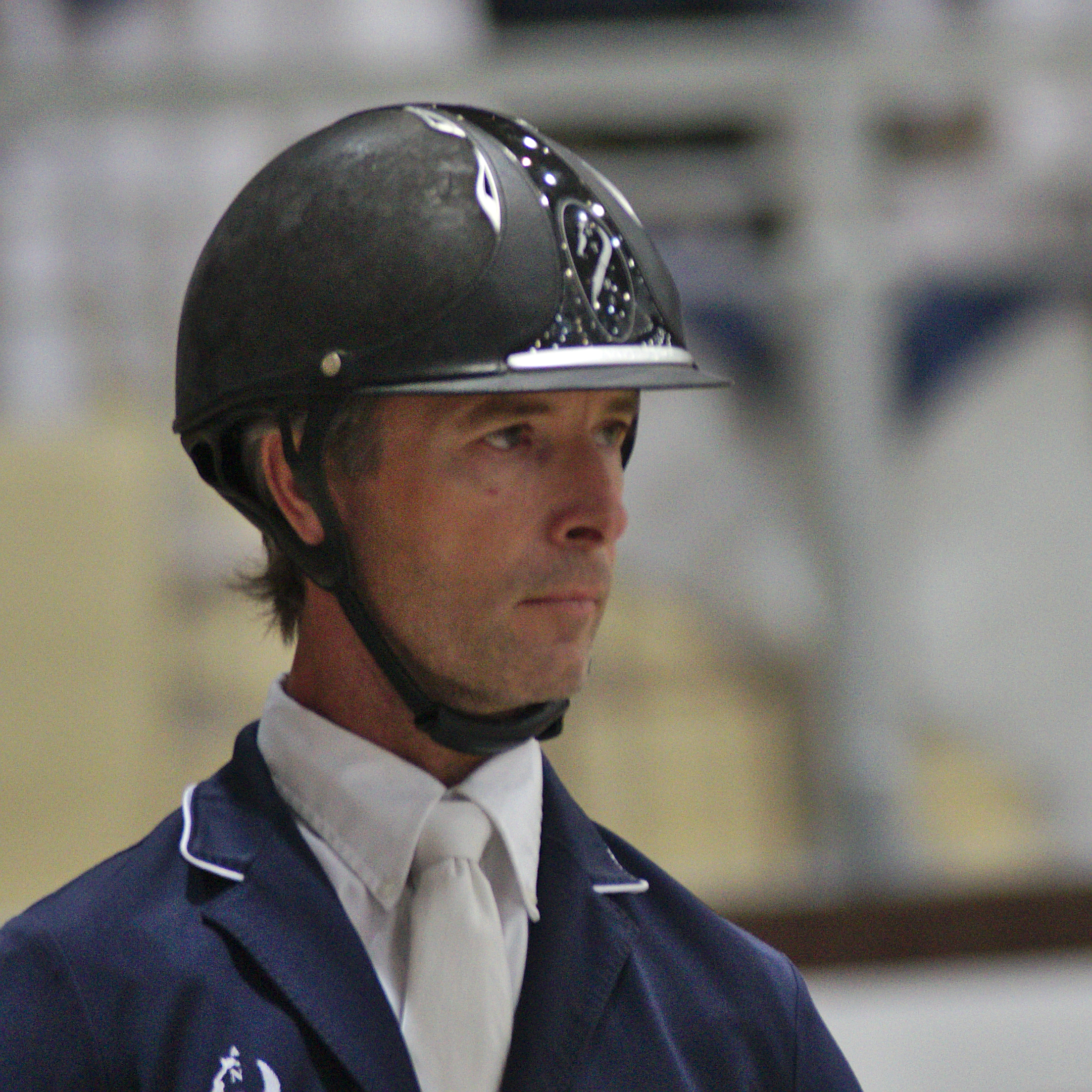
Spooner in 2013

Richard Spooner is an American equestrian. He competes in the sport of show jumping on the West Coast of the United States and in Europe. In June 2006 at Spruce Meadows, he cleared the $1-million mark, the 10th rider to reach that milestone in the show's history.

In 2010 Spooner was featured in the television series A Rider's Story along with fellow Grand Prix show jumper Ashlee Bond.

== Winning Grand Prix Horses ==
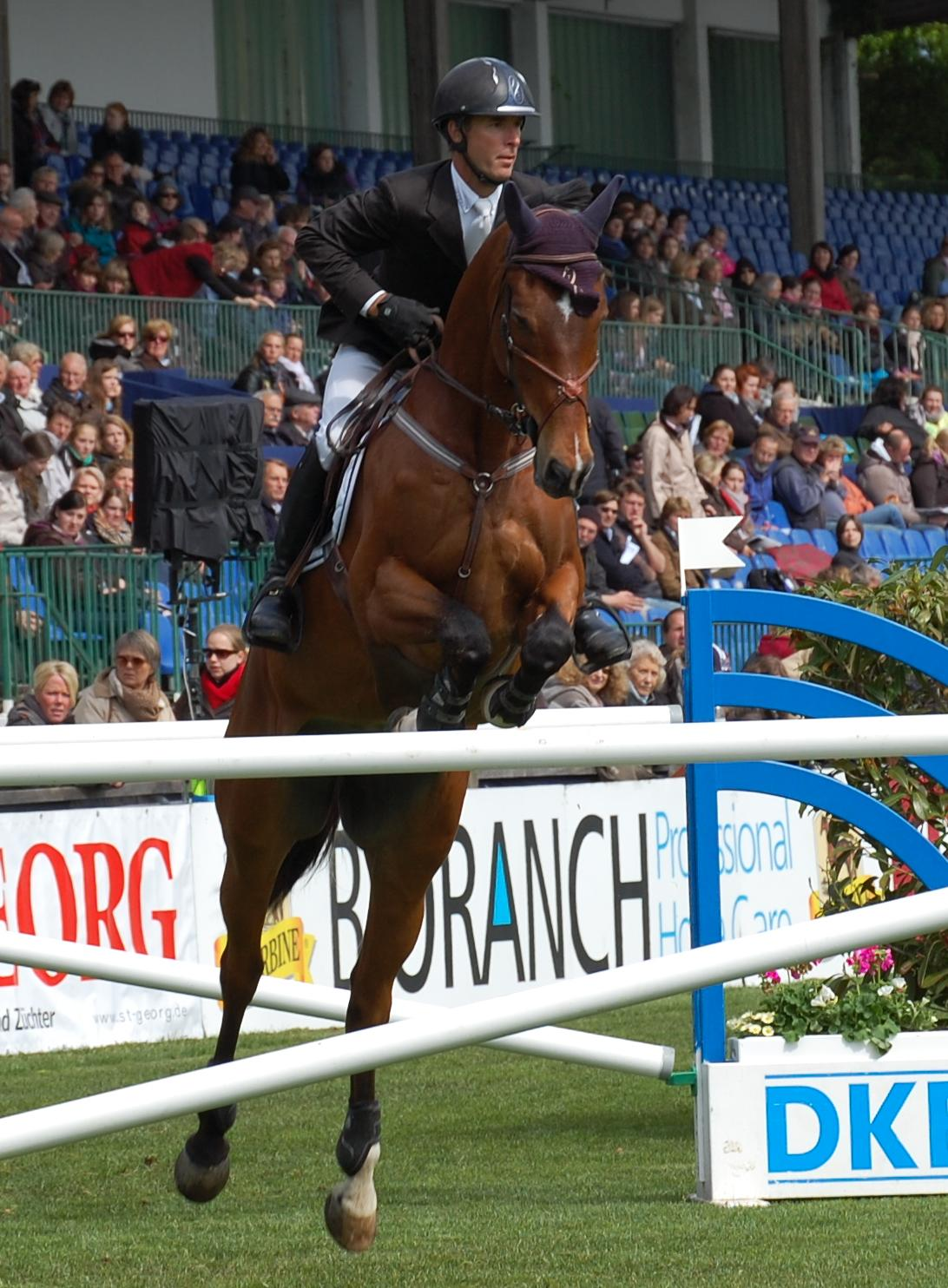
Richard Spooner with Apache, first qualifier to the German show jumping derby 2012

- Robinson
- Kirk
- Cosino
- Incento
- Bradford
- Roxy Z
- Hilton Flight
- Southshore
- Quirino 3
- Millennium
- Ace
- Ezrah
- Pako
- Cristallo
- Apache
- Airtime
- Gerry the Grey
- Cordoba
- Live Fire
- Conquest de Paradiso

== Major career wins and achievements ==
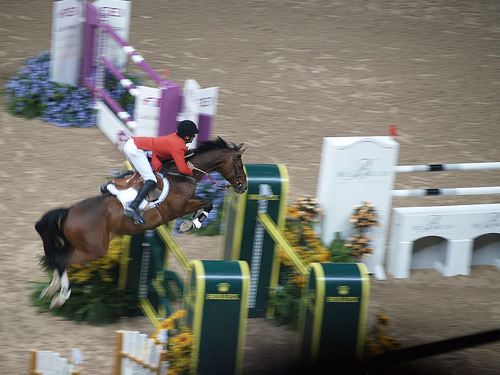
Richard Spooner riding Cristallo, 2007 World Cup Final

2005

Winner – (Quirino 3) $50,000 HBO World Cup Grand Prix of Del Mar 1 October

Winner – (Ezrah) $30,000 AriatGrand Prix 4 February

Winner – (Hilton Flight) $75,000 WCQ Grand Prix 6 February

Winner – (Quirino 3 and Millennium Tied) $30,000 AriatGrand Prix 13 February

Winner – (Ezrah) $30,000 Ariat Grand Prix March 11

Winner - (Ezrah) $150,000 Ford World Cup Grand Prix March 13

Winner – (Robinson) $25,000 Spring Classic I San Juan Capistrano, California April 3

Winner – (Millennium) $35,000 Spring Classic III San Juan Capistrano, California April 16

Winner – (Richard Spooner) Pacific Coast Rider of the Year

2004

Winner - (Bradford, 2nd on Hilton Flight, and 3rd on Robinson) $50,000 EMO Grand Prix 1 February

Winner – (Robinson) $25,000 AriatGrand Prix 13 February

Winner – (Robinson) $25,000 AriatGrand Prix March 5

Winner - (Hilton Flight) $150,000 Ford World Cup Grand Prix March 14

Winner - (Robinson) Round 1 OLYMPIC TRIALS May 14

Winner - (Hilton Flight) Round 1 OLYMPIC TRIALS May 14

Winner - (Robinson) Round 6 OLYMPIC TRIALS May 23

Winner – (Bradford and 2nd on Sunrise) $30,000 Ford Motor Company U.S Jumping Derby August 24

Winner – (Hilton Flight) $40,000 Showpark Grand Prix 3 September

Winner – (Hilton Flight) $40,000 Los Angeles International Grand Prix 25 September

Silver Medal Winner - (Robinson) Nations Cup, Spruce Meadows Masters

Winner – (Richard Spooner) Pacific Coast Rider of the Year

Winner - (Hilton Flight) PCHA Horse of the Year

2003

Winner – (Robinson) $25,000 Ariat Grand Prix 7 February

Winner – (Robinson) $75,000 Bayer/USET WCQ Grand Prix 9 February

Winner – (Robinson) $25,000 Ariat Grand Prix, Indio, California

Winner – (Robinson) $50,000 Kings Shavings Grand Prix, Indio, California

Winner – (Robinson) $35,000 San Juan Capistrano Grand Prix, California

Winner – (Bradford) $30,000 Oaks Grand Prix, San Juan Capistrano, California

Winner – (Robinson) $50,000 Grand Prix of Las Vegas, Las Vegas, Nevada

Winner – (Robinson) $25,000 Grand Prix of Del Mar, California

Winner – (Hilton Flight) $40,000 Esso Imperial Oil Grand Prix, Spruce Meadows, Canada

Winner – (Bradford) $40,000 Ford Motor Company U.S. Jumping Derby

Winner – (Bradford) $40,000 Grand Prix of Showpark

Winner – (Hilton Flight) $75,000 BP Cup, Spruce Meadows, Canada

Winner – (Quirino 3) $25,000 Oaks Blenheim Grand Prix

Winner – (Robinson) $35,000 Grand Prix of Los Angeles

Winner – (Richard Spooner) Pacific Coast Rider of the Year

Winner - (Robinson) PCHA Horse of the Year

2002

Winner - (Incento) $50,000 EMO Grand Prix January 30

Winner – (Robinson) $50,000 Commonwealth Grand Prix Lexington, Kentucky]

Winner – (Robinson) $35,000 Oaks Classic Grand Prix

Winner - (Incento) $30,000 Oaks Summer Classic Grand Prix

Winner - (Incento) $30,000 La Farge Cup Spruce Meadows, Canada

Winner – (Robinson) $200,000 Queen Elizabeth II Cup Spruce Meadows, Canada

Winner – (Robinson) $175,000 Chrysler Classic Spruce Meadows, Canada

Winner – (Hilton Flight) $40,000 U.S. Jumping Derby

Winner – (Roxy Z) $25,000 World Cup Grand Prix of San Juan Capistrano

Winner – (Richard Spooner) North American Champion (2002)

Winner – (Richard Spooner) Pacific Coast Rider of the Year

2001

Winner - (Robinson) $25,000 Ariat Grand Prix January 28

Winner - (Southshore) $50,000 EMO Grand Prix January 30

Winner - (Bradford) $25,000 Ariat Grand Prix February 4

Winner - (Robinson) $25,000 Ariat Grand Prix March 2

Winner - (Robinson) $25,000 Ariat Grand Prix March 9

Winner - (Southshore) $150,000 Ford World Cup Grand Prix March 11

Winner - (Robinson) $35,000 Lexus of Glendale Grand Prix May 28

Winner - (Incento) $25,000 Oaks Blenheim Classic Grand Prix June 8

Winner - (Robinson) $100,000 Grand Prix of Tahoe July 22

Winner - (Richard Spooner) P.C.H.A Grand Prix Rider of the Year

Winner – (Richard Spooner) United States Grand Prix Rider of the Year

Winner - (Robinson) PCHA Horse of the Year

2000

Winner - (Southshore) $50,000 Rio Vista Grand Prix

Winner - (Robinson) $150,000 Ford Grand Prix

Winner - (Southshore) $50,000 Oaks Classic Grand Prix

Winner - (Southshore) $30,000 Spruce Meadows Grand Prix

Winner - (Incento) Round 3 OLYMPIC TRIALS

Winner - (Kirk) $25,000 Treatwells Summer Classic

Winner - (Robinson) $100,000 Lake Tahoe Cosequine Grand Prix

Winner - (Kirk) $25,000 Waterfront Hilton Grand Prix

Winner - (Southshore) $35,000 Oaks International Grand Prix

Winner - (Richard Spooner) P.C.H.A Grand Prix Rider of the Year

1999

Winner - (Kirk) $25,000 Cosequin Grand Prix

Winner - (Robinson) $50,000 World Cup Grand Prix Indio

Winner - (Robinson) $150,000 Finova Grand Prix Indio

Winner - (Robinson) $45,000 Grand Prix of California

Winner - (Robinson) $40,000 Pedigree Grand Prix Los Angeles

Winner - (Kirk) 450,000 SEK Grand Prix Bratislava, Slovakia

Silver Medal Winner - (Kirk) Nations Cup, Bratislava, Slovakia

Winner - (Southshore) $25,000 Hilton Waterfront Beach Resort Grand Prix

Winner - (Southshore) $45,000 Cosequin Grand Prix of Showpark

Winner - (Southshore) $50,000 Oaks International Grand Prix

Winner - (Robinson) PCHA Horse of the Year two years in a row

Winner - (Richard Spooner) PCHA Rider of the Year four years in a row

1998

Winner - (Cosino) Grand Prix of Indio

4th Place - (Cosino) Volvo World Cup Finals - Helsinki, Finland

Winner - (Robinson) Grand Prix “The Oaks”

Winner - (Robinson) $40,000 US Jumping Derby

Winner - (Robinson) Grand Prix $50,000 “The Oaks International”

Winner - (Kirk) Grand Prix $35,000 LA International

Winner - (Robinson) Grand Prix $40,000 LA National

Winner - (Richard Spooner) P.C.H.A Grand Prix Rider of the Year

Winner - (Robinson) P.C.H.A Grand Prix Horse of the Year

Winner - (Richard Spooner) AGA West Coast Rider of the Year

- Voted as one of the top 20 riders in the world by L’ANNEE HIPPIQUE

1997

Winner - (Robinson) Cosequin Grand Prix of Indio

Winner - (Kirk) $150,000.00 Grand Prix of Indio

Winner - (Kirk) Grand Prix, San Juan Capistrano

Gold Medal Winner - (Robinson) Nations Cup, - Falsterbo, Sweden

Winner - (Robinson) Grand Prix Ball of Fire, -Falsterbo, Sweden

Silver Medal Winner - (Robinson) Nations Cup, - Gijón, Spain

Winner - (Kirk) Lala Cup, - Monterrey, Mexico

Winner - (Kirk) P.C.H.S.A. Grand Prix Horse of the Year

Winner - (Richard Spooner) P.C.H.S.A. Grand Prix Rider of the Year

1996

Winner - (Kirk) Grand Prix, San Juan Capistrano

Winner - (Kirk) Grand Prix “The Oaks”

Winner - (Robinson) Grand Prix, Pebble Beach

Winner - (Robinson) Grand Prix, “The Oaks International

Winner - (Robinson) Grand Prix, Cow Palace

Winner - (Kirk) California Horse of the Year

Winner - (Richard Spooner) P.C.H.A. Grand Prix Rider of the Year

1990-1995

Winner of hundreds of national jumper classes and jumper Championships

1989

Worked for George Morris and later went on to work for Ian Millar.

1988

Winner - United States Equestrian Team Equitation Finals

Winner - Bronze and Silver Medals from the USET for winning over Twelve medal classes throughout 1998

Reserve Champion American Horse Show Association Equitation Finals

Reserve Champion ASPCA National Equitation Championships

Voted Best Junior Rider in the Nation (Horses Magazine)

1987

Qualified for all major Equitation Finals

Ninth Place American Horse Show Association Equitation Finals

1986

Winner - (Reserve Bid) Los Angeles Horse Show Association Equitation Finals
