= Marco Kutscher =

German equestrian

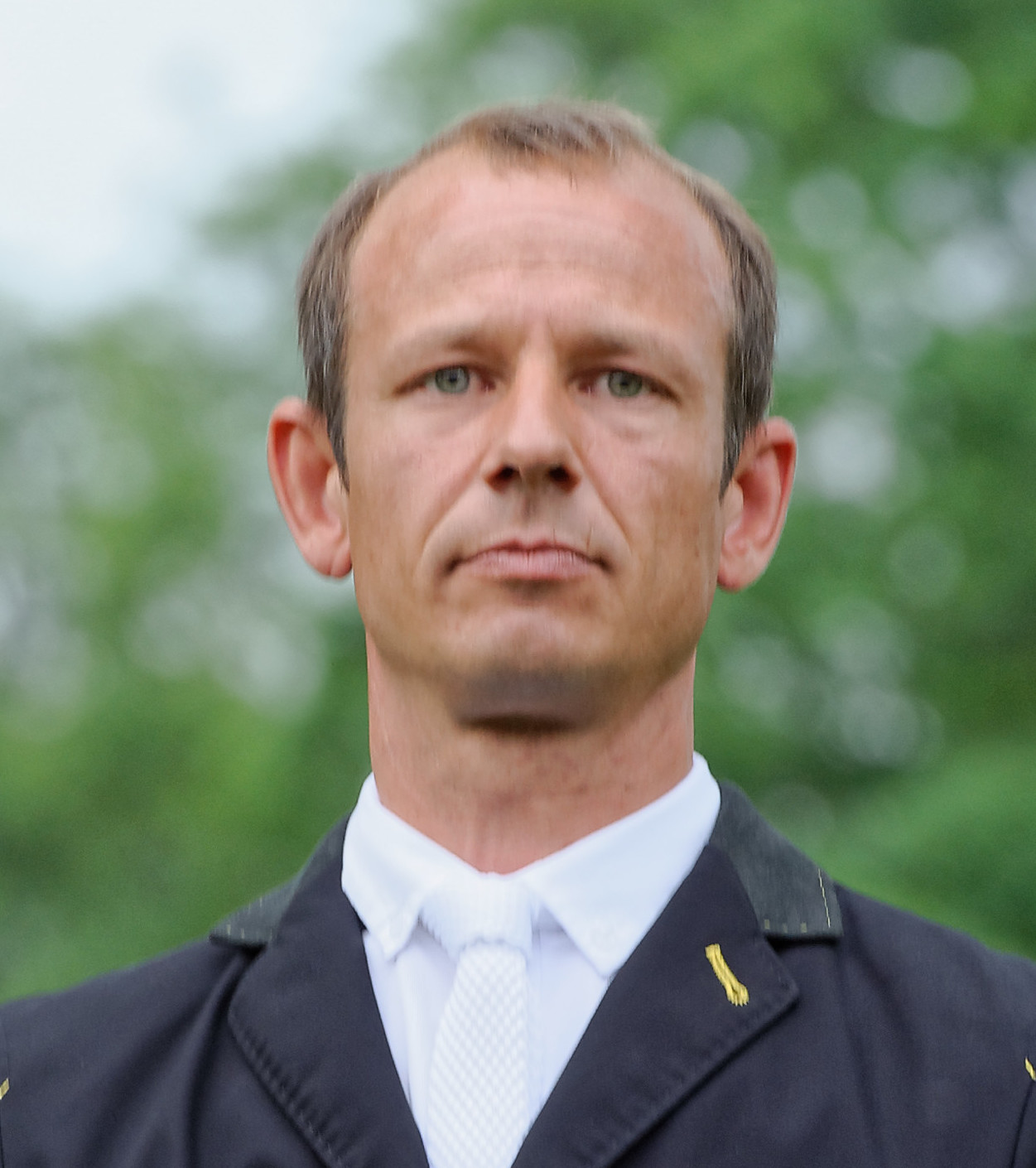

Personal information
- Full name: Marco Kutscher
- Nationality: Germany
- Discipline: Show jumping
- Born: 2 May 1975 (age 51); Norden, West Germany
- Height: 6 ft 2 in (1.88 m)
- Weight: 165 lb (75 kg; 11 st 11 lb)
Medal record
Representing Germany
Equestrian
European Championships
Gold medal – first place	2005 San Patrignano	Individual jumping
Gold medal – first place	2005 San Patrignano	Team jumping
Gold medal – first place	2011 Madrid	Team jumping
Olympic Games
Bronze medal – third place	2004 Athens	Individual jumping
Bronze medal – third place	2004 Athens	Team jumping

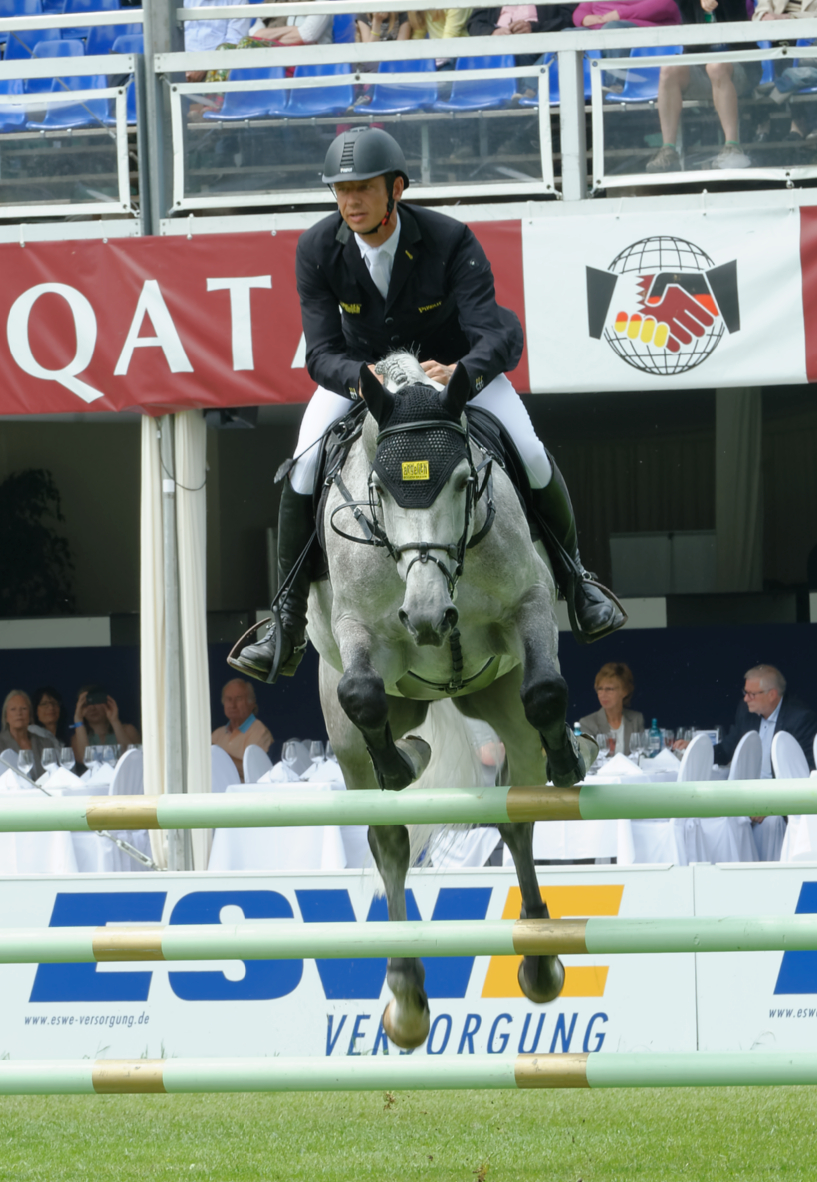
Marco Kutscher with Quadros 3 at CSIYH* in Wiesbaden 2015

Marco Kutscher (born 2 May 1975 in Norden, Lower Saxony) is a German equestrian who competes in the sport of show jumping.

== Career ==
He was selected for the 2004 Summer Olympics where he rode Montender and won the bronze medal in individual jumping following the disqualification of Irish rider Cian O'Connor.

In 2008, he competed with Cornet Obolensky at his second Olympics. In 2010, he was disqualified and fined for doping during the 2008 Olympics.

Champion of 2015 Los Angeles Longines Master with Van Gogh.

== Horses ==
=== Current ===
- Cash (born 1996), Holsteiner horse, brown, Gelding, sire: Carthago, damsire: Lavall II, Owner: Madeleine Winter-Schulze
- Cornet Obolensky (born 1999), Grey, Stallion, sire: Clinton, damsire: Heartbreaker

=== Former show horses ===
- Allerdings (born 2000), Chestnut, Gelding, sire: Arpeggio, damsire: Diamantino
- Montender (born 1994), dark brown, Stallion, sire: Contender, damsire: Burggraaf
- Controe (born 1992), Holsteiner horse, brown, Stallion, sire: Contender, damsire: Aloube Z
