= Estonian Olympic Committee =

National Olympic Committee

- Country: Estonia
- Code: EST
- Created: 8 December 1923
- Recognized: 1924 (restored: 18 September 1991)
- Continental Association: EOC
- Headquarters: Tallinn, Estonia
- President: Erich Teigamägi
- Secretary General: Kristo Tohver
- Website: www.eok.ee

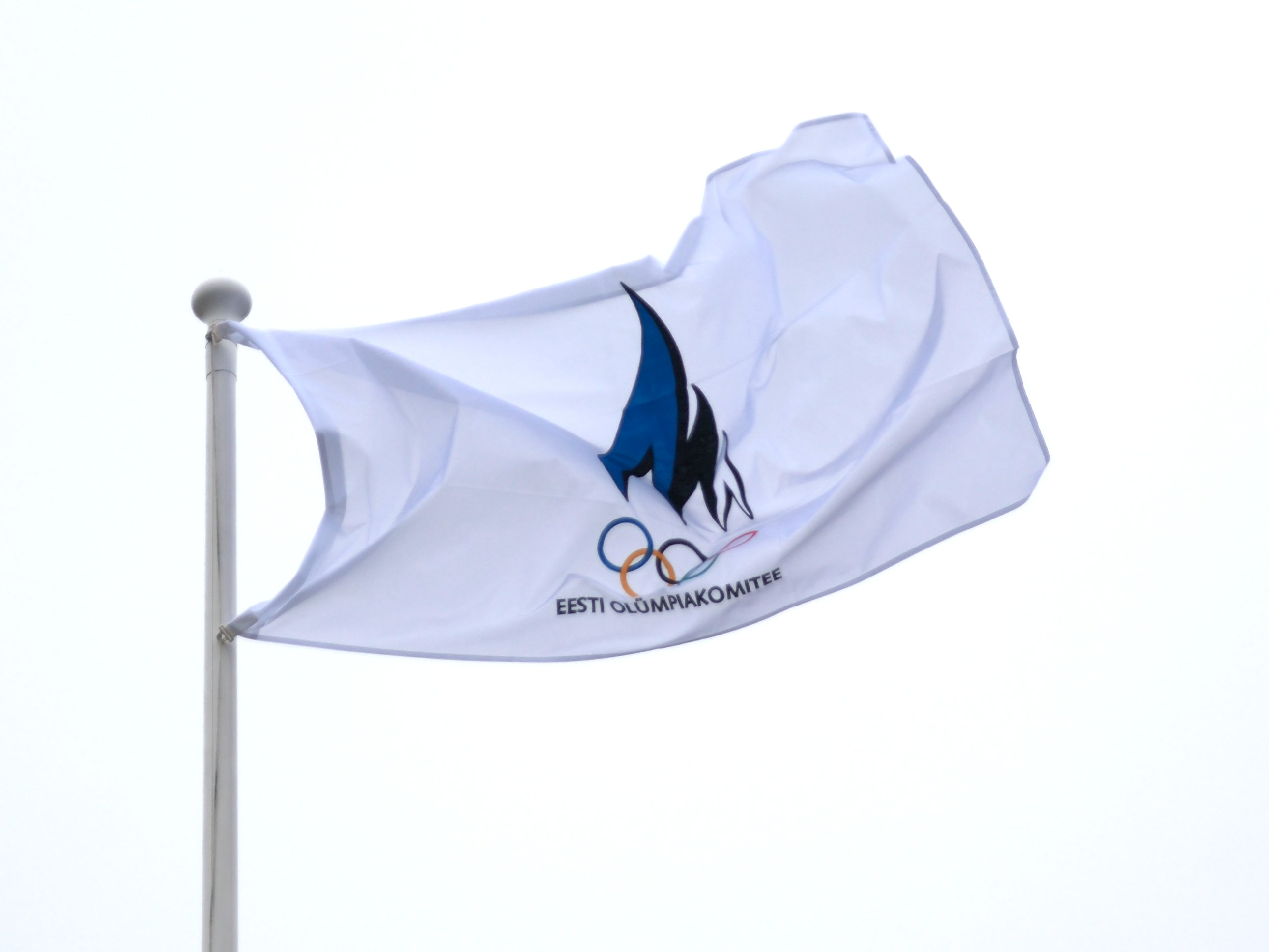
Flag of Estonian Olympic Committee

The Estonian Olympic Committee (Estonian: Eesti Olümpiakomitee, EOK; IOC Code: EST) is the National Olympic Committee responsible for Estonia's participation in the Olympic Games.

== History ==
The Estonian Sports Federation (Estonian: Eesti Spordi Liit) decided to form the Estonian Olympic Committee in the First Estonian Sport Congress (Estonian: Eesti I Spordikongress) on 30 November 1919, one and a half years after the proclamation of the independence of Estonia, but it was officially founded on 8 December 1923. The first chairman of the committee dr. Karl Friedrich Akel, was elected on 5 May 1924. An independent Estonian team took part in the Olympic Games over the period of 1920–1936. As Estonia was invaded and occupied in 1940, and reoccupied by the Soviet Union in 1944, the Estonian Olympic athletes competed as part of the USSR delegations at the Olympic Games from 1952 until 1988.

The NOC was renewed on 14 January 1989 when the Estonian Olympic Sports Conference passed the following resolution: "to resume the activity of the Estonian Olympic Committee founded in 1923". The continuity concept became the foundation of the activity of the restored Estonian Olympic Committee since, although it could not act 'de facto' for 50 years, it never ceased its activity 'de jure'. On the same day, the first members of the renewed NOC were elected, Arnold Green and Atko Viru. On 20 August 1991 the independence of the Republic of Estonia was proclaimed and by decision of the Executive Board of the International Olympic Committee, at the board session in Berlin on 18 September 1991, the EOK was reintegrated into the Olympic Movement on 11 November 1991.

In 1992 the IOC delegation led by president Juan Antonio Samaranch visited Estonia. Delegation members included Vice President of the IOC and Russian Olympic Committee president – Vitali Smirnov, IOC and Swedish Olympic Committee member – Gunnar Ericsson, President of the EOC – Jacques Rogge and Secretary General of the EOC and Italian National Olympic Committee – Mario Pescante.

The 1992 Winter Olympics in Albertville, France was the first time since 1936 that the nation had competed as an independent nation at the Olympic Games. In the Games between, the Estonian athletes competed under the flag of the Soviet Union.

== Structure ==
=== Current NOC leadership ===
Elected on 18 June 2026.

President

- Erich Teigamägi

Vice Presidents

- Anne Rei
- Leho Haldna
- Priit Sarapuu
- Tõnu Tõniste

Secretary General

- Kristo Tohver

Executive Board

17 members. Ex-officio – EOK President, vice Presidents, Estonian IOC members, and the Chairman of the EOC Athletes' Commission. Elected members – representatives of Olympic sports, representatives of non-olympic sports.

- Erich Teigamägi – EOK President
- Anne Rei – Vice President
- Leho Haldna – Vice President
- Priit Sarapuu – Vice President
- Tõnu Tõniste – Vice President
- Johanna Talihärm – Member of the IOC
- Allar Raja – Chairman of the EOC Athletes' Commission
- Natalja Inno
- Hanno Pevkur
- Raivo Rand
- Martti Hääl
- Mihkel Mardna
- Toomas Tõnise
- Assar Jõepera
- Erki Nool
- Mihhail Kõlvart
- Saskia Alusalu

=== Former presidents ===
- Karl Friedrich Akel (1924–1931) – EOC Chairman
- Johan Laidoner (1934–1940) – EOC Chairman
- Arnold Green (1989–1997)
- Tiit Nuudi (1997–2001)
- Mart Siimann (2001–2012)
- Neinar Seli (2012–2016)
- Urmas Sõõrumaa (2016–2024)
- Kersti Kaljulaid (2024–2026)

=== IOC members ===
- Karl Friedrich Akel (1927–1932)
- Joakim Puhk (1936–1942)
- Johanna Talihärm (2026–2034)

Members

As of 27 April 2026 members of the Estonian Olympic Committee are:

National Sport Federations

- Estonian Air Sports Federation
- Estonian Archery Federation
- Estonian Athletics Association
- Estonian Autosport Union
- Estonian Badminton Association
- Estonian Basketball Association
- Estonian Biathlon Union
- Estonian Billiard Association
- Estonian Bodybuilding and Fitness Federation
- Estonian Bowling Association
- Estonian Boxing Association
- Estonian Canoeing Federation
- Estonian Casting Federation
- Estonian Cheerleading Union
- Estonian Chess Federation
- Estonian Climbing Association
- Estonian Cricket Association
- Estonian Crossbow Union
- Estonian Curling Association
- Estonian Cyclists Union
- Estonian Darts Association
- Estonian Disc Golf Association
- Estonian Draughts Federation
- Estonian Equestrian Federation
- Estonian Fencing Association
- Estonian Floorball Union
- Estonian Flying Disc Federation
- Estonian Football Association
- Estonian Golf Association
- Estonian Gymnastics Federation
- Estonian Handball Association
- Estonian Hunting Sport Association
- Estonian Ice Hockey Association
- Estonian Indiaca Federation
- Estonian Judo Association
- Estonian Karate Federation
- Estonian Kickboxing Federation
- Estonian Luge Federation
- Estonian Modern Pentathlon Association
- Estonian Motorcycling Federation
- Estonian Muay Thai Federation
- Estonian Orienteering Federation
- Estonian Petanque Union
- Estonian Powerboating Union
- Estonian Powerlifting Federation
- Estonian Ramblers' Association
- Estonian Rollerskating Federation
- Estonian Rowing Association
- Estonian Rugby Union
- Estonian Sailing Union
- Estonian Sambo Union
- Estonian Shooting Sport Federation
- Estonian Skating Union
- Estonian Ski Association
- Estonian Sports and Traditional Wushu Federation
- Estonian Squash Federation
- Estonian Sumo Association
- Estonian Swimming Federation
- Estonian Table Tennis Association
- Estonian Taekwondo Federation
- Estonian Taekwon-do Union
- Estonian Tennis Association
- Estonian Tournament Bridge League
- Estonian Triathlon Association
- Estonian Underwater Federation
- Estonian Weightlifting Federation
- Estonian Volleyball Federation
- Estonian Wrestling Federation

Sport Associations

- Estonian Academic Sports Federation
- Estonian Association of Technology and Sports
- Estonian Coaches Association
- Estonian Federation for Company Sport
- Estonian Mixed Martial Arts Federation
- Estonian Nordic Walking Association
- Estonian Olympic Academy
- Estonian Paralympic Committee
- Estonian Police Sport Association
- Estonian School Sport Union
- Estonian Senior Sport and Sports Veterans Union
- Estonian Sport Federation of Firefighters
- Estonian Sports Association Jõud
- Estonian Sports Association Kalev
- Estonian Sports Association Põhjakotkas
- Estonian Sports History Association
- Estonian Sports Journalists' Association
- Estonian Sports Medicine Federation
- Special Olympics Estonia
- Sports for All Association

Regional Sport Associations

- East-Virumaa Regional Sports Association
- Harjumaa Regional Sports Association
- Hiiumaa Regional Sports Association
- Jõgevamaa Regional Sports Association Kalju
- Järvamaa Regional Sports Association
- Lääne Regional Sports Association Läänela
- Narva Sports Association
- Põlva Regional Sports Association
- Pärnu Sports Association
- Pärnumaa Regional Sports Association
- Rapla Regional Sports Association
- Saaremaa Regional Sports Association
- Tallinn Sports Association
- Tartu Sports Association
- Tartumaa Regional Sports Association

Individual members

- Andres Lipstok
- Erika Salumäe
- Erki Nool
- Gerd Kanter
- Irina Embrich
- Jaak Uudmäe
- Janika Mölder
- Kristina Šmigun-Vähi
- Mart Tarmak
- Neinar Seli
- Tiit Nuudi
- Toomas Tõnise
- Tõnu Endrekson
- Tõnu Laak
- Tõnu Tõniste
- Urmas Sõõrumaa

== See also ==
- Estonia at the Olympics
