= FEI World Cup Jumping 2009/2010 =

The FEI World Cup Jumping 2009/2010 was the 32nd edition of the premier international show jumping competition run by the FEI. The final was held at the Palexpo in Le Grand-Saconnex near Geneva, Switzerland from April 14, 2010 to April 18, 2010. Meredith Michaels-Beerbaum of Germany was the defending champion, having won the final the previous year (2008/09) in Las Vegas, Nevada, United States.

The champion of the World Cup Final of this year is Marcus Ehning, also of Germany.

== Arab League ==
Location	Dates	Event	Winner
Al-Budayyi', Bahrain	February 19, 2009 – February 21, 2009	CSI**-W	(United Arab Emirates) Mohammed Ghanem Al-Hajri on Shakira
Riyadh, Saudi Arabia	February 25, 2009 – February 28, 2009	CSI***-W	(Saudi Arabia) Prince Abdullah Bin Metab Al-Saud on Mobily Saudia
Kuwait, Kuwait	March 5, 2009 – March 7, 2009	CSI***-W	(United Arab Emirates) Sheikh Shakhboot Al Nahyan on Vitesse Greenfield
Damascus, Syria	March 20, 2009 – March 23, 2009	CSI****-W	(Saudi Arabia) Khaled Abdulaziz Al-Eid on Ayriyadh
Sharm el Sheikh, Egypt	October 1, 2009 – October 4, 2009	CSI**-W	(Saudi Arabia) Prince Abdullah Bin Metab Al-Saud on Mobily Lil Majd
Sharm el Sheikh, Egypt	October 8, 2009 – October 11, 2009	CSI***-W	(Saudi Arabia) Prince Abdullah Bin Metab Al-Saud on Mobily Lil Majd
Tripoli, Libya	October 20, 2009 – October 22, 2009	CSI***-W	(Republic of Ireland) Cian O'Connor on Irish Independent Echo Beach
Riyadh, Saudi Arabia	November 3, 2009 – November 7, 2009	CSI***-W	(Saudi Arabia) Abdullah Waleed Sharbatly on Quebec
Damascus, Syria	March 20, 2009 – March 23, 2009	CSI**-W	(Saudi Arabia) Abdullah Waleed Sharbatly on Quebec
Doha, Qatar	December 20, 2009 – December 23, 2009	CSI****-W	(Bahrain) Ali bin Khalid Al Thani on Santos
Dubai, United Arab Emirates	January 7, 2010 – January 9, 2010	CSI***-W	(Saudi Arabia) Abdullah Waleed Sharbatly on Goldex
Abu Dhabi, United Arab Emirates	January 14, 2010 – January 16, 2010	CSI***-W	(Saudi Arabia) Kamal Abdullah Bahamdan on Mashalla Rivaal
Sharjah, United Arab Emirates	January 21, 2010 – January 23, 2010	CSI**-W	(Saudi Arabia) Abdullah Waleed Sharbatly on Goldex

== Caucasian League ==
Location	Dates	Event	Winner
Baku, Azerbaijan	May 8, 2009 – May 12, 2009	CSI**-W	(Bulgaria) Veneto Tenev on Bahar
(Georgia (country)) Tbilisi, Georgia	October 1, 2009 – October 4, 2009	CSI**-W	(Georgia (country)) Shalva Gachechiladze on Saturn
Baku, Azerbaijan	December 8, 2009 – December 10, 2009	CSI**-W	(Russia) Natalia Simonia on Grom

== Central Asian League ==
Location	Dates	Event	Winner
Tashkent, Uzbekistan	April 23, 2009 – April 26, 2009	CSIO*-W	(Kyrgyzstan) Andrei Shalohin on Charlize
Bishkek, Kyrgyzstan	May 14, 2009 – May 17, 2009	CSIO*-W	(Kyrgyzstan) Andrei Shalohin on Charlize
Astana, Kazakhstan	July 2, 2009 – July 5, 2009	CSIO*-W	(Kyrgyzstan) Andrei Shalohin on Charlize

== Central European League ==
=== North Sub-League ===
Location	Dates	Event	Winner
Chernyakhovsk, Russia	May 14, 2009 – May 15, 2009	CSI***-W	(Germany) Holger Wulschner on Cefalo
Ruila, Kernu Parish, Estonia	July 10, 2009 – July 12, 2009	CSI*-W	(Russia) Arseny Shpakovskiy on Campino
Riga, Latvia	July 17, 2009 – July 19, 2009	CSI**-W	(Latvia) Andis Varna on Grand Libero
Bratislava, Slovakia	August 6, 2009 – August 9, 2009	CSIO***-W	(France) Stephane Lafouge on Gabelou des Ores
Donetsk, Ukraine	September 10, 2009 – September 13, 2009	CSI***-W	(Germany) Tim Hoster on Top Secret
Moscow, Russia	September 18, 2009 – September 20, 2009	CSI***-W	(Russia) Arseny Shpakovskiy on Campino
Leszno, Poland	November 12, 2009 – November 15, 2009	CSI***-W	(Estonia) Rein Pill on Virgin Express
Warsaw, Poland	March 12, 2010 – March 14, 2010	CSI***-W	(Netherlands) Jur Vrieling on Nerina

=== South Sub-League ===
Location	Dates	Event	Winner
Markopoulo Olympic Equestrian Centre, Greece	May 1, 2009 – May 3, 2009	CSI**-W	(Greece) Elina Dendrinou on W.K. Liberty 0000
Lipica, Slovenia	May 22, 2009 – May 24, 2009	CSI**-W	(Italy) Davide Kainich on JHG Popey
Lipica, Slovenia	May 29, 2009 – May 31, 2009	CSI**-W	(Turkey) Avni Atabek on Walthery du Ri d'Asse
Piatra Neamţ, Romania	June 4, 2009 – June 7, 2009	CSIO**-W	(Hungary) Ivelin Valev on Equitta
Albena, Bulgaria	June 11, 2009 – June 14, 2009	CSIO**-W	(Bulgaria) Angel Niagolov on Rue Blanche du Gibet
Istanbul, Turkey	September 3, 2009 – September 6, 2009	CSIO***-W	(Turkey) Sencer Horasan on Lavaro
Markopoulo Olympic Equestrian Centre, Greece	October 1, 2009 – October 4, 2009	CSIO***-W	(Belgium) José Thiry on Roxette de L'Obstination

=== Final ===
Location	Dates	Event	Winner
Tallinn, Estonia	March 18, 2010 – March 21, 2010	CSI-W League Final	(Estonia) Tiit Kivisild on Cinnamon

== Japan League ==
Location	Dates	Event	Winner
Osaka, Japan	April 4, 2009	CSI*-W	(Japan) Tadayoshi Hayashi on Telexio'
Nasu, Japan	May 17, 2009	CSI*-W	(Japan) Daisuke Kawaguchi on Kronos
Chiba, Japan	July 6, 2008	CSI*-W	(Japan) Ryuma Hirota on Yamato
Osaka, Japan	June 18, 2009 – June 21, 2009	CSI*-W	(Japan) Ryuma Hirota on Yackkle
Minamisōma, Japan	July 3, 2009 – July 5, 2009	CSI*-W	(Japan) Ryuma Hirota on Yackkle
Gotemba, Japan	September 5, 2009	CSI*-W	(Japan) Seiji Ninomiya on Casablanca
Fuji, Japan	October 17, 2009	CSI*-W	(Japan) Satoshi Hirao on Arizona
Osaka, Japan	October 24, 2009	CSI*-W	(Japan) Daisuke Kawaguchi on Kronos

== North American League ==
=== East Coast ===
Events of the former North American League (United States East Coast) and the East Coast events of the former North American League (Canada) are now part of the North American League - East Coast.

Location	Dates	Event	Winner
Blainville, Quebec, Canada	June 15, 2009 – June 19, 2009	CSI**-W	(Venezuela) Andres Rodriguez on Secret
Bromont, Quebec, Canada	June 22, 2009 – June 26, 2009	CSI**-W	(United States) Mario Deslauriers on Ardeche van de Zelm
Bridgehampton, New York, United States	August 23, 2009 – August 30, 2009	CSI****-W	(United States) McLain Ward on Sapphire
Halton Hills, Ontario, Canada	September 2, 2009 – September 6, 2009	CSI**-W	(Colombia) Daniel Bluman on Fatalis Fatum
Moreland Hills, Ohio, United States	September 9, 2009 – September 13, 2009	CSI**-W	cancelled
Lexington, Kentucky, United States	September 16, 2009 – September 20, 2009	CSI**-W	(Canada) Mac Cone on Ole
Caledon, Ontario, Canada	September 23, 2009 – September 27, 2009	CSI***-W	(Canada) Hugh Graham on Executive Privilege 3E
Harrisburg, Pennsylvania, United States	October 15, 2009 – October 17, 2009	CSI**-W	(Brazil) Rodrigo Pessoa on Let's Fly
Washington, D.C., United States	October 20, 2009 – October 25, 2009	CSI****-W	(United States) Todd Minikus on Alaska
Syracuse, New York, United States	October 28, 2009 – November 1, 2009	CSI****-W	(Republic of Ireland) Darragh Kenny on Obelix
Toronto, Ontario, Canada	November 6, 2009 – November 15, 2009	CSI****-W	(Canada) Jill Henselwood on Bottom Line
Wellington, Florida, United States	November 25, 2009 – November 29, 2009	CSI**-W	(United States) Hillary Dobbs on Quincy B
Green Cove Springs, Florida, United States	January 15, 2010 – January 16, 2010	CSI**-W	(Republic of Ireland) Darragh Kenny on Obelix
Wellington, Florida, United States	February 10, 2010 – February 14, 2010	CSI***-W	(Venezuela) Pablo Barrios on G and C Lagran
Wellington, Florida, United States	March 10, 2010 – March 14, 2010	CSI***-W	(Brazil) Rodrigo Pessoa on Night Train
Tampa, Florida, United States	March 31, 2010 – April 4, 2010	CSI**-W	(United States) Margie Goldstein-Engle on Indigo

=== West Coast ===
Events of the former Mexican League, the former North American League (United States West Coast) and the West Coast events of the former North American League (Canada) are now part of the North American League - West Coast.

Location	Dates	Event	Winner
Langley, British Columbia, Canada	August 12, 2009 – August 16, 2009	CSI**-W	(United States) Rich Fellers on Flexible
Del Mar, California, United States	August 26, 2009 – August 30, 2009	CSI**-W	(United States) Ashlee Bond on Cadett
San Juan Capistrano, California, United States	September 9, 2009 – September 13, 2009	CSI**-W	(Canada) Becky Smith on Galan
Burbank, California, United States	September 16, 2009 – September 20, 2009	CSI**-W	(United States) Ashlee Bond on Cadett
Del Mar, California, United States	Oktober 14, 2009 – Oktober 18, 2009	CSI**-W	(United States) Rich Fellers on Flexible
Monterrey, Mexico	October 27, 2008 – November 1, 2009	CSI****-W	cancelled
Las Vegas, Nevada, United States	October 28, 2008 – November 1, 2009	CSI**-W	cancelled
Rancho Murieta, California, United States	November 3, 2009 – November 8, 2009	CSI**-W	(United States) Rich Fellers on Flexible
Burbank, California, United States	November 11, 2009 – November 15, 2009	CSI**-W	(United States) Richard Spooner on Apache
Balvanera, Corregidora, Mexico	November 26, 2009 – November 29, 2009	CSI***-W	cancelled
Thermal, California, United States	February 2, 2010 – February 7, 2010	CSI**-W	(United States) McLain Ward on Phillipa
Thermal, California, United States	February 9, 2010 – February 14, 2010	CSI**-W	(Canada) John Pearce on Son of a gun
Thermal, California, United States	February 23, 2010 – February 28, 2010	CSI**-W	(Canada) John Pearce on Chianto
Thermal, California, United States	March 2, 2010 – March 7, 2010	CSI**-W	(United States) Joie Gatlin on Quick Dollar
Balvanera, Corregidora, Mexico	March 18, 2010 – March 21, 2010	CSI***-W	cancelled
San Juan Capistrano, California, United States	March 31, 2010 – April 4, 2010	CSI**-W	(Canada) John Pearce on Chianto

== Pacific League ==
=== Australia ===
Location	Dates	Event	Winner
Sydney, Australia	April 14, 2009	CSI*-W	(Australia) Jamie Winning on Vangelo des Hazalles
Sydney, Australia	May 3, 2009	CSI*-W	(Australia) Chris Chugg on Vivant
Toowoomba, Australia	August 2, 2009	CSI*-W	(Australia) Chris Chugg on Vivant
Brisbane, Australia	August 11, 2009	CSI*-W	cancelled
Caboolture, Australia	August 16, 2009	CSI*-W	(Australia) Chris Chugg on Vivant
Gawler, Australia	August 30, 2009	CSI*-W	(Australia) Wendy Schaeffer on Koyuna Sun Set
Adelaide, Australia	September 10, 2009	CSI*-W	(Australia) Rebecca Allen on Ted
Glenelg, Australia	September 13, 2009	CSI*-W	cancelled
Melbourne, Australia	September 19, 2009	CSI*-W	(Australia) Chris Chugg on Vivant
Perth, Australia	September 28, 2009	CSI*-W	cancelled
Brigadoon, Australia	October 18, 2009	CSI*-W	cancelled
Shepparton, Australia	November 14, 2009	CSI*-W	(Australia) Chris Chugg on Vivant
Wodonga, Australia	November 21, 2009	CSI*-W	(Australia) Chris Chugg on Vivant
Melbourne, Australia	November 20, 2009 – November 22, 2009	CSI*-W	cancelled
Sale, Australia	November 29, 2009	CSI*-W	(Australia) Paul Athanasoff on Wirragulla Nicklaus
Sydney, Australia (League Final)	December 13, 2009	CSI*-W	(Australia) Chris Chugg on Vivant

=== New Zealand ===
Location	Dates	Event	Winner
Hastings, New Zealand	October 21, 2009 – October 23, 2009	CSI*-W	(New Zealand) Katie McVean on Delphi
Kihikihi, New Zealand	November 6, 2009 – November 8, 2009	CSI*-W	(New Zealand) Anna Trent on Levitation NZPH
Tauranga, New Zealand	December 4, 2009 – December 6, 2009	CSI*-W	(New Zealand) Julie Davey on Air Hill the Rajah
Feilding, New Zealand	December 12, 2009	CSI*-W	(New Zealand) Katie McVean on Corofino II
Taupō, New Zealand	December 17, 2009 – December 19, 2009	CSI*-W	(New Zealand) Anna Trent on Nicalette NZPH
Dannevirke, New Zealand	January 8, 2010 – January 10, 2010	CSI*-W	(New Zealand) Ike Unsworth on Seremonie VDL
Woodhill Sands, New Zealand	January 16, 2010 – January 17, 2010	CSI*-W	(New Zealand) Katie McVean on Delphi
Gisborne, New Zealand (League Final)	January 29, 2010 – January 30, 2010	CSI*-W	(New Zealand) Katie McVean on Delphi

== South African League ==
Location	Dates	Event	Winner
Pietermaritzburg, South Africa	April 22, 2009 – April 25, 2009	CSI*-W	(South Africa) Dominey Alexander on Alzu Barracuda
Midrand, South Africa	May 28, 2009 – May 31, 2009	CSI*-W	(South Africa) Ashlee Hausberger on Quinsey
Durban, South Africa	August 13, 2009 – August 16, 2009	CSI*-W	(South Africa) Shaun Neill on Gold Rush
Pretoria, South Africa	August 28, 2009 – August 30, 2009	CSI*-W	(South Africa) Dominey Alexander on Alzu Barracuda
Parys, South Africa	September 10, 2009 – September 13, 2009	CSI*-W	cancelled
Cape Town, South Africa	November 19, 2009 – November 22, 2009	CSI*-W	(South Africa) Shaun Neill on Gold Rush

== South American League ==
Location	Dates	Event	Winner
Porto Alegre, Brazil	April 29, 2009 – May 3, 2009	CSI***-W	(Brazil) Stephan de Freitas Barcha on Krissnee du Defey
Buenos Aires (Sol de Mayo), Argentina	May 14, 2009 – May 17, 2009	CSI*-W	(Chile) Bernardo Naveillan on Aquino
São Paulo, Brazil	September 2, 2009 – September 6, 2009	CSI**-W	(Brazil) José Roberto Reynoso Fernandez Filho on Rochefort Jmen
São Paulo, Brazil	Oktober 8, 2009 – Oktober 11, 2009	CSI***-W	(Brazil) Karina Harbich Johannpeter on Donna D
Haras El Capricho, Capilla del Señor, Argentina	November 3, 2009 – November 3, 200*	CSIO**-W	(Argentina) Leandro Moschini on Gama Zarello Z
Rio de Janeiro, Brazil	November 19, 2009 – November 22, 2009	CSI*-W	(Brazil) Yuri Mansur Guerios on Ideal de Balia

== South East Asia League ==
Location	Dates	Event	Winner
Putrajaya, Malaysia	June 18, 2009 – June 21, 2009	CSI*-W	cancelled
Kuang, Malaysia	June 23, 2009 – June 26, 2009	CSI*-W	(Malaysia) Qabil Ambak Mahamad Fathil on Amadeus van de Boswinning
Kuang, Malaysia	August 7, 2009 – August 9, 2009	CSI*-W	(Malaysia) Qabil Ambak Mahamad Fathil on Amadeus van de Boswinning
Kuang, Malaysia	August 13, 2009 – August 16, 2009	CSI*-W	(Malaysia) Syed Mohsin Almohdzar on King Power Aladdin
Putrajaya, Malaysia	October 1, 2009 – October 4, 2009	CSI*-W	cancelled

== Western European League ==
Location	Dates	Event	Winner
Oslo, Norway	October 9, 2009 – October 11, 2009	CSI*****-W	(Switzerland) Daniel Etter on Peu a Peu
Helsinki, Finland	October 15, 2009 – October 18, 2009	CSI****-W	(Switzerland) Daniel Etter on Peu a Peu
Lyon, France	October 29, 2009 – November 1, 2009	CSI*****-W	(Switzerland) Beat Mändli on Louis
Verona, Italy	November 5, 2009 – November 8, 2009	CSI*****-W	(United Kingdom) Michael Whitaker on Amai
Stuttgart, Germany	November 18, 2009 – November 22, 2009	CSI*****-W	(Germany) Ludger Beerbaum on Gotha
London, United Kingdom	December 15, 2009 – December 21, 2009	CSI*****-W	(Netherlands) Eric van der Vleuten on Tomboy
Mechelen, Belgium	December 26, 2009 – December 30, 2009	CSI*****-W	(Japan) Eiken Sato on Cartoon Z
Leipzig, Germany	January 21, 2010 – January 24, 2010	CSI*****-W	(Republic of Ireland) Jessica Kürten on Libertina
Zürich, Switzerland	January 29, 2010 – January 31, 2010	CSI*****-W	(Switzerland) Steve Guerdat on Tresor
Bordeaux, France	February 5, 2010 – February 7, 2010	CSI*****-W	(Germany) Marcus Ehning on Leconte
Vigo, Spain	February 12, 2010 – February 14, 2010	CSI*****-W	(Australia) Edwina Alexander on Socrates
Gothenburg, Sweden	February 25, 2010 – February 28, 2010	CSI*****-W	(Republic of Ireland) Jessica Kürten on Libertina
's-Hertogenbosch, Netherlands	March 25, 2010 – March 28, 2010	CSI*****-W	(Sweden) Rolf-Göran Bengtsson on Casall

== World Cup Final ==
Location	Dates	Event	Winner
Palexpo, Le Grand-Saconnex near Geneva, Switzerland	April 14, 2010 – April 18, 2010	CSI-W Final	(Germany) Marcus Ehning on Noltes Küchengirl and Plot Blue
