= 2010 FEI World Cup Jumping final =

Horse sport competition

The 2010 FEI World Cup Jumping Final was the final of the FEI World Cup Jumping 2009/2010. It was the 32nd final of the FEI World Cup Jumping show jumping series and was held at the Palexpo in Le Grand-Saconnex near Geneva, Switzerland, from April 14 to April 18, 2010.

Meredith Michaels-Beerbaum of Germany was the defending champion, having won the 2009 final in Las Vegas, Nevada. She didn't start at the 2010 FEI World Cup Jumping Final because of the birth of her daughter shortly previous to this event.

The champion of the 2010 FEI World Cup Jumping Final is Marcus Ehning of Germany, who started with the horses Noltes Küchengirl and Plot Blue in this World Cup Final.

== Participating riders ==
| World Cup League | Number of competitors of this league eligible to start in this World Cup Final | competitors who take part in this World Cup Final |
|---|---|---|
| Arab League | 2 | (Saudi Arabia) Abdullah Sharbatly (Saudi Arabia) HRH Prince Abdullah Bin Metab Al-Saud |
| Caucasian League | 1 | no competitors |
| Central Asian League | 1 | no competitors |
| Central European League | 3 | (Estonia) Tilt Kivisild (Estonia) Rein Pill (Lithuania) Benas Gutkauskas |
| Japan League | 1 | no competitors |
| North American League | 2 Canadian competitors | (Canada) Karen Cudmore |
| North American League | 2 Mexican competitors | (Mexico) Alberto Martinez |
| North American League | 10 US-American competitors | (United States) McLain Ward (United States) Mario Deslauriers (United States) Michelle Spadone (United States) Hillary Dobbs (United States) Lauren Hough (United States) Ken Berkley (United States) Todd Minikus (United States) Rich Fellers (United States) Joie Gatlin (United States) Richard Spooner |
| North American League | | (Republic of Ireland) Darragh Kenny ° (Russia) Ljubov Kochetova ° (Venezuela) Andres Rodriguez ° |
| Pacific League | 2 competitors from Australian sub-league | (Australia) Chris Chugg |
| Pacific League | 1 competitor from New Zealand sub-league | no competitors |
| South African League | 1 | no competitors |
| South American League | 3 | no competitors |
| South East Asia League | 1 | no competitors |
| Western European League | 18 | (Germany) Marco Kutscher (Switzerland) Pius Schwizer (Australia) Edwina Alexander ° (Germany) Marcus Ehning (Brazil) Rodrigo Pessoa ° (Germany) Ludger Beerbaum (France) Kevin Staut (Switzerland) Beat Mändli (Germany) Philipp Weishaupt (France) Patrice Deleveau (France) Penelope Leprevost (United Kingdom) Michael Whitaker (Switzerland) Daniel Etter (Sweden) Svante Johansson (Portugal) Luciana Diniz (Republic of Ireland) Dermott Lennon (Italy) Natale Chiaudani (Switzerland) Steve Guerdat (Netherlands) Albert Zoer (Sweden) Rolf-Göran Bengtsson |
| participants at invitation of the host country | 2 | (Switzerland) Niklaus Schurtenberger (Switzerland) Jane Richard |
| defending champion | 1 | did not start |

° extra competitor (Extra competitors are riders, who live in a country, which is not part of the World Cup League of the country of this riders nationality. These riders are at first part of the World Cup League of the country in which they live. At the end of the season this riders deducted from the final score of this league. If they have just as many or more points as the last qualified rider, they have the chance to start at the World Cup Final.)

(Republic of Ireland) Jessica Kürten canceled her participation at the World Cup final because of a training accident. Also (Brazil) Yuri Mansur Guerios, second placed rider in the South American League could not start at the World Cup Final. He lost his World Cup horse Ideal de Balia because of colic.

== Results ==
=== Final I ===
Thursday, April 15, 2010 - 7:15 pm to ca. 9:00 pm
Speed and Handiness Competition

| | Rider | Horse | Time | World Cup Points (only from the World Cup Final) |
|---|---|---|---|---|
| 1 | (United States) Rich Fellers | Flexible | 70.63 s + 0 Penalty s. = 70.63 | 44 |
| 2 | (United States) McLain Ward | Sapphire | 71.13 s + 0 Penalty s. = 71.13 | 42 |
| 3 | (Brazil) Rodrigo Pessoa | Let's Fly | 72.36 s + 0 Penalty s. = 72.36 | 41 |

=== Final II ===
Friday, April 16, 2010 - 7:15 pm to ca. 9:30 pm
Competition with one jump off, Round I not against the clock, jump-off against the clock

| | Rider | Horse | Round 1 | Jump-off | | World Cup Points (only from the World Cup Final) |
| | Rider | Horse | Penalties | Penalties | Time (s) | World Cup Points (only from the World Cup Final) |
|---|---|---|---|---|---|---|
| 1 | (Switzerland) Steve Guerdat | Tresor V | 0 | 0 | 36.12 | 44 |
| 2 | (United States) McLain Ward | Sapphire | 0 | 0 | 37.13 | - |
| 2 | (United States) Mario Deslauriers | Urico | 0 | 0 | 37.50 | 42 |
| 3 | (Germany) Marcus Ehning | Plot Blue | 0 | 0 | 38.85 | 41 |

(Saudi Arabia) Abdullah Al Sharbatly didn't start in Final II of the 2010 FEI World Cup Jumping Final.

=== Final III ===
Sunday, April 18, 2010 - 1:30 pm to ca. 4:40 pm Competition over two different rounds, both not against the clock

| | Rider | Horse | Round 1 | Round 2 |
| | Rider | Horse | Penalties | Penalties |
|---|---|---|---|---|
| 1 | (United States) Richard Spooner | Cristallo | 0 | 0 |
| 1 | (Republic of Ireland) Dermott Lennon | Hallmark Elite | 0 | 0 |
| 1 | (Germany) Ludger Beerbaum | Gotha | 0 | 0 |
| 4 | (Switzerland) Jane Richard | Zekina Z | 4 | 0 |
| 4 | (United States) Lauren Hough | Quick Study | 0 | 4 |
| 4 | (Australia) Chris Chugg | Vivant | 4 | 0 |
| 4 | (Switzerland) Pius Schwizer | Carlina | 4 | 0 |
| 4 | (Germany) Marcus Ehning | Plot Blue | 4 | 0 |
| 4 | (Portugal) Luciana Diniz | Winningmood | 0 | 4 |

=== Final result ===
| | Rider | Horse/ Horses | Final I | Final II | World Cup Points (only from Final I and Final II) TOTAL | World Cup Points, converted in Penalties | Final III | Penalties (Total) | Jump-off | |
| | Rider | Horse/ Horses | World Cup Points | World Cup Points | World Cup Points (only from Final I and Final II) TOTAL | World Cup Points, converted in Penalties | Penalties | Penalties (Total) | Penalties | Time (s) |
|---|---|---|---|---|---|---|---|---|---|---|
| 1 | (Germany) Marcus Ehning | Noltes Küchengirl and Plot Blue | 34 | 41 | 75 | 2 | 4 | 6 | | |
| 2 | (Germany) Ludger Beerbaum | Gotha | 27 | 38 | 65 | 7 | 0 | 7 | | |
| 2 | (Switzerland) Pius Schwizer | Ulysse and Carlina | 33 | 40 | 73 | 3 | 4 | 7 | | |

Sapphire, the horse ridden by (United States) McLain Ward, has been eliminated from the second round of the FEI World Cup Final and disqualified from the rest of the event following a positive hypersensitivity test. The FEI appointed veterinarian stressed that there was no indication or evidence of any malpractice by McLain Ward or any member of the team.

In July 2010 the FEI and McLain Ward agreed to avoid extensive litigations, that Sapphire was incorrectly eliminated. However, Sapphire’s disqualification from the final round of the World Cup remains in place. The FEI has also decided to develop mandatory guidelines for hypersensitivity tests.
