= Mart Siimann =

Prime Minister of Estonia from 1997 to 1999

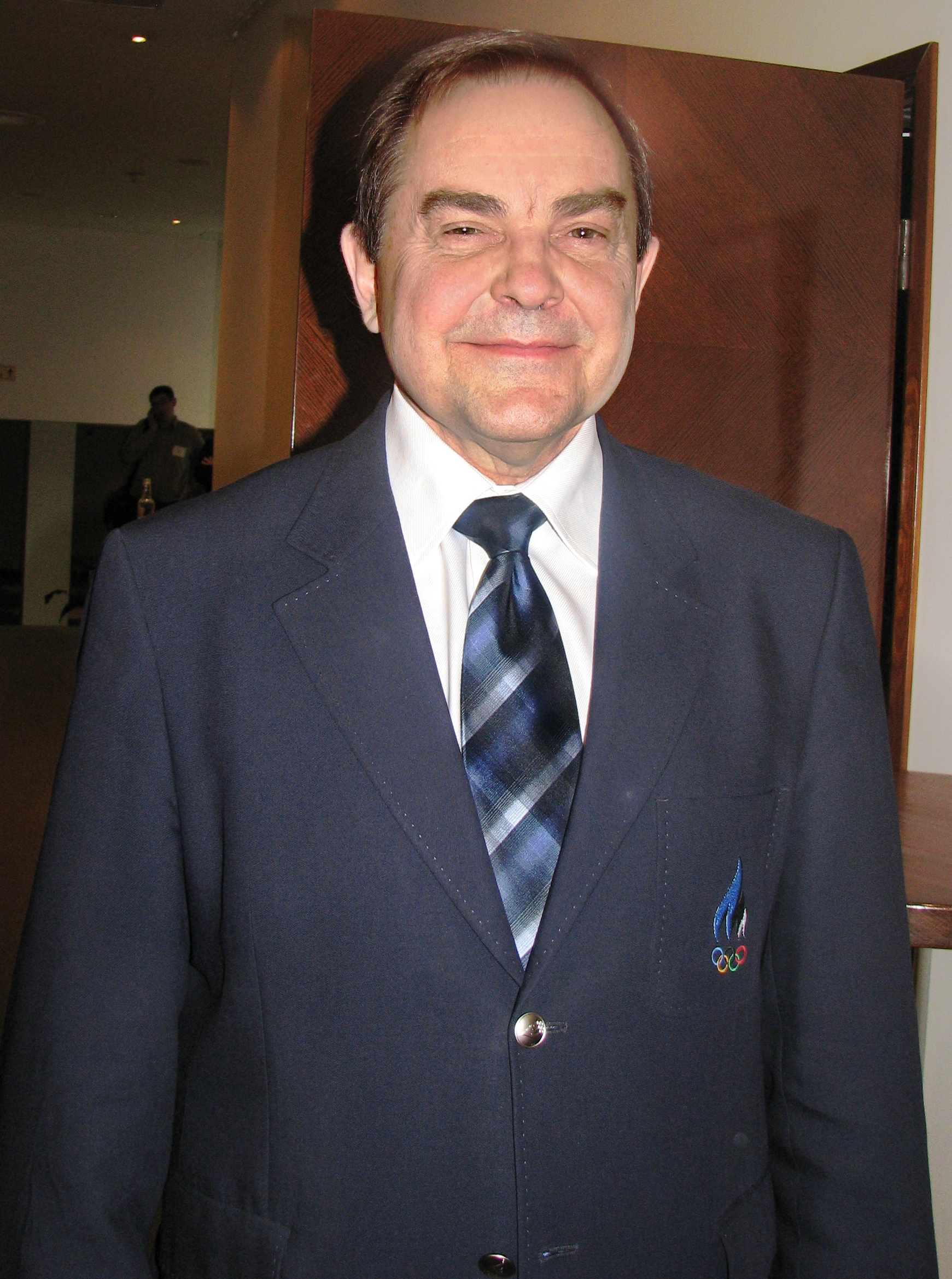
- Siimann in 2010

Prime Minister of Estonia
- In office 17 March 1997 – 25 March 1999
- President: Lennart Meri
- Preceded by: Tiit Vähi
- Succeeded by: Mart Laar

Personal details
- Born: 21 September 1946 (age 80) Kilingi-Nõmme, Estonia
- Party: Estonian Coalition Party
- Education: University of Tartu

Mart Siimann (born 21 September 1946) is an Estonian politician. He was Prime Minister of Estonia from 1997 to 1999 as a member of the Estonian Coalition Party, and President of the Estonian Olympic Committee from 2001 to 2012.

== Early life ==
Mart Siimann was born in Kilingi-Nõmme on 21 September 1946. He graduated from high school in Tartu in 1965 and received a degree in philology and psychology from the University of Tartu in 1971. He then began working as a government psychologist until 1975 when he became a senior researcher at the University of Tartu.

Siimann left his research job at the University of Tartu in 1982 to work in the media. He worked for Eesti Televisioon until 1987 when he became director of Eesti Raadio. He then returned to Eesti Televisioon as its leader in 1989, and the same year he was elected to serve on the Tallinn City Council. He left Eesti Televisioon in 1992 to be managing director of Advertising Television Co. TV, where he worked until 1995. He was elected to the VIII Riigikogu that year and became chair of the Estonian Coalition Party.

== Prime Minister of Estonia ==
Siimann succeeded Tiit Vähi as Prime Minister of Estonia on 17 March 1997. Siimann's Coalition Party formed a government with the Estonian Country People's Party. Also joining with the smaller Progressive Party, Siimann led a centrist coalition. Siimann advocated that Estonia join NATO and integrate with the Western European economy, but he also declared his intention to normalize Estonia–Russia relations.

Only half of his cabinet were party officials, with the other half made up of technocrats. This meant that there was very little shuffling of the cabinet, and there were three changes in total throughout Siimann's premiership, but it also meant that interest groups were able to secure influence among the politically-unaffiliated cabinet members. He also allowed civil servants to attend cabinet meetings and encouraged discourse between members of the cabinet. Siimann's term as prime minister ended on 25 March 1999 when the 1999 parliamentary election allowed Mart Laar to form a government.

== Post-premiership ==
After leaving politics, Siimann became president of the Estonian Olympic Committee in 2001, holding the position until 2012.

Political offices
Preceded by Tiit Vähi	Prime Minister of Estonia; 1997 - 1999	Succeeded by Mart Laar
Preceded by Tiit Nuudi	President of Estonian Olympic Committee; 2001–2012	Succeeded by Neinar Seli
