= EPU =

EPU or Epu may refer to:

== Universities ==
- Eastern Palm University, in Orlu, Nigeria
- Electric Power University, in Hanoi, Vietnam
- Erbil Polytechnic University, in Erbil, Iraqi Kurdistan
- European Peace University, in Stadtschlaining, Austria
- European Polytechnical University, in Pernik, Bulgaria

== Places ==
- Pärnu Airport (IATA airport code EPU), in Estonia
- Epu, now Jeppo, a village in Finland

== Groups, organizations ==
- Estonian Powerboating Union, a sports governing body
- European Payments Union, a defunct trade union
- European Parliamentary Union, a defunct political organization
- European Party of Ukraine, a political party in Ukraine

== Other uses ==
- Emergency power unit
- Toyota EPU, electric pickup concept car
