= Ülo Kesker =

Estonian draughts player and sport journalist (1934–2019)

Ülo Kesker (29 July 1934 – 31 July 2019) was an Estonian draughts player and sports journalist.

He was born in Haapsalu. In 1970 he graduated from the National University of Kharkiv with a degree in geography.

He started his draughts exercising under the guidance of Johannes Türn. He was multiple-times Estonian champion. 1962–1965 he was draughts and chess coach at sport club Jõud. Students: Õie Kundver (Kroon), Enno Eerma, Rein Vettner. 1955–1965 he was vice-chairman of Estonian Draughts Union.

Since 1994 he lived in Israel.
