= EJL =

EJL may refer to:

- Estonian Cyclists' Union (Estonian: Eesti Jalgratturite Liit)
- Estonian Football Association (Estonian: Eesti Jalgpalli Liit)
- Estonian Ice Hockey Association (Estonian: Eesti Jäähoki Liit)
- Estonian Judo Association (Estonian: Eesti Judoliit)
- Estonian Yachting Union (Estonian: Eesti Jahtklubide Liit)
