= Heiti Hääl =

Estonian entrepreneur and sport figure

Heiti Hääl (born 10 May 1963) is an Estonian entrepreneur and sport personality.

He was born in Tallinn. In 1986, he graduated from Tallinn University of Technology's Faculty of Engineering (Estonian: ehitusteaduskond).

Since 1994, he is a member of the board of Estonian Equestrian Federation (2000–2013 its chairman). He is one of the organizers of Tallinn International Horse Show, and its main sponsor. He is also the chairman of the board of AS Alexela Logistics.

Awards:

- 2017: Decoration of the Estonian Olympic Committee
- 2019: Order of the White Star, III class
- 2020: award "Spordisõber 2020"
