= Urmas Sõõrumaa =

Estonian entrepreneur

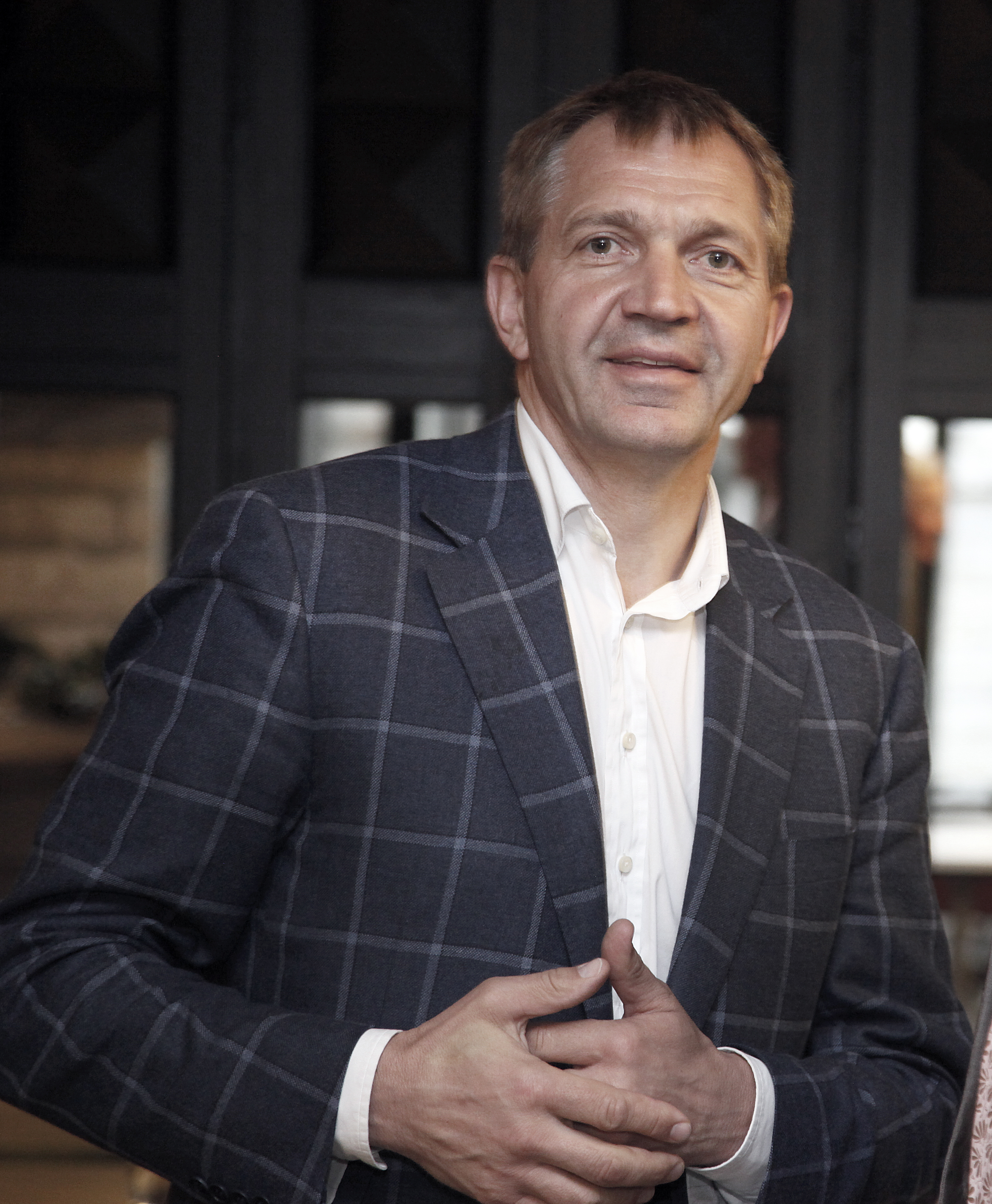
Urmas Sõõrumaa in 2013

Urmas Sõõrumaa (born 29 November 1961) is an Estonian businessman and sports personality.

He was born in Kohila. In 2000, he graduated from Tartu University's Faculty of Law.

Since 1999, he is the chairman of the council of the company U.S. Invest.

From 2007 to 2013, he was President of Estonian Tennis Association.

Since 2016, Sõõrumaa is President of Estonian Olympic Committee.

In 2003, he was awarded with Order of the White Star, III Class.
