= Heiti (given name) =

Estonian male given name

- Gender: Male
- Language: Estonian

Origin
- Region of origin: Estonia

Heiti is an Estonian-language male given name.

People named Heiti include:

- Heiti Hääl (born 1963), Estonian entrepreneur and sports personality
- Heiti Talvik (1904–1947), Estonian poet
