= Arnold Green (politician) =

Estonian politician

Member of the Supreme Soviet of the Estonian Soviet Socialist
- In office 1951–1990

President of Estonian Olympic Committee
- In office 1989–1997

Personal details
- Born: 30 August 1920; Riga, Latvia
- Died: 4 November 2011 (aged 91); Tallinn, Harjumaa, Estonia
- Political party: Communist Party of Estonia
- Occupation: Politician
- Awards: Olympic Order
- Military career
- Allegiance: Estonia
- Service / branch: Soviet Army
- Battles / wars: World War II
- Awards: Order of the Badge of Honour

Arnold Green (30 August 1920 – 4 November 2011) was a Soviet and Estonian politician and president of the Estonian Olympic Committee from 1989 to 1997, leader of the Estonian Olympic team for the Games in Albertville, Barcelona, Lillehammer and Atlanta and former President of the Estonian Wrestling League and the Estonian Skiing League.

== Biography ==
Born to an Estonian family in Riga, Latvia, in 1920, Green served in the Soviet Army in World War II, emerging as a Soviet political functionary of the Estonian Soviet Socialist Republic in the post-war years. From 1962 to 1990 he was the Minister of Foreign Affairs of the Estonian SSR. Green participated in the organization of the 1980 Olympic Games sailing regatta in Tallinn.

In 2001 he was awarded the Olympic Order by the IOC.

Green died in Tallinn, Estonia in 2011, aged 91.

== Honours and awards ==
- Five Orders of the Red Banner of Labour
- Order of the Badge of Honour
- Order of Friendship of Peoples
- Order of the Patriotic War 1st class
- Order of the Red Star
- Medal "For Courage"

Preceded by none	President of Estonian Olympic Committee; 1989–1997	Succeeded by Tiit Nuudi
