= Haal =

Haal may refer to:

- Renee Haal
- Hal (Sufism)

== See also ==
- Hääl
