= Estonian Wushu Kungfu Federation =

Sports governing body in Estonia

Estonian Wushu Kungfu Federation (abbreviation EWKF; Estonian: Eesti Wushu Kungfu Föderatsioon) is one of the sport governing bodies in Estonia which deals with wushu and kungfu.

EWKF was established in 2005. EWKF is a member of Estonian Olympic Committee.
