= Estonia at the FIS Nordic World Ski Championships =

Estonia (ISF code: EST) has competed at the FIS Nordic World Ski Championships since 1938. Estonia was not represented at the championships from 1940 to 1991 due to the Soviet occupation and started participated again from 1993.

== Years participated ==
- 1938
- 1993
- 1995
- 1997
- 1999
- 2001
- 2003
- 2005
- 2007
- 2009
- 2011
- 2013
- 2015
- 2017
- 2019

== Medalists ==
=== Cross country skiing ===
Medal	Name	Games	Event
Gold	Andrus Veerpalu	2001 Lahti	Men's 30 km
Gold	Kristina Šmigun	2003 Val di Fiemme	5 km + 5 km double pursuit
Gold	Andrus Veerpalu	2009 Liberec	Men's 15 km
Silver	Jaak Mae	2003 Val di Fiemme	Men's 15 km
Silver	Kristina Šmigun	1999 Ramsau	Women's 15 km
Silver	Kristina Šmigun	2003 Val di Fiemme	Women's 10 km
Silver	Kristina Šmigun	2003 Val di Fiemme	Women's 15 km
Silver	Andrus Veerpalu	1999 Ramsau	Men's 50 km
Bronze	Kristina Šmigun	1999 Ramsau	Women's 30 km
Bronze	Kristina Šmigun	2003 Val di Fiemme	Women's 30 km

== See also ==
- Estonia at Winter Olympic Games
- FIS Nordic World Ski Championships
- Eesti Suusaliit
