= Estonian Hunting Sport Association =

Sports governing body in Estonia

Estonian Hunting Sport Association (abbreviation EHSA; Estonian: Eesti Jahispordi Liit) is one of the sport governing bodies in Estonia which deals with hunting sport.

EHSA is a member of the Fédération Internationale de Tir aux Armes Sportives de Chasse (FITASC).

== See also ==
- Estonian Shooting Sport Federation
- Estonian Practical Shooting Association
