= Estonian Ramblers' Association =

Sports governing body in Estonia

Logo of the Estonian Ramblers' Association

Estonian Ramblers' Association (abbreviation ERA; Estonian: Eesti Matkaliit) is one of the sport governing bodies in Estonia which deals with different type of sport rambling (hiking), including climbing and mountaineering.

Flag of the Estonian Ramblers' Association

ERA is established about 1993. ERA is a member of European Ramblers' Association (ERA) and Estonian Olympic Committee.
