= Estonian Sumo Association =

Sports governing body in Estonia

Estonian Sumo Association (abbreviation ESA; Estonian: Eesti Sumoliit) is one of the sport governing bodies in Estonia which deals with sumo.

ESA is established in 1997. ESA is a member of International Sumo Federation (IFS) and Estonian Olympic Committee.
