= Estonian Bodybuilding and Fitness Federation =

Sports governing body in Estonia

Estonian Bodybuilding and Fitness Federation (abbreviation EBFF; Estonian: Eesti Kulturismi ja Fitnessi Liit) is one of the sport governing bodies in Estonia which deals with bodybuilding and fitness.

EBFF is established on 27 November 1997 in Tallinn. EBFF is a member of International Federation of Bodybuilding and Fitness (IFBB) and Estonian Olympic Committee.
