= Estonian Underwater Federation =

Sports governing body in Estonia

Estonian Underwater Federation (abbreviation EUF; Estonian: Eesti Allveeliit) is one of the sport governing bodies in Estonia which deals with underwater sports.

EUF is a member of World Underwater Federation (CMS) and Estonian Olympic Committee.
