= Estonian Gymnastics Federation =

Sports governing body in Estonia

Estonian Gymnastics Federation (abbreviation EGF; Estonian: Eesti Võimlemisliit) is the governing body of gymnastics in Estonia. It is a member of International Gymnastics Federation (FIG) and Estonian Olympic Committee.

The EGF was established on 14 March 1934 as Estonian Gymnasts' Federation (Estonian: Eesti Võimlejate Liit). During the Soviet occupation, it operated under the name Estonian SSR Rhythmic Gymnastics Federation (Estonian: Eesti NSV Iluvõimlemise Föderatsioon) and Estonian SSR Sport Gymnastics Federation (Estonian: Eesti NSV Sportvõimlemise Föderatsioon). The EGF was re-established on 10 December 1989.
