= Estonian Archery Federation =

Sports governing body in Estonia

Estonian Archery Federation (abbreviation EAF; Estonian: Eesti Vibuliit) is one of the sport governing bodies in Estonia which deals with archery.

EAF was established in 1991, being a successor to the Estonian SSR Archery Sport Federation (Estonian: Eesti NSV Vibuspordiföderatsioon). EAF is a member of the World Archery Federation (WA) and Estonian Olympic Committee.
