= Estonian Powerlifting Federation =

Sports governing body in Estonia

Estonian Powerlifting Federation (abbreviation EPF; Estonian: Eesti Jõutõsteliit) is one of the sport governing bodies in Estonia which deals with powerlifting.

EPF is established in 1993. Before 1993 the EPF existed as a section at Estonian Weightlifting Federation.

EPF is a member of European Powerlifting Federation (EPF) and International Powerlifting Federation (IPF).
