= Estonian Rollerskating Federation =

Sports governing body in Estonia

Estonian Rollerskating Federation (abbreviation ERF; Estonian: Eesti Rulluisuliit) is one of the sport governing bodies in Estonia which deals with roller sports (including rollerskating).

ERF is established on 27 January 1993. ERF is a member of International Roller Sports Federation (FIRS) and Estonian Olympic Committee.
