= Estonian Canoeing Federation =

Sports governing body in Estonia

Estonian Canoeing Federation (abbreviation ECF; Estonian: Eesti Aerutamisföderatsioon) is one of the sport governing bodies in Estonia which deals with canoeing.

ECF is established in 1951 as Estonian SSR Canoeing Federation (Estonian: Eesti NSV Aerutamisföderatsioon). ECF is re-established in 1990. ECF is a member of International Canoe Federation (ICF) and Estonian Olympic Committee.
