= Rein Pill =

Estonian equestrian

Rein Pill (born 13 January 1961 in Tallinn) is an Estonian equestrian.

Since 1979 he has been a member of Estonian national team and from 1986 to 1991 a member of Soviet team. In 1997, 2010, 2017 and 2018 he competed at FEI World Cup Jumping Final. From 1980 to 2018 he became forty-time Estonian champion in different equestrian sport disciplines. 2002 he won Tallinn International Horse Show.

Since 2017 he is a member of the board of Estonian Equestrian Federation.
