= Estonian Taekwondo Federation =

Sports governing body in Estonia

Estonian Taekwondo Federation (abbreviation ETF; Estonian: Eesti Taekwondo Liit) is one of the sport governing bodies in Estonia which deals with taekwondo.

ETF is established in 1992. ETF is a member of International Taekwon-Do Federation (ITF) and Estonian Olympic Committee.
