= Estonian Draughts Union =

Sports governing body in Estonia

The Estonian Draughts Union (abbreviation EDF; Estonian: Eesti Kabeliit) is one of the sport governing bodies in Estonia which deals with draughts.

The EDF was established on 22 April 1990 as a successor to the Estonian SSR Draughts Federation (Estonian: Eesti NSV Kabeföderatsioon). Since 1991, the EDF has been a member of the World Draughts Federation (FMJD), and since 1998 the European Draughts Federation (EDC). The EDF is also a member of the Estonian Olympic Committee.
