= Estonian Curling Association =

Sports governing body in Estonia

Estonian Curling Association (abbreviation ECA; Estonian: Eesti Curlingu Liit) is one of the sport governing bodies in Estonia which deals with curling. It was established in 2002. The president of ECA is Rainer Vakra.

ECA is a member of World Curling Federation and Estonian Olympic Committee.
