= Estonian Motorcycling Federation =

Sports governing body in Estonia

Estonian Motorcycling Federation (abbreviation EMF; Estonian: Eesti Mootorrattaspordi Föderatsioon) is one of the sport governing bodies in Estonia which deals with motorcycling.

EMF history dates back to 1921 when Estonian Auto Club (Estonian: Eesti Autoklubi) was established. One of the section of this club was motorcycling section. Since 1932 this section was a member of International Motorcycling Federation (FIM).

EMF was re-established in 1992. Since 2001, EMF is also a member of Estonian Olympic Committee.
