= Mart Tarmak =

Estonian diplomat and sport personnel

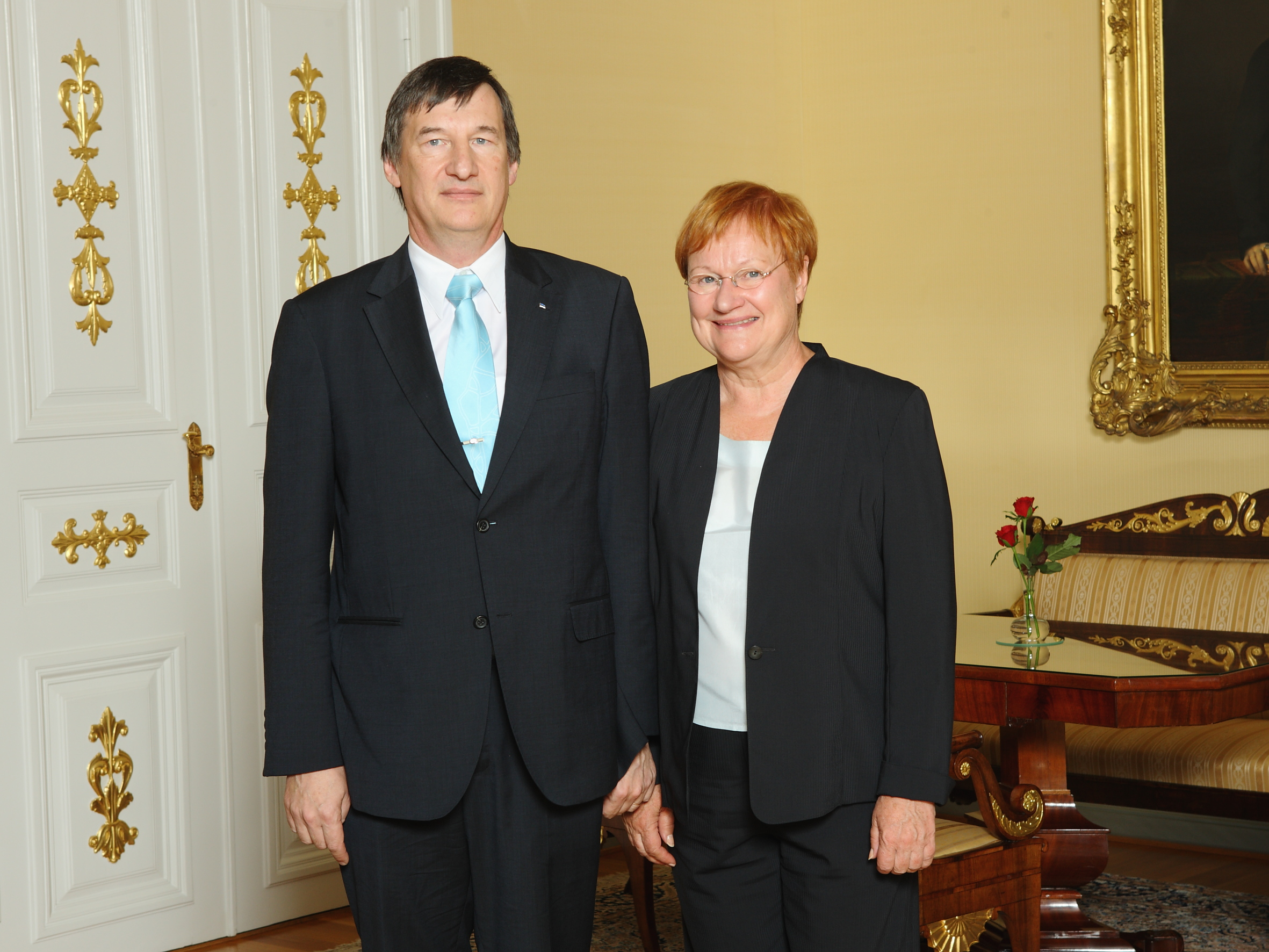
Mart Tarmak and Tarja Halonen in 2010

Mart Tarmak (until 1976 Mart Muttikas; born on 10 April 1955 in Tallinn) is an Estonian diplomat and sport personnel.

He graduated from Tallinn 21st Secondary School in 1973 and with a degree in chemistry from University of Tartu in 1978. He later studied Lithuanian and journalism at Vilnius University and Portuguese at the University of Lisbon. Since 1989 he is a member of Estonian Olympic Committee.

Diplomatic posts:

- 2006-2010 Ambassador of Estonia in Portugal
- 2008-2011 Ambassador of Estonia in Morocco
- 2010-2014 Ambassador of Estonia in Finland
- 2014-2020 Ambassador of Estonia in Brazil
- 2015-2021 Ambassador of Estonia in Peru
- 2015-2022 Ambassador of Estonia in Chile
- 2017-2021 Ambassador of Estonia in Colombia

In 2005 he was awarded with Order of the Estonian Red Cross, V class.
