= Toomas Tõnise =

Estonian modern pentathlete and sport personnel

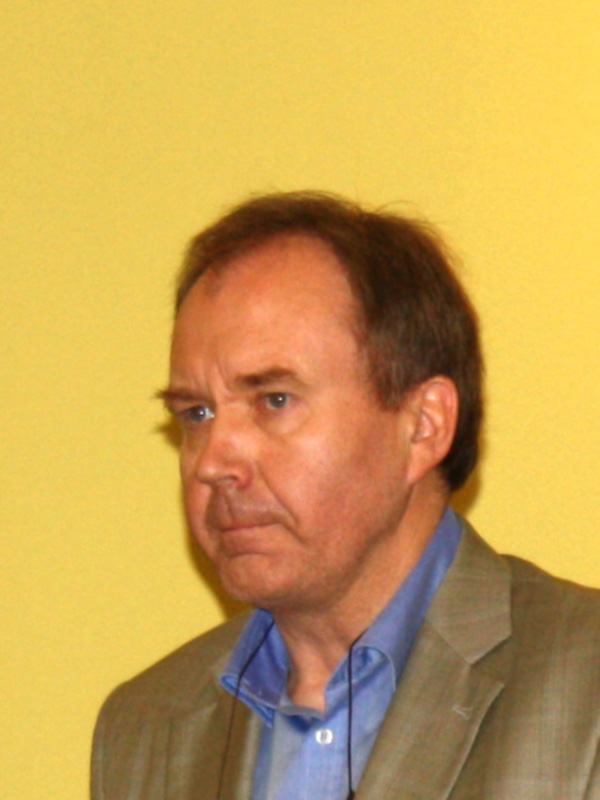
Toomas Tõnise

Toomas Tõnise (born 24 October 1952 in Tallinn) is an Estonian modern pentathlete and sports professional.

In 1976 he graduated from Tallinn Pedagogical Institute.

In the 1970s he become several times Estonian champion in modern pentathlon. From 1971-1979 he was a member of the Estonian national team.

In 1990 he was the principal of Estonian Sport Gymnasium. From 1990-2000 he was the executive secretary of Estonian Sport Central Union (Estonian: Eesti Spordi Keskliit). Since 1991 he has been a member of Estonian Olympic Committee. From 2000-2012 he was executive secretary of Estonian Olympic Committee.

Awards:

- 2004: Order of the White Star, V class.
