= Estonian Air Sports Federation =

Sports governing body in Estonia

Estonian Air Sports Federation (abbreviation EASF; Estonian: Eesti Lennuspordi Föderatsioon) is one of the sport governing bodies in Estonia which deals with air sports.

EASF is a member of World Air Sports Federation (FAI) and a member of Estonian Olympic Committee.
