= Estonian Golf Association =

Sports governing body in Estonia

Estonian Golf Association (abbreviation EGA; Estonian: Eesti Golfi Liit) is one of the sport governing bodies in Estonia which deals with golf.

EGA is established on 15 October 1992. EGA is a member of International Golf Federation (IGF) and Estonian Olympic Committee.
