= Atko-Meeme Viru =

Estonian basketballer

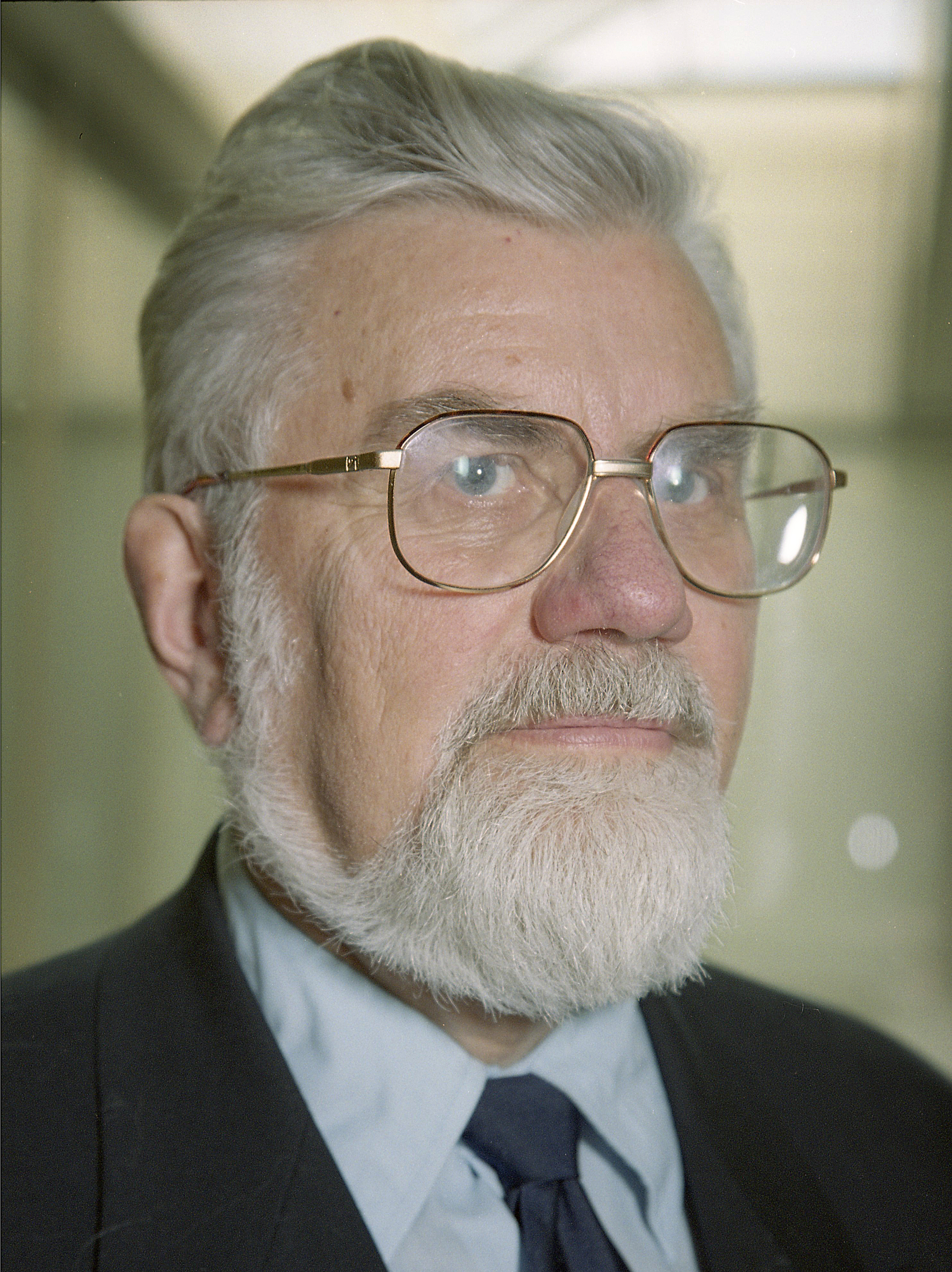
Atko-Meeme Viru in 1999

Atko-Meeme Viru (7 September 1932 Tallinn – 21 October 2007 Tartu) was an Estonian basketballer, sport personnel, sport scientist biologist and educator.

== Early life and education ==
Viru was born in Tallinn on 7 September 1932. In 1955 he graduated from Tartu State University in physical education.

== Basketball career ==
Viru played for the Estonian national basketball team from 1950, and won the Estonian championship in 1952, 1956 and 1958.

== Academic career ==
Viru joined the staff of the University of Tartu in 1959 and was appointed professor in 1974. He served as dean of the Faculty of Physical Culture from 1973 to 1989 and supervised four doctoral, thirty-six candidate and seven master's theses.

In 1989, he became a founding member of the restored Estonian Olympic Committee, serving on its board until 2003. That same year, he was elected the first president of the Estonian Olympic Academy, a position he held until 2001.

== Scientific work ==
Viru's research focused on the endocrine response to physical exercise and on the cellular and hormonal mechanisms of adaptation in sports training. He authored or co-authored more than 500 scientific articles, of which around 150 appeared in international peer-reviewed journals, and 13 monographs. Subsequent surveys of the field credit him as one of its founding figures, whose work from the late 1960s onward systematised the study of hormonal responses to acute and chronic exercise. In a 1992 synthesis he proposed a threshold exercise intensity for triggering endocrine responses. His son Mehis Viru, who heads the Laboratory of Sports Physiology at the University of Tartu, co-authored his last monograph.

== Death and legacy ==
Viru died in Tartu on 21 October 2007. An obituary in Postimees described him as Estonia's best-known sports scientist. Since 2009 the University of Tartu Foundation, together with the Estonian Olympic Academy, has awarded the Prof. Atko-Meeme Viru Scholarship to young researchers in movement and sports sciences.

== Selected works ==
- Viru, A. A. (1985). Hormones in Muscular Activity, Volume I: Hormonal Ensemble in Exercise. Boca Raton, FL: CRC Press. ISBN 978-0-8493-5493-9.
- Viru, Atko (1995). Adaptation in Sports Training. Boca Raton, FL: CRC Press. ISBN 978-0-8493-0171-1.
- Viru, Atko; Viru, Mehis (2001). Biochemical Monitoring of Sport Training. Champaign, IL: Human Kinetics. ISBN 978-0-7360-0348-3.

== Honours ==
- 2001: Order of the Estonian Red Cross, V class
- 2007: Honorary Citizen of Tartu
