= Estonian Karate Federation =

Sports governing body in Estonia

Estonian Karate Federation (abbreviation EKF; Estonian: Eesti Karate Föderatsioon) is one of the sport governing bodies in Estonia which deals with karate.

EKF is a legal successor of Estonian SSR Judo and Karate Federation which was established in 1974.

== See also ==
- Estonian Judo Federation
