= Estonian Disc Golf Association =

Sports governing body in Estonia

Estonian Disc Golf Association (abbreviation EDGA; Estonian: Eesti Discgolfi Liit) is one of the sport governing bodies in Estonia which deals with disc golf.

EDGA is established in 2014. EDGA is a member of Estonian Olympic Committee.
