= Estonian Billiard Association =

Sports governing body in Estonia

Estonian Billiard Association (abbreviation EBA; Estonian: Eesti Piljardi Liit) is one of the sport governing bodies in Estonia which deals with billiard (cue sports).

EBA is established on 12 April 1997. Before 2019, there existed three organizations: Estonian Billiard Federation, Estonian Snooker Federation, and Estonian Pyramid Federation. EBA is a member of World Snooker Federation (WSF) and International Pyramid Confederation (IPC).
