= Estonian Powerboating Union =

Sports governing body in Estonia

Estonian Powerboating Union (abbreviation EPU; Estonian: Eesti Veemoto Liit) is one of the sport governing bodies in Estonia which deals with powerboating.

EPU is the legal successor of Estonian SSR Water Motorsport Federation (Estonian: Eesti NSV Veemotospordi Föderatsioon) which was established on 15 May 1956. EPU is a member of Union Internationale Motonautique (UIM) and Estonian Olympic Committee.
