= Estonian Squash Federation =

Sports governing body in Estonia

Estonian Squash Federation (abbreviation ESF; Estonian: Eesti Squashiföderatsioon) is one of the sport governing bodies in Estonia which deals with squash.

ESF is a member of World Squash Federation (WSF).
