= European Polytechnical University =

University in Bulgaria

Coordinates: 42.6108°N 23.0403°E

- Европейски политехнически университет
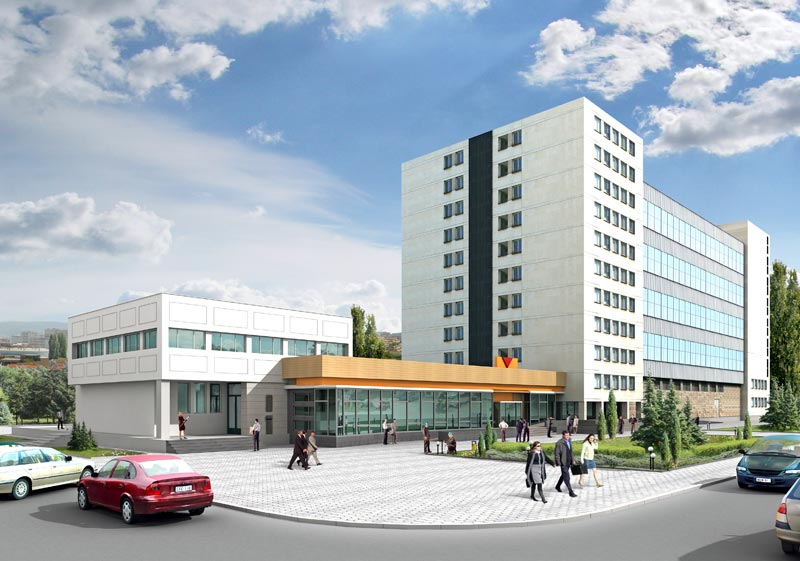
- Type: private
- Established: 2010
- President: Maria Slavova
- Vice-president: Nikolay Kolev
- Rector: Marin Marinov
- Location: Pernik, Bulgaria
- Language: Bulgarian, English
- Website: epubg.eu

The European Polytechnical University (Bulgarian: Европейски политехнически университет), or EPU, is a private engineering university, located in Pernik, Bulgaria. The university was founded in 2010.

As a member of the Multiversity Association of Universities, EPU benefits from numerous advantages, such as access to comprehensive digital library collections. At the same time, direct access for students to the study platform and content is made possible via the Multiversity Network. The Multiversity network originates from the renowned and largest university for distance learning in Italy, the Pegaso Telematica University.

== History ==
The founders of the university are "Investec" Ltd, "Bulgarian Properties" OOD and the municipality of Pernik. It was opened by a decision of the National Assembly of the Republic of Bulgaria on 10 June 2010.

The first rector of the EPU is Prof. Dr. Sc.(Econ.) dtt. Hristo Hristov (former Dean and Vice-Rector of TUS and Deputy Minister). The following rectors of the university were Assacs Prof. Dr. Borislav Borisov (from D. A. Tsenov Academy of Economics, former Deputy Mayor of Varna) in December 2011, Prof. Dr.Sc.(Econ.) in September 2012 and Ivan Petkov (former Dean and Vice Rector of the University of Sofia) in December 2015. Since 2016, Prof. Dr. Marin Marinov (Associate Professor at TUS) has been elected Rector of EPU.

The first president (chairman of the board of trustees) is Dr Toshko Krastev. Later the position was filled by the Italian professor. Giuseppe Saccone (since 2016) and Dr Riccardo Romeo (currently).

In 2015, EPU became part of the higher education community of the Italian Pegaso Consortium and received accreditation by the German Institute for Accreditation, Certification and Quality Assurance (ACQUIN) - a member of the European Association for Quality Assurance in Higher Education (ENQA).

== Programmes ==
The university's academic profile for bachelor's and master's degrees lies in the modern subject areas of computer science and computer engineering, communication and computer networks and systems, architecture and urban planning, civil engineering and innovative entrepreneurship. The same curricula are taught in Bulgarian and English in all subjects and degrees. These are:

- Bachelor programmes
  - Civil Engineering
  - Applied Computer Science
  - Green Energetics
- Master programmes
  - Earthquake Engineering
  - Renovation of Buildings, Facilities and Cultural Monuments
  - Biofuels
  - Hydrogen Technologies
  - Solar Energetics
  - Wind Energetics
  - Personal Data Security
  - Information Technology Management
  - Information Security

The EPU is currently accredited for 4 years until 10 June 2024. The accreditation is granted by the National Agency for Assessment and Accreditation (NEAA) of the Council of Ministers of the Republic of Bulgaria. The NEAA is listed in the European Quality Assurance Register for Higher Education (EQAR) which is the official register for these agencies.

== Internationality ==
The university has a strong focus on internationalisation. The EPU carries out educational activities within the framework of joint programmes with other European universities, through projects or academic exchanges. Leading companies, firms and professional associations participate in the university's work and provide opportunities for successful implementation. EPU cooperates with universities from Europe, the US and Asia. These include, among others:

- Germany
  - RWTH Aachen
  - SRH Hochschule Berlin
- Italy
  - University of Catania
  - Telematic University Pegaso
- Ireland
  - Ulster University
- Serbia
  - University of Niš

The internationalisation strategy also includes the increasing number of academic staff from other European countries and the possibility to complete a programme online. It is expected that the programmes will be widely accepted by European students or by people who need to study part-time for further education while working. Compared to other European private universities, tuition fees are low, at 500 to 1,000 euros per semester, depending on the programme. As a multinational and multicultural educational centre, the university adheres to European values and ethical standards: a harmonious space of tolerance, empathy, respect and mutual understanding between students of different ethnicities, religions and cultures.
