= Joakim Puhk =

Estonian businessman and politician

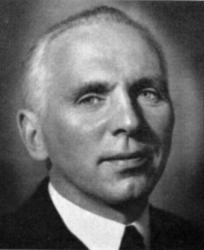
- Born: 25 May 1888
- Died: 14 September 1942 (aged 54)
- Cause of death: Executed by the NKVD
- Occupation: Businessman
- Known for: Member of the International Olympic Committee

Joakim Puhk (25 May 1888 – 14 September 1942) was an Estonian businessman, economist and Rotarian; a member of the International Chamber of Commerce, and a member of the International Olympic Committee from 1936 to 1942.

== Biography ==
Joakim Puhk was born in Viljandi to Jaak Johann Puhk and Anna Luise Puhk as their third child and first son out of five yet to be born. Anna-Luise, his mother, was born at Imavere Manor in Viljandimaa as a daughter of gardener. His father, also from Viljandimaa was a member of a family with 18 children. Puhk attended to the Riga Commercial School from where he graduated in 1904. Being a leftist his participation in the 1905 Russian Revolution resulted 3 years of imprisonment for the revolutionary activities. Because Joakim Puhk was still a minor, his sentence was reduced to 2 years. After released from prison Puhk returned to his homeland Estonia where he engaged with his father's company established in 1881 and renamed in 1913: Jaak Puhk and Sons Department Store. (Estonian: Jaak Puhk ja Pojad). On 27 July 1917, Joakim Puhk's father died and he, 29 years old at the time together with his younger brothers Eduard, Voldemar, Aleksander and Evald continued to run the business.

Besides been involved with the family business Puhk became the director of a factory Ilmarine, and member of the board of an insurance company Estonian Lloyd Ltd. After the February Revolution Russia granted autonomy to Estonia, Puhk hold the chairman of the Food Office of the Autonomous Governorate of Estonia in 1917–1918. During the German Occupation of Estonia in World War I, during 1918–1919, Puhk was nominated to an assistant of the Minister for Food.

After the end of German Occupation and beginning of Estonian war of independence Puhk became an economic expert consulting the Estonian government, participating at the Paris Peace Conference, 1919, and in 1920 at the signing of the Tartu Peace Treaty. Puhk was an elected member of the Estonian Constituent Assembly that adopted the first Constitution of Republic of Estonia on 15 June 1920.

On 10 November 1925 Joakim Puhk was elected the chairman of the Board of the Estonian Chamber of Commerce and Economy and in 1925 became a member the International Chamber of Commerce' World Council. He served as Honorary Consul for Lithuania (1921–1927) and Finland (1927–1940).

In 1921 Puhk married Anna Sinisoff and they had two daughters: Eva-Agne was born on 15 August 1927 and Anna Mirjam on 19 March 1933.

Joakim Puhk, one of the richest person in Estonia in the 1930s was an active sponsor of sports that resulted nomination for candidacy of membership for the International Olympic Committee. The submission for candidacy was supported by the Finnish and Swedish Olympic Committees and Puhk became a member in July 1936.

After the Soviet Occupation of Estonia Joakim Puhk was arrested on 31 August 1940 and executed by the NKVD on 14 September 1942.
