= Estonian Triathlon Association =

Sports governing body in Estonia

Estonian Triathlon Association (abbreviation ETA; Estonian: Eesti Triatloni Liit) is one of the sport governing bodies in Estonia which deals with triathlon.

ETA is established in 1988. ETA is a member of World Triathlon.
