= Tallinn International Horse Show =

Equestrian sports competition in Tallinn

Tallinn International Horse Show is an international equestrian sports competition which annually takes place in Saku Suurhall, Tallinn, Estonia. The first competition took place on 18th–20th October, 2002.

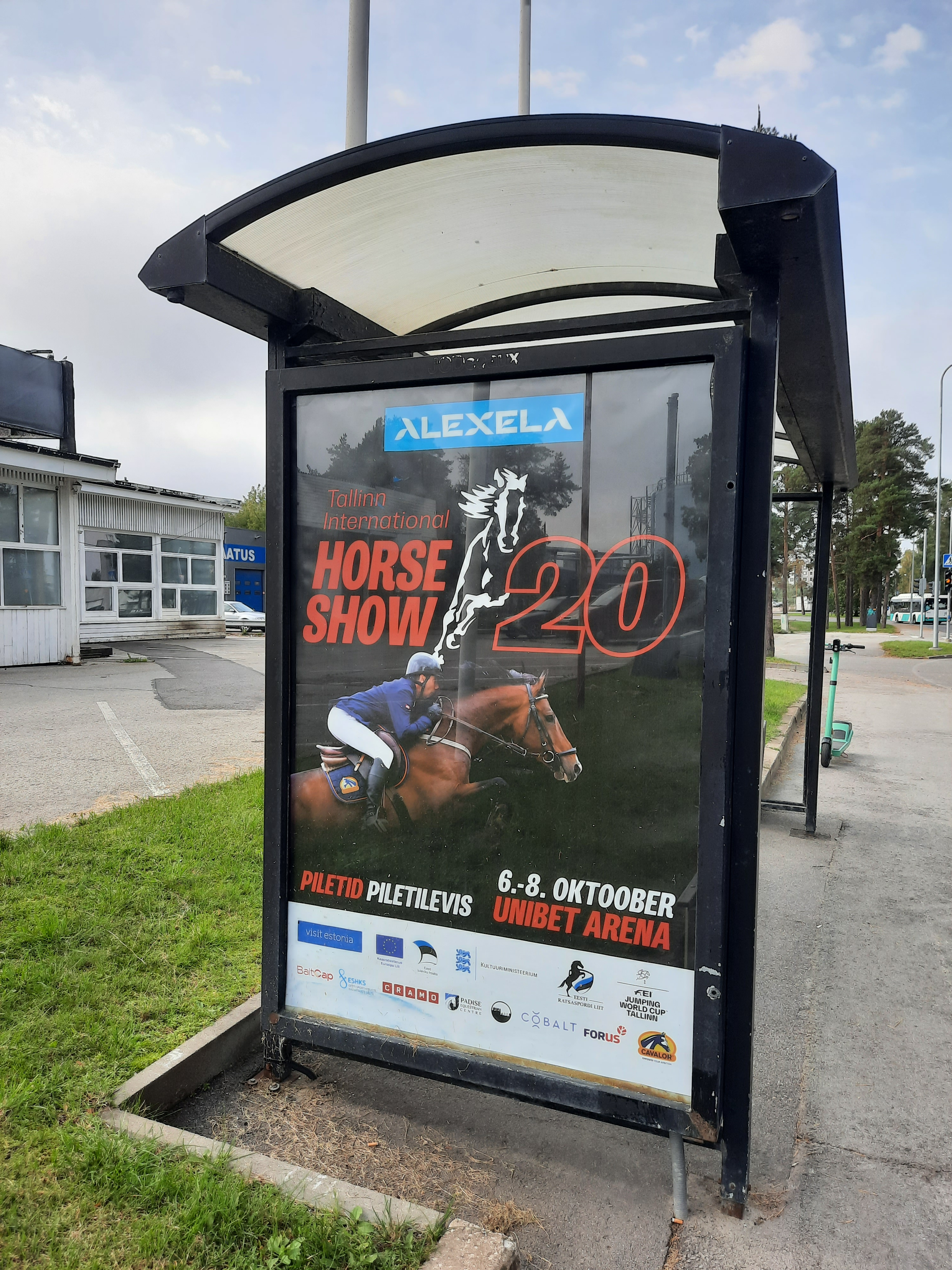
Bus shelter advertisement for the Tallinn International Horse Show, 2023

== Winners ==
The winners of Horse Show Grand Prix and FEI World Cup:

- 2002 Rein Pill and Ecuador (EST)
- 2003 Matthias Granzow and Cabrol Amicor (GER)
- 2004 Camilla Enemark and Diamant du Gaty (DEN)
- 2005 Gunnar Klettenberg – Novesta (EST)
- 2006 Łukasz Jończyk – Lavida (POL)
- 2007 Raimo Aaltonen – Lumonia (FIN)
- 2008 Hanno Ellermann – Poncorde (EST)
- 2010 Peter Geerink – Scotch (NED)
- 2011 Anna Gromzina – Pimlico (RUS)
- 2012 Gunnar Klettenberg – Ulrike R (EST)
- 2013 Vladimir Beletskiy – Mats’ Up Du Plessis (RUS)
- 2014 Tiit Kivisild – Cinnamon (EST)
- 2015 Alexandr Belekhov – Bivaldi (RUS)
- 2016 Andis Varna – Coradina KS (LAT)
- 2017 Michal Kazmierczak – Stakorado (POL)
- 2018 Kristaps Neretnieks – Moon Ray (LAT)
- 2019 Laura Penele – Dundas V.D.M. (LAT)
- 2021 Abdullah Alsharbatly – Quincy 230 (KSA)
- 2022 Janna Jensen – Hamont (FIN)
- 2023 Madis Morna – Herbert (EST)
- 2024 Kristaps Neretnieks – Quintes (LAT)
- 2025 Jüri Sokolovski - Edith (EST)
