= Neinar Seli =

Estonian athlete, entrepreneur, and politician

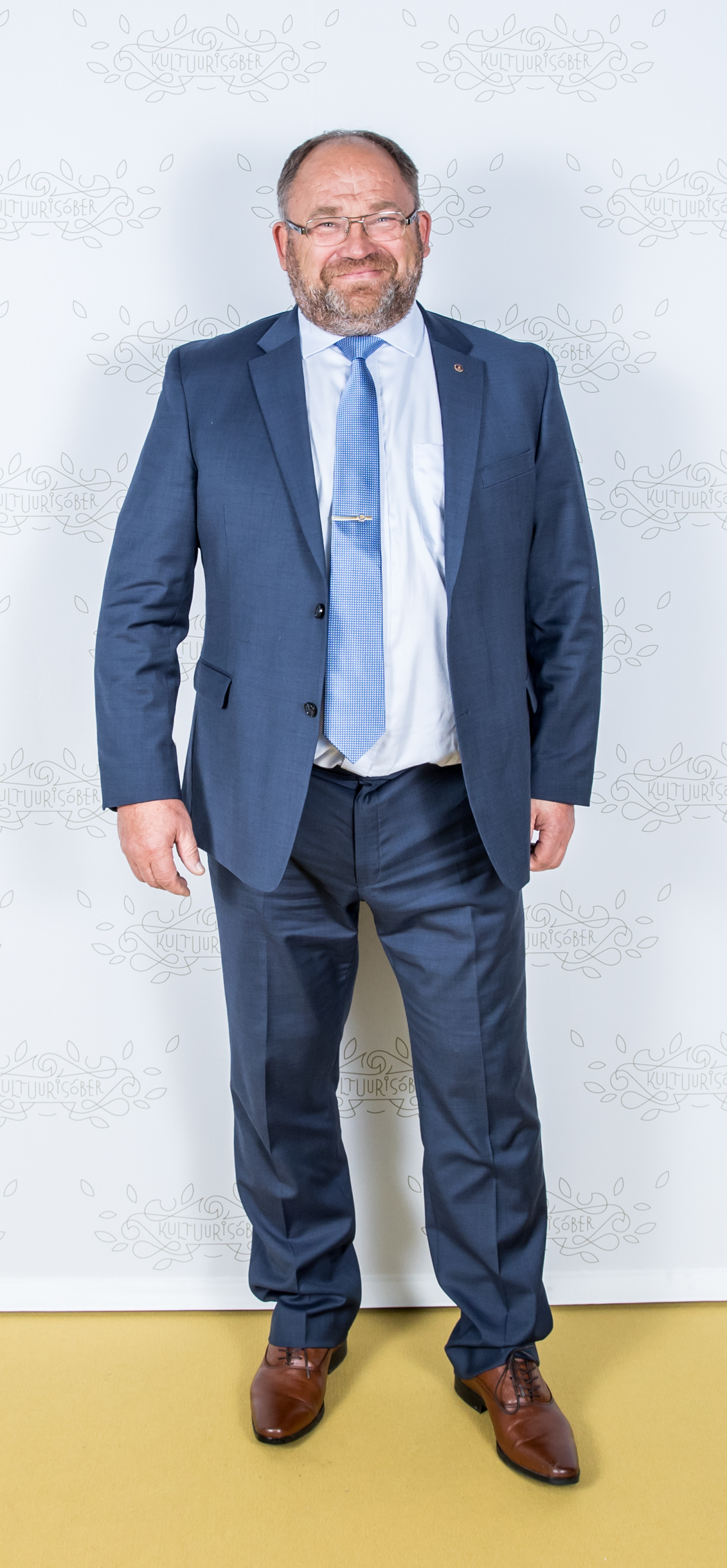
Neinar Seli in 2019

Neinar Seli (born 7 December 1959 in Tartu) is an Estonian sports figure (hammer throw), entrepreneur and politician.

He was a member of IX Riigikogu.

From 2012 to 2016 he was the president of Estonian Olympic Committee.

In 2006 he was awarded with Order of the White Star, III class.
