= Estonian Shooting Sport Federation =

Sports governing body in Estonia

Estonian Shooting Sport Federation (abbreviation ESSF; Estonian: Eesti Laskurliit) is one of the sport governing bodies in Estonia which deals with Estonian shooting sport. Besides this federation, also Estonian Practical Shooting Association is operating in Estonia.

ESSF is established on 24 March 1931.

ESSF is a member of International Shooting Sport Federation (ISSF).
