= Estonian Bowling Association =

Sports governing body in Estonia

Estonian Bowling Association (abbreviation EBA; Estonian: Eesti Veeremängude Liit) is one of the sport governing bodies in Estonia which deals with bowling (tenpin bowling and ninepin bowling).

EBA is established on 28 November 1991. EBA is a member of International Bowling Federation (IBF).
