= Estonian Ski Association =

Sports governing body in Estonia

Estonian Ski Association (abbreviation ESA; Estonian: Eesti Suusaliit) is one of the sport governing bodies in Estonia which deals with skiing (including alpine, cross-country, Nordic combined, freestyle and jumping, snowboarding). Independent sport governing body is Estonian Biathlon Union.

ESA is a successor of Estonian Winter Sport Association (Estonian: Eesti Talvespordi Liit) which was established on 28 November 1921.
