= Estonian Table Tennis Association =

Sports governing body in Estonia

Estonian Table Tennis Association (abbreviation ETTA; Estonian: Eesti Lauatenniseliit) is one of the sport governing bodies in Estonia which deals with table tennis.

ETTA was established on 24 November 1990 in Tallinn. ETTA is a member of International Table Tennis Federation (ITTF).
