= Estonian Modern Pentathlon Association =

Sports governing body in Estonia

Estonian Modern Pentathlon Association (abbreviation EMPA; Estonian: Eesti Moodsa Viievõistluse Liit) is one of the sport governing bodies in Estonia which deals with modern pentathlon.

EMPA is established on 20 April 1990 in Tallinn. EMPA is a member of International Modern Pentathlon Union (UIPM).
