= Estonian Wrestling Federation =

Sports governing body in Estonia

Estonian Wrestling Federation (abbreviation EWF; Estonian: Eesti Maadlusliit) is one of the sport governing bodies in Estonia which deals with wrestling.

The history of EWF goes back to 1920 when the organization (Estonian: Eesti Kerge-, Raske- ja Veespordiliit) was established. In 1933 the organization (Estonian: Eesti Maadlus-, Poksi- ja Tõsteliit) was established. During the Estonian SSR period, the Estonian SSR Wrestling Federation (Estonian: Eesti NSV Maadlusföderatsioo) existed.

EWF is a member of United World Wrestling (UWW).
