= Estonian Practical Shooting Association =

Sports governing body in Estonia

- Eesti Practical-laskmise Ühing
- Parent organization: International Practical Shooting Confederation
- Website: www.ipsc.ee

The Estonian Practical Shooting Association, Estonian Eesti Practical-laskmise Ühing, is the Estonian association for practical shooting under the International Practical Shooting Confederation.
