= Estonian Sports Association Jõud =

Organization based in Estonia

Estonian Sports Association Jõud (Estonian: Eestimaa Spordiliit Jõud) is an Estonian sports association.

Since 2011 the president of Jõud is Helir-Valdor Seeder.

== History ==
Names:

- 1946–1951 Eesti NSV Vabatahtlik Spordiühing Jõud
- 1951–1956 Eesti NSV Vabatahtlik Spordiühing Kolhoosnik
- 1957–1987 Eesti NSV Vabatahtlik Spordiühing Jõud
- 1990–2007 Eesti Maaspordi Liit Jõud

Notable sportsmen:

- Jaan Talts, Estonian weightlifter, olympic winner
- Jaak Uudmäe, Estonian triple jumper, olympic winner
- Enn Sellik, Estonian runner
- Toomas Napa, Estonian racing driver
