= 2009 FEI World Cup Jumping final =

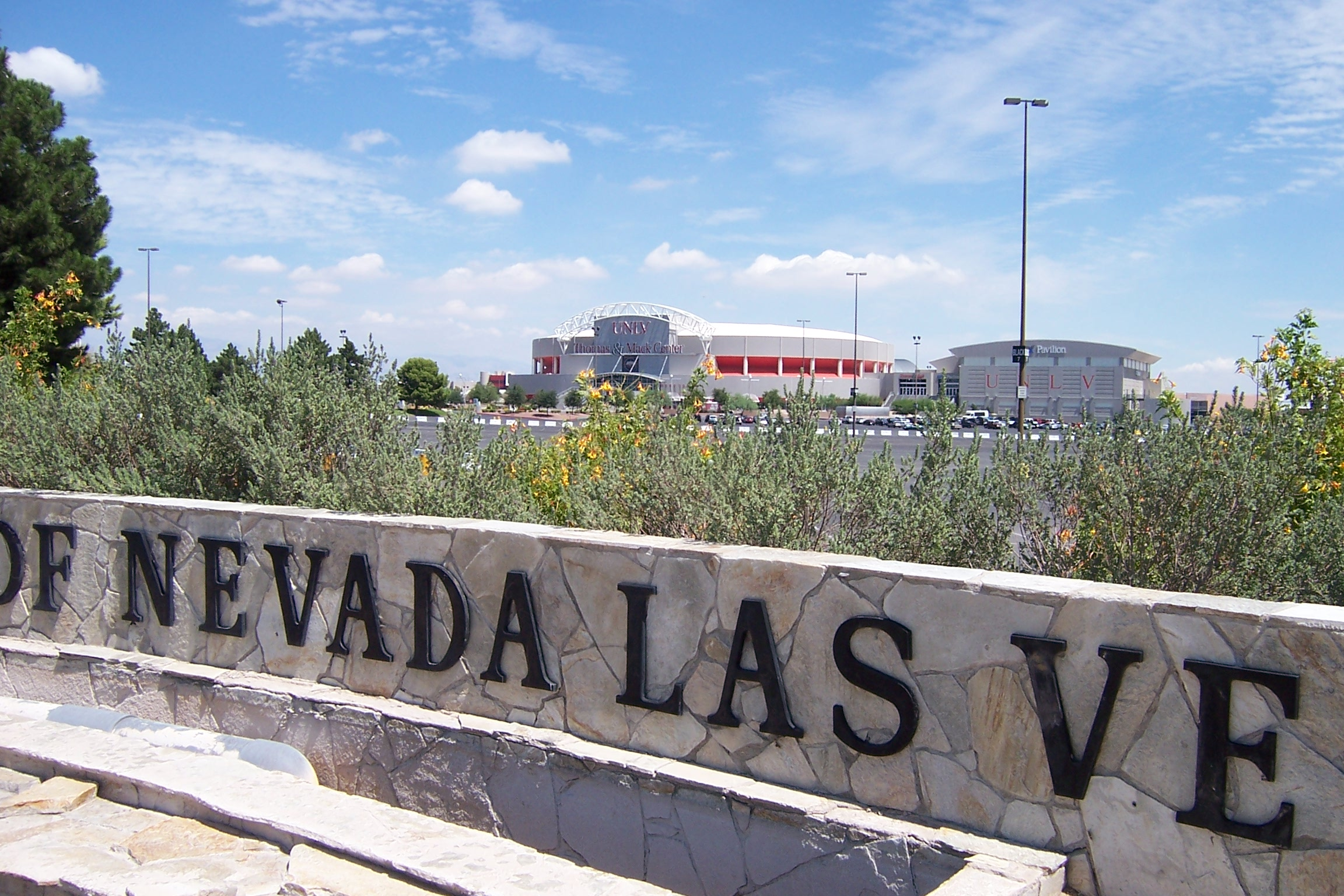
The Thomas & Mack Center

The 2009 FEI World Cup Jumping Final was the 31st final of the FEI World Cup Jumping show jumping series. It was held at the Thomas & Mack Center in Las Vegas, Nevada, United States from April 15 to April 19, 2009, for the fifth time following 2000, 2003, 2005, and 2007. Meredith Michaels-Beerbaum of Germany was the defending champion, having won the 2008 final in Gothenburg, Sweden.

Forty six riders from twenty two countries competed in the event. Michaels-Beerbaum successfully defended her title, winning the event on 16-year-old Hanoverian gelding Shutterfly.
