= Estonian Weightlifting Federation =

Sports governing body in Estonia

Estonian Weightlifting Federation (abbreviation EWF; Estonian: Eesti Tõstespordi Liit) is one of the sport governing bodies in Estonia which deals with weightlifting.

EWF history dates back to 1920 when Estonian Sport Union (Estonian: Eesti Spordiliit) was established; the union also had a weightlifting department. In 1926, EKRAVE Union (Estonian: Eesti Kerge-, Raske- ja Veespordi Liit) was established. EWF considers its actual establishment on 10 April 1933, when Estonian Wrestling-, Boxing- and Weightlifting Union (Estonian: Maadluse-, Poksi- ja Tõsteliit) was created. In 1989, EWF is re-established.

EWF is a member of International Weightlifting Federation (IWF).
