= Estonian Tennis Association =

Sports governing body in Estonia

Estonian Tennis Association (abbreviation ETA; Estonian: Eesti Tennise Liit) is one of the sport governing bodies in Estonia which deals with tennis.

ETA was established in 1922 and re-established in 1991. ETA is a member of International Tennis Federation (ITF).

The president of ETA is Enn Pant.
