= Darragh Kenny =

Irish equestrian

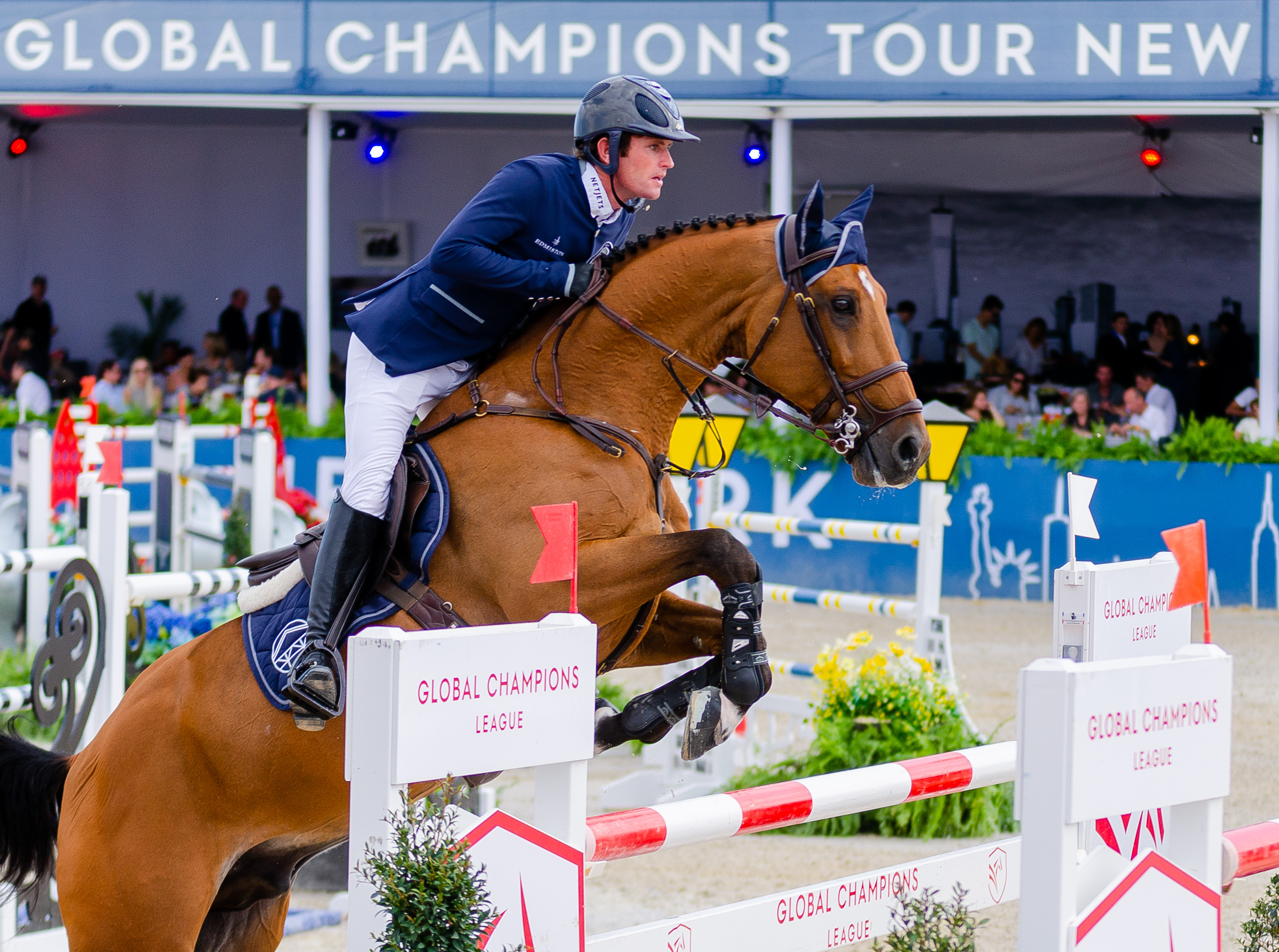
- Darragh Kenny competing at the LGCT of New York

Personal information
- Nationality: Ireland
- Discipline: Show jumping
- Born: 24 January 1988 (age 38); Belmont, County Offaly, Ireland

Darragh Kenny (born 24 January 1988) is an Irish equestrian who competes in the sport of show jumping.

He competed in his first Grand Prix at the age of 14. He qualified for the Dublin Horse Show in 2007, where he won a training bursary to work with Missy Clark and John Brennan at their North Run Stables in Warren, Vermont which brought him to America to compete at the Winter Equestrian Festival in Wellington, Florida. Under Clark's guidance, Kenny was given the rides on Obelix and Gael Force, horses that he qualified for his first FEI World Cup Finals on and continued to campaign at the highest level including representing Ireland in Nations Cup events. In 2015, the Ireland team with Kenny won the Aga Khan Trophy at the Dublin Horse Show.

In 2012, Kenny founded Oakland Ventures LLC, a business covering his riding and training of clients. In 2025, Oakland Ventures had presence in Wellington Florida and at the Ox Ridge Hunt Club in Darien Connecticut. Kenny was partnered with Hyperion Stud through 2019.

In 2021, Kenny made his Olympic debut at the 2020 Tokyo Summer Olympic Games. He and his mount, VDL Cartello placed seventeenth in the individual competition.

On 24 July 2024, Kenny and VDL Cartello replaced Bertram Allen as Ireland's travelling reserve rider at the 2024 Paris Olympic games.

== Major results ==
Recent Major Results for Darragh Kenny
Year	Place	Horse	Class	Rating	Show	Location
2020	1	Classic Dream	$213,300 Longines World Cup Qualifier Grand Prix	CSI4*-W	Palm Beach Masters	Wellington, FL (USA)
2019	1	Classic Dream	Longines Christmas Cracker 1.55m	CSI5*	London Olympia	London (UK)
2019	1	Important de Muze	Santa Stakes 1.55m	CSI5*	London Olympia	London (UK)
2019	2	Romeo 88	Rolex IJRC Top 10 Final	CSI5*	CHI Geneva	Geneva (CH)
2019	1	Sweet Tricia	€55,600 Queen's Cup	CSIO5*-NC	Nations Cup Final	Barcelona (ESP)
2019	1	Balou du Reventon	Longines FEI Jumping Nations Cup Final	CSIO5*	Nations Cup Final	Barcelona (ESP)
2019	1	Balou du Reventon	€300,000 LGCT Grand Prix of Chantilly	CSI5*	LGCT Chantilly	Chantilly (FRA)
2019	1	Balou du Reventon	€500,000 Rolex Grand Prix	CSI5*	Knokke Hippique	Knokke-Heist (BEL)
2018	1	Cassini Z	Santa Stakes 1.55m	CSI5*	London Olympia	London (UK)
2018	1	Balou du Reventon	Longine FEI Jumping Nations Cup Final	CSIO5*-NC	Nations Cup Final	Barcelona (ESP)
2018	1	Balou du Reventon	Sport Ireland Classic	CSIO5*-NC	Dublin Horse Show	Dublin (IRL)
2017	1	Chanel	Dura Vermeer Prijs 1.55m	CSIO5*	Rotterdam	Rotterdam (NLD)
