= Estonian Biathlon Union =

Sports governing body in Estonia

Estonian Biathlon Union (abbreviation EBU; Estonian: Eesti Laskesuusatamise Föderatsioon) is one of the sport governing bodies in Estonia which deals with biathlon.

EBU was established on 11 November 1992. EBU is a member of International Biathlon Union.
