= Estonian Judo Association =

Sports governing body in Estonia

- Sport: Judo
- Jurisdiction: Estonia
- Abbreviation: EJL
- Founded: 15 November 1998
- Affiliation: IJF
- Regional affiliation: EJU

Official website
- judo.ee
- (Estonia)

Estonian Judo Association (abbreviation EJL; Estonian: Eesti Judoliit) is one of the sport governing bodies in Estonia which deals with judo.

== History ==
EJL is established on 15 November 1998. EJL is a member of the European Judo Union and the International Judo Federation (IJF).

== See also ==
- List of judo organizations
- Judo by country
