= Tiit Nuudi =

Estonian politician and tennis player

Tiit Nuudi (born 22 October 1949 in Tallinn) is an Estonian politician and former tennis player.

1988–1990, he was Minister of the Environment.
