= Estonian Equestrian Federation =

Sports governing body in Estonia

Estonian Equestrian Federation (abbreviation EEF; Estonian: Eesti Ratsaspordi Liit) is one of the sport governing bodies in Estonia which deals with equestrian sport.

EEF was established in 1922. On 12 December 1990, EEF is re-established. EEF is a member of International Federation for Equestrian Sports (FEI).
