= The British Horse Society Equestrian Hall of Fame =

The British Horse Society Equestrian Hall of Fame was launched in 2005 to pay homage to the people and horses who have made outstanding contributions to the sport of Equestrianism in Great Britain. Elections to the Hall of Fame are made by a Panel of laureates and the British Horse Society Chairman. The panel meets annually to consider suggestions put forward from within the panel, BHS Members, and by the general public. On 20 February 2008 a wall of plaques at the Household Cavalry’s barracks in Knightsbridge, London were revealed in a ceremony by Anne, Princess Royal.

== Laureates ==
Historic Horsemen and horses announced on 29 July 2005 at the Royal International Horse Show, Hickstead.

- Dorian Williams
- Pat Smythe
- Sheila Willcox
- Ginny Leng
- Col Harry Llewellyn
- Richard Meade
- Col Sir Michael Ansell
- Anna Sewell
- David Broome
- Harvey Smith
- HRH The Princess Royal
- Cynthia Haydon
- George Bowman
- Mrs VDS Williams
- Lorna Johnstone
- Priceless
- King's Warrior
- Dutch Courage
- Cornishman
- Doublet
- Sefton
- Foxhunter
- Milton
- Penwood Forge Mill
- Stroller
- Be Fair
- High & Mighty

Laureates announced on 22 November 2005

- Pippa Funnell
- Lucinda Green
- Lee Pearson
- Primmore's Pride
- Arko lll
- John Whitaker
- Carl Hester
- Shear H2O

Laureates announced on 7 June 2006

- Jennie Loriston-Clarke
- Robert Oliver
- Captain Mark Phillips
- Bertie Hill
- Caroline Bradley
- Tosca
- Beethoven
- Marion Mould
- Nick Skelton
- Douglas Bunn

Laureates announced on 9 January 2007

- Ted Edgar
- Liz Edgar
- HRH The Duke of Edinburgh
- Mary King
- Wilf White
- Colton Maelstrom
- Ryan's Son

Laureates announced 20 February 2008

- Mary Gordon-Watson
- William Fox-Pitt
- Nizefella
- Everest Forever
- The Poacher

Laureates announced 17 November 2008

- Ann Moore
- Ian Stark
- Michael Whitaker
- Mr Softee
- Over to You

Laureates inducted October 2010

- Anneli Drummond-Hay
- Malcolm Pyrah
- Count Robert Orssich
- Merely-A-Monarch

Laureates inducted November 2011

- Laura Bechtolsheimer

Laureates inducted December 2012

- Sophie Christiansen
- Charlotte Dujardin
- Ben Maher
- Vin Toulson
- Mistral Hojris
- Pretty Polly

Laureates inducted November 2013

- Kristina Cook
- Toytown

Laureates inducted November 2014

- William Funnell
- Jane Holderness-Roddam
- Valegro
- Big Star

Laureates inducted November 2015

- Scott Brash
- Jayne Ross
- Hello Sanctos
- Headley Britannia

Laureates inducted November 2016

- Christopher Bartle
- Avebury
- Chilli Morning
- Opposition Buzz
- Philco

Laureates inducted November 2018

- Natasha Baker MBE

== See also ==
- List of historical horses
