= Boomerang (horse) =

Irish-bred showjumping horse (1966–1983)

- Breed: Irish Sport Horse
- Sire: Battleburn (Thoroughbred)
- Grandsire: Shapoor (Thoroughbred)
- Dam: Girl From The Brown Mountain (Irish Draught)
- Sex: Gelding
- Foaled: 1966; Ninemilehouse, County Tipperary, Ireland
- Died: May 1983 (aged 16–17); Kells, County Meath, Ireland
- Country: Ireland
- Colour: Bay, star near the hind sock
- Breeder: Jimmy Murphy
- Owner: Eddie Macken
- Last updated on: 18 December 2023.

Boomerang
Medal record

Equestrian

World Championships
Silver medal – second place	1978 Aachen	Individual jumping

European Championships
Bronze medal – third place	1979 Rotterdam	Team jumping

Boomerang, later Carroll's Boomerang (1966 – May 1983), was an Irish-bred showjumping horse of the 1970s. He won the Hickstead Derby four years in a row, a record, and was one of the greatest of that or any decade. Boomerang also held the record for prize-money. Standing 16.2 hh (168 cm), Boomerang was ridden in show jumping most successfully by Eddie Macken, as well as by Liz Edgar (Broome), Johan Heins and Paul Schockemöhle.

== Career ==
=== Early years ===
The horse was bred by Jimmy Murphy of Maifield. He and his wife Mai, who owned racehorses, sent their Irish Draught mare, Girl From The Brown Mountain, to Battleburn. The Murphy family broke the horse, initially named Battle Boy, and identified its talent. Murphy hunted him with the Kilmoganny Harriers, jumped him in novice classes on the Tipperary/Kilkenny/Waterford gymkhana circuit and later sent him to "finishing school" with 1969 European showjumping champion Iris Kellett in Dublin. Eddie Macken, a working pupil at Kellett's, first rode the horse, which debuted at the RDS, Dublin Spring Show as a four-year-old in 1970. Two years later, Jimmy sold him to Ted and Liz Edgar's yard in Warwickshire, England. Liz Edgar successfully jumped him before he was sold to Schockemöhle, who renamed him Boomerang at his stables in Mühlen, Germany.

=== Reunited with Macken ===
Macken by this time had moved into the heartland of continental competition when he went to the Schockemöhle brothers Paul and Alwin in the spring of 1975. A rich German owner, Dr Herbert Schnapka, eased Macken's way by providing horses for him to ride in the Schockemöhle yard. Easter Parade, Macken's best horse at the time, broke his back in a freak accident on his way back from the cancelled spring meeting at Hickstead in 1975. By way of an interim replacement, Paul Schockemöhle said to Macken:

...take my speed horse Boomerang for the time being until you get something better.'

=== International success ===
Over the period 1975–1979, Macken and Boomerang were to win or take second in a record-breaking 32 major Grands Prix or Derby events across Europe and in the United States. Boomerang helped Macken top the world ratings in 1976, 1977 and 1978, while amassing £250,000 in prize money – record winnings at the time (£1.3M in 2023).

In 1977, Dr Schnapka gave the outright gift of Boomerang to Macken.

In 1978, Macken and Boomerang reached the final four of the world championship in Aachen before disaster struck. In the final round Macken was obliged to jump a round on each of his competitors’ horses and on one, Pandur Z, he made a miscalculation. The quarter of a time fault – “like Tiger Woods missing a three-foot putt” – cost him gold. “Boomerang deserved to be world champion”, Macken said. “Well, he was world champion because he was the best horse there. I wasn’t. I was the one who made the mistake”.

When Boomerang was at his peak, Macken was barred from competing at the Olympic Games because he was a professional and had sponsorship. The 1979 European Championships, in Rotterdam again proved a disappointment. Boomerang did not knock a single fence in the first three rounds and helped Con Power on Rockbarton, Gerry Mullins on Ballinderry and John Roche on Maigh Cullin to a bronze medal behind Britain and Germany. Boomerang was in the individual lead and heading for gold when a judge made a late decision that he had hit the tape at the water jump, and he and Macken finished in fourth place.

That autumn Boomerang and Macken won the main class at Calgary every day and took the du Maurier Classic Grand Prix in September. In October, the duo won their fourth Horse of the Year Grand Prix at Wembley. Lastly, at the second Dublin Indoor International in November, they won the main events on Thursday and Friday, followed by third place in the Grand Prix. With a double clear, they were fourth in the Grand Prix at Olympia just before Christmas, and that was to be Boomerang's last major individual outing with Macken.

Boomerang and Macken won four consecutive Hickstead Derbies from 1976 to 1979, and also the Hamburg equivalent in 1976. They, along with James Kernan on Condy, Paul Darragh on Heather Honey and Capt. Con Power on (Coolronan 1977, Castlepark 1978 and Rockbarton 1979), won the Aga Khan Trophy at the RDS Dublin (Ireland's Nations Cup) from 1977 to 1979.

=== Retirement ===
In early 1980, Boomerang had to be retired because of a broken pedal bone. The organisers of the Hickstead Derby brought the horse and Macken back for a farewell from the crowd.

Then in May 1983, at 17 years of age, he had to be euthanised and was buried at Rafeehan Stud, Kells, County Meath. His grave is marked by four evergreen trees. They are symbols of four Hickstead Derby wins, four Championships at Wembley, four clear rounds in the final of the 1978 World Championships and four years in a row without a fence down in the Aga Khan Trophy competition in Dublin.

== Major achievements ==
- 1979
  - Horse of the Year Grand Prix, Wembley, London
  - Championship, Wembley, London
  - Spruce Meadows Grand Prix, Calgary, Canada
  - Team bronze at the European Championships, Rotterdam, Netherlands
  - Individual 4th, European Championships, Rotterdam, Netherlands
  - Nations Cup (Aga Khan Trophy), Dublin, Ireland
  - Nations Cup, Aachen, Germany
  - Hickstead Derby, Hickstead, England
  - Hickstead Derby Trial, Hickstead, England
- 1978
  - Health Trophy, Dublin Indoor International
  - Horse of the Year Grand Prix, Wembley, London
  - Hickstead Derby, Hickstead, England
  - Individual silver medal, World Show Jumping Championships, Aachen, Germany
  - 2nd place, Dublin Grand Prix, Dublin, Ireland
  - Nations Cup (Aga Khan Trophy), Dublin, Ireland
  - Aachen Grand Prix, Aachen, Germany
  - Championship, Aachen, Germany
  - Rome Grand Prix, Rome, Italy
  - Championship, Rome, Italy
  - Hamburg Grand Prix, Hamburg, Germany
  - Nice Grand Prix, Nice, France
  - Gothenburg Grand Prix, Gothenburg, Sweden
- 1977
  - Brussels Grand Prix, Brussels, Belgium
  - Horse of the Year Grand Prix, Wembley, London
  - Nations Cup (Aga Khan Trophy), Dublin, Ireland
  - Hickstead Derby, Hickstead, England
  - La Baule Grand Prix, La Baule, France
  - 2nd place, Nations Cup, La Baule, France
  - 2nd place, Grand Prix, Rome, Italy
- 1976
  - Championship, Wembley, London
  - New York City Grand Prix, U.S.A
  - Helped Macken become Leading Rider in Washington.
  - Wins in Toronto gave Macken the overall award for the three shows on the North American circuit.
  - Hickstead Derby, Hickstead, England
  - Hamburg Derby, Hamburg, Germany - (8th 1975, 4th 1977, 6th 1978)
  - Professional Championship, Cardiff, Wales
  - 2nd place, Grand Prix, Lucerne, Switzerland
  - 2nd place, Nations Cup, Lucerne, Switzerland
- 1975
  - Horse of the Year Grand Prix, Wembley, London
  - Championship, Wembley, London
  - 4 faults, Hickstead Derby, Hickstead, England
  - Hickstead Derby Trial, Hickstead, England
  - 2nd place, Dublin Grand Prix, Dublin, Ireland
  - 2nd place, Nations Cup (Aga Khan Trophy), Dublin, Ireland
  - St. Gallen Grand Prix, St. Gallen, Switzerland
  - Wiesbaden Grand Prix, Wiesbaden, Germany
