= Ryan's Son =

Show jumper horse (1968-1987)

- Breed: Irish Draught x Thoroughbred
- Sire: Ozymandias
- Dam: Irish Draught
- Sex: Gelding
- Foaled: 1968
- Died: 1987; Hickstead, Haywards Heath, UK
- Country: United Kingdom
- Colour: Bay
- Rider: John Whitaker

Ryan's Son
Medal record

Equestrian

Olympic Games
Silver medal – second place	1984 Los Angeles	Team jumping

World Championships
Bronze medal – third place	1982 Dublin	Team show jumping

European Championships
Silver medal – second place	1983 Hickstead	Individual show jumping
Silver medal – second place	1983 Hickstead	Team show jumping

Ryan's Son (1968-1987) was a successful show jumping horse ridden by John Whitaker. He was a bay gelding and stood 16 hands (64 inches, 163 cm). He was sired by a Thoroughbred called Ozymandias and born from an Irish Draught mare. In January 2007, Ryan's Son joined John Whitaker in being inducted into The British Horse Society Equestrian Hall of Fame.

In 2020 he was named as one of the greatest horses of all time by Country Life with Ryan's Son being noted for "a distinctive white blaze, a swishing tail and a habit of bucking violently after the last fence that was beloved by the public." A crowd favourite, Ryan's Son became renowned for bucking after the final fence. On the bucking, rider John Whitaker was quoted as saying:

"He was showing off. He knew he had finished by the applause and by feeling me switch off the pressure. He said: 'that's it, I have done it', and bucked. It was off-putting, though, if the audience clapped after a difficult combination in the middle of a round, because he bucked then too, which would put you wrong for the next fence."

== Career ==
Malcolm Barr gave Ryan's Son to teenager, and future son in law, John Whitaker in 1973 after buying him for £2,500. He would end up earning more than a hundred times that—winning Olympic, World and European Championship medals, the British Jumping Derby at the All England Jumping Course at Hickstead and the King George V Gold Cup amongst others. Whitaker would comment that the horse catapulted him into success and without him Whitaker would have become a milkman. He also said "Ryan's Son got me to the top and changed our lives"

The horse and teenage John bonded immediately, becoming the team to beat at local shows around Huddersfield. This was despite the fact John had, at first sight, considered Ryan's Son to look like a cart horse with big feet, big head, too much white on him, a ewe neck and too small standing barely 16hh. Whitaker and Ryan's Son won at The Great Yorkshire Show when Whitaker was still 17, defeating more experienced riders such as David Broome and Harvey Smith. Ryan's Son would go on to become the biggest money-winner on the circuit for 10 years and Ryan's Son became the first British show jumping horse to win more than £200,000.

After winning silver in the 1980 European Championship, in 1982 Ryan's Son ridden by John Whitaker was part of the team that won silver at the World Show Jumping Championships prior to the competition becoming part of the combined WEG. He would go on to medal at the 1984 Olympics, and the 1983 World Championships. He won the Hickstead British Jumping Derby in 1983 and the King George V Cup Gold Cup at age 17. He was a winner at the Royal International Horse Show, Horse of the Year Show and at London Olympia, and became a household name.

== Death ==
In 1987 Ryan's Son died following an in-competition fall during the Hickstead Derby. It had not seemed a bad fall initially, and horse and rider walked out of the ring. However, three hours later, in a private stable of the master of Hickstead, Douglas Bunn, and with the vet in attendance, Ryan's Son collapsed suddenly and died, probably from an internal haemorrhage. John and his wife Clare, were there, so too was his mother Enid and father Donald.
