= Nick Skelton =

British equestrian (born 1958)

Nick Skelton CBE
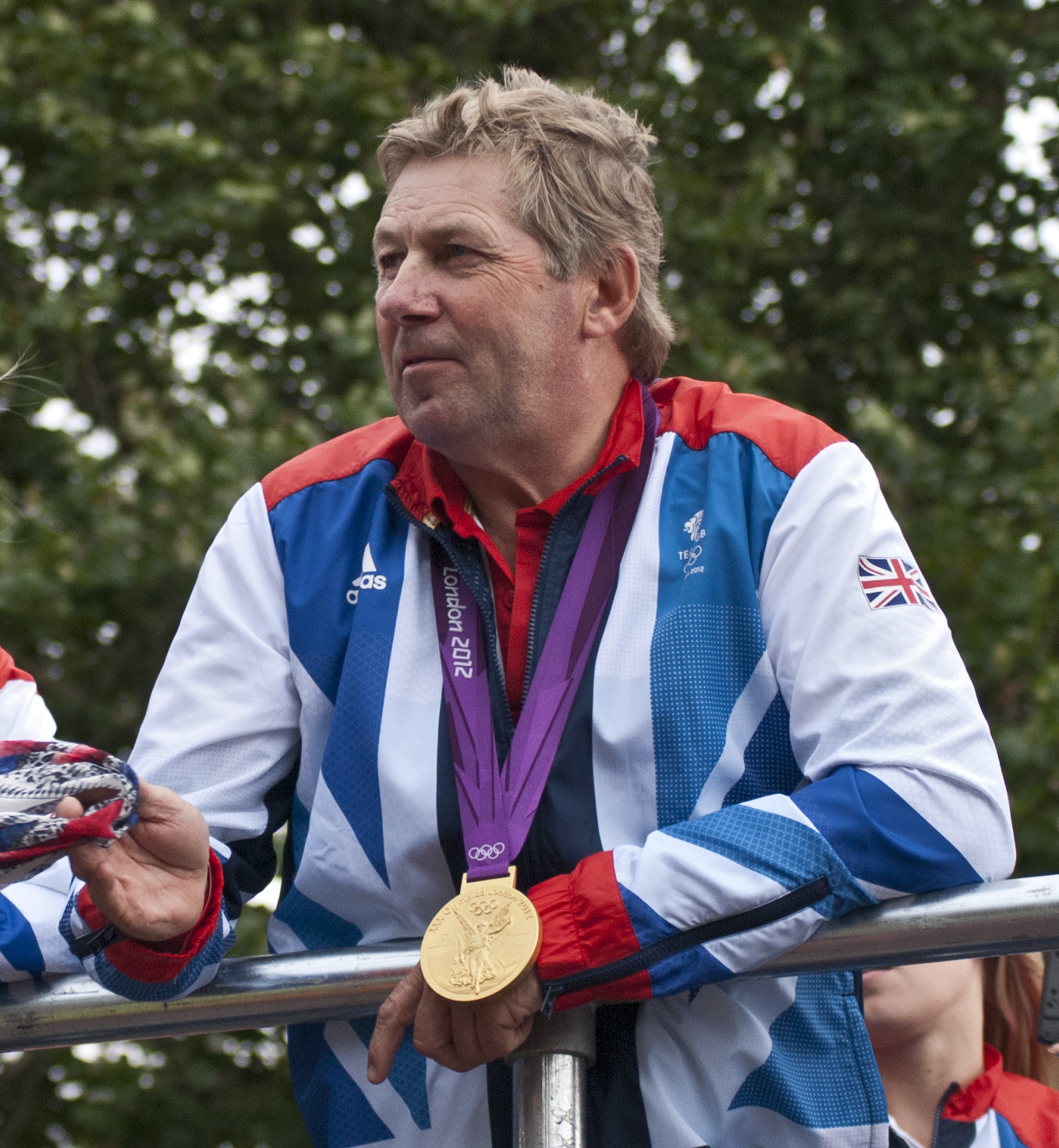

Personal information
- Full name: Nicholas David Skelton
- Nationality: British
- Discipline: Show jumping
- Born: 30 December 1957 (age 68); Bedworth, Warwickshire, England
Medal record
Representing Great Britain
Equestrian Showjumping
Olympic Games
Gold medal – first place	2012 London	Team Jumping
Gold medal – first place	2016 Rio de Janeiro	Individual jumping
Alternative Olympics
Silver medal – second place	1980 Rotterdam	Team jumping
World Championships
Silver medal – second place	1986 Aachen	Team jumping
Bronze medal – third place	1982 Dublin	Team jumping
Bronze medal – third place	1986 Aachen	Individual jumping
Bronze medal – third place	1990 Stockholm	Team jumping
Bronze medal – third place	1998 Rome	Team Jumping
European Championships
Gold medal – first place	1985 Dinard	Team jumping
Gold medal – first place	1987 St. Gallen	Team jumping
Gold medal – first place	1989 Rotterdam	Team jumping
Silver medal – second place	1991 La Baule	Team jumping
Silver medal – second place	1993 Gijón	Team jumping
Silver medal – second place	1995 St. Gallen	Team jumping
Bronze medal – third place	1987 St. Gallen	Individual jumping
Bronze medal – third place	2011 Madrid	Team jumping
Bronze medal – third place	2011 Madrid	Individual jumping
Junior European Championships
Gold medal – first place	1975 Dornbirn	Individual jumping
Silver medal – second place	1974 Lucerne	Team jumping
Silver medal – second place	1975 Dornbirn	Team jumping

Nicholas David Skelton (born 30 December 1957, Bedworth, Warwickshire, England) is a British former equestrian who competed in show jumping. He retired at the age of 59 years old, on 5 April 2017. He began riding at age 18 months and in 1975 took two team silvers and an individual gold at the Junior European Championships.

He has competed numerous times at the European Show Jumping Championships, winning three golds, three silvers and three bronzes both individually and with the British team over 26 years. In 1980, he competed in the Alternative Olympics, where he helped the British team to a silver medal. He currently holds the British show jumping high jump record, which he set in 1978.

His most notable successes occurred in back-to-back Olympic Games in the swansong of his career. In 2012, at the age of 54, Skelton won an Olympic gold medal as part of the Great Britain team. Four years later, he won the individual Olympic gold medal at his seventh Olympic Games. Having won both team and individual Olympic gold, Skelton and his horse, Big Star, retired together shortly after the 2016 Games.

== Education ==
Born in Bedworth, north Warwickshire, Skelton was educated at Bablake School in the city of Coventry in Central England.

== Career ==
Skelton rode in pony classes with little tuition before taking his pony to Ted and Liz Edgar for help when he was 14. He worked for and helped at the Edgars for two years before leaving school with no qualifications to work full-time for them. Skelton had plenty of early success with a horse called Maybe, but he went lame just before the Junior European Championships in 1975 and his place in the team looked lost. However, a reputedly ordinary horse, O.K., was brought in as a substitute and Skelton won individual gold. After this, he began riding more of the Edgar horses and in 1978, at Olympia, jumped just over 7 foot 7 inches on Lastic to set a new British record, which still stands. When Skelton partnered with St James the following year he broke into the senior GB team, of which he remained an integral part until his retirement.

In 1985, Skelton split from the Edgars and went on his own; his main horse at the time, Apollo, went with him and together they formed a partnership that won nearly all the top prizes in the sport, as well as many Championship medals. After Apollo, Skelton competed at the top level with many different horses before he teamed up with Dollar Girl in 1992 with the specific target of competing at the Barcelona Olympics. Despite the Olympics going badly for them, Skelton and Dollar Girl ultimately won the coveted World Cup Final in Gothenburg in 1995.

In September 2000, Skelton broke his neck in a fall while competing. The injury was serious and could have ended his show jumping career, but after retiring in 2001 he recovered and began competing again in 2002. Skelton returned to the saddle to partner Arko III, a horse he had ridden before breaking his neck. Skelton and Arko won the British Open title in 2004 at the British Open Show Jumping Championships and many other top prizes. Their most disappointing moment came at the Athens Olympics in 2004, where they were leading until the final round but finished out of the medals.

After Arko retired, Skelton revisited an old friend and owner, Gary Widdowson, for support and new horses. Gary and his wife Beverley bought, or co-bought with Skelton, a number of competition horses including Carlo 273, Skelton's European Individual Bronze medal partner, Big Star and Unique.

Following his Olympic 2012 gold medal, the post boxes in both Alcester, where he resides, and in Bedworth, where he was born, were painted gold in his honour.

Skelton won gold in the 2016 Rio de Janeiro Olympics in the individual category. In doing so he became the oldest British Olympic gold medallist since 1908. Following Skelton's success at the 2016 Rio de Janeiro Olympics, rail operator London Midland honoured him with a gold-painted sign at Bedworth railway station. Skelton received a nomination for the 2016 BBC Sports Personality of the Year Award. He received 109,197 votes, placing him third. He was appointed Commander of the Order of the British Empire (CBE) in the 2017 New Year Honours for services to equestrianism.

== Major achievements ==
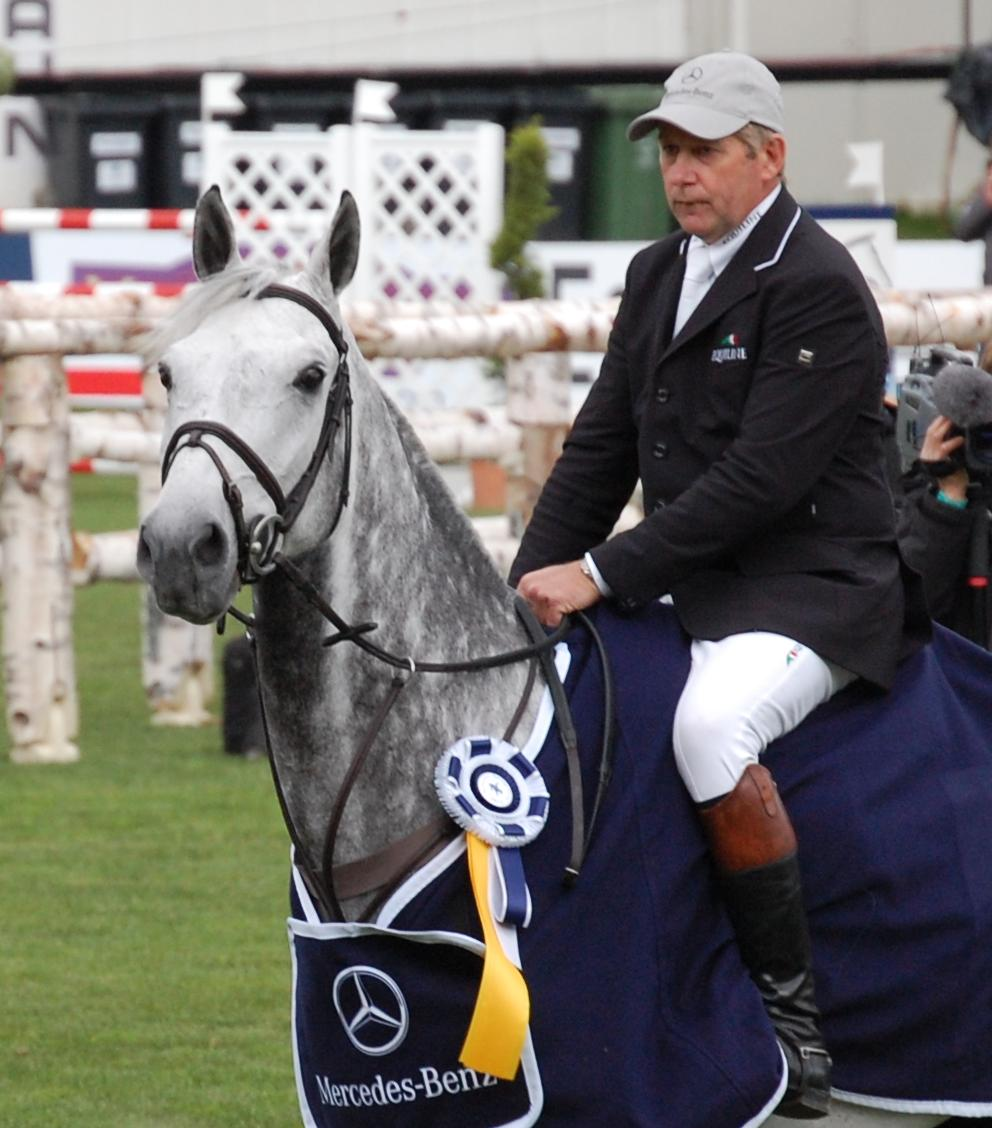
Nick Skelton with Carlo, 2012 CSI 5* Hamburg

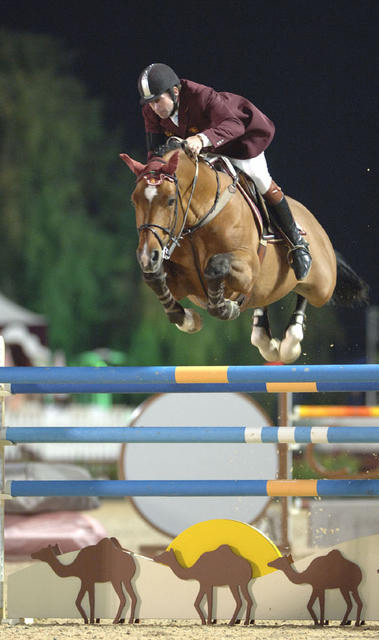
Nick Skelton with Arko

Skelton has had many successes at home and abroad and has ridden on over 164 Nations Cups teams (1978–2011). He has won various medals both as an Individual and as part of the teams in the Olympics, World Championships and European Championships between 1980 and 2016.

- Olympic Games
  - 2012: London. Team Gold medal with Big Star
  - 2016: Rio de Janeiro. Individual Gold medal with Big Star
- Alternative Olympic Games
  - 1980: Rotterdam. Team Silver medal with Maybe
- World championships
  - 1982: Dublin. Team Bronze medal with If Ever
  - 1986: Aachen. Team Silver medal and individual Bronze medal with Apollo
  - 1990: Stockholm. Team Bronze medal with Grand Slam
  - 1998: Rome. Team Bronze medal with Hopes are High
- European Championships
  - 1985: Dinard. Team Gold medal and individual 4th with St. James
  - 1987: St. Gallen. Team Gold medal and Individual Bronze medal with Apollo
  - 1989: Rotterdam. Team Gold medal with Apollo
  - 1991: La Baule. Team Silver medal with Phoenix Park
  - 1993: Gijón. Team Silver medal with Dollar Girl
  - 1995: St. Gallen. Team Silver medal with Dollar Girl
  - 2011: Madrid. Team Bronze and individual Bronze medal with Carlo 273
- Junior European Championships
  - 1974: Lucerne. Team Silver medal with Maybe
  - 1975: Dornbirn. Team Silver medal and individual Gold medal with O.K.
- Volvo World Cup Final
  - 1995: Gothenburg. Winner with Dollar Girl
- Hickstead Derby
  - 1987: Winner with J Nick
  - 1988: Winner with Apollo
  - 1989: Winner with Apollo
- King George V Gold Cup
  - 1984: Winner with St. James
  - 1993: Winner with Limited Edition
  - 1996: Winner with Cathleen III
  - 1999: Winner with Hopes are High

Skelton currently holds the British Show Jumping High Jump record, at 7 ft 7in 5/16th (2.32m) set at Olympia in 1978 with Lastic.

== Horses ==
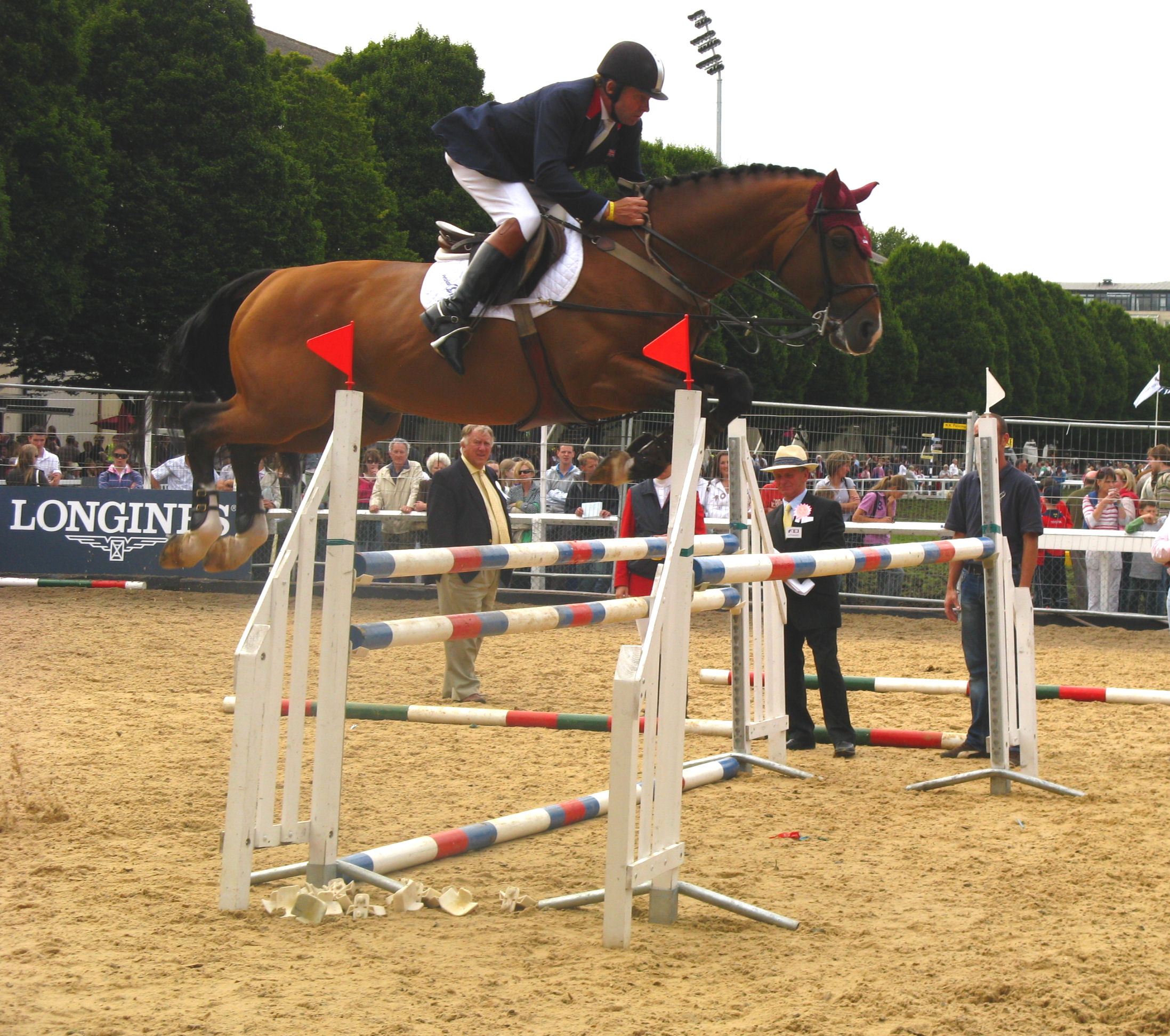
Nick Skelton & Arko III, Dublin 2008

Top horses that Skelton has ridden include Maybe, If Ever, Apollo, St. James, Major Wager, Top Gun, Grand Slam, Phoenix Park, Dollar Girl, Limited Edition, Showtime, Tinka's Boy, Hopes are High, Russel and Arko III.

Skelton's current top flight horses are Big Star, Carlo 273 and Unique, all of which are owned by Beverley Widdowson.

Skelton won team gold at his home Olympics in London 2012 with his horse Big Star, alongside Ben Maher, Peter Charles and Scott Brash.

== Career statistics ==
=== Individual wins ===
Year	Location	Class	Horse
2016	Rio de Janeiro, Brazil	2016 Olympics	Big Star
2012	Hamburg, Germany	GCT Grand Prix	Big Star
	La Baule, France	Grand Prix	Carlo 273
	Antwerp, Belgium	Grand Prix	Big Star
	Palm Beach, United States	Grand Prix	Big Star
2011	St. Gallen, Switzerland	Grand Prix	Carlo 273
2008	CSIO Spruce Meadows 'Masters' Tournament, Spruce Meadows, Canada	CN International Grand Prix	Arko III
	Grobbendonk, Belgium	Grand Prix	Arko
2007	Estoril, Portugal	Global Champions Tour Grand Prix	Arko
2006	Lucerne, Switzerland	Grand Prix	Arko
	Rome, Italy	Grand Prix	Arko
2005	Leipzig, Germany	World Cup Qualifier	Arko
	Spruce Meadows, Canada	Grand Prix	Arko
2004	(United Kingdom) Royal International Horse Show, Hickstead, Great Britain	Grand Prix	Russell
	(United Kingdom) British Open Show Jumping Championships, Sheffield, Great Britain	The British Open	Arko
	(United Kingdom) Royal Windsor, Great Britain	Grand Prix	Russell
2003	Leeuwarden, The Netherlands	Grand Prix	Arko
2002	Portimão, Portugal	Grand Prix	Arko
	Lizerias, Portugal	Grand Prix	Arko
2000	(United Kingdom) Royal Windsor, Great Britain	Grand Prix	Jalisco
1999	(United Kingdom) Royal International Horse Show, Hickstead, Great Britain	King George V Gold Cup	Hopes Are High
1998	Madrid, Spain	Grand Prix	Showtime
	Gijón, Spain	Grand Prix	Hopes Are High
	(Republic of Ireland) Dublin, Ireland	Grand Prix	Hope Are High
	CSIO Spruce Meadows 'Masters' Tournament, Spruce Meadows, Canada	Du Maurier Grand Prix	Hopes Are High
	Leeuwarden, The Netherlands	Grand Prix	Zalza
1997	Lisbon, Portugal	Grand Prix	Showtime
	(United Kingdom) Horse of the Year Show, Great Britain	Grand Prix	Showtime
1996	Bordeaux, France	World Cup Qualifier	Dollar Girl
	(United Kingdom) Royal International Horse Show, Hickstead, Great Britain	King George V Gold Cup	Cathleen III
	Moorsele, Italy	Grand Prix	Dollar Girl
	Madrid, Spain	Grand Prix	Showtime
	Gijón, Spain	Grand Prix	Dollar Girl
	(United Kingdom) Olympia, Great Britain	Masters	Zalza
1995	Gothenburg, Sweden	World Cup Final	Dollar Girl
	Barcelona, Spain	Grand Prix	Showtime
	San Marino, Italy	Grand Prix	Showtime
	(United Kingdom) Horse of the Year Show, Great Britain	Grand Prix	Showtime
	Aarhus, Denmark	Masters	Dollar Girl
	Stuttgart, Germany	Grand Prix	Dollar Girl
1994	(Republic of Ireland) Millstreet, Ireland	World Cup Qualifier	Dollar Girl
1993	Paris, France	Grand Prix	Major Wager
	Paris, France	World Cup Qualifier	Major Wager
	Gothenburg, Sweden	Grand Prix	Major Wager
	(United Kingdom) Royal International Horse Show, Hickstead, Great Britain	King George V Gold Cup	Limited Edition
	St. Gallen, Switzerland	Grand Prix	Dollar Girl
	(United Kingdom) Horse of the Year Show, Great Britain	Everest Final	Showtime
	Ascona, Switzerland	Grand Prix	Dollar Girl
	CSIO Spruce Meadows 'Masters' Tournament, Spruce Meadows, Canada	Du Maurier Grand Prix	Dollar Girl
1992	Genk, Belgium	Grand Prix	Major Wager
	Gothenburg, Sweden	Grand Prix	Major Wager
	Amsterdam, The Netherlands	Masters	Limited Edition
1991	(United Kingdom) Horse of the Year Show, Great Britain	Leading Showjumper of the Year	Phoenix Park
	(United Kingdom) Horse of the Year Show, Great Britain	Masters	Phoenix Park
	(Republic of Ireland) Dublin, Ireland	Grand Prix	Phoenix Park
1990	Kossen, Austria	Grand Prix	Fiorella
	Cortina, Italy	Grand Prix	Fiorella
	(Republic of Ireland) Dublin, Ireland	Grand Prix	Phoenix Park
	Dortmund, Germany	Grand Prix	Top Gun
	(United Kingdom) Horse of the Year Show, Great Britain	Grand Prix	Grand Slam
1989	(United Kingdom) Hickstead, Great Britain	Hickstead Derby	Apollo
1988	(United Kingdom) Hickstead, Great Britain	Hickstead Derby	Apollo
	(Republic of Ireland) Dublin, Ireland	Grand Prix	Apollo
	Aachen, Germany	Grand Prix	Apollo
1987	(United Kingdom) Hickstead, Great Britain	Hickstead Derby	J Nick
	Aachen, Germany	Grand Prix	Apollo
1985	Antwerp, Belgium	World Cup Qualifier	St James
	CSIO Spruce Meadows 'Masters' Tournament, Spruce Meadows, Canada	Du Maurier Grand Prix	St James
	(Republic of Ireland) Dublin, Ireland	Grand Prix	Apollo
	Toronto, Canada	World Cup Qualifier	Apollo
	New York City, United States	World Cup Qualifier	Apollo
1984	(United Kingdom) Royal International Horse Show, Hickstead, Great Britain	King George V Gold Cup	St James
1983	Toronto, Canada	World Cup Qualifier	St James
	(United Kingdom) Olympia, Great Britain	World Cup Qualifier	St James
	Aachen, Germany	Grand Prix	If Ever
1979	Geneva, Switzerland	World Cup Qualifier	Lastic
1978	(United Kingdom) Horse of the Year Show, Great Britain	Leading Showjumper of the Year	Maybe

=== Nation's Cup wins ===
Year	Location	Horse
2011	(Republic of Ireland) Dublin, Ireland	Carlo 273
2008	(Republic of Ireland) Dublin, Ireland	Arko III
2005	(Republic of Ireland) Dublin, Ireland	Arko III
2005	Rome, Italy	Arko III
2004	(United Kingdom) Hickstead, Great Britain	Russell
2003	(United Kingdom) Hickstead, Great Britain	Arko III
1997	Modena, Italy	Showtime
1997	(United Kingdom) Royal Windsor, Great Britain	Showtime
1997	Gijón, Spain	Tinka's Boy
1996	Lisbon, Portugal	Cathleen III
1996	(Republic of Ireland) Dublin, Ireland	Dollar Girl
1996	Calgary, Canada	Showtime
1993	(United Kingdom) Hickstead, Great Britain	Limited Edition
1992	(United Kingdom) Hickstead, Great Britain	Limited Edition
1992	Calgary, Canada	Dollar Girl
1991	Calgary, Canada	Phoenix Park
1991	(Republic of Ireland) Dublin, Ireland	Phoenix Park
1991	Rome, Italy	Apollo II
1991	Luembourg, Luxembourg	Phoenix Park
1990	Rome, Italy	Grand Slam
1990	Calgary, Canada	Grand Slam
1990	(Republic of Ireland) Dublin, Ireland	Phoenix Park
1990	New York City, United States	Grand Slam
1989	Luembourg, Luxembourg	Serenade
1989	(Republic of Ireland) Dublin, Ireland	Grand Slam
1989	Calgary, Canada	Grand Slam
1989	St. Gallen, Switzerland	Apollo
1988	(Republic of Ireland) Dublin, Ireland	Apollo
1988	Rome, Italy	Apollo
1987	Gijón, Spain	Airbourne
1986	Jerez de la Frontera, Spain	Apollo
1986	(Republic of Ireland) Dublin, Ireland	Apollo
1986	Toronto, Canada	Apollo
1986	Washington, D.C., United States	Apollo
1986	Rotterdam, Netherlands	Airbourne
1985	(Republic of Ireland) Dublin, Ireland	Apollo
1985	(United Kingdom) Hickstead, Great Britain	Apollo
1985	Calgary, Canada	Apollo
1984	Paris, France	St James
1984	Liège, Belgium	Apollo
1983	Paris, France	St James
1982	Lucerne, Switzerland	If Ever
1981	Aachen, Germany	Maybe
1979	Zuidlaren, The Netherlands	Maybe

=== International Championship Results ===
Results
Year	Event	Horse	Placing	Notes
1975	European Junior Championships	Everest OK	2nd place, silver medalist(s)	Team
1975	European Junior Championships	Everest OK	1st place, gold medalist(s)	Individual
1979	World Cup Final	Lastic	7th	
1980	World Championships	Maybe	2nd place, silver medalist(s)	Team
1980	World Championships	Maybe	25th	Individual
1981	World Cup Final	Maybe / If Ever	14th	
1982	World Cup Final	Everest Carat	8th	
1982	World Championships	If Ever	3rd place, bronze medalist(s)	Team
1982	World Championships	If Ever	48th	Individual
1983	World Cup Final	If Ever	16th	
1984	World Cup Final	St. James	7th	
1985	World Cup Final	St. James	2nd place, silver medalist(s)	
1985	European Championships	St. James	1st place, gold medalist(s)	Team
1985	European Championships	St. James	4th	Individual
1986	World Cup Final	St. James	28th	
1986	World Championships	Apollo	2nd place, silver medalist(s)	Team
1986	World Championships	Apollo	3rd place, bronze medalist(s)	Individual
1987	World Cup Final		12th	
1987	European Championships	Apollo	1st place, gold medalist(s)	Team
1987	European Championships	Apollo	3rd place, bronze medalist(s)	Individual
1988	World Cup Final	J. Nick	26th	
1988	Olympic Games	Apollo	6th	Team
1988	Olympic Games	Apollo	7th	Individual
1989	European Championships	Apollo	1st place, gold medalist(s)	Team
1989	European Championships	Apollo	18th	Individual
1990	World Cup Final	Grand Slam	6th	
1990	World Equestrian Games	Grand Slam	3rd place, bronze medalist(s)	Team
1990	World Equestrian Games	Grand Slam	20th	Individual
1991	World Cup Final	Grand Slam	41st	
1991	European Championships	Phoenix Park	2nd place, silver medalist(s)	Team
1991	European Championships	Phoenix Park	17th	Individual
1992	Olympic Games	Dollar Girl	7th	Team
1992	Olympic Games	Dollar Girl	70th	Individual
1993	World Cup Final	Major Wager	28th	
1993	European Championships	Dollar Girl	2nd place, silver medalist(s)	Team
1993	European Championships	Dollar Girl	16th	Individual
1994	World Equestrian Games	Dollar Girl	6th	Team
1994	World Equestrian Games	Dollar Girl	22nd	Individual
1995	World Cup Final	Dollar Girl	1st place, gold medalist(s)	
1996	World Cup Final	Dollar Girl	3rd place, bronze medalist(s)	
1996	Olympic Games	Show Time	11th	Team
1996	Olympic Games	Show Time	23rd	Individual
1997	World Cup Final	Show Time	12th	
1998	World Equestrian Games	Hopes Are High	3rd place, bronze medalist(s)	Team
1998	World Equestrian Games	Hopes Are High	27th	Individual
1999	European Championships	Hopes Are High	4th	Team
1999	European Championships	Hopes Are High	24th	Individual
2003	European Championships	Arko III	9th	Team
2003	European Championships	Arko III	26th	Individual
2004	Olympic Games	Arko III	10th	Individual
2005	World Cup Final	Arko III	22nd	
2005	European Championships	Arko III	25th	Individual
2006	World Equestrian Games	Russel	9th	Team
2006	World Equestrian Games	Russel	30th	Individual
2008	Olympic Games	Russel	5th	Team
2008	Olympic Games	Russel	28th	Individual
2011	European Championships	Carlo 273	3rd place, bronze medalist(s)	Team
2011	European Championships	Carlo 273	3rd place, bronze medalist(s)	Individual
2012	Olympic Games	Big Star	1st place, gold medalist(s)	Team
2012	Olympic Games	Big Star	5th	Individual
2016	Olympic Games	Big Star	12th	Team
2016	Olympic Games	Big Star	1st place, gold medalist(s)	Individual

== Personal life ==
Skelton has two sons with his first wife Sarah Skelton (née Edwards) and both are active in horse racing. Daniel is a National Hunt trainer, and Harry is a National Hunt jockey who in 2009 became the youngest winner of the Irish Grand National on Niche Market and in 2020 won the Queen Mother Champion Chase at the Cheltenham Festival.

He was appointed Officer of the Order of the British Empire (OBE) in the 2012 Birthday Honours for services to equestrian sport.

In 2001, Skelton published an autobiography, Only Falls And Horses and wrote a second, Gold, in 2018.

== See also ==
- 2012 Olympics gold post boxes in the United Kingdom

== Bibliography ==
- Skelton, N. (2001) Only Falls and Horses. Greenwater.
