= British Jumping Derby =

Annual showjumping event in West Sussex, England

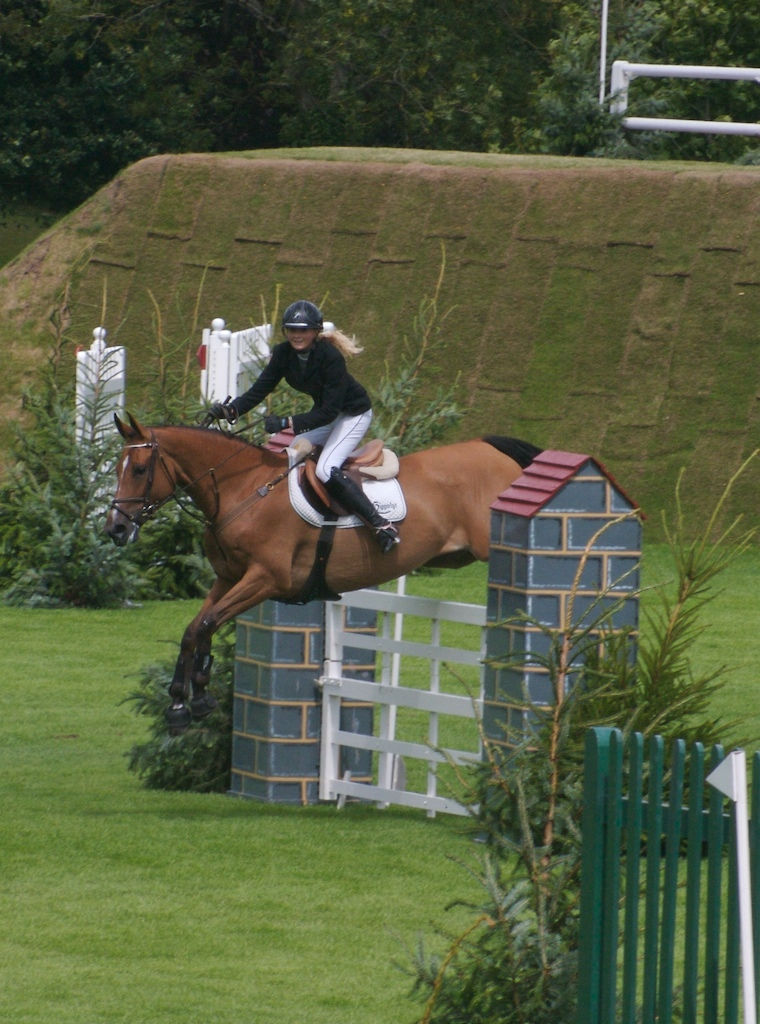
Hickstead Derby in 2009

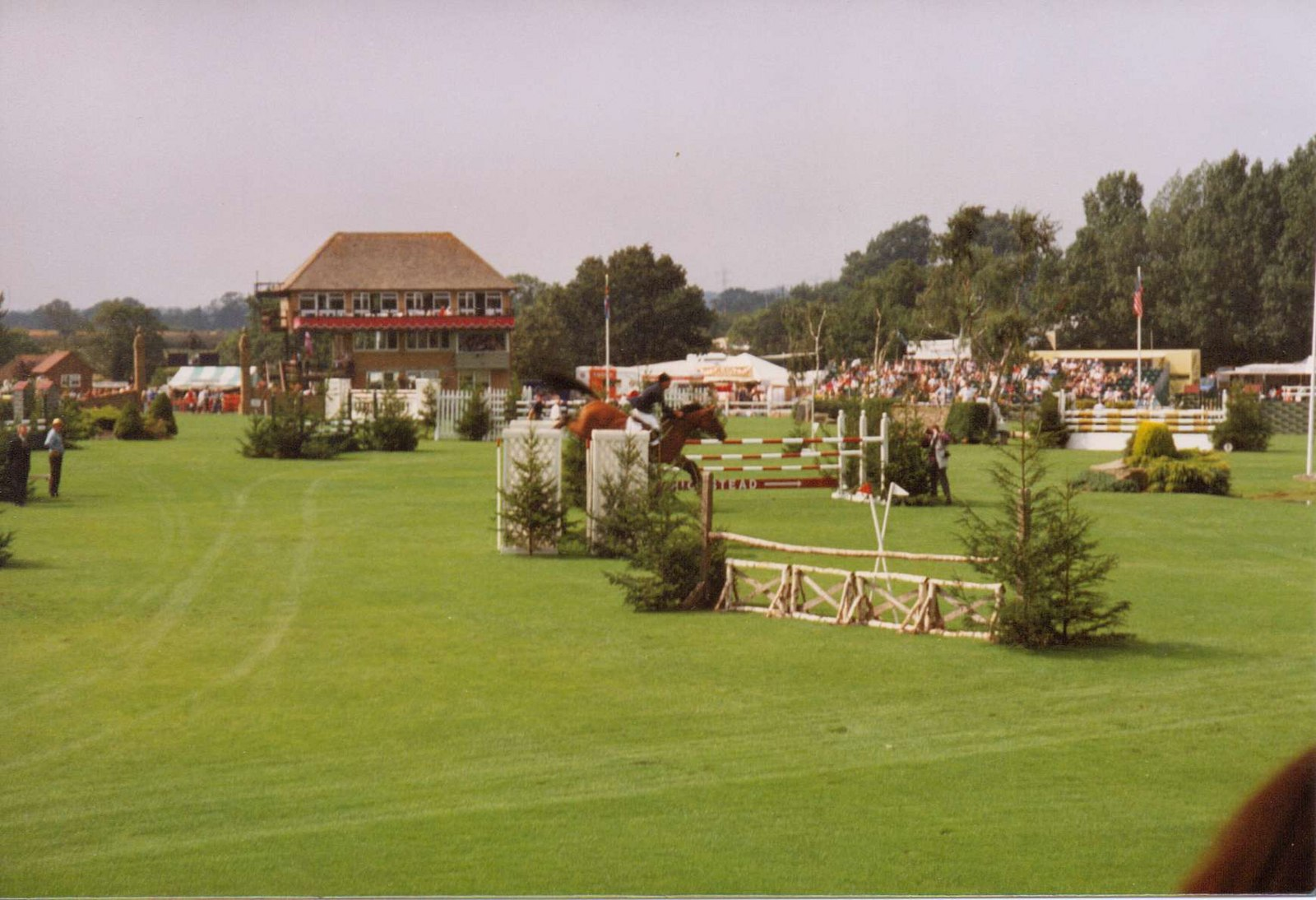
The grounds in 1996

The British Jumping Derby meeting – known for sponsorship reasons as the Al Shira'aa Hickstead Derby Meeting – is an annual showjumping event held since 1961 at the Hickstead in June every year. It is considered one of the premier events in the equestrian calendar.

A highlight of the meeting is the Al Shira'aa Derby, a 1,195-metre course with tricky jumps including the aptly named Devil's Dyke – three fences in short succession with a water-filled ditch in the middle and the difficult Derby Bank, a jump with 3 ft 5in rails on top and a 10 ft 6in slope down the front.

The British Jumping Derby is one of those events a bit like the Grand National where it's not just the runners and riders that make the headlines but the course itself. It's an iconic showjumping contest, the like of which you won't find anywhere else in the world, no other course asks this much of a test of horse and rider and no other course creates this type of drama.

— Clare Balding, BBC Sport

The course is known for its challenging nature that has changed little since its inception. As of 2022, there were only 64 clear rounds since the event's start in 1961.

== Derby fences ==
The main arena is used for a number of classes throughout the meeting (and at the Royal International Horse Show amongst others), but the main Derby class always follows the same class, consisting of the following fences of 21 jumping efforts:

Fence name	Height	Width	Notes
1. The Cornishman	4 ft 8 in (1.42 m)		Solid stone wall with a pole
2. white oxer	4 ft 3 in (1.30 m)	6 ft 6 in (1.98 m)	
3. a.& b. double water ditches	5 ft (1.5 m) & 5 ft 2 in (1.57 m)		
4. black gate	5 ft 3 in (1.60 m)		maximum height fence for the course, upright and falls easily
5. wall	5 ft 3 in (1.60 m)		
6. privet hedge oxer	4 ft 11 in (1.50 m)	6 ft 6 in (1.98 m)	
7. a. & b. road jump	5 ft (1.5 m) and 5 ft 2 in (1.57 m)		table fence with no exit except over jumps
8. Derby Bank	10 ft 6 in (3.20 m) drop with 3 ft 5 in (1.04 m) high fence before		iconic obstacle of the course. fence 16 ft from main drop which horses must slide down
9. white rails	5 ft 3 in (1.60 m)		two strides from bottom of bank
10. a., b. & c. Devil's Dyke	4 ft 9 in (1.45 m), 4 ft 9 in (1.45 m), 4 ft 8 in (1.42 m)		closed obstacle, but sloping ground increases apparent fence height to near 6 ft (1.8 m)
11. open water		15 ft (4.6 m)	
12. Derby rails	5 ft 3 in (1.60 m)		
13. open ditch	5 ft 1 in (1.55 m)	6 ft (1.8 m)	
14. balustrades	5 ft 3 in (1.60 m)		
15. a. & b. double of gates	4 ft 10 in (1.47 m), 4 ft 10 in (1.47 m)	5 ft 6 in (1.68 m)	
16. rustic spread	4 ft 10 in (1.47 m)	6 ft 6 in (1.98 m)	

== Results ==
The results of the main British Jumping Derby class at the show are as follows:

Year	Rider	Country	Horse	Ref
1961	Seamus Hayes	IRL	Goodbye III	
1962	Pat Smythe	GBR	Flanagan	
1963	Nelson Pessoa	BRA	Gran Geste	
1964	Seamus Hayes	IRL	Goodbye III	
1965	Nelson Pessoa	BRA	Gran Geste	
1966	David Broome	GBR	Mister Softee	
1967	Marion Coakes	GBR	Stroller	
1968	Alison Westwood	GBR	The Maverick III	
1969	Anneli Drummond-Hay	GBR	Xanthos II	
1970	Harvey Smith	GBR	Mattie Brown	
1971	Harvey Smith	GBR	Mattie Brown	
1972	Hendrik Snoek	GER	Shirokko	
1973	Alison Dawes (Westwood)	GBR	Mr. Banbury	
1974	Harvey Smith	GBR	Salvador	
1975	Paul Darragh	IRL	Pele	
1976	Eddie Macken	IRL	Boomerang	
1977	Eddie Macken	IRL	Boomerang	
1978	Eddie Macken	IRL	Boomerang	
1979	Eddie Macken	IRL	Boomerang	
1980	Michael Whitaker	GBR	Owen Gregory	
1981	Harvey Smith	GBR	Sanyo Video	
1982	Paul Schockemöhle	GER	Deister	
1983	John Whitaker	GBR	Ryan's Son	
1984	John Ledingham	IRL	Gabhran	
1985	Paul Schockemöhle	GER	Lorenzo	
1986	Paul Schockemöhle	GER	Deister	
1987	Nick Skelton	GBR	J Nick	
1988	Nick Skelton	GBR	Apollo	
1989	Nick Skelton	GBR	Apollo	
1990	Jozsef Turi	GBR	Vital	
1991	Michael Whitaker	GBR	Monsanta	
1992	Michael Whitaker	GBR	Monsanta	
1993	Michael Whitaker	GBR	Monsanta	
1994	John Ledingham	IRL	Kilbaha	
1995	John Ledingham	IRL	Kilbaha	
1996	Nelson Pessoa	BRA	Loro Piana Vivaldi	
1997	John Popely	GBR	Bluebird	
1998	John Whitaker	GBR	Gammon	
1999	Rob Hoekstra	GBR	Lionel II	
2000	John Whitaker	GBR	Welham	
2001	Peter Charles	IRL	Corrada	
2002	Peter Charles	IRL	Corrada	
2003	Peter Charles	IRL	Corrada	
2004	John Whitaker	GBR	Buddy Bunn	
2005	Ben Maher	GBR	Alfredo II	
2006	William Funnell	GBR	Cortaflex Mondriaan	
2007	Geoff Billington	GBR	Cassabachus	
2008	William Funnell	GBR	Cortaflex Mondriaan	
2009	William Funnell	GBR	Cortaflex Mondriaan	
2010	Guy Williams	GBR	Skip Two Ramiro	
2011	Tina Fletcher	GBR	Promised Land	
2012	Paul Beecher	IRL	Loughnatousa WB	
2013	Phillip Miller	GBR	Caritiar Z	
2014	Trevor Breen	IRL	Adventure De Kannan	
2015	Trevor Breen	IRL	Loughnatousa W B	
2016	William Whitaker	GBR	Glenavadra Brilliant	
2017	Nigel Coupe	GBR	Golvers Hill	
2018	William Funnell	GBR	Billy Buckingham	
2019	Michael Pender	IRL	Hearton Du Bois	
2022	Shane Breen	IRL	Z7 Canya Makan	
2023	David Simpson	IRL	Pjotr Van De Kruishoeve	
2024	William Funnell	GBR	Dublon	

In 2019, Michael Pender became the youngest ever winner of the Hickstead Derby, taking the title from Marion Coakes when she won the Derby in 1967 on Stroller. Four riders have won the Hickstead Derby four times apiece - Eddie Macken, Harvey Smith, John Whitaker, and Michael Whitaker. In 2024 William Funnell became the first rider to win the event five times. In 2020 and 2021, the Hickstead Derby did not run because of the Coronavirus pandemic.

== Incidents ==
- 1972 – Chamusca Lad, ridden by Ann Backhouse was euthanized after falling on landing from the Derby Bank.
- 1987 – Ryan's Son, the 1983 winner of the competition, fell during his round on the course. The fall did not initially appear serious, and the horse walked back to the stabling area where he collapsed and died.
- 2004 – GG Barock was euthanized after breaking a rear leg while landing from the Derby Bank. After the incident, event organizers made changes to the Derby Bank to make the obstacle more friendly to equine competitors.
- 2018 – Navalo de Poheton, ridden by Andrew Kocher (USA) broke a leg while competing in the Derby and was fatally injured. It was the horse's last competition before retirement.

== Sponsorship ==
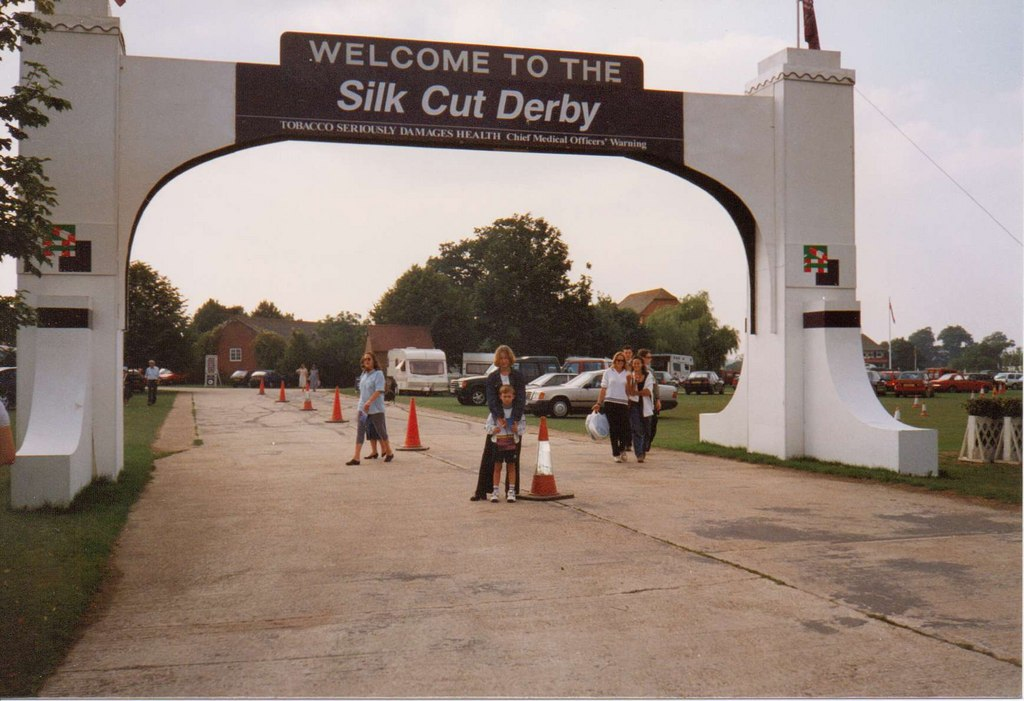
Previous sponsor Silk Cut

Title sponsors in recent years have included furniture retailer DFS, floor and bed furnishing retailer carpetright and online retailer Equestrian.com. The current title sponsors are Al Shira'aa, who have signed a three-year deal as title sponsor of the event, now known as the Al Shira'aa Hickstead Derby meeting.

== See also ==
- All England Jumping Course at Hickstead
- Royal International Horse Show
