= William Funnell =

British showjumper (born 1966)

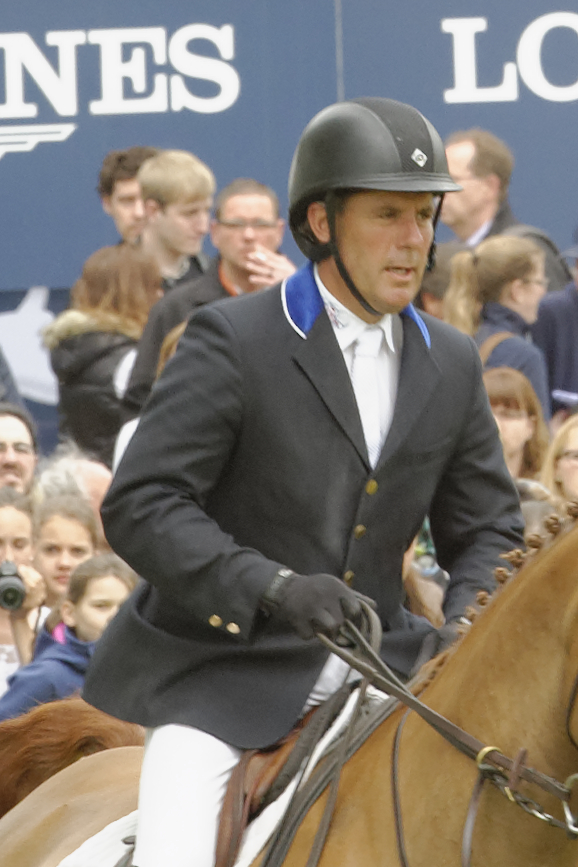

Personal information
- Full name: William Funnell
- Nationality: British
- Discipline: Show jumping
- Born: 10 February 1966 (age 60); Ashford, England
Medal record
Representing Great Britain
European Championships
Gold medal – first place	2013 Herning	Team jumping

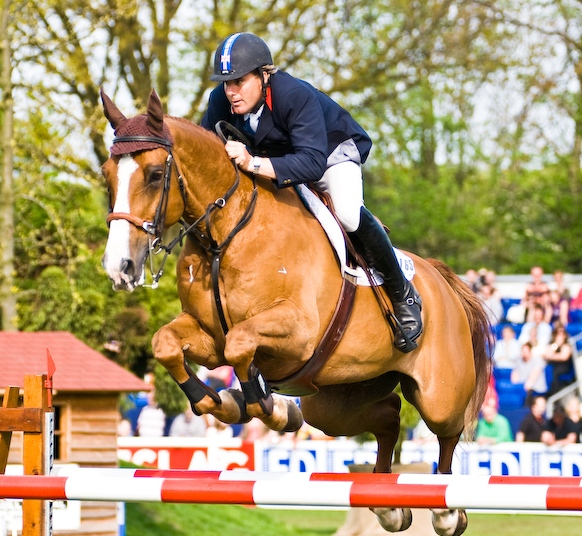
William Funnell with Billy Birr, Grand Prix of Eindhoven, Internationaal Concours Hippique Eindhoven (CSI 3*) 2008

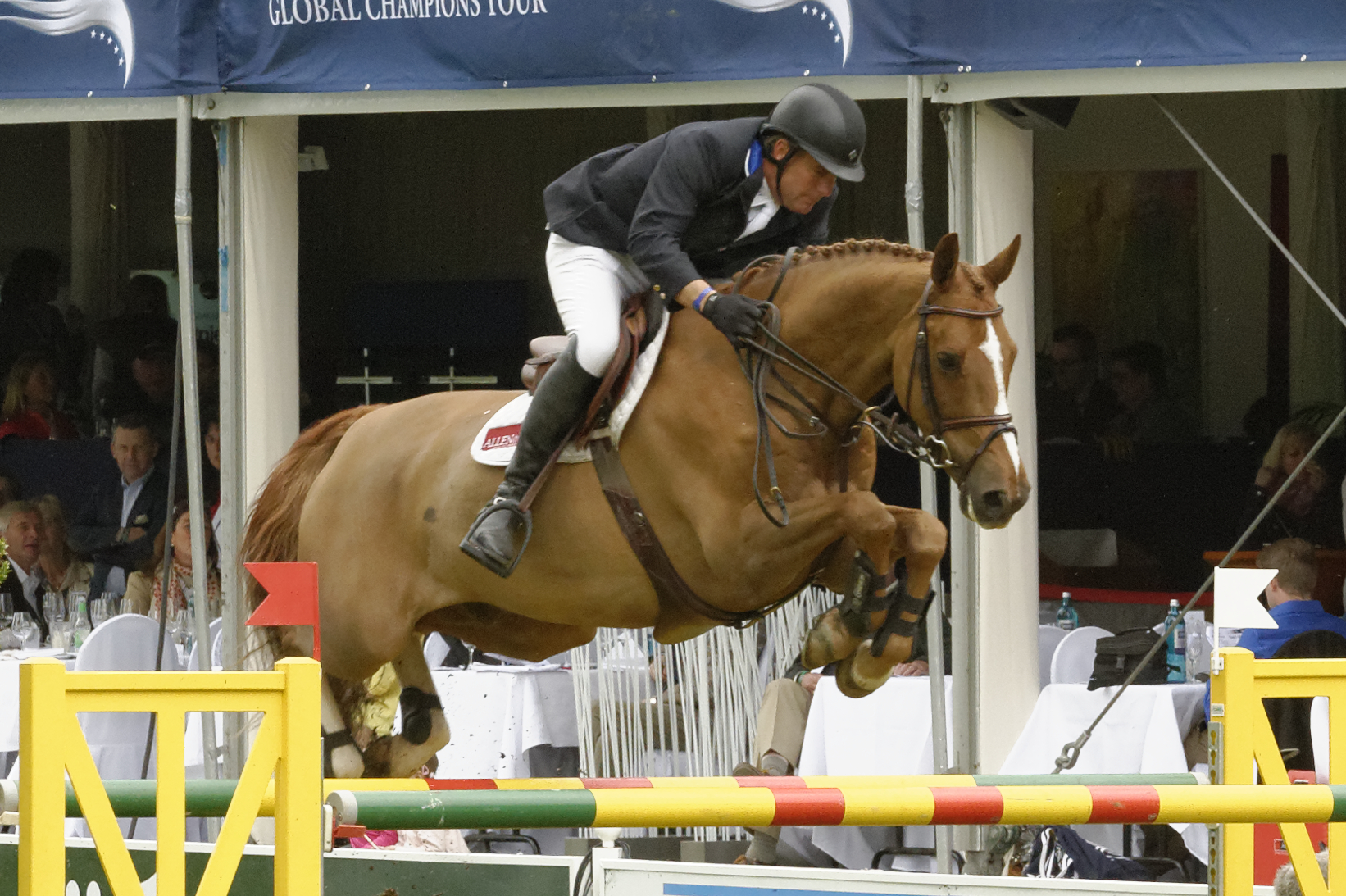
William Funnell with Billy Angelo at Internationales Pfingstturnier Wiesbaden 2013

William Ross Norman Funnell (born 10 February 1966) is a top-class showjumper.

== Career ==
Funnell has represented Britain internationally in many Nations Cup teams. In 2006 he won the Hickstead Derby for the first time and won it again two years later in 2008 and again in 2009. In 2018 William became one of five riders to win the Hickstead Derby four times, joining Harvey Smith, John and Michael Whitaker, and Eddie Macken. He also won the famous derby of La Baule in France in May 2011.

== Personal life ==
Funnell is married to eventer Pippa Funnell. He married her in October 1993 in Uckfield. They live in Ockley in south Surrey where they have a stud farm to breed horses. They became the first husband and wife to be inducted into The British Horse Society Equestrian Hall of Fame when William joined Pippa (2005) in being inducted in 2014.

== External links and references ==
- His website
