= Sefton (army horse) =

British Army horse

- Sefton being honoured as 'Horse of the Year', 1982
- Species: Equus ferus caballus
- Sex: Male
- Born: July 1963; County Waterford, Ireland
- Died: 9 July 1993 (aged 29–30); Speen, Buckinghamshire
- Resting place: Defence Animal Training Regiment, Melton Mowbray
- Occupation: Military cavalry horse
- Years active: 1967–1984
- Owner: British Army
- Height: 16.1 hands (1.7 m)
- Awards: Horse of the year, 1982; British Horse Society's equestrian Hall of Fame

Sefton (1963–1993) was a British Army horse who served for 17 years from 1967 to 1984, coming to prominence when he was critically injured in the Hyde Park and Regent's Park bombings which, combined, killed seven other horses and eleven people. He recovered sufficiently to return to active service and was subsequently awarded "Horse of the Year". Sefton became one of the first horses to be placed in the British Horse Society's equestrian Hall of Fame, and with an annual award named after him.

== Early life ==
Sefton was born in July 1963 in County Waterford, Ireland, as a cross between an Irish Draught mare and a local thoroughbred stallion (thought to have been called Honour's Choice). He was purchased as a two-year-old by local Michael Connors, who then took him as a four-year-old to the nearby Pallas Stud to be inspected by the Army Purchasing Commission on 1 June 1967, who chose him immediately, paying the then standard £275.

He was then shipped via ferry from Dublin along with 25 other three-year-old and four-year-old horses destined for the King's Troop, Royal Horse Artillery and the Household Cavalry. Here, he was named Sefton after Lord Sefton, a former Household Cavalry officer, but was nicknamed 'Sharky' in the stable, due to his predilection for biting.

In September 1967 he was moved to Wellington Barracks, London, and assigned to the Household Cavalry Mounted Regiment, where he was broken in by Trooper McGregor, taking a longer than average time to be broken, as he was not quick to submit to rider commands. He 'passed out' in June 1968 and had his regimental number 5/816 marked on his hind hooves.

However, by the summer of 1969, Sefton had gained a reputation for being difficult, and for breaking ranks, fidgeting and napping. For these reasons, Sefton was sent with the Blues and Royals on deployment to Germany. He joined the Weser Vale Hunt, a bloodhound pack set up by Captain Bill Stringer, chasing volunteer runners. He quickly became the whipper-in's mount and excelled in this task, with a bold jump and fast pace. This made him very popular and, due to his nature, he was not given to recruits to learn on, but offered as a prize for the best recruits to ride.

He was also competed in showjumping, and whilst on deployment between 1969 and 1974 won 1,434 Deutschmarks of prize money and was included in the army team competing for the British Army of the Rhine, as well as competing in (and winning) a point to point race.

In 1975, there was an outbreak of strangles at Knightsbridge Barracks, leaving a shortage of large, black horses for ceremonial duties in London. At this time, Sefton had a suspect tendon, possibly due to being overridden, and was immediately chosen to return to England. Here he worked for the Household Cavalry for the next four years, performing guard duties, as well as appearing in Quadrilles, and tent pegging. He continued to showjump, including appearances at the Royal Tournament and other smaller shows, although from 1980 he was gradually retired from the sport as he reached the age of 18.

== The IRA bombing ==
The scene at Hyde Park following the bombing, showing Sefton's stable mates who did not survive the attack

On 20 July 1982 at 10.40am Sefton was en route to the traditional Changing of the Guard, with 15 other horses from his regiment. A car-mounted nail bomb planted by the IRA detonated on South Carriage Drive in Hyde Park, hitting the formation of horses and riders from the Blues and Royals.

Two soldiers were killed on the scene, with two further soldiers dying of their wounds later. The blast injured all the horses, seven of them so badly that they were shot at the scene to relieve their suffering. Those that died were called Cedric, Epaulette, Falcon, Rochester, Waterford, Yeastvite and Zara. Sefton and eight of his stablemates also sustained injuries, although Sefton's were the most serious of the surviving horses. Echo, a "grey" Metropolitan Police horse who was escorting the troop, was hit by shrapnel and Yeti, a "Cav Black", although not physically wounded, suffered nerve damage and was traumatised by the attack. A second explosion, which occurred under a bandstand two hours later in Regent's Park, killed a further seven soldiers.

The sound of the explosion alerted a number of soldiers still in the barracks, and many of them ran to the scene, including regimental commander Andrew Parker Bowles and veterinary officer Major Noel Carding. Initially Parker Bowles ordered Sefton's handler to take off his shirt to staunch the horses bleeding; this proved impossible as the groom's hand had been pierced by a four-inch nail. Another soldier was ordered to use his shirt and to apply pressure to Sefton's severe neck wound,

Sefton was the worst injured and I knew that we had to get him back if there was to be any chance of saving him

— Major Noel Carding, Veterinary Officer of the Household Cavalry, and one of the first on scene

Due to the severity of his wounds, Sefton was led in to the first horsebox to arrive on scene, where he was driven to the barracks along with Major Carding, Farrier-Major Brian Smith and three other troopers holding Sefton. Carding ordered the horsebox to the forge, rather than the stables, due to its proximity. Here, Carding began 90 minutes of emergency operation to save Sefton's life – the first of the British Army's veterinary officers to operate on war wounds to a cavalry horse in more than half a century – whilst also directing care of the other wounded horses prior to the arrival of civilian vets to assist.

Carding, the civilian vets, farriers and troopers managed to save all of the horses who were brought back to barracks from the explosion scene.

== The recovery ==
Sefton endured eight hours of surgery – a record length for horse surgery in 1982.

It was a miracle of expert and prompt veterinary attention which saved Sefton's life but he required further surgery and three weeks later was moved to the Veterinary Hospital of the Royal Army Veterinary Corps (RAVC) at the Defence Animal Centre (DAC) Melton Mowbray where more pieces of metal were removed.

During his time in the hospital he received huge quantities of cards and mints; donations exceeding £620,000 were received to construct a new surgical wing at Royal Veterinary College which was named the Sefton Surgical Wing.

== Horse of the Year ==
Sefton returned to his duties with his regiment in 1982 and he often passed the exact spot where he had received such horrific injuries. That year he was awarded Horse of the Year, and with Pederson back in the saddle took centre stage at the Horse of the Year Show.

== Retirement ==
On 29 August 1984 Sefton retired from the Household Cavalry, and moved to the Home of Rest For Horses at Speen, Buckinghamshire, along with Echo, a police horse who had also survived the explosion, but had been made nervous of traffic and crowds and was unable to continue working. He lived at the centre until the age of 30, before having to be put down on 9 July 1993 due to incurable lameness as a complication of the injuries suffered during the bombing. He was buried at the Defence Animal Training Regiment, Melton Mowbray, Leicestershire.

== Commemoration ==
Following his experience, Sefton became one of the first horses to be placed in the British Horse Society's equestrian Hall of Fame, and with an annual award named after him.

In 2013, a statue of Sefton was unveiled at the Royal Veterinary College in honour of the retired Professor Peter Lees and funded by Lord Ballyedmond.

== See also ==
- List of historical horses
