= Paul Darragh =

Irish equestrian

Personal information
- Full name: Paul Darragh
- Nationality: Ireland
- Discipline: Show jumping
- Born: 28 April 1953; Killiney, Republic of Ireland
- Died: 3 January 2005 (aged 51); Ashbourne, Republic of Ireland
- Height: 5 ft 3 in (1.60 m)
- Weight: 132 lb (60 kg; 9 st 6 lb)

Paul Darragh (28 April 1953 – 3 January 2005) was an Irish equestrian who competed in the sport of show jumping. He was on the winning team in the Aga Khan Trophy three years in a row from 1977 to 1979 with the mare Heather Honey. He was also on the winning team in 1997. In an international career that spanned a quarter of a century, he joined with Eddie Macken, Con Power and James Kernan in an Irish team that captured the public imagination as they won the Aga Khan Trophy three years in a row from 1977 to 1979. A full 20 years after the first of those successes, Darragh was on the team that won the trophy again in 1997, his last major win on an Irish team. Other highlights included wins in the Hickstead Derby on Pele and the Dublin Grand Prix on Carrolls Trigger. In total, he represented Ireland 54 times in Nations Cups.

== Personal life ==
Paul Darragh was born to Austin Darragh and Terry Roddy on 28 April 1953. His father was known for founding the Irish Cancer Society, formerly known as the Conquer Cancer Campaign.

Paul Darragh died suddenly at his home in Meath aged 51.
