= Eddie Macken =

Irish equestrian

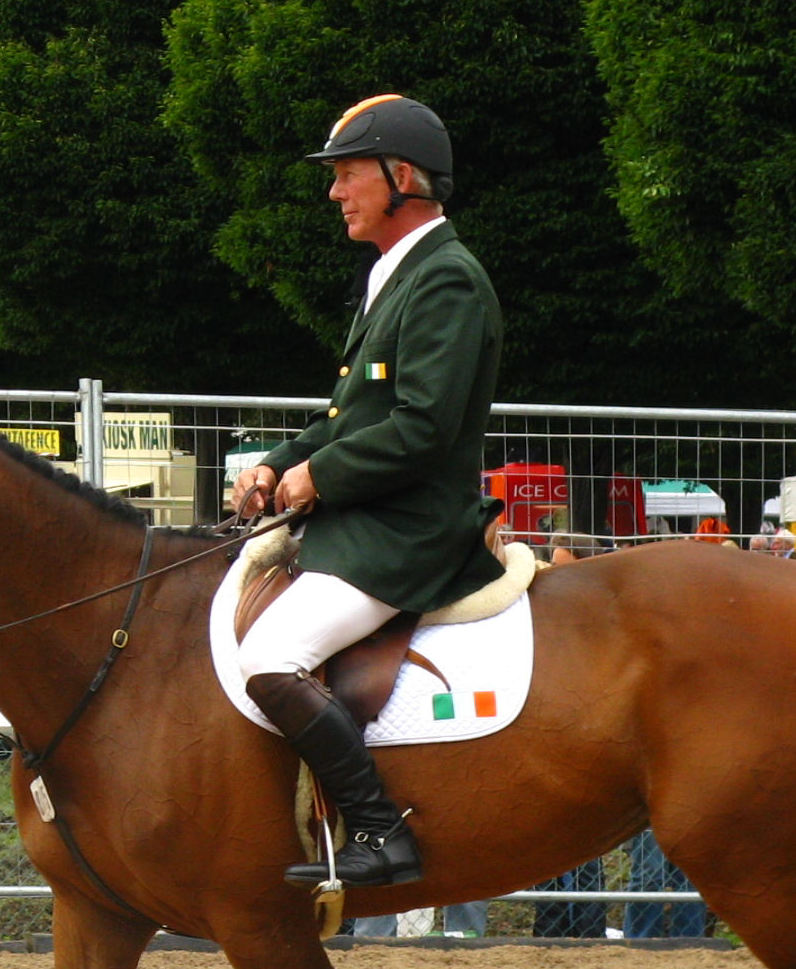

Personal information
- Full name: Eddie Macken
- Nationality: Ireland
- Discipline: Show jumping
- Born: 20 October 1949 (age 76); Granard, Ireland
- Height: 6 ft 0 in (1.83 m)
- Weight: 174 lb (79 kg; 12 st 6 lb)
Medal record
Representing Ireland
Equestrian
World Championships
Silver medal – second place	1974 Hickstead	Individual jumping
Silver medal – second place	1978 Aachen	Individual jumping
European Championships
Silver medal – second place	1977 Vienna	Individual jumping
Bronze medal – third place	1979 Rotterdam	Team jumping

Eddie Macken (born 20 October 1949 in Granard, Longford, Ireland) is an Irish equestrian show jumper, who was a member of the Irish team - along with Paul Darragh, Capt. Con Power, and James Kernan – that won the Aga Khan Cup three years in a row (1977 to 79). Other notable career highlights include a record four consecutive Hickstead Derby wins (1976 to 79), two individual silver medals at the Show Jumping World Championships, 1974 with Pele and 1978 on Boomerang, and an individual silver medal at the 1977 European Championships with Pele. Macken has many major Grand Prix victories worldwide. Many of Macken's achievements were gained in partnership with his Irish bred gelding, Boomerang. From Macken's first rides with Boomerang as a four-year-old in 1970, the pair blazed a trail of wins that lasted a decade.

== Olympic involvement ==
Macken represented Ireland at the Olympic Games in 1992 Barcelona (on Welfrenkone finishing 75th individually – team 14th) and in 1996 Atlanta (on Schalkaar finishing 37th individually – team 8th), and as team trainer in 2004 (Athens).

Controversy swirled around the Irish team during the 2004 Olympics. Originally selected as team trainer, Macken was sacked in June 2004 after a power struggle with Chef d'Équipe Tommy Wade, an event that came to be known as the "Macken Sackin' Affair". A group of senior Irish riders complained, and in July Macken was reinstated as team trainer and Wade was removed as Team Manager. Top team rider Cian O'Connor chose to stay out of the controversy and continue to support Wade, which raised the ire of some fellow riders. All seemed well as O'Connor went on to win the individual gold medal, and the team overall finished 7th. However the gold medal was later stripped when O'Connor's horse - Waterford Crystal - tested positive for a banned substance.

== Later career ==
Eddie Macken in Canada

After moving to Canada in the early 2000s (decade), Macken became based at New Kells Farm in Langley, British Columbia and participated on the North American show jumping circuit. In 2008, Eddie Macken was asked by the Irish showjumping team manager and Chef d'Équipe Robert Splaine to jump at the Failte Ireland Dublin Horse Show 2008 as part of the Aga Khan Nations Cup team. It was Macken's first time on an Irish equestrian team in more than a decade. The Irish team finished 2nd behind Great Britain, but later lost this placing after Macken was charged with a technical violation regarding doping tests by the FEI.

In 2010, 61-year-old Macken rode the Argentinian Warmblood Macuco to win one of the opening classes during the CSI "North American" competition at Spruce Meadows.

== Film ==
A documentary on Macken and Boomerang's partnership, Eddie Macken and Boomerang was produced and broadcast by BBC Northern Ireland in 1982.

== See also ==
- Ireland at the 2004 Summer Olympics
- List of Irish sports people
