= Derby Bank =

Equestrian jump at Hickstead

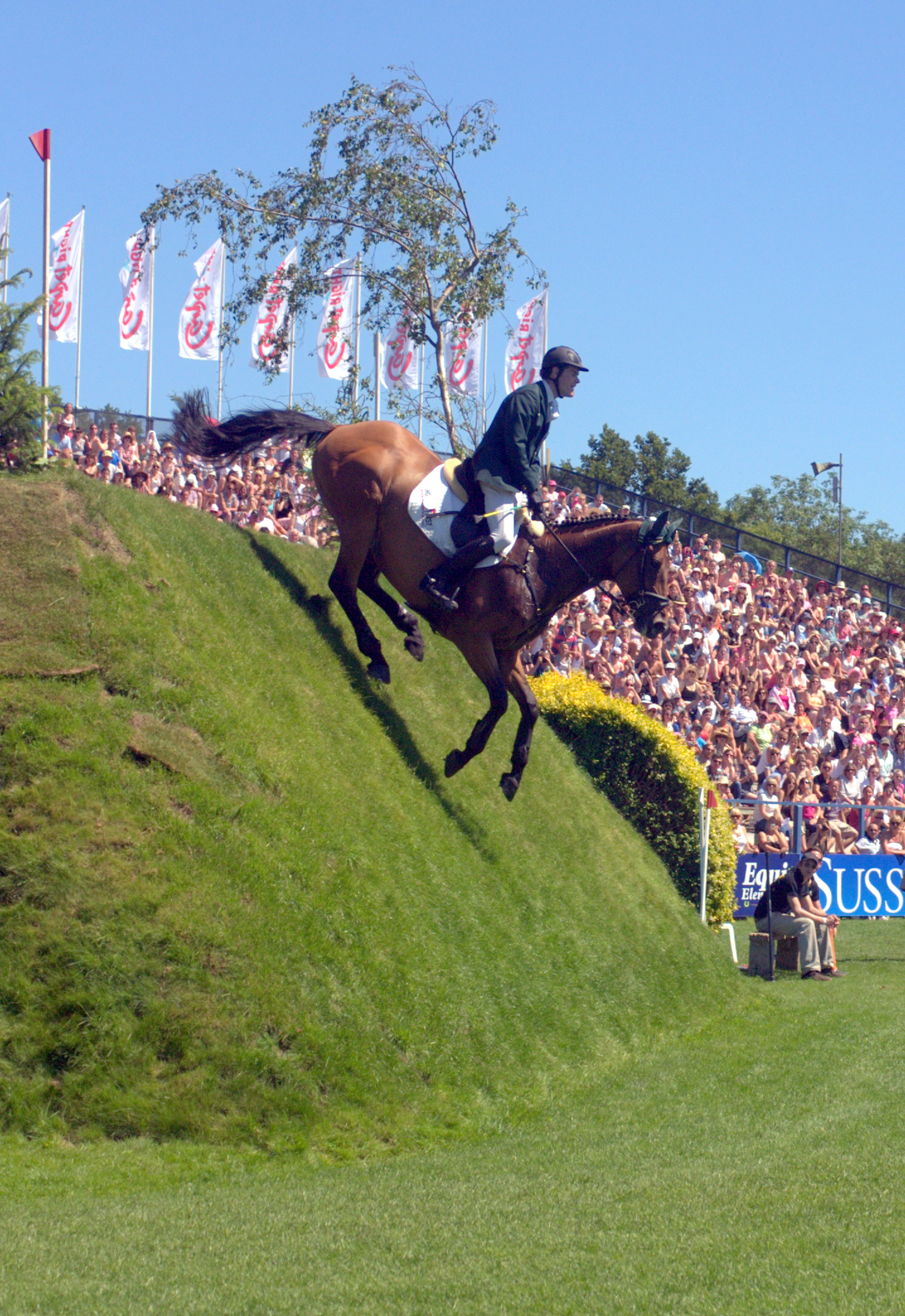
The Hickstead Derby bank in 2011

The Hickstead Derby Bank The Derby Bank, also known as the Derby Bank, is a well-known jump at the All England Jumping Course at Hickstead that is part of the course for the British Jumping Derby. The jump consists of 3 ft 5 in (1.04 m) rails on top, the smallest on the course, followed by 16 ft (4.9 m) horizontal flat before a 10 ft 6 in (3.20 m) slope down the front, followed by 2 strides and a rail jump. It is the highest competition bank in the world.

The All England Jumping Course first opened in 1960, with the Derby bank added a year later in 1961. Douglas Bunn, founder of Hickstead, had seen film footage of the Hamburg Derby and decided to visit the German showground to measure its bank and replicate it. He wanted the Derby to be the ultimate test for horse and rider. Bunn arrived on New Year's Eve when it was snowing and went around the showground measuring fences, much to the bemusement of the show's officials. It is thought that the layer of snow on top of the Hamburg bank might have affected Douglas's measurements, or he chose to improve upon his German counterparts, as Hickstead's bank stands 6–18 in (150–460 mm) taller than the German original, making it the highest competition bank in the world.

The original bank was predominately built of chalk with a layer of clay encasing it. Many of the riders in the first Hickstead Derby refused to jump the obstacle, fearing it was too dangerous and posed a risk to their horses. Ireland's Seamus Hayes became the first rider to win the Hickstead Derby after successfully negotiating the bank on his horse, Goodbye III. The internal structure was changed to concrete in 1969 and first used in competition in 1970. This was deemed safer and reduced slipping during the descent. In 1972, Chamusca Lad, ridden by Ann Backhouse, was euthanized after being fatally injured while falling from the Derby Bank.

In 2004, GG Barock was euthanized after breaking a leg while landing at the bottom of the Derby Bank. During the same event, another horse, Sublime, fell at the bottom of the bank, unseating rider Mark Bunting.

Work was completed in 2005 to lessen the angle of the bank's face from 52 degrees to 60 degrees. At the time, Bunn said the "changes have been made simply because less horses are educated in the hunting field, where this type of obstacle is met". Despite the changes, there is still an average of only one clear round per year at the Hickstead Derby.
