= British Showjumping Association =

- VAT ID no.: 210797
- Website: www.britishshowjumping.co.uk

British Showjumping is the Great Britain governing body for the equestrian sport of showjumping. It provides the competitors for Team GBR in international competition and sets the rules under which affiliated competitions are held. It is one of the 16 organisations which form part of the British Equestrian Federation.

In 2013, the former Olympic bronze medallist David Broome was appointed BSJA president.
