= Big Star (horse) =

Show jumping horse

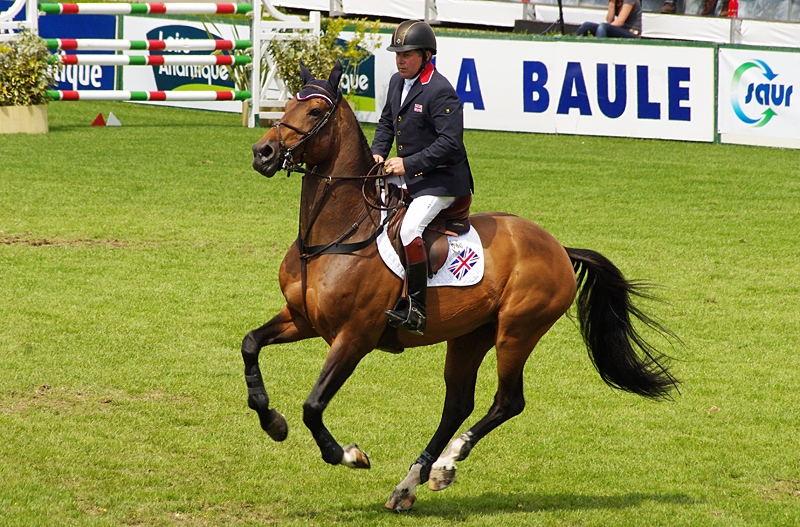
- Breed: Dutch Warmblood
- Sire: Quick Star
- Grandsire: Nimmerdor
- Sex: Stallion
- Foaled: 1 June 2003 (age 23); Schoorl, Netherlands
- Color: Bay
- Trainer: Nick Skelton

Major wins
- Hamburg Grand Prix in 2012; Team gold in 2012 London Olympics; Individual gold in 2016 Rio de Janeiro Olympics

Honors
- KWPN Horse of the Year in 2012

Olympic medal record

Equestrian
Gold medal – first place	2012 London	Team jumping
Gold medal – first place	2016 Rio de Janeiro	Individual jumping

Big Star (foaled 1 June 2003) is a Dutch Warmblood stallion who competes in show jumping with the British rider Nick Skelton. Part of the gold medal team at the London Olympics, Big Star was elected the KWPN horse of the year and formed a partnership with Skelton in 2012. After good performances in the following year, he was temporarily taken out of competition because of a leg injury. Skelton has described the bay stallion, son of Quick Star and grandson of Nimmerdor as "the best horse he has ever ridden". Apart from his show-jumping, Big Star is a successful breeding stallion, licensed in 21 studbooks for sport horses. Some of his foals have won notable victories.

== Background ==
Big Star, foaled on 1 June 2003, is a bay stallion with three white socks bred in the Netherlands by Cees T. Klaver. Sources have described him as standing either 1.72 metres or 1.67 metres. He is a son of the stallion Quick Star and is registered in the KWPN studbook.

A Dutch horse dealer, Egbert Schep, acquired Big Star at the age of three years and sold the horse to the sponsors of Nick Skelton, Gary and Beverley Widdowson. The Widdowsons have been friends and supporters of Skelton for years.

== Show-jumping career ==
The stallion began his career at the highest level in 2010, at the age of 7 years. The following year, he won several Grand Prix competitions in Wellington. Big Star then won the Hamburg Grand Prix in May 2012.

Big Star was part of the British team that won the gold medal at the London Olympics in 2012, but he failed in individual jumping because of a dropped rail. He was the youngest horse in this competition. Greeted along the route by "a delirious crowd", Nick Skelton and Big Star finished in 5th place in individual. They were elected best horse-rider pair of the Year by the International Equestrian Federation. Big Star was also named KWPN Horse of the Year in 2012.

In 2013, the stallion won the Nations Cup in Dublin team, the Grand Prix of Rome, and CSIO5 * of Aachen, considered the most prestigious courses of the circuit Grand Prix. Mid August 2013, Big Star injured a leg (presumably, a splint) at the Dublin Nations Cup. The wound swelled, so Nick Skelton withdrew the other competitions of the season. After a recovery period in Florida during the winter 2013–2014, Big Star was considered cured in May 2014. Nick Skelton competed in the 2014 FEI World Equestrian Games, but in July, Big Star suffered another leg injury. In October 2015, Big Star reappeared in more modest level competitions, including Vilamoura in Portugal and in Wellington, after a period of jumping at home for three months.

Big Star was back in Florida in January 2016, but his return was not immediately conclusive, since he ended at 4 points (77) on a course of a 40-meter Winter Equestrian Festival in Wellington. He found his highest level on the CSIO La Baule in May 2016, ending two courses without penalty. Nick Skelton however withdrew before the finals, for the sake of preserving his horse before the Rio Olympic Games.

In the 2016 Rio de Janeiro Olympic Games, Skelton and Big Star took the gold medal in individual jumping.

== Assessment ==
Nick Skelton believes that Big Star is the best horse he has ever ridden, thanks to the power of his action, his expansion, and his beating temperament. Interviewed shortly after the victory of the British Show Jumping Team for the 2012 Olympics, Skelton said his horse is "a monster" and further described Big Star as an "amazing" horse.

== Stud record ==
Big Star is a sought after stallion, approved in 21 studbooks. After being approved in the studbooks of Belgium and the Netherlands in 2008, he was recognised in the French Selle Français studbook in 2015. According to the ranking of the WBFSH 2013, he is the best son of Quick Star, with 1483 points (ahead the second Orient Express * HDC, who only collected 740 points). He is deemed particularly fertile.

Guillaume Canet cites Big Star among horses that have marked and are part of its references.

Two of his foals are notable. E-Star was selected in KWPN performance tests in 2011, and Big Star Jr. was approved by the Zangersheide studbook the same year.

== Pedigree ==
Pedigree of Big Star, bay stallion, 2003
Sire Quick Star (SF) 1982	Galoubet A (SF); 1972	Almé Z (SF)	Ibrahim (SF)
Sire Quick Star (SF) 1982	Galoubet A (SF); 1972	Almé Z (SF)	Girondine (SF)
Sire Quick Star (SF) 1982	Galoubet A (SF); 1972	Viti (Trotter)	Nystag (Trotter)
Sire Quick Star (SF) 1982	Galoubet A (SF); 1972	Viti (Trotter)	Ida de Bourgoin (Trotter)
Sire Quick Star (SF) 1982	Stella (SF); 1989	Nithard (A-A)	Kesbeth (A-A)
Sire Quick Star (SF) 1982	Stella (SF); 1989	Nithard (A-A)	Nitouche (A-A)
Sire Quick Star (SF) 1982	Stella (SF); 1989	Flora (SF)	Tripoli (A-A)
Sire Quick Star (SF) 1982	Stella (SF); 1989	Flora (SF)	Vanille (SF)
Dam Jolanda (KWPN) 1991	Nimmerdor (KWPN); 1972	Farn (Holsteiner)	Fax I (Holsteiner)
Dam Jolanda (KWPN) 1991	Nimmerdor (KWPN); 1972	Farn (Holsteiner)	Dorette (Holsteiner)
Dam Jolanda (KWPN) 1991	Nimmerdor (KWPN); 1972	Ramonaa (KWPN)	Koridon (TB)
Dam Jolanda (KWPN) 1991	Nimmerdor (KWPN); 1972	Ramonaa (KWPN)	Friedhilde II (KWPN)
Dam Jolanda (KWPN) 1991	Elysette (KWPN); 1986	Ramiro Z (Holsteiner)	Raimond (Holsteiner)
Dam Jolanda (KWPN) 1991	Elysette (KWPN); 1986	Ramiro Z (Holsteiner)	Valine H (Holsteiner)
Dam Jolanda (KWPN) 1991	Elysette (KWPN); 1986	Paerel (KWPN)	Erdball (TB)
Dam Jolanda (KWPN) 1991	Elysette (KWPN); 1986	Paerel (KWPN)	Ykje (Groningen)
