= Liz Edgar =

British showjumper (1943–2020)

Elizabeth McPherson Edgar (née Broome; 28 April 1943 – 25 April 2020) was a British international showjumper and board director of British Showjumping.

== Family ==
She was the younger sister of David Broome and was originally from Monmouthshire. Her father was a keen showjumper.

== Competitive career ==
She first competed in the Horse of the Year Show at the age of twelve, at the age of seventeen she won the Young Rider Championships and won them again the following year. She won the Queen Elizabeth Cup five times, a record that still stood at the time of her death. She was the first woman to win the Aachen Grand Prix in 1980.

She had great success with the chestnut Everest Forever with whom she won three of her Queen Elizabeth cups, the Aachen Grand Prix, the 1981 European Championships in Munich and riding on the Nations Cup team in the Dublin Horse Show in 1985.

== Personal life ==
She married the international showjumper Ted Edgar in 1965 and they bred horses at Rio Grande farm in Leek Wootton. Six years after their marriage they had a daughter Marie.

Liz and Ted ran the Rio Grande business together until his death in late 2018. She continued running the business with daughter Marie.

== Death ==
She died on 25 April 2020, aged 76, after a short struggle with cancer. Her brother David paid tribute to her saying she had worked hard to achieve what she had whereas he had merely been lucky.
