= David Broome =

Welsh equestrian (born 1940)

David Broome CBE
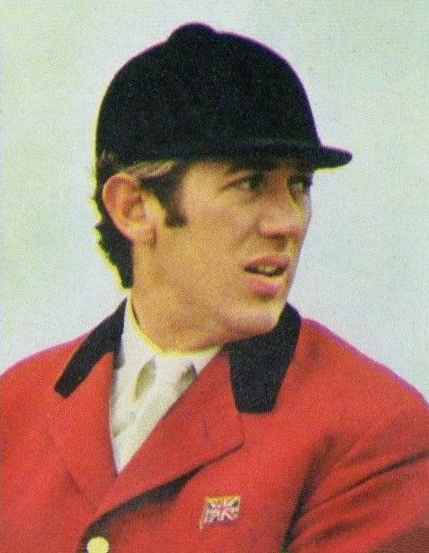
- Broome c. 1974

Personal information
- Born: 1 March 1940 (age 86) Cardiff, Wales
- Height: 181 cm (5 ft 11 in)
- Weight: 76 kg (12 st 0 lb)

Sport
- Sport: Equestrianism
- Event: Show jumping
Medal record
Representing Great Britain
Olympic Games
Bronze medal – third place	1960 Rome	Individual jumping
Bronze medal – third place	1968 Mexico	Individual jumping
World Championships
Gold medal – first place	1970 La Baule	Individual jumping
Gold medal – first place	1978 Aachen	Team jumping
Bronze medal – third place	1960 Venice	Individual jumping
Bronze medal – third place	1982 Dublin	Team jumping
Bronze medal – third place	1990 Stockholm	Team jumping
European Championships
Gold medal – first place	1961 Aachen	Individual jumping
Gold medal – first place	1967 Rotterdam	Individual jumping
Gold medal – first place	1969 Hickstead	Individual jumping
Gold medal – first place	1979 Rotterdam	Team jumping
Silver medal – second place	1977 Vienna	Team jumping
Silver medal – second place	1983 Hickstead	Team jumping
Silver medal – second place	1991 La Baule	Team jumping

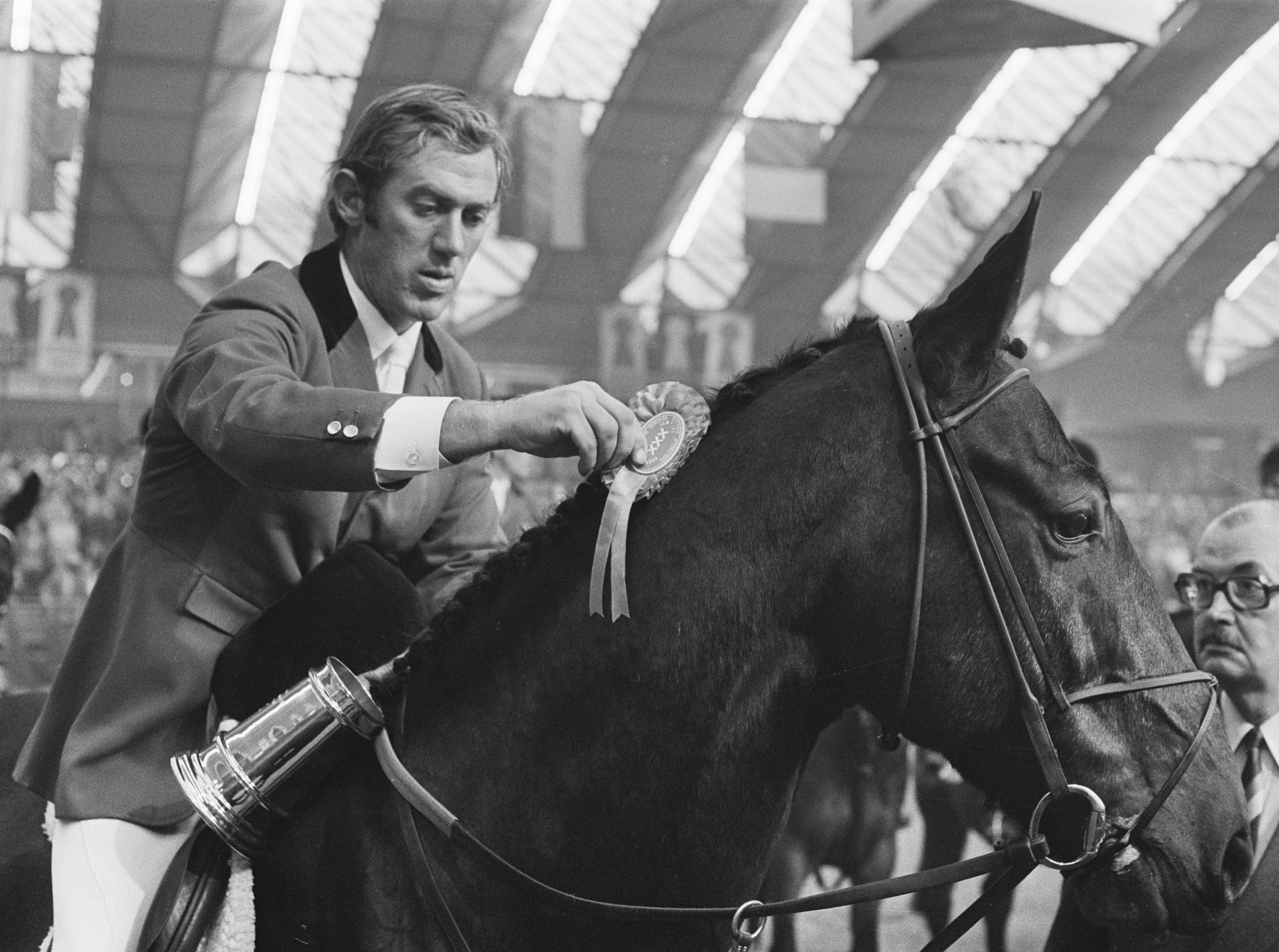
Broome on Sportsman in 1975

David McPherson Broome CBE (born 1 March 1940) is a retired Welsh show jumping champion. He competed in the 1960, 1964, 1968, 1972 and 1988 Olympics and won individual bronze medals in 1960 on Sunsalve and in 1968 on his best-known horse Mr Softee. In 1960, he was also voted BBC Sports Personality of the Year, and at the 1972 Games served as the Olympic flag bearer for Great Britain.

Broome was born in Cardiff, attended Monmouth School, and still maintains his stables at Mount Ballan Manor, Crick, near Chepstow in Monmouthshire. He held the individual European title in 1961, 1967 and 1969. In 1970, he won the world title and became Western Mail Welsh Sports Personality of the year. He turned professional in 1973, and in 1978 helped the British team to win the world championship. Broome has won the King George V Gold Cup a record six times on six different horses between 1960 and 1991, a record yet to be equalled. He has enjoyed most of his success on Irish Sport Horses and he has said his favourite horse of all was Sportsman. Broome's sister, Liz Edgar, was also a top-class showjumper.

Broome is still active in the administration of the sport. In 2013, he became president of the British Showjumping Association.

Broome was appointed an Officer of the Order of the British Empire (OBE) in the 1970 Birthday Honours, and promoted to Commander of the same order (CBE) in the 1995 Birthday Honours, on both occasions for services to showjumping.

== Major achievements ==
- Olympic Games
  - 1960 Rome: Individual Bronze medal on Sunsalve
  - 1968 Mexico: Individual Bronze medal on Mister Softee
  - 1988 Seoul: Equal 4th place on Countryman
- World championships
  - 1960 Venice: Individual Bronze medal on Sunsalve
  - 1970 La Baule: Individual Gold medal on Beethoven
  - 1978 Aachen: Team Gold medal on Philco
  - 1982 Dublin: Team Bronze medal on Mr Ross
  - 1990 Stockholm: Team Bronze medal on Lannegan
- European championships
  - 1961 Aachen: Individual Gold medal on Sunsalve
  - 1967 Rotterdam: Individual Gold medal on Mister Softee
  - 1969 Hickstead: Individual Gold medal on Mister Softee
  - 1977 Vienna: Team Silver medal on Philco
  - 1979 Rotterdam: Team Gold medal on Queensway Big Q
  - 1983 Hickstead: Team Silver medal on Mr Ross
  - 1991 La Baule: Team Silver medal on Lannegan
- FEI World Cup
  - World Cup Jumping League Winner 1979/80 with Queensway Big Q and Sportsman
- World Cup qualifier wins
  - 1978/1979 's-Hertogenbosch on Philco
  - 1979/1980 Birmingham on Sportsman
  - 1979/1980 Wien on Philco
  - 1979/1980 Bordeaux on Queensway Big Q
  - 1979/1980 Amsterdam on Sportsman
  - 1980/1981 Olympia (London) on Philco
  - 1981/1982 London (Olympia) on Philco
  - 1981/1982 Dublin on Mr Ross
  - 1983/1984 Amsterdam on Last Resort
- 1966 Hickstead Derby winner on Mister Softee
- King George V Gold Cup
  - 1960 on Sunsalve
  - 1966 on Mister Softee
  - 1972 on Sportsman
  - 1977 on Philco
  - 1981 on Mr Ross
  - 1991 on Lannegan
- International Grand Prix wins include:
  - 1960 Dublin on Sunsalve
  - 1967 Dublin on Mr Softee
  - 1968 Dublin on Mr Softee
  - 1970 La Baule on Beethoven
  - 1973 St.Gallen on Manhattan
  - 1975 Olympia (London) on Philco
  - 1977 Dublin on Philco
  - 1979 Amsterdam on Sportsman
  - 1979 Dublin on Sportsman
  - 1981 Olympia (London) on Philco
  - 1980 Olympia (London) on Philco
  - 1983 Amsterdam on Last Resort
  - 1981 Dublin on Queensway Big Q
  - 1981 Spruce Meadows on Queensway Philco
  - 1981 Horse of the Year Show (Wembley Arena) on Mr Ross
