= British Horse Society =

British charitable organization

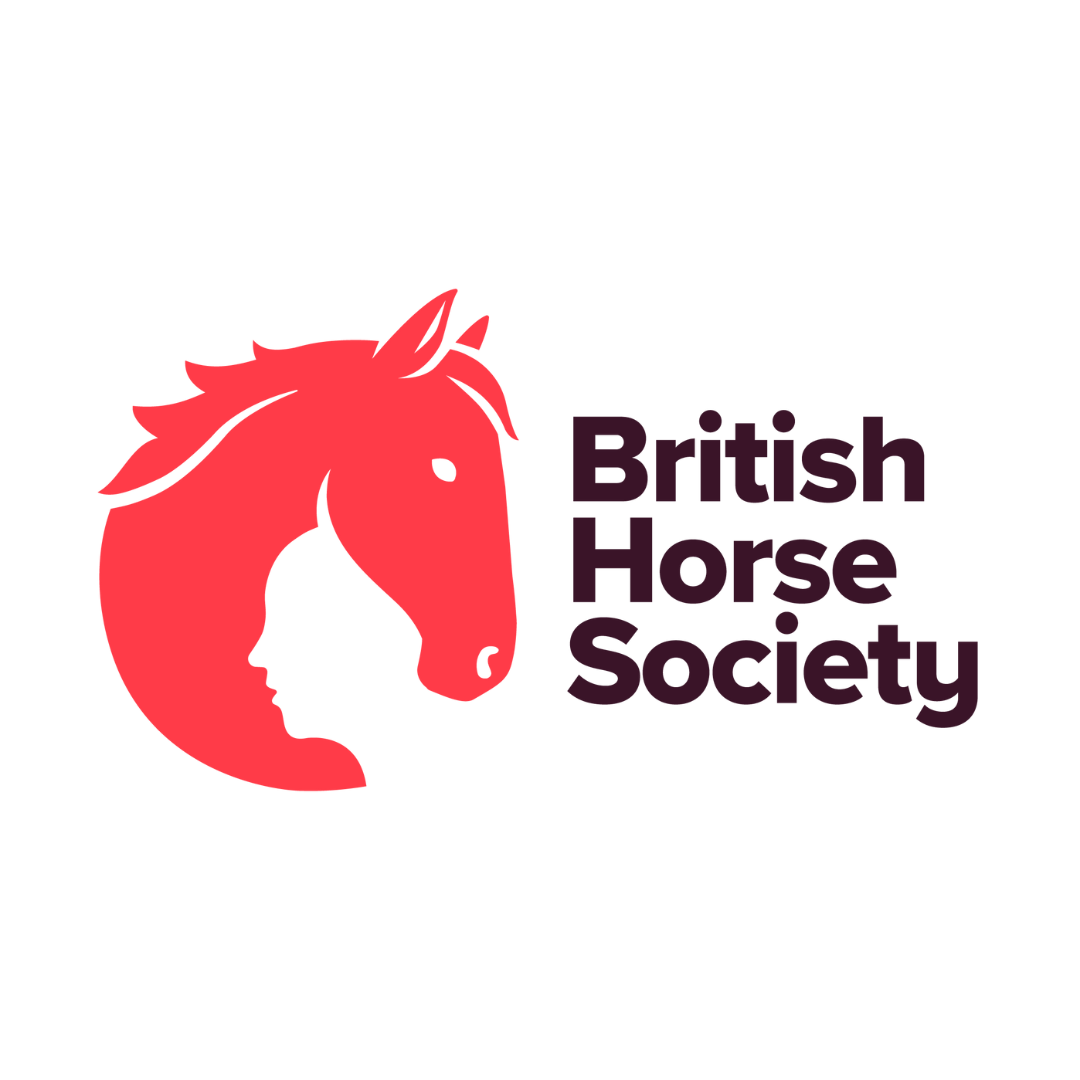
- Abbreviation: BHS
- Founded: 5 November 1947
- Type: Charitable organisation
- Registration no.: England and Wales: 210504 Scotland: SC038516
- Purpose: Equine
- Location: Abbey Park, Stareton, Kenilworth, Warwickshire, CV8 2XZ
- Coordinates: 52.343048°N 1.499186°W
- Region served: United Kingdom
- Members: Over 110,000
- Key people: James Hick (CEO), Martin Clunes (President)
- Publication: British Horse magazine
- Employees: 87 (average full-time equivalent) (2018)
- Website: www.bhs.org.uk

British Horse Society (BHS) is a membership-based equine charity, with a stated vision of "a Society which provides a strong voice for horses and people and which spreads awareness through support, training and education". It currently has more than 110,000 members, with a further 34,000 members affiliated through a British Riding Club, making it the largest equine membership organisation in the United Kingdom. It is one of the 19 organisations which form part of the British Equestrian Federation.

== History ==
BHS was founded in 1947 in the amalgamation of two organisations – the Institute of the Horse and Pony Club, and the National Horse Association of Great Britain. Mary Colvin was its first president.

=== Aims ===
The primary objectives of the BHS are:

- To promote and advance the education, training and safety of the public in all matters relating to the horse
- To promote the use, breeding, well-being, safety, environment, health and management of the horse for the public benefit
- To promote community participation in healthy recreation involving the horse
- To promote and facilitate the prevention of cruelty, neglect or harm to horses and to promote the relief, safety, sanctuary, rescue and welfare of horses in need of care, attention and assistance
- To promote and secure the provision, protection and preservation of rights of way and of access for riding and driving horses over public roads, highways, footpaths, bridleways, carriageways, public paths and other land.

=== British Riding Clubs ===
The British Riding Clubs (BRC) movement became affiliated to British Horse Society over fifty years ago, when several riding clubs from the South East England area approached the BHS with the idea of providing a scheme where riding clubs could become affiliated to the BHS, while remaining relatively autonomous, running their own affairs. Since then, the numbers have grown considerably, with more than 440 affiliated clubs, over 50 affiliated riding centres, and over 34,000 members, each coming within one of 23 administrative areas. Each riding club's membership is open to everyone, from leisure riders to competitors.

The aims of BRC are to help people ride, compete and train together at national competitions, training and social events. BRC areas organise a wide range of competitive, social and educational activities for their members, with championships held at some of Britain's most prestigious events, such as the Royal Windsor Horse Show, the Royal International Horse Show, and the London International Horse Show (Olympia).

== Governance ==
The president of the society is Martin Clunes. The patron of the society was Queen Elizabeth II and the vice patron is Princess Anne.

== Activities ==
=== Qualifications, training and education ===
BHS has an extensive and world-standard system of qualifications, training and education, including the Horse Owner's Certificates which are aimed at the leisure rider, and the Stages exams which lead to various riding instructor's and groom's qualifications.

The BHS also maintains a Register of Accredited Professional Coaches in the UK and around the world.

=== Access and Rights of Way ===
BHS Access and Rights of Way department works to improve the bridleways network throughout England, Scotland and Wales. It has created the 'National Bridleroute Network' of long distance equestrian routes, incorporating bridleways, byways and minor roads, which it has called 'bridleroutes'. This work is supported by a network of national committees and regional groups. The BHS is consulted about proposed legislation, government planning guidance, Definitive Maps and road schemes, and has influenced and continues to influence legislation.

BHS were among a group of organisations against a decision by the BMW car company to reassign the use of BMW property in Oxfordshire, resulting in closure of an existing bridleway with no alternative offered. The BHS challenged this decision by BMW in court and subsequently lost and were ordered to repay legal costs to BMW. Some questioned BHS management's application of limited financial resources to the cause. The good intent of the BHS was recognised by many, as the continued loss of bridleways across the country has eroded the freedom of those participating in horseriding activities. A protest against the court's decision, supported by a local councillor, was unsuccessful.

=== Safety ===
BHS Safety Department promotes the ongoing improvement of horse and rider safety. This includes campaigning for recognition and safe conditions for riders on Britain's roads.

Education of motorists and riders is a high priority. The Riding and Road Safety test is taken by more than 4,000 candidates every year. This helps to educate riders in road safety and to minimise the risks involved when riding on the road.

The society runs a website dedicated to safety advice and reporting safety incidents, www.horseaccidents.org.uk. The data collected is used to lobby for better conditions for equestrians. In the site's first two years, the BHS saw a 250% increase in road accidents reported to them, and incidents involving dog attacks helped influence changes to the Dangerous Dogs Bill.

=== Welfare ===
BHS Welfare team aims to prevent cases of cruelty and neglect through education. This is achieved through its network of welfare volunteers, advisory literature, and a dedicated team at the society's headquarters. The experience of BHS Welfare volunteers is intended to allow the society to respond quickly in an informed manner to reports of equine suffering and neglect, giving advice and guidance to horse owners on a long-term basis where necessary.

As well as responding to welfare concerns, the department lobbies government on a number of welfare-related issues; runs campaigns including the Ragwort Awareness Campaign; promotes responsible breeding through its 'Think Before You Breed' campaign and close link with the BHS Horse and Pony Breeds Committee; works closely with other welfare organisations and monitors the horses and ponies on the BHS's rehoming scheme.

To help fund its work, BHS Welfare organises and runs Challenge Rides to Peru, Jordan, Iceland, Bulgaria, Iceland, India, Lesotho, Mongolia, Morocco, Spain and Inner Mongolia.

== Successes ==
=== Dead Slow ===
In March 2016, BHS launched its Dead Slow campaign, to encourage drivers to slow down to 15 mph and pass widely when they meet horses on the road.

The campaign earned national coverage on BBC TV and radio, featured on petrol pumps across the UK and was raised as an Early Day Motion in Parliament by Liz Saville-Roberts MP.

== Controversy ==
=== Ministry of Defence ===
BHS caused controversy in November 2006, by issuing an award to the Ministry of Defence for actions taken to improve the safety for horse riders in areas of the country used for low flight level aircraft training, despite the M.O.D. having been previously found directly responsible for the death of a novice horse rider and ordered to address their low flying policies as a result.

Some felt the award was ethically improper; particularly so, since the BHS had used the name of the accident victim in promotional material without the consent of the family members.

=== Noel Edmonds ===
In June 2006, the then president of the BHS, celebrity Noel Edmonds, severely criticised the BHS for failing to fulfill its fundamental aims; that of recruitment of the existing horse riding community to the organisation and positive promotion of the activity to potential new participants. The chairman of the BHS, Patrick Print, attempted to mitigate Edmonds's statements by quoting some recent activities the BHS had participated in. Edmonds resigned from his position at the BHS a few months later.

=== Rollkur ===
In 2007, an issue of a BHS publication carried an article on the controversial rollkur procedure (otherwise known as LDR or Hyperflection) debate. The BHS received letters of complaint from its membership and some individuals called for the resignation of the senior management of the BHS for bringing the organisation's name into disrepute. The response of the then chairman, Patrick Print, to a letter from one member was deemed dismissive and confrontational by some members. The BHS has since published a policy based on the procedure being 'an unacceptable method of training horses by any rider for any length of time'.

=== Claypits - Staple Bridleway ===
BHS has been caught in a controversy with Kent locals due to BHS's pressure on the Kent County Council (KCC) to convert a small footpath into a bridleway. The locals have objected to this decision for the following reasons:

- The 3m bridleway width stipulation challenges listed buildings: the route proposed by the BHS travels between Claypits House (1685) and the Claypits Farm Cottage (1840), both grade II listed. The current public footpath is approximately 2.1m wide resulting in the bridleway plans requiring 0.9m of private property to be removed.
- The existence of a bridleway which runs parallel to the proposed pathway from Goodnestone up to Crixhall.
- 'Pudding' and 'Disaster' has been a nickname for the pathway for decades due to the intense soil instability in the area. The clay soil along the path towards 'Clay'-pits becomes extremely sticky and saturated - this will cause issues for the Horses which will attempt to cross the path. The horse hoof's impression on the soil will create a dangerous and unstable route for pedestrians during high rainfall periods.
  - British Horse Society PDF for 'Advice on Surfaces for Horses in England and Wales' states how 'Where the soil type is clay... then artificial surfacing may be required for the route to remain passable for all users'. The PDF guide produced by BHS further notes how 'Clay soils are particularly prone to damage by horses. Well-used paths on such soils soon become a sticky mess impassable to walkers, cyclists or riders'. The BHS realises the difficulty of bridleways along clay soils and yet, they still persist to form the bridleway.
- The Ordnance Survey maps used for the BHS & KCC decisions contain fundamental flaws with mistakes of several feet along the pathway.
- The current Public footpath is maintained by the landowner and once it becomes a Bridleway, the county council (KCC) will be placed in charge. However, the public rights of way officer for KCC has stated that KCC 'does not have the resources to cut grass, clear trees, etc', therefore it is expected that the route will become overgrown and impassable soon after the conversion to Bridleway.
- The public footpath currently passes through farmland for 1.5 miles with the footpath width no wider than 5 ft. The switch to 'bridleway' will cause the farm to lose valuable land due to the widening of the footpath from 5 ft to 9.10 ft (3m). This will result in lost revenue and decreased crop yield in a time of reduced food security in the UK.
- KCC loss of locals objection letter. Despite acknowledgement of receipt from KCC of the objection letter from Goodnestone Parish Council, KCC did not consider the letter in the decision-making.
- The British Horse Society and KCC based their decision on a map from 1910, failing to acknowledge that the once quiet exit point of the footpath at Claypits is now a hazardous area with cars, vans and tractors driving past. The positioning of The Old Malthouse (Grade II listed) also severely limits the view of oncoming cars to pedestrians. The conversion of the pathway into a bridleway will cause multiple hazards for both the horse riders and the cars at this exit point, with the risk of collision marked as high.

== Headquarters ==
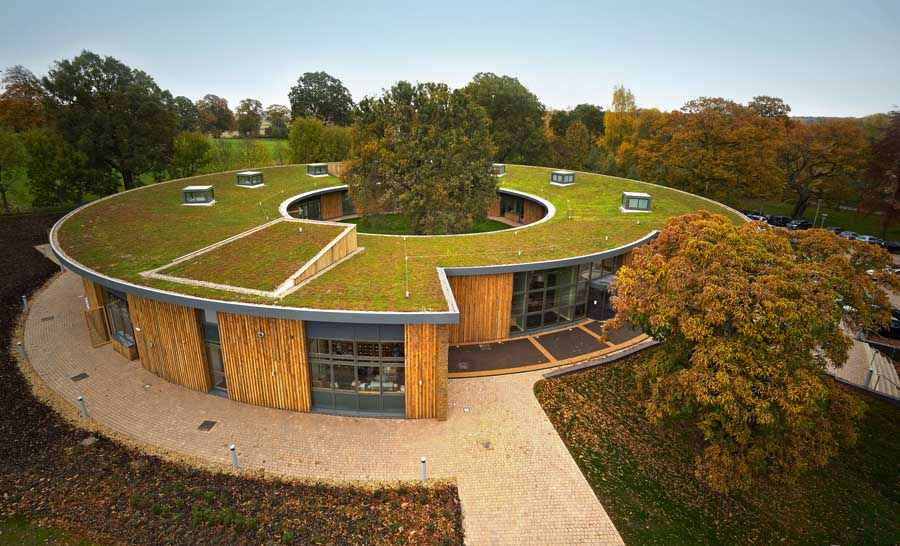
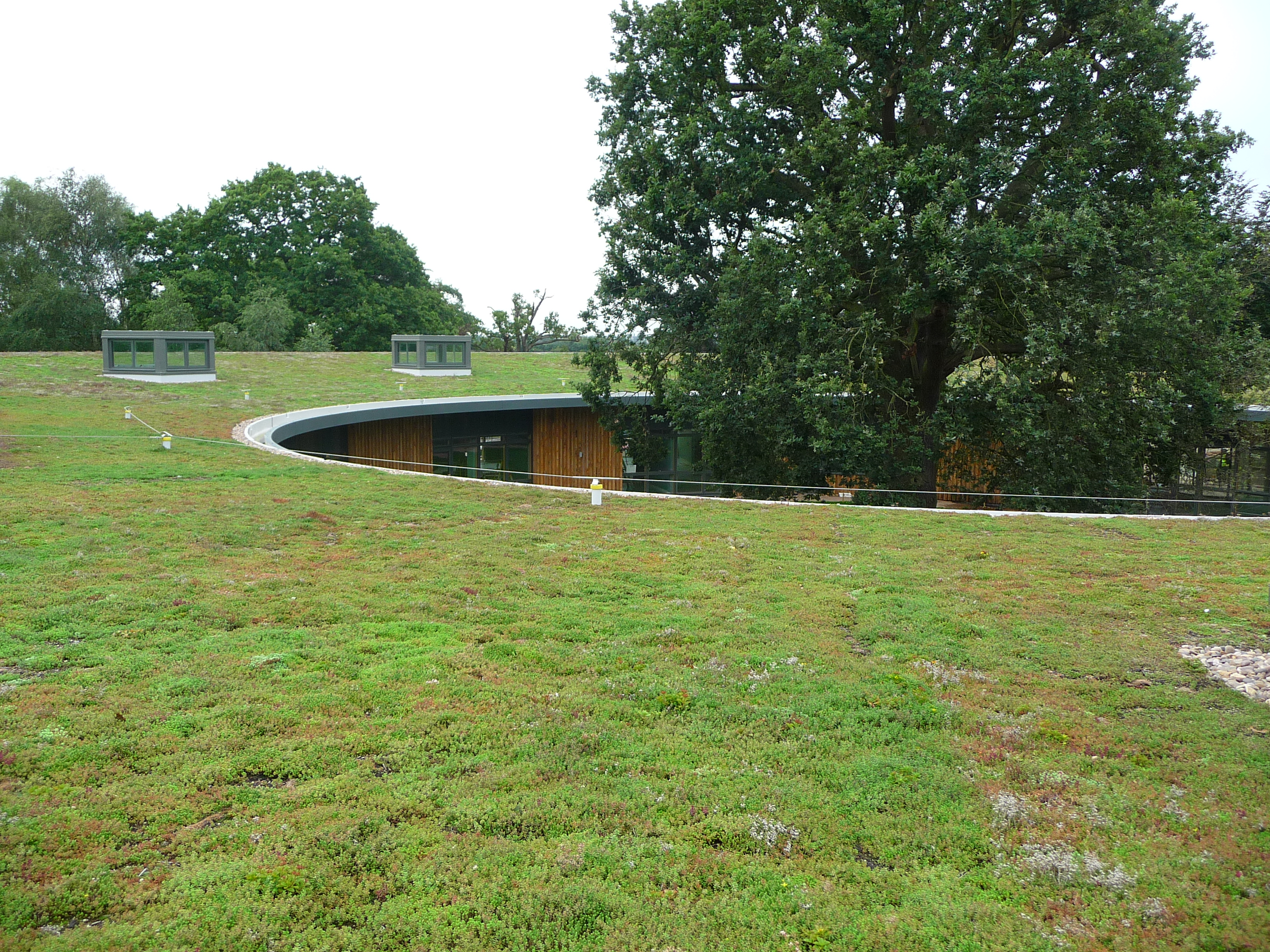
The British Horse Society headquarters circles an ancient oak tree and is topped with a sedum green roof.

In 2010, the outdated premises were replaced with a state of the art eco-friendly HQ which sits within Abbey Park in Warwickshire. The 3.5-acre site offered a great location but came with various planning issues and constraints due to the rural location. The architects had to come up with a solution to have a minimal effect on the green belt land beyond.

The design they came up with was just a single storey, and circled a mature oak tree which had stood on the site for years. Constructed from natural stone, clad with European Oak and topped with a sedum green roof, the aim was to create an ecosystem around the one central oak. The aim for the building was to create a high quality modern building, without compromising the surrounding countryside. To ensure this the materials used were sustainable sourced and the building was designed with this in mind.

The 2200sqm roof took around 3 weeks to install in the summer of 2010. The green roof featured a specialist drainage and filter layer, topped with extensive substrate and a pre grown sedum blanket. The roof provides insulation to the building, helping it stay cool in the hot summer months and warm during the winter. Studies show that a thick layer of vegetation can increase the efficiency of the roof by up to 60%. The rural location meant the green roof helped to reduce the aesthetic impact of the building and blended it into its surroundings.

== Hall of Fame ==
The British Horse Society Equestrian Hall of Fame honours those who have made outstanding contributions to the world of equestrianism.
