= Aga Khan Trophy =

Show jumping prize

The Aga Khan Trophy is the prize presented for Ireland's showjumping Nations Cup competition, held annually at the Dublin Horse Show. The first trophy was donated in 1926 by Aga Khan III, who was a frequent visitor to the show. Initially, a country winning the competition three times would win the trophy outright – which Switzerland achieved with wins in 1926, 1927 and 1930 – but from 1930 it is necessary to win three times in succession. It has been won outright on five occasions, and on each occasion a new trophy was presented by the Aga Khan or his successor, Aga Khan IV. The most recent outright winner was Ireland, who won the trophy in 1977, 1978 and 1979, on the latter two occasions after a jump-off with Great Britain.

The competition is part of the FEI Nations Cup.

== See also ==
- Irish Army Equitation School
