= Royal International Horse Show =

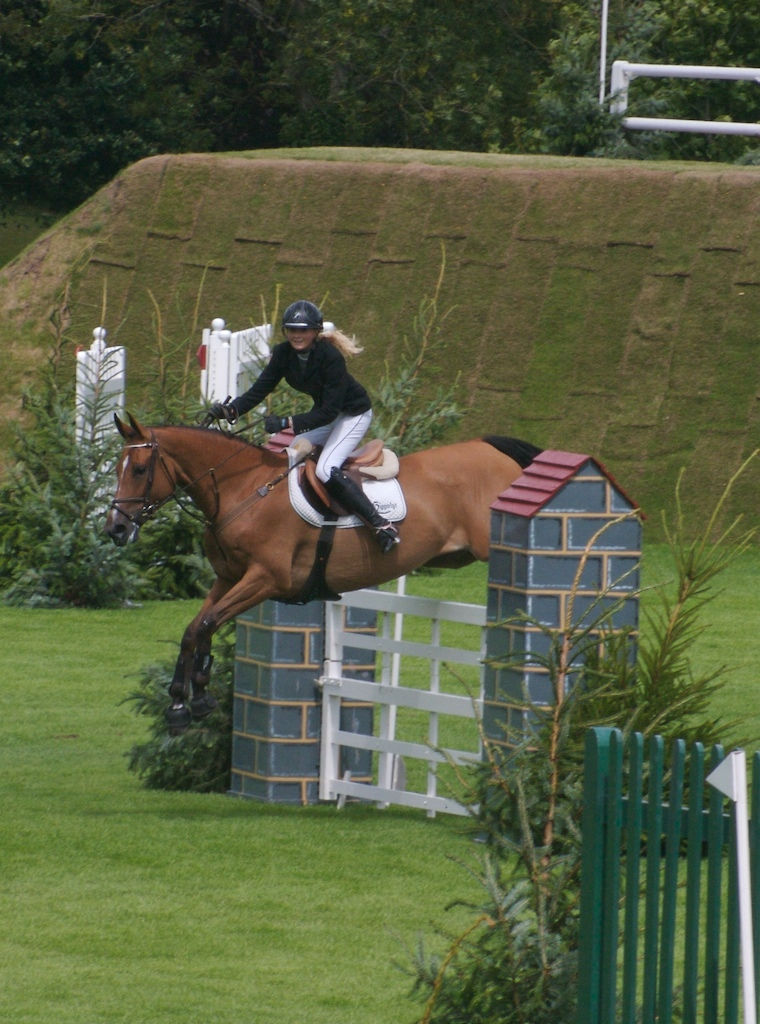
Picture of rider at Hickstead on main jumping course

The Royal International Horse Show (originally the International Horse Show) is the official horse show of the British Horse Society and consists of both showing and showjumping events. The event is held during July each year at the All England Jumping Course at Hickstead. The event is currently title sponsored by Longines, making it the Longines Royal International Horse Show.

The show is the oldest horse show in Britain, having started in 1907.

== History ==
The first Royal International Horse Show was held at London Olympia in 1907, hosted by the Institute of the Horse and Pony Club, which would later become the British Horse Society. It was discontinued during the First World War but revived after it. No show took place in 1933, but a new committee headed by the young 10th Duke of Beaufort re-established the event at Olympia in 1934. Having also been held at Wembley Stadium, White City Stadium in West London and the National Exhibition Centre in Birmingham, the show moved to the All England Jumping Course at Hickstead in 1992.
