= All England Jumping Course at Hickstead =

Show jumping venue in England

Coordinates: 50°57′46″N 0°11′47″W

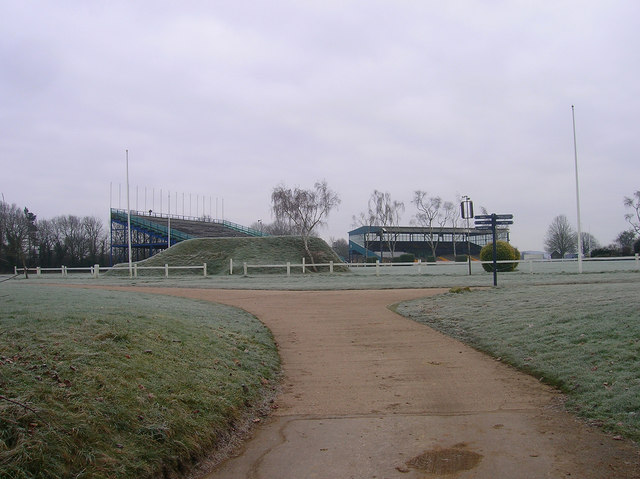
All England Show Jumping Arena created in 1960, pictured 2009.

The All England Jumping Course at Hickstead, widely known as Hickstead, is an equestrian centre in West Sussex, England, principally recognised for its showjumping events. It hosts two international competitions: the Al Shira'aa British Jumping Derby Meeting and the Agria Royal International Horse Show. Opened in 1960, Hickstead was the first permanent showground for equestrian sport in the country. The first Hickstead Derby was held in 1961.

Hickstead is renowned as the home of British showjumping, but its major fixtures also feature other disciplines such as showing, carriage driving, scurry driving, sidesaddle and arena eventing.

Over the years, the venue has expanded its operations to include additional equestrian sports like dressage and arena polo, and it now also hosts functions and conferences all year round.

Hickstead is located adjacent to the hamlet of Twineham, west of Burgess Hill and next to the main A23 road from London to Brighton.

== History ==
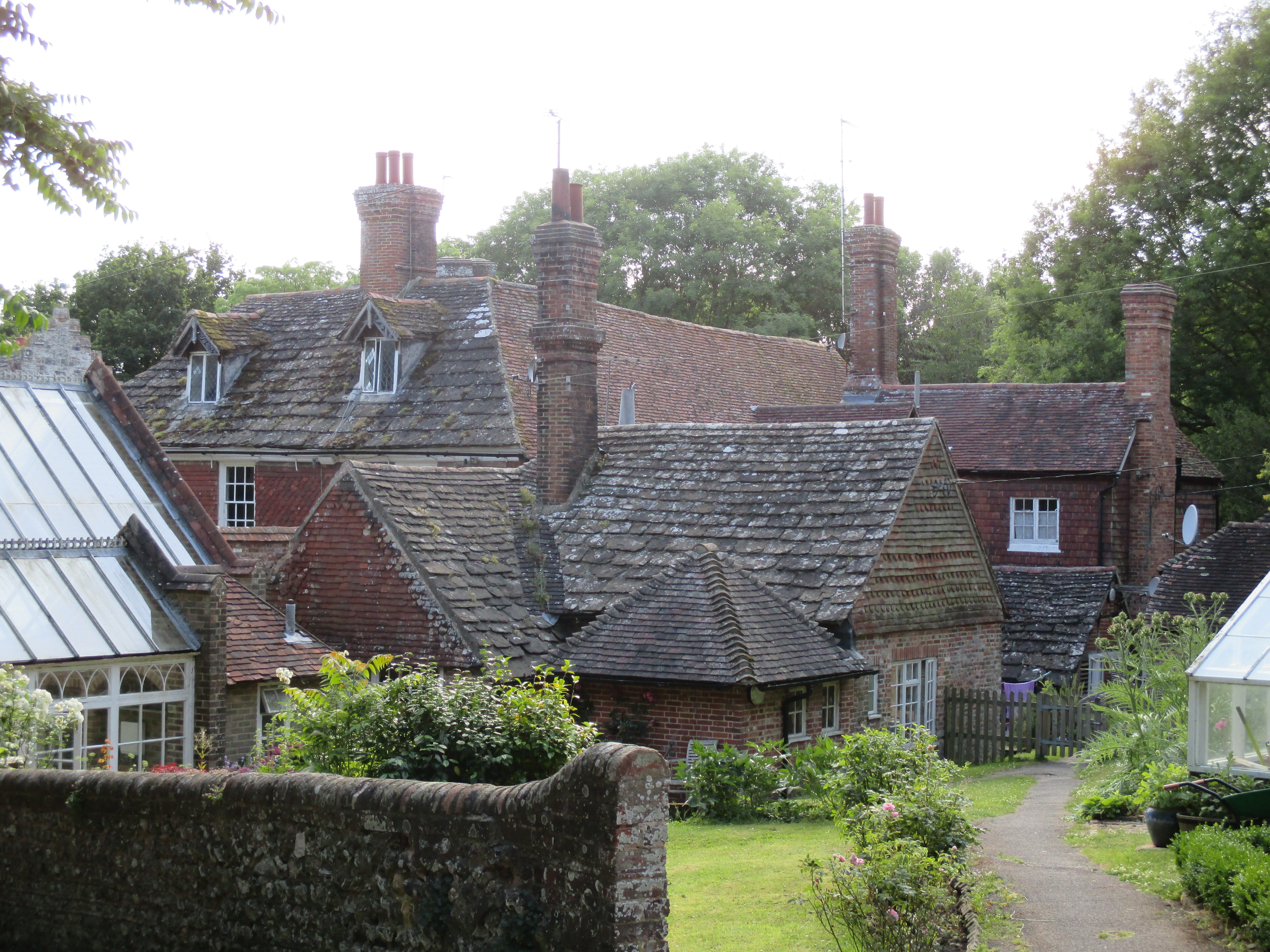
Hickstead Place

The All England Jumping Course was established by Douglas Bunn, a multi-millionaire and former barrister who amassed his wealth by running a caravan business.

Bunn acquired a site known as Hickstead Place with the intention of creating a facility comparable to those in the United States and Europe. The venue opened in 1960.

Today, it features six arenas, permanent seating for over 5,000 spectators and 26 corporate hospitality suites. It has hosted the 1965 Ladies World Championships, the 1974 World Championships and several European Show Jumping Championships.

== British Jumping Derby ==
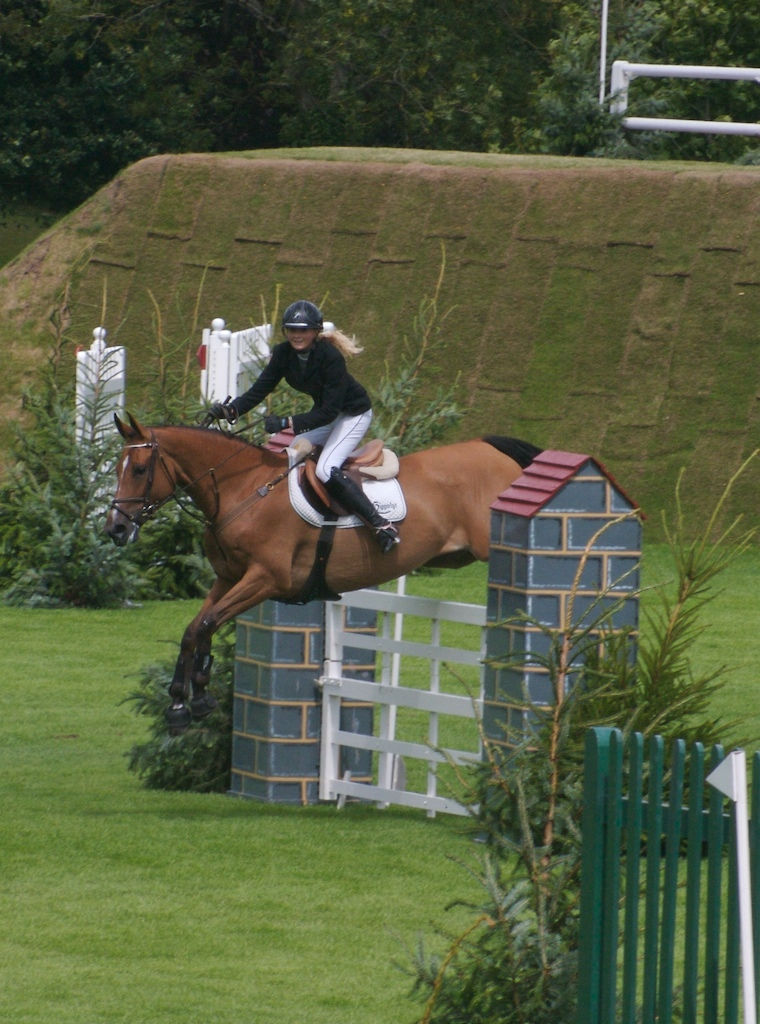
Lola wade jumping the Derby course, with Derby bank in the background

This four-day event attracts around 40,000 spectators a year, who come to watch the skill, bravery and precision of the national and international show jumpers competing for trophies (and substantial prize money).

A highlight of the meeting is the British Jumping Derby, known as the Al Shira'aa Derby, which is a 1,195-metre course with tricky jumps, including the aptly named Devil's Dyke – three fences in short succession with a water-filled ditch in the middle and the difficult Derby Bank, a jump with 3 ft 5 in (1.04 m) rails on top and a 10 ft 6 in (3.20 m) slope down the front.

The British Jumping Derby is one of those events a bit like the Grand National where its not just the runners and riders that make the headlines but the course itself. It's an iconic showjumping contest, the like of which you won't find anywhere else in the world, no other course asks this much of a test of horse and rider and no other course creates this type of drama.

—Clare Balding, BBC Sport

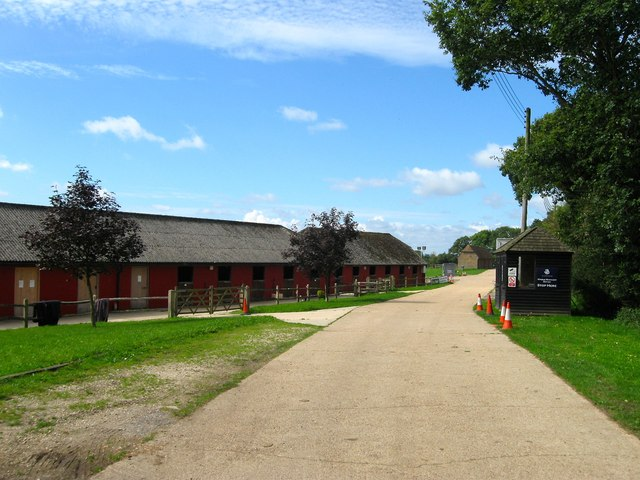
Stable blocks at the Hickstead venue

== Agria Royal International Horse Show ==
The Royal International Horse Show is the official horse show of the British Horse Society and consists of both showing and showjumping events. The event is held during July each year. It is one of only three CHIO 5* events in the world, and home to the Agria Nations Cup of Great Britain and the King George V Gold Cup, also known as the British Grand Prix.

== Other events ==
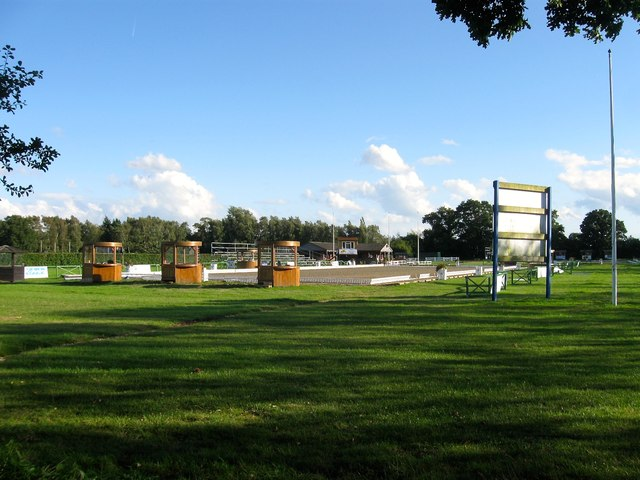
Dressage arena at the Hickstead show grounds

In 1993, the showground saw the establishment of a dressage arena and programme known as Dressage at Hickstead. In 1998, it hosted Junior and Young Rider European Dressage Championships, and in 2003 it welcomed the FEI European Dressage Championships. Although Dressage at Hickstead was officially closed in 2020, the main All England Jumping Course hosted its first British Dressage Premier League show, known as the ICE Horseboxes All England Dressage Festival, in May 2021.

In 2006, the All England Polo Club established. The arena, which is designed for winter polo, measures 100m x 50m and is equipped with an all-weather surface. It is one of the premier Arena Polo venues in the country and has hosted international test matches on several occasions.

Hickstead is also rented out to various show organisers throughout the year, including NSEA competitions, local branches of The Pony Club, British Riding Clubs, and other unaffiliated competitions. Each September, the Sunshine Tour unaffiliated championships take place there.

In 2019, Hickstead introduced a large all-weather cross-country course, which is available for hire from October to May.
