= Four Horsemen of the Apocalypse in popular culture =

Popular depictions of the Four Horsemen of the Apocalypse

The Four Horsemen of the Apocalypse and the derived term Four Horsemen have appeared many times in popular culture.

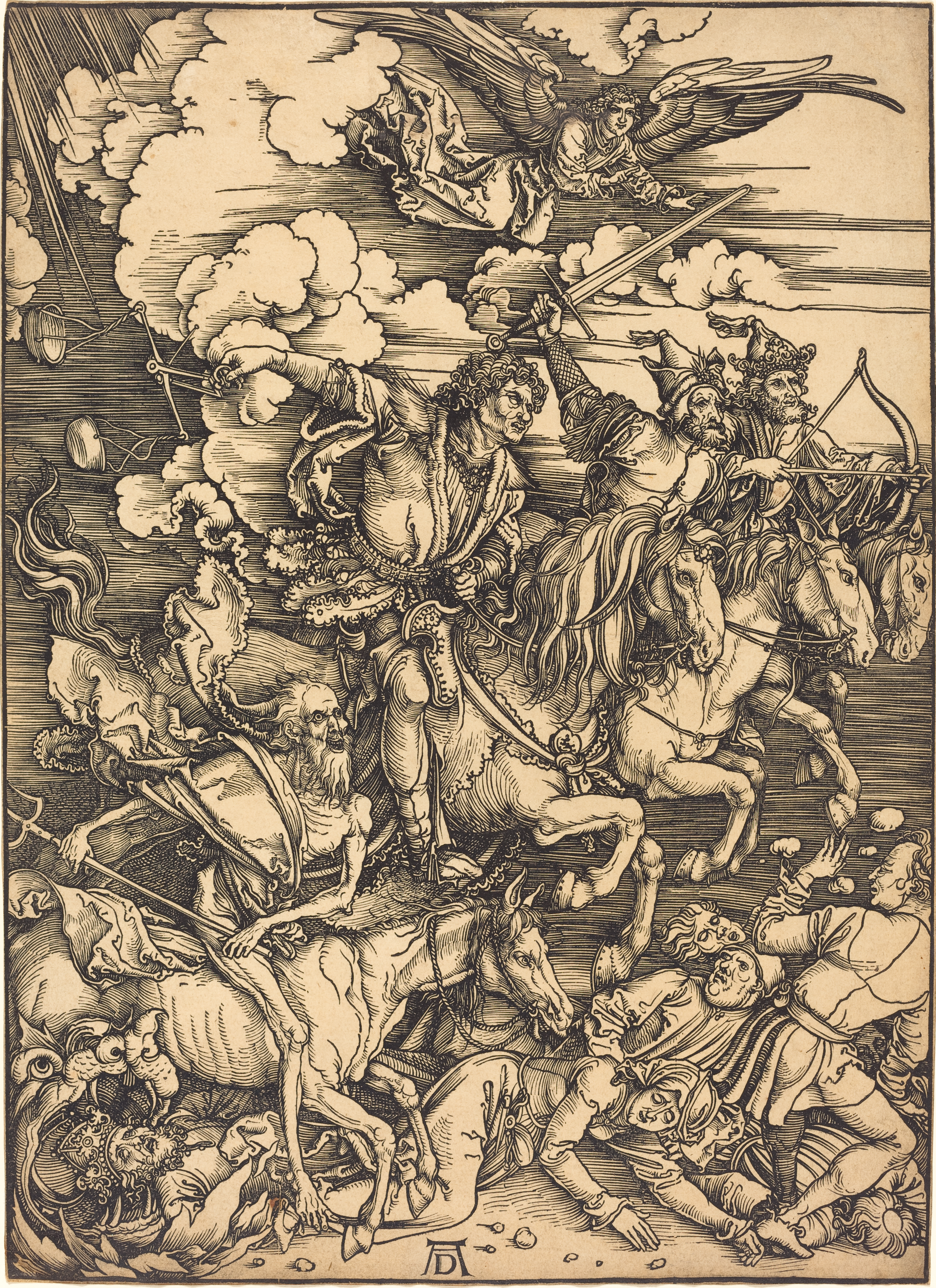
The Horsemen of the Apocalypse, in a woodcut by Albrecht Dürer (c. 1497–98), ride forth as a group, with an angel heralding them, to bring Death, Famine, War, and Conquest unto man.

== In real life ==
- The "Four Horsemen" is a professional wrestling faction that competed in the National Wrestling Alliance and World Championship Wrestling in the 1980s and 1990s. The faction's original incarnation consisted of Ric Flair, Arn Anderson, Ole Anderson, Tully Blanchard, and J. J. Dillon, with other members including Lex Luger, Sid Vicious, Sting, Steve McMichael, Dean Malenko, Chris Benoit, Brian Pillman, Curt Hennig, Barry Windham, and Paul Roma. In NXT, Flair's daughter Charlotte, Sasha Banks, Bayley, and Becky Lynch were nicknamed as "The Four Horsewomen" due to their matches helping to push the female wrestling roster in the show, even though the four of them were never on the same faction at the same time.
- "The Four Horsemen" was an informal discussion (on 30 September 2007) between Richard Dawkins, Christopher Hitchens, Sam Harris, and Daniel Dennett, during which they discussed definitions of atheism and the legitimacy of their criticism of religion.
- Four Horsemen of the Infocalypse, a term for Internet criminals, or the imagery of internet criminals.
- The Four Horsemen of Notre Dame was a group of football players at the University of Notre Dame under coach Knute Rockne in 1924. They were Harry Stuhldreher, Don Miller, Jim Crowley, and Elmer Layden. A United States Postal Service stamp was issued in their honor in 1998 bearing a black-and-white image from 1925 of the four players all on dark horses.
- "The Four Horsemen of the Supreme Court" refers to four United States Supreme Court justices Pierce Butler, James McReynolds, George Sutherland, and Willis Van Devanter, who consistently voted to overturn much of President Franklin D. Roosevelt's New Deal initiatives during the Great Depression.
- Psychologist John Gottman uses the term to describe the four most destructive behaviors harming relationships in his Cascade Model of Relational Dissolution. They are: criticism, defensiveness, contempt and stonewalling.
- "The Hideous Four Horsemen – Terror, Bewilderment, Frustration, Despair. Unhappy drinkers will understand!" is an important reference within the Big Book by Alcoholics Anonymous.
- The Four Horsemen of the Apocalypse in linguistics, Paul Postal, John R. Ross, George Lakoff, and James McCawley, initiated and did early work with generative semantics. This went against Noam Chomsky, the father of modern linguistics.
- The companies Google, Facebook, Apple and Amazon have been described as the "four horsemen of tech(nology)".

== In entertainment and media ==
=== Film ===
(Chronological)

- In The Four Horsemen of the Apocalypse (1921), a silent film produced by Metro Pictures Corporation, based on the eponymous novel by Vicente Blasco Ibáñez, the Four Horsemen were implied to be the result of human greed and war.
- The Four Horsemen make a brief appearance at the beginning of Faust (1926), directed by F. W. Murnau.
- The Four Horsemen of the Apocalypse (1962), another film based on Ibáñez's book that changes the timeline from the First to the Second World War. Starring Charles Boyer and Glenn Ford, and directed by Vincente Minnelli.
- Clint Eastwood's Pale Rider (1985) also alludes to Death on a pale horse, played by him.
- At least two of the Four Horsemen appear near the end of The Rapture (1991). However, their role is mostly off-camera and allegorical. Also, the film changes War to the first Horseman.
- The opening credits of Terminator 2: Judgment Day (1991) show four burning spring rocker horses as the allegory of the Four Horsemen.
- In Tombstone (1993), during the opening in a Mexican town, Johnny Ringo quotes the biblical Book of Revelation: "Behold the pale horse". The man who "sat on him was Death... and Hell followed with him".
- In True Lies (1994), Juno Skinner (Tia Carrere) is an arts and antiquities dealer who shows Harry Tasker (Arnold Schwarzenegger) and his wife Helen (Jamie Lee Curtis) four giant statues from ancient Persia saying: "I call them The Four Horsemen".
- In Elf (2003) the Central Park Rangers are presented as four shadowy figures on horseback, set to stop Santa Claus from saving Christmas, similar to the Four Horsemen as the harbingers of the apocalypse.
- In The Crow: Wicked Prayer (2005), four satanic cult members call themselves after the non-Biblical Four Horsemen – Death (David Boreanaz) who drives a black car, War (Marcus Chong) who drives a red SUV, Famine (Tito Ortiz) who drives a sickly yellow muscle car, and Pestilence (Yuji Okumoto) who drives a green Ford Pinto truck.
- Horsemen (2009) features murders that are inspired by the Four Horsemen.
- Now You See Me (2013) features a group of magicians who go by the name of The Four Horsemen.
- X-Men: Apocalypse is a (2016) film whose lead character Apocalypse is seen in a post-credit teaser in the film X-Men: Days of Future Past with the Four Horsemen watching as he builds pyramids. During the film, his initial Horsemen are killed when he is betrayed and sealed in his own tomb, but he escapes centuries later when a cult discovers his final resting place, emerging into the modern world. Apocalypse recruits Magneto, Psylocke, Storm, and Archangel as his new Horsemen, enhancing their powers to ensure their service to him.
- Knock at the Cabin is a 2023 film in which a girl and her two dads, while vacationing, are taken hostage by four armed strangers who demand that the family make a choice to avert the apocalypse.

=== Literature and comic books ===
(Alphabetical by author or comics publisher)

- Emerson Abreu, one of the writers of the Brazilian comic book series Monica Teen, presents a variation of the mythology, where the Horsemen are called Horses and they serve an evil mysterious entity named the Serpent (possibly alluding to either the Biblical Genesis Serpent or Ancient Serpent). Each Horse is presented every two years, with their roster including the spoiled high-school girl Penha as the Red Horse of War, the evil creature known as the Flying Donkey (resulting from the merging between sorceress Berenice and the spirit of her deceased daughter) as the Pale Horse of Death, and Captain Fray (a supervillain with power over pollution) as "The White Horse of Decay".
- Incarnations of Immortality, a long-running series of fantasy novels by Piers Anthony, was influenced by the mythology of the Four Horsemen. The titles of two books in the series, On a Pale Horse and Wielding a Red Sword, refer to Death and War respectively, though they are not formally titled such; the books revolve around characters whose supernatural duties are similar to those of the Horsemen. The Incarnation of War has four associated lesser incarnations in a seeming of the Four Horsemen: Famine, Pestilence, Conquest, and Slaughter.
- In Archie Comics' Teenage Mutant Ninja Turtles Adventures #38–39 and Mighty Mutanimals #6 ("United We Stand, Divided We Fall"), the Four Horsemen are represented as Famine, War, Pestilence and Death, the former three appearing as colorful monsters and Death resembling the Grim Reaper. War also appears as a playable character in the Super NES version of the Tournament Fighters video game.
- In Blart: The Boy Who Didn't Want To Save The World, by Dominic Barker, Blart and the gang, when facing Zoltab, have to fight the Four Horsemen of the Apocalypse.
- Women of the Apocalypse, an anthology of four novellas by Eileen Bell, Roxanne Felix, Ryan T. McFadden, and Billie Milholland (ISBN 978-1-77053-000-3) features four modern, Albertan heroines facing down the Four Horsemen, in four speculative fiction variants on the Four Horsemen of the Apocalypse.
- In The Talismans of Shannara by Terry Brooks, Shadowen who have taken the forms of the Four Horsemen are dispatched to kill Walker Boh.
- The title of Agatha Christie's 1961 novel The Pale Horse is an allusion to Revelation 6:8, where it is the horse ridden by Death.
- In Army of Darkness comics, published first by Dark Horse Comics and then Dynamite Entertainment, Ash is faced with the Four Horsemen.
- In DC Comics, the Four Horsemen of Apokolips were foretold in the Crime Bible. They were created by a coalition of evil scientists and caused Black Adam to go insane by killing his brother-in-law Osiris and his wife Isis. Sobek, an anthropomorphic crocodile who is initially presented as a friend of Osiris, is later revealed to be the Horseman of Famine, Yurrd.
- The back cover of MAD magazine #146 (October, 1971) (published by EC Comics) depicts "The Four Horsemen of the Metropolis", four riders who come forth to destroy the city. Their names are Drugs, Graft, Pollution, and Slums.
- In the Unicron Trilogy portion of Transformers, co-published by Hasbro and Takara, the Four Horsemen are Transformers who serve under Unicron.
- Jonathan Hickman's East of West features three of the Four Horsemen (War, Conquest, and Famine) as they seek revenge on the fourth (Death) and work towards bringing about the Apocalypse.
- Los Cuatro Jinetes del Apocalipsis (The Four Horsemen of the Apocalypse), a Spanish novel by Vicente Blasco Ibáñez whose English translation by Charlotte Brewster Jordan was the best-selling novel in the U.S. in 1919 (ISBN 978-1-4264-0564-8).
- The Lords of Deliverance series by Larissa Ione feature the Four Horsemen of the Apocalypse named as Pestilence, Famine, War and Death. In the series they try to avoid breaking their seals and causing an Apocalypse.
- Seraph of the End, a manga series written by Takaya Kagami, is set in a post-apocalyptic setting with creatures called the "Four Horsemen of John" that roam the ruins. Some of the main cast also carry the weapons of the Horsemen: Yoichi carries a bow, Yu carries a sword, Kimizuki carries twin swords (in place of scales) while Shinoa carries a scythe.
- In Chainsaw Man Part 1, the main villain is the Conquest Devil, Makima (translated as "Control Devil"), and in part 2, the War Devil, Famine Devil, and Death Devil are all introduced.
- In Marvel Family #48, the Marvels face the Four Horsemen in a story titled "The Four Horsemen Ride Again", wherein they try to cause disasters through humans. They are classed as Famine, Fire, Plague, and War. Unlike most depictions, it is claimed War is caused by the others.
- The Horsemen of Apocalypse are a team of Marvel Comics supervillains (usually manipulated superheroes; Angel, Wolverine, and Gambit, for example, all had stints as Horsemen of Death) who serve Apocalypse, an ancient, evil mutant who believes in survival of the fittest and causes disasters to this end.
- Those who come to retrieve Sethe in Toni Morrison's novel Beloved are referred to as the Four Horsemen: "When the four horsemen came—schoolteacher, one nephew, one slave catcher and a sheriff—the house on Bluestone Road was so quiet they thought they were too late" (174).
- The title of best-selling author James Patterson's fifth book in the Women's Murder Club series, The 5th Horseman, is a reference to the Biblical story.
- Terry Pratchett has parodied the Four Horsemen of the Apocalypse several times.
  - In Good Omens, co-written with Neil Gaiman, the Four Horsemen (or Horsepersons, as War is female) ride motorcycles. Pestilence is changed out for Pollution, who took over in 1936 when Pestilence left "muttering something about Penicillin." War is a war correspondent, and Famine is the author of a bestselling diet book. They have aliases that allude to their traditional colors (i.e. Raven Sable, Carmine Zuigiber). There is also a group of four Hells Angels that follow them, taking the names of more mundane plagues such as Cruelty to Animals and No Alcohol Lager.
  - In Thief of Time, part of Pratchett's Discworld series, a fifth horseman is mentioned: Ronnie Soak (Kaos spelled backwards). He is the fifth member who quit before the group became famous and now works as a milkman. The book also explores how the Horsemen have become more man-based during their time in existence, such as War now largely old and dependent on his wife to remind himself of his daily activities. Death is also a major recurring character in the series.
- In Scud: The Disposable Assassin by Rob Schrab, Scud fights and kills the Four Horsemen of the Apocalypse.
- In the novel Darksiders: the Abomination Vault, the Four Horsemen undertake the role of destroying legendary magical weapons known as the "Grand Abominations". The book features only Death and War of the biblical four, with Conquest and Famine being replaced with Fury and Strife.
- In the novel Tantrics of Old, the Four Horsemen are part of the larger story arc and their origins are discussed from the perspective of the mythology within the book.

=== Music ===
- William Control's Revelations album is split into 4 EPs, each named after one of the four horses that the horsemen rode – The Pale, The Black, The Red and The White.
- Heroes, Saints and Fools, an album by Saracen features the song Horsemen of the Apocalypse.
- "4 Horsemen of the apocalypse", LP 1985, Bollock Brothers (containing "Faith healer").
- The punk band The Clash, on their album London Calling, have a song called "Four Horsemen".
- The album artwork for Muse's fourth studio album, Black Holes and Revelations, features an alternate Four Horsemen - Ignorance, Paranoia, Vanity, and Greed - sitting around a table on the planet Mars. Their respective horses are small, and on the table in front of them, to represent how each affliction of the horsemen has outgrown those of their horses.
- Thrash metal band Metallica's 1983 song "The Four Horsemen" directly references the Four Horsemen of the Apocalypse. However, in their version the riders are Time, Famine, Pestilence and Death (perhaps for Metrical-Rhythmical reasons). Horsemen of the Apocalypse was also one of Metallica's demos.
- Parody band Beatallica wrote the song "For Horsemen", a mash-up of Metallica's "The Four Horsemen" and The Beatles' "For No One".
- The song "The Four Horsemen" on the Judas Priest album Nostradamus directly references the Four Horsemen of the Apocalypse.
- The lyrics to "Cattle and the Creeping Things" by The Hold Steady refer to the Four Horsemen (among several other Biblical references): "They got to the part with the cattle and the creeping things. They said I'm pretty sure we've heard this one before. Don't it all end up in some revelation? With four guys on horses, and violent red visions? Famine, and death, and pestilence and war? I'm pretty sure I heard this one before."
- The lyrics to "Revelations" by DragonForce feature a veiled reference to the Four Horsemen in the latter part of the chorus: "And the Horsemen shall come, they will judge all your lives, Revelations will now be unveiled."
- The punk band Gallows reference the four horsemen in their song "Death Voices" with the lyric "Four riders, four horses. Bring me famine, bring me death. Bring me war and pestilence."
- In the song "The Man Comes Around" by Johnny Cash, there are multiple references at the beginning and end of the song to the four horsemen, namely Pestilence or Conquest and the pale horserider Death.
- Megadeth's song "Blessed Are The Dead" from the album United Abominations refers to a "White horse on the clouds of death, a red warhorse to end all wars, a pale horse and pestilence led by a black horse with famine and scales", referencing the Four Horsemen. However, the white horse and the pale horse's representations are switched, with the white horse representing death instead of pestilence, and vice versa for the pale horse. The album cover also features mascot Vic Rattlehead with traits of the Horsemen (white with blood-stained wings like Conquest, long black hair and a black cloak resembling the black horse of Famine, wielding various firearms like the sword used by the War Horseman, and has pale, venous-looking skin like that of Death).
- Klaxons refer directly to the four horsemen of the apocalypse in a hidden track at the end of their debut studio album.
- Aphrodite's Child's song "The Four Horsemen" describes the Four Horsemen directly. Its parent album, 666 is an adaptation of The Book of Revelation.
- The song "Revelation (Death's Angel)" by Manowar features many references to the Four Horsemen and the Apocalypse itself.
- Marilyn Manson's song "Four Rusted Horses" references the four horsemen as being worn out.
- The band Jesus H. Christ & The Four Hornsmen Of The Apocalypse is a reference.
- The Canadian band Red Ryder's name refers to the rider of the red horse of war.
- The extreme metal band Demonoid's debut album Riders of the Apocalypse is a concept album about the Four Horsemen.
- Swedish metal guitarist Yngwie Malmsteen has a song called "Four Horsemen (Of The Apocalypse)" on his 2008 album Perpetual Flame.
- Finnish doom metal band Reverend Bizarre has a song called "Apocalyptic Riders". The song has direct citations from the Bible about The Four Horsemen.
- The music video "I Feel Better" by Hot Chip is loosely based on The Four Horsemen of The Apocalypse
- In the storyboard film for Gorillaz' Rhinestone Eyes, the Boogieman is hinted at being a contemporary of the Horsemen, or possibly the Fifth Seal.
- The music video for Magnetic Man's "Getting Nowhere ft John Legend" depicts 4 urban BMX riders in hoodies biking through the city. The four bikers are seen wearing black, white, red and grey hoodies, symbolizing the colors of the Horsemen. Throughout the video they are present during situations of conflict, famine and death.
- Rapper Canibus has a song called "Horsementality" (aka "Abide By") on his album 2000 B.C. (Before Can-I-Bus) featuring Ras Kass, Kurupt, Killah Priest. The four came together and formed the super group called The HRSMN aka "The Four Horsemen" where each member references themselves to each rider.
- The cover of the "Weird Al" Yankovic album Alpocalypse features Yankovic riding the black horse (whose mane has Yankovic's trademark curly hair), accompanied by the other three horsemen.
- In New Orleans' Hip-Hop group known as "$uicideboy$" has a song called "My Flaws Burn Through My Skin Like Demonic Flames from Hell" from the album I No Longer Fear The Razor Guarding My Heel in which the group's own "Ruby da Cherry" references the horsemen while he is on a psychedelic trip on the road.
- Die Apokalyptischen Reiter, German for The Riders of the Apocalypse, is a German Metal Band.
- The Horsemen feature prominently in The Indelicates album David Koresh Superstar.
- In the song "The Grand Conjuration" by Opeth from Ghost Reveries makes a reference to the pale horse rider (Death) searching the Earth.
- In the Genesis song "Anyway", from The Lamb Lies Down on Broadway, the character Rael is facing death in a cave and sings "Anyway, they say she comes on a pale horse, But I'm sure I hear a train."
- The Harvey Danger song "Plague of Locusts", off the EP Sometimes You Have to Work on Christmas (Sometimes), directly refers to the Four Horsemen of the Apocalypse in the lines, "The names are in the Book, not yours, Four horsemen ride the range, Hark! The herald angels' carnage, Pestilence and bloodshed wash away all your mistakes, Before they cast your wretched flesh into the Fiery Lake."
- Norwegian Black Metal band Satyricon refer directly to the four horsemen and the apocalypse, in the song "The Dawn of a new Age" from the album Nemesis Divina
- Entombed has a song called "Warfare, Plague, Famine, Death" in reference to the four horsemen, on their album Serpent Saints – The Ten Amendments
- The punk rock band The Dead Milkmen entitled their 1997 greatest hits album "Death Rides a Pale Cow". This is a combination of the band's symbol (a hand-drawn smiling cow with "x-ed" out eyes) and Death riding upon a pale horse.
- Australian Metalcore band Parkway Drive's song "Leviathan I" contains the lyrics "Show me War. Show me Pestilence." Their song "Dark Days" contains the lyrics "Behold the Pale Horse", in reference to Death.
- Polish alternative rock/post-punk band Kult have a song entitled "Jeźdźcy" (Polish for "The Horsemen") on their album "Spokojnie"; the song describes the first three riders to carry Famine, War and Death, respectively whilst the last one which is referred to as "more powerful than the other three" brings "Love", "Faith" and "Hope" as well as "the Sun" and "Stars".
- Norwegian Complextro artist Savant's album Protos contains a song called "Rider In Red", named after the second rider.
- American songwriter and musician Ray Wylie Hubbard's 2009 album A. Enlightenment B. Endarkenment (Hint: There is no C) contains the song The Four Horsemen of the Apocalypse whose lyrics directly reference Revelations and end each stanza with "the Four Horsemen of the Apocalypse."
- American country music singer Cody Jinks's song "Heavy Load" from the 2016 album I'm Not the Devil quotes Revelation saying "I heard the voice of the fourth beast say 'come and see,' and I looked, and behold, a pale horse, and his name that sat on him was death. And hell followed with him."
- Greek black metal band Rotting Christ have a song entitled "The Four Horsemen" on their 2016 album Rituals describing the Four Horsemen directly.
- Folk rock duo The Oh Hellos, have songs called "Where is Your Rider" and "Pale White Horse" on their 2014 Album Dear Wormwood referencing both the Four Horseman and Christian iconography in both song title and lyrics.
- Swedish metal band Ghost's song "Marks Of The Evil One" on their 2025 album Skeletá directly mentions and describes the Four Horsemen as they are depicted in the Book of Revelation, and also mentions the seals from which the Horsemen emerge.

=== Tabletop roleplaying games ===
- Deadlands and its sequels call the Four Horsemen the "Reckoners" and each has dominion over an area of the Weird West, with their Servitors directly furthering the goals of each. Their ultimate goal is to walk the earth in bodily form, which they achieve shortly before the events of Deadlands: Hell on Earth.
- The Pathfinder Roleplaying Game interprets the Four Horsemen as the most powerful members of a neutral evil race known as daemons. Every daemon seeks to become a horseman, to the point that the current horsemen are routinely killed for the role. The sole exception for this is the horseman of death, Charon, who has held the position since the beginning of daemonkind. In addition to war, pestilence, famine, and death, a fifth horseman is rumored to exist known as the Oinodaemon, but what he represents or if he even exists is up for debate.

=== Television ===
(Alphabetical by series)

- In Babylon 5, the Centauri ambassador Londo Mollari refers to his three unloved wives as "Famine", "Pestilence" and "Death", which is ironic as apparently such labelling leaves the title of "War" to himself. This was acknowledged by J. Michael Straczynski on the commentary track, as Mollari was a key ally of the Shadows.
- In the Charmed episode "Apocalypse Not", the horsemen are depicted as well-dressed demons who run the Apocalypse like a business, and have to try to bring it about by a certain time or they will be vanquished by the Source of all Evil. Although the sisters temporarily trap War in a dimensional portal, they are forced to work with the other three Horsemen when Prue Halliwell is trapped in the rift as well, but the sisters' willingness to leave Prue in the portal to stop the Horsemen by keeping War trapped prompts the higher powers to release Prue as their willingness to sacrifice their sister for the world suggests that the Apocalypse will not succeed. Interesting to note, Conquest was replaced by Strife, instead of the usual proxy of Pestilence.
- The Colbert Report, an American late night news satire television program, features a recurring segment called "Four Horsemen of the A-Pop-calypse". In this segment, Stephen Colbert denounces the media (divided into the four categories of books, television, movies and radio) for supposedly hastening the apocalypse.
- In Dexter, Season 6, episode 3 "Smokey and the Bandit", the closing scene of the episode sees the Season 6 villains staging the Four Horsemen of the Apocalypse in order to scare residents of Miami, and features a close-up on the severed head of a man previously killed, the 'Four Horsemen' consisting of four dummies mixed with the severed limbs of his latest victim mixed in with the dummy limbs.
- In Digimon Adventure, the final enemies the Chosen Children face are the four Dark Masters (consisting of MetalSeadramon, Mugendramon, Pinocchimon, and Piemon), followed by Apocalymon, paralleling the story of the Four Horsemen of the Apocalypse.
- In Good Omens, Pestilence lost its job as a Horseman due to advances in medicine making its powers moot and is replaced with Pollution.
- In the Hercules: The Legendary Journeys episode "Revelations", the archangel Michael releases the Four Horsemen one by one to end the World. Hercules and Iolaus team with Ares in an attempt to stop them. When Hercules sacrifices himself to stop Death, Michael states that this was a test to see if humanity can be given another chance which Hercules succeeded in. The Four Horsemen are assumed to have been resealed afterwards.
- In Highlander: The Series, the Four Horsemen are the Immortals Kronos (the leader of the Horsemen), Methos (Duncan McLeod's friend who previously refused to admit to being a Horseman, also claimed himself as Death), Silas, and Caspian.
- In the Jericho episode "Four Horsemen", after the storm ceases, Jake devises a plan in which four cars drive in four directions in an attempt to contact survivors and gather information. Gray Anderson, the Mayor's main political rival, refers to the scout party as "The Four Horsemen".
- The Messengers features a group of four people chosen by "The Man" (Diogo Morgado) as the new Horsemen of the Apocalypse, in a mission to break the seven seals. Until now, only three horsemen were confirmed:
  - Rose Arvale (Anna Diop) is a recurring character and a former nurse who initially acts as the de facto leader, claiming to have the ability to understand any language. In the episode "Death Becomes Her", the eponymous Messengers learn that Rose is a Horseman despite not sharing of the Man's ideals for world domination. Her real power is mastery of dark magic.
  - Senator Cindy Richards (Lauren Bowles) is War and debuts in the fourth episode ("Drums of War"). She had a son who was killed while serving in the Armed Forces, and then she planned to have the Afghan Prime Minister assassinated.
  - Leland Schiller/"Abaddon" (Sam Littlefield) is Pestilence and debuts in the sixth episode ("Metamorphosis"). Known anonymously as a vigilante hacker, Leland wants revenge against an insurance company that denied the medical support for his ill mother. After his attempt was foiled by the Messengers, he was sent to prison, only to be soon released by Rose Arvale.
- In a Metalocalypse two-minute animated promo for Darksiders II (aired August 17, 2012) the members of Dethklok play Darksiders II and end up summoning the game's protagonist, the Horseman Death.
- In fourth series finale of Misfits, the Four Horsemen of the Apocalypse are featured, as guest character Nadine accidentally released the horsemen, but instead of horses they rode black bicycles.
- In The Real Ghostbusters animated TV series from 1986, there is an episode where Janine accidentally releases the Four Horsemen from an ancient book in which they were once sealed a thousand years ago by a saint. In order to stop the Apocalypse, the Ghostbusters must travel to Greece for the saint's seal, since their traps can only hold the Horsemen for a short time.
- In the Red Dwarf episode "Gunmen of the Apocalypse", the regulars find themselves in a computer simulation of a Wild West town, facing a gunfight against the Four Horsemen of the Apocalypse.
- In the Robot Chicken episode "Cracked China", the Four Horsemen are referenced in a sketch called "Apocalypse Ponies", parodying both My Little Pony and the Four Horsemen.
- In Sleepy Hollow, the headless horseman is revealed to be one of the Four Horsemen, Death. The horseman seeks his head in order to regain his full power, summon the other three horsemen and begin the apocalypse. In the course of the series, Ichabod Crane's long-lost son Henry Parish is the Horseman of War, and they briefly encounter the Horseman of Pestilence, who is responsible for the destruction of the colony of Roanoke. In the fourth season, new series antagonist Malcolm Dreyfuss attempts to gather a new group of Horsemen to trigger the apocalypse as part of a complex plan to cheat his own deal with the devil, but although he is able to create a new Horseman of Pestilence and Famine while 'recruiting' the Horseman of Death, Ichabod is able to cheat Dreyfuss by temporarily becoming a new Horseman of War and then defeat some of Dreyfuss's forces, followed by Henry returning as a new Horseman of War before he turns against Dreyfuss to assert his own freedom.
- In The Simpsons episode "Simpsons Bible Stories", the Simpson family sleep through a church sermon and wake up to the apocalypse, where the Four Horsemen are shown riding on a red cloud through the sky.
  - In the episode "Bart Gets an Elephant", when Stampy the elephant walks through the Flanders' yard, Ned Flanders wakes up and gasps, "It's the four elephants of the apocalypse!" Maude Flanders immediately corrects him, "That's horsemen, Ned."
- In Squidbillies season 3 episode "Armageddon It On!", the Cuyler clan briefly meets Horseman of Pestilence (voiced by Riley Martin). Despite being one of the Four Horsemen of the Apocalypse the Cuylers are not fazed by his presences (at first they think he is part of the US Air Force). He shows his power by releasing a plague of "scorpions with human faces" and turns water into blood, however to his astonishment and disgust the squids eat the scorpions and drink the blood. Early and Granny are also unimpressed by him and question why he is even one of the Four Horsemen as he doesn't seem to measure up to the other 3 Horsemen (War, Famine, and Death). Insulted the Horsemen leaves but warns to prepare for the end of days.
- An episode of Stargate SG-1, "The Fourth Horseman", references the Horseman Pestilence as a deadly disease, created by a Prior of the Ori, is spread across the face of the Earth.
- In Supernatural, the Four Horsemen are referenced in the fourth-season episode "Death Takes A Holiday" by the demon Alistair before he goes to kill two reapers in an effort to break a seal that will lead to releasing Lucifer from Hell. Alistair claims that the scythe he is carrying was borrowed from an old friend who did not "really ride a pale horse" but who does "have three amigos" who are "jonesing for the Apocalypse". After the raising of Lucifer at the end of the fourth season, the Horsemen are unleashed onto the world. Each takes the form of a male with an appropriately coloured car and a ring that imbues them their power. However, these rings are also the only apparent weakness of War, Famine and Pestilence, as removing their rings weakens them considerably, although Death is unaffected by the removal of his ring (Death is only following Lucifer's agenda due to a spell binding him to Lucifer, although the other three Horsemen appear to be willing servants of Lucifer). In "Hammer of the Gods", the final message of the archangel Gabriel reveals that the Horsemen's rings have the power to recapture Lucifer by re-opening his Cage when they are put together and a particular spell is chanted.
  - In the fifth-season episode "Good God, Y'All!", War, portrayed by Titus Welliver, makes an appearance. He drives a cherry red Ford Mustang and uses the ring on his right ring finger to make people hallucinate and kill each other by provoking conflict; in the episode, he divides a town by causing two groups to believe that the other side has been possessed by demons, but his influence is ended when Sam and Dean manage to cut off his ring.
  - In the episode "My Bloody Valentine", Famine, portrayed by James Otis, appeared as a sick, wheelchair-using old man and causes suicides in a town by making people consume/perform what they hunger for until their death; examples include a couple hungering for love literally eating each other, a man on a diet gorging himself on Twinkies, a former alcoholic drinking himself to death, and even the protagonist's angelic ally Castiel is attacked through his vessel's hunger for red meat. Arriving with an entourage of demons in a black SUV, Famine would feast on souls until he was strong enough to spread on his own. He was defeated when Dean Winchester proved immune to his powers – albeit because Dean was spiritually dead after the difficulties he had experienced during the Apocalypse – and Sam Winchester's old demonic powers were awakened when Famine restored his addiction to demon blood, allowing Sam to use his demonic powers to attack Famine by attacking the demons he had consumed.
  - Pestilence, portrayed by Matt Frewer appears at the end of "Hammer Of The Gods". He walks into a service station and spreads disease by spreading sickly, green slime everywhere and bringing flies into the place. He is then shown driving away in a dirty Pinto whilst flies flood the car; his rampage is shown in the next episode, "The Devil You Know", causing regional outbreaks of swine flu across the nation. He actively appeared in "Two Minutes to Midnight", shown capable to infect humans with a plethora of diseases, also being a pivotal part of Lucifer's apocalypse; his pandemic of swine flu allowed the distribution of the Croatoan virus under the guise of vaccines. He was working in a nursing home, crafting hybrid diseases that caused instant death. Castiel was ultimately responsible for destroying him when he proved partly immune to Pestilence's powers despite his weakened condition.
  - The Horsemen Death is summoned to Earth by Lucifer via a ritual in the episode "Abandon All Hope...", albeit unseen. He is then mentioned in "Dead Men Don't Wear Plaid", though again not seen, where he raises fifteen dead who return to their families only to turn rabid after a certain time. In "Two Minutes to Midnight", Death, now portrayed by Julian Richings, is shown walking along the street with a cane; he bumps into a man, who after making a pithy remark, soon falls over dead. Death drives a pale 1959 Cadillac Eldorado Seville. Death explains to Dean that he is unwillingly bound to Lucifer, and is not particularly interested in the apocalypse. Death provides his ring, extracting a promise that Dean will do anything to stop Lucifer. This version of Death claims to be as old as, if not older than, God, as neither of them can remember who came first. An eternal being, Death reappears after the apocalypse, helping Dean recover Sam's soul – still trapped in Lucifer's Cage even after his body was rescued – helping the Winchesters restore Castiel to normal after he was driven mad by the souls he acquired from Purgatory by providing them with the means to perform a ritual to separate the Purgatory souls from Castiel, and coming to talk to Sam when he faced death after failing to complete the trials to seal Hell. Death was killed by Dean in the tenth-season finale when he was preparing to kill Dean to free him from the Mark of Cain – Dean using Death's scythe to slay him – later Sam met another Reaper and after a subsequent conversation with that Reaper revealing that a new Death will be formed and resurrections will no longer be permitted. This reaper, Billie (Lisa Berry), is killed by Castiel in "First Blood" while she's preparing to permanently reap one of the Winchesters. A subsequent episode, "Advanced Thanatology", reveals that Billie has been promoted under the rule that the first reaper to be killed after Death dies becomes the new Death.
- In the final episode of Tru Calling, "'Twas the Night Before Christmas...Again", Tru calls her foil character Jack the fourth horseman of the apocalypse, as he is frequently referenced as "death".
- The Walking Dead episode "Arrow on the Doorpost" was originally titled "Pale Horse".
- In the final season of X-Men: Evolution, Apocalypse transforms Mystique, Storm, Professor X, and Magneto into his Horsemen, respectively giving them the names War, Famine, Pestilence, and Death.
- In The Young Ones, season 1, episode 5 "Interesting", which first aired in the UK in 1982, Rick Mayall and Nigel Planer are preparing the house for a party when a born-again Christian preacher, played by Dawn French pushes her way inside. As she warns the guys to behold Armageddon and the four horsemen of the apocalypse the scene cuts to a surreal comedy sketch featuring the Four Horsemen on a hillside.

=== Video games ===
(Alphabetical by title)

- In Ace Combat 5: The Unsung War, there is a mission called The Four Horsemen.
- In Afterlife, the Four Horsemen are depicted as the Four Surfers of the Apocalypso, which are summoned if a player stays in extreme debt for too long a period. The Four Surfers appear riding a wave of fire and destruction and destroy the player's afterlife, thus ending the game.
- In Apocalypse, Trey Kincaid (the protagonist, played by Bruce Willis) must battle The Reverend, who has unleashed The Four Horsemen. The Horseman are named Death, Plague, War and Beast, and appear as bosses.
- In Battlefield 1's fourth and final DLC of the game, Apocalypse, there are four unlockable dog tags called Pestilence, Famine, War and Death. Each one is unlocked by accomplishing very difficult missions and feature different cavalry soldiers. The dog tags have unique tints on them, such as rust, bloodstains or mustard gas stains. On the in-game map Zeebrugge, if all four dog tags are present in a match, the moon turns into a blood moon and a war horn followed by the sound of galloping horses can be heard by all players.
- In The Binding of Isaac, the horsemen appear as possible bosses throughout the game. Noticeably, the game depicts both interpretations of the first rider as different characters (With Conquest being labeled as "a forgotten horseman"). Before fighting the final boss, the player has to defeat the "Ultra Harbingers", which are giant and more powerful versions of Pestilence, Famine, War and Death.
- In Call of Duty 4: Modern Warfare, the four primary antagonists are collectively referred to as "the Four Horsemen". One of them on the group photograph remains unidentified, but is implied to be already dead (he's crossed out like the others will be). In the sequel, Modern Warfare 2, the main antagonist, Vladimir Makarov, bears a heavy likeliness to the unidentified horseman from the first game. [This is confirmed in the third game.] Considering both the exploits of Makarov and that the Modern Warfare series was planned as a trilogy, it is very likely that he is the Second Horseman "War".
- In Champions: Return to Arms, the Four Horsemen can be battled in a bonus stage.
- In City of Heroes, players must defeat the four Riders in the second mission of The Lady Grey Task Force. These Riders are said to be among the alien Rikti race's most fearsome warriors and have the names Rider: War, Rider: Famine, Rider: Pestilence, and Rider: Death. In this high level (45–50) task force, a team of both heroes and villains can work together to defeat these enemies as they appear repeatedly throughout the mission. The mission culminates in a battle against all four Riders at once and allows players to continue onward in their drive to save the world from total war and invasion by the alien forces of the Rikti.
- In The Darkness, after the protagonist commits suicide, he finds himself in the Otherworld and must locate physical manifestations of the Four Horsemen before proceeding through the level and return to the living. Only Death (three people upside-down on a cross) and War (a massive, grotesque cannon) must be found to complete the section.
- The Darksiders franchise revolves around the Four Horsemen as playable characters, who are named War, Death, Fury and Strife. The story of the first game, featuring War, also involves the Seven Seals, with the Horsemen supposed to be unleashed upon the breaking of the seventh. The subsequent games draw inspiration from other biblical themes outside of Revelation.
- In Destiny, one of the exotic weapons in the game is called "The 4th Horseman".
- In the Civilization IV mod Fall from Heaven, as the armageddon counter increases, four horsemen (Stephanos the conqueror, Bubos the warbringer, Yersinia the plague-bringer and Ars Moriendi, death itself) appear, terrorizing the human civilizations.
- In Fallout Shelter, one of the Overseer's Office tasks is a quest series called "The Horseman of the Post-Apocalypse", where the player investigates reports about the return of the horsemen.
- In Fallout Tactics: Brotherhood of Steel, players can randomly stumble across the four horsemen while wandering the world map (The encounter being named "Four Horsemen of the Post-Apocalypse" in reference to the nuclear war). They are sitting around a campfire, and make comments about the apocalypse, which has already occurred. Each horseman is in the "almost dead" health range, indicating that they have very low health compared to their maximum health. However, if a player attempts to heal any of the horseman, it becomes obvious that they each have ridiculous amounts of health, and that "almost dead" is still extremely high. Upon exiting the area, the player's party leader is switched for the squad member with the lowest charisma, thanks to the chaotic nature of the horsemen.
- In Final Fantasy VII, Sephiroth uses an attack called "Pale Horse".
- In Final Fight: Streetwise, a psychotic priest named Father Bella created a powerful strength-enhancing drug called "glow" and hopes to use the drug to bring about the apocalypse. Bella created his own Four Horsemen, consisting of Weasel as War, Dino "Blades" as Famine, Pestilence created by Dr. Chang, and Cody, the protagonist of the original Final Fight game and Kyle's older brother, as Death. Originally the role of Death was to Devin "The Stiff" Aronac but his transformation was incomplete due his defeat by Kyle as he had the letters "DE" to spell out Death.
- In Fire Emblem: Path of Radiance and Fire Emblem: Radiant Dawn, the once-evil kingdom of Daein holds four generals of utmost skill and power in battle who are referred to as the "Four Riders"—a reference to the Four Horsemen. Of the seven characters to have held the title of "Four Riders," only two of them (Petrine and Bertram) are known to ride mounts into combat. A third, Lanvega, is never depicted in either game, although his daughter Fiona is shown to ride a horse.
- The Four Horsemen of Apocalypse was a game project by 3DO.
- In Guild Wars, one of the quests in The Underworld is called the Four Horsemen, where one has to kill four ghostly horsemen. However, these are named differently.
- In Heroes of Newerth, five characters have alternate avatars named "War", "Famine", "Pestilence", "Death", and "Conquest".
- In Heroes Over Europe, upon receiving a Hawker Tempest, Danny Miller comments that it "seems the RAF wanted me to be one of the Four Horsemen of the Apocalypse".
- In Hexen 2, the Four Horsemen are featured as episode bosses. They appear in the order of Famine, Death, Pestilence and War. Each of the episodes featuring the Horsemen had a unique historical cultural setting in which they took place: Medieval Europe for Famine, Mesoamerica for Death, ancient Egypt for Pestilence, and Greco-Rome for War. In the story, the Horsemen are said to be the generals of Eidolon, who is the final boss of the game.
- "Ice Station Santa", the first of the five episodes of Sam & Max Beyond Time and Space for Xbox 360/Wii/PC, requires players to collect four horsemen action figures for a puzzle.
- In 2023, the 2018 video game Identity V released Season 26 Essence 1, themed after the four horsemen of the apocalypse. The S Tier for “Journalist” was Death, the A Tier for “Photographer” was War, the A Tier for “Nightmare” was Pestilence, and the logic path A Tier for “Hell Ember” was famine.
- Yorick, a playable character in League of Legends, used to have his abilities named after the four horsemen: Omen of War, Omen of Pestilence, Omen of Famine, and Omen of Death.
- In Lobotomy Corporation, the Horsemen' colors are used as damage types in a unique damage system : Red for physical trauma, White for psychological trauma, Black for both trauma, and Pale for death. Abnormalities and E.G.O. equipment as well as Ordeals are sorted according to this system.
- In Metal Gear 2: Solid Snake, a boss battle takes place where four assassins calling themselves the Four Horsemen attack Solid Snake in an elevator.
- The final level in NetHack features the three riders Death, Famine, and Pestilence as the game's final bosses. The fourth rider, War, is assumed to be the player.
- In Payday 2, there are a series of masks named Conquest, Death, Famine and War, with notes to the Four Horsemen of the Apocalypse in their description.
- In Peace, Death!, a Grim Reaper works under the Four Horsemen, mainly Death.
- In Quake Mission Pack 2: Dissolution of Eternity the temple itself features a unique set of stained glass windows, displaying the four Riders of the Apocalypse: Pestilence, Death, War and Famine.
- In Quake 4 the convoys which carries the EMPs to the tetranode are called "War", "Famine", "Pestilence" and "Death".
- In the Red Dead Redemption downloadable add-on, Undead Nightmare, four of the mountable mythical beings are horses labeled as Pestilence, War, Famine, and Death. They are associated with their own Rank, gaining a rank for every horse mounted and tamed. Each horse has its own special ability allowing you to deal with the undead differently. They are known as "The Four Horses of the Apocalypse".
- In Scribblenauts Unlimited, it is possible to spawn Pestilence, Famine, War, and Death. A secret "fifth" horseman is included as well, being Pollution.
- In Shin Megami Tensei: Nocturne and Shin Megami Tensei: Devil Summoner 2: Raidou Kuzunoha vs. King Abaddon the Four Horsemen appear as Red Rider, White Rider, Black Rider and Pale Rider and present challenging boss battles to the protagonists of both games.
- The Four Horsemen are bosses encountered in Naxxramas, a raid in World of Warcraft: Sir Zeliek as the White Rider of Conquest, Alexandros Mograine (now Baron Rivendare) as the Red Rider of War, Lady Blaumeux as the Black Rider of Famine, and Thane Korth'azz as the Pale Rider of Death.
  - In the "World of Warcraft: Legion" expansion, four new horsemen make an appearance as a part of the Knights of the Ebon Blade, the faction for players in the Death Knight class. Their leader is Darion Mograine, the Red Rider of War and the son of Alexandros Mograine. The other riders are: Sally Whitemane, former High Inquisitor of the Scarlet Crusade, as the White Rider of Conquest. Nazgrim, former general of the Horde, as the Black Rider of Famine. Lastly Thoras Trollbane, last king of the kingdom Stromguard, as the Pale Rider of Death. These new horsemen are under the player's command in their order hall if they are a Death Knight.
- In Total War: Attila the narrator quotes part of the bible about the horsemen. In not only the intro, but also another cutscene in the game, it is used to refer to Attila himself. Who in turn is the reason for the setting of the game.
- In Town of Salem 2, after completing a goal unique to their role, players in the "Neutral Apocalypse" faction can transform into the roles War, Famine, Pestilence, and Death.
- The Marvel Comics incarnation of the Horsemen of Apocalypse appear in Marvel: Avengers Alliance, consisting of X-23 as War, Rogue as Famine, Beast as Pestilence, and Iceman as Death.
- In the Xenosaga series, one of the main characters – chaos insinuating that the four U.R.T.V. variants (biological weapons) – Rubedo, Albedo, Citrine and Nigredo (from no. 666 to 669) are the Four Horsemen of the Apocalypse.
