= Blart =

The name Blart is used as a shortening for the following media:

== Films ==
- Paul Blart: Mall Cop, a 2009 U.S. film
- Paul Blart: Mall Cop 2, the above film's 2015 sequel

== Novels ==
- Blart: The Boy Who Didn't Want to Save the World, a 2006 novel
- Blart II: The Boy Who Was Wanted Dead or Alive – or Both, the above novel's 2007 sequel
- Blart III: The Boy Who Set Sail on a Questionable Quest, the 2008 conclusion to the series

== See also ==
- Blart Versenwald III, a fictional character from The Hitchhiker's Guide to the Galaxy
