= Four Horsemen of the Apocalypse =

Biblical figures

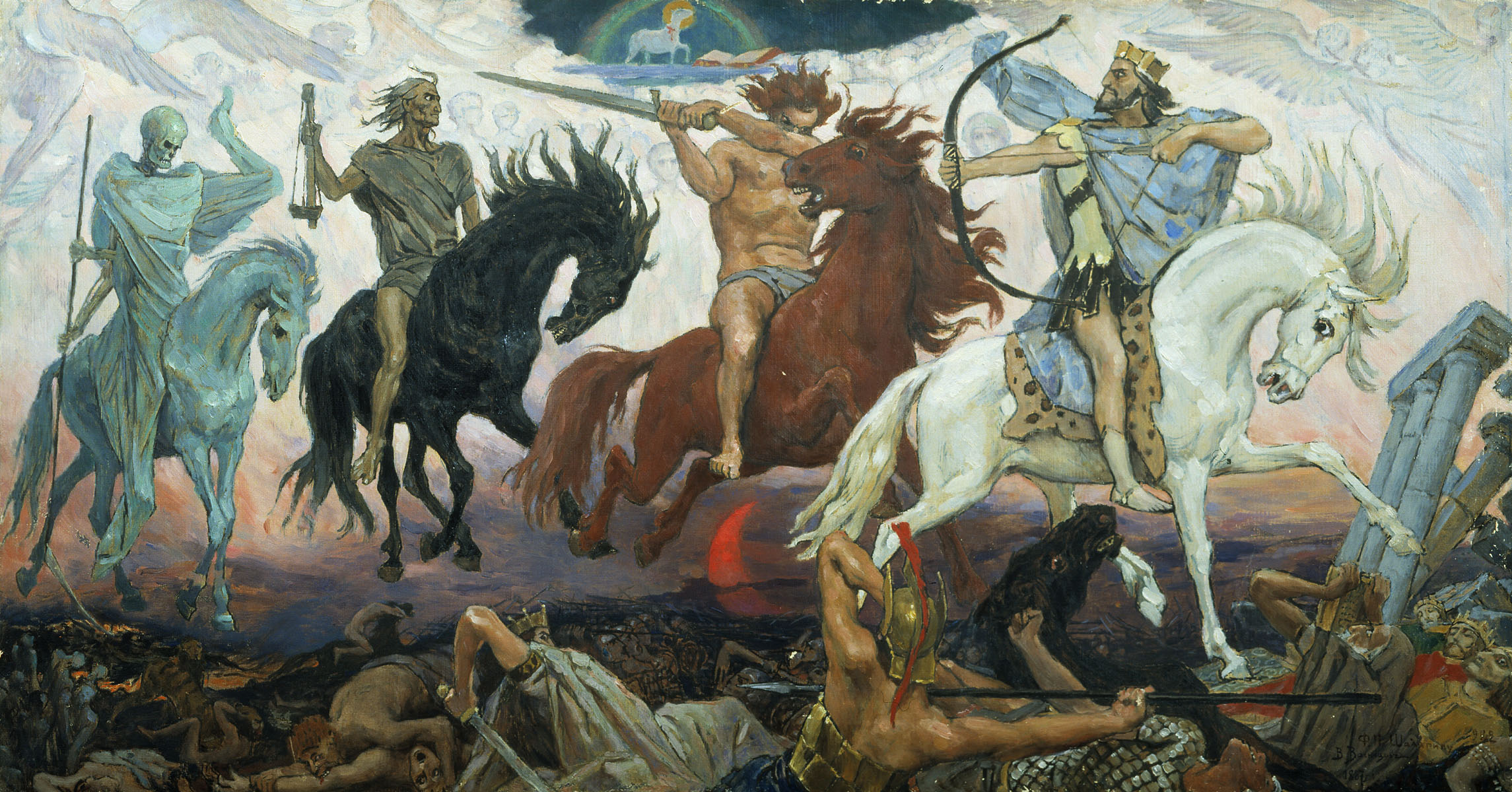
Four Horsemen of the Apocalypse, an 1887 painting by Viktor Vasnetsov. From left to right are Death, Famine, War, and Conquest; the Lamb is at the top.

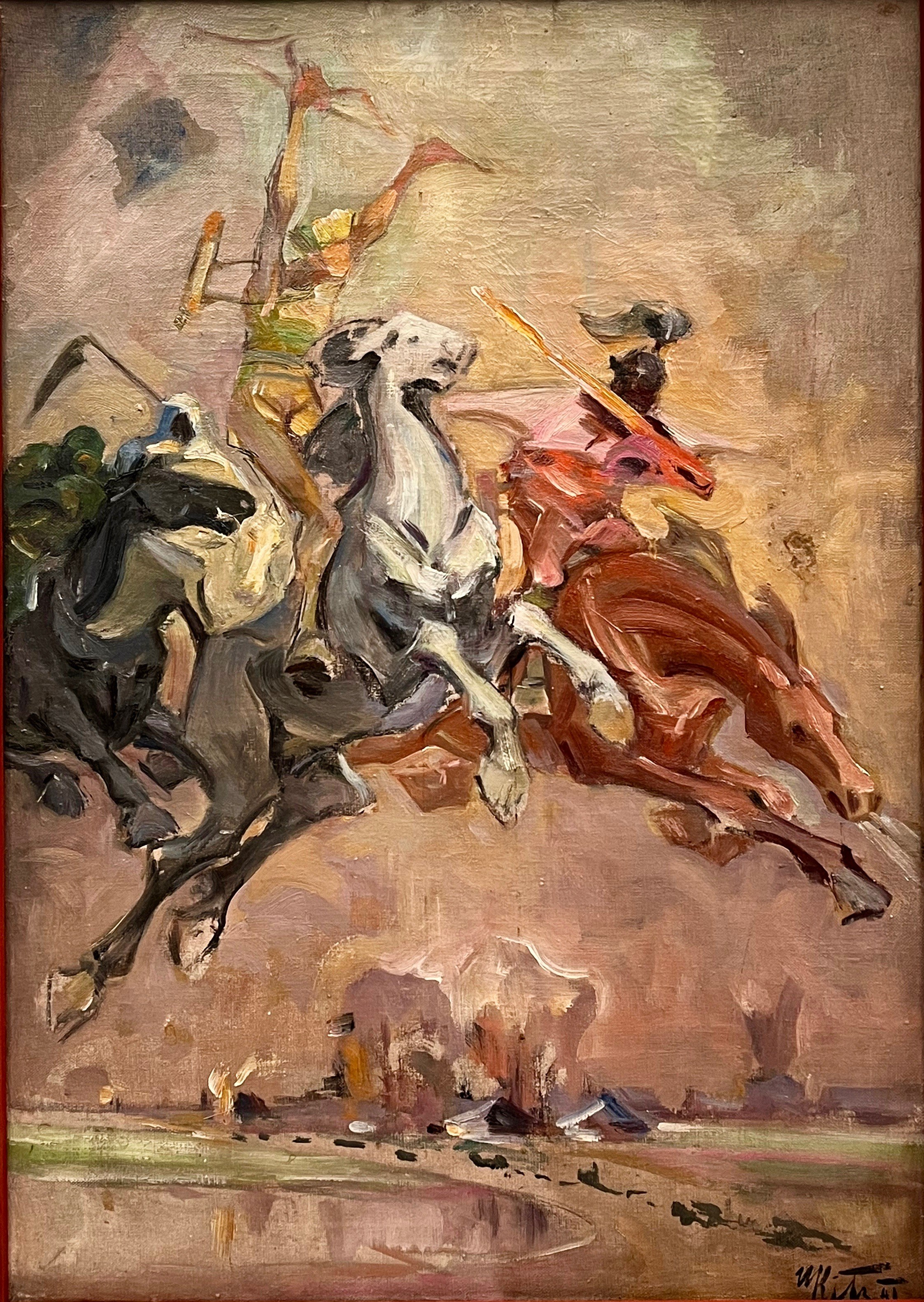
Marcin Kitz, Four Horsemen of the Apocalypse (1941)

The Four Horsemen of the Apocalypse are figures in the Book of Revelation in the New Testament of the Bible, a piece of apocalypse literature attributed to John of Patmos, and generally regarded as dating from about AD 95. Similar allusions are contained in the Old Testament books of Ezekiel and Zechariah, written centuries prior. Though the text only provides a name for the fourth horseman, subsequent commentary often identifies them as personifications of Conquest, War, Famine, and Death.

Revelation 6 tells of a book or scroll in God's right hand that is sealed with seven seals. The Lamb of God/Lion of Judah opens the first four of the seven seals, which summons four beings that ride out on white, red, black, and pale horses. All of the horsemen save for Death are portrayed as being human in appearance.

In John's revelation the first horseman rides a white horse, carries a bow, and is given a crown as a figure of conquest, perhaps invoking the Antichrist. The second carries a sword and rides a red horse as the creator of war, conflict, and strife. The third, a food merchant, rides a black horse symbolizing famine and carries a pair of scales. The fourth and final horse is pale, upon it rides Death, accompanied by Hades. "They were given authority over a quarter of the Earth, to kill with sword, famine and plague, and by means of the beasts of the Earth."

Christianity typically interprets the Four Horsemen as a vision of harbingers of the Last Judgment, setting a divine end-time upon the world.

== White Horse ==
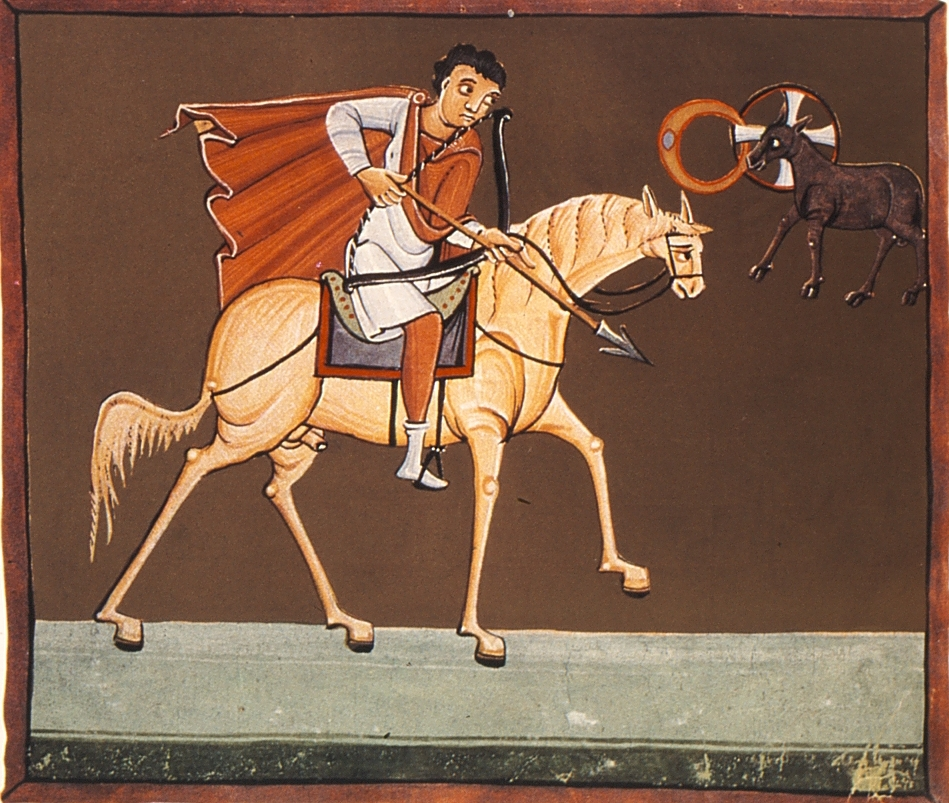
The first Horseman of the Apocalypse as depicted in the Bamberg Apocalypse (1000–1020). The first "living creature" (with halo) is seen in the upper right.

Then I saw when the Lamb broke one of the seven seals, and I heard one of the four living creatures saying as with a voice of thunder, "Come!" I looked, and behold, a white horse, and he who sat on it had a bow; and a crown was given to him, and he went out conquering and to conquer.

— Revelation 6:1–2 New American Standard Bible

The above passage is a common English translation of the rider of the White Horse (sometimes referred to as the White Rider). He is thought to carry a bow (Greek τόξον, tóxon) and wear a victor's crown (Greek στέφανος, stéphanos).

=== As Christ, the Gospel, or the Holy Spirit ===
For the broad historical interpretation of Christ as the rider of the white horse, it is to be understood that the Antichrist does not appear until the opening of the sixth seal. Events in world history since the founding of Christianity were interpreted as "horses" up to the sixth seal event. Therefore, this interpretation can be seen as either partially preterist, or an instance of dual fulfillment.

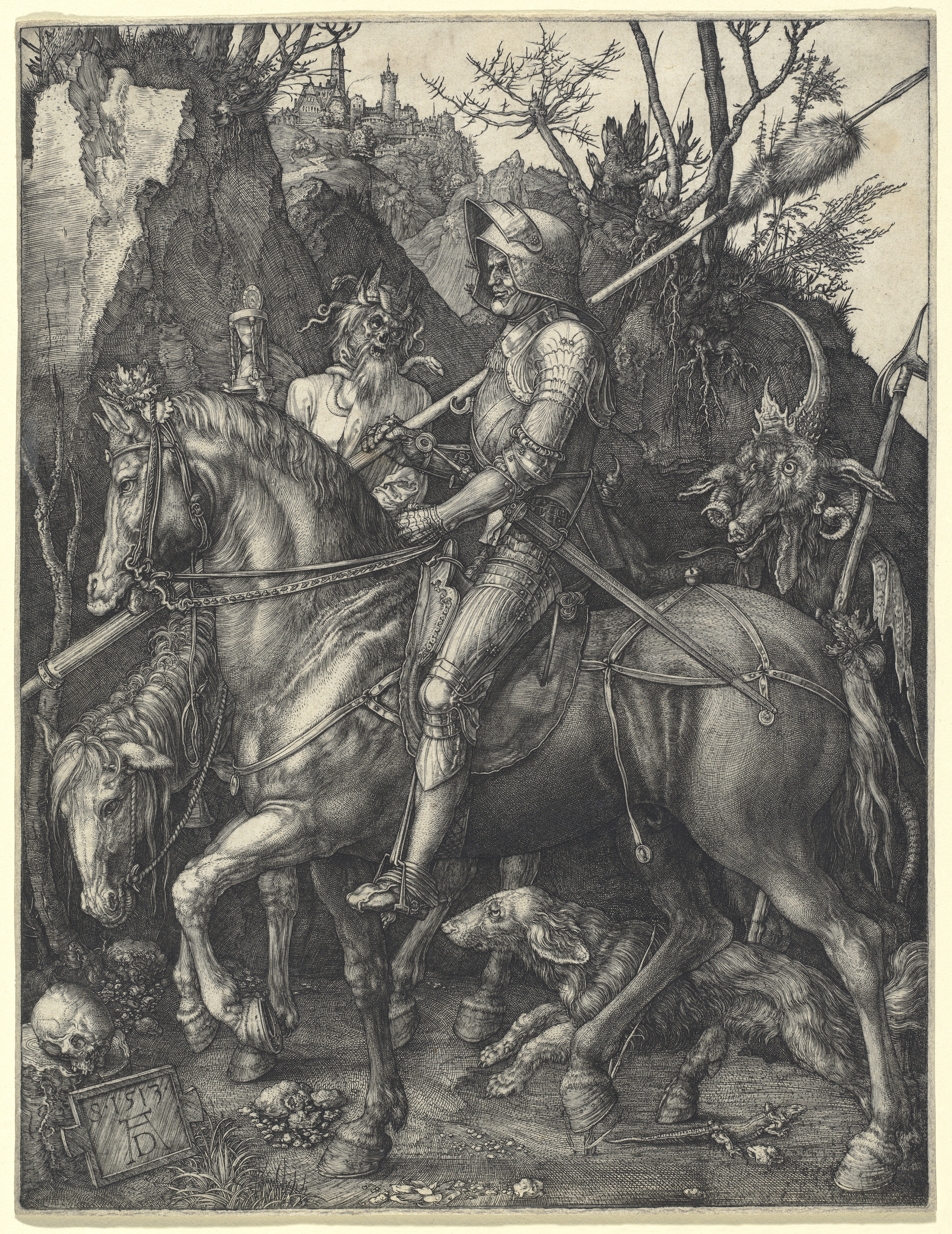
Albrecht Dürer, Knight, Death and the Devil, 1513.

In the New Testament, the Book of Mark indicates that the advance of the gospel may precede and foretell the apocalypse. The colour white also tends to represent righteousness in the Bible, and Christ is portrayed as a conqueror in other instances.

Besides Christ, the Horseman could represent the Holy Spirit. The Holy Spirit was understood to have come upon the Apostles at Pentecost after Jesus departed Earth. The appearance of the Lion in Revelation 5 shows the triumphant arrival of Jesus in Heaven, and the first Horseman may represent the sending of the Holy Spirit by Jesus and the advance of the gospel of Jesus Christ.

=== As the Antichrist ===
In 1866, C. F. Zimpel defended the hypothesis that the first horseman was the Antichrist (and more precisely, according to him, Napoleon Bonaparte). The Antichrist interpretation later found champions in the United States, such as R. F. Franklin in 1898 and W. C. Stevens in 1928. It remains popular in evangelical circles today, for example with Pastor Billy Graham, for whom the horseman represented the Antichrist or false prophets in general.

=== As Roman prosperity ===
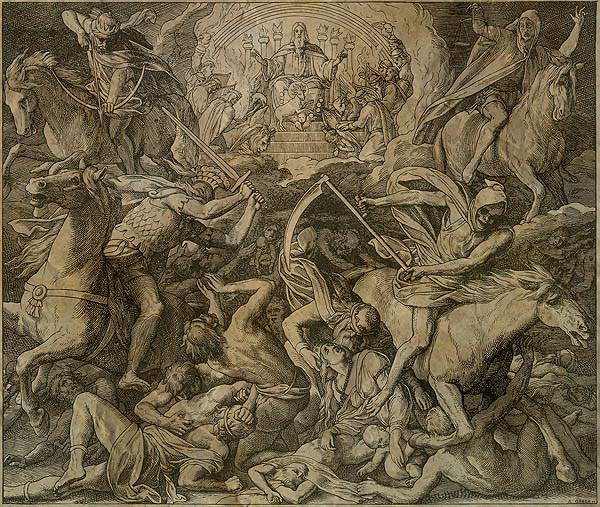
Four horsemen, by Julius Schnorr von Carolsfeld, 1860.

In Edward Bishop Elliott's interpretation, the Four Horsemen represent a prophecy of the Roman Empire's subsequent history; the horse's white color signifies triumph, prosperity, and health in the Roman political body. For the next 80 or 90 years, succeeding the banishment of the prophet John to the island of Patmos and covering the successive reigns of the emperors Nerva, Trajan, Hadrian, and the two Antonines (Antoninus Pius and Marcus Aurelius), a golden age of prosperity, union, civil liberty and good government unstained with civil blood unfolded. The agents of this prosperity, personified by the rider of the white horse, are these five emperors wearing crowns, who reigned with absolute authority and power under the guidance of virtue and wisdom, the armies being restrained by their firm and gentle hands.

According to this interpretation, this period in Roman history, both at its commencement and close, illustrated the empire's glory where its limits were extended, though not without occasional wars, which were always uniformly triumphant on the frontiers. The triumphs of Emperor Trajan, a Roman Alexander, added to the empire Dacia, Armenia, Mesopotamia, and other provinces during the first 20 years of the period, which deepened the impression on the minds of the barbarians of the invincibility of the Roman Empire. The Roman war progressed triumphantly into the invader's territory, and the total overthrow of those people successfully ended the Parthian war. Roman conquest is demonstrated even in the most mighty of these wars: the Marcomannic Wars, a succession of victories under the second Antonine, unleashed on the German barbarians, who were driven into their forests and reduced to Roman submission.

=== As war ===
In some commentaries, the white Horseman symbolizes war, which may be decently exercised on moral grounds, hence the white colour. The red Horseman (see below) specifically symbolizes civil war.

=== As infectious disease ===
Under another interpretation, the first Horseman is called Pestilence and is associated with infectious disease and plague. It appears at least as early as 1906 in the Jewish Encyclopedia. This particular interpretation is common in popular culture references to the Four Horsemen.

The origin of this interpretation is unclear. Some translations of the Bible mention "plague" (e.g. the New International Version) or "pestilence" (e.g. the Revised Standard Version) in connection with the riders in the passage following the introduction of the fourth rider; cf. "They were given power over a fourth of the Earth to kill by sword, famine, plague, and by the wild beasts of the Earth." in the NASB. However, the original Greek does not use the word for "plague" or "pestilence" here, simply "death" (θᾰ́νᾰτος, thánatos). The use of "pestilence" was likely drawn from other parts of the Book of Revelation and included here as another form of death. Also, whether this passage refers to the fourth rider only or the four riders as a whole is a matter of debate.

Vicente Blasco Ibáñez, in his 1916 novel The Four Horsemen of the Apocalypse (filmed in 1921 and in 1962), provides an early example of this interpretation, writing, "The horseman on the white horse was clad in a showy and barbarous attire. . . . While his horse continued galloping, he was bending his bow in order to spread pestilence abroad. At his back swung the brass quiver filled with poisoned arrows, containing the germs of all diseases".

== Red Horse ==
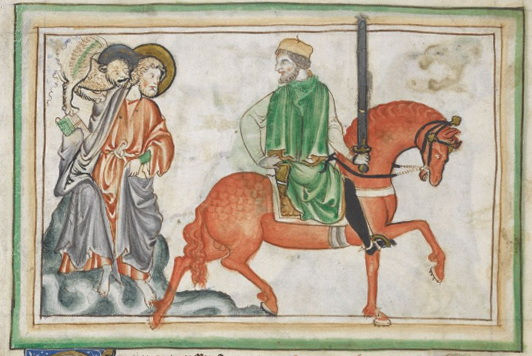
The second Horseman, War on the Red Horse, as depicted in a thirteenth-century Apocalypse manuscript.

When He broke the second seal, I heard the second living creature saying, "Come". And another, a red horse, went out; and to him who sat on it, it was granted to take peace from Earth, and that men would slay one another; and a great sword was given to him.

— Revelation 6:3–4 NASB

The rider of the second horse is often taken to represent War (he is often pictured holding a sword upwards as though ready for battle) or mass slaughter. His horse's color is red (πυρρός, purrhós from πῦρ, fire), and in some translations, the color is specifically a "fiery" red. The color red, as well as the rider's possession of a great sword (μάχαιρα, mákhaira), suggests blood that is to be spilled. As seen in heraldry, the sword held upward by the second Horseman may represent war or a declaration of war. In military symbolism, swords held upward, especially crossed swords held upward, signify war and entering into battle (see, for example, the historical and modern images and the coat of arms of Joan of Arc).

The second Horseman represents civil war as opposed to the war of conquest that the first Horseman is said to bring. Other commentators have suggested that it might also represent the persecution of Christians.

=== As imperial division ===
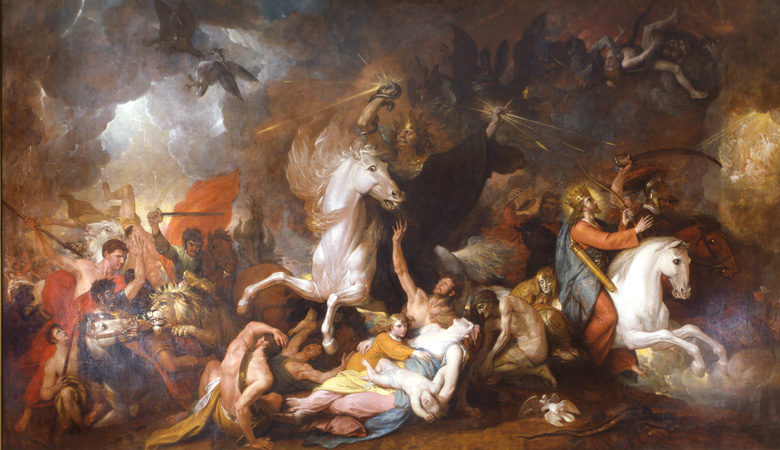
Death on the Pale Horse, Benjamin West, 1817.

According to Edward Bishop Elliott's interpretation of the Four Horsemen as symbolic prophecy of the history of the Roman Empire, the second seal is opened and the Roman nation that experienced joy, prosperity, and triumph is made subject to the red horse which depicts war and bloodshed—civil war. Peace left the Roman Earth, resulting in the killing of one another as insurrection crept into and permeated the Empire, beginning shortly into the reign of Emperor Commodus.

Elliott points out that Commodus, who had nothing to wish for and everything to enjoy, that beloved son of Marcus Aurelius who ascended the throne with neither competitor to remove nor enemies to punish, became the slave of his attendants who gradually corrupted his mind.

Elliott further recites that, after the death of Commodus, a most turbulent period lasting 92 years unfolded, during which time 32 emperors and 27 pretenders to the Empire hurled each other from the throne by incessant civil warfare. The sword was a natural universal badge, among the Romans, of the military profession. The apocalyptic figure armed with a great sword indicated an undue authority and unnatural use of it. Military men in power, whose vocation was war and weapon the sword, rose by it and also fell. The unrestrained military, no longer subject to the Senate, transformed the Empire into a system of pure military despotism.

== Black Horse ==
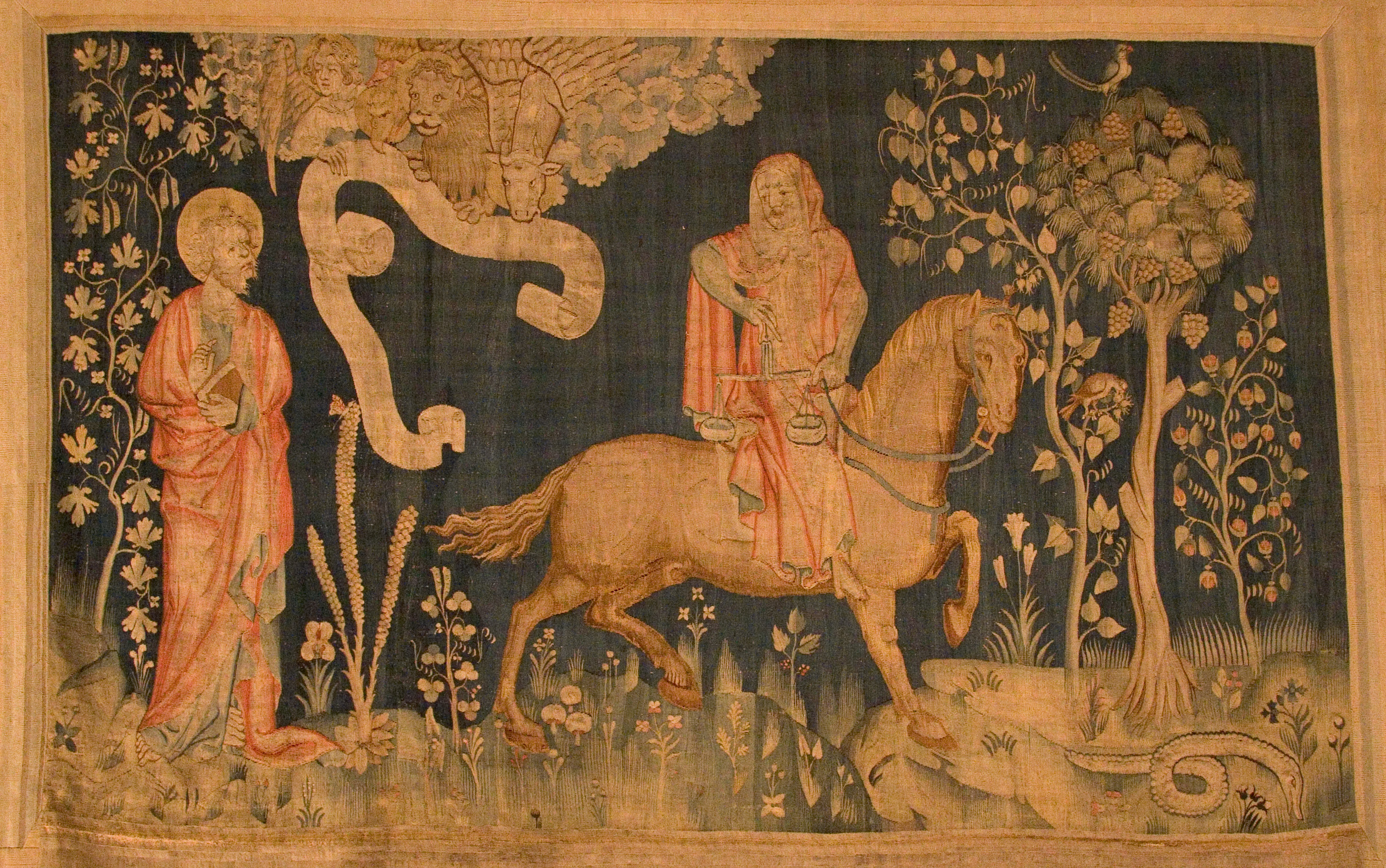
The third Horseman, Famine on the Black Horse, as depicted in the Angers Apocalypse Tapestry (1372–1382).

When He broke the third seal, I heard the third living creature saying, "Come". I looked, and behold, a black horse; and he who sat on it had a pair of scales in his hand. And I heard something like a voice in the center of the four living creatures saying, "A quart of wheat for a denarius, and three quarts of barley for a denarius; but do not damage the oil and the wine".

— Revelation 6:5–6 NASB

The third Horseman rides a black horse and is popularly understood to be Famine, as the Horseman carries a pair of balances or weighing scales (Greek ζυγόν, zugón), indicating the way that bread would have been weighed during a famine. The rider is typically portrayed as an emaciated man. Other authors interpret the third Horseman as the "Lord as a Law-Giver", holding Scales of Justice. In the passage, it is read that the indicated price of grain is about ten times normal (thus the famine interpretation popularity), with an entire day's wages (a denarius) buying enough wheat for only one person (one choenix, about 1.1 litres), or enough of the less nutritious barley for three, so that workers would struggle to feed their families. In the Gospels, the denarius is repeatedly mentioned as a monetary unit; for example, the denarius was the pay of a soldier for one day, and the day labor of a seasonal worker in the harvesting of grapes is also valued at one denarius (Matthew 20:2). Thus, it is possibly meant that with the approach of the Apocalypse, the most necessary food will rise in price greatly, and the wages earned per day will be enough only for the minimum subsistence for the same day and nothing more.

Of the Four Horsemen, the black horse and its rider are the only ones whose appearance is accompanied by vocalization. John hears a voice, unidentified but coming from among the four living creatures, that speaks of the prices of wheat and barley, saying, "and see thou hurt not the oil and the wine". This suggests that the black horse's famine is to drive up the price of grain but leave oil and wine supplies unaffected (though out of reach of the ordinary worker). One explanation is that grain crops would have been more naturally susceptible to famine years or locust plagues than olive trees and grapevines, which root more deeply.

The statement might also suggest a continuing abundance of luxuries for the wealthy, while staples, such as bread, are scarce, though not completely depleted; such selective scarcity may result from injustice and the deliberate production of luxury crops for the wealthy over grain, as would have happened during the time the Book of Revelation was written. Alternatively, the preservation of oil and wine could symbolize the preservation of the Christian faithful, who use oil and wine in their sacraments.

=== As imperial oppression ===
According to Edward Bishop Elliott's interpretation, through this third seal, the black horse is unleashed, representing aggravated distress and mourning. The balance in the rider's hand is not associated with a man weighing out bread for his family but with buying and selling corn and other grains. During the time of the apostle John's exile in Patmos, the balance was commonly a symbol of justice since it was used to weigh grains for a set price. The balance of justice held in the hand of the rider of the black horse signified the aggravation of the other previous evil, with the bloodstained red of the Roman aspect morphing into the darker blackness of distress. The black horse rider is instructed not to harm the oil and the wine, which signifies that this scarcity should not fall upon the superfluities, such as oil and wine, which men can live without, but upon the necessities of life—bread.

This interpretation also borrows from Edward Gibbon's The History of the Decline and Fall of the Roman Empire, which claims the Roman Empire suffered as a result of excessive taxation of its citizens, particularly during the reign of Emperor Caracalla, whom history has primarily remembered as a cruel tyrant and among the worst of the Roman emperors. Under the necessity of gratifying the greed and excessive lifestyle which Caracalla had excited in the army, old as well as new taxes, were at the same time levied in the provinces. The land tax, taxes for services, and heavy contributions of corn, wine, oil, and meat were exacted from the provinces for court, army, and capital use.

According to Gibbon, this was exacerbated by the rise to power of Emperor Maximin, who "attacked the public property at length". Every city of the empire was destined to purchase corn for the multitudes, as well as supply expenses for the games. By the Emperor's authority, the whole mass of wealth was confiscated for use by the Imperial treasury—temples "stripped of their most valuable offerings of gold, silver [and statues] which were melted down and coined into money".

== Pale Horse ==
The fourth Horseman, Death on the Pale Horse. Engraving by Gustave Doré (1865).

When the Lamb opened the fourth seal, I heard the voice of the fourth living creature say, "Come!" I looked, and there before me was a pale horse! Its rider was named Death, and Hades was following close behind him. They were given power over a fourth of the earth to kill by sword, famine and plague, and by the wild beasts of the earth.

— Revelation 6:7–8 (New International Version Bible)

The fourth and final Horseman is named Death (Greek: Θᾰ́νᾰτος, Thánatos, Latin: Mŏrs or Thanatus).

Death, known in Latin as Mŏrs and in Greek as Thánatos (Θᾰ́νᾰτος), of all the riders, he is the only one to whom the text itself explicitly gives a name. Unlike the other three, he is not described as carrying a weapon or other object, instead, he is followed by Hades (Greek: ᾍδης, Hā́idēs, latinized as Hādēs) despite not being the same concept as the Greek god and his abode in Greek mythology, but simply to the place of the dead in the Greek language, it was influenced by both as an intermediate realm (similar to the Asphodel Meadows) between Heaven (Ouranos) and Hell (Tartarus), like the Greek god was an intermediate between the other gods), and which is called Īnfernus ("[the] Underworld", a clipping of īnfernus lŏcus, "[the] lower place") in Latin. However, illustrations commonly depict him carrying a scythe, sword, or another implement; he is no different from typical portrayals of Death, and is the only horseman who does not appear to be a human.

The color of Death's horse is written as pàllidus in Latin and as χλωρός (khlōrós, latinized as chlōrus) in the original Koine Greek, which can mean either green/greenish-yellow or pale/pallid in both languages. The color is often translated as "pale", though "ashen", "pale green", and "yellowish green" are other possible interpretations (the Greek word is the root of "chlorophyll" and "chlorine"). Based on the uses of the word in ancient Greek medical literature, several scholars suggest that the color reflects the sickly pallor of a corpse. In some modern artistic depictions, the horse is distinctly green.

The verse beginning with "they were given power over a fourth of the Earth" is generally taken as referring to Death and Hades, although some commentators see it as applying to all four horsemen.

=== Destroying an empire ===
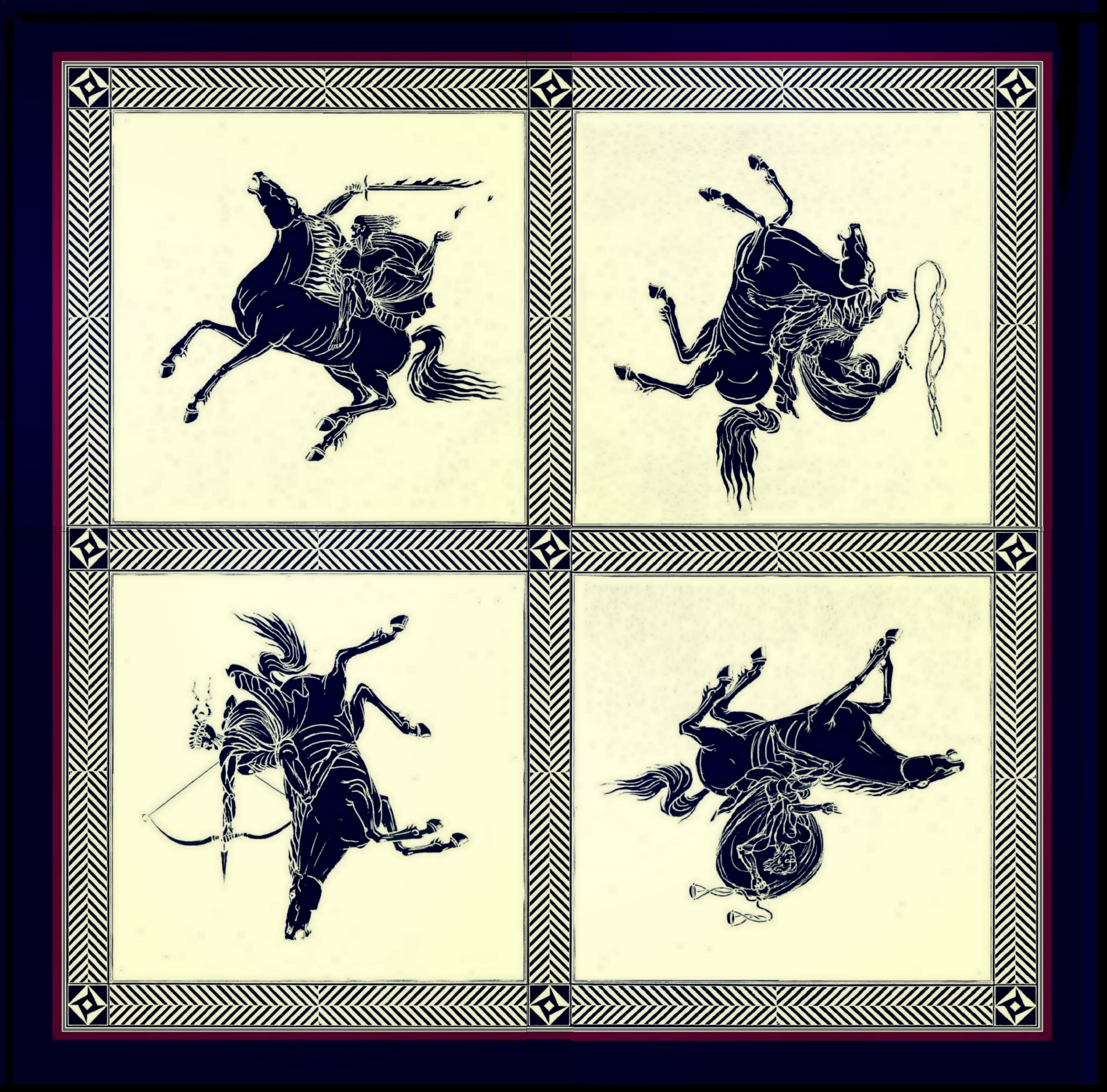
Four Horsemen of the Apocalypse (by Arnaldo dell'Ira, neo-Roman project of mosaic, 1939–1940).

This fourth, pale horse, was the personification of Death, with Hades following him, jaws open and receiving the victims slain by Death. Death's commission was to kill upon the Roman Earth with all of the four judgments of God—with sword, famine, pestilence, and wild beasts. The deadly pale and livid appearance displays a hue symptomatic of approaching empire dissolution. According to Edward Bishop Elliott, an era in Roman history commencing within about 15 years after the death of Severus Alexander (in AD 235) strongly marks every point of this terrible emblem.

Edward Gibbon speaks of a period from the celebration of the great secular games by the Emperor Philip to the death of Gallienus (in AD 268) as the 20 years of shame and misfortune, of confusion and calamity, as a time when the ruined empire approached the last and fatal moment of its dissolution. Every instant of time in every province of the Roman world was afflicted by military tyrants and barbarous invaders—the sword from within and without.

According to Elliott, famine, the inevitable consequence of carnage and oppression, which demolished the present crop as well as the hope of future harvests, produced the environment for an epidemic of diseases, the effects of scanty and unwholesome food. That furious plague (the Plague of Cyprian), which raged from 250 to 265, continued without interruption in every province, city and almost every family in the empire. During a portion of this time, 5000 people died daily in Rome; and many towns that had escaped the attacks of barbarians were entirely depopulated.

For a time in the late 260s, the strength of Aurelian crushed the enemies of Rome, yet after his assassination a certain amount of them revived. While the Goths had been destroyed for almost a century and the Empire reunited, the Sassanid Persians were uncowed in the East and, during the following year, hosts of central Asian Alani spread themselves over Pontus, Cappadocia, Cilicia, and Galatia, etching their course by the flames of cities and villages they pillaged.

As for the wild beasts of the Earth, according to Elliott, it is a well-known law of nature that they quickly occupy the scenes of waste and depopulation—where the reign of man fails and the reign of beasts begins. After the reign of Gallienus and 20 or 30 years had passed, the multiplication of the animals had risen to such an extent in parts of the empire that they made it a 'crying evil'.

One notable point of apparent difference between the prophecy and history might seem to be expressly limited to the fourth part of the Roman Earth, but in the history of the period, the devastation of the pale horse extended over all. The fourth seal prophecy seems to mark the malignant climax of the evils of the two preceding seals, to which no such limitation is attached. Turning to a reading in Jerome's Latin Vulgate which reads "over the four parts of the Earth", it requires that the Roman Empire should have some kind of quadripartition. Dividing from the central or Italian fourth, three great divisions of the Empire separated into the West, East, and Illyricum under Posthumus, Aureolus, and Zenobia respectively—divisions that were later legitimized by Diocletian.

Diocletian ended this long period of anarchy, but the succession of civil wars and invasions caused much suffering, disorder and crime, which brought the empire into a state of moral lethargy from which it never recovered. After the plague had abated, the empire suffered from general distress, and its condition was very much like that which followed after the Black Death of the Middle Ages. Talent and art had become extinct in proportion to the desolation of the world.

== Interpretations ==
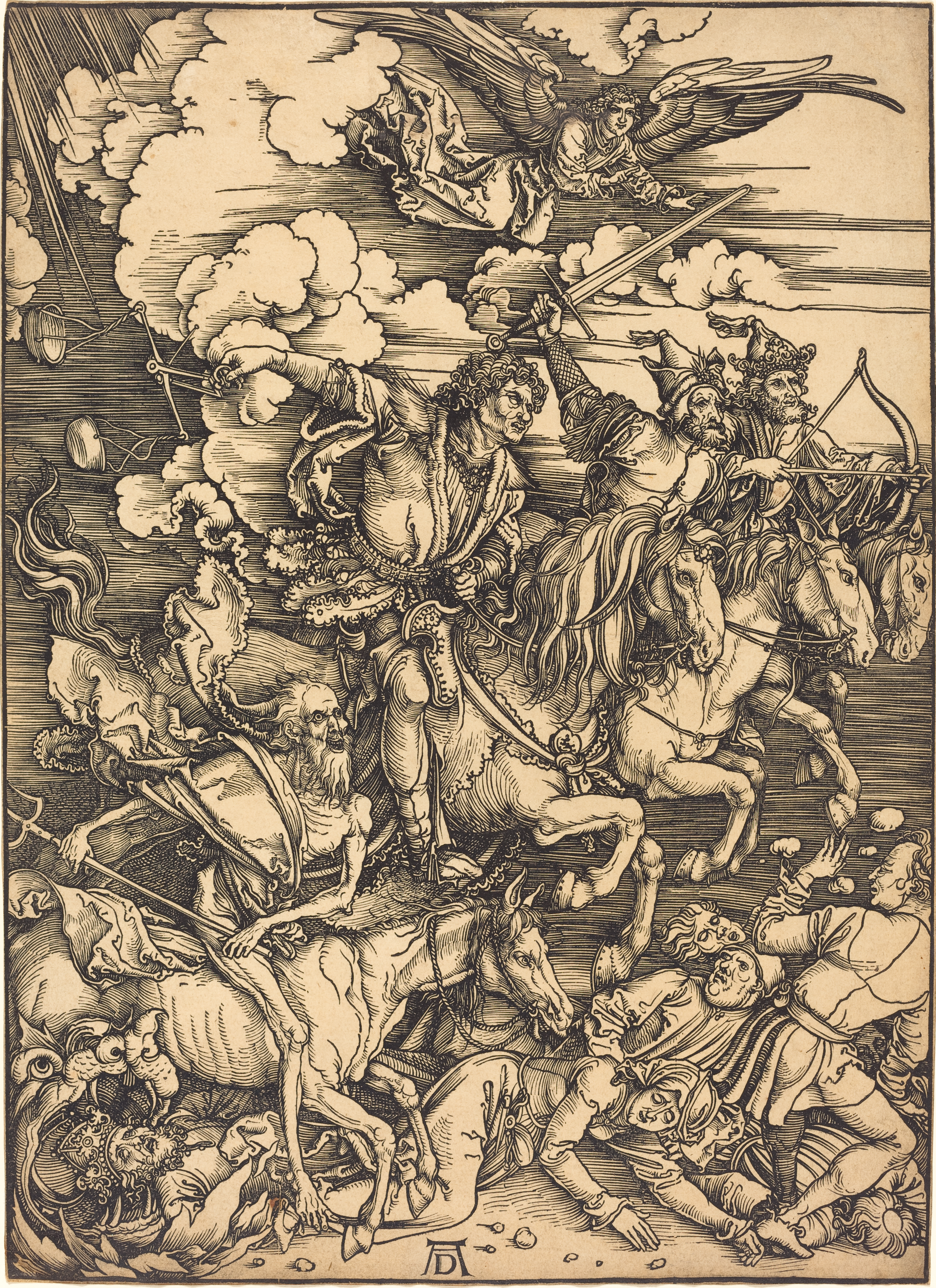
The Horsemen of the Apocalypse, in a woodcut by Albrecht Dürer (c. 1497–1498.), ride forth as a group, with an angel heralding them, to bring Death, Famine, War, and Conquest unto man.

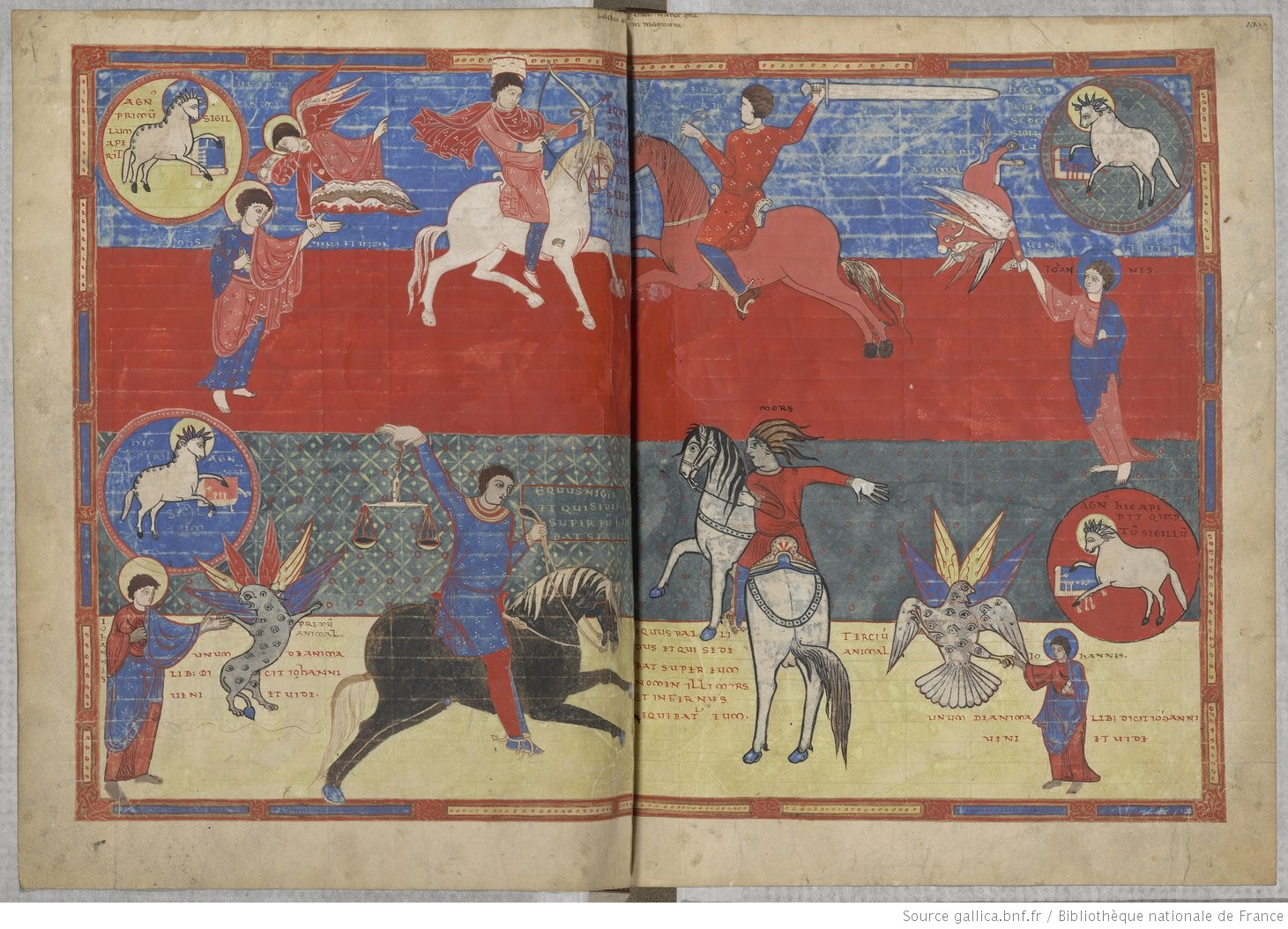
Four Horsemen of the Apocalypse, Saint-Sever Beatus, 11th century.

=== Christological interpretation ===
Before the Reformation and the woodcut by Albrecht Dürer, the usual and more influential commentaries of the Book of Revelation thought there was only one horseman riding successively these four horses, who was the Christ himself. So did some medieval illuminations, and after that some modern commentators: Oecumenius, a Greek exegete writing in the sixth century, Berengaudus a French Benedictine monk of Ferrières Abbey at the same period, Luis del Alcázar a Spanish Jesuit in 1612, Benito Arias Montano, a Spanish Orientalist, in 1622, Jacques de Bordes, a French capuchin in 1639, Emanuel Swedenborg a Swedish theologian in 1766.

=== Prophetic interpretation ===
Some Christians interpret the Horsemen as a prophecy of a future Tribulation, during which many on Earth will die as a result of multiple catastrophes. The Four Horsemen are the first in a series of "Seal" judgments. This is when God will judge the Earth, and is giving humans a chance to repent before they die. A new beautiful Earth is created for all the people who are faithful to Him and accept him as their Savior.

John Walvoord, a premillennialist, believed the Seals will be opened during the Great Tribulation and coincides with the arrival of the Antichrist as the first horseman, a global war as the second horseman, an economic collapse as the third horseman, and the general die-off of one quarter of the World's population as the fourth horseman; which is followed by a global dictatorship under the Antichrist and the rest of the plagues.

=== Historicist interpretation ===
According to E. B. Elliott, the first seal, as revealed to John by the angel, was to signify what was to happen soon after John seeing the visions in Patmos, and that the second, third, and fourth seals in like manner were to have commencing dates each in chronological sequence following the preceding seal. Its general subject is the decline and fall, after a previous prosperous era, of the Empire of Heathen Rome. The first four seals of Revelation, represented by four horses and horsemen, are fixed to events, or changes, within the Roman Earth.

=== Preterist interpretation ===
Some modern scholars interpret Revelation from a preterist point of view, arguing that its prophecy and imagery apply only to the events of the first century of Christian history. In this school of thought, Conquest, the white horse's rider, is sometimes identified as a symbol of Parthian forces: Conquest carries a bow, and the Parthian Empire was at that time known for its mounted warriors and their skill with bow and arrow. Parthians were also particularly associated with white horses. Some scholars specifically point to Vologases I, a Parthian shah who clashed with the Roman Empire and won one significant battle in AD 62.

Revelation's historical context may also influence the depiction of the black horse and its rider, Famine. In AD 92, the Roman emperor Domitian attempted to curb excessive growth of grapevines and encourage grain cultivation instead, but there was a major popular backlash against this effort, and it was abandoned. Famine's mission to make wheat and barley scarce but "hurt not the oil and the wine" could be an allusion to this episode. The red horse and its rider, who take peace from the Earth, might represent the prevalence of civil strife at the time Revelation was written; internecine conflict ran rampant in the Roman Empire during and just prior to the 1st century AD.

=== Latter-day Saint interpretation ===
Members of The Church of Jesus Christ of Latter-day Saints believe that Joseph Smith, revealed that the book described by John "contains the revealed will, mysteries, and the works of God; the hidden things of his economy concerning this Earth during the seven thousand years of its continuance, or its temporal existence" and that the seals describe these things for the seven thousand years of the Earth's temporal existence, each seal representing 1,000 years.

About the first seal and the white horse, LDS Apostle Bruce R. McConkie taught, "The most transcendent happenings involved Enoch and his ministry. What John saw was not the establishment of Zion and its removal to heavenly spheres, but the unparalleled wars in which Enoch, as a general over the armies of the saints, 'went forth conquering and to conquer' Revelation 6:2; see also Moses 7:13–18." The second seal and the red horse represent the period from approximately 3,000 BC to 2,000 BC, including the wickedness and violence leading to the Great Flood.

The third seal and black horse describe the period of ancient Joseph, son of Israel, who was sold into Egypt, and the famines that swept that period (see Genesis 41–42; Abraham 1:29–30; 2:1, 17, 21). The fourth seal and the pale horse are interpreted to represent the thousand years leading up to the birth of Jesus Christ, both the physical death brought about by great warring empires and the spiritual death through apostasy among the Lord's chosen people.

=== Other interpretations ===
Artwork which shows the Horsemen as a group, such as the famous woodcut by Albrecht Dürer, suggests an interpretation where all four horsemen represent different aspects of the same tribulation.

American Protestant Evangelical interpreters regularly see ways in which the horsemen, and Revelation in general, speak to contemporary events. Some who believe Revelation applies to modern times can interpret the horses based on the various ways their colors are used. Red, for example, often represents Communism, the white horse and rider with a crown representing Catholicism, Black has been used as a symbol of Capitalism, while Green represents the rise of Islam. Pastor Irvin Baxter Jr. of Endtime Ministries espoused such a belief.

Some equate the Four Horsemen with the angels of the four winds. (See Michael, Gabriel, Raphael, and Uriel, angels often associated with four cardinal directions).

Some speculate that when the imagery of the Seven Seals is compared to other eschatological descriptions throughout the Bible, the themes of the horsemen draw remarkable similarity to the events of the Olivet Discourse. The signs of the approaching end of the world are likened to birth pains, indicating that they would occur more frequently and with greater intensity the nearer the event of Christ's return. With this perspective the horsemen represent the rise of false religions, false prophets, and false messiahs; the increase of wars and rumors of wars; the escalation of natural disasters and famines; and the growth of persecution, martyrdom, betrayal, and loss of faith.

According to Anatoly Fomenko, a new chronologist, the Book of Revelation is largely astrological in nature. The 'Four Horsemen' represent the planets Mercury, Mars, Jupiter and Saturn.

== Other Biblical references ==
=== Zechariah ===
The Book of Zechariah twice mentions colored horses; in the first passage there are three colors (red, speckled/brown, and white), and in the second there are four teams of horses (red, black, white, and finally dappled/"grisled and bay") pulling chariots. The second set of horses are referred to as "the four spirits of heaven, going out from standing in the presence of the Lord of the whole world." They are described as patrolling the Earth and keeping it peaceful. It may be assumed by some Christian interpretations that when the tribulation begins, the peace is taken away, so their job is to terrify the places in which they patrol.

=== Ezekiel ===
The four living creatures of Revelation 4:6–8 are written similarly to the four living creatures in Ezekiel 1:5–12. In Revelation, each of the living creatures summons a horseman, where in Ezekiel the living creatures follow wherever the spirit leads, without turning.

In Ezekiel 14:21, the Lord enumerates His "four disastrous acts of judgment" (ESV), sword, famine, wild beasts, and pestilence, against the idolatrous elders of Israel. A symbolic interpretation of the Four Horsemen links the riders to these judgments, or the similar judgments in 6:11–12.

== See also ==
- The Book with Seven Seals
- Events of Revelation (Chapter 6)
- Four Horsemen of the Apocalypse in popular culture
- Four Horsemen of the Infocalypse, an analogous usage in the use of computers
- Kalki
- Four Perils
- The Fifth Horseman (disambiguation), several concepts adding to the four horsemen
