= Four Horsemen of the Apocalypse (painting) =

1887 painting by Viktor Vasnetsov

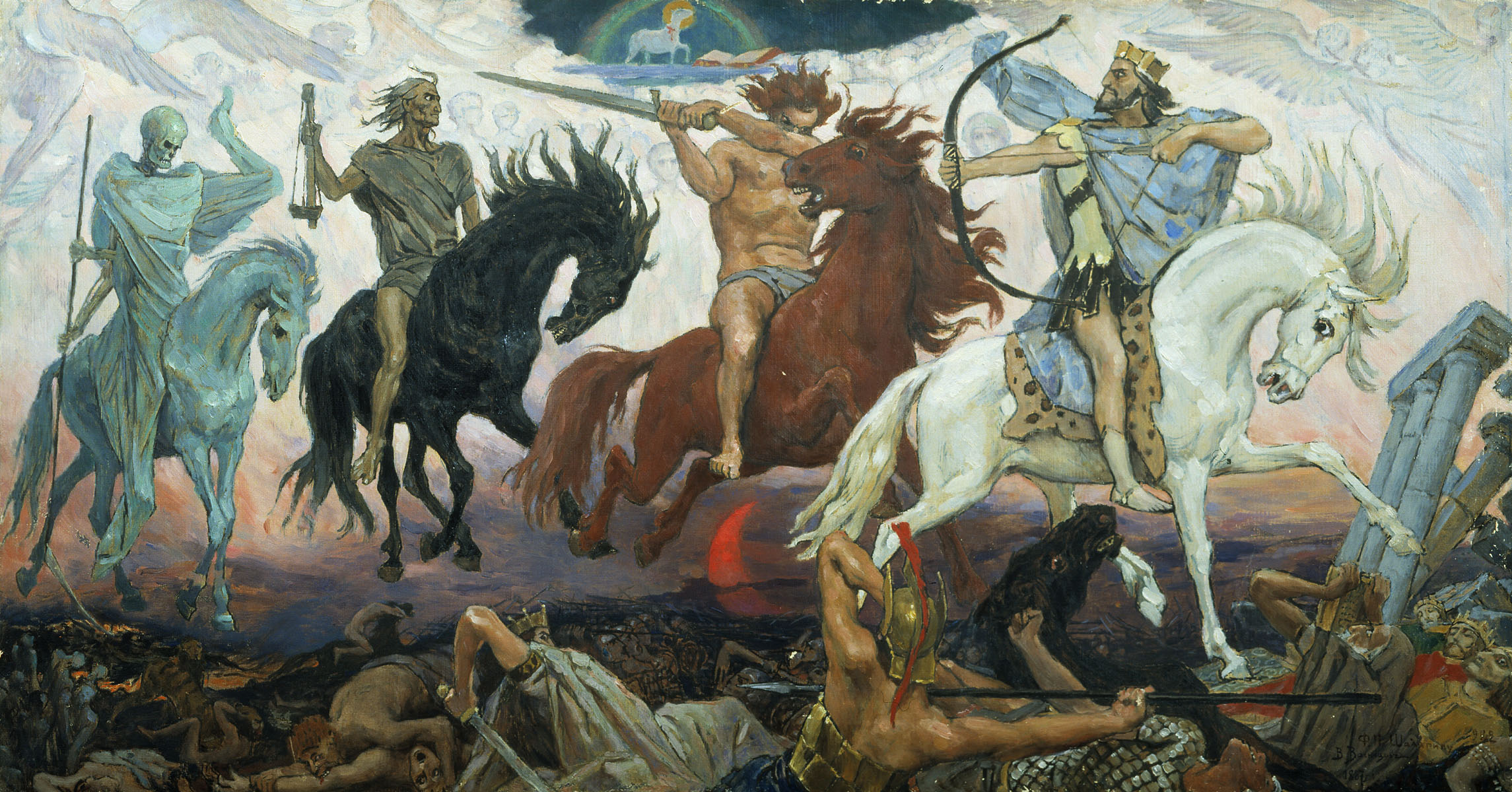
The Four Horsemen of the Apocalypse are depicted in the painting. Depicted from right to left are Conquest, War, Famine, and Death.

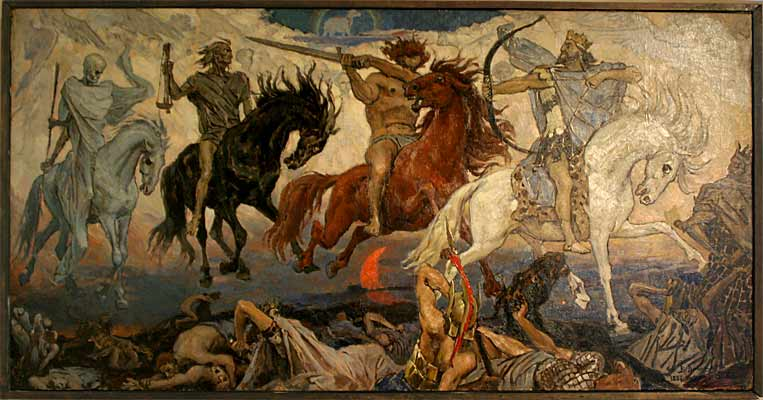
Study

Four Horsemen of the Apocalypse (Russian: "Воины Апокалипсиса") is an 1887 painting by Russian artist Viktor Vasnetsov.

The painting depicts the Four Horsemen of the Apocalypse described in the Book of Revelation. The Lamb of God is visible at the top.

It is an oil on canvas, measuring 72 by 136 centimetres (28 in × 54 in), and is held by the Glinka State Central Museum of Musical Culture in Moscow. A study is held by the State Museum of the History of Religion in St Petersburg.
