= Blart: The Boy Who Didn't Want to Save the World =

2006 novel by Dominic Barker

Blart: The Boy Who Didn't Want To Save The World
- First edition
- Author: Dominic Barker
- Cover artist: David Wyatt
- Language: English
- Genre: Children's
- Publisher: Bloomsbury
- Publication date: 2006
- Publication place: United Kingdom
- Pages: 320
- ISBN: 0-7475-8074-X
- OCLC: 62265410
- Followed by: Blart II: The Boy Who was Wanted Dead or Alive - Or Both

Blart: The Boy Who Didn't Want To Save The World is a comedy novel by Dominic Barker. It was published in 2006 by Bloomsbury Publishing Plc in Great Britain. It centers around Blart, a young boy living on a pig farm, who refuses to save the world. The book starts as a light-hearted parody of the fantasy genre but becomes darker as the book progresses. The book won the 2007 Stockton Children's Book of the Year Award.

== Plot summary ==
Blart is a young and unattractive boy, who lives on a small pig farm with his grandfather. Blart is primarily concerned with himself and his pigs. One day, Capablanca, a very proud and powerful wizard, arrives at the pig farm. He tells Blart that he is destined to save the world by destroying the great Zoltab. Blart refuses but is swept up from his home. He is sent on a perilous quest around the land where he fights the forces of evil. During his quest, meets many strange characters. The plot leads to one final confrontation with the evil Zoltab and his most powerful minions.

== Characters ==
=== Main characters ===
- Capablanca : A powerful, braggart wizard, Capablanca discovers Blart and forcibly takes him on his quest. His eyes are crystal-blue in color when he uses his magic. He has little patience for Blart and threatens him with use of his magic to coerce him.
- Blart: Blart begins the story as a 14-year-old illiterate pig farmer. Capablanca suddenly shows reveals to him that he is the only boy capable of saving the world from the second coming of the evil lord Zoltab. He at rejects this idea, but Capablanca coerces him to play along.
- Beowulf: Beowulf accompanies Blart and Capablanca on their quest. He wields a large sword and tries to prove himself worthy of knighthood. In the process, he often ends up in trouble, such as when he kills Princess Lois' pet dragon. He also enjoys singing, although he is not a talented singer. He constantly tells Blart he will cleave him into two. Despite his ignorance and weepiness, he is a great warrior and a significant helpt to Blart's quest.
- Pig the Horse: Pig is a flying horse who is captured by the party. Blart gives Pig its name. Capablanca rode the horse off a cliff to force it to learn to fly, nearly getting the party "splattered on rocks", to aid the company on their quest.
- Princess Lois: Princes Lois is the princess of Illyria. She is described as having flaming red hair and being rather aggressive by nature. She enjoys slamming doors and is adamant about never marrying. Her only friends are the dragons of Illyria, one of which Beowulf kills. She joins the group to see the world. Blart shows feelings towards her, who both are characterized by rude dispositions.
- Tungsten': Tungsten is dwarf warrior from beneath the ground and becomes a member of the company. He is a brave warrior who wields a mallet. He is the Ambassador of the Iron Mines. His only wish is for iron to become the most valuable metal, then his tribe would rule the silver and gold mines as well.
- Zoltab: One of the seven lords of the earth, he betrayed the others in order to take over the world. He was locked away in the Great Tunnel of Despair after his eventual defeat. However, the cult of Zoltab conspire to free him. He pursues Princess Lois, wanting to have children was to extend the Zoltab bloodline. In the end, he fails in his plot to conquer the world and marry Princess Lois. He is splattered with the blood of Blart's brother.
- Famine, Disease, Pestilence, and Death : These four warriors are The Four Horsemen of Zoltab. Each spreads its eponymous effects. They wield separate weapons, each horrible in their own way. Famine is described as tall and gaunt with skin stretched tautly over his bones and wields a spear. Disease is covered in sores and boils with yellow pus flowing from scabs on his face. Black bile also flows from his nose, and he carries a mace. Pestilence is surrounded by a swarm of wasps and mosquitoes, each with their own poisonous stings. He is armed with a trident and a net. Death, the most deadly and powerful, is simply a skeleton on a horse. He grins evilly while wielding a large sword. Touching Death's sword and bone results in instant death.
- The Master : The Master is Zoltab's number two. He is almost as equally powerful as Zoltab, striking fear into people's hearts. The Master hides a terrible secret.

=== Minor characters ===
- Wattle and Daub: Wattle and Daub are the prized pigs of Blart's grandfather. They are Blart's best and only friends in the beginning of the book. When Blart is parted from them, they are killed and sliced.
- The Landlord: The Landlord is the new, mysterious landlord of the Jolly Murderers Inn. He is secretly a minion of Zoltab. He, along with a band of other Minions, attack the company in their rooms. When defeated, the Landlord severs his own tongue off, refusing to divulge any information.
- Mr. Cheery: The real owner of the Jolly Murderers Inn. He is locked up in his own inn by Zoltab's minion.
- Nimzovitsch: A powerful wizard and friend of Capablanca. The company visits him for information on Zoltab. They find him covered and trapped in goo, an outcome of a stew he attempted to make.
- Mr. Motte and Mr. Bailey: These are the two definite Minions of Zoltab. They get Beowulf drunk in order to extract information from him on the company's quest.
- The Dragons of Illyria: The five dragons of Illyria (one blue, one red, one black, one green and one multicoloured) are the only friends of Princess Lois. Beowulf, in his pursuit of knighthood, severs the tail of the multicoloured one, killing it.
- The King and Queen of Illyria: They are the rulers of Illyria. Illyria is described as a stereotypical paradise. In the book, a beggar was said to attempt to beg in Illyria. This beggar finds that he had become the third richest man in Illyria the second day and, therefore, had to retire. The two are equally nice and refuse to believe that anything is truly bad, refraining from using words such as "war," "accusation," and "crime." They suggest giving Zoltab and his minions with fruits or a counselling session to solve the questor's problem. Their palace is the location of the map to the Great Tunnel of Despair.
- The Clerk: The sour-looking clerk of Illyria is secretly a Minion of Zoltab. He dispatches information to Zoltab from the palace of Illyria. He holds the key to the room containing the map to the Great Tunnel of Despair. When found out, he, like the landlord, severs his own tongue off.
- Acrid: Acrid is a female dwarf. She is crushed and killed underneath Blart when he falls into the dwarf mines.
- Yucky: The angry father of the late Acrid, he attempts to kill Blart. Seconds before his attack on Blart, he is crushed and killed by a falling Capablanca.
- Porg: Porg is a dwarf advisor to Emperor Squat. He captures Blart and Capablanca and takes them to see the emperor. He is nervous and fears the mere name of Zoltab.
- Emperor Squat: Squat is the dwarf emperor of the Iron Mines. He is often referred to as "your bulkiness." He sentences Blart and Capablanca to death without trial when Blart makes fun of his short stature.
- The Chief: The Chief is in charge of those digging to free Zoltab. When Blart and Capablanca are captured and sent to work, the current chief is a large, burly man with a whip. He is killed by The Master when the expected amount of daily work is not completed. Blart is then selected to become the new chief. The work ends abruptly afterwards.
- Maroczy: Maroczy is a Minister of Zoltab. He, along with The Master, foresees the return of Zoltab.
- Blart's brother: The actual chosen one, it was he who was destined to kill Zoltab. However, he had already sworn his allegiance to Zoltab. He is killed when one of Zoltab's soldiers magically transforms into a dragon and crushes him.

== Sequels ==
A sequel entitled Blart II: The Boy Who was Wanted Dead or Alive - Or Both was released in the United States and the UK in 2007. A third volume entitled Blart III: The Boy Who Set Sail on a Questionable Quest was published in 2008.

== Reception ==
The novel was generally well received. The Guardian praised it as being "inventive, charming and very funny" with a "satisfying ending." The Dominion Post said it had "some truly laughable scenes." The Birmingham Post noted that it would appeal to young Terry Pratchett fans. The Times chose it as one of their Top Easter Reads, describing it as "hilarious."
