= Marcin Kitz =

Polish-Jewish painter (1891–1943)

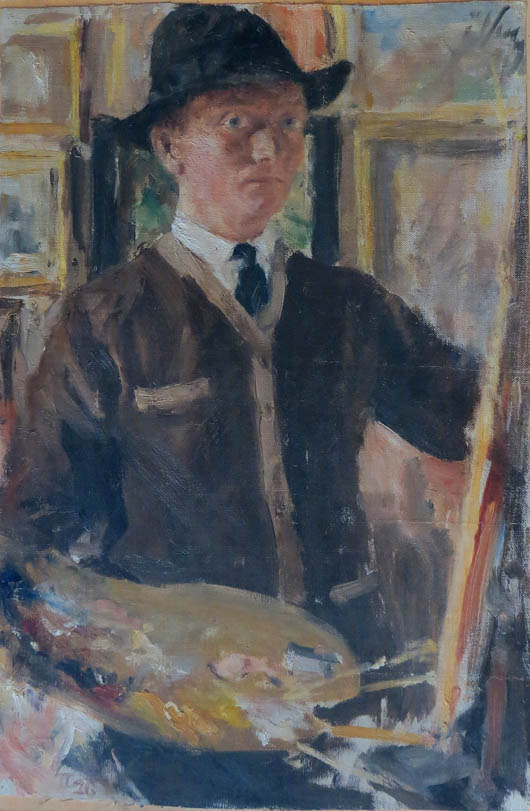
Self-portrait 1926

Marcin Kitz (1891–1943) was a Polish-Jewish painter.

Marcin Kitz started his painting studies in Lwów at Stanisław Rejchan and Stanisław Batowski Kaczor, 1919/1920 at Jan Matejko Academy of Fine Arts in Kraków, he studied also in Berlin, Munich and Vienna. Since 1923 he participated on the painting salons in Kraków, Lwów, Poznań and Warsaw. 1939-1941 he lived in Moscow, Kharkiv and Kiev.

He painted landscapes, still-life and genre images and portraits.

In 1943 was arrested and murdered by Gestapo during the German occupation of Lwów because he helped to give concealment to the Jews.

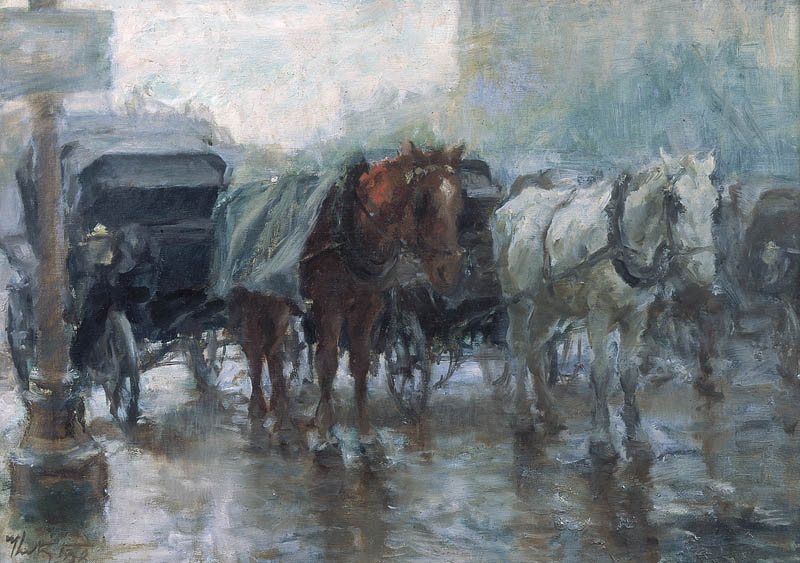
Cabs

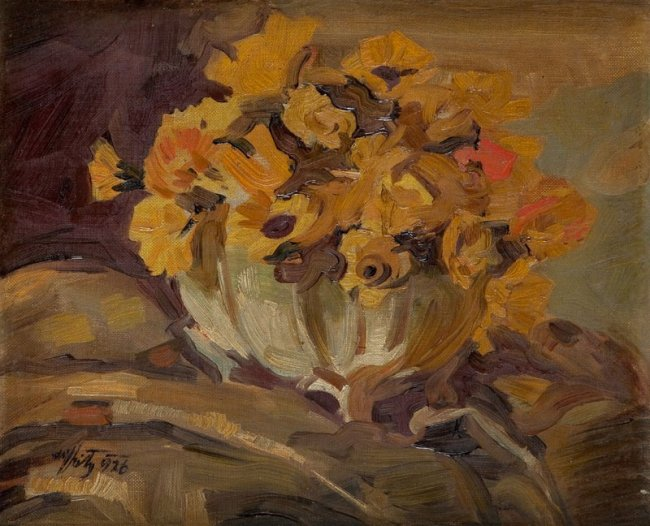
Flowers

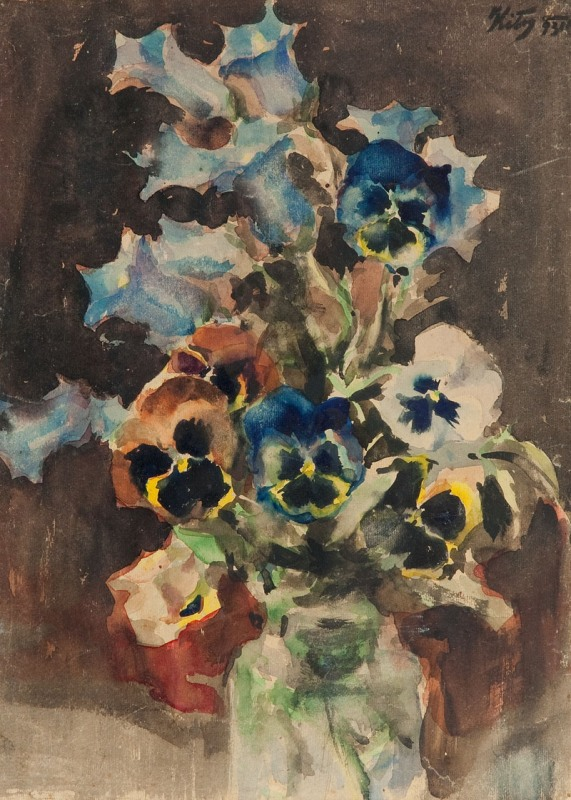
Flowers in a vase

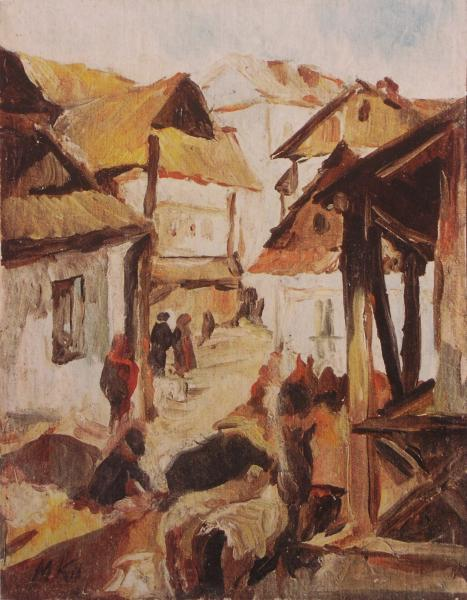
Little town
