= The Four Horsemen of the Apocalypse (novel) =

1916 novel

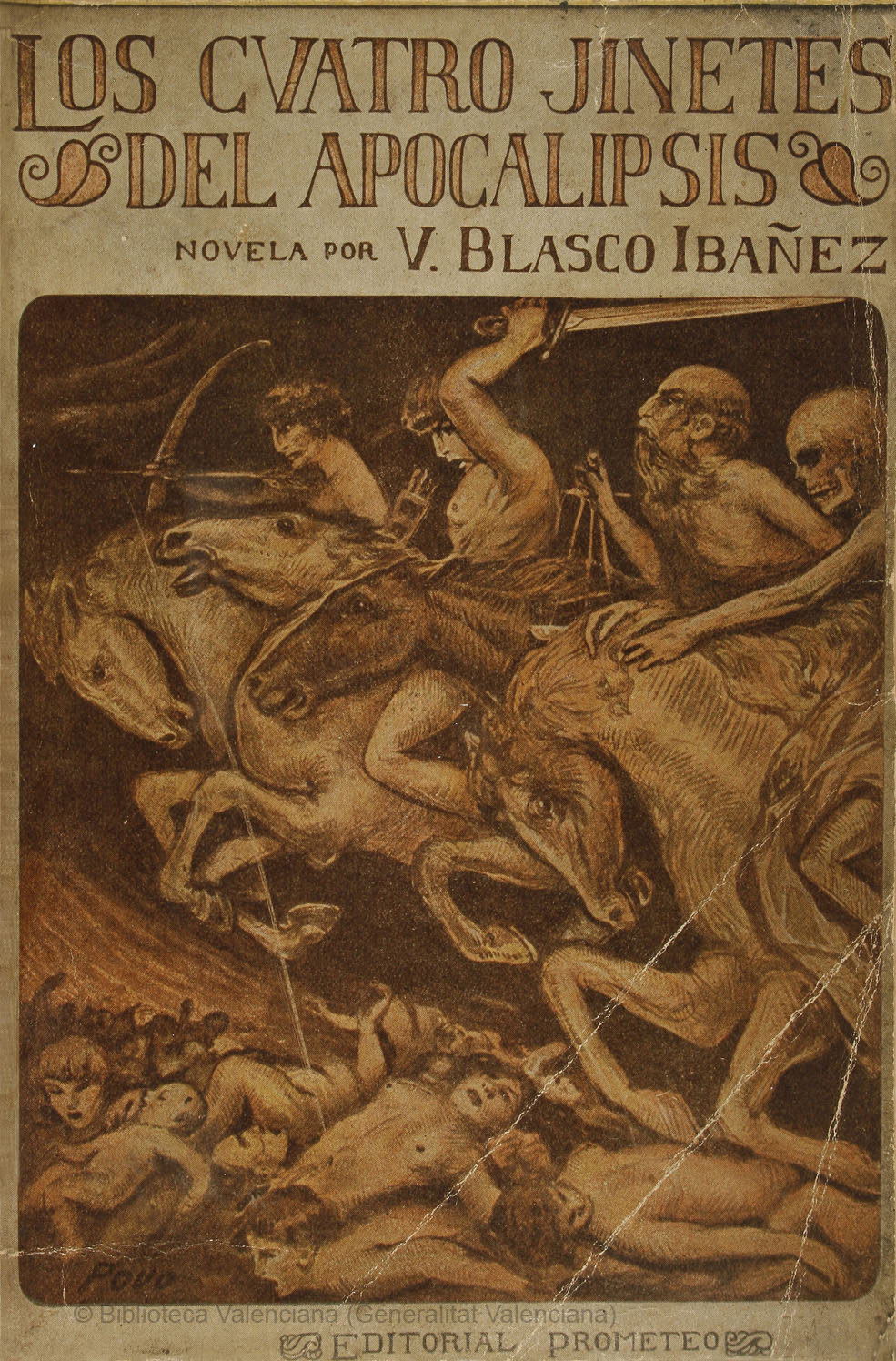
Front cover of a 1925 Spanish edition of the novel

The Four Horsemen of The Apocalypse (Spanish: Los cuatro jinetes del Apocalipsis) is a novel by the Spanish author Vicente Blasco Ibáñez. First published in 1916, it tells a tangled tale of the French and German sons-in-law of an Argentinian landowner who find themselves fighting on opposite sides during the First World War. Its 1918 English translation by Charlotte Brewster Jordan became the best-selling novel in the US in 1919 according to Publishers Weekly, which hailed it as "a superbly human story told by a genius." The novel was included in the list of 100 best novels of the 20th century by the Spanish newspaper El Mundo.

== Summary ==
A Frenchman, Marcelo Desnoyers, travels to Argentina in 1870 and marries the elder daughter of Julio Madariaga, the owner of a ranch. Eventually, Marcelo; his wife; and his children, Julio and Chichi, move back to France and live in a mansion in Paris. Julio turns out to be a spoiled lazy young man who avoids commitments and flirts with a married woman, Marguerite Laurier.

Meanwhile, Madariaga's younger daughter has married a German man, Karl Hartrott, and the Hartrotts move back to Germany. The Desnoyers family and the Hartrott family are thus set against each other with the onset of the First World War. However, Julio Desnoyers initially shows no interest in the war, but Hartrott's family eagerly supports the German cause. It is only after Julio's lover, Marguerite, lavishes attention upon her husband after the latter is wounded in battle that Julio is moved to participate in the war.

While the young Julio serves as a soldier, the aging Marcelo leaves the shelter and returns to his mansion, where he watches the German soldiers advance and eventually plunder his belongings and eat his food. At last, the French soldiers push back the German soldiers, and Marcelo chooses to defend a German man who spared Marcelo's life.

Julio Desnoyers returns to his family after he was wounded in a battle but praised for his valour, and he quickly sets out again to continue fighting. At the close of the war, Julio is killed in battle. The novel ends with Marcelo at his son's grave; he regrets that if his daughter, Chichi, has any children, they will not bear the name "Desnoyers." Marcelo finds that Hartrott also has lost a son in the war.

== The "Four Horsemen" ==
The allegorical reference to the Four Horsemen of the Apocalypse is stated by "Tchernoff," a man occupying one of the rooms of the apartment building in which Julio resides. Tchernoff is "a Russian or Pole who almost always returned with a package of books, and passed many hours writing near the patio window" (in spite of the initial ambiguity as to his nationality, he is thereafter described as a Russian and a Socialist).

At the end of Part I, as Tchernoff, Julio Desnoyers, and their friend Argensola watch the French soldiers leave for battle, the inebriated Tchernoff begins a wild monologue:

Suddenly he leaped from thought to word without any forewarning, continuing aloud the course of his reasoning.

"And when the sun arises in a few hours, the world will see coursing through its fields the four horsemen, enemies of mankind.... Already their wild steeds are pawing the ground with impatience; already the ill-omened riders have come together and are exchanging the last words before leaping into the saddle."

Tchernoff goes on to describe the beast of the Apocalypse and then the four horsemen who precede it: Plague (or Conquest), War, Famine, and Death.

Part I ends with the statement, "The agony of humanity, under the brutal sweep of the four horsemen, was already begun!"

At the end of the novel, when Marcelo Desnoyers is at the grave of his son Julio, Desnoyers has come to believe that "there was no justice; the world was ruled by blind chance," and he has a vision of the four horsemen, threatening to trample the earth once more: "All the rest was a dream. The four horsemen were the reality..."

== Adaptations ==
The novel was made into a Hollywood film in 1921, starring Rudolph Valentino, and again in 1962. The 1962 film takes place during the Second World War, rather than the First World War.
