= The Four Horsemen of the Apocalypse (1962 film) =

1962 film directed by Vincente Minnelli

The 4 Horsemen of the Apocalypse
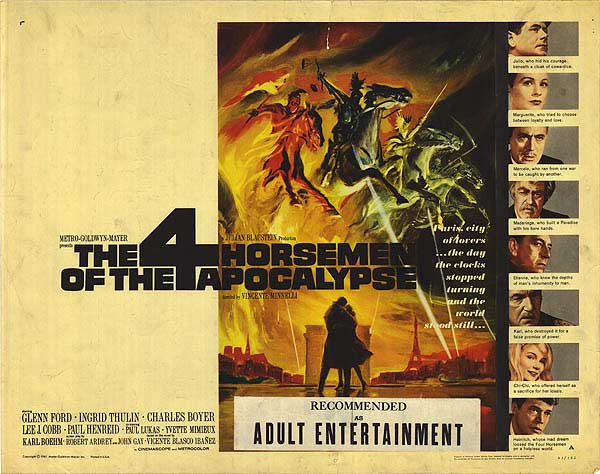
- Theatrical release poster by Reynold Brown
- Directed by: Vincente Minnelli
- Written by: Robert Ardrey; John Gay
- Based on: The Four Horsemen of the Apocalypse; 1916 novel by Vicente Blasco Ibáñez
- Produced by: Julian Blaustein
- Starring: Glenn Ford; Paul Henreid; Ingrid Thulin; Charles Boyer; Lee J. Cobb
- Cinematography: Milton Krasner
- Edited by: Ben Lewis; Adrienne Fazan
- Music by: André Previn
- Production companies: Metro-Goldwyn-Mayer; Moctezuma Films; Olallo Rubio
- Distributed by: Metro-Goldwyn-Mayer
- Release dates: February 7, 1962 (Washington, D.C.)
- Running time: 153 minutes
- Country: United States
- Language: English
- Budget: $7,174,000
- Box office: $9,183,673

The Four Horsemen of the Apocalypse is a 1962 American drama film directed by Vincente Minnelli and starring Glenn Ford, Ingrid Thulin, Charles Boyer, Lee J. Cobb, Paul Lukas, Yvette Mimieux, Karl Boehm and Paul Henreid. It is loosely based on the 1916 novel by Vicente Blasco Ibáñez, which had previously been adapted to film in 1921 with Rudolph Valentino. Unlike the first film, it was a critical and commercial disaster, which contributed greatly to the financial problems of MGM.

It was one of several very expensive films made by MGM in the early 1960s following the success of Ben-Hur.

== Plot ==
In 1938, Madariaga is the 80-year-old patriarch of a cattle ranch in Argentina. His two grandsons are Julio, whose father Marcelo is French, and Heinrich, whose father Karl is German. When Heinrich returns home from studying in Germany to reveal he has become a Nazi, Madariaga slaps him and predicts that the Four Horsemen of the Apocalypse (Conquest, War, Pestilence, and Death) will soon devastate the earth. He runs outside into a storm sees visions of the four horsemen and then dies in Julio's arms.

In 1938, Julio goes to Paris with his family and befriends Marcelo's anti-Nazi friend Etienne Laurier. Julio falls in love with Laurier's wife, Marguerite, and becomes her lover after war breaks out and Laurier is sent to a prisoner-of-war camp. He takes advantage of his status as a neutral to live a pleasant life with Marguerite in German-occupied Paris, where his cousin Heinrich is an important official in the SS and his uncle Karl a general in the Wehrmacht. When Marguerite becomes the object of German General von Kleig's lust, Julio—aided by Heinrich (it being the last time they are on good terms)—defies him and incurs his personal enmity. Julio's younger sister Chi Chi becomes active in the French resistance and makes Julio uncomfortable about his own neutrality. Laurier is released from prison an apparently broken man, and Marguerite leaves Julio to care for him. When Julio discovers that Laurier is an important figure in the resistance, he joins as well.

Eventually, both Chi Chi and Laurier are tortured and murdered by the Gestapo, and Laurier reveals to von Kleig that Julio is working for the resistance and on an important mission: guiding Allied bombers to destroy a Nazi headquarters in Normandy. Heinrich, realizing that Julio is probably a French agent, captures him just as the bombs are falling on them and kill both.

The final scene is missing from several versions shown. In it, the grandchildren's parents listen helplessly on the telephone as the deaths happen. The final words are from one set of parents to another: "Our children have killed each other." In other prints, the film ends with the four horsemen riding on to create future havoc for other generations.

== Cast ==
- Glenn Ford as Julio Desnoyers
- Ingrid Thulin as Marguerite Laurier
- Charles Boyer as Marcelo Desnoyers
- Yvette Mimieux as Chi-Chi
- Lee J. Cobb as Madariaga
- Paul Henreid as Etienne Laurier
- Karl Boehm as Heinrich von Hartrott
- Paul Lukas as Karl von Hartrott
- Nestor Paiva as Miguel
- Harriet MacGibbon as Doña Luisa Desnoyers
- Kathryn Givney as Elena von Hartrott
- Marcel Hillaire as Armand Dibie
- George Dolenz as General von Kleig
- Stephen Bekassy as Colonel Kleinsdorf
- Albert Rémy as François

== Production ==
=== Development ===
The silent film rights to Vicente Blasco-Ibañez's novel had been purchased by Metro Pictures in 1918 for $190,000 (equivalent to $4,066,925 in 2025). By 1946, there had been discussions by MGM about remaking the film before the American copyright expired. The following year, MGM producer Samuel Marx announced the studio was considering a remake as a vehicle for Ricardo Montalbán, and if they did, the story would be updated to World War II.

Early in 1958, MGM set about clarifying the copyright situation. It had recently authorized a widescreen remake of Ben-Hur, which became the highest-grossing film of 1959, and it was looking for older studio properties to remake. It obtained the necessary rights and in June 1958, they announced the remake was in active development. Julian Blaustein was assigned as producer.

=== Writing ===
"The driving force of the book is of love among men instead of hatred. I don't think it can be said often enough that such love is indispensable for all of us if we are to have any future. If a motion picture can dramatize such a theme entertainingly then the motion picture may make a small contribution to peace in the world. It certainly impresses me as being worth the try....

The Paris of the occupation, the births of the resistance movements have never been thoroughly explored on the screen to my mind. I'm not interested in trying to recreate the shooting war. That's almost too difficult to realistically do on the screen today. What I want to put on screen is the atmosphere, so that when you sit in the theatre you will feel the hope and frustration of people struggling against invasion and may realize no man is an island."

— Julian Blaustein, on updating the time setting from World War I to World War II

Kenneth MacKenna approached novelist Graham Greene to write a "rather free treatment" for the remake, but Greene declined. Robert Ardrey was then hired to write the first script. As mandated by the studio, Ardrey recharacterized the lead character Julio Desnoyers as a French-Argentine living in Paris. Following a publicity tour for his film Home from the Hill (1960), Vincente Minnelli was informed he had been selected to direct the film. In his memoir I Remember It Well, he held doubts about relocating the time period and wanted it set back in World War I, but Sol C. Siegel, MGM's head of production, was insistent.

Minnelli later claimed the production was being rushed before he was ready as MGM had established a start date. He did convince Siegel to have the script rewritten in order to reflect the Nazi occupation of Paris. Because Ardrey was preoccupied with another project, John Gay was hired to rewrite the script based on an outline as prepared by Minnelli. "Gay proved to be an enormous help," Minnelli later wrote. "The script – with the dreadful World War II setting – took shape. But I never justified the updating in my mind." Following Glenn Ford's casting, Ardrey was rehired for a two-week rewrite. Before filming was to start, Minnelli requested Terence Rattigan to rewrite the script but he declined, as did Irwin Shaw.

=== Casting ===
Early into development, Blaustein had considered Dirk Bogarde, who had made his Hollywood debut in Song Without End (1960). Other contenders included MGM contract actor George Hamilton, and Maximilian Schell. Meanwhile, Minnelli had wanted Alain Delon for the lead role and met with him while vacationing in Rome. However, MGM did not feel that he was well enough known. German actor Horst Buchholz was another candidate but was turned down for the same reason. In June 1960, it was announced that Glenn Ford, who had recently signed a new contract with MGM, would play the lead role. Minnelli was unhappy with the decision, writing he was stuck with "a leading actor who lacked the brashness and impulsiveness I associated with his part. I wanted new challenges but I didn't think they'd be that challenging."

However, Minnelli stated the rest of the cast "was as brilliant as it was international." Yvette Mimieux was cast in the ingenue part while Charles Boyer, Paul Henreid, and Lee J. Cobb were cast in key supporting roles. By August 1960, Ava Gardner was cast in the female lead, the part played by Alice Terry in the 1921 film. Eventually Gardner dropped out and Swedish actress Ingrid Thulin, best known for Wild Strawberries (1957), stepped in. Although not chosen for the lead role, Horst Buchholz was considered for the young German son but Karlheinz Böhm was hired instead.

=== Filming ===
Principal photography began in Paris on October 17, 1960. By this time, French regulations had required that every person in any building used for filming sign a letter of consent. For the duration of production, most of the film was shot on Sundays so the actual streets would be relatively clear and free of traffic congestion. As production continued, Minnelli was preparing to shoot scenes of the German Wehrmacht marching into the Champs-Élysées. However, the French police denied the production a filming permit. Minnelli then moved to film the Resistance battle scenes near the vicinity of the Sorbonne. Once more, the French police denied the production a permit to film there. To expedite the production, MGM tried to convince Minnelli to allow the second unit to film these sequences. Minnelli was insistent on filming these sequences, and completed filming near the Arc de Triomphe and the Place de la Concorde. By December 1960, Minnelli had spent eight weeks filming on location, with two-thirds of the film left to shoot. The budget had arisen to $6.5 million; concerned with the escalating costs, Siegel ordered for the production to return to Culver City, California. After a five-day hiatus, filming resumed in California on December 6 and continued until late March 1961.

Saul Bass spent months in 1961, creating four historical newsreel montages, "Sports Palace," "Warsaw," "Rotterdam," "La Martinique," which were to be interspersed throughout the film. Except for brief shots, the montages were removed from the final cut. Bass reused some of the edits for The Victors (1963) for which he designed the prologue and titles.

One of the most famous scenes of the 1921 film involved Rudolph Valentino dancing the tango. However the scene was not in the novel, and it was decided not to have a similar scene in the remake.

In 1964, Ingrid Thulin reflected on her time during the production:

It was an interesting experience. I could not conform to their standards of beauty. I tried.... After the first few rushes it was obvious that it [the film] would turn out badly. Yet they went right on. Perhaps they couldn't convince themselves that all that money would end in disaster. I really did want to be as beautiful as they wanted. It was terribly difficult. Then I worked very hard to dub the dialogue but they kept changing lines to things I couldn't pronounce. So they had to dub in another voice.

=== Post-production ===
Although the film was set to premiere in December 1961, Minnelli reshot portions of the film, including the Nazi entrance into Paris, from May to July 1961. He had also shot footage of the Four Horsemen—Conquest, War, Pestilence, and Death—in studio. Minnelli hired Tony Duquette to design the armory for the figures, and he spent two weeks filming the quartet on horseback galloping on parallel treadmills with surrounding smoke and colored lights. Minnelli used red as "a dominating color, culminating in a red gel over the newsreels, which would be shown in a documentary way to point up the devastation of the war and the insensitivity of the principal actors in taking scant notice of it." Filming was completed by August 1961.

Two months later, in October, MGM scheduled a sneak preview in Santa Barbara, California where it received negative audience scores. Alex North's instrumental score was discarded, and André Previn was hired to compose a new score. Although Ingrid Thulin spoke English well, her vocal tracks were considered monotonously uninflected and she was dubbed by Angela Lansbury. Two more months were spent re-editing the film, and the film's final production budget totaled $7,590,775.

By January 1962, Siegel tendered his resignation as head of production with more than two years left on his contract. Siegel's tenure had been marred by massive cost overruns of Four Horsemen of Apocalypse and Lady L, which had been postponed, and the remake of Mutiny on the Bounty (1962), as well as the commercial failure of Cimarron (1960).

== Reception ==
The Four Horsemen of the Apocalypse held its world premiere on February 7, 1962, at Loew's Capitol Theatre in Washington, D.C.

=== Box office ===
The film grossed $26,000 during its first week in Washington, D.C. By April 1962, MGM had become aware the film would not recoup its production cost and started to write off its losses. By the next month, MGM had written off $3 million on the film.

Ultimately, the film earned $1,600,000 in theatrical rentals in the United States and Canada and $2,500,000 overseas. When the costs of prints and advertising were added, MGM recorded a loss of $5,853,000.

=== Critical reaction ===
Bosley Crowther of The New York Times unfavorably compared the film to the 1921 version, and criticized the production values and the script. He was further critical of the casting, writing, Ford "is about as convincingly Argentine and possessed of urbanity as a high-school football coach from Kansas who has never been out of the state. And in his romantic scenes with Ingrid Thulin, who plays the wayward wife, he is aggressively flat and solemn. In short, he is just plain dull." A review in Time magazine felt "[t]he tale is trite, the script clumsy, and the camera work grossly faked." They felt only Boyer was appropriately cast, while Ford "portrays his Argentine as a sort of Fisk Tire Baby with sideburns".

Philip K. Scheuer of the Los Angeles Times wrote the filmmakers "have pulled it off. The new 'Four Horsemen of the Apocalypse' restores the pleasure there can be in seeing a good story well told on the screen." Variety felt the filmmakers "have fashioned a remake of this epic romantic saga that is rich in cinematic invention, photographic imagery and uncompromising production values." However, they were critical of the romantic subplot and felt "Ford's performance is without warmth, without passion, without magnetism. Warmth is also missing in the performance of Ingrid Thulin." Harrison's Reports called the film "very good", describing it as "[a]n enduring achievement of story telling reaches its true greatness only when it has been given the test of time itself."

Minnelli wrote the film received better reception in Europe and it influenced the look of The Damned (1969), The Conformist (1970) and The Garden of the Finzi Continis (1970). The Italian newspaper Il Tempo wrote the film was "a picture which has a sure hold on audiences...scenes of exquisite beauty. Paris is evoked with a palette of colors." The Paris edition of the New York Herald Tribune wrote the film "is a commendable achievement."

== Soundtrack ==
André Previn composed the soundtrack score, the main theme of which Alan and Marilyn Bergman later adapted and wrote lyrics for. The resulting song, "More in Love with You", was recorded by Barbra Streisand for The Movie Album (2003).

== Comic book adaptation ==
- Dell Four Color #1250 (1961)
