= Charlotte Brewster Jordan =

American writer and translator

Charlotte Brewster Jordan (1862 – 10 December, 1945) was an American writer and translator, best known for her authorized translation of Vicente Blasco Ibañez's Four Horsemen of The Apocalypse, which was one of the best-selling novels of the early 20th century.
