= Jesus H. Christ and the Four Hornsmen of the Apocalypse =

- Origin: New York City
- Genres: Power pop
- Years active: 2003-present
- Members: Mike Boschen; Wayne DuMaine; Risa Mickenberg; Stan Mitchell; Chris Olness; Tim Schadt; Joel Shelton; Will Shelton
- Past members: Ray Grappone

Jesus H. Christ and the Four Hornsmen of the Apocalypse is an eight-piece power pop band from New York City, known for their humorous, adult-oriented lyrics. The band consists of lead singer and writer Risa Mickenberg, guitarist Joel Shelton, his brother, bassist Will Shelton, drummer Stan Mitchell, and, as their name suggests, four horn players. The band's horn players, who perform as "the Hornsmen", perform in Broadway musicals including The Producers and Fiddler on the Roof.

== History ==
The band was established in 2003 after Mickenberg was given a song writing session with Shelton as a birthday gift from her boyfriend. The two wrote a song titled "I'm Disgusting (Will You Marry Me?)". They first became popular in 2006, when their song "Connecticut's for Fucking" attracted attention on the Internet and satellite radio. Mickenberg is from Connecticut, and so included references to many of her home state's cultural practices in the song.

Their eponymous debut album, which included the song "Connecticut's for Fucking", was released later that year. The band released its second album, Happier than You, on October 21, 2008 in the United Kingdom and a week later in the United States.

== Reception ==
"Connecticut's for Fucking" was commended by Niki D'Andrea of the Phoenix New Times for its "ridiculously catchy pop beat; dorky, nasal punk vocals (courtesy of the surprisingly sexy Risa Mickenburg); and lampooning of noodling '80s metal guitar solos," and concluded that it was "like a bubblegum enema flushing pop punk out of mainstream music's bloated colon." Ira Robbins also reviewed the song favorably, writing that it was "hysterical, a deadly putdown of the Nutmeg State as a nadir of middle-class tedium that proffers copulation as the only entertaining alternative."

Their self-titled debut album was reviewed by Jason MacNeil writing in PopMatters. MacNeil awarded the album a rating of 7 out of 10 and described the band's sound as "an odd blend of Sixpence None the Richer, Arcade Fire, and New Pornographers if they were all fronted by Amy Sedaris." It was also reviewed by David Menconi, who wrote in No Depression that its sound was "NRBQ with a metallic pop edge and an expanded horn section, fronted by a singer who looks a bit like Julia Louis-Dreyfus, sounds a bit like Sarah Vowell, and writes a bit like Amy Rigby — only much nastier." Similarly, the New Yorker reviewed their debut album and praised it for its "crusading horn section and...fine guitar playing." Another review appeared in the Tucson Weekly, and recommended that the reader buy the album "if you read and loved A Confederacy of Dunces or A Heartbreaking Work of Staggering Genius...especially if you're having a bad day." The reviewer, Linda Ray, also described the album's songs as "...a collection of intelligently observant and wryly amusing pop/rock/punk takes on gender politics." Robert Christgau reviewed their debut album and gave it an A−, writing that "Some of these songs are funny, the rest very funny."

Like their debut album, Happier than You was also reviewed by PopMatters, where Stephen Haag gave the album a score of 4 out of 10. He also criticized the album for being inferior to their debut album, and said that it "mines the same territory—clever people writing songs about sex and relationships, backed by big guitars and, uh, four hornsmen—though to much lesser effect." Robert Christgau reviewed this album and was more favorable, giving it an A− and writing that Mickenberg "sings the way [Lina Lamont in Singin' in the Rain] talks--only she can carry a tune and use her brain." In describing this album, NPR wrote that the band makes music that's "irreverent to some, but hilarious to others."

== Discography ==
- Jesus H. Christ and the Four Hornsmen of the Apocalypse (self-released, 2006)
- Happier Than You (self-released, 2008)
