= Dual fulfillment =

Christian belief about biblical prophecy

The dual fulfilment of prophecy (British English) or dual fulfillment (American English) or dual prophecy or duality in prophecy or present and future application is the mainly Christian idea that some prophecies in the Bible have both a short-term and long-term fulfillment. Not every biblical prophecy has a dual-fulfillment; which prophecies have dual-fulfillments are a matter of continuing discussion.

== Messianic prophecies ==
Examples include the Immanuel prophecy in Isaiah 7:14, which is understood as referring in its first fulfillment to the birth, dated at the time of Isaiah, of a child who would be a sign to Ahaz of the impending destruction of Rezin and Pekah by Tiglath Pileser III, often with the associated interpretation that the child to be born is Ahaz' heir, Hezekiah and the maiden Abijah, daughter of Zechariah. The same reasoning is also extended to the Wonderful, Counsellor, The mighty God, The everlasting Father, The Prince of Peace prophecy which occurs in another chapter (Isaiah 9:6).

In such examples messianic dual fulfillment is often related to concepts of messianic typology in the Old Testament.

== Nebuchadnezzar II and Titus ==
Some commentators see a secondary fulfillment of the prophecies concerning the Siege of Jerusalem (587 BC) with the events of the Siege of Jerusalem (70).

== AD 70 and the Last Days ==
Another area of perceived dual fulfillment is the overlapping fulfillment of short-term and long-term elements in the Olivet Prophecy. Events such as the siege of Jerusalem, Antiochus Epiphanes' sacrifice of a pig on the altar and the destruction of the Second Temple by Titus Flavius are seen by some Christians as only partial fulfillment of Matthew 24. The idea of dual fulfillment in this case is disputed by some Preterists.
