= Dominic Barker =

British children's author

Dominic Barker (born 1966) is a British children's author.

== Biography ==
Dominic Barker was born in Southport in 1966. He graduated from the University of Birmingham with a degree in English and then spent two years as part of a comedy double act before deciding to become a teacher. He taught at various schools including The Commonweal School, Swindon.

He currently lives in Barcelona.

== Awards and honours ==
In 2011, Max and Molly's Guide to Trouble: How to Catch a Criminal was selected for Richard and Judy's Children's Book Club.

Awards for Barker's books
Year	Title	Award	Result	Ref.
2000	Sharp Stuff	Branford Boase Award	Shortlist	
2007	Blart: The Boy Who Didn't Want to Save the World	Stockton Children's Book of the Year	Winner	

== Publications ==
=== Mickey Sharp series ===
- Sharp Stuff (1999)
- Sharp Shot (2001)
- Sharp Returns (2003)
- Sharp Beats (2008)

=== Blart series ===
- Blart: The Boy Who Didn't Want to Save the World (2006)
- Blart II: The Boy Who was Wanted Dead or Alive - Or Both (2007)
- Blart III: The Boy Who Set Sail on a Questionable Quest (2008)

=== Max and Molly's Guide to Trouble series ===
- Max and Molly's Guide to Trouble: How to Catch a Criminal (2011)
- Max and Molly's Guide to Trouble: How to Be a Genius (2011)
- Max and Molly's Guide to Trouble: How to Build an Abominable Snowman (2012)
- Max and Molly's Guide to Trouble: How to Stop a Viking Invasion (2012)

=== Standalone novels ===
- Adam and the Arkonaughts (2010)
