= Jack Whitaker (equestrian) =

English show jumper

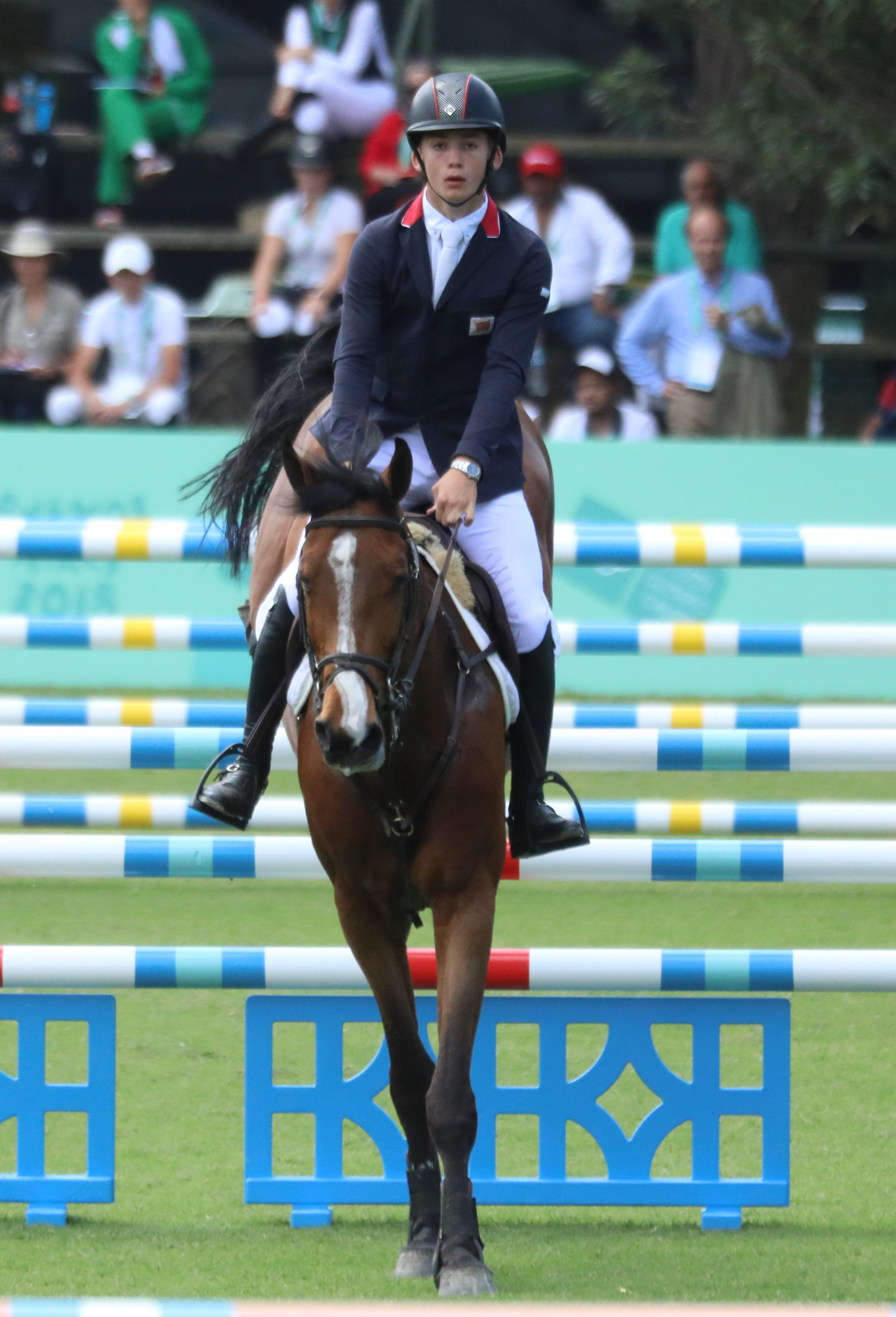
- 2018 Summer Youth Olympics – Team jumping

Personal information
- Nationality: British
- Born: 9 October 2001 (age 24)

Sport
- Sport: Equestrian

Jack Whitaker (born 9 October 2001) is a British equestrian who competes as a show jumper.

== Early life ==
Whitaker grew up in Nottinghamshire, where his parents run Whatton farm. A keen footballer, he spent time in the youth academy at Nottingham Forest.

== Career ==
In 2015, he won European Team Gold at the FEI European Pony Championships, riding Zodianne van de Doevenbree. The following year, he won Individual Gold and Team Bronze with Elando Van De Roshoeve at the event. In 2018 he competed at the Youth Olympic Games in Argentina where he won Team Silver riding L V Chance Luck.

In 2020, he was selected to be part of the Young Riders Academy. In 2021, he won his first five-star class at the Dutch Masters, riding Scenletha.

He won Individual Silver at the Youth European Championships in July 2021 on Scenletha. He also Team Bronze at the event, competing as part of the Young Rider squad under the title sponsor banner of Team NAF for Great Britain.

In 2022, he missed some competition time after injuring his spleen at the Northcote International. In 2023, he and Joe Stockdale became official ambassadors for the Royal Windsor Horse Show. In July 2023, riding Equine America Valmy de la Lande, he won the Royal International Salver at Hickstead.

In 2024 Jack was on the cover of Tatler magazine.

He competed in the first leg of the 2023-2024 FEI World Cup series in Oslo, Norway, and finished third on Equine America Valmy De La Lande. In 2025 Jack won two Grand Prix with Valmy de la Lande and the CIS5* class at Royal Windsor Horse Show.

Jack regularly competes on the Longines Global Champions Tour and is part of the Madrid In Motion GCL team. In December 2025, riding Valmy De La Lande he was runner-up to Victor Bettendorf on Cancun Zorel D in The Reindeer Speed Stakes at the London International Horse Show.

== Personal life ==
He is the son of Melissa and Michael Whitaker. He is a member of the Whitaker show jumping dynasty involving his father, his uncle John Whitaker, as well as his cousins Robert, William, Donald and Ellen Whitaker. He has two sisters Katie and Molly.
