= 2011 FEI Nations Cup Promotional League =

The 2011 FEI Nations Cup Promotional League is the 2011 edition of the secondary international team Grand Prix show jumping competition run by the FEI.

== European Promotional League ==
=== Standings ===
A team of a country that belongs to one of the 2011 FEI Nations Cup teams can not earn points in this league.

The teams of this league can earn points in this league and in the Challengers League. The best six results will be count for the final ranking.

The best-placed team of the 2011 Promotional League Europe, Switzerland, move into the 2012 FEI Nations Cup. The second-placed to fourth-placed teams of the 2011 Promotional League Europe have the permission to start in the 2011 Promotional League Final.

| | Team | Points | | | | | | | Total |
| | Team | AUT (Austria) | DEN (Denmark) | POR (Portugal) | NOR (Norway) | FIN (Finland) | ESP (Spain) | from Challengers League | Total |
|---|---|---|---|---|---|---|---|---|---|
| 1 | Switzerland | 9.5 | 6 | 10 | 15 | — | 4 | (3); 16 | 60.5 |
| 2 | Sweden | (4) | 8.5 | 12 | 10.5 | (5) | 8 | 15 | 54 |
| 3 | Italy | 12.5 | 6 | (5) | 9 | (4) | (3) | 21 | 48.5 |
| 4 | Spain | 7.5 | 11 | 6.5 | 6 | — | 11 | 2 | 44 |
| 5 | Finland | — | — | — | 8 | 1 | — | 14 | 23 |
| 6 | Austria | 7.5 | — | — | — | — | — | 14 | 21.5 |
| 7 | Norway | 1 | 1 | 2.5 | 7 | 2 | 7 | — | 20.5 |
| 8 | Brazil | 12.5 | 3.5 | — | — | — | — | — | 16 |
| 9 | Australia | — | 10 | — | — | — | — | — | 10 |
| 10 | Hungary | 0 | — | — | — | — | — | 7.5 | 7.5 |
| 11 | Saudi Arabia | 5.5 | — | — | — | — | — | — | 5.5 |
| 12 | Portugal | — | — | 4 | — | — | — | — | 4 |
| 13 | Hong Kong | — | 3.5 | — | — | — | — | — | 3.5 |
| | | AUT (Austria) | DEN (Denmark) | POR (Portugal) | NOR (Norway) | FIN (Finland) | ESP (Spain) | from Challengers League | |

=== Results ===
==== FEI Nations Cup of Belgium ====
The Nations Cup of Belgium should be the first station of the 2011 European Promotional League. Near-term before the horse show it was deleted as Promotional League competition. So the Nations Cup of Belgium did not count for European Promotional League standings.

CSIO 4* – April 28, 2011 to May 1, 2011 – Lummen (Vlaams Feest van de Paardensport), Belgium
Competition: Friday, April 29, 2011 – Start: 5:00 pm, prize money: 40000 €

| | Team | Rider | Horse | Round A | Round B | Total penalties | Jump-off | | Prize € |
| | Team | Rider | Horse | Penalties | Penalties | Total penalties | Penalties | Time (s) | Prize € |
|---|---|---|---|---|---|---|---|---|---|
| 1 | Germany | Janne Friederike Meyer | Lambrasco | 0 | 0 | | | | |
| 1 | Germany | Heiko Schmidt | Cassiopeia | 4 | 0 | | | | |
| 1 | Germany | Holger Wulschner | Abke | 8 | | | | | |
| 1 | Germany | Thomas Mühlbauer | Asti Spumante | 0 | 0 | | | | |
| 1 | Germany | | | 4 | 0 | 4 | | | 10,000 € |
| 2 | France | Pénélope Leprevost | Topinambour | 0 | 4 | | | | |
| 2 | France | Michel Robert | Kellemoi de Pepita | 0 | | | | | |
| 2 | France | Patrice Delaveau | Nayana | 8 | 0 | | | | |
| 2 | France | Olivier Guillon | Lord de Theize | 4 | 4 | | | | |
| 2 | France | | | 4 | 8 | 12 | | | 8,000 € |
| 3 | Ireland | Shane Breen | Camblin | 4 | 0 | | | | |
| 3 | Ireland | Jennifer Crooks | Uryadi | 1 | 4 | | | | |
| 3 | Ireland | Trevor Breen | Adventure de Kannan | 8 | | | | | |
| 3 | Ireland | Shane Carey | Lancero | 0 | 0 | | | | |
| 3 | Ireland | | | 9 | 4 | 13 | | | 6,000 € |
| 4 | Belgium | Rik Hemeryck | Challenge van de Begijnakker | 0 | 4 | | | | |
| 4 | Belgium | Olivier Philippaerts | Cabrio van de Heffinck | 9 | | | | | |
| 4 | Belgium | Nicola Philippaerts | Carlos V.H.P.Z. | 0 | 0 | | | | |
| 4 | Belgium | Jan Vinckier | Ursela | 4 | 8 | | | | |
| 4 | Belgium | | | 4 | 12 | 16 | | | 3,500 € |
| 4 | Australia | Wendy Schaeffer | Koyuna Sun Set | 0 | 8 | | | | |
| 4 | Australia | Amy Graham | Bella Baloubet | 4 | 0 | | | | |
| 4 | Australia | Damien Guthrie | Gilmore | 8 | | | | | |
| 4 | Australia | James Paterson-Robinson | Niack de L'Abbaye | 0 | 4 | | | | |
| 4 | Australia | | | 4 | 12 | 16 | | | 3,500 € |

(Top 5 of 10 Teams)
Grey penalties points do not count for the team result, in the second round only three riders per team are allowed to start.

==== FEI Nations Cup of Austria ====
CSIO 4* – May 12, 2011 to May 15, 2011 – Linz (Linzer Pferdefestival), Austria
Competition: Friday, May 13, 2011 – Start: 12:00 noon

| | Team | Rider | Horse | Round A | Round B | Total penalties | Jump-off | | scoring points |
| | Team | Rider | Horse | Penalties | Penalties | Total penalties | Penalties | Time (s) | scoring points |
|---|---|---|---|---|---|---|---|---|---|
| 1 | Germany | Jörg Oppermann | Che Guevara | 0 | 0 | | | | |
| 1 | Germany | Jan Sprehe | Paolini | 4 | 1 | | | | |
| 1 | Germany | David Will | Don CeSar | 4 | 4 | | | | |
| 1 | Germany | Jürgen Kraus | Bogeno | 8 | | | | | |
| 1 | Germany | | | 8 | 5 | 13 | | | - |
| 2 | Belgium | Patrick Spits | Cadjanine Z | 0 | 0 | | | | |
| 2 | Belgium | Peter Devos | Utopia van de Donkhoeve | 0 | 8 | | | | |
| 2 | Belgium | Niels Bruynseels | Carpalo | 4 | 8 | | | | |
| 2 | Belgium | Koen Vereecke | Allegro C van de Donkhoeve | 0 | | | | | |
| 2 | Belgium | | | 0 | 16 | 16 | | | - |
| 3 | Italy | Lucia Vizzini | Quinta Roo | 0 | 0 | | | | |
| 3 | Italy | Roberto Arioldi | Utile | 4 | 8 | | | | |
| 3 | Italy | Fabio Brotto | New Zealand delle Roane | 12 | 4 | | | | |
| 3 | Italy | Davide Kainich | Popey | 4 | | | | | |
| 3 | Italy | | | 8 | 12 | 20 | | | 12.5 |
| 3 | Brazil | Pedro Veniss | Amaryllis | 0 | 4 | | | | |
| 3 | Brazil | Karina Harbich Johannpeter | Dragonfly | 0 | 8 | | | | |
| 3 | Brazil | Yuri Mansur Guerios | Chico Z | 4 | 4 | | | | |
| 3 | Brazil | Carlos Motta Ribas | Ronaldo | 8 | 0 | | | | |
| 3 | Brazil | | | 4 | 16 | 20 | | | 12.5 |
| 5 | France | Aldrick Cheronnet | Barbarossa van Paemel | 1 | 5 | | | | |
| 5 | France | Bruno Jazade | Lune des Touches | 4 | 4 | | | | |
| 5 | France | Romain Duguet | Otello du Soleil | 8 | 8 | | | | |
| 5 | France | Stephan Lafouge | Pontiac | 0 | | | | | |
| 5 | France | | | 5 | 17 | 22 | | | - |
| 6 | Switzerland | Janika Sprunger | Uptown Boy | 0 | 4 | | | | |
| 6 | Switzerland | Werner Muff | Kiamon | 0 | 8 | | | | |
| 6 | Switzerland | Christina Liebherr | Casanova | 4 | 8 | | | | |
| 6 | Switzerland | Pius Schwizer | Verdi III | 4 | | | | | |
| 6 | Switzerland | | | 4 | 20 | 24 | | | 9.5 |
| 6 | Ukraine | Katharina Offel | Lord If de Chalusse | 0 | 0 | | | | |
| 6 | Ukraine | Björn Nagel | Va et Viens van de Zelm | 0 | 12 | | | | |
| 6 | Ukraine | Cassio Rivetti | Verdi | 0 | 12 | | | | |
| 6 | Ukraine | Oleksandr Onyshchenko | Vivant | 16 | | | | | |
| 6 | Ukraine | | | 0 | 24 | 24 | | | (9.5) |

(Top 7 of 15 Teams)
Grey penalties points do not count for the team result, in the second round only three riders per team are allowed to start.

==== FEI Nations Cup of Denmark ====
CSIO 4* – May 19, 2011 to May 22, 2011 – Copenhagen, Denmark
Competition: Friday, May 20, 2011 – Start: 3:30 pm

| | Team | Rider | Horse | Round A | Round B | Total penalties | Jump-off | | Prize money € | scoring points |
| | Team | Rider | Horse | Penalties | Penalties | Total penalties | Penalties | Time (s) | Prize money € | scoring points |
|---|---|---|---|---|---|---|---|---|---|---|
| 1 | Ireland | David O'Brien | Annestown | 0 | 0 | | | | | |
| 1 | Ireland | Jennifer Crooks | Uryadi | 0 | 8 | | | | | |
| 1 | Ireland | Alexander Butler | Will Wimble | 0 | 4 | | | | | |
| 1 | Ireland | Dermott Lennon | Kalvinretto | 0 | | | | | | |
| 1 | Ireland | | | 0 | 12 | 12 | | | 8,000 € | - |
| 2 | Germany | Holger Wulschner | Cefalo | 4 | 0 | | | | | |
| 2 | Germany | Thomas Voss | Carinjo | 6 | 4 | | | | | |
| 2 | Germany | Janne Friederike Meyer | Lambrasco | 4 | 4 | | | | | |
| 2 | Germany | Jörg Naeve | Calado | 0 | | | | | | |
| 2 | Germany | | | 8 | 8 | 16 | | | 6,000 € | - |
| 3 | Netherlands | Angelique Hoorn | O'Brien | 0 | 0 | | | | | |
| 3 | Netherlands | Suzanne Tepper | Alwin Z | 4 | | | | | | |
| 3 | Netherlands | Nathalie van der Mei | Valeska | 0 | 16 | | | | | |
| 3 | Netherlands | Jur Vrieling | Emmerton | 4 | 4 | | | | | |
| 3 | Netherlands | | | 4 | 20 | 24 | | | 3,500 € | - |
| 3 | Belgium | Guido Hornesch | Concorde | 4 | 8 | | | | | |
| 3 | Belgium | Donaat Brondeel | Adorado | 0 | 4 | | | | | |
| 3 | Belgium | Delphine Goemaere | Rexar du Houssoit | 4 | | | | | | |
| 3 | Belgium | Grégory Wathelet | Olympie des Villas | 8 | 4 | | | | | |
| 3 | Belgium | | | 8 | 16 | 24 | | | 3,500 € | - |
| 5 | Spain | Pascal Levy | Leopold Pierreville | 8 | | | | | | |
| 5 | Spain | Natalia Golding | Just Cruising | 4 | 8 | | | | | |
| 5 | Spain | Antonio Marinas Soto | Al Capone | 0 | 9 | | | | | |
| 5 | Spain | Manuel Añon Suarez | Baldo DS | 0 | 8 | | | | | |
| 5 | Spain | | | 4 | 25 | 29 | | | 2,000 € | 11 |
| 6 | Australia | Wendy Schaeffer | Koyuna Sun Set | 1 | 3 | | | | | |
| 6 | Australia | Amy Graham | Bella Baloubet | 0 | 16 | | | | | |
| 6 | Australia | Damien Guthrie | Gilmore | 0 | 12 | | | | | |
| 6 | Australia | | | 1 | 32 | 33 | | | 1,600 € | 10 |

(Top 6 of 15 Teams)
Grey penalties points do not count for the team result, in the second round only three riders per team are allowed to start.

==== FEI Nations Cup of Portugal ====
CSIO 3* – May 26, 2011 to May 29, 2011 – Lisbon, Portugal
Competition: Friday, May 27, 2011 – Start: 6:00 pm

| | Team | Rider | Horse | Round A | Round B | Total penalties | Jump-off | | Prize money € | scoring points |
| | Team | Rider | Horse | Penalties | Penalties | Total penalties | Penalties | Time (s) | Prize money € | scoring points |
|---|---|---|---|---|---|---|---|---|---|---|
| 1 | Sweden | Erika Lickhammer | Hip Hop | 0 | 0 | | | | | |
| 1 | Sweden | Lisen Bratt Fredriksson | Matrix | 0 | 0 | | | | | |
| 1 | Sweden | Alexander Zetterman | High Yummy | 0 | | | | | | |
| 1 | Sweden | Helena Persson | Bonzai H | 4 | 0 | | | | | |
| 1 | Sweden | | | 0 | 0 | 0 | | | 6,250 € | 12 |
| 2 | Switzerland | Martin Fuchs | Principal | 0 | 0 | | | | | |
| 2 | Switzerland | Marc Oertly | Tamira IV | 0 | 0 | | | | | |
| 2 | Switzerland | Jessy Putallaz | Kolebo des Cabanes | 16 | | | | | | |
| 2 | Switzerland | Steve Guerdat | Ferrari | 4 | 0 | | | | | |
| 2 | Switzerland | | | 4 | 0 | 4 | | | 5,000 € | 10 |
| 3 | France | Aldrick Cheronnet | Barbarossa van Paemel | 4 | 8 | | | | | |
| 3 | France | Jerome Hurel | Ohm de Ponthual | 0 | 0 | | | | | |
| 3 | France | Eugenie Angot | Old Chap Tame | 0 | 0 | | | | | |
| 3 | France | Florian Angot | Made in Semilly | 0 | | | | | | |
| 3 | France | | | 0 | 8 | 8 | | | 3,375 € | - |
| 3 | Great Britain | Laura Renwick | Oz de Breve | 8 | | | | | | |
| 3 | Great Britain | Bruce Menzies | Sultan | 0 | 4 | | | | | |
| 3 | Great Britain | Matthew Sampson | Utopia XII | 0 | 0 | | | | | |
| 3 | Great Britain | William Funnell | Billy Angelo | 4 | 0 | | | | | |
| 3 | Great Britain | | | 4 | 4 | 8 | | | 3,375 € | - |
| 5 | Spain | Pilar Cordon | Nuage Bleu | 4 | 0 | | | | | |
| 5 | Spain | Eduardo Alvarez Aznar | Odiel | 11 | | | | | | |
| 5 | Spain | Jesus Garmendia Echeverria | Lord du Mont Milon | 4 | 0 | | | | | |
| 5 | Spain | Sergio Alvarez Moya | Wisconsin | 4 | 0 | | | | | |
| 5 | Spain | | | 12 | 0 | 12 | | | 2,125 € | 6.5 |
| 5 | Belgium | Ludo Philippaerts | Vadetta van het Mettenhof | 4 | 8 | | | | | |
| 5 | Belgium | Olivier Philippaerts | Cabrio van de Heffinck | 0 | 0 | | | | | |
| 5 | Belgium | Kim Thiry | Boomer van't Heike | 8 | | | | | | |
| 5 | Belgium | Nicola Philippaerts | Carlos | 0 | 0 | | | | | |
| 5 | Belgium | | | 4 | 8 | 12 | | | 2,125 € | - |

(Top 6 of 11 Teams)
Grey penalties points do not count for the team result, in the second round only three riders per team are allowed to start.

==== FEI Nations Cup of Norway ====
CSIO 3* – June 16, 2011 to June 19, 2011 – Drammen, Norway
Competition: Saturday, June 18, 2011

| | Team | Rider | Horse | Round A | Round B | Total penalties | Jump-off | | scoring points |
| | Team | Rider | Horse | Penalties | Penalties | Total penalties | Penalties | Time (s) | scoring points |
|---|---|---|---|---|---|---|---|---|---|
| 1 | Switzerland | Arthur Gustavo da Silva | La Toya III | 0 | 4 | | | | |
| 1 | Switzerland | Niklaus Schurtenberger | Fifty Fifty | 0 | | | | | |
| 1 | Switzerland | Claudia Gisler | Touchable | 4 | 0 | | | | |
| 1 | Switzerland | Christina Liebherr | Callas Sitte Z | 11 | 0 | | | | |
| 1 | Switzerland | | | 4 | 4 | 8 | | | 15 |
| 2 | Turkey | Gerry Flynn | Ledgepoint | 0 | 0 | | | | |
| 2 | Turkey | Çağrı Başel | Goldrusf | 0 | | | | | |
| 2 | Turkey | Omer Karaevli | Dadiak Tur Puttenen | 1 | 5 | | | | |
| 2 | Turkey | Burak Azak | Castelo Branco | 0 | 4 | | | | |
| 2 | Turkey | | | 0 | 9 | 9 | | | (13) |
| 3 | Poland | Msciwoj Kiecon | Urbane | 0 | 0 | | | | |
| 3 | Poland | Piotr Sawicki | Caballus Z | 1 | 8 | | | | |
| 3 | Poland | Antoni Tomaszewski | Trojka | 5 | 8 | | | | |
| 3 | Poland | | | 6 | 16 | 22 | | | (12) |
| 4 | Sweden | Angelica Augustsson | Walter | 4 | 8 | | | | |
| 4 | Sweden | Malin Baryard-Johnsson | Reveur de Hurtebise | 4 | | | | | |
| 4 | Sweden | Peder Fredricson | Arctic Aurora Borealis | 0 | 0 | | | | |
| 4 | Sweden | Helena Persson | Bonzai H | 4 | 12 | | | | |
| 4 | Sweden | | | 8 | 20 | 28 | | | 10.5 |
| 4 | Denmark | Linnea Ericsson | Qruella M | 0 | 12 | | | | |
| 4 | Denmark | Thomas Sandgaard | Amarone | 4 | 8 | | | | |
| 4 | Denmark | Rikke Haastrup | Luganer | 0 | 4 | | | | |
| 4 | Denmark | Torben Frandsen | Alcamo Vogt | 8 | | | | | |
| 4 | Denmark | | | 4 | 24 | 28 | | | - |
| 6 | Italy | Francesca Capponi | Stallone | 0 | 8 | | | | |
| 6 | Italy | Davide Kainich | Popey | eliminated | 16 | | | | |
| 6 | Italy | Roberto Turchetto | Samurai | 8 | | | | | |
| 6 | Italy | Lorenzo Toscano | Rinaldo | 1 | 8 | | | | |
| 6 | Italy | | | 9 | 31 | 41 | | | 9 |
| 7 | Finland | Jessica Timgren | Zanra Z | 8 | 8 | | | | |
| 7 | Finland | Satu Liukkonen | Qui Vivra Verra | 4 | 17 | | | | |
| 7 | Finland | Sebastian Numminen | Calandro | 4 | 12 | | | | |
| 7 | Finland | Ville Kulkas | Victory-M | 1 | | | | | |
| 7 | Finland | | | 9 | 37 | 46 | | | 8 |

(Top 7 of 14 Teams)
Grey penalties points do not count for the team result, in the second round only three riders per team are allowed to start.

==== FEI Nations Cup of Finland ====
CSIO 3* – July 1, 2011 to July 3, 2011 – Hamina, Finland
Competition: Sunday, June 3, 2011

| | Team | Rider | Horse | Round A | Round B | Total penalties | Jump-off | | scoring points |
| | Team | Rider | Horse | Penalties | Penalties | Total penalties | Penalties | Time (s) | scoring points |
|---|---|---|---|---|---|---|---|---|---|
| 1 | Netherlands | Henk van de Pol | Kirfa de Kreisker | 0 | 0 | | 0 | 37.78 | |
| 1 | Netherlands | Piet Raijmakers jr. | Valentino | 0 | 4 | | | | |
| 1 | Netherlands | Frans Wijlaars | Udo | 13 | | | | | |
| 1 | Netherlands | Jur Vrieling | Sissi van't Schuttershof | 0 | 5 | | | | |
| 1 | Netherlands | | | 0 | 9 | 9 | 0 | 37.78 | - |
| 2 | Sweden | Jens Fredricson | Lunatic | 4 | 0 | | | | |
| 2 | Sweden | Lisen Bratt-Fredricson | Matrix | 4 | 1 | | | | |
| 2 | Sweden | Daniel Zetterman | Glory Days | 0 | 0 | | | | |
| 2 | Sweden | Peder Fredricson | Holliday KLG | 0 | 4 | | 8 | 34.18 | |
| 2 | Sweden | | | 4 | 5 | 9 | 8 | 34.18 | 5 |
| 3 | Italy | Roberto Turchetto | Samurai | 4 | 0 | | | | |
| 3 | Italy | Giovanni Consorti | Silverstras | 4 | 8 | | | | |
| 3 | Italy | Francesca Capponi | Stallone | 4 | 0 | | | | |
| 3 | Italy | Lorenzo Toscano | Rinaldo | 1 | | | | | |
| 3 | Italy | | | 9 | 8 | 17 | | | 4 |
| 4 | Denmark | Jennifer Pedersen | Linnea Ask | 12 | | | | | |
| 4 | Denmark | Kim Kristensen | Kamila | 11 | 4 | | | | |
| 4 | Denmark | Camilla Enemark | Party Dance | 5 | 0 | | | | |
| 4 | Denmark | Karina Skou Truelsen | Caput | 12 | 8 | | | | |
| 4 | Denmark | | | 28 | 12 | 40 | | | - |

(Top 4 of 6 Teams)
Grey penalties points do not count for the team result, in the second round only three riders per team are allowed to start.

==== FEI Nations Cup of Spain ====
CSIO 5* Gijón – August 31, 2011 to September 5, 2011 – Gijón, Spain
Competition: Sunday, September 3, 2011

| | Team | Rider | Horse | Round A | Round B | Total penalties | Jump-off | | Prize money € | scoring points |
| | Team | Rider | Horse | Penalties | Penalties | Total penalties | Penalties | Time (s) | Prize money € | scoring points |
|---|---|---|---|---|---|---|---|---|---|---|
| 1 | Spain | Pilar Lucrecia Cordón Muro | Nuage Bleu | 0 | 0 | | | | | |
| 1 | Spain | Eduardo Alvarez Aznar | Rico Revel | 12 | 8 | | | | | |
| 1 | Spain | Jesus Garmendia Echeverria | Lord du Mont Milon | 4 | 13 | | | | | |
| 1 | Spain | Julio Arias Cueva | Murat de Reve | 0 | 0 | | | | | |
| 1 | Spain | | | 4 | 8 | 12 | | | 20,000 € | 11 |
| 2 | Great Britain | Scott Brash | Bon Ami II | 12 | 4 | | | | | |
| 2 | Great Britain | David McPherson | Billy Bishop | 0 | 0 | | | | | |
| 2 | Great Britain | Bruce Menzies | Sultan | 0 | 0 | | | | | |
| 2 | Great Britain | Robert Whitaker | Omelli | 10 | 8 | | | | | |
| 2 | Great Britain | | | 11 | 4 | 15 | | | 14,000 € | - |
| 3 | Sweden | Malin Baryard-Johnsson | Tornesch | 0 | 8 | | | | | |
| 3 | Sweden | Helena Persson | Bonzai H | 0 | 8 | | | | | |
| 3 | Sweden | Peder Fredricson | Arctic Aurora Borealis | 0 | 4 | | | | | |
| 3 | Sweden | Svante Johansson | Caramell KS | 4 | 4 | | | | | |
| 3 | Sweden | | | 0 | 16 | 16 | | | 10,000 € | 8 |
| 4 | Norway | Stein Endresen | Hoo de Monterey | 4 | 0 | | | | | |
| 4 | Norway | Nina Braaten | Loyd | 4 | 4 | | | | | |
| 4 | Norway | Nicholai Lindbjerg | Coquette | 21 | 8 | | | | | |
| 4 | Norway | Geir Gulliksen | L'Espoir | 4 | 7 | | | | | |
| 4 | Norway | | | 12 | 11 | 23 | | | 8,000 € | 7 |
| 5 | France | Eugenie Angot | Old Chap Tame | did not start | did not start | | | | | |
| 5 | France | Pénélope Leprevost | Topinambour | 4 | 0 | | | | | |
| 5 | France | Clement Boulanger | Winsome van de Plataan | 8 | 8 | | | | | |
| 5 | France | Patrice Delaveau | Orient Express | 0 | 4 | | | | | |
| 5 | France | | | 12 | 12 | 24 | | | 6,000 € | - |
| 6 | Ireland | Edward Doyle | Samgemjee | 4 | 8 | | | | | |
| 6 | Ireland | Marion Hughes | Fortuna | 9 | 8 | | | | | |
| 6 | Ireland | Dermott Lennon | Lou Lou | 4 | 4 | | | | | |
| 6 | Ireland | Captain David O'Brien | Annestown | 4 | 4 | | | | | |
| 6 | Ireland | | | 12 | 16 | 28 | | | 5,600 € | - |

(Top 6 of 10 Teams)
Grey penalties points do not count for the team result.

== Challengers League ==
=== Standings ===
A team of a country that belongs to one of the 2011 FEI Nations Cup teams can not earn points in this league.

The teams of this league can earn points in this league and in the European Promotional League. The best six results will be count for the final ranking.

The first-placed to third-placed teams of the 2011 Challengers League will have the permission to start in the 2011 Promotional League Final.

| | Team | Points | | | | | | Total |
| | Team | BUL (Bulgaria) | GRE (Greece) | POL (Poland) | BLR (Belarus) | SVK (Slovakia) | from other leagues | Total |
|---|---|---|---|---|---|---|---|---|
| 1 | Ukraine | — | — | 12 | — | 14 | 9.5 | 35.5 |
| 2 | Turkey | 3 | 1 | 8 | — | — | 13 | 25 |
| 3 | Poland | — | — | 4 | — | 6 | 15 | 25 |
| 4 | Bulgaria | 6 | 2 | — | — | 1 | — | 9 |
| 5 | Russia | — | — | — | 6 | 0 | — | 6 |
| 6 | Czech Republic | — | — | — | — | 6 | 0 | 6 |
| 7 | Slovakia | — | — | — | — | 5.5 | — | 5.5 |
| 8 | Belarus | — | — | — | 4 | — | — | 4 |
| 9 | Greece | 1 | 3 | — | — | — | — | 4 |
| 10 | Lithuania | — | — | — | 3 | — | — | 3 |
| 11 | Estonia | — | — | — | 2 | — | — | 2 |
| 11 | Romania | 2 | — | — | — | — | — | 2 |
| 13 | Japan | — | — | — | — | — | 2 | 2 |
| 14 | Latvia | — | — | — | 1 | — | — | 1 |
| 15 | Slovenia | — | — | — | — | 0 | — | 0 |
| | | BUL (Bulgaria) | GRE (Greece) | POL (Poland) | BLR (Belarus) | SVK (Slovakia) | from other leagues | |

=== Results ===
==== FEI Nations Cup of Bulgaria ====
CSIO 2* – June 2, 2011 to June 5, 2011 – Bozhurishte near Sofia, Bulgaria
Competition: Friday, June 3, 2011 – Start: 2:00 pm

| | Team | Rider | Horse | Round A | Round B | Total penalties | Jump-off | | scoring points |
| | Team | Rider | Horse | Penalties | Penalties | Total penalties | Penalties | Time (s) | scoring points |
|---|---|---|---|---|---|---|---|---|---|
| 1 | Bulgaria | Kalin Nedelchev | C'Est mon Amie | 4 | 0 | | | | |
| 1 | Bulgaria | Asparuh Atanasov | Jessika de Bois | 8 | 4 | | | | |
| 1 | Bulgaria | Rossen Raichev | Winchester van de Paddenborre | 4 | 8 | | | | |
| 1 | Bulgaria | Valentin Valkov | Billy King | 8 | retired | | | | |
| 1 | Bulgaria | | | 16 | 12 | 28 | | | 6 |
| 2 | Hungary | Richard Jovan | Vajk | 4 | 4 | | | | |
| 2 | Hungary | Zoltan Czékus | Kabuki des Isles | 4 | 8 | | | | |
| 2 | Hungary | Attila Szasz | Venusz | 8 | 12 | | | | |
| 2 | Hungary | Istvan Bogar | Lili | 4 | 20 | | | | |
| 2 | Hungary | | | 12 | 24 | 36 | | | (4) |
| 3 | Turkey | Oktay Seze | Royal Star | 12 | 4 | | | | |
| 3 | Turkey | Husnu Dinc | Hilton | 8 | 12 | | | | |
| 3 | Turkey | Efe Siyahi | Lucifer des Isles | 16 | 12 | | | | |
| 3 | Turkey | Hulki Karagulle | Amante M | 0 | 12 | | | | |
| 3 | Turkey | | | 20 | 28 | 48 | | | 3 |
| 4 | Romania | Aron Jakab | Gina | 4 | 0 | | | | |
| 4 | Romania | Norbert Schuman | Cheandro Z | 16 | 12 | | | | |
| 4 | Romania | Luca Ruxandariu | Nerodie | 20 | 32 | | | | |
| 4 | Romania | Florin Lates | Kruger de la Roche | 44 | 40 | | | | |
| 4 | Romania | | | 40 | 44 | 84 | | | 2 |
| 5 | Greece | Dimitri Natsis | Baldwin | 8 | retired | | | | |
| 5 | Greece | Stelios Stavroulakis | Baiao | 16 | 12 | | | | |
| 5 | Greece | Konstantinos Pagratis | Comes van Hofsanck | 20 | 28 | | | | |
| 5 | Greece | Efthymios Kremiotis | Coralie | 32 | 48 | | | | |
| 5 | Greece | | | 44 | 96 | 140 | | | 1 |

==== FEI Nations Cup of Greece ====
CSIO 3*-W – June 9, 2011 to June 12, 2011 – Markopoulo Olympic Equestrian Centre near Athens, Greece
Competition: Friday, June 10, 2011

| | Team | Rider | Horse | Round A | Round B | Total penalties | Jump-off | | Prize money € | scoring points |
| | Team | Rider | Horse | Penalties | Penalties | Total penalties | Penalties | Time (s) | Prize money € | scoring points |
|---|---|---|---|---|---|---|---|---|---|---|
| 1 | Italy | Alberto Zorzi | Maestro de Tivoli | 8 | 0 | | | | | |
| 1 | Italy | Carola Garre | Ultra-Top van't Paradijs | 4 | 0 | | | | | |
| 1 | Italy | Ludovica Miloni | Loisir du Bocage | 8 | 0 | | | | | |
| 1 | Italy | Luca Marziani | Lolita de la Loge | 0 | did not start | | | | | |
| 1 | Italy | | | 12 | 0 | 12 | | | 8,250 € | (5) |
| 2 | Greece | Hannah Mytilinaiou | Equita | 4 | 4 | | | | | |
| 2 | Greece | Monika Martini | Cleopatra | 8 | 4 | | | | | |
| 2 | Greece | Kritonas Zafiropoulos | Vieanne | 12 | 0 | | | | | |
| 2 | Greece | Alexandros Fourlis | Cappucino Z | 0 | did not start | | | | | |
| 2 | Greece | | | 12 | 8 | 20 | | | 6,250 € | 3 |
| 3 | Bulgaria | Asparuh Athanasov | Jessica de Bois | 1 | 14 | | | | | |
| 3 | Bulgaria | Kalin Nedelchev | C'est mon amie | 8 | 4 | | | | | |
| 3 | Bulgaria | Valentin Valkov | Billy King | 8 | 4 | | | | | |
| 3 | Bulgaria | Dimitar Vasilev | Valido | 18 | 25 | | | | | |
| 3 | Bulgaria | | | 17 | 22 | 39 | | | 4,750 € | 2 |
| 4 | Turkey | Hasan Senturk | Mylaan D | 4 | 4 | | | | | |
| 4 | Turkey | Oktay Sezek | Royal Star | 0 | 4 | | | | | |
| 4 | Turkey | Husnu Dinc | Hilton | 13 | 20 | | | | | |
| 4 | Turkey | | | 17 | 28 | 45 | | | 3,750 € | 1 |

Grey penalties points do not count for the team result, in the second round only three riders per team are allowed to start.

==== FEI Nations Cup of Poland ====
CSIO 3* – June 9, 2011 to June 12, 2011 – Sopot, Poland
Competition: Friday, June 10, 2011

| | Team | Rider | Horse | Round A | Round B | Total penalties | Jump-off | | Prize money CHF | scoring points |
| | Team | Rider | Horse | Penalties | Penalties | Total penalties | Penalties | Time (s) | Prize money CHF | scoring points |
|---|---|---|---|---|---|---|---|---|---|---|
| 1 | Ukraine | Cassio Rivetti | Verdi | 0 | 0 | | | | | |
| 1 | Ukraine | Oleg Krasyuk | Canvas PKZ | 8 | | | | | | |
| 1 | Ukraine | Björn Nagel | Va et Viens van de Zelm | 4 | 4 | | | | | |
| 1 | Ukraine | Katharina Offel | Vivant | 0 | 0 | | | | | |
| 1 | Ukraine | | | 4 | 4 | 8 | | | 9,900 CHF | 12 |
| 2 | France | Walter Lapertot | Wodan | 5 | 4 | | | | | |
| 2 | France | Romain Duguet | Otello du Soleil | 0 | 0 | | | | | |
| 2 | France | Caril Bouvard | Oleander | 0 | 4 | | | | | |
| 2 | France | Bruno Jazede | Lune des Touches | 4 | | | | | | |
| 2 | France | | | 4 | 8 | 12 | | | 6,300 CHF | - |
| 3 | Sweden | Jens Fredricson | Lunatic | 0 | 0 | | | | | |
| 3 | Sweden | Nicolina Savback | Valoma | 8 | | | | | | |
| 3 | Sweden | Stephanie Finetto | Merlins Magic | 4 | 8 | | | | | |
| 3 | Sweden | Erika Lickhammer | Hip Hop | 4 | 0 | | | | | |
| 3 | Sweden | | | 8 | 8 | 16 | | | 4,500 CHF | (9) |
| 4 | Turkey | Omer Karaevli | Dadiak Tur Puttenen | 4 | 4 | | | | | |
| 4 | Turkey | Burak Azak | Castelo Branco | 6 | | | | | | |
| 4 | Turkey | Çağrı Başel | Goldrusf | 4 | | | | | | |
| 4 | Turkey | Gerry Flynn | Ulano | 4 | 5 | | | | | |
| 4 | Turkey | | | 9 | 10 | 19 | | | 2,700 CHF | 8 |
| 5 | Italy | Giulia Martinengo | Chiclana | 8 | 0 | | | | | |
| 5 | Italy | Fabio Brotto | New Zealand delle Roane | 0 | 1 | | | | | |
| 5 | Italy | Simone Coata | Mirage del Levaux | 4 | | | | | | |
| 5 | Italy | Roberto Arioldi | Utile | eliminated | 8 | | | | | |
| 5 | Italy | | | 12 | 9 | 21 | | | 2,100 CHF | (7) |
| 6 | Finland | Sebastian Numminen | Calandor | 4 | 4 | | | | | |
| 6 | Finland | Jessica Timgren | Zanra Z | 4 | 8 | | | | | |
| 6 | Finland | Satu Liukkonen | Qui Vivra Verra | 5 | 4 | | | | | |
| 6 | Finland | Anna Julia Kontio | Eafons Escape | 4 | | | | | | |
| 6 | Finland | | | 12 | 16 | 28 | | | 1,800 CHF | (6) |
| 7 | Germany | Rebecca Golasch | Lassen Peak | 4 | 4 | | | | | |
| 7 | Germany | Andreas Ripke | Edelgaard's Saqini | 4 | 13 | | | | | |
| 7 | Germany | Andre Thieme | Aragon Rouet | 13 | | | | | | |
| 7 | Germany | Joachim Heyer | Aquito | 4 | 4 | | | | | |
| 7 | Germany | | | 12 | 21 | 33 | | | 1,500 CHF | - |

(Top 7 of 11 Teams)
Grey penalties points do not count for the team result, in the second round only three riders per team are allowed to start.

==== FEI Nations Cup of Belarus ====
CSIO 2*-W – July 28, 2011 to July 31, 2011 – Minsk, Belarus

| | Team | Rider | Horse | Round A | Round B | Total penalties | Jump-off | | Prize money € | scoring points |
| | Team | Rider | Horse | Penalties | Penalties | Total penalties | Penalties | Time (s) | Prize money € | scoring points |
|---|---|---|---|---|---|---|---|---|---|---|
| 1 | Russia | Natalia Simonia | Solana | 4 | 0 | | | | | |
| 1 | Russia | Olga Danilova | Kilar | 8 | 0 | | | | | |
| 1 | Russia | Vladimir Tuganov | Amarok | 8 | 0 | | | | | |
| 1 | Russia | Anna Gromzina | Pimlico | 8 | | | | | | |
| 1 | Russia | | | 12 | 0 | 12 | | | 7,500 € | 6 |
| 2 | Belarus | Vasil Ivanou | Aleqs | 12 | 0 | | | | | |
| 2 | Belarus | Ibragim Vaskov | La-Pass | 4 | 0 | | | | | |
| 2 | Belarus | Yahor Morotski | Wacanto S | 8 | 4 | | | | | |
| 2 | Belarus | Maxim Kryna | Casimir | 20 | | | | | | |
| 2 | Belarus | | | 24 | 4 | 28 | | | 5,700 € | 4 |
| 3 | Lithuania | Nerijus Sipaila | Thorn | 8 | 8 | | | | | |
| 3 | Lithuania | Andrius Petrovas | Van Helsing | 12 | 4 | | | | | |
| 3 | Lithuania | Benas Gutkauskas | Lascar | 0 | 0 | | | | | |
| 3 | Lithuania | Aleksejus Timofejevas | Quattro | 16 | | | | | | |
| 3 | Lithuania | | | 20 | 12 | 32 | | | 4,500 € | 3 |
| 4 | Estonia | Ebbe-Liisa Sõnajalg | Trooja | 4 | 0 | | | | | |
| 4 | Estonia | Heiki Vatsel | Fee | 8 | 4 | | | | | |
| 4 | Estonia | Andres Udeküll | Ex Calibur | 8 | 12 | | | | | |
| 4 | Estonia | Margit Magi | Rising Sun | 20 | | | | | | |
| 4 | Estonia | | | 20 | 16 | 36 | | | 3,300 € | 2 |
| 5 | Latvia | Kristaps Neretnieks | Goldring | 28 | 24 | | | | | |
| 5 | Latvia | Guntars Silinsh | Lord Picasso | 16 | 4 | | | | | |
| 5 | Latvia | Dainis Ozols | Laguna | 4 | 12 | | | | | |
| 5 | Latvia | | | 48 | 40 | 88 | | | 2,000 € | 1 |

Grey penalties points do not count for the team result, in the second round only three riders per team are allowed to start.

==== FEI Nations Cup of Slovakia ====
CSIO 3*-W – August 11, 2011 to August 14, 2011 – Bratislava, Slovakia
Competition: Friday, August 12, 2011

Because of the rules of the FEI Nations Cup Promotional League, only 15 of the 17 participating teams can earn ranking points here.

| | Team | Rider | Horse | Round A | Round B | Total penalties | Jump-off | | Prize money € | scoring points |
| | Team | Rider | Horse | Penalties | Penalties | Total penalties | Penalties | Time (s) | Prize money € | scoring points |
|---|---|---|---|---|---|---|---|---|---|---|
| 1 | Switzerland | Hansueli Sprunger | Kepi de Valse | 8 | | | | | | |
| 1 | Switzerland | Martin Fuchs | Principal | 0 | 4 | | | | | |
| 1 | Switzerland | Janika Sprunger | Uptown Boy | 0 | 4 | | | | | |
| 1 | Switzerland | Steve Guerdat | Nino de Buissonetts | 4 | 0 | | | | | |
| 1 | Switzerland | | | 4 | 8 | 12 | | | 7,000 € | (16) |
| 2 | Ukraine | Cassio Rivetti | Verdi | 5 | 0 | | | | | |
| 2 | Ukraine | Oleksandr Onyshchenko | Comte d'Arsouilles | 12 | | | | | | |
| 2 | Ukraine | Björn Nagel | La Bomba | 4 | 0 | | | | | |
| 2 | Ukraine | Katharina Offel | Sanctos van het Gravenhof | 4 | 0 | | | | | |
| 2 | Ukraine | | | 13 | 0 | 13 | | | 4,800 € | 14 |
| 3 | Austria | Stefan Eder | Chilli van Dijk | 0 | 4 | | | | | |
| 3 | Austria | Julia Kayser | Valdato | 4 | 9 | | | | | |
| 3 | Austria | Christian Fries | Lanco | 4 | | | | | | |
| 3 | Austria | Thomas Frühmann | The Sixth Sense | 4 | 0 | | | | | |
| 3 | Austria | | | 8 | 13 | 21 | | | 3,200 € | (13) |
| 4 | France | Romain Duguet | Otello du Soleil | 0 | 8 | | | | | |
| 4 | France | Julia Dallmano | Sarantos | 4 | | | | | | |
| 4 | France | Hugo Breul | Loup Cael | 8 | 4 | | | | | |
| 4 | France | Aymeric Azzolino | Moustic des Flayelle | 0 | 8 | | | | | |
| 4 | France | | | 4 | 20 | 24 | | | 2,500 € | - |
| 5 | Belgium | Fabienne Lange | Reine Fee des Hazalle | 0 | 4 | | | | | |
| 5 | Belgium | Alexander Kumps | Cru d'Avril Z | 0 | 8 | | | | | |
| 5 | Belgium | Jules van Roosbroeck | Cabriolet | 8 | 8 | | | | | |
| 5 | Belgium | Sven van Dijck | Vici R | 16 | | | | | | |
| 5 | Belgium | | | 8 | 20 | 28 | | | 2,000 € | - |
| 6 | Germany | Jörg Oppermann | Che Guevara | 4 | 0 | | | | | |
| 6 | Germany | Nisse Lüneburg | Calle Cool | 4 | 8 | | | | | |
| 6 | Germany | Tobias Meyer | Lucrate d'Eau Grenou | 8 | | | | | | |
| 6 | Germany | David Will | Giovanni | 4 | 10 | | | | | |
| 6 | Germany | | | 12 | 18 | 30 | | | 1,500 € | - |
| 7 | Italy | Lucia Vizzini | Quinta Roo | 8 | 8 | | | | | |
| 7 | Italy | Antonio Alfonso | Challenge | 8 | | | | | | |
| 7 | Italy | Luca Marziani | Wivina | 0 | 12 | | | | | |
| 7 | Italy | Giulia Martinengo | Chiclana | 0 | 4 | | | | | |
| 7 | Italy | | | 8 | 24 | 32 | | | 1,000 € | (9) |
| 8 | Finland | Maiju Mallat | Urleven van de Helle | 4 | 8 | | | | | |
| 8 | Finland | Satu Liukkonen | Qui Vivra Verra | 20 | | | | | | |
| 8 | Finland | Jessica Timgren | Vaillant | 1 | 12 | | | | | |
| 8 | Finland | Sebastian Numminen | Calandor | 4 | eliminated | | | | | |
| 8 | Finland | | | 9 | eliminated | - | | | 600 € | (8) |

(Top 8 of 17 Teams)
Grey penalties points do not count for the team result, in the second round only three riders per team are allowed to start.

== North and South American League ==
=== Final standings ===
The best-placed team of the 2011 North and South American League, Canada, have the permission to start in the 2011 Promotional League Final.

A team of a country that belongs to one of the 2011 Meydan FEI Nations Cup teams can not earn points in this league. Teams who are part of one of the other Promotional Leagues also can not earn points in this league.

| | Team | Points | | | Total |
| | Team | CAN (Canada) | ARG (Argentina) | USA (United States) | Total |
|---|---|---|---|---|---|
| 1 | Canada | 6 | 5 | 7 | 18 |
| 2 | Mexico | 3 | — | 3 | 6 |
| 3 | Argentina | — | 4 | — | 4 |
| 4 | Venezuela | — | — | 2 | 2 |
| 5 | Colombia | — | — | 1 | 1 |
| 6 | Chile | — | 0 | — | 0 |

=== Results ===
==== FEI Nations Cup of Canada (2010) ====
CSIO 5* – September 8, 2010 to September 12, 2010 – Spruce Meadows, Calgary, Canada
Competition: Saturday, September 11, 2010 at 12:00 pm

| | Team | Rider | Horse | Round A | Round B | Total penalties | Jump-off | | Prize money Can$ | scoring points |
| | Team | Rider | Horse | Penalties | Penalties | Total penalties | Penalties | Time (s) | Prize money Can$ | scoring points |
|---|---|---|---|---|---|---|---|---|---|---|
| 1 | United States | Rich Fellers | Flexible | 4 | 0 | | | | | |
| 1 | United States | Ashlee Bond | Cadett | 8 | eliminated | | | | | |
| 1 | United States | Richard Spooner | Cristallo | 4 | 4 | | | | | |
| 1 | United States | Beezie Madden | Coral Reef Via Volo | 0 | 5 | | | | | |
| 1 | United States | | | 8 | 9 | 17 | | | Can$115,000 | - |
| 2 | Ireland | Trevor Breen | Adventure de Kannan | 8 | 4 | | | | | |
| 2 | Ireland | Nicola Fitzgibbon | Puissance | 0 | 4 | | | | | |
| 2 | Ireland | David Quigley | Ulot | 5 | 5 | | | | | |
| 2 | Ireland | Shane Sweetnam | Amaretto D'Arco | 4 | 4 | | | | | |
| 2 | Ireland | | | 9 | 12 | 21 | | | Can$75,000 | - |
| 3 | Canada | John Anderson | Terrific | 8 | 8 | | | | | |
| 3 | Canada | Jonathon Millar | Contino | 1 | 8 | | | | | |
| 3 | Canada | Yann Candele | Pitareusa | 8 | 8 | | | | | |
| 3 | Canada | Eric Lamaze | Hickstead | 0 | 0 | | | | | |
| 3 | Canada | | | 9 | 16 | 25 | | | Can$50,000 | 6 |
| 4 | Switzerland | Werner Muff | Campione CH | 5 | 4 | | | | | |
| 4 | Switzerland | Dehlia Oeuvray-Smits | Cerano von Hof CH | eliminated | 5 | | | | | |
| 4 | Switzerland | Claudia Gisler | Touchable | 8 | 8 | | | | | |
| 4 | Switzerland | Pius Schwizer | Ulysse X | 4 | 0 | | | | | |
| 4 | Switzerland | | | 17 | 9 | 26 | | | Can$32,500 | - |
| 4 | Netherlands | Gerco Schröder | Pennsylvania | 8 | 5 | | | | | |
| 4 | Netherlands | Piet Raijmakers jr. | Lys Platiere | 0 | 17 | | | | | |
| 4 | Netherlands | Nathalie van der Mei | Tersina | 13 | 13 | | | | | |
| 4 | Netherlands | Jeroen Dubbeldam | Simon | 0 | 0 | | | | | |
| 4 | Netherlands | | | 8 | 18 | 26 | | | Can$32,500 | - |

(Top 5 of 8 Teams)

==== FEI Nations Cup of Argentina (2010) ====
CSIO 2*-W – November 9, 2010 to November 14, 2010 – Haras El Capricho, Capilla del Señor, Argentina
Competition: Friday, November 12, 2010 – Start: 3:30 pm, prize money: 12000 Arg$

| | Team | Rider | Horse | Round A | Round B | Total penalties | Jump-off | | Prize arg$ | scoring points |
| | Team | Rider | Horse | Penalties | Penalties | Total penalties | Penalties | Time (s) | Prize arg$ | scoring points |
|---|---|---|---|---|---|---|---|---|---|---|
| 1 | United States | Megan Edrick | Cadence | 4 | 12 | | | | | |
| 1 | United States | John McConell | Katie Riddle | 0 | 4 | | | | | |
| 1 | United States | Lucy Davis | Nemo | 4 | 0 | | | | | |
| 1 | United States | Saer Coulter | Chalan | 8 | | | | | | |
| 1 | United States | | | 8 | 16 | 24 | | | 6,000 arg$ | - |
| 2 | Canada | Lisa Carlsen | La Boom | 6 | 13 | | | | | |
| 2 | Canada | Lauren Hunkin | Larry | 5 | 12 | | | | | |
| 2 | Canada | Angela Covert-Laurence | Utan | 1 | 0 | | | | | |
| 2 | Canada | Samantha Buirs | Total Touch | 18 | | | | | | |
| 2 | Canada | | | 12 | 25 | 37 | | | 4,000 arg$ | 5 |
| 3 | Argentina I | Carlos Quinones | Dalai | 13 | 9 | | | | | |
| 3 | Argentina I | Martin Dopazo | Bonjour | 8 | 8 | | | | | |
| 3 | Argentina I | Ricardo Dircie | Llavaneras H.J. Aries | 5 | 0 | | | | | |
| 3 | Argentina I | Leandro Moschini | Gama Zarello | eliminated | | | | | | |
| 3 | Argentina I | | | 26 | 17 | 43 | | | 2,000 arg$ | 4 |

(Top 3 of 6 Teams)

==== FEI Nations Cup of the United States ====
CSIO 4* – March 3, 2011 to March 6, 2011 – Wellington, Florida, United States
Competition: Friday, March 4, 2011

| | Team | Rider | Horse | Round A | Round B | Total penalties | Jump-off | | Prize money US$ | scoring points |
| | Team | Rider | Horse | Penalties | Penalties | Total penalties | Penalties | Time (s) | Prize money US$ | scoring points |
|---|---|---|---|---|---|---|---|---|---|---|
| 1 | United States | McLain Ward | Sapphire | 0 | 0 | | | | | |
| 1 | United States | Mario Deslauriers | Urico | 4 | | | | | | |
| 1 | United States | Margie Engle | Indigo | 0 | 4 | | | | | |
| 1 | United States | Beezie Madden | Coral Reef Via Volo | 4 | 0 | | | | | |
| 1 | United States | | | 4 | 4 | 8 | | | | - |
| 2 | Canada | Jonathon Millar | Contino | 4 | 0 | | | | | |
| 2 | Canada | Yann Candele | Pitareusa | 8 | | | | | | |
| 2 | Canada | Ian Millar | Star Power | 4 | 4 | | | | | |
| 2 | Canada | Eric Lamaze | Sidoline van de Centaur | 0 | 4 | | | | | |
| 2 | Canada | | | 8 | 8 | 16 | | | | 7 |
| 3 | Ireland | Darragh Kenny | Gael Force | 8 | 4 | | | | | |
| 3 | Ireland | Jennifer Crooks | Uryadi | 10 | 4 | | | | | |
| 3 | Ireland | Paul O'Shea | Realman | 9 | | | | | | |
| 3 | Ireland | Shane Sweetnam | Rolette | 4 | 8 | | | | | |
| 3 | Ireland | | | 21 | 16 | 37 | | | | - |
| 3 | Great Britain | Nick Skelton | Carlos | 0 | 4 | | | | | |
| 3 | Great Britain | Gemma Paternoster | Osiris | 8 | 9 | | | | | |
| 3 | Great Britain | Scott Brash | Bon Ami | 13 | | | | | | |
| 3 | Great Britain | Ben Maher | Tripple X | 12 | 4 | | | | | |
| 3 | Great Britain | | | 20 | 17 | 37 | | | | - |
| 3 | Australia | Harley Brown | Cassiato | 4 | 13 | | | | | |
| 3 | Australia | Thaisa Erwin | Wadisson | 29 | | | | | | |
| 3 | Australia | Damian Guthrie | Gilmore | 12 | 8 | | | | | |
| 3 | Australia | James Paterson-Robinson | Niack de L’Abbaye | 0 | 0 | | | | | |
| 3 | Australia | | | 16 | 21 | 37 | | | | - |

(Top 5 of 8 Teams)

== Promotional League Final ==
The best-placed team of the 2011 Promotional League Final move into the 2012 FEI Nations Cup.

== Sources / External links ==
- 2011 rules
