= British Open Show Jumping Championships =

The British Open Show Jumping Championships were launched in 2003 and have been held indoors during April of every year since.

For the first four years they were held at Sheffield Arena before moving to the NEC Arena, Birmingham in 2007.

The Championships have a unique competition format with the champion being determined by ongoing placings in three qualifying rounds and the final. The British Open title has become much coveted. One of the reasons for this is its policy of only inviting the top British and international show jumpers to compete. In its international classes, only the best (as defined by the British Showjumping Association) can participate.

The British Open also hosts national show jumping classes and is the Final for the BSJA Winter Grand Prix and the BEF Under 23 Classic and Championship.

In 2011 the British Open Show Jumping did not run because the organizer had not had one profitable year in the last eight years.

== Previous British Open Champions ==
- 2003 Robert Whitaker (United Kingdom)
- 2004 Nick Skelton (United Kingdom)
- 2005 Robert Smith (United Kingdom)
- 2006 Robert Smith (United Kingdom)
- 2007 Jessica Kurten (Republic of Ireland)
- 2008 Robert Whitaker (United Kingdom)
- 2009 Robert Whitaker (United Kingdom)
- 2010 Ellen Whitaker (United Kingdom)
