= John Whitaker (equestrian) =

British equestrian (born 1955)

John Whitaker MBE
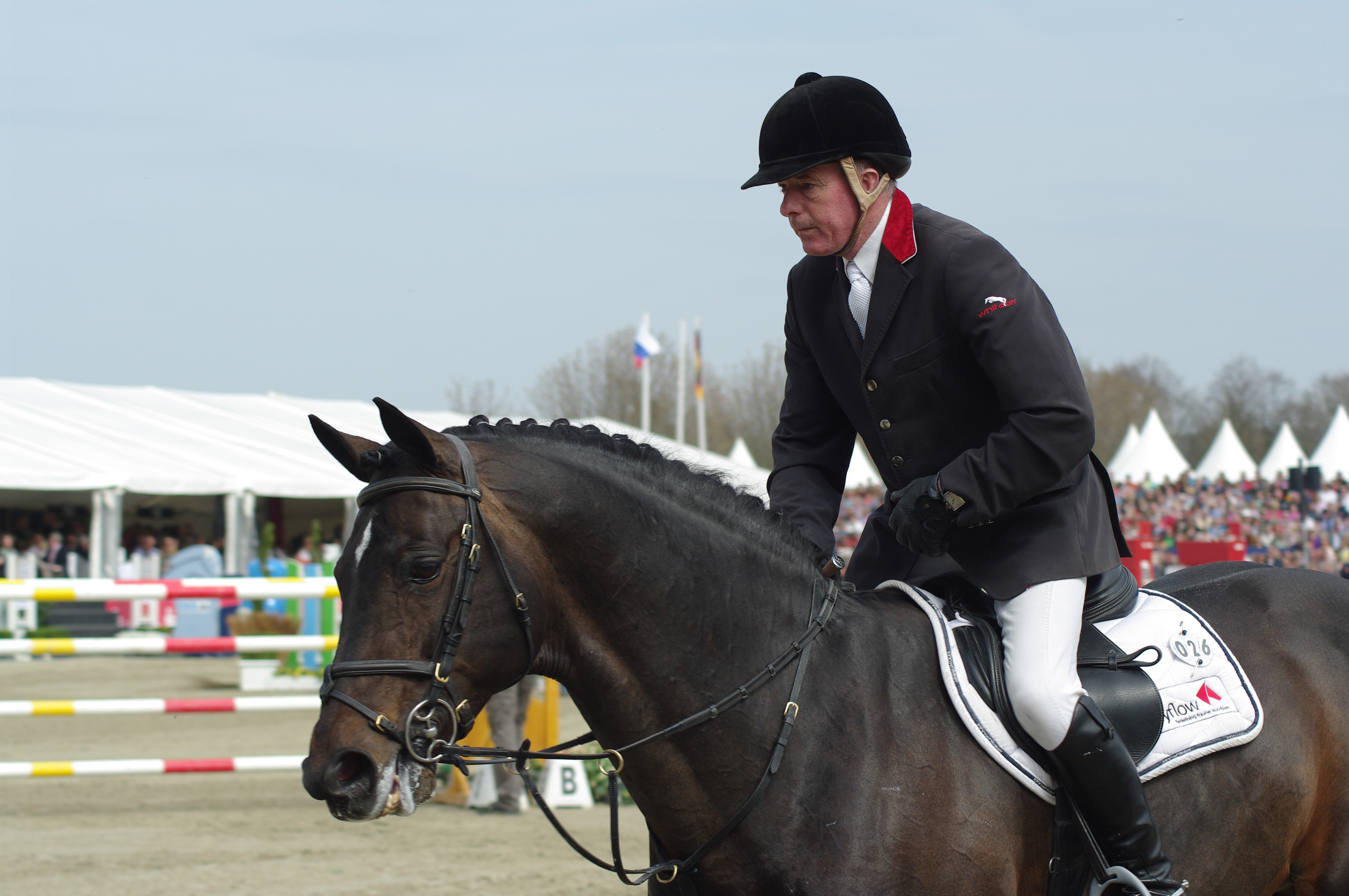
- Whitaker on Argento

Personal information
- Born: 5 August 1955 (age 70)
- Website: johnwhitakerhorses.com

Sport
- Sport: Equestrianism
- Event: Show jumping
Medal record
Equestrian
Representing Great Britain
Alternative Olympics
Silver medal – second place	1980 Rotterdam	Jumping Team
Silver medal – second place	1980 Rotterdam	Jumping Individual
Olympic Games
Silver medal – second place	1984 Los Angeles	Team jumping
World Championships
Bronze medal – third place	1982 Dublin	Jumping Team
Silver medal – second place	1986 Aachen	Jumping Team
Bronze medal – third place	1990 Stockholm	Jumping Team
Silver medal – second place	1990 Stockholm	Jumping Individual
Bronze medal – third place	1998 Rome	Jumping Team
European Championships
Silver medal – second place	1983 Hickstead	Jumping Team
Silver medal – second place	1983 Hickstead	Jumping Individual
Gold medal – first place	1985 Dinard	Jumping Team
Bronze medal – third place	1985 Dinard	Jumping Individual
Gold medal – first place	1987 St Gallen	Jumping Team
Silver medal – second place	1987 St Gallen	Jumping Individual
Gold medal – first place	1989 Rotterdam	Jumping Team
Gold medal – first place	1989 Rotterdam	Jumping Individual
Silver medal – second place	1991 La Baule	Jumping Team
Silver medal – second place	1993 Gijon	Jumping Team
Silver medal – second place	1995 St Gallen	Jumping Team
Bronze medal – third place	1997 Mannheim	Jumping Team
Bronze medal – third place	2007 Mannheim	Jumping Team
Bronze medal – third place	2011 Madrid	Jumping Team

John Whitaker MBE (born 5 August 1955, Huddersfield) is a British equestrian and Olympian who competes in show jumping. He has won numerous international medals including an olympic silver medal at the 1984 Summer Olympics held in Los Angeles. He is the managing director of John Whitaker International Limited which produces tack and equestrian clothing.

== Showjumping ==
Whitaker has enjoyed success across four decades. He has competed at World and European Championships and five olympic teams between 1984 and 2016. He has won the Hickstead Derby four times.

"In this sport you lose more than you win, and you need to learn to cope with that. You have to be able to pick yourself up and come back and try another day." —John Whitaker

== Horses ==
He is best known for his partnership with the horse Milton with whom he won the Du Maunier Grand Prix at Spruce Meadows and won over £1 million in prize money before being retired in 1994. He won an Olympic medal in 1984 on Ryan's Son who he was given at the age of 18 and had a partnership with for 14 years.

== Personal life ==
The Whitaker family is well known for showjumping. Whitaker is married to Clare Barr and has three children, including Robert Whitaker. His niece Ellen Whitaker, nephews William Whitaker and Donald Whitaker, as well as John's younger brother Michael Whitaker, and his son Jack Whitaker are also show jumpers.

Whitaker began riding at the age of 6, taught by his mother, who ran a riding school. As children, he and his brother Michael delivered milk using a horse and cart until they were 16 and began to show jump professionally.

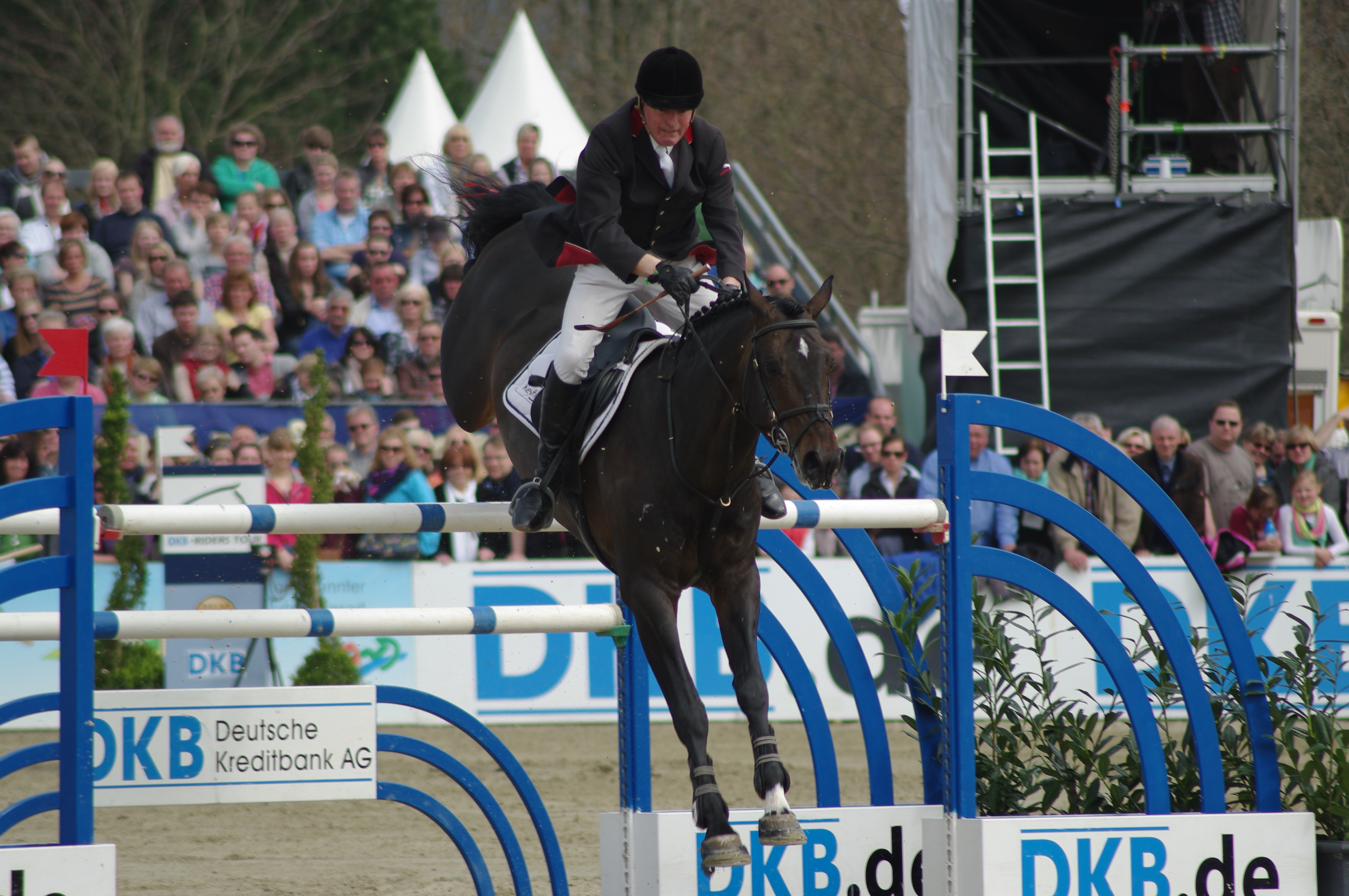
On Argento (2013)

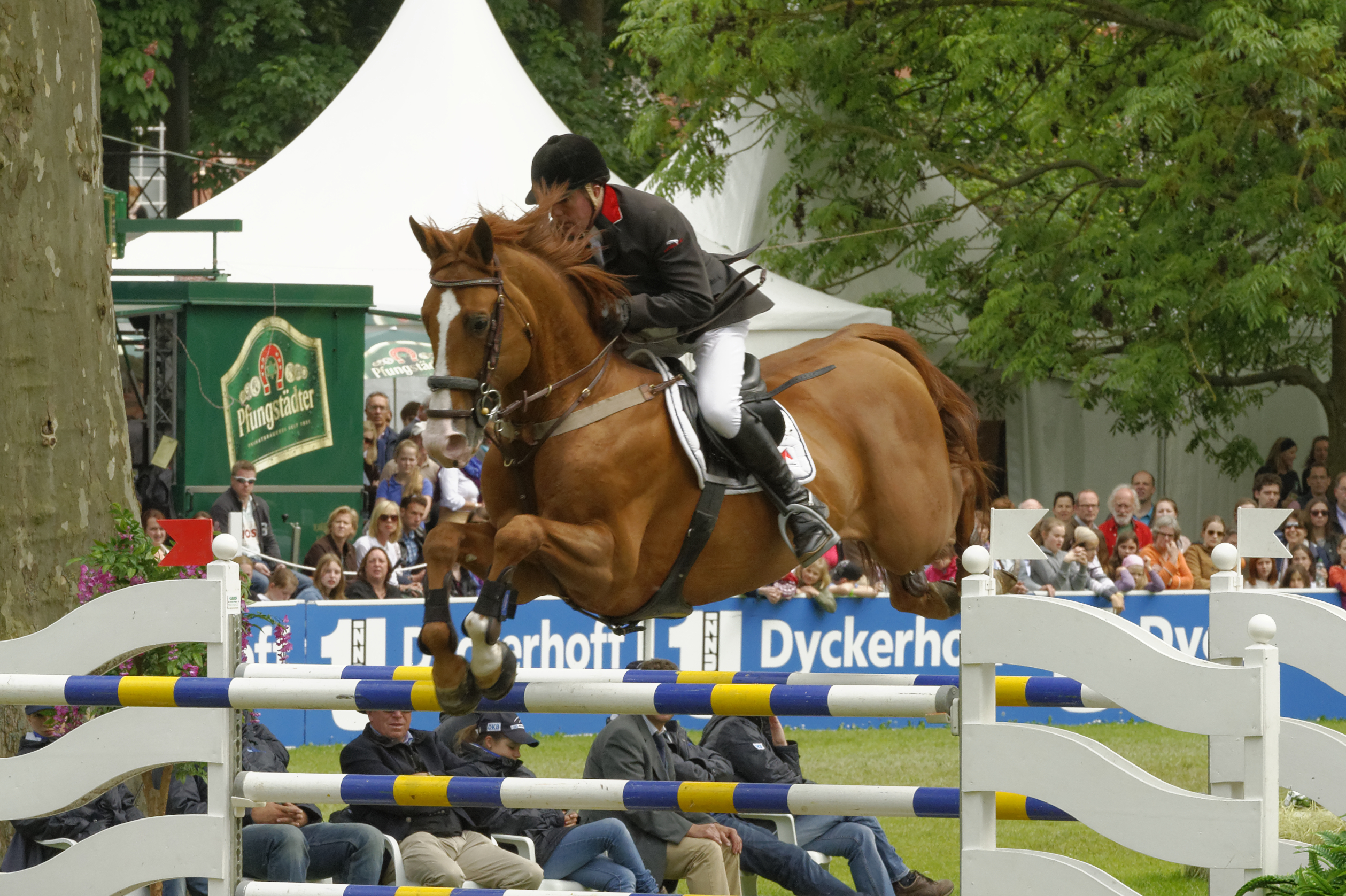
On Maximilian (2013)

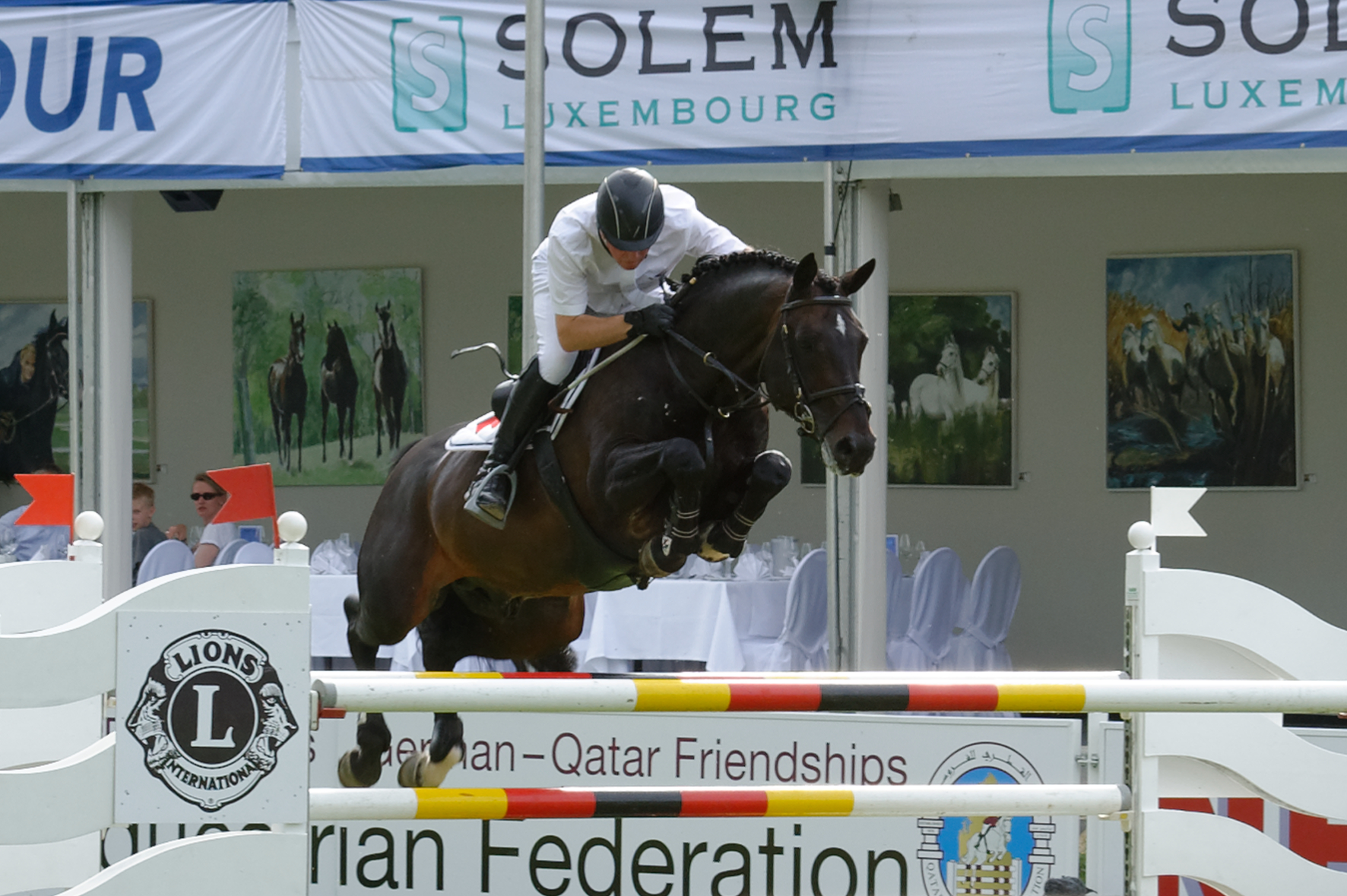
On Argento (2014)

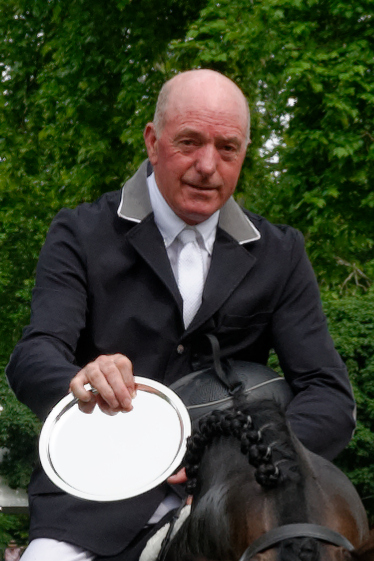
Won CCI3* on Argento (2014)

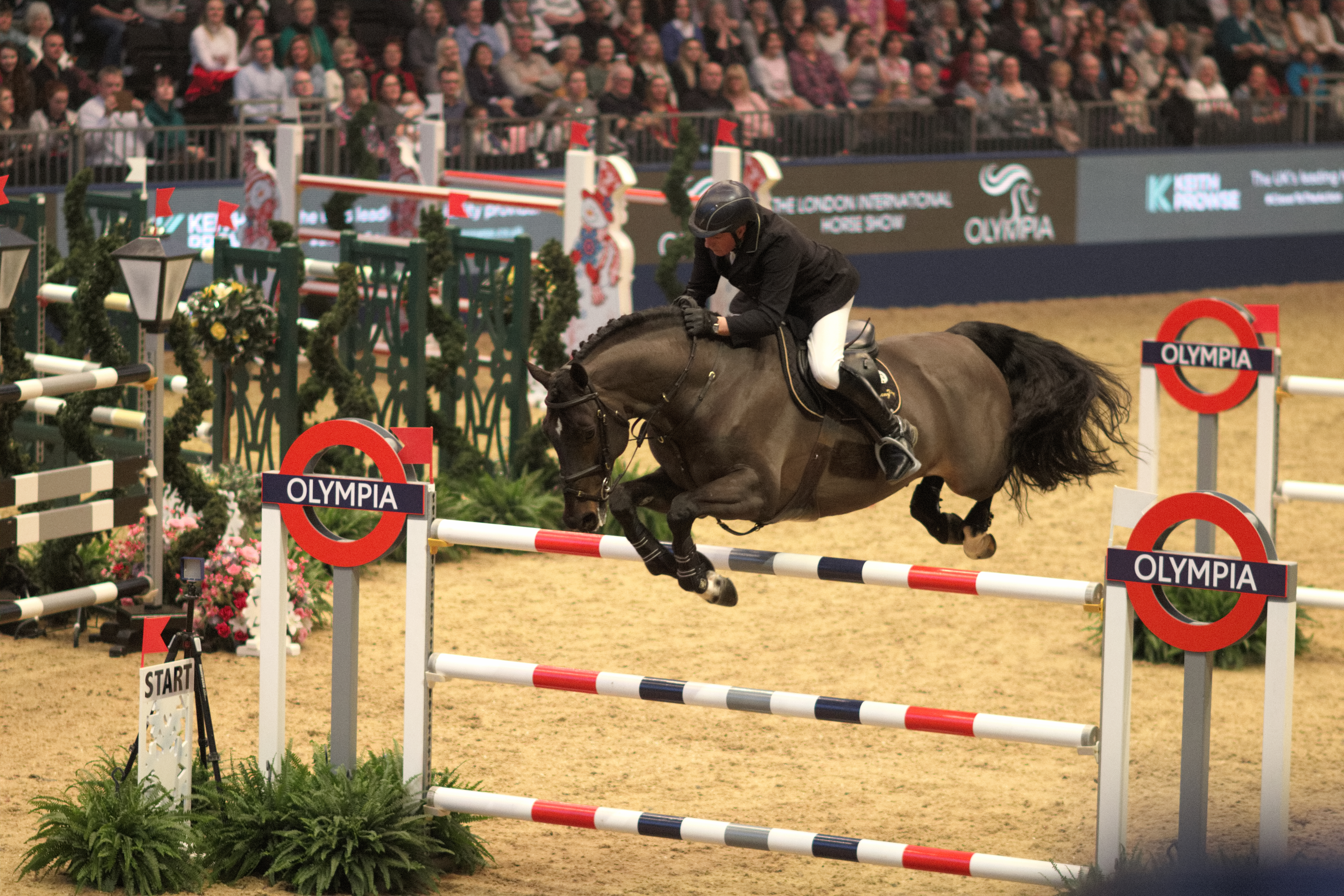
On Argento (2017)
