= Equestrian at the 2018 Summer Youth Olympics – Team jumping =

2018 event

Team jumping at the III Summer Youth Olympic Games
- Venue: Argentine Equestrian Club
- Dates: 8–9 October
- Competitors: 30 from 30 nations

Medalists
1st place, gold medalist(s)		Nicole Meyer Robredo; Mateo Philippe Coles; Marissa del Pilar Thompson; Pedro Espinosa; Mattie Hatcher; Mixed-NOCs
2nd place, silver medalist(s)		Jack Whitaker; Giacomo Casadei; Vince Jármy; Rowen van de Mheen; Simon Jan Morssinkhof; Mixed-NOCs
3rd place, bronze medalist(s)		Ahmed Nasser Elnaggar; Brianagh Lindsay Clark; Anna Bunty Howard; Hannah Ivy Carton; Margaux Koenig; Mixed-NOCs

These are the results for the Team jumping event at the 2018 Summer Youth Olympics.

== Schedule ==
All times are local (UTC−3).

Date	Time	Round
Monday, 8 October	14:00	Round 1
Tuesday, 9 October	14:00	Round 2
Tuesday, 9 October	15:30	Jump-off

== Results ==
Rank	Team	Penalties Round 1		Penalties Round 2		Total Penalties	Jump-off			
Rank	Team	Ind	Team	Ind	Team	Total Penalties	Pen	Team	Time	Team
1st place, gold medalist(s)	North America; Nicole Meyer Robredo (MEX); Mateo Philippe Coles (HAI); Marissa del Pilar Thompson (PAN); Pedro Espinosa (HON); Mattie Hatcher (USA)	4 # 0; 0; 0; 0 #	0	4 # 0; 0; 4 # 0	0	0	4 # 0 # 0; 0; 0	0	38.07 # 34.55 # 34.07; 32.16; 31.66	97.89
2nd place, silver medalist(s)	Europe; Jack Whitaker (GBR); Giacomo Casadei (ITA); Vince Jármy (HUN); Rowen van de Mheen (NED); Simon Jan Morssinkhof (BEL)	0; 0; 4 # 0; 0 #	0	4 # 0; 0; 0; 4 #	0	0	4 # 0 # 0; 0; 0	0	38.31 # 37.85 # 34.99; 34.79; 31.80	101.58
3rd place, bronze medalist(s)	Africa; Ahmed Nasser Elnaggar (EGY); Brianagh Lindsay Clark (ZIM); Anna Bunty Howard (ZAM); Hannah Ivy Garton (RSA); Margaux Koenig (MRI)	4 # 1; 0; 8 # 0	1	4 # 0; 0; 4 # 0	0	1				
4	South America; Philip Mattos Botelho (BRA); Bernardo Lander (VEN); Gonzalo Bedoya (BOL); Agostina Llano Zuccolillo (PAR); Richard Kierkegaard (ARG)	12 # 4; 4 # 0; 0	4	0; 4 # 0; 0; 0	0	4				
4	Australasia; Madeline Sinderberry (AUS); Briar Burnett-Grant (NZL); Omar Almarzooqi (UAE); Arshia Najafinia (IRI); Mohammed Alqashouti (QAT)	0; 0; 4 # 0; 20 #	0	0; 4; 0; 4 # 28 #	4	4				
6	Asia; Sara Hussein Saleh Al Armouti (JOR); Edgar Fung (HKG); Momen Zindaki (SYR); In Shaallah Hameed (IRQ); Abdushukur Sobirjonov (UZB)	13 # 0; 0; 4; 8 #	4	1; 4; 0; 4 # 4 #	5	9				
