= Michael Whitaker =

British equestrian (born 1960)

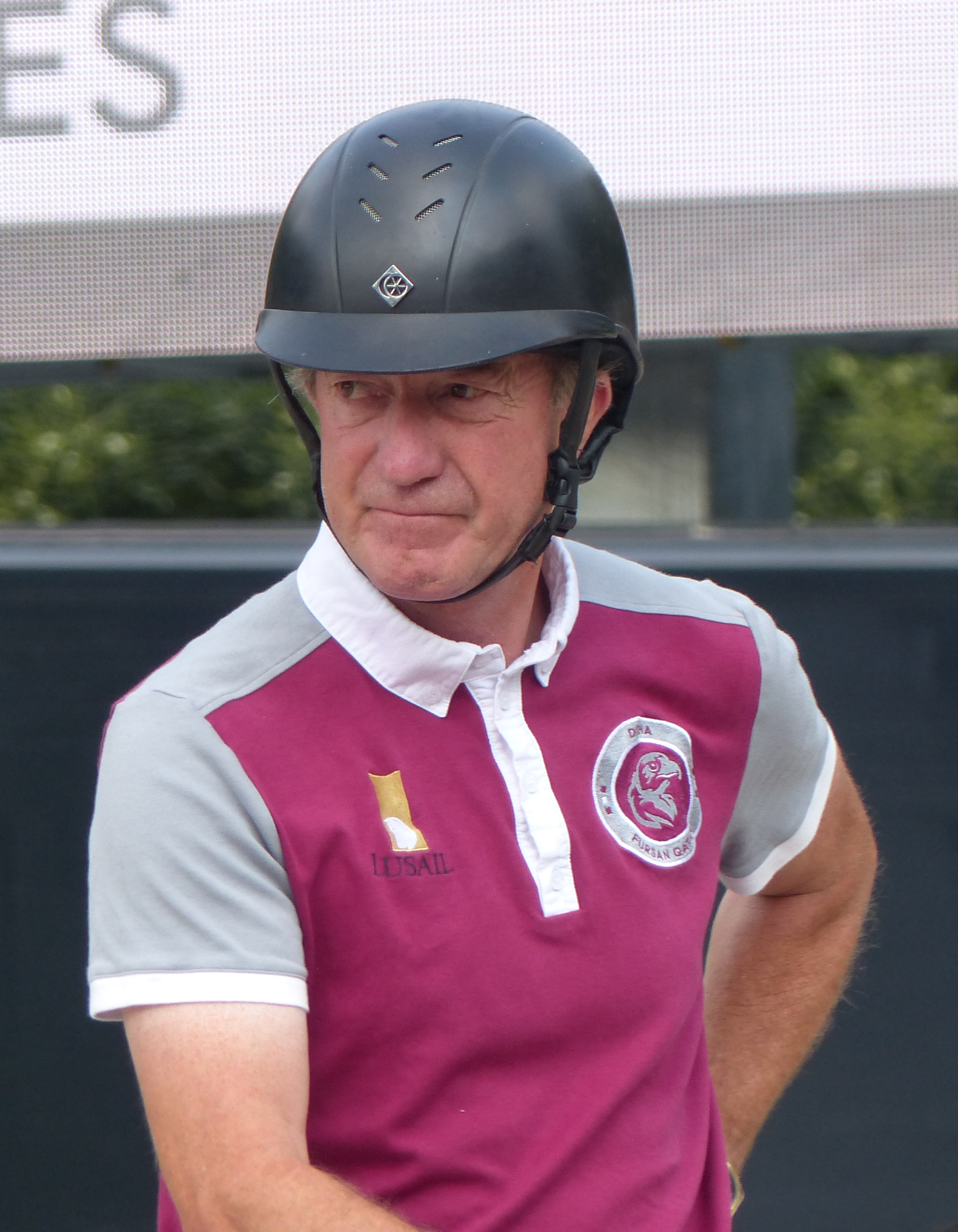

Personal information
- Nationality: Great Britain
- Discipline: Show jumping
- Born: 17 March 1960 (age 65); Huddersfield
- Height: 5.7 ft 0 in (1.74 m)
- Weight: 152 lb (69 kg; 10 st 12 lb)
Medal record
Equestrian
Representing Great Britain
Olympic Games
Silver medal – second place	1984 Los Angeles	Team jumping
World Championships
Silver medal – second place	1986 Aachen	Team jumping
Bronze medal – third place	1990 Stockholm	Team jumping
European Championships
Gold medal – first place	1985 Dinard	Team jumping
Gold medal – first place	1987 St. Gallen	Team jumping
Gold medal – first place	1989 Rotterdam	Team jumping
Gold medal – first place	2013 Herning	Team jumping
Silver medal – second place	1989 Rotterdam	Individual jumping
Silver medal – second place	1991 La Baule-Escoublac	Team jumping
Silver medal – second place	1993 Gijón	Team jumping
Silver medal – second place	1995 St. Gallen	Team jumping
Silver medal – second place	1995 St. Gallen	Individual jumping
Bronze medal – third place	1993 Gijón	Individual jumping
Bronze medal – third place	1997 Mannheim	Team jumping
Bronze medal – third place	2007 Mannheim	Team jumping

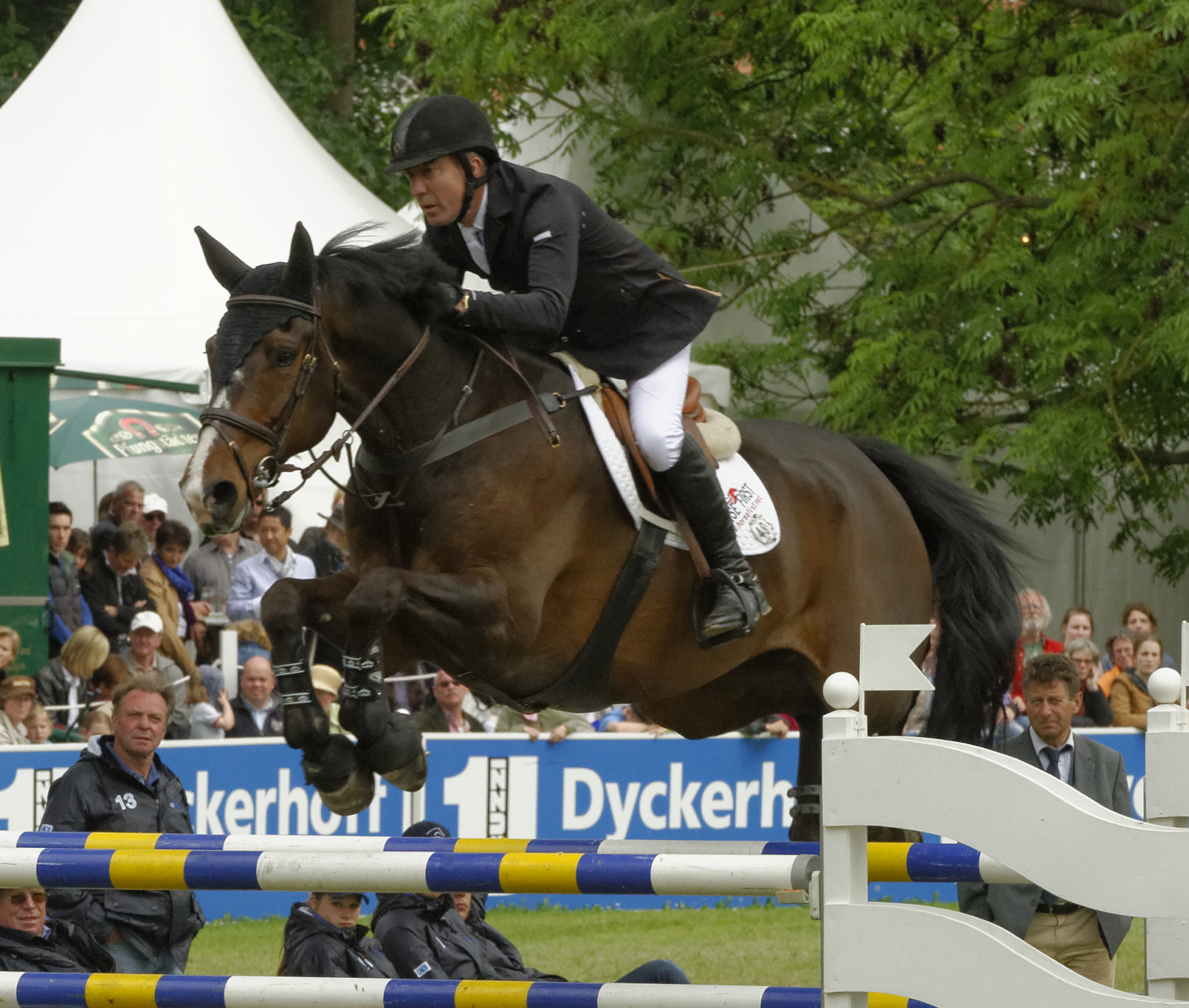
Whitaker with Amai at Internationalen Pfingstturnier Wiesbaden in 2013

Michael Whitaker (born 17 March 1960) is a British Olympic equestrian rider, who competes in the sport of show jumping. He was ranked 5th by the British Showjumping Association in March 2014.

== Career ==
Younger brother of John Whitaker, Michael began competing on ponies at the age of 5. At the age of 16, he made his debut in international competitions and in 1980 he became the second youngest winner of the Hickstead Derby, at the age of 20. In September 1993 he took over from his brother John as the internationally top-ranked show jumping rider.

In 2009 Whitaker was banned from competition for four months after his stallion Tackeray tested positive for a synthetic hormone altrenogest during a competition in France. Altrenogest is a female hormone that Whitaker claimed was present in the sample due to a mix up in feed buckets. Whitaker was found to be negligent for the positive test.

== Personal life ==
Born and raised on his parents' farm in Yorkshire. He and his three brothers were taught to ride by their mother Enid, a keen horsewoman. Michael began riding aged three on a Shetland pony named Hercules.

In December 1980, Whitaker married Belgian show jumper Veronique. They separated in 1997, and later divorced.

He married his second wife on 13 August 2013. They live in Whatton, Nottinghamshire with their children. Their son Jack is also a show jumper. His niece Ellen and nephews Donald, Robert and William are also show jumpers.

== Major achievements ==
- 1984: Olympic Games, Los Angeles. Team Silver medal with Overton Amanda
- 1985: European Championships, Dinard. Team Gold medal with Warren Point
- 1986: World Championships, Aachen. Team Silver medal with Warren Point
- 1987: European Championships, St. Gallen. Team Gold Medal with Overton Amanda
- 1989: European Championships, Rotterdam. Team Gold Medal and individual silver medal with Mon Santa
- 1990: World Equestrian Games, Stockholm. Team Bronze medal with Mon Santa
- 1991: European Championships, La Baule-Escoublac. Team Silver medal with Mon Santa
- 1993: European Championships, Gijón. Team Silver medal and individual bronze with Midnight Madness
- 1994: World Cup Final, 's-Hertogenbosch. 3rd place with Midnight Madness
- 1995: European Championships, St. Gallen. Silver medals in team and individual with Two Step
- 1997: European Championships, Mannheim. Team Bronze Medal with Ashley
- 2001: World Cup Final, Gothenburg. 3rd place with Handel II
- 2005: World Cup Final, Las Vegas 2nd place with Portofino 63
- 2007: European Championships, Mannheim. Team Bronze Medal with Portofino 63
