= Lauren Hunkin =

Canadian equestrian

Personal information
- Nationality: Canada
- Discipline: Show jumping
- Born: August 29, 1979 (age 47)
Medal record
Representing Canada
Equestrian
FEI Nations Cup of Argentina (2010)
Silver medal – second place	2010 Argentina	Team jumping

Lauren Hunkin (born August 29, 1979) is a Canadian show jumper.

== Career ==
Lauren spent several years training full-time with Canada's Olympic Silver medalist, Ian Millar. Lauren completed her first full year of Grand Prix competitions in 2006, earning four top 5 placings and finishing second in the Eastern Conference of the national Grand Prix series, The Kubota Cup. In 2008, Lauren had back to back wins on the Grand Prix circuit. In June 2008, Lauren was named Cavalor's "Athlete of the Month" by Equine Canada. In May 2010, Lauren was again named "Athlete of the Month" by Equine Canada. 2010 wins include Grand Prixs in St. Lazare, Blainville, and the $90,000 Summer Festival in Palgrave. She represented Canada at the 2010 Nations Cup of Argentina, winning a silver medal.

Since September 2009, she has coached the University of Ottawa Equestrian team. Since her involvement, the team has grown from 12 members to more than 40 riders and two show teams. The team competes in the Intercollegiate Horse Show Association (IHSA), and the Ontario University Equestrian Association (OUEA) leagues.

Her horse is a German-bred gelding named Larry

== Personal life ==
She currently lives in Ottawa, Ontario.
