= Joe Stockdale =

British equestrian

Joseph Stockdale
Personal information
- Nationality: British
- Born: 18 October 1999 (age 26)

Sport
- Sport: Equestrian
- Event: Show jumping
Medal record
Equestrian
Representing Great Britain
World Championships
Bronze medal – third place	2022 Herning	Team jumping

Joseph Stockdale (born 18 October 1999) is a British show jumper.

== Early life ==
From Roade, Northamptonshire, his father Tim Stockdale was also a show jumper. His brother Mark Stockdale is a professional golfer. Stockdale attended Wellingborough School.

Stockdale started riding in a pony club when he was four years-old. He took part in the mounted games team at the Horse of the Year Show in 2013. As a teenager, he played cricket for Northamptonshire County Cricket Club Second XI.

== Career ==
Stockdale started competing professionally in 2018, and was named Young British Rider of the Year in 2022.

He made his senior championship team debut at the 2021 European Championship.

He won team bronze at the 2022 FEI World Championships in Herning, Denmark, alongside Ben Maher, Scott Brash and Harry Charles.

In 2023, he and Jack Whitaker became official ambassadors for the Royal Windsor Horse Show.

In May 2024, he was placed on the list of British showjumping Olympic entries for the 2024 Paris Games. The following month, he was confirmed as one of the four riders selected to represent Great Britain at the 2024 Olympic Games.

He was part of the British team, alongside Ben Maher, Matt Sampson, and Donald Whitaker, that won the FEI Nations Cup in Calgary, Canada in September 2025, the first British team to win for close to thirty years, since the British team of 1996.
