= 2011 Promotional League Final =

The 2011 Promotional League Final, the third Promotional League Final, was held in Barcelona, Spain, on September 25, 2011 at 3:30 pm during the 2011 CSIO Barcelona (CSIO 5*). It was the 100th time a horse show is held at Barcelona, first time in 1902. A purse of € 90,000 was offered at the Promotional League Final, with each of the seven competing teams receiving a share.

== Qualified and competing teams ==
The qualified teams of the 2011 Promotional League Final was:

- from Western and Middle Europe and some other regions without own Promotional League (The second-placed to fourth-placed nations of the European Promotional League):
  - Sweden
  - Italy
  - Spain
- from Eastern Europe and some other regions without own Promotional League (The first placed to third-placed nations of the Challengers League):
  - Ukraine
  - Turkey
  - Poland
- from America (the best-placed nation of the North and South American League):
  - Canada

The team of Turkey didn't start in the 2011 Promotional League Final. Because they didn't start, Russia (fifth-placed nation of the Challengers League) had the chance to start in the final.

== Result ==
The best-placed team of this competition, Sweden, move into the 2012 FEI Nations Cup. Also Switzerland was promoted to the 2012 FEI Nations Cup because of their victory in the 2011 European Promotional League (best team after six competitions).

	Team	Rider	Horse	Round A	Round B	Total penalties	Prize money €
	Team	Rider	Horse	Penalties	Penalties	Total penalties	Prize money €
1	Sweden	Malin Baryard-Johnsson	Tornesch	0	4		
1	Sweden	Angelica Augustsson	Mic Mac du Tillard	4	4		
1	Sweden	Svante Johansson	Caramell KS	4	8		
1	Sweden	Rolf-Göran Bengtsson	Quintero	5	0		
1	Sweden			8	8	16	30,000 €
2	Spain	Rutherford Latham	Nectar du Plessis	1	4		
2	Spain	Antonio Marinas Soto	Al Capone	12	5		
2	Spain	Julio Arias Cueva	Murat de Reve	0	4		
2	Spain	Sergio Alvarez Moya	Wisconsin	12	0		
2	Spain			13	8	21	25,000 €
3	Ukraine	Cassio Rivetti	Verdi	4	5		
3	Ukraine	Oleksandr Onyshchenko	Comte D'Arsouilles	21	retired		
3	Ukraine	Björn Nagel	Niack de L'Abbaye	4	4		
3	Ukraine	Katharina Offel	Vivant	5	0		
3	Ukraine			13	9	22	15,000 €
4	Canada	Chris Pratt	Cruise	4	0		
4	Canada	Jenna Thompson	Zeke	5	8		
4	Canada	Eric Lamaze	Atlete van't Heike	8	0		
4	Canada			17	8	25	5,000 €
5	Italy	Giulia Martinengo Marquet	Chiclana	0	4		
5	Italy	Luca Maria Moneta	Neptune Brecourt	8	12		
5	Italy	Luca Marziani	Wivina	5	0		
5	Italy	Juan Carlos Garcia	Moka de Mescam	12	9		
5	Italy			13	13	26	5,000 €
6	Poland	Antoni Tomaszewski	Trojka	8	20		
6	Poland	Lukasz Wasilewski	Wavantos van de Renvillehoeve	15	9		
6	Poland	Msciwoj Kiecon	Urbane	12	4		
6	Poland			35	33	68	5,000 €
7	Russia	Olga Chechina	Amsterdam	17	12		
7	Russia	Vladimir Beletsky	Littlefoot	4	16		
7	Russia	Vladimir Tuganov	Amarok	9	17		
7	Russia			30	45	75	5,000 €
