= Donald Whitaker =

English show jumper (born 1992)

Personal information
- Nationality: British
- Born: 26 August 1992 (age 33)

Sport
- Sport: Equestrian
Medal record
Equestrian
Representing Great Britain
European Championships
Silver medal – second place	2025 A Coruna	Team Jumping

Donald Whitaker (born 26 August 1992) is a British equestrian who competes as a show jumper.

== Early life ==
He is from Barnsley, Yorkshire, and is part of the Whitaker horse riding family dynasty comprising approximately 15 international showjumpers, which started with his namesake grandfather Donald Whitaker.

== Career ==
In 2018, he won a silver medal at the Young Horse World Championships in Lanaken, Belgium on the horse Chilli. His first CSIO5* Nations Cup appearance was in Abu Dhabi, in 2022, where he jumped a double clear with Di Caprio to help the British team to a third place finish. His senior championship debut came at the 2023 European Show Jumping Championships, on Di Caprio. Be competed on the Global Champions Tour in 2024. That year, he won the CSI5* Spruce Meadows 'North American' event on Uliana 3.

In July 2025, riding Millfield Colette, he was part of the Great Britain side which won the team silver medal behind Belgium at the 2025 European Showjumping Championships in A Coruña, Spain, alongside Scott Brash, Ben Maher and Matt Sampson. That year, he was part of the British team on Millfield Colette, alongside Maher, Sampson, and Joe Stockdale, that won the FEI Nations Cup in Calgary, Canada in September 2025, the first British team to win for close to thirty years since the British team of 1996, including Michael and John Whittaker, triumphed. Millfield Colette and Whitaker rode last and went clear to seal the win.

On Millfield Collette in December 2025, Whittaker was runner-up to Max Kühner on Cooley Jump the Q at the London International Horse Show World Cup leg.

== Personal life ==
He is the son of former show jumper Stephen Whitaker and his wife Carol, and nephew of riders Michael Whitaker and John Whitaker. His sister Ellen Whitaker and brothers Joe and Thomas, as well as cousins Jack, Robert and William, are also show jumpers.

He was based at his uncle Michael's stables as well as that of Darragh Kenny, prior to moving to Germany to be based at the family farm of his equestrian girlfriend, Nicole Pohl, in Dagobertshausen.
