= Victor Bettendorf =

Luxembourgish show jumper

Personal information
- Nationality: Luxembourg
- Born: 19 October 1990 (age 35)

Sport
- Sport: Equestrian

Victor Bettendorf (born 19 October 1990) is a Luxembourgish equestrian who competes in show jumping.

== Early life ==
From Luxembourg, Bettendorf started riding horses at a young age. His mother ran a small riding school, and his father is a vet and a horse breeder. Both his brother and sister are also professional riders.

== Career ==
Bettendorf began riding Sorbier Blanc when the horse was four years-old, the pair going on to compete at the 2015 European Show Jumping Championships in Aachen, and won the 2015 Nations Cup in Celje, Slovenia with Charlotte Bettendorf, Noemie Goergen, and Christian Weier, for Luxembourg. The pair continued together and also competed at the 2019 FEI European Championships in Rotterdam.

Bettendorf recorded 54 international victories in 2022. Riding Mr. Tac, he won his first *5 in February 2023. However, despite qualifying for the 2024 Olympics, at the start of that year the horses owner moved the horse to the Netherlands and he lost his mount for the Olympic Games. In 2024, riding Foxy de la Roque, Bettendorf won the Longines Global Champions Tour event in Rome. Competing in Riyadh at the GC Playoffs in November 2024, Bettendorf and Foxy de la Roque won the 2024 LGCT Super Grand Prix title.

In October 2025, he rode Doha de Riverland to victory at the Longines Global Champions Tour in Rome. In December 2025, riding Cancun Zorel D, Bettendorf won The Reindeer Speed Stakes at the London International Horse Show finishing ahead of Jack Whitaker on Valmy De La Lande. At the show, Bettendorf also had wins on Doha de Riverland, and in the Champagne Taittinger Speed Stakes with Encore Toi du Linon.

== Personal life ==
Bettendorf moved to Germany when he was 24 years-old to pursue a professional riding career. He later married Adeline Hecart and moved to France where they train horses at Haras de la Roque, in Normandy.
