= Matthew Sampson =

English show jumper (born 1990)

Matt Sampson
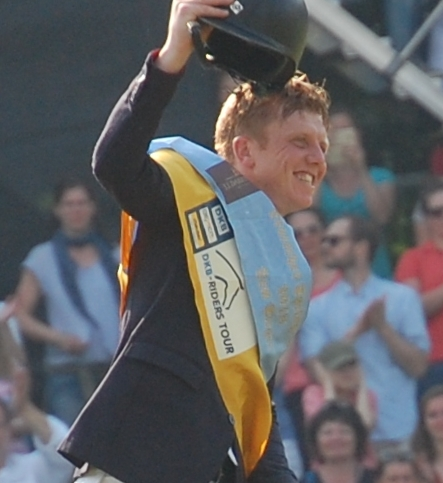
- Sampson in 2018

Personal information
- Full name: Matthew Sampson
- Nationality: British
- Born: 2 August 1990 (age 35)

Sport
- Sport: Equestrian
Medal record
Equestrian
Representing Great Britain
European Championships
Silver medal – second place	2025 A Coruna	Team Jumping

Matthew Sampson (born 2 August 1990) is a British equestrian who competes as a show jumper. He was a silver medalist in the team event at the European Show Jumping Championships in 2025.

== Early life ==
Brought up in Aston near Sheffield, in South Yorkshire, his parents own Parklands Equestrian Centre. He attended Aston Comprehensive School, but left at 12 years-old to be home-schooled. When he was 16 years-old he began to work at the stables of Duncan Inglis.

== Career ==
Riding from a base in North America in 2022 he was awarded Spruce Meadows Rider of the Year after recording 17 wins at the venue. That year, he had his first CSI5* victory. He won $500,000 AON Grand Prix at the Spruce Meadows ‘Pan American’ CSI 5* riding a stallion, Daniel. Following that, he was named 2023 Leading Rider of the Show at the Horse of the Year Show, and he and Daniel won the CSI5* Stakes in London at the Horse of the Year Show at Olympia, and also triumphed at the CSI5* Spruce Meadows Pan American for a second time.

In July 2025, he was part of the Great Britain side which won the team silver medal behind Belgium at the 2025 European Showjumping Championships in A Coruña, Spain, alongside Scott Brash, Ben Maher and Donald Whitaker. He rode Medoc de Toxandria. That year, he was part of the British team, alongside Ben Maher, Joe Stockdale, and Donald Whitaker, that won the FEI Nations Cup in Canada in September 2025, the first British team to win the event for close to thirty years; since the British team of 1996.

In December 2025, he won The Mistletoe Stakes at the London International Horse Show on Balento C.S, winning a five horse jump-off.

== Personal life ==
He met his fiancé, Canadian show jumper Kara Chad, in North America in 2019. In 2020, they set-up his own horse riding and training business, Maplepark Farms. They later moved to base themselves in Britain to run the stable.
