= William Whitaker (equestrian) =

English show jumper

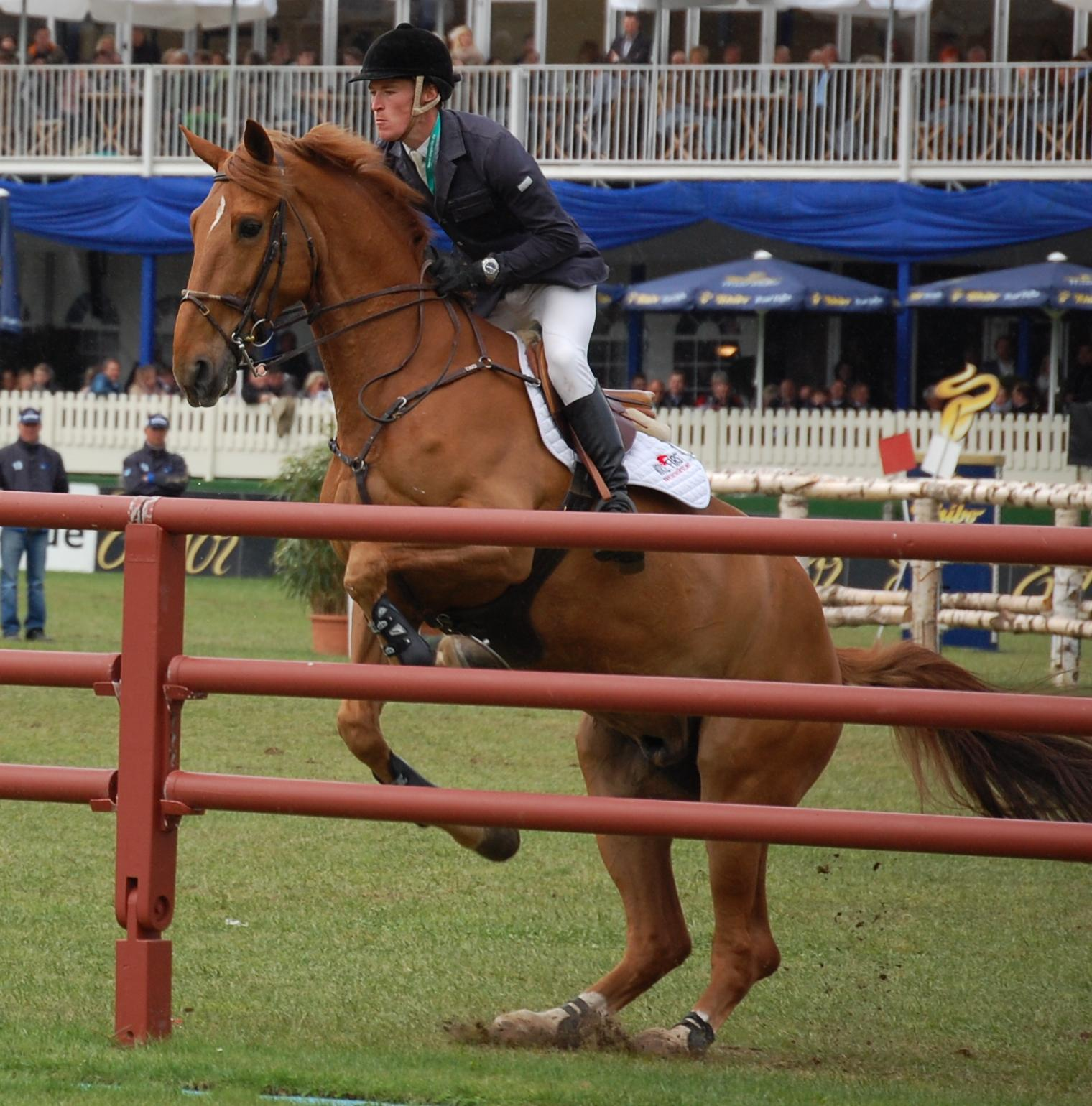
- Whitaker with Glenavadra at the German show jumping derby, Hamburg 2013

Personal information
- Nationality: British
- Born: 26 July 1989 (age 37)

Sport
- Sport: Equestrian

William Whitaker (born 26 July 1989) is an English show jumper from Yorkshire. Whitaker has represented Britain at show jumping.

== Career ==
The son of Ian Whitaker, is from a dynasty of show jumpers and horse trainers including his uncles Michael and John Whitaker, and cousins, Donald, Robert and Ellen.

In 2016 William Whitaker became the third member of his family, after uncles John and Michael, to win the British Jumping Derby at All England Jumping Course at Hickstead, having finished third and second in the previous years events. On 22 December 2018 Whitaker won the FEI Jumping World Cup at the Horse of the Year Show. Riding Utamaro D Ecaussines, the pair finished first after jumping a fast clear round in an eighteen strong jump off.

In June 2025, he was involved in a three horse jump-off on Flamboyant III as his cousin Robert Whitaker ultimately became the fourth member of his family to triumph at the British Jumping Derby at Hickstead. William had also finished second on Flamboyant III in 2024. The following year, again on Flamboyant III, Whittaker won the jump-off for a second Hickstead Derby win.
