= Robert Whitaker (equestrian) =

British show jumper

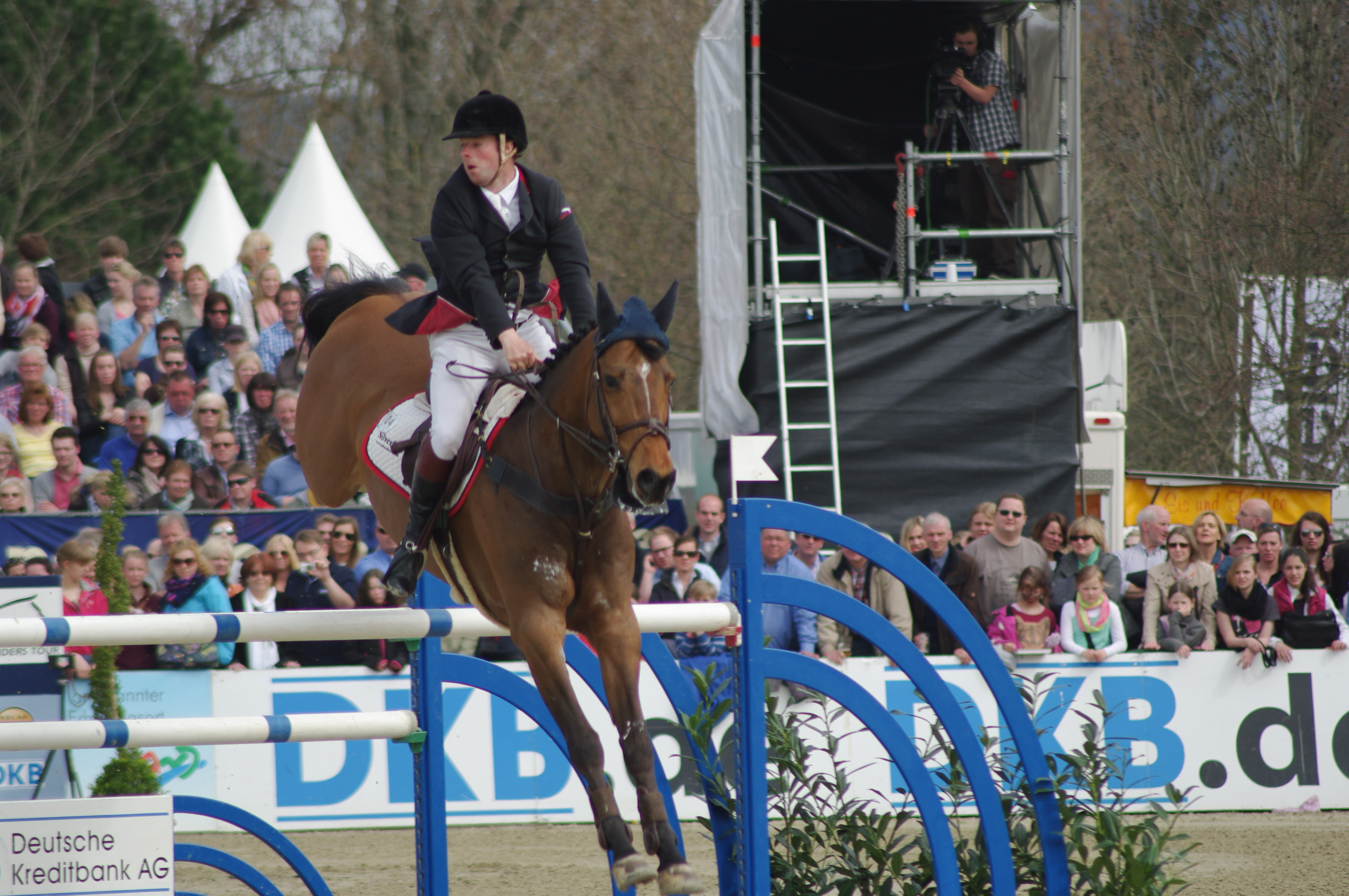

Robert Whitaker (born 26 January 1983) is a British show jumper who rides for the British Team.

== Career ==
Whitaker has represented the British Team many times from junior pony level to the senior ranks.

One of Whitaker's career highlights to date was becoming the British Open Champion at the inaugural British Open Show Jumping Championships in 2003. He has since been crowned champion again in 2008 and 2009. He has now won the title a total of 3 times.

Whitaker has ridden many horses at the highest level. Some of his many horses include Lacroix, his winner at the British Open, and Finbarr, a very successful puissance specialist. He has also previously ridden the horse Arko, now competing successfully with Nick Skelton.

In June 2025, Whitaker became the fourth member of his family, after uncles John and Michael and cousin William, to win the British Jumping Derby at All England Jumping Course at Hickstead winning from a three-way jump off.

== Personal life ==
Whitaker is the son of the John Whitaker, nephew of Michael Whitaker and cousin of Donald, Ellen and William Whitaker.

Whitaker married Kate Jackman in Barbados, on 13 January 2015. They have a daughter.

== Horses ==
=== Current ===
- Lacroix
- Omelli (*1996) Stallion sired by: Burggraf, damsire: Kelly, Owner: Tim Gredley
- Cleopatra VI (*2002), Mare, Father: Skippy II, Owner: Tim Gredley
- Varmisch (*2002), Mare, Father: Hattrick, Mother's Father: Larmisch, Owner: Tim Gredley
- B F Utopia (*1996), Stallion, Father: Lord Z, Owner: Gredley

former show horses:

- Arko
