= Ellen Whitaker =

English show jumping rider

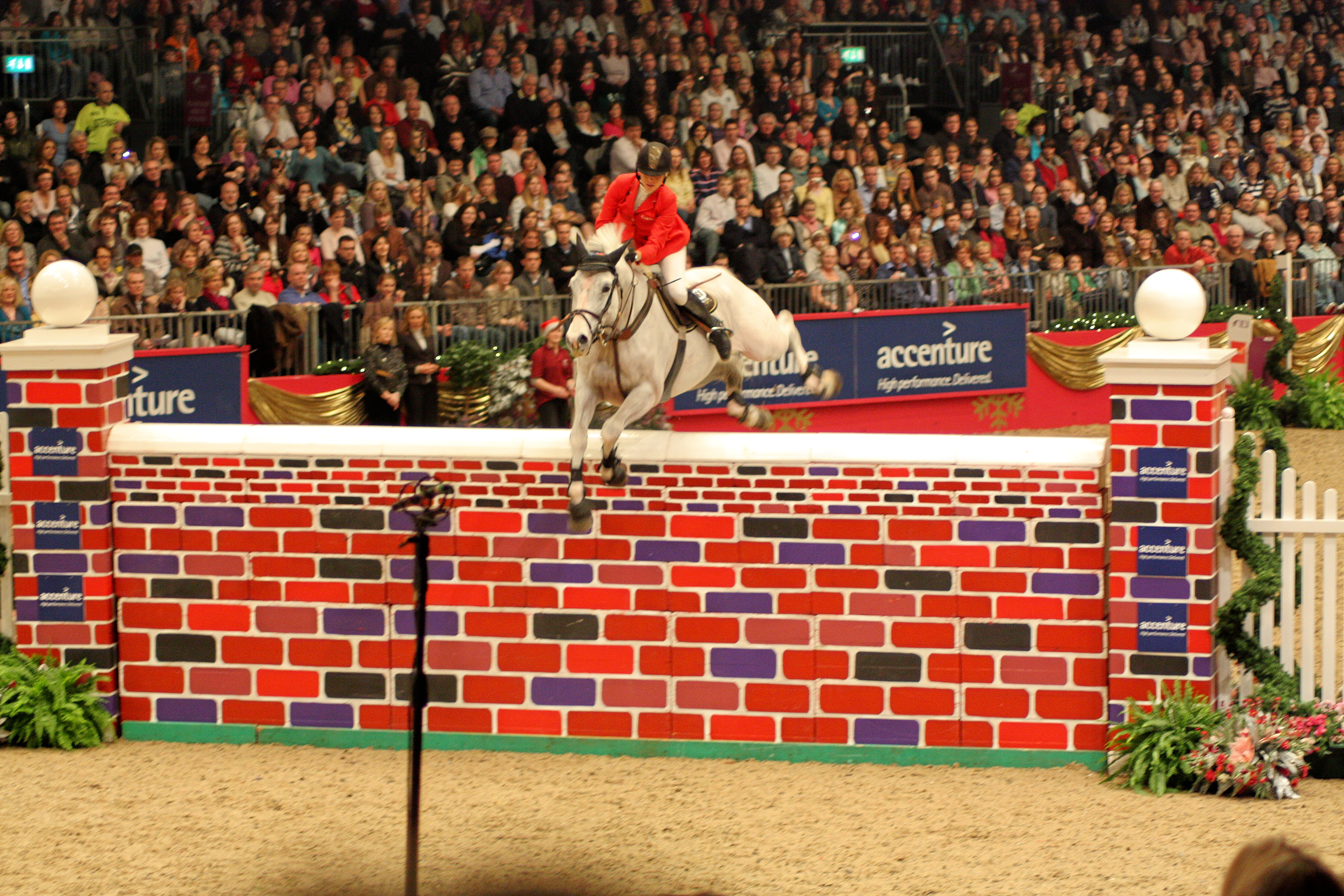

Personal information
- Full name: Ellen Whitaker
- Nationality: Great Britain
- Discipline: Show jumping
- Born: 5 March 1986 (age 39)
- Height: 5 ft 9 in (1.75 m)
Medal record
Representing Great Britain
Equestrian
European Junior Championships
Silver medal – second place	2003 San Remo	Team jumping
European Championships
Bronze medal – third place	2007 Mannheim	Team jumping

Ellen Whitaker (born 5 March 1986) is an English show jumping rider, currently ranked 191 on the FEI riders Longines Ranking list in July 2022.

== Career ==
Competing since the age of 5, Whitaker has had much experience in the equestrian world and qualified for HOYS aged 8 years.

In 2006, Whitaker and her father were involved with a legal dispute over the ownership of thirteen horses, including her top horse Locarna; a few months later a deal was agreed.

In 2007, Whitaker represented Great Britain in the European Championships and helped allow Britain to qualify for the Olympics after jumping triple clear. She missed out on being selected for the 2008 Beijing Olympics due to lameness in horse Locarno 62.

In 2010, Whitaker spoke to the press after refusing to jump for the British team due to a conflict with the team manager, Rob Hoekstra. She told Horse & Hound: "I only have Ocolado at the moment and Rob wanted to interfere with the way I do everything." Her father, and manager, added: "It's not a matter of Ellen not wanting to jump for her country, but we won't jump again until Rob Hoekstra is finished." But British Equestrian Federation World Class performance director Will Connell said: "The riders wanted stronger management and leadership and that's what Rob is delivering." Hoekstra did not wish to comment, saying: "I do not think team issues are best resolved through the press."

== Personal life ==
She is the daughter of former show jumper Stephen Whitaker and his wife Carol, and niece of rider Michael Whitaker. Her brothers, including Donald, and cousins Robert and William, are also show jumpers.

She lives on the family farm near Barnsley, South Yorkshire, and attended Penistone Grammar School.

On 19 September 2011, Whitaker pleaded guilty to driving under the influence. Whitaker was stopped by local Police in Knutsford, Cheshire at 02:00 after she had attended a charity ball. A roadside breath test proved positive and she was taken to a police station where her lowest reading was 77 microgrammes of alcohol in 100 millilitres of breath; more than double the legal limit of 35.

She was engaged to actor Henry Cavill from 2011 until 2012.

Whitaker and Spanish showjumper Antonio Mariñas Soto have two sons together, born May 2014 and March 2016. On 5 August 2016, Whitaker and Soto announced their engagement.

== Horses ==
=== Current ===
- Arena UK Winston (born 2009), ISH, Stallion, sired by: waldo, damsire: Hamilton Tropics Owner: Ellen Whitaker
- Irorko VD Brouwershoeve (born 2008), Belgian Warmblood, Gelding, sire: Canturano, dam: Artemis, Owners: Jose Bono Rodríguez & Club Hipico Fierro
- Luibanta BH (born 2008), ISH, Stallion, sire: Luidam, Dam Sire: Abantos Owner: Gochman Sport Horse LLC
- Virginia (born 2005), Mare, sire: Centauer Z, dam: Bella Madona, Owners: Haudani Consulting S.L
- “Conshira Blue PS” (born 2013), Mare, sire Conthargos, Dam Sire: Chacco-Blue. Owner: Tilly Shaw

=== Former show horses ===
- Magic Mal
- Miami Bound
- Savy Mill
- Lawyer
- Great Love
- Kanselier (born 1992), Dutch Warmblood, gelding, sired by: Notaris, damsire: Nimmerdor
- Locarno 62 (born 1996), Holsteiner horse, Stallion, sire Lord Calidos, damsire: Romino, Owners: Dawn Makin & Steven Whitaker
- Equimax Ocolado (born 1996), Dutch Warmblood, Gelding, sire: Habsburg, damsire: Calvados, Owners: Dawn Makin & Steven Whitaker
- Ladina B (born 1997), Württemberger, Mare
- Royal Rose (born 1998), Dutch Warmblood, Stallion, sire: Calvados, Owner: Steven Whitaker
- Ximena (born 2001), Mare, sire: Irco Mena 763, damsire: Hertigen, Owners: Dawn Makin & Steven Whitaker
- Arena UK Lando (born 2002), Oldenburg horse, Gelding, sire: Landor S, damsire: Lord, Owner: Norman Orly

Spacecake (born 2012), Mare, sire Stakkatol, Dam Sire: Kannan.

== Successes ==
- European Junior Championships:
  - 2003, San Remo: Rank 2 (Team)
- European Championships:
  - 2007, Mannheim: Rank 3 (Team)

Among many others, some of her achievements are:

- Winning the 2010 British Open Show Jumping Championships
- Winning the 2010 Hickstead Speed Derby
- Winning the 2009 HOYS show jumper of the year Grand Prix and show jumper of the show
- Winning the HOYS speed stakes in 2006, 2008 and 2009
- Winning the HOYS 2009 Puissance
- Winning the 2007 Hickstead Speed Derby

== Video game ==
Koch Media launched Ellen Whitaker's Horse Life video game for PC, Nintendo DS and Wii.
