= Chumakov =

Chumakov or Chumakova may refer to:

- Chumakov (village), a village (khutor) in the Republic of Adygea, Russia
- 5465 Chumakov, an asteroid named for Mikhail Chumakov (1909–1993)

== People with the surname ==
- Aleksandr Chumakov (footballer) (1948–2012), Soviet footballer
- Alexander N. Chumakov (born 1950), Russian philosopher, theoretician of science and scientific community organizer
- Aleksandr Chumakov (sailor) (1927–2019), Russian sailor
- Aleksandr Petrovich Chumakov (born 1941), Belarusian Army general and former Minister of Defence of Belarus
- Mikhail Chumakov (1909–1993), Russian virologist
- Natalia Chumakova (born 1969), Russian musician and journalist
- Sergey Chumakov (canoeist) (1928–1994), Soviet sprint canoer
- Sergey Chumakov (singer) (born 1972), Soviet and Russian singer
- Olesya Chumakova (born 1981), Russian middle-distance runner
- Roza Chumakova (1924–2007), Russian rower

== See also ==
- Chumak (disambiguation)
- Chumachenko
