= Chumak (disambiguation) =

Chumak was a merchant / carter of Ukrainian history and folklore

Chumak may also refer to:

- Chumak (surname)
- Chumak (company), a food processor in Kakhovka, Ukraine
- Chumak (dance), a Ukrainian folk dance
- Jumak, another Romanization referring to a type of tavern in old Korean society

== See also ==
- Chumakov (disambiguation)
