= Alexander Chumakov =

Alexander or Aleksandr Chumakov may refer to:

- Aleksandr Chumakov (footballer) (1948–2012), Soviet footballer
- Alexander N. Chumakov (born 1950), Russian philosopher, theoretician of science and scientific community organizer
- Aleksandr Chumakov (sailor) (1927–2019), Russian sailor
- Aleksandr Petrovich Chumakov (born 1941), Belarusian Army general and former Minister of Defence of Belarus
