= Horse Creek =

Horse Creek may refer to:

== Australia ==
- Horse Creek, Queensland, a locality in the Rockhampton Region

== United States ==
=== Locations ===
- Horse Creek, California, an unincorporated community
- Horse Creek, South Dakota, a census-designated place
- Horse Creek, Wisconsin, an unincorporated community
- Horse Creek, Wyoming, an unincorporated community
- Horse Creek Valley, an area along Horse Creek, a tributary of the Savannah River

=== Waterways ===
- Horse Creek (Tombigbee River tributary), a tributary of the Tombigbee River in Alabama
- Horse Creek (California), a tributary of Ulatis Creek in Solano County
- Horse Creek (Colorado), a tributary of the Arkansas River
- Horse Creek (Cedar Creek tributary), a stream in Missouri
- Horse Creek (James River tributary), a stream in Missouri
- Horse Creek (Little River tributary), a stream in Hoke County, North Carolina
- Horse Creek (Drowning Creek tributary), a stream in Moore County, North Carolina
- Horse Creek (McKenzie River tributary), a stream in Oregon
- Horse Creek (Tennessee River tributary), a stream in Tennessee

== See also ==
- Horse Creek Bridge (disambiguation)
- Horse (disambiguation)
- Creek (disambiguation)
