= Equestrian =

Equestrian may refer to:

- related to equestrianism, horse riding
- releted to the equites, a social class of ancient Rome
- Equestrian, a ship used to transport convicts from England to Australia, for example Alfred Dancey

== See also ==
- Horse (disambiguation)
- Horse people (disambiguation)
- Horseman (disambiguation)
- Horsewoman (disambiguation)
- Equestria, a fictional location in the My Little Pony franchise
- Equestria, Pretoria, South Africa
- List of equestrian sports
  - Equestrian events at the Summer Olympics
- Equestrian statue, a statue of a leader on horseback
