= Horse riding (disambiguation) =

Horse riding or horseback riding refers to:

- Equestrianism
  - Equitation (art or practice of horse riding)
- Horse Riding (EP), an EP by The Hiatus

== See also ==
- Equestrian (disambiguation)
