= Sergey Chumakov =

Sergey Chumakov may refer to:

- Sergey Chumakov (canoeist)
- Sergey Chumakov (singer)
