= Horse Range =

Horse Range may refer to:

- Horse Range (California) in Nevada County, California, United States
- Horse Range (Nevada) in Nye County, Nevada, United States
- Horse Range (Oregon) in Josephine County, Oregon, United States
- Horse Range (New Zealand), in North Otago, New Zealand
