= Headless Horseman (disambiguation) =

The Headless Horseman is a fictional character that appears in many venues.

Headless Horseman may also refer to:

- Headless Horseman ("Legend of Sleepy Hollow"), a character in the 1820 short story "The Legend of Sleepy Hollow" by Washington Irving

== Film ==
- The Headless Horseman (1922 film), a horror film starring Will Rogers
- "The Headless Horseman" (1934 film), a film directed by Ub Iwerks and part of the ComiColor cartoon series
- The Headless Horseman (1973 film), a 1973 Soviet Western by Vladimir Vajnshtok
- Headless Horseman (film), a 2007 film that aired on the Sci Fi Channel
- The Headless Horseman, a character in the 1949 animated film The Adventures of Ichabod and Mr. Toad
- The Headless Horseman, a character in the 1999 horror film Sleepy Hollow
- Headless Horseman, a 2022 The Asylum film

== Music ==
- The Headless Horseman, a 2002 album by Pegazus
- "The Headless Horseman", a 1949 song from The Adventures of Ichabod and Mr. Toad
- "The Headless Horseman", a 1986 song by Joe Satriani from Not of This Earth
- "Headless Horseman", a 2003 song by Pigmy Love Circus from The Power of Beef
- "Headless Horseman", a 2001 song by the Microphones from The Glow Pt. 2

== Other uses ==
- The Headless Horseman (novel), an 1865 novel by Mayne Reid
- "The Headless Horseman of Halloween", a 1976 episode of The Scooby-Doo Show
- Headless Horseman Hayrides, a Halloween attraction in Ulster Park, New York
- The Horseless Headless Horsemann, a character in Team Fortress 2

== See also ==
- Horseman (disambiguation)
