= Horseman =

Horseman or The Horsemen may refer to:

== Occupations and activities ==
- a person who practices equestrianism, or horse riding
- Wrangler (profession), someone employed to professionally handle animals
- Stockman (Australia), a person who looks after the livestock on a station

== Arts and entertainment ==
=== Film ===
- The Horsemen, title of a 1950 Soviet film released at home as Brave People
- The Horsemen (1971 film), starring Omar Sharif
- Horseman (film), a 2003 Croatian drama film
- The Horseman (film), a 2008 Australian thriller
- Horsemen (film), a 2009 American thriller

=== Other uses in arts and entertainment ===
- BoJack Horseman (character), the protagonist of the television series BoJack Horseman
- The Horseman (opera), by Aulis Sallinen, 1975

== Businesses and organizations ==
- Mkhedrioni ('Horsemen'), a political group in Georgia
- The Horsemen Aerobatic Team, a P-51 flying group
- Brooklyn Lions / Horsemen (1926), an American football team
- Horseman, a brand of cameras by Komamura Corporation

== People ==
- David Horseman (born 1983), English football coach
- Elaine Horseman (1925–1999), British author
- Marie Horseman (1911–1974), Australian cartoonist
- Tony Horseman (born 1941), English former footballer
- Lot Smith (1830–1892), Mormon pioneer and American frontiersman nicknamed The Horseman

== Places ==
- Horseman, Wisconsin, US

== See also ==
- Centaur, a horse–man beast in classical mythology
- The Fourth Horseman (disambiguation)
- The Fifth Horseman (disambiguation)
- Four Horsemen of the Apocalypse (disambiguation)
- Headless Horseman (disambiguation)
- Horse (disambiguation)
- Horsemaning, a photographic pose
- Horse people (disambiguation)
- Horsewoman (disambiguation)
- Hostler, a groom or stableman
- Royal Canadian Mounted Police
- Teamster, a truck driver, or a person who drives of draft animals
