= Horse of the Year Show =

British equestrian show

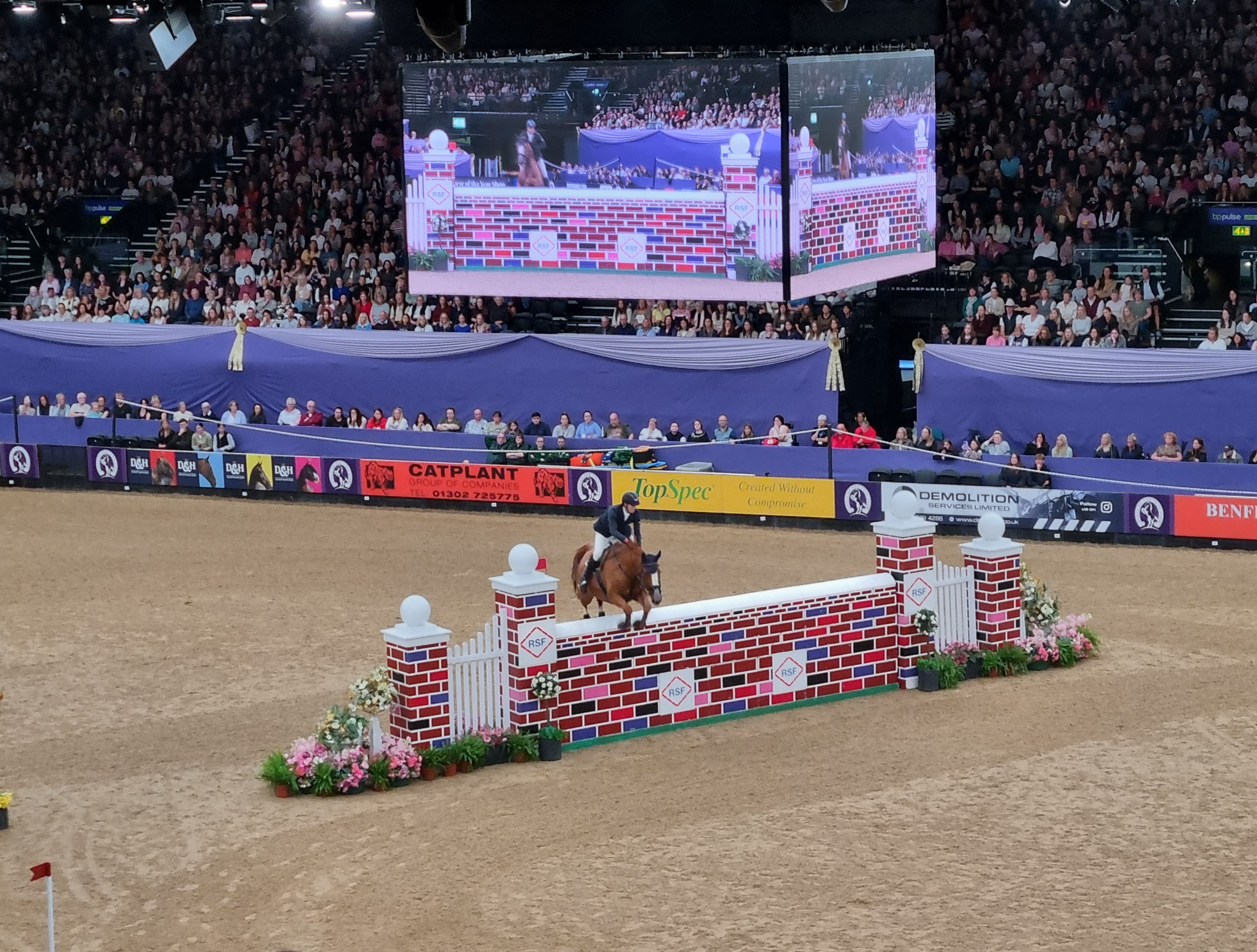
2025 Show in Birmingham, puissance jump

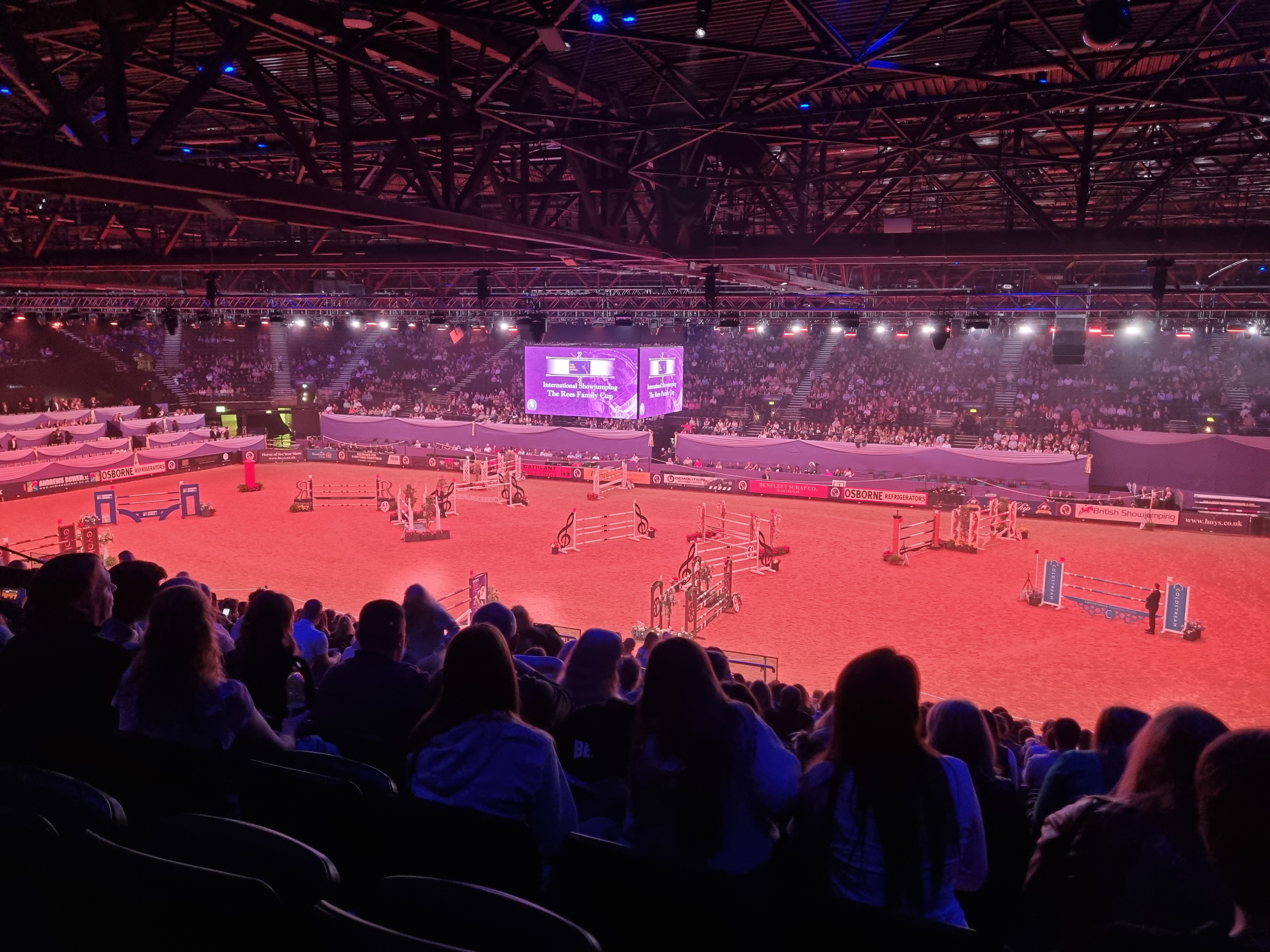
2025 Show in Birmingham, show jumping course

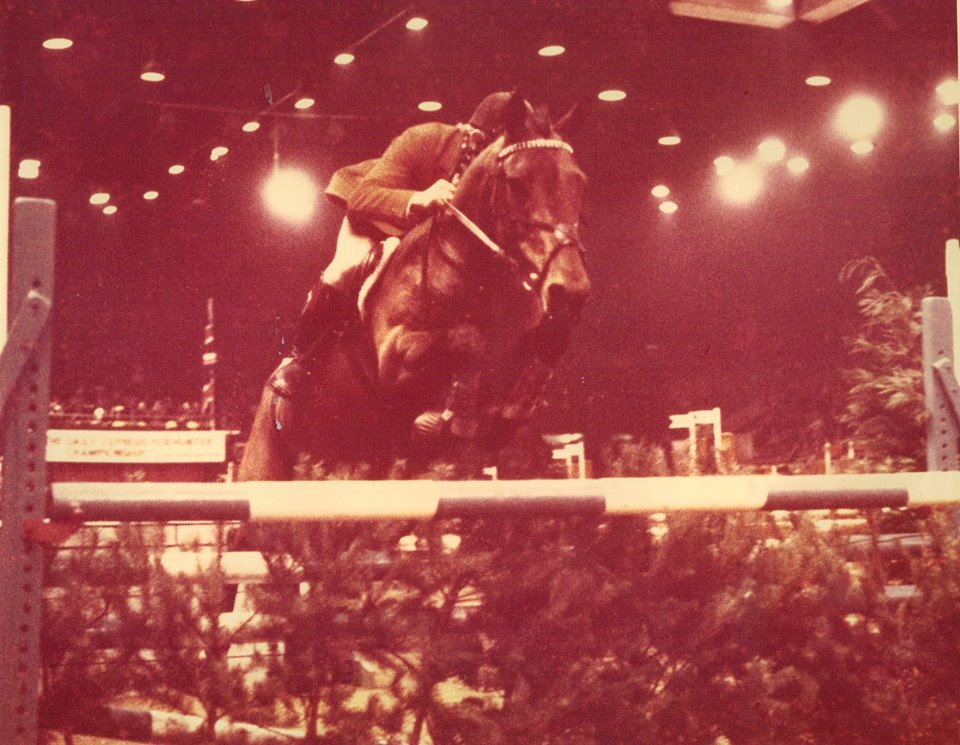
William Sheret winning the 1975 Foxhunter Championship at the Show at Wembley Arena in London

The Horse of the Year Show, also known as HOYS (pronounced /hɔɪz/), was founded to be a culmination of the British equestrian events year. The Show was the idea of Captain Tony Collings and was realised by the then-Chairman of the British Showjumping Association, Mike Ansell. As it was to be the end-of-season finale, the show needed to be held indoors, making it a unique event.

== History ==
HOYS was first held in 1949 at Harringay Arena in Harringay, London. It was held as an annual event, which moved to Wembley Arena, London, ten years later. The show again moved to Solihull's National Exhibition Centre in 2002 due to the impending closure of Wembley Arena for reconstruction, where it is now held every October. The event has become larger and more complex each year in its larger venue, including the introduction in 2003 of an extensive Equestrian Retail Village.

Its purpose was to be a 'champion of champions' Show, and originally took the best from showing and show jumping competitions throughout the year. Nowadays HOYS allocates showing qualifiers to Societies and Shows and the Champions of these qualifiers compete at HOYS to be crowned the Champion of Champions. British Showjumping allocates the National Showjumping qualifiers. Over 120 county and equestrian shows in Great Britain host qualifiers for this huge indoor event.

Due in part to its standards of competition and its placement at the end of equestrian year, the show has become a widely known in the UK and the world.

The show runs every October and incorporates a full programme of international show jumping, the British National Show Jumping finals, Showing Finals and a range of displays and entertainment including the Pony Club Mounted Games for the Prince Philip Cup.

In 1997 the then promoters of HOYS went bankrupt. Grandstand Media Ltd were based at Wembley and with help from the shows existing supporters, officials and sponsors the show went on that year under Grandstand Media Ltd. Following the 1997 show, Grandstand Media obtained a long license from British Showjumping to run the show in its entirety and they have since revitalised the presentation and content including a special celebration in 1998 to commemorate the fiftieth show. Horse of the Year Show remains a National Institution, the finale to the showing year and the climax to the domestic show jumping year.

2002 saw HOYS move from Wembley Arena, its home for over 40 years to the NEC Arena, Birmingham. Logistically this was very complicated as the show takes up over 50 acres (200,000 m^{2}) of the NEC complex, but with record attendance figures and outstanding competition it was described by Horse & Hound as a 'Triumph' and was heralded a resounding success with sell out performances throughout the show. Since the move to the NEC HOYS has developed and expanded experiencing record numbers visit the Show every year.

Each year, the Sunday Gala Night concludes with Ronald Duncan's emotive poem The Horse; this was read by Simon MacCorkindale until 2010. Monty Roberts has described the Horse of the Year Show as the "Best in the world. It is the "World's Most Famous Horse Show".

For many years, the event was televised by the BBC which attracted large audiences but was shown on Sky Sports in the recent years. By 2016, it had moved to Horse & Country TV.

== Showjumping ==
Horse of the Year Show features the finals of the most prestigious National show jumping championships. It also runs a full programme of International classes, four of which carry Longines World Ranking Points. Britain's top show jumpers will take on a host of leading foreign contenders in an array of entertaining speed and jump-off classes. The competitions include the crowd favourite Puissance, featuring the huge red wall that exceeds heights of 7 ft, and the prestigious Leading Show Jumper of the Year.

=== Feature classes ===
The Puissance

The Puissance is probably the most famous show jumping competition in the world; designed to push both horse and rider to their limits.

The Leading Pony Show Jumper of the Year

This is the biggest junior competition at HOYS. The classic jump-off course is always fiercely contested by some of the country's top under 16-year-old riders.

Senior Foxhunter Championship

This is the "FA Cup" of domestic show jumping and features the country's leading novice horses. From first round competitions at venues up and down the country, then second-round direct qualifiers, only 24 finalists qualify to HOYS.

Leading Show Jumper of the Year

This is the climax of HOYS' international show jumping classes. Nine of the international classes throughout the Show carry qualifying points towards this final. The top 28 horse and rider combinations will compete for the chance to battle it out on this challenging course and gain a share in the £40,000 prize fund.

A major climax of HOYS 2016 was the supreme horse title winner Allister Hood with Our Cashel Blue.
