= Horse (Lyube song) =

1994 song by Lyube

Song by Lyube
- Songwriter: Igor Matvienko

Kon' (Horse; Russian: Конь) is a popular Russian song, first performed by the pop band Lyube in 1994. The music was written by Igor Matvienko, and the lyrics by his long-time co-author Alexander Shaganov.

The song is extremely popular, performed by many artists, and has acquired the status of a quasi-"folk" song, performed at family events.

== History ==
According to Matvienko, the song was originally written for another music project that he was producing, Ivanushki International, and only at the last moment the idea came to remake it for Lyube.

... those are Shaganov’s lyrics. But the idea was mine, and Shaganov unfolded it into a brilliant work with such a climax, with pathos. Pure Shaganov-style. Only he can do such a thing. And by the way, it was almost made for the "Ivanushki". There should have been drums, but then for some reason we made a song for the choir out of this. Ah, I've recalled why! Because, may he rest in the Kingdom of Heaven, the late Anatoly Kuleshov worked for us, and he suggested it. (...) He sang in a church ... (...) He was a choirmaster and rehearsed all the choral parts. And we decided to make such a choir, and we got an a-capella piece

— Игорь Игоревич Матвиенко. Интервью // Вечный Зов

The corresponding fragment from the musical film Zona Lyube, which accompanied the album of the same name, functions as the song's music video.

== Popularity ==
In a sociological study conducted in 2015 by the Russki Reporter magazine, the lyrics of Kon' came to the 32nd place in the list of the most popular poetic lines in Russia, ahead of the Anthem of the Soviet Union, which achieved the 39th place in the same rating.

The Russian writer Dmitry Sokolov-Mitrich calls the song "Russia's unofficial anthem", writing:

In just a few years, the "Horse" achieved crazy popularity. Without much effort on the part of the producer, tens and then hundreds of different artists sang it. It paralyzed millions of souls in every corner of the planet, where they speak at least a little Russian. Although, if you think of it, well, what is this sort of thing in this song? Why does it "catch the throat" of a Russian, a Tatar, a Chechen or a Ukrainian?

The regent of the choir of the Sretensky Monastery male monastery Nikon Zhila indicates that this is the most popular song from the choir's repertoire among listeners throughout Russia.

Matvienko calls Kon' the most important song he wrote in his life.

== Music ==
The song begins unaccompanied, a capella, in folk traditions, in which the lead singer begins the chanting. The male choir is joining gradually, as if from a distance. The third verse is an octave higher, intensifying the performance and overwhelming the emotions, and the final phrase, in the best traditions of the genre, leaves room for reflection, and a sort of incompleteness.

== Lyrics ==
The words of the song use archetypal motives of Russian lyrical poetry. For example, the line "there is grace in the night stars" (Ночью в поле звёзд благодать) corresponds to "grace of flying stars" (летающих звёзд благодать) from Sergei Yesenin's poem “Leaves are falling, leaves are falling...”.

Sokolov-Mitrich especially notes the verse saying "let me go out and seek where does the field give birth to the dawn" (Дай-ка я пойду посмотрю, / Где рождает поле зарю): "There it is, the 'national idea'. Unheard of simplicity. Get to the horizon. Going towards the sun forever in the naïve hope of catching it. The mission is stupid and at the same time great. Because it doesn’t matter whether that place exists or not. It is important that for this nation there is an endless task source. Go, ride, race towards the emerging light, to the East. There, where everything starts and nothing dies. Where does the new day come from, a new world, a new life".

| Russian | Russian Transliteration | Russian IPA | English Translation |
|---|---|---|---|
| Выйду ночью в поле с конём Ночкой тёмной тихо пойдём Мы пойдём с конём по полю вдвоём Мы пойдём с конём по полю вдвоём Ночью в поле звёзд благодать В поле никого не видать Только мы с конём по полю идём Только мы с конём по пoлю идём Сяду я верхом на коня Ты неси по полю меня По бескрайнему полю моему По бескрайнему полю моему Дай-ка я разок посмотрю Где рождает поле зарю Ай брусничный цвет, алый да рассвет Али есть то место, али его нет Полюшко моё, родники Дальних деревень огоньки Золотая рожь да кудрявый лён Я влюблён в тебя, Россия, влюблён Будет добрым год хлебород Было всяко, всяко пройдёт Пой, злотая рожь, пой, кудрявый лён Пой о том, как я в Россию влюблён! | Vyjdu, noch'yu v pole s konyom Nochkoj tyomnoj tikho pojdyom My pojdyom s konyom pо́ polyu vdvoyom My pojdyom s konyom pо́ polyu vdvoyom Noch'yu v pole zvyozd blagodat' V pole nikogo ne vidat' Tol'ko my s konyom pо polyu idyom Tol'ko my s konyom pо polyu idyom Syadu ya verkhom na konya Ty nesi po polyu menya Po beskrajnemu polyu moemu Po beskrajnemu polyu moemu Daj-ka ya razok posmotryu Gde rozhdaet pole zaryu Aj brusnishnyj cvet, alyj da rassvet Ali est' to mesto, ali ego net Polyushko moyo, rodniki Dal'nih dereven' ogon'ki Zolotaya rozh' da kudryavyj lyon Ya vlyublyon v tebya, Rossiya, vlyublyon Budet dobrym god khleborod Bylo vsyako, vsyako projdyot Poj, zlotaya rozh', poj, kudryavyj lyon Poj o tom, kak ya v Rossiyu vlyublyon! | ˈvɨjdʊ ˈnot͡ɕjʊ v ˈpolʲe s kɐˈnʲɵm ˈnot͡ɕkəj ˈtʲɵmnəj ˈtʲixə pɐjˈdʲɵm mɨ pɐjˈdʲɵm s kɐˈnʲɵm ˈpo pɐˈlʲu vdvɐˈjɵm mɨ pɐjˈdʲɵm s kɐˈnʲɵm ˈpo pɐˈlʲu vdvɐˈjɵm ˈnot͡ɕjʊ v ˈpolʲe zvʲɵst bɫəɡɐˈdatʲ v ˈpolʲe nʲɪkɐˈvo nʲɪ vʲɪˈdatʲ ˈtolʲkə mɨ s kɐˈnʲɵm ˈpo pɐˈlʲu ɪˈdʲɵm ˈtolʲkə mɨ s kɐˈnʲɵm ˈpo pɐˈlʲu ɪˈdʲɵm ˈsʲadʊ ja vʲɪrˈxom nə kɐˈnʲa tɨ nʲɪˈsʲi pə pɐˈlʲu mʲɪˈnʲa ˈpo bʲɪˈskrajnʲɪj(j)ɪˈmu pɐˈlʲu mə(j)ɪˈmu ˈpo bʲɪˈskrajnʲɪj(j)ɪˈmu pɐˈlʲu mə(j)ɪˈmu daj ka ja rɐˈzok pəsmɐˈtrʲu ɡdʲe rɐʐˈda(j)ɪt ˈpolʲe zɐˈrʲu aj brʊsʲˈnʲit͡ʂnɨj svʲet ˈaɫɨj da rɐs(ː)ˈvʲet ɐˈlʲi jesʲtʲ to ˈmʲestə ɐˈlʲi (j)ɪˈvo nʲet ˈpolʲʊʂkə mɐˈjɵ, rədʲnʲɪˈkʲi ˈdalʲnʲɪx dʲɪrʲɪˈvʲenʲ ɐɡɐnʲˈkʲi zəɫɐˈtajə roʂ d̪ɐ kʊˈdrʲavɨj lʲɵn ja vlʲʊˈblʲɵn v tʲɪˈbʲa, rɐˈsʲijə, vlʲʊˈblʲɵn ˈbudʲɪt ˈdobrɨjm ɡot xlʲɪbɐrˈot bˈɨlə fsʲˈækə, fsʲˈækə prɐjˈdʲɵt poj zɫɐˈtajə roʂ, poj, kʊˈdrʲavɨj lʲɵn poj, o tom kak ja v rɐˈsʲijʊ vlʲʊˈblʲɵn | I will ride out at night into a field on a horse, through the dark night, quietly we will go. We (I) will go with a horse through a field together, We will go with a horse through a field together. In the night in the field stars are graceful (or plentiful), In the field no one is being seen. Only we (me) with a horse through a field go, Only we with a horse through a field go, I will sit on the top of a horse, You carry me across the field. Over the endless field of mine, Over the endless field of mine. Let me see just once, Where the field gives birth to the dawn. Oh lingonberry color, scarlet, yes, the dawn, Either there is such a place, or there is not. My dear field, dear springs, Lights of faraway villages. Golden rye and curly flax, I'm in love with you, Russia, in love. This year will be good, a fruitful harvest, Somehow it was, and it always pass at the end. Sing, golden rye, sing, curly flax, Sing of how I am in love with Russia! |
