= Four Horsemen of the Apocalypse (disambiguation) =

The Four Horsemen of the Apocalypse are figures in the Book of Revelation in the New Testament of the Bible.

Four Horsemen of the Apocalypse or Four Horsemen may also refer to:

== Arts and entertainment ==
=== Fictional characters ===
- Horsemen of Apocalypse, in Marvel's X-Men universe
- The Four Horsemen of the Apocalypse, in the East of West comic series
- The Four Horsemen of the Apocalypse, in Supernatural season 5
- The Four Horsemen, in the film Now You See Me and its sequel
- Four Horsemen, in Chainsaw Man
- Four Horsemen, in the Highlander franchise

=== Film and television ===
- The Four Horsemen of the Apocalypse (1921 film), based on the Blasco Ibáñez novel
- The Four Horsemen of the Apocalypse (1962 film), loosely based on the novel
- Four of the Apocalypse, a 1975 spaghetti western
- Four Horsemen (film), a 2012 British documentary film

=== Literature ===
- The Four Horsemen of the Apocalypse (novel), by Vicente Blasco Ibáñez, 1916
- Four Horsemen (poetry), a Toronto sound-poetry group 1970–1988

=== Music ===
==== Bands ====
- The Four Horsemen (band), an American hard-rock band 1989–1996
- The Hrsmn, or the Four Horsemen, an American hip hop supergroup

==== Albums ====
- The 4 Horsemen of the Apocalypse, a 1985 album by the Bollock Brothers
- The Four Horsemen (album), by Ultramagnetic MCs, 1993

==== Songs ====
- "The Four Horsemen" (song), a song by Aphrodite's Child from the 1972 album 666
- "Four Horsemen", a song by The Clash from the 1979 album London Calling
- "The Four Horsemen", a 1983 reworking of the Metallica song "Mechanix"
- "The Four Horsemen", a song by Judas Priest from the 2008 album Nostradamus
- "The Four Horsemen", a song by Rotting Christ from the 2016 album Rituals
- "The Four Horseman", a song by Nebula album from the 2022 album Transmission from Mothership Earth

=== Visual arts ===
- The Four Horsemen of the Apocalypse, a woodcut by Albrecht Dürer in his 1498 series Apocalypse
- Four Horsemen of the Apocalypse (painting), by Viktor Vasnetsov, 1887

=== Other uses in arts and entertainment ===
- Four Horsemen Studios, collectible figure design studio and manufacturer
- The Four Horsemen of the Apocalypse (video game), unreleased

== People ==
- Four Horsemen of the Apocalypse (blackjack), the people who discovered the best playing strategy for blackjack
- Four Horsemen (American football), a 1924 group of players at Notre Dame under coach Knute Rockne
- Four Horsemen (Supreme Court), the United States conservative justices during the New Deal era
- The Four Horsemen (professional wrestling), professional wrestling stable
- The Four Horsemen, key figures associated with New Atheism
- The Four Horsemen, a bridge team founded in 1931 by P. Hal Sims

== Other uses ==
- The Four Horsemen (restaurant), in Brooklyn, New York, US

== See also ==
- Horseman (disambiguation)
- The Fourth Horseman (disambiguation)
- The Fifth Horseman (disambiguation)
- Four Knights of the Apocalypse, Japanese manga series
- Four Horsemen of the Infocalypse, term for internet criminals, or the imagery of internet criminals
