= The Fifth Horseman =

The Fifth Horseman may refer to:

- The Fifth Horseman, a 1924 film starring Una Merkel
- The Fifth Horseman, a 1974 novel by José Antonio Villarreal
- The Fifth Horseman, a 1976 novel by Walter Harris
- The Fifth Horseman, a 1980 novel by Larry Collins and Dominique Lapierre
- "The Fifth Horseman", a 1996–97 X-Men episode
- The 5th Horseman, a 2006 novel by James Patterson and Maxine Paetro
- The Fifth Horseman and the New MAD, a 2022 book by Harlan K. Ullman
- In the context of the Four Horsemen of New Atheism, Ayaan Hirsi Ali was referred to as the Fifth Horseman or One Horse-Woman

== See also ==
- The Third Horseman (TV episode), 2002 season 1 episode 11 of Law & Order: Criminal Intent
- The Fourth Horseman (disambiguation)
- Four Horsemen (disambiguation)
- Horseman (disambiguation)
