= Horsewoman (disambiguation) =

Horsewoman or horse-women may refer to:

== In general ==
- A female horse rider
- A female horse herder
- A female horse farmer
- A female horse breeder
- A female equestrian
- A female horseman

== Other uses ==
- The Horsewoman, a 2021 novel by Karen Bergstralh set in the Assiti Shards shared universe created by Eric Flint
- Horsewoman (Frentz), a 1925 painting by Rudolf Frentz
- Horsewoman (Bryullov), a 1832 painting by Karl Bryullov

== See also ==
- Mare, a female horse
- Centaur, a half-human half-horse creature
- Women (disambiguation)
- Woman (disambiguation)
- Horse (disambiguation)
- Horseman (disambiguation)
- Horse people (disambiguation)
