= The Horse (poem) =

The Horse, sometimes known as An Ode to the Horse, is a poem written by the British writer Ronald Duncan in 1954 at the request of his friend Michael Ansell, to be read at the Horse of the Year Show that Ansell founded. It has been described as his most popular poem. Duncan, who was a keen horseman, and his wife Rose Marie, bred Arabian horses on their Devonshire property. The poem is still read each year at the end of the gala evening on the Sunday night. It has been read at the event by different actors over the years including Simon MacCorkingdale and Brian Blessed.

== Legacy ==
The poem has inspired various people such as Lucinda Green, British world champion eventer and Olympic medal winner, who when writing in Country Life describes the bond that is formed between man and horse as being founded on Duncan's observations expressed in the poem.

The English journalist and horseman Alistair Stewart who, when writing in the Daily Mail about the death of a family pony said, "Ronald Duncan’s poem, The Horse, captures it perfectly: ‘Nobility without pride, friendship without envy, beauty without vanity.’" The poem has been reproduced in a number of specialist equine publications. Allan Hamilton, the American physician and author of a number of books dealing with the relationship between man and the horse, prefaced one of the chapters of his book Zen Mind, Zen Horse: The Science and Spirituality of Working with Horses with the poem.

To the rhetorical question posed in the poem:

Where in this wide world can man find nobility without pride,
friendship without envy, or beauty without vanity?

— Lines 1-2

John Strawson, the British soldier and author wrote in his memoires entitled Hussars, Horses and History, "Those fortunate to have owned, ridden and loved horses will be in no doubt when we emphatically endorse the answer to Ronald Duncan's question."

Lines from the poem were included in the baton used for the UK fund-raising relay, Horses for Health.
