= Horse (disambiguation) =

A horse is a hoofed mammal of the species Equus ferus caballus.

Horse or Horses may also refer to:

== Animals ==
- Equidae, the horse family
  - Equinae, the horse subfamily
    - Equus (genus), the horse genus, including donkeys, horses, zebras, and others
      - Equus ferus, or wild horse, the species from which horses were domesticated

== Arts and entertainment ==
=== Films ===
- Horse (1965 film), an underground film directed by Andy Warhol
- Horse (1941 film), a Japanese film directed by Kajiro Yamamoto (and finished by assistant director Akira Kurosawa)
- Horses (film) (Italian: Cavalli), a 2014 Italian drama film

=== Sports ===
- H-O-R-S-E, a variation of basketball
- Pommel horse, a gymnastics apparatus
- Vaulting horse, a gymnastics apparatus

=== Games ===
- HORSE (poker), a form of poker
- Knight (chess), sometimes called a horse by beginners
- Horses (video game), a 2025 adventure video game

=== Music ===
==== Artists ====
- An Horse, an Australian rock duo
- Horse McDonald, a Scottish singer-songwriter
- Band of Horses, an American rock band known briefly as Horses
- Horse the Band, an American metalcore group
- Horse, American rapper, member of Bravehearts

==== Albums ====
- Horse (album), by Prof.
- Horses (album), by American Patti Smith

==== Songs ====
- "Horse" (Salvatore Ganacci song), 2019
- "Horse" (Lyube song), 1994
- "The Horse", by Cliff Nobles and Company, 1968
- "The Horses", by Rickie Lee Jones, 1989; covered by Daryl Braithwaite, 1990
- "Horse", by Live from Throwing Copper, 1994
- "Horses", by Dala from Everyone Is Someone, 2009
- "Horses", by Maggie Rogers from Surrender, 2022
- "Horses", by PnB Rock, Kodak Black, and A Boogie wit da Hoodie from The Fate of the Furious: The Album, 2017
- "Beauty Queen/Horses", by Tori Amos from Boys for Pele, 1996

==== Books ====
- The Horse, by William Youatt
- Horse (novel), by Geraldine Brooks, 2022

=== Fictional characters ===
- Horse, the main character of Centaurworld
- Horse, a main character of Footrot Flats
- Horse, from the Dudley Do-Right cartoons

=== Other arts and entertainment ===
- "Horses", an episode of the television series Zoboomafoo
- The Horse (poem), a 1954 poem by Ronald Duncan
- The Horse: Backstreet Choppers, an American motorcycling magazine founded by former employees of Iron Horse
- "Horse!", an episode of the TV series Pocoyo

== Geography ==
- Horse Peninsula, a peninsula in South Australia
- Horse Creek (disambiguation)
- Horse Island (disambiguation)
- Horse Range (disambiguation)

== People ==
- Beverly Horse (1931–2010), Native American educator and activist
- Harry Horse, pen name of Richard Horne (1960-2007), British author, illustrator and political cartoonist
- John Horse (c. 1812–1882), African-American adviser to Osceola and a military leader fighting against the United States during the Seminole Wars
- Michael Horse (born 1951), American actor
- Alan Ameche (1933–1988), American football player and entrepreneur nicknamed "the Horse"
- Matt Cain (born 1984), nicknamed "The Horse", American baseball pitcher
- Harry Danning (1911–2004), nicknamed "Harry the Horse", American baseball player
- Harry B. Liversedge (1894–1951), nicknamed "Harry the Horse", United States Marine Corps brigadier general and athlete
- Horse McDonald, Scottish singer-songwriter Sheena Mary McDonald (born 1958)

== Other uses ==
- Horse (geology), a block of rock completely separated from the surrounding rock
- Horse (zodiac), one of the 12 animals in the Chinese zodiac
- Horse meat, the meat from a horse
- Yakovlev Yak-24 (NATO reporting name: Horse), a Soviet transport helicopter
- Horse, a nickname for the drug heroin
- Horse, a nautical term for a fixture which provides a movable attachment for a rope
- Horse, in the board game shogi, a promoted bishop or "dragon horse"
- Horse project, a joint venture by car companies Geely and Renault
- Shorthand for wooden horse, a torture instrument

== See also ==
- Horse people (disambiguation)
- Horsez, a 2006 strategy video game
