= The Fourth Horseman =

The Fourth Horseman may refer to:

- The Four Horsemen of the Apocalypse, the concept in the Christian Bible

== Television ==
- "The Fourth Horseman", episode of Survivors
- "The Fourth Horseman" (Millennium), 1998
- "The Fourth Horseman" (Stargate SG-1), two-part episode (2005–06 )

== Literature ==
- The Fourth Horseman, novel by Geoffrey Bocca (1980)
- The Fourth Horseman, novel by Alan E. Nourse (1983)
- The Fourth Horseman, children's novel by Kate Thompson (2006)
- "The Fourth Horseman", short story by Yoon Ha Lee (2009)
- The Fourth Horseman (comics), comic book published by Fangoria Comics
- Fourth Horseman of Miami Beach, novel by Albert Halper (1960)

== Other uses ==
- The Fourth Horseman (film), a 1932 American Western film
- "The Fourth Horseman", web episode of Afterworld

== See also ==
- Horseman (disambiguation)
- Four Horsemen of the Apocalypse (disambiguation)
- The Third Horseman (TV episode), 2002 episode of Law & Order: Criminal Intent
- The Fifth Horseman (disambiguation)
