= Ronald Duncan =

British writer, poet and playwright (1914–1982)

Personal details
- Born: Ronald Frederick Henry Dunkelsbühler; 6 August 1914 Salisbury, Mashonaland, Rhodesia
- Died: 3 June 1982 (aged 67) Bideford Hospital, Barnstaple, Devon, England
- Spouse: Rose Marie Hansom (m. 1941)
- Children: Briony Duncan (b.1941); Roger Duncan (b.1943)
- Parent(s): Reginald John Dünkelsbuhler; Ethel Cannon
- Education: Downing College, Cambridge
- Occupation: Writer, poet, playwright and librettist
- Known for: The Rape of Lucretia (libretto); The Horse (poem)

Ronald Frederick Henry Duncan (6 August 1914 – 3 June 1982) was an English writer, poet and playwright of German descent, now best known for his poem The Horse and for preparing the libretto for Benjamin Britten's opera The Rape of Lucretia, first performed in 1946.

== Early life ==
Duncan was born Ronald Frederick Henry Dunkelsbühler, in Salisbury, Southern Rhodesia (now Harare, Zimbabwe), in 1914. Duncan's mother, Ethel Cannon, moved the family to London after the outbreak of World War One, though his father, Reginald Dunkelsbühler, remained behind and owing to his German origins was interned as an alien and died of influenza contracted whilst giving medical aid during an epidemic in 1918 before he could rejoin the family.

Duncan attended Downing College, Cambridge, in 1933, reading English under F. R. Leavis. He became a pacifist during the 1930s, publishing The Complete Pacifist in 1936. This was later re-issued in 1937 carrying endorsements from Canon Dick Sheppard of the Peace Pledge Union (PPU), Gerald Heard, and Sylvia Townsend Warner. Later that year he wrote the words for a Pacifist March composed by Benjamin Britten (also a pacifist) for the PPU, but the work was not a success and was soon withdrawn. In the same year he was invited by Gandhi to visit him in India after reading an essay Duncan had sent him that he had written on the subject of passive resistance, and from 1938 was on friendly terms with the British Hispanist Gerald Brenan. His pacifism led him to set up a co-operative farming enterprise at Gooseham and Mead Farm, near Welcombe, Devon, during the Second World War, but it failed by 1943, and in 1944 Duncan successfully faced a conscientious objection tribunal.

== Literary works ==
In 1937 Duncan met Ezra Pound, who encouraged him to found the "little magazine" Townsman, 1938-1945. Of the 24 issues, numbers 21-24 (1944–45) appeared as The Scythe, a title that signalled Duncan's increasing interest in agriculture and husbandry. Duncan was also a writer of short stories and a journalist. He wrote the film script for Girl on a Motorcycle (dir. Jack Cardiff, 1968), which starred Marianne Faithfull. His poetry was published at Faber and Faber by T. S. Eliot, who became a friend.

In 1950, Faber and Faber published Duncan's, The Mongrel and Other Poems. In this volume are included his verse interpolations into his adaptation of Jean Cocteau's The Eagle Has Two Heads.

In 1960 he published The Solitudes a collection of poems that he dedicated to his favourite horse, Dil Fareb.

In 1964 Duncan published All Men are Islands, the first of a series of lively and sometimes contentious and contradictory autobiographies. How to Make Enemies followed in 1968, and Obsessed in 1977. A final controversial autobiography, Working with Britten: A Personal Memoir appeared from Duncan's own Rebel Press in 1981 after being rejected by a mainstream publisher.

In the late 1960s and early 1970s he worked on a long poem about science, Man, in five parts (1970–74), and in 1978 he co-edited a collection of essays by leading scientists The Encyclopedia of Ignorance with Miranda Weston-Smith, grand-daughter of the cosmologist E.A. Milne.

== Dramatic works ==
In 1942-43 he helped Britten with the last scene of the opera Peter Grimes, and wrote the whole of the libretto for The Rape of Lucretia in 1945-46.

Duncan's play This Way to the Tomb was performed at the Mercury Theatre, Notting Hill Gate in 1945, and was followed by his adaptation of Cocteau's L’aigle à deux têtes as The Eagle has Two Heads (1946). Tallulah Bankhead and Marlon Brando appeared in the U.S. production. Stratton was published in 1950. Our Lady's Tumbler was performed in Salisbury Cathedral for the Festival of Britain in on 5 June 1951, in front of the 7th Earl and Countess of Harewood. In the early 1950s he translated and adapted a number of French plays including The Apollo of Bellac by Jean Giraudoux and Jean Cocteau's The Typewriter. Don Juan was first performed in 1953, and The Death of Satan: a comedy in 1954. A joint production of the two latter plays was presented by the English Stage Company at the Royal Court Theatre in 1956, directed by George Devine. In 1962 there was controversy over the refusal of the Lord Chamberlain to permit public performance of The Catalyst, a play about a ménage à trois. These verse plays in the manner of T. S. Eliot became less popular from the mid-1960s.

Ronald Duncan was instrumental in setting up and naming the English Stage Company at London's Royal Court Theatre, which opened in 1956. Regrettably, during its 50th anniversary celebrations in 2006, the theatre did not acknowledge his initial work. Yet theatre historian Irving Wardle wrote, "without Duncan there would have been no English Stage Company".

== Jan at Blue Fox ==
Jan at Blue Fox was a light entertainment show created by the BBC in 1952. The show was derived from the "Jan's Journal" columns written by Duncan for the Evening Standard. The columns were loosely based on Duncan's life as a farmer in North Devon. They were adapted for television by Duncan and George F. Kerr, and starred Philip Ray as 'Jan'.

The episodes were:

1: The Day the Tramp Came

2: Fruit and Flower Show Day

3: A Day of Visitors

4: The Day of the Wreck

No footage remains of this programme, as all of the episodes were aired live and never recorded for posterity. The only existing visual record today of the show consists of still photographs.

Duncan's "Jan's Journal" columns were published in three compilations volumes: "Jan's Journal", "The Blue Fox" and "Jan at the Blue Fox", described by the New Cambridge Bibliography of English Literature as one of a series of “articles and stories on country themes rptd [reported] from the Evening Standard.”

== Selected bibliography ==
- The Blue Fox (1951)
- Jan at the Blue Fox (1952)
- Jan's Journal (1954)

== Personal life ==
Duncan in one of his autobiographies claimed that his father was the illegitimate son of the last Crown Prince of Bavaria, Rupprecht and Julia Wertheimer. Duncan and his partner Rose Marie Hansom moved to Devon in 1939 and married in 1941. Hansom was an artist who illustrated a number of his works. She was a member of a family of successful architects and engineers including Joseph Hansom the inventor of the eponymous horse-drawn cab. They had a daughter Briony who went on to become a successful sculptrice and a son, Roger who became a lawyer. Duncan died in Bideford hospital, Barnstaple, Devon, England, on 3 June 1982.

Duncan was a keen horseman and breeder of Arabian Horses on his farm in Devon. Duncan was co-promotor along with his friend Michael Ansell of one the UK's oldest long distance equestrian competitions, the Golden Horseshoe, created by the British Horse Society in 1965. The first edition covered 50 miles across Exmoor from Malsmead and finished at Duncan's farm in Welcombe.
