= Horse people =

Horse people may refer to

- Equestrians ("people" uncountable)
- Ethnographically, ("people" countable; mostly dated, also mounted people)
  - Eurasian nomads
  - Plains Indians
  - Borana Oromo people
  - Songhai people

== See also ==
- Equestrian (disambiguation)
- Horsewoman (disambiguation)
- Horseman (disambiguation)
- Horse (disambiguation)
