= Horse Creek Bridge =

Horse Creek Bridge may refer to:

- Horse Creek Bridge (Afton, Oklahoma), listed on the National Register of Historic Places in Ottawa County, Oklahoma
- Horse Creek Bridge (McKenzie Bridge, Oregon), formerly listed on the National Register of Historic Places in Lane County, Oregon
- Stonelake Bridge, also known as "Horse Creek Bridge", listed on the national Register of Historic Places in Butte County, South Dakota

== See also ==
- Horse Creek (disambiguation)
