= Chumachenko =

Chumachenko or Chumachenco (Ukrainian, Russian: Чумаче́нко) is a surname of Ukrainian origins. It may refer to:

- Alisa Chumachenko, Lithuanian entrepreneur
- Ihor Chumachenko (born 1976), Ukrainian and Belarusian footballer
- Kateryna Yushchenko (born Catherine Claire Chumachenko in 1961), second wife of former Ukrainian president Viktor Yushchenko
- Mikhail Chumachenko, Ukrainian separatist
- Nicolas Chumachenco (1944–2020), Polish-born violinist
- Pavel Chumachenko (born 1971), Russian shot putter
- Sergei Chumachenko (born 1973), Russian footballer
- Yevgeni Chumachenko (born 1975), Russian footballer
- Yuliya Chumachenko (born 1995), Ukrainian track and field athlete
