= Alexander N. Chumakov =

Russian philosopher (born 1950)

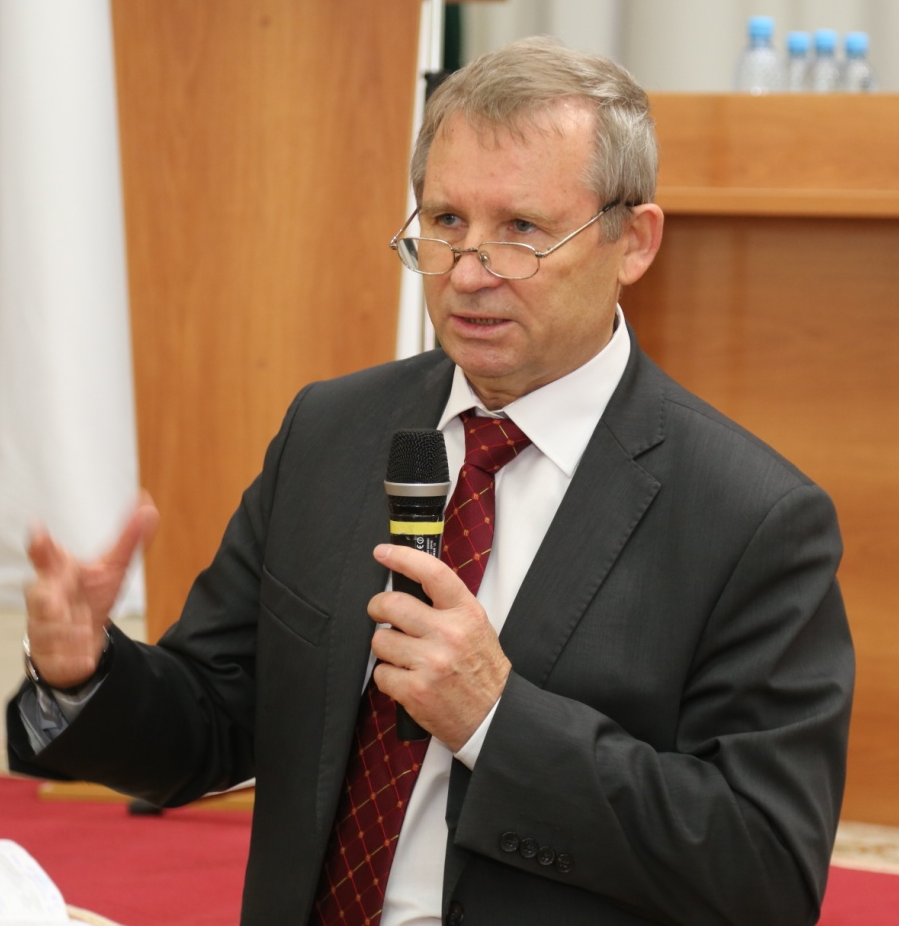
- Born: October 1, 1950 (age 75); Severnoe village, Caspian District, Astrakhan region, USSR (now Lagansky District, Kalmykia, Russia)

Education
- Education: Doctor of Philosophical Sciences (1991); Professor 1993)
- Alma mater: Lomonosov Moscow State University (1981)

Philosophical work
- Era: 20th-21st centuries philosophy
- Region: Russian philosophy
- Institutions: Finance University under the Government of the Russian Federation, Institute of Philosophy of the Russian Academy of Sciences, Lomonosov Moscow State University
- Main interests: Social philosophy, philosophy of culture, global Studies

Alexander N. Chumakov (Алекса́ндр Никола́евич Чумако́в; born on October 1, 1950) is a Russian philosopher, theoretician of science, scientific community organizer, and specialist in the fields of philosophy and the theory of globalistics.

== Biography ==
Alexander N. Chumakov was born in 1950 to a fisherman's family of Severnoe village, Caspian District, Astrakhan region, USSR. In 1972, he graduated from an industrial, technical college in the city of Khadyzhensk in Krasnodar Krai. Between 1972 and 1975, he worked as a bore-hole drilling master in the nuclear testing areas in Semipalatinsk and Novaya Zemlya. In 1975, he was accepted into the preparatory division of the Department of Philosophy of Moscow State University (MSU), from which he graduated cum laude in 1981. He also completed his postgraduate studies at MSU, receiving his Candidate of Sciences in 1984 and his Doctor of Sciences in 1991. Chumakov's doctoral dissertation was on the topic of "Social and Philosophical Aspects of Global Problems." From 1987 to 2019, Chumakov has been a senior researcher, then the leading research fellow and head of the group "Global Studies" at the Institute of Philosophy of the Russian Academy of Sciences (1995-2017, part-time). He became a full professor in 1993. From 2009 to 2017, he worked as a chair of the Department of Philosophy, and a head of the scientific school "Philosophy of Globalization" at the Finance University under the Government of the Russian Federation. From 2008, he is a professor of the Faculty of Global Processes at MSU (2008-2019 concurrently), where he lectures on social philosophy, philosophy and history of science; as well as several specialized author's courses: "Theory of global studies", "Actual problems of global studies", "Russia in the global world", etc.

== Scientific achievements ==
Alexander Chumakov is the leading Russian spokesman for Global studies, which he writes "represents a secular stream of thought that aims to formulate a worldview transcending the division between Russia and the West by providing a new philosophical basis for their integration and ultimate unity. A book review of his book, Philosophy of Globalization, writes that Chumakov "devoted his career in philosophy to the study of globalization and authored more than 830 scientific works and seven scholarly books that have been published in Russian, English, German, French, Chinese, Polish and Czech.

In his writings, Chumakov "formulated the fundamental principles, which constitute the philosophical foundation of globalistics as a special field of philosophical knowledge. His analysis of globalization reveals that it "represents an objective historical process and does not depend on the positive (or negative) intentions of separate countries or nations. It centers on the conceptual triad of culture, civilization, and globalization, which in Chumakov's works "are analyzed as fundamental characteristics of various cultural civilizational systems, characteristics that are closely connected with each other. Chumakov argues that real and productive dialogue among different nations is possible because the universal character of civilization serves as the unifying factor for humanity, "while cultural diversity is the basis of differentiation of various countries and nations.

A.N. Chumakov is the author of the general theory of globalization, which is devoted to three fundamental closely interrelated monographs (trilogy).

The first book “Globalization. Outline of the Holistic World ” is a fundamental fragment of the general theory of globalization developed by the author, in which he recreates a holistic (integral) picture of the world and considers globalization, on the one hand, as a natural-historical process, and on the other, as a sphere of mutual relations and confrontation of various forces and interests. History appears as a single, unfolding process in time, passing through certain stages, the change of which is marked by the main turning points of social development, as a result of which epochal metamorphoses take place. Ultimately, the logic of the development of objective events gives rise to globalization, covering the entire Earth at the level of its three main spheres: geological, biological and social, which are given a unified name - the triosphere. It is shown how the origin and formation of globalistics as an interdisciplinary field of scientific knowledge, formed at the intersection of philosophy, natural, technical and humanitarian sciences, took place.

In the second book “Metaphysics of Globalization. Cultural-cum-civilizational Context”, the focus is on culture, civilization and globalization, which are analyzed as closely interrelated, fundamental characteristics of various cultural and civilizational systems. It is substantiated that, due to objective reasons, global problems covered all spheres of social life of various peoples, and their cultural and civilizational development was drawn into the orbit of accelerating multidimensional globalization. The logic and a certain sequence of historical events are shown, when, as a result of the progressive development and improvement of culture, civilizational ties arose and began to develop, which gave rise to separate centers of civilization. Ultimately, civilizational development led to globalization, which, in turn, led to the emergence in the second half of the XX century. global problems of our time. Using a systematic approach to understanding social processes and relying on the latest scientific and philosophical achievements in this area, the author comes to the conclusion that the linear-plane world has given way to a three-dimensional, holographic world.

The third book "Global World: Clash of Interests" is the final part of the trilogy. Based on previous studies of the nature and direction of global processes, the author shows the multifaceted structure and dynamics of the development of the modern world, analyzes international relations in the context of universal interdependence. Particular attention is paid to the contradictory nature of both the person himself and social relations, which underlies the clash of various interests and incessant social conflicts. Possible scenarios of historical development are considered and the most optimal ways to solve urgent socio-economic and political problems both for individual countries and for the world community as a whole are proposed. This book, in a revised form under the title "An Unmanaged World: A Philosophical Study of Global Dynamics" | Brill, was published in English in 2026 by BRILL.

== Scientific organizing activity ==
Chumakov has devoted a great deal of time to administrative and organizational activities in the fields of philosophy, culture, and education. He was the General Secretary of the Philosophical Society of the USSR (1987-1991); First Vice-President of the Russian Philosophical Society (from 1991 to 2019). He has also been a member of the Executive Committee of the International Association of Professors of Philosophy since 2012, as well as an acting member of the Presidium and Chairman of the Global Studies Section of Russian Ecological Academy since 2013.

In 2003, Chumakov organized a philosophical action that had great cultural significance in Russia and was widely publicized by the Russian media. During the 1920s the Soviet government expelled hundreds of prominent Russian intellectuals from the newly created Soviet Union, including many philosophers. Most of them were transported by boat to Germany and Turkey. In Russian historiography, this event is known as the "philosophers' ships." Eighty years following the event, Chumakov organized a symbolic return of the "philosophers' ships" back to the motherland, which became open to freedom of expression and independent investigation of truth. To this end, he rented a ship, the Maria Ermolova, which sailed on route from Novorossiysk to Istanbul and back to Novorossiysk with hundreds of Russian philosophers on board to take part in the XXI World Congress of Philosophy in Istanbul in 2003.

In 2008, after the XXII World Philosophical Congress in Seoul, Chumakov organized the return of the Russian delegation with the participation of prominent foreign philosophers (85 people) from South Korea to Vladivostok by boat, and then by "Philosophical train" from Vladivostok to Moscow (with stops and scientific conferences in the largest Russian cities: Khabarovsk, Chita, Ulan-Ude, Irkutsk (with a trip to the lake. Baikal), Krasnoyarsk, Novosibirsk, Yekaterinburg, Kazan). (see: Bulletin of the Russian Philosophical Society, 2008, No. 3, 4;)

Chumakov participated in the last seven World Congresses of Philosophy, in Brighton in 1988, in Moscow in 1993, in Boston in 1998, in Istanbul in 2003, in Seoul in 2008, and in Athens in 2013, and in Beijing in 2018. Throughout the events, he delivered scholarly presentations, including plenary addresses, and also served as chair of various roundtables, panels, and sections. At the XXV World Congress of Philosophy (Rome, 2024), he organized the round table "Philosophy. Globalization. Education and Peace". Chumakov was also one of the initiators and main organizers of the Russian philosophical congresses that have taken place every three years, starting in 1997 and up to the latest in 2015, which took place in Ufa.

In 2003, he created a website, dedicated to global studies and global processes. Since 2020, the site has been working under his scientific supervision and under the auspices of the Faculty of Global Processes of the Lomonosov Moscow State University. He also founded and is the head of the permanent (since 2001) monthly interdisciplinary theoretical seminar "Topical Problems of Global Studies".

Chumakov, co-founder (with L. E. Grinin) and editor-in-chief of the journal "Age of Globalization"; initiator of the publication and editor-in-chief of the journal "Bulletin of the Russian Philosophical Society" (1997-2018); Member of the editorial boards of many Russian and foreign journals.

He is a visiting Professor of the Beijing Normal University (Beijing, China, 2007–2010); visiting Professor at Link Campus University (Rome, Italy, 2019–2021); Guest researcher of China Nacional Center for Culture Studies of the Chinese Academy of Social Sciences (Beijing, China, 2019-2020); A visiting researcher of the Institute of State Governance of Huazhong Yniversity of Science and Technology (2023).

== Honors and awards ==
Chumakov was named laureate in the 2003 Russian publishers' "Book of the Year" contest in the nomination category of "Encyclopedist". He was awarded for the publication of his international encyclopedia, Global Studies, which had been published in Russian and English languages.

In 2004, he was also named laureate of the international award named after N. K. Ba'bakov, bestowed by the International Fuel and Power Association (IFPA) "for great accomplishments in resolving the problems of stable development of the power engineering and society."

In 2006, Chumakov received a diploma for co-authoring the fourth edition of the textbook "Philosophy", one of the "300 best textbooks for higher education in honor of the 300th anniversary of Saint-Petersburg."

In 2015, Chumakov became Doctor Emeritus of the Bashkir State University and Honored Professor of the Financial University under the Government of the Russian Federation (2016).

In 2015 Chumakov also became a recipient of the International Gusi Peace Prize.

== Main publications ==
=== Books ===
==== Monographs ====
===== Russian =====
- Chumakov, A. N. Philosophy of Global Problems (Filosofiya global'nykh problem), Moscow: Znanie, 1994; Chinese edition - Beijing, People's University of China, 1996.
- Chumakov, A. N. Globalization. Outlline of the Holistic World (Globalizatsiya. Contury tselostnogo mira), Moscow: Prospect, 2005; 2nd editions in 2009, 2011, 2013, 2014, 2015; 2016; 3rd editions in 2017 (2018; 2019; 2020; 2021; 2023) – 448 p..
- Chumakov, A. N. Metaphysics of Globalization: Cultural-cum-Civilizational Context (Metafizika globalizatsii. Cul'turno-tsivilizatsionnyi kontekst), Moscow: Kanon+, 2006; 2nd editions in 2017 (2021) – 496 p.
- Chumakov, A. N. Global World: Clash of Interests: Monograph. - Moscow: Prospect, 2018; 2019; 2022. – 512 p.
- Chumakov, A. N. The Substance of Contemporary Globalization (Sushchnost' sovremennoi globalizatsii), Astana, ID "Saiasi agartu" of the Institute of System Studies, 2007. – 98 p.
- Chumakov, A. N., Ioseliani, A. D. Philosophical Problems of Globalization. Moscow: University Book, 2015, 172 p.
- Chumakov, A. N., Katsura, A. V., Masur, I. I. Planetary mankind: on the edge of an abyss. Moscow: “Prospect”, 2016; 2021; 2023. – 208 p.
- Chumakov, A. N. Metaphysics of Globalization: Cultural-cum-Civilizational Context (Metafizika globalizatsii. Cul'turno-tsivilizatsionnyi kontekst). 2nd editions, Moscow: Prospect, 2017; 2021. – 496 p.
- Chumakov, A. N. It is not by us that we have been told, and it is not for us to forget. From serious to ridiculous. - M: Publishing and Trade Corporation "Dashkov and K °", 2020; 2021; 2023; 2024; 2026. – 174 p.
- Chumakov, A. N. Path to Philosophy. Works of Different Years: monograph. - Moscow: Prospect, 2021. -- 608 p.
- Chumakov A.N. "Philosophical Steamship": 100 years without repentance: monograph. - Moscow: Prospect, 2022; 2023; 2024; 2025; 2026. - 456 p.

==== Reference books ====
===== English =====
- Global Studies Encyclopedic Dictionary. Edited by Alexander N. Chumakov, Ivan I. Mazour and William C. Gay. With a Foreword by Mikhail Gorbachev. Editions Rodopi B.V., Amsterdam/New York, NY 2014. XI, 531 pp.
- Global studies Encyclopedia. Edited by I.I. Mazour, A.N. Chumakov, W.C. Gay; TsNPP «Dialog». — Moscow, Raduga Publishers, 2003.
- Chumakov, A. N., and Gay, W.C. (eds), Between Past Orthodoxies and the Future of Globalization: Contemporary Philosophical Problems (Leiden, Boston: Brill Rodopi, 2016).
- Nusser K., Tuninetti L., Seubert H., Nitschke H., Chumakov A., Sayamov Y., Mifsud J. G7 & Philosophy. A Philosophical Review of the Political Agenda of the G 7 Summit in Taormina, Italy, 2017. Edited by Stephan C. Roh. – Rome: Link Campus University, 2017.
- Alexander Chumakov. The Globalized World from the Philosophical Point of View (Chinese Edition) / Publisher: Book Jungle, 2018, 244 pp. (in Chinese).
- Global Studies Directory. People, Organizations, Publications. Edited by Alexander N. Chumakov, Ilya V. Ilyin and Ivan I. Mazour. Editions Brill / Rodopi, Leiden/Boston, 2017, 720 pp.
- Russian Philosophy in the Twenty-first Century : an anthology / edited by Mikhail Sergeev, Alexander Chumakov, and Mary Theis; with a foreword by Alyssa DeBlasio. Description: Leiden; Boston : Brill Rodopi, 2021.
- Chumakov, Alexander N. An Unmanaged World: A Philosophical Study of Global Dynamics. Contemporary Russian Philosophy 8. Leiden: Brill, 2026. – 244 p.

===== Russian =====
- Global Studies Encyclopedia (Globalistika: Entsiklopediya), main editors I. I. Mazour, A. N. Chumakov, W. C. Gay, Russian and English language editions, TsNPP «Dialog». — Moscow, Raduga Publishers, 2003.
- Global Studies: International, Interdisciplinary, Encyclopedic Dictionary (Globalistika: Mezhdunarodnyi, mezhdistsiplinarnyi, entsiklopedicheskyi slovar'), main editors I. I. Mazour, A. N. Chumakov, Moscow-St. Petersburg-New York: Elima, Peter, 2006.
- Global Studies. Persons, Organizations, Publications: Encyclopedic References (Globalistika. Personalii, organizatsii, izdaniya: entsiklopedicheskyi spravochnik), editorial board: I. V. Ilyin, I. I. Mazour, A. N. Chumakov, Moscow: Alpha-M, 2012.
- Global Studies. Persons, Organizations, Publications: Encyclopedic References (Globalistika. Personalii, organizatsii, izdaniya: entsiklopedicheskyi spravochnik), editorial board: I. V. Ilyin, I. I. Mazour, A. N. Chumakov. 2nd editions, Moscow: KnoRus, 2016.

==== Textbooks ====
===== Russian =====
- Buchilo, N. F., Chumakov, A. N. Philosophy: Higher Education Textbook (Filosofyia: Uchebnoe posobie dlya vuzov), Moscow: Znanie, 1998 (2nd ed., M.: PER SE, 2001; 3rd ed., 2003; 4th ed., SPb, Piter, 2004; 5th expanded edition, M.: Prospekt Nauki, 2008, 2010 and 2013).
- Buchilo, N. F., Chumakov, A. N. Philosophy: Electronic Textbook (Filosofyia: elektronyi uchebnik) Moscow: KNORUS, 2009 and 2010.
- Kirillov, V. I., Popov, C.I., Chumakov, A. N. (eds) Philosophy. Part One. History of Philosophy: Textbook (Filosofyia. Chast' pervaya. Istorya filisofii: Uchebnoe Posobye), eds., chapters III, IV, X, Moscow: "Yurist", 1996 (2nd expanded edition in 1998, 2002, 2003, 2004, 2005).
- Chumakov, A. N. Globalistics. Textbook. (Globalistika. Metodicheskoe posobie.) Moscow: Moscow State University, 2008 (2nd ed., Moscow: MAKS Press, 2009; 2011).
- Chumakov, A. N. Russia in the Global World: Reality and Perspectives. Textbook. (Rossyia v global'nom mire: real'nost' i perspektivy. Uchebno-metodicheskoe posobye.) Moscow: MAKS Press, 2012.
- Chumakov, A. N. (ed) Philosophy in Professional Activities: Textbook. (Filosofyia v professional'noi deyatel'nosti: Uchebnoye posobye.) "Introduction," Part I, Topics 3 and 12, Moscow: Prospekt, 2013; 2014; 2015; 2016; 2017; 2022.
- Chumakov, A. N. (ed) Philosophy: a Textbook (Filosofyia: Uchebnik), Part I; Part II, Topics 2, 3.1; Part III, Topics 1, 5 (in coauthorship), 8, Moscow: Vuzovskyi uchebnik: NITs INFRA-M, 2013.
- Chumakov A. N. Introduction; section I, topic 3, 12 // Philosophy in professional activity: Textbook. // Ed. prof. A. N. Chumakov. - M .: Prospect, 2013 (reprinted 2014).
- Reader on Philosophy. Textbook. Allowance / ed. prof. A.N. Chumakov. - M .: Yurayt Publishing House, 2015.
- Philosophy: Textbook / Ed. A.N. Chumakov. - M .: University textbook: INFRA-M, 2015; 2016.
- Practical Philosophy. Textbook for Masters: textbook / ed. A. N. Chumakov. Moscow: Prospect, 2017; 2022; 2026.
- Reader on philosophy: textbook. manual / ed. A.N. Chumakov. - Moscow: Prospect, 2017; 2021.
- Philosophy: Textbook / Ed. prof. A. N. Chumakov. - M .: University textbook: SRC INFRA-M, 2013 (2nd ed., Revised and supplemented - M .: University textbook: INFRA-M, 2018).
- Reader on Philosophy. Tutorial. In 2 parts / ed. prof. A.N. Chumakov. - M .: Yurayt, 2017.
- History and Philosophy of Science: a Textbook for Graduate Students and Applicants / ed. prof. M.A. Eskindarov; prof. A. N. Chumakov. - M.: Prospect, 2018; (reprinted 2019; 2023; 2024).
- Philosophy. Textbook / ed. A.N. Chumakov. - 3rd ed., Rev. and add. - M .: Prospect, 2021; 2022.
- Philosophy. Reader: textbook / ed. A. N. Chumakov. - M .: Prospect, 2021.
- Chumakov A. N. Global studies. Lecture course. – M., Prospect, 2026 – P. 378.

==== Collections of Articles ====
===== English =====
- Chumakov A. N. Philosophy of Globalization. Selected articles. Moscow: MAX-PRESS, 2010.
- Chumakov A. N. Philosophy of Globalization. Selected articles. 2nd revised and expanded edition. - Moscow: University Press, 2015, 240 p.
- Chumakov A. N. Philosophy of Globalization. Selected articles – 3rd rev. and expand. ed. – Moscow : Moscow University Press, 2020. — 367 p.
- Chumakov A. N., Grinin L. E. (eds) This Globalizing World Edited by Alexander N. Chumakov and Leonid E. Grinin, Volgograd: ‘Uchitel’ Publishing House, 2015, 224 pp.
- Philosophical Aspects of Globalization: A Multidisciplinary Inquiry / Edited by Alexander N. Chumakov, Alyssa DeBlasio, Ilya V. Ilyin. Description: Leiden ; Boston : Brill Rodopi, 2022. – 447 pp.

=== Selected articles ===
==== English ====
- Chumakov A. N. "Recognizing Globalization," Europa Forum. Philosophie. Bulletin No. 58, April 2008.
- Chumakov A. N. "On the Subject and Boundaries of Global Studies," Age of Globalization. Studies in Contemporary Global Processes. Scientific Journal. # 1, 2008.
- Chumakov A. N. "Social Aspects of Globalization," Europa Forum «Philosophy». Teaching Bulletin 60, February, 2009.
- Chumakov A. N. "An Anthropological Dimension of Globalization," The Human Being in Contemporary Philosophical Conceptions, ed. N. Omelchenko. Cambridge Scholars Publishing, 2009.
- Chumakov A. N. "Philosophy as the Method of Achievement of a Worthy Human Future," Abstracts of the World Philosophy Day Congress 2010. Tegran, 2010.
- Chumakov A. N. "Culture in the Global World: Between Dialogue and Conflict," Globalistics and Globalization Studies. Volgograd: "Uchitel" Publishing House, 2012.
- Chumakov A. N. "The Phenomenon of Globalization," Globalistics, Global Studies, Globalization Studies: Scientific Digest. Moscow, MAKS Press, 2012.
- Chumakov A. N. "What Must We Do [When] Confronted with Globalization?" Age of Globalization. 2013, N 3.
- Chumakov A. N. "Thinking in Time: Lessons from the History of Globalization," Studia Diplomatica. The Brussels Journal of International Relations, Vol. LXVI-1, 2013, pp. 93–99.
- Chumakov A. N. "Theory and Practice of Global Governance: Topical Issues," Procedia - Social and Behavioral Sciences, Vol. 77, April 2013, pp. 198–204.
- Chumakov A. N. "Thinking in Time: Lessons from the History of Globalization," Studia Diplomatica. LXVI-1 (2013) – The Brussels Journal of International Relations. Academia Press (Ghent), 2013, pp. 93–100.
- Chumakov A. N. "Which Attitude Should Politicians Have when Confronted with Globalization?" Europa Forum Philosophie. Bulletin 63. Mai 2014, No. 43, pp. 49–68.
- Chumakov A. N. "Global World: a Problem of Governance," Campus-Wide Information Systems, Vol. 31 No. 2/3, 2014, pp. 108–120.
- Chumakov A. N. "Recognizing Globalization / The Dialectics of Modernity – Recognizing Globalization," Studies on the Theoretical Perspectives of Globalization. Edited by Endre Kiss. - Budapest, 2014. Arisztotelesz Kiado, pp. 19–32.
- Chumakov A.N. Culture in the Global World and Opportunities for Dialogue // Synthesis Philosophica, 62 (2/2016). Zagreb, 2016. P. 71–74.
- Chumakov A.N. Cultural and Civilizational Fractures of the Global World // International Journal of Foresight and Innovation Policy, Vol. 12, Nos. 1/2/3, 2017. P. 58–68.
- Chumakov A.N., Yurchenko P.S. Digitalization and Globalization // Forum Philosophie International, # 69, 2020. P. 77–86.
- Chumakov A.N. From Cultural Pluralism and Civilizational Disintegration to a Global Cultural-cum-civilizational System // Challenges of Globalization and Prospects for an Inter-civilizational World Order / Editor Ino Rossi. St. John's University, New York City, USA, Springer, 2020. pp. 1015–1029.
- Chumakov A.N. Main Trends of Global Development: Its Reality and Prospects // Journal of Chinese Philosophy, 02 Feb 2021. pp. 80–88.
- Chumakov A.N. Historical and Philosophical Aspects of Global Studies in the Modern Scientific System // Russian Philosophy in the Twenty-first Century : an anthology / edited by Mikhail Sergeev, Alexander Chumakov, and Mary Theis; with a foreword by Alyssa DeBlasio. Description: Leiden; Boston : Brill Rodopi, 2021. pp. 32–49.
- Chumakov A.N. The coming demographic avalanche: on the threshold of the great resettlement of peoples // Int. J. Foresight and Innovation Policy, Vol. 15, Nos. 1/2/3, 2021. pp. 171–186.
- Chumakov A.N. Globalization from the Philosophical Point of View // Philosophical Aspects of Globalization: A Multidisciplinary Inquiry / Edited by Alexander N. Chumakov, Alyssa DeBlasio, Ilya V. Ilyin. Description: Leiden; Boston : Brill Rodopi, 2022, pp. 3-22.
- Chumakov A.N. Globalization as a Catalyst for the Development and Decline of Empires // Journal of Chinese Philosophy, Blackwell Publishing Inc. (United Kingdom), 2023, том 50, № 1. pp. 93-103.
- Chumakov A.N. The Origins of Geospheric Thinking and Its Significance for Understanding the Global World // Journal of Globalization Studies. Vilume 14, Number 2 / November, 2023. pp. 27-39.
- Chumakov A.N. De-Globaliztion: Dlusion or Logical Error? // New Global Studies, vol. 19, no. 1, 2025, pp. 67-79.
- Kuçuradi I., McBride W., Scarantino L., Chumakov A. Philosophy Facing World Problems in the TwentyFirst Century // Journal of Globalization Studies, Vol. 16 No. 1, May 2025, pp. 163–177.
- Chumakov A.N. Dialogue Among Cultural and Civilizational Values in the Modern World: Robertson’s Contribution to Global Studies in Russia // From Inter-civilizational Encounters to Inter-civilizational Analysis: Reflections on Robertson’s Views of the Global Human Condition, and Beyond / Editor Ino Rossi, New York City, USA, Springer, 2025. October. XII, 328. Pp. 273-290.

==== Russian ====
- Chumakov A. N. "Contemporary World: on Footstep of Fundamental Transformation" [Sovremenny' mir: na poroge fundamental'nykh transformatsyi], Century of Globalization, #2(2), 2008.
- Chumakov A. N. "Globalization and Cosmopolitanism in the Contemporary Context" [Globalizatsiya i kosmopolitizm v contekste sovremennosti], Questions of Philosophy, #1, 2009.
- Chumakov A. N. "Philosophical Train: from Vladivostok to Moscow" [Filosofskii poezd: ot Vladivostoka do Moskvy], Questions of Philosophy, #1, 2009.
- Chumakov A. N. "Are Anti-heroes Really Guilty?" [Vinovaty li antigeroi?], International Life, #2-3, 2009.
- Chumakov A. N. "Russia in the Global World: Necessity of Adequate Decisions" [Rossiya v global'nom mire: neobhodimost' adekvatnyh reshenii], Century of Globalization, #2(4), 2009.
- Chumakov A. N. "World Crisis as a Chance for Russia" [Mirovoi krizis kak shans dlya Rossii], Bulletin of Moscow University, Series 18: Sociology and Political Science, Volume 17, #3, 2009.
- Chumakov A. N. "Risks of Global World under Crisis Conditions" [Riski global'nogo mira v usloviyakh krizisa], Civilization and Men, scientific [and] educational journal, #2, December, 2010.
- Chumakov A. N. "Mass and Elite Culture as a Product of Globalization," [Massovaya i elitarnaya kul'tury kak product globalizatsii], in the book Russia: Multifacetedness of Culture and Globalization [Rossiya: mnogoobrazie kul'tur i globalizatsiya], Moscow: "Kanon+," 2010.
- Chumakov A. N. "Philosophy as an Indicator of Cultural and Civilizational Development of Society" [Filosofiya kak indicator kul'turno-tsivilizatsionnogo razvitiya obshchestva], Humanitarian Sciences, #1, 2011.
- Chumakov A. N. "Humanitarian Aspect of Globalization: Russian Dimension" [Gumanitarnyi aspect globalizatsii: rossiiskoe izmerenie], analytical and scientific-practical journal, Geopolitics and Security, #4(16), 2011.
- Chumakov A. N. "On the Path to Civil Society" [Na puti k grazhdanskomu obshchestvu], Vestnik RFO, #4(60), 2011.
- Chumakov A. N. "Culture under the Conditions of Global Transformation," [Kul'tura v usloviyakh global'nykh transformatsii], Bulletin of Moscow University, Series XXVII, Globalistics and Geopolitics, #1-2, 2011.
- Chumakov A. N. "Global World: Problems of Governance" [Global'nyi mir: problema upravleniya], Century of Globalization, #2(6), 2010.
- Chumakov A. N. "Globalistics as Part of the System of Contemporary Scientific Knowledge" [Globalistika v sisteme sovremennogo nauchnogo znaniya], Questions of Philosophy, 2012, #7, pg. 3–17.
- Chumakov A. N. "Conflict and Possibilities of Dialogue in the Contemporary World" [Konflikt i vozmozhnosti dialoga v sovremennom mire], Dialogue (Bulgaria), 2012. #2, pg. 1-8 ().
- Chumakov A. N. "Subject of Globalistics" [Predmet globalistiki], Alma mater, Bulletin of Higher Education, 2012, March, #3, pg. 3–6.
- Chumakov A. N. "Problems of Governance as a Reason for Discussion" [Problema upravleniya kak povod dlya diskussii], Century of Globalization, 2012, #2(10), pg. 28–34.
- Chumakov A. N. "Contemporary World in the Cultural and Civilizational Dimensions," [Sovremennyi mir v kul'turno-tsivilizatsionnom izmerenii], Humanitarian Sciences, 2012, #3(7), pg. 86–91.
- Chumakov A. N. "Cultural Context of Globalization" [Kul'turologicheskii kontekst globalizatsii], in the book Dialogue of Cultures under the Circumstances of Globalization [Dialog kul'tur v usloviyakh globalizatsii], Moscow: "Kanon+," 2012.
- Chumakov A. N. "Timely Problems of Contemporary Globalistics: Socio-natural Aspect" [Aktual'nye problemy sovremennoi globalistiki: sotsio-prirodnyi aspect], Philosophical Sciences, #12, 2012.
- Chumakov A. N. "Strengthening International Cooperation in the Construction of Ecological Civilization" [Usilenie mezhdunarodnogo vzaimode'stviya v postroenii ekologicheskoi tsivilizatsii], Humanitarian Sciences, #1(9), 2013.
- Chumakov A. N. "Cultural-civilizational Dialogue as a Way of Solving Problems in the Contemporary World" [Kul'turno-tsivilizatsionnyi dialog kak sposob resheniya problem v sovremennom mire], Questions of Philosophy, #1, 2013.
- Chumakov A. N. "Philosophy in the Contemporary World: Dialogue of Worldviews" [Filosofiya v sovremennom mire: dialog mirovozrenii], Questions of Philosophy, #1, 2013.
- Chumakov A. N. "V. I. Vernadsky's Noosphere: the Philosophical and Natural Sciences Content" [Noosfera V. I. Vernadskogo: filosofskoe i estestvennonauchnoe soderzhanie], Bulletin of Moscow University, Series XXVII, "Globalistics and Geopolitics," #1, 2013.
- Chumakov A. N. “About Globalization from an Objective Point of View” [O globalizatsii s ob"yektivnoy tochki zreniya], Age of Globalization, No. 2 (14), 2014. pp. 39–51.
- Chumakov A. N. “Cultural and Civilizational Faults of the Global World” [Kul'turno-tsivilizatsionnyye razlomy global'nogo mira], Age of Globalization, No 2 (16), 2015, pp. 35–47.
- Chumakov A. N. “Mass Culture as a Product and Satellite of Globalization” [Massovaya kul'tura kak porozhdeniye i sputnik globalizatsii], Bulletin of Moscow University. Series XXVII "Globalistics and Geopolitics" No. 1/2 • 2015 • January–June. pp. 12–131.
- Chumakov A. N. “Language as a Means of Communication and Problem Solving in the Global World” [Yazyk kak sredstvo kommunikatsii i resheniya problem v global'nom mire], Questions of Philosophy, No.12, 2015. pp. 5–14.
- Chumakov A. N. “World Politics in the Context of Globalization” [Mirovaya politika v kontekste globalizatsii], Asia and Africa Today, No. 12, 2016.
- Chumakov A. N. “Modern Russia and the Lessons of the Russian Revolution of 1017” [Sovremennaya Rossiya i uroki russkoy revolyutsii 1017 goda], Bulletin of Moscow State University. Series XXVII, Globalistics and Geopolitics, No.1, 2017. S. 68–79.
- Chumakov A. N. “The Main Trends in World Development: Realities and Prospects” [Osnovnyye trendy mirovogo razvitiya: realii i perspektivy], Age of Globalization, No. 4, 2018. P. 3–15.
- Chumakov A. N. “The Modern World in the European Dimension” [Sovremennyy mir v yevropeyskom izmerenii], Modern Europe, No. 2, 2019. P. 1–8.
- Chumakov A. N. "Philosophical Steamships" and the Historical Fates of Russian Philosophy [«Filosofskiye parokhody» i istoricheskiye sud'by russkoy filosofii], Russian Humanitarian Journal, 2020, Vol. 9. No.1. S. 3–15.
- Chumakov A. N. “Environmental Culture as the Basis of Environmental Protection” [Ekologicheskaya kul'tura kak osnova prirodookhrannoy deyatel'nosti], Use and Protection of Natural Resources in Russia, No. 3 (163), 2020. P. 114–120.
- Chumakov A. N. “Globalistics in the Context of Modernity: a Pandemic Test” [Globalistika v kontekste sovremennosti: ispytaniye pandemiyey], Age of Globalization, No. 3 (35), 2020. P. 3–14.
- Chumakov A. N. “The Global World from a Literary Point of View (based on the work of M. I. Weller)” [Global'nyy mir s literaturnoy tochki zreniya (na osnove tvorchestva M. I. Vellera)], Age of Globalization, No. 1 (37), 2021. P. 32–44.
- Chumakov A. N. “Globalization and Digitalization: Social Consequences of Cumulative Interaction” [Globalizatsiya i tsifrovizatsiya: sotsial'nyye posledstviya kumulyativnogo vzaimodeystviya ], Questions of Philosophy, 2021, No. 8. P. 36–46.
- Chumakov A. N. Geospheric Thinking as a Condition for Understanding the Integrity of the World and Preventing War // Age of Globalization, 2022, No. 2 (42). Pp. 3-18.
- Chumakov A. N. Civilizational Development in the Context of Globalization and Cultural Differentiation of the Modern World // Discourse-Pi. 2025. Vol. 22. No. 4. Pp. 10-23.
- Chumakov A. N. The Global World from the Perspective of East and West: Philosophical and Ideological Aspects // Age of Globalization. 2026. No. 1 (57). Pp. 3-15.

==== Chinese ====
- Chumakov A. N. "The Globalized World that Faces Reconstruction," Teaching and Research, # 11, 2009 (Beijing, China).
- Chumakov A. N. "Globalistics as Interdisciplinary Field of Research," journal Values and Culture, #6, December 2009 (Beijing, China).
- Chumakov A. N. "Philosophy in Front of the Challenge of Globalization," Bulletin of Jianghai, (Jianghai Academic Journal), #1, 2011.
- Chumakov A. N. "Multiple Modernities as a Condition of Development of the Modern World," Academic Forum Collected Papers. -Institute for Advanced Humanistic Studies, PKU, China, 2014.
- Chumakov A. N. “Culture in the Global World and Constructing Ecological Civilization”, Traditional Culture Promotes Ecological Civilization / The 6-th International Symposium on Traditional Culture and Eco-civilization (September 16–18, 2015). Jiamusi City, Heilongjiang Province, China. 2015. pp. 86–96.
- Chumakov A. N. “The value of Dialogue between Cultures and Civilizations in the Globalized World”, Teaching and Research, #5 (451), 2016. pp. 82–88.
- Chumakov A. N. The Transformation of the Modern Society and Hindrance in Civilization Conversation”, Songshan, 2018. #1, pp. 26–31.
- Chumakov A. N. “From Cultural Pluralizm and Zivilizational Disintegration to a Sharing Future”, Multicultural Coexistence, Harmonious Symbiosis, Sharing Future. Songshan Forum. – Denfeng, China, 2018. – 467 с. pp. 11–18.
- Chumakov A. N. “From Cultural Pluralism and Civilization Metamorphosis to Future Sharing”, Songshan, 2019. #3, pp. 59–63.
- Chumakov A. N. Ethics and Values in a Global World from a Philosophical Point of View // Ethical Research, #6, Southeast University Press (China), 2021, pp. 34-43.
- Chumakov A. N. Global World Facing New Challenges // What is our common destiny? Ethical reflections on the global public health crisis. Collection. Songshan Forum, 2020: a collective monograph / [author's call.] ; ed . Tu Weiming, Zhang Guangzhi. – Beijing: Guangming Daily Publishing House, 2022, pp. 290-295.
- Chumakov A. N. How is cross-cultural dialogue possible in the global world? // International Forum "Ethical-Moral Development and the Chinese Path to Modernity" (Nov. 24 - 26, 2023). - Moral Development Institute (MDI) of Southeast University, Nanjing, China. 2023, pp. 635-639.
- Chumakov A. N. Globalization or Deglobalization? // Global Studies 2024 / Ed. Xue Xiaoyuan, Shen Xiangping. – Beijing: Central Compilation and Translation Publishing House (CCTP), 2024, pp. 42-57.
- Chumakov A. N. Cultural-civilizational and Etical Aspects of the Global World // Abstracts - Ethics & Civilization - May 23 2025. – Nanjing, Southeast University, 2025, pp. 6-8.

=== Editorial work ===
- Editor-in-chief, journal Vek globalizatsii (Age of Globalization, from 2008).
- Editor-in-chief, journal Vestnik RFO (Bulletin of Russian Philosophical Society – 1997-2018).
- Editor-in-chief of the periodical Trudy chlenov RFO (Works of the members of Russian Philosophical Society – 2001-2018).
- Deputy editor, Gumanitarnye nauki. Vestnik Finansovogo universiteta (Humanitarian Sciences. Bulletin of the University of Finances – 2011-2018).
- Annual Report on China-Russia Cultural Exchange 2018-2019. / Editors-in-Chief - Li He, A.N. Chumakov. - Beijing (China): Publishing House of the Chinese Academy of Social Sciences. 2021. – 460 p.
- Member of the editorial boards, journals Geopolitika i bezopasnost' (Geopolitics and Security), Vestnik MGU. Seriya XXVII Globalistika i geopolitika (Bulletin of Moscow State University. Series XXVII Globalistics and Geopolitics), Filosofiya i kul'tura (Philosophy and Culture), Rossiyskiy gumanitarnyy zhurnal (Russian Humanitarian Journal), Diskurs-Pi (Discourse-Pi), Yevraziyskiy yuridicheskiy zhurnal (Eurasian Law Journal), Prostranstvo i vremya (Space and Time), Kaspyiskyi region (Caspian Region), Credo New, Journal of Globalization Studies, Dialogue (Bulgaria), Litera, Open Journal of Social Sciences (USA). Journal of Multidisciplinary Educational Research; International Journal of Creative Research Thoughts; Researcher. European Journal of Humanities & Social Sciences.
