= Alexander Shaganov =

Russian poet and songwriter (born 1965)

- Born: March 4, 1965 (age 61)
- Occupation: songwriter
- Website: shaganov.ru

Alexander Alexeyevich Shaganov (Russian: Алекса́ндр Алексе́евич Шага́нов; March 4, 1965, Moscow) is a Russian poet, songwriter, and lyricist for many well-known pop songs.

In 1987 he graduated from the Moscow Electrotechnical Institute of Communications. He worked as a telecommunications engineer Mostelefonstroy operator recording studio Zvuk, he gave concerts as a singer.

Alexander Shaganov's fame came with the song Vladimir Rus' to the music of Dmitri Warsawsky band Chorny Kofe (1986) in the wake of the interest of the domestic audience to hard rock and heavy metal.

He worked as a lyricist with Dmitry Malikov, Zhenya Belousov, Alexander Rybkin, Sergey Chumakov, Sofia Rotaru, Vlad Stashevsky, Yevgeny Kulikov, Alexander Kalyanov, Alexander Barykin, Alla Pugacheva, Katya Lel, the groups Lyube, Na Na, Ivanushki International, Korni. Music for many poems written by Shaganov is by a friend of the poet, composer Igor Matvienko.

Winner of Ovation (1992) and the Valentin Kataev Prize (the magazine Yunost, 1996).

In 2007 he published a book with the publishing house Tsentrpoligraf Alexander Shaganov I Shaganov for Moscow.
