= Mikhail Chumachenko =

Ukrainian separatist

Mikhail Chumachenko is a leader of the Donbas People's Militia and a Ukrainian separatist who was detained by the Security Service of Ukraine on March 22, 2014.
