= Chumak =

Historic occupation on the territory of the modern Ukraine

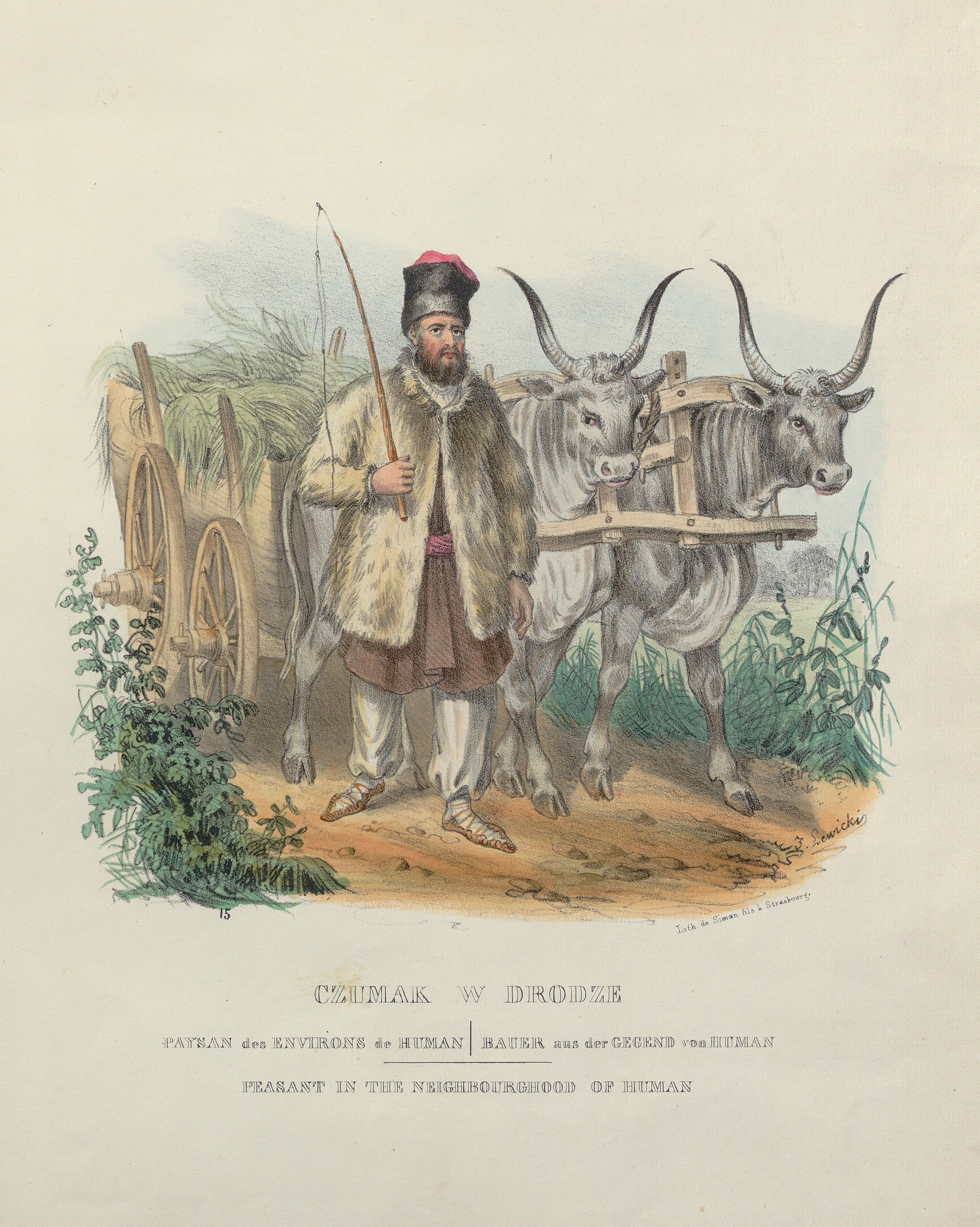
- Chumak, 1841

Occupation
- Activity sectors: hauling, trading, salt-industry

Chumak (Ukrainian: чумак) was a historical and traditional wagon-based trading occupation in Ukraine in the late Medieval and early Modern periods of history. It involved the delivery of goods (salt, fish, grain, and others) for the purpose of long-distance sales using carts (wagons) harnessed to oxen.

Chumaks developed as a merchant class facilitating the trade in salt from the areas of Halychyna as well as the coastal areas of Black and Azov Seas, in addition to other items.

They prospered until the end of the 19th century, when competition from railroads made longer trade-routes unprofitable. Chumaks transported goods in wagons pulled by two oxen paired with a yoke. The oxen were often of the Bessarabian breed.

Chumaks operated most commonly during the times of the Cossack Hetmanate (17th century), trading between the Moscow state, the Polish–Lithuanian Commonwealth, the Crimean Khanate, and Moldavia. Modernization marginalized traditional economic activity, and relegated Chumak traders to areas in western Ukraine with the lowest levels of service.

== Influence on Ukrainian culture ==
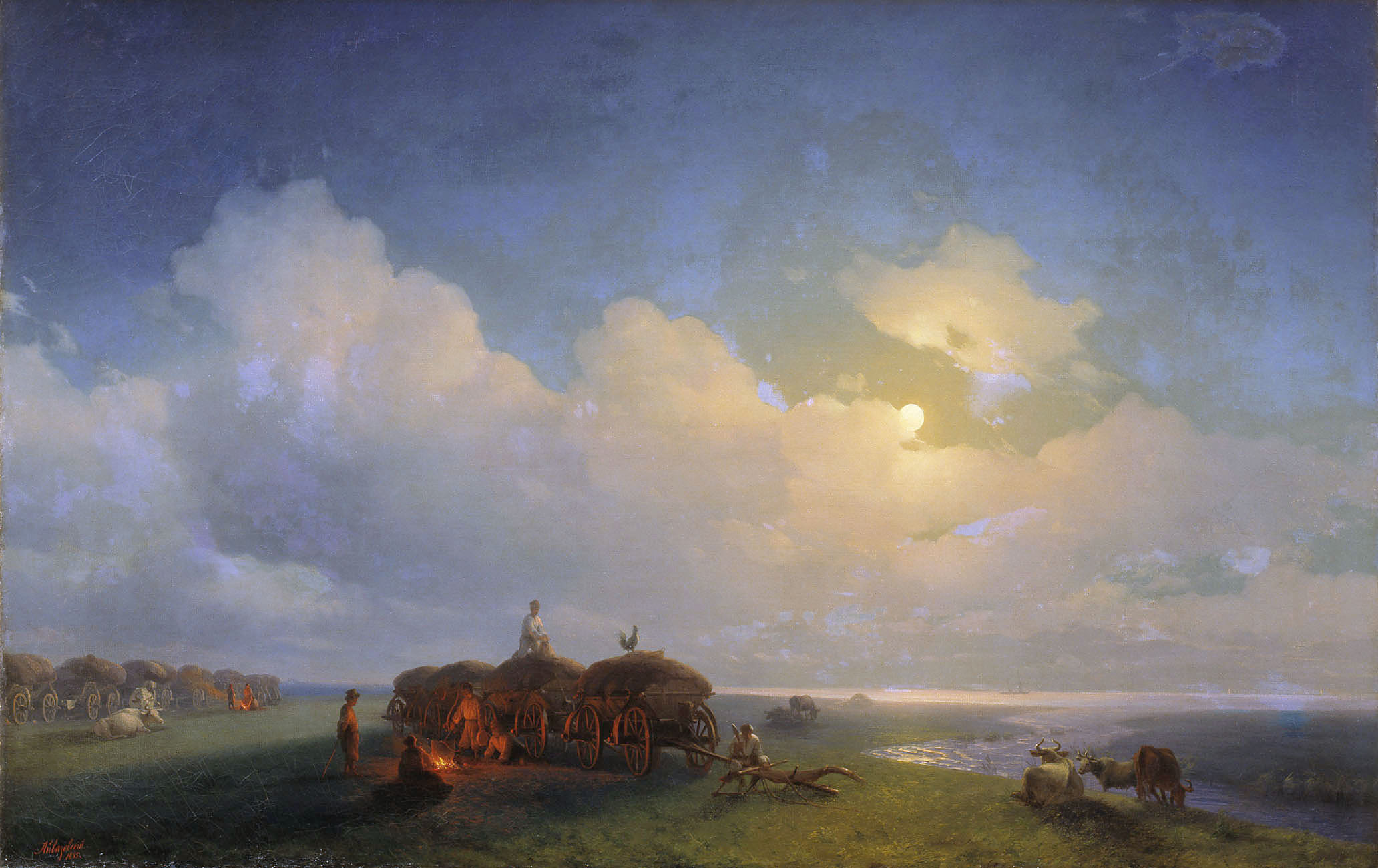
1885 oil painting "Чумаки на отдыхе" (lit. 'Chumaks on Vacation', likely referring to a temporary break) by Ivan Aivazovsky

The chumak way of life had great influence on Ukrainian folklore, language, and overall culture, due to the hardships and perils inherent in that trade.

In the Ukrainian language the Milky Way is called the Chumaks' Way. There is a Ukrainian surname Chumak.

Chumak traders featured prominently in Ukrainian folklore and fables. They feature in the literal as well as artistic works of Taras Shevchenko (1814–1861), of the Crimean-Armenian painter Ivan Aivazovsky (1817–1900), and in the song Ukraina by Taras Petrynenko (1953– ).

== See also ==
- Zaporozhian Sich
