= Chumak (dance) =

Chumak (Ukrainian: Чyмaк) is a popular folk dance from Ukraine. In it, the dancers reenact the lives of salt-merchants. The dancers begin by interpreting mining salt from a cave, they then proceed to go through the desalinization process, which allows them to sprinkle their salt on pretzels, all while dancing. It is performed by amateurs, professional Ukrainian dance ensembles as well as other performers of folk dances.

In one of the versions of the dance a young boy has finished hard work as a salt merchant and while walking home he decided to have some fun by dancing. In the dance the boy is wearing a straw hat and traditional Ukrainian clothes with a belt. While dancing the boy got carried away and falls to the ground injuring himself in the eyes of the audience. After a couple seconds the young boy gets up, shrugs off the pain and continues to dance all the way home.
