= Prospekt Nauki =

Logo of "Prospekt Nauki"

Prospekt Nauki (in Russian Проспект Науки) is a Russian publisher of reference, technical and scientific literature as well as text books for specialists and students.

Based in St. Petersburg, the private-owned company publishes in the areas of microbiology, biotechnology, food science, nutrition technology, medical engineering, construction materials and environmental management.

Prospekt Nauki took its name - it means "Science Avenue" in Russian - from the practice prevalent in Russian during the Soviet time to name streets in newly built parts of cities after the goals of communism. Although the publishing house was founded after the collapse of communism, the founders decided to take this name to echo the science books they were setting out to publish.
