= Horse Creek (Tennessee River tributary) =

Stream in Tennessee, U.S.

Coordinates: 35.3011899°N 88.1942017°W

Horse Creek is a stream in the U.S. state of Tennessee. It is a tributary of the Tennessee River.

According to a 19th-century story, Horse Creek once was the hideout of horse thieves, hence the name.

Tributaries of Horse Creek include Holland Creek.
