= Horsemaning =

Photography trend

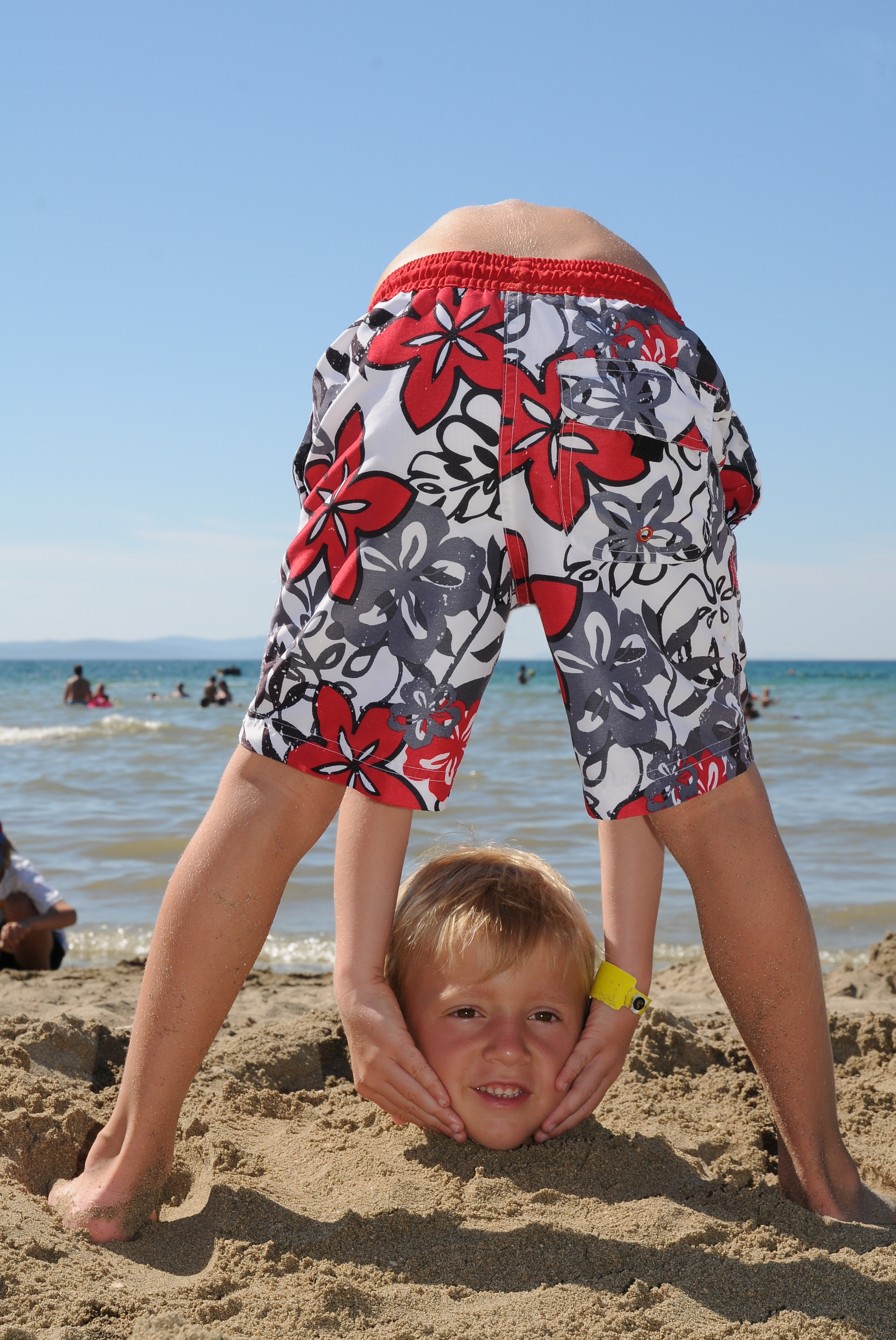
Modern horsemaning

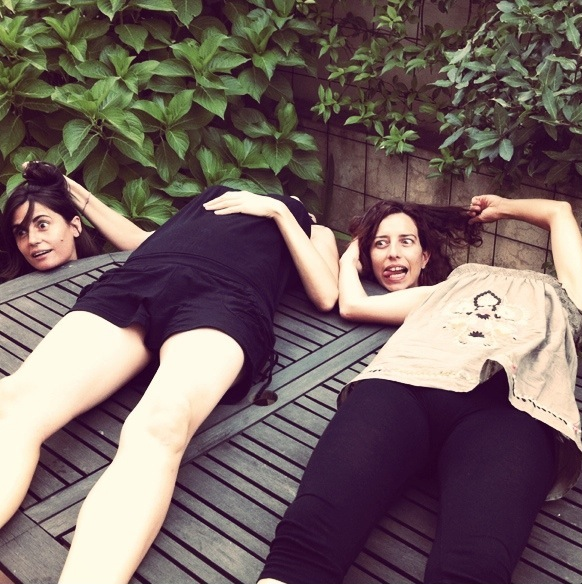
A modern example of horsemaning

Horsemaning (or horsemanning) is the act of posing for a photograph in such a way that the subject appears to have been beheaded, their head resting on the ground or on a surface. Such photography was a fad in the 1920s. The practice derives its name from the Headless Horseman, an evil character from Washington Irving's short story "The Legend of Sleepy Hollow".

Horsemaning saw a revival in 2011, along with other photo fads such as planking and owling. All three were considered among the top 10 Facebook sensations of 2011 and a series of horsemaning photos began trending on sites like BuzzFeed as people were inspired to recreate the original fad. It has also become popular with beachgoers, one person is buried in the sand with her body covered and another person lies next to her with her head buried in the sand.

== Description ==
The objective of horsemanning is to make it appear that the photo's subject has been beheaded. Horsemanning requires two individuals, one situated with one's head hidden (e.g. tilted backwards) with the other hiding his or her body and exposing only his or her head. The resulting photo appears to show a headless body with a disembodied head lying beside it; in fact, it consists of one person's body and a different person's head.

== See also ==
- Planking (fad)
- Victorian headless portrait
