= Horse Range (Oregon) =

Mountain range in Oregon, United States

- Location within Oregon

Highest point
- Elevation: 610 m (2,000 ft)

Geography
- Country: United States
- State: Oregon
- District: Josephine County
- Range coordinates: 42°39′36.407″N 123°41′34.271″W
- Topo map: USGS Bunker Creek

The Horse Range is a mountain range in Josephine County, Oregon, United States.
