= Chumak (surname) =

The surname Chumak, from the Ukrainian term chumak, may refer to:

- Allan Chumak (1935–2017), Russian hypnotist and faith healer
- Dmytro Chumak (fencer) (born 1980), Ukrainian épée fencer
- Dmytro Chumak (weightlifter) (born 1964), Ukrainian weightlifter
- Igor Chumak (born 1964), Russian team handball player
- Maxym Chumak (1984–2023), Ukrainian judoka
- Nestor Chumak (born 1988), Canadian bassist for PUP
- Roman Chumak (born 1982), Ukrainian football goalkeeper
- Yevhen Chumak (born 1995), Ukrainian football midfielder
- Yuriy Chumak (born 1962), Ukrainian former football goalkeeper
