= Horse Range (California) =

Mountain range in California, United States

- Location within California

Highest point
- Elevation: 2,168 m (7,113 ft)

Geography
- Country: United States
- State: California
- District: Nevada County
- Range coordinates: 39°20′58.659″N 120°18′33.725″W
- Topo map: USGS Norden

The Horse Range is a mountain range in Nevada County, California, United States.
