= Horse Creek (California) =

Location
- Country: United States
- State: California
- County: Solano

Physical characteristics
- Mouth: Ulatis Creek

Horse Creek is a stream in Solano County, California which discharges into Ulatis Creek.

== Floodplain ==
The U.S. government has designated a portion of Horse Creek within the 100-year floodplain. In particular, within unincorporated Solano County approximately 500 feet (150 m) downstream and 1,500 feet (460 m) upstream of Willow Avenue are a designated 100-year floodplain. For incorporated Vacaville areas, along Horse Creek approximately 800 feet (240 m) downstream of Leisure Town Road and approximately 2,000 feet (600 m) upstream of the sewer maintenance area are designated within the 100-year floodplain.

For the Middle Branch Horse Creek, 100-year flood designations were made immediately upstream of Interstate 80 and approximately 2,200 feet (670 m) upstream of Interstate 505.

== See also ==
- List of rivers in California
