= Headless Horseman Hayrides and Haunted Houses =

Headless Horseman Hayride and Haunted Houses
- Type: Haunted attraction
- Industry: Theatre
- Genre: Theatrical/Interactive
- Founded: September 20, 1992
- Founder: Michael and Nancy Jubie
- Headquarters: Ulster Park, New York, United States
- Area served: National
- Services: Entertainment
- Owner: Michael and Nancy Jubie
- Number of employees: 350+
- Website: Headless Horseman Hayrides

The Headless Horseman Hayrides and Haunted Houses (or H5) is an outdoor haunted attraction in the Hudson Valley area of New York. It's located in Ulster Park, about 6 miles (9.7 km) from Kingston, New York. This haunted attraction covers 65 acres (260,000 m^{2}) and includes a hayride, corn maze, and five haunted houses.

== Background ==
Michael and Nancy Jubie opened the hayride for the Halloween season in 1992, stemming from a disguise business Michael Jubie developed during his time as an undercover police officer with the New York Police Department, and inspired by the couple's love of Halloween. As of 2015, it featured twelve distinct attractions and employed over 350 people during the season. H5 is located on a 65-acre (260,000 m^{2}), 200-year-old farm.

== Attractions ==
=== Hayride ===
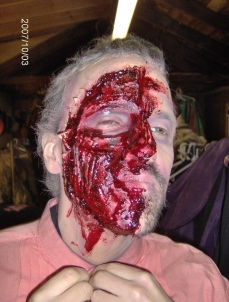
Storyteller dressing to guide wagon riders on the hayride

The hayride takes place on a wagon which holds 25–30 people, and is facilitated by a "storyteller," an actor who is on the wagon for the ride. Each year the hayride has a different theme, and the storyteller narrates a tale and interacts with other characters.

=== Corn maze ===
Numerous actors are hidden in a one-way maze to scare passersby. There are several buildings throughout the maze such as The Lunar Motel, Gluttons Diner and Slaughter House, The Horseman’s Tomb, Dr. Dark’s Black Spider Circus Sideshow, and The Nightshade Greenhouse.

=== Haunted houses ===
Several haunted houses, each updated annually with a new theme, are also part of the attraction.

==== The Creature ====
Appearing in 2007, the Creature was a 150-foot (46 m)-long inflated attraction that appeared to be a sleeping dinosaur or dragon. Customers passed through the mouth and walked past internal organs on their way through to the back.

== Other activities ==
H5 includes four eating establishments (Croaked Crow Café, Evil Eatery, Witch Hazel's and Deadly Doughnut) and four gift shops (Magic Moon Gifts, Ghoulish Gifts, Phantom Photos, and Scare wear).

=== Charity benefits ===
- 2013 & 2014: Hosted Bark-for-Life event to raise money for cancer.
- 2008: Profits from opening night were donated to the Children's Annex, an autism services provider in the Hudson Valley.
- 2007: A behind-the-scenes look at the hayride was used to raise money for The Queen's Galley, a Kingston, New York-based food bank.

=== Frosty Fest ===
In 2007 the owners relaunched Frosty Fest, a Christmas-themed event that had originally been conceived and attempted early in the attraction's run.
