= Aleksandr Chumakov (footballer) =

Soviet footballer

Personal information
- Full name: Aleksandr Dmitriyevich Chumakov
- Date of birth: 5 May 1948
- Place of birth: Moscow, USSR
- Date of death: 8 July 2012 (aged 64)
- Place of death: Moscow, Russia
- Positions: Midfielder; defender

Senior career*
Years	Team	Apps	(Gls)
1966–1972	FC Torpedo Moscow	125	(7)

International career
1968–1969	USSR	3	(0)
- * Club domestic league appearances and goals

Aleksandr Dmitriyevich Chumakov (Russian: Александр Дмитриевич Чумаков) (5 May 1948 – 8 July 2012) was a Soviet football player.

== Career ==
Born in Moscow, Chumakov made 125 Soviet Top League appearances for FC Torpedo Moscow from 1966 to 1972. He finished his playing career with FC Spartak Semipalatinsk in 1975.

Chumakov made three appearances for the USSR during 1968 and 1969, his debut having been on 16 June 1968 in a friendly against Austria.

== Honours ==
- Soviet Cup winner: 1968, 1972.
