= Michael Ansell =

British soldier and horse rider (1905–1994)

Colonel Sir Mike Ansell CBE DSO
- Ansell in March 1951.

Personal information
- Full name: Michael Picton Ansell
- Nationality: British
- Discipline: Show jumping
- Born: 26 March 1905; Curragh, County Kildare, Ireland
- Died: 17 February 1994 (aged 88); Brighton, England

Colonel Sir Michael Picton Ansell, CBE, DSO (26 March 1905 – 17 February 1994) was a soldier, showjumper, polo player, and horse show administrator.

== Early life ==
Ansell was born on 26 March 1905 at the Curragh, County Kildare. His father Lt Col George Ansell was killed in September 1914, during the First World War, leading the 5th Dragoon Guards in a cavalry charge against German positions, for which he was subsequently mentioned in dispatches. After attending St Michael's Westgate-in-Sea and Wellington College he went to Royal Military College, Sandhurst.

== Military career ==
In August 1924 he was commissioned into the 5th/6th Dragoons, a regiment formed two years earlier by the amalgamation of the 5th Dragoon Guards and 6th (Inniskilling) Dragoons (his father having served in both regiments). He served throughout the 1930s a cavalry officer, show jumping rider, and international polo player.

In France in March 1940, during World War II, he was given command of a yeomanry regiment, the 1st Lothians and Border Horse, becoming the British Army's youngest commanding officer at the time. He was appointed Companion of the Distinguished Service Order (DSO) in 1944, but was shortly afterwards wounded in the hand and eyes by "friendly fire", blinding him permanently, and then became a prisoner of war (POW). All four fingers on his injured left hand were later amputated. He was repatriated from a German POW camp in 1943.

From 1957 to 1962 he was Colonel of the 5th Royal Inniskilling Dragoon Guards.

== Showjumping ==
An invitation to take up the position of chairman of the British Showjumping Association led to him being credited with revitalising the sport. He restarted the Royal International Horse Show and initiated the Horse of the Year Show. He was Chairman of the British Horse Society and Chaired the British Showjumping Association from 1945 until 1964. He was the first president of the British Equestrian Federation.

== Honours/Affiliations ==
In 1967, when his address was given as "Pillhead House, Bideford", he was High Sheriff of Devon. He was President of St Dunstan's, a charity for blind servicemen, from 1977 to 1986.

Picton was made a Commander of the Order of the British Empire (CBE) in the 1951 New Year Honours and a Knight Bachelor (Kt) in the 1968 New Year Honours.

He appeared on the television programme This Is Your Life on 28 March 1960, and as a castaway on the BBC Radio programme Desert Island Discs on 14 July 1973.

His autobiography, Soldier On, was published in 1973. It had a foreword by the Duke of Edinburgh. His final book, Leopard: the story of my horse, featured a foreword by Prince Charles.

In 1977, he was a recipient of the Silver Olympic Order.

== Death ==
He died on 17 February 1994 in Brighton, England, aged 88.

== Bibliography ==
- —— (1951). Show Jumping: Obstacles and Courses. Collins.
- —— (1954). Jumping. Naldrett Press.
- —— (1973). Soldier On. Peter Davies. ISBN 978-0432005866.
- —— (1974). Riding High. Peter Davies. ISBN 978-0432005873.
- —— (1980). Leopard: the story of my horse. Quartilles International Limited. ISBN 978-0903021173.
