= Aleksandr Chumakov (sailor) =

Russian sailor (1927–2019)

Personal information
- Born: 15 April 1927
- Died: 23 July 2019 (aged 92)

Sport
- Country: Russia

Aleksandr Chumakov (15 April 1927 – 23 July 2019) was a Russian sailor who competed for the Soviet Union in the 1952 Summer Olympics and in the 1956 Summer Olympics.
