= Sergey Chumakov (singer) =

Russian singer (born 1972)

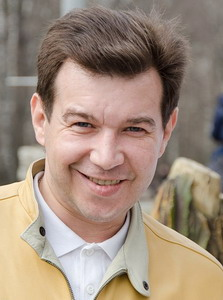

Background information
- Born: Sergey Sergeevich Chumakov; 7 June 1972 (age 54); Moscow
- Genres: Pop, Russian pop
- Occupation: Singer
- Years active: 1988–present

Sergey Sergeevich Chumakov (Russian: Серге́й Серге́евич Чумако́в) (born 7 June 1972, Moscow) is a Soviet and Russian pop singer.

In 1988, Sergey met with the poet Alexander Shaganov, who later would become his producer (1991–93). In 1990 Sergey became acquainted with the composer Valery Bashenev, who wrote the music for most of his songs. In February 1991 Chumakov became the winner of the TV contest Morning Star. In May of the same year Chumakov toured Ukraine with the group Lyube. In 1991–94 Chumakov toured extensively in Russia and CIS countries, participated in various competitions and contests. In Hit 92 in St. Petersburg, Chumakov won the first prize. In 1993 he stopped his creative collaboration with Shaganov. Composer Igor Azarov became the new producer. He released the album Go Ahead-Walk, but only the title track and the song Nikita Married became hits and the album failed to repeat the success of the debut album.

The next producer was Chumakov Alexey Muscatin. Chumakov began working in the style of Western music of the 1950-1960s. Influences on his work included notable performers such as Elvis Presley, Paul Anka, Louis Prima, and the band Creedence Clearwater Revival. During this period, while losing popularity. Chumakov even made peace with Alexander Shaganov. In the third album for the first time he included a few songs on Shaganov's poems. However, an attempt to execute Chumakov ersatz Western music failed. The album has completely failed and Chumakov disappeared from the scene.

According to Shaganov, Chumakov's fading career could be attributed to conflict with Alla Pugacheva and the singer's addiction to alcohol.

In 2010 Chumakov resumed his musical career.
