= Ibrahim (stallion) =

Show jumping stallion

- Sire: The Last Orange
- Dam: Vaillante
- Sex: Male
- Foaled: 1952; France
- Died: 1973 (aged 20–21)
- Color: Bay

Ibrahim (April 18, 1952 – 1973) was a bay half-bred stallion, theoretically Anglo-Norman, but registered as Selle Français. Particularly prolific, his descendants excelled at the highest level in show jumping. Ibrahim became famous after his death.

== History ==
Ibrahim was born at René Haize's stud farm on April 18, 1952. He was bought for 500 francs by horse dealer Alfred Lefevre at a local fair. In 1956, this young horse became champion of his age class. He was sold to the National Stud of Saint-Lô, becoming a public stallion from 1956 to 1973 at the Sartilly breeding station near St-Lô. He had little success at first, as the stallions chosen by this public stud were not tested for their sporting performance.

Ibrahim remained relatively unknown during his lifetime.

== Description ==
Ibrahim measured 1.64 m, had a bay coat, and had one-quarter Thoroughbred blood. Breeder Germain Levallois described him as "very square", with a back "like a table". He also mentioned the elegance of his head, "very wide between the two eyes", and his gait "sparkling with intelligence".

== Sire line tree ==
Sire line descendant tree
- Ibrahim
  - Petit Prince C
  - Quastor
    - Fair Play III
      - Larry II
      - Mazarin V
      - Narcos II
        - Trophée du Rozel
        - Twist du Vallon
        - Urbain du Monnai
        - Viking du Tillard
        - Harcos
        - Hinault
        - Hold Up Premier
        - Tangelo van de Zuuthoeve
          - Cavallo C
          - Triple
          - Vigaro
            - Dortmund HS
            - El Salvador
        - Kouros d’Helby
          - Bintang II
    - Lieu de Rampan
  - Taneal
  - Ukase
  - Val de Loire B
  - Adagio
  - Alcazar D
  - Arteban
  - Cor de Chasse
  - Double Espoir
    - Lisou Blinois
    - Valespoir Malabry
    - Apache d’Adriers
      - Huron des Gerbaux
      - Idem de B’Neville
    - Avec Espoir
    - Bayard d’Elle
    - Bey de Sèvres
    - Flipper d'Elle
      - Master de Ménardière
      - Mediator
      - Napoleon du Chanu
      - Nelson des Forets
      - Ol Metta
      - Prince des Vaux
  - Kibrahim (Digne Espoir)
  - Elf III
  - Espoir
  - Fleuri du Manoir
  - Gibramino
  - Hedjaz
  - Almé Z
    - Galoubet A
      - Qredo de Paulstra
        - Caloubet Wood
        - Corsaire de Vauban
        - Quattro B (Ciel d’Espoir)
        - Elf of Jaunière
        - Epson Love
        - Experio
        - Lassergut Hym d’Isigny
        - Idalgo du Donjon
        - VDL Groep Sabech d’Ha
      - Quabri de Laleu
      - Quatoubet du Rouet
      - Quick Star
        - Cardinus
        - Qualitative
        - Quality
        - Quebec
        - Quinticus
        - Obos Quality
        - Quality Touch Z
        - Quilot Z
        - Qualandro
        - Quick Lauro Z
        - Quilfilio
        - Quick Star CH
        - Red Star D'Argent
        - Indy Star
        - Quincy Z
        - Quick Study
        - Star Power
        - Orient Express
        - Vito M
        - Big Star
        - Papillon de Brekka
        - Petrus de Plessis
      - Touchdown
      - Skippy II
        - Quorum de Laubry
        - Versailles vd Begijnakker
        - Virus de Laubry
        - Apollo van het Lindenbos
      - Surcouf de Revel
      - Vert et Rouge
      - Baloubet du Rouet
        - Gatsby Vandrin
        - Gershwin de Reis
        - Balou du Rouet
        - Balou Grande Z
        - Chaman
        - Southwind
        - West Side van de Meerputhoeve
        - Babluche van het Gelutt Z
        - Bogeno
        - Bubalu
        - Murat de Reve
        - Napoli du Ry
        - Palloubet d'Halong
        - G & C Arrayan (Antonie W)
        - Balturo
      - Caloubet du Rouet
      - En avant du Rouet
      - Premium de Laubry
      - Pall Mall
      - Taloubet Z
    - I Love You
    - Jalisco B
      - Olisco
        - Gold du Talus
      - Papillon Rouge
        - Helios de la Cour II
        - Icare du Manet
        - Iasco Mouche
        - Mozart des Hayettes
        - Tresor
      - Quidam de Revel
        - Guidam
        - Belsedène d’Amaury
        - Nabab de Reve
        - Darios V
        - Diabolo du Parc
        - Dollars Boy
        - Tlaloc La Silla
        - Eyken des Fontenis
        - Happy Villiers
        - Hermès St Lois
        - Huppydam des Horts
        - Quinar Z
        - Jadis de Toscane
        - Quaprice de Bois Margot
        - Quasimodo Z
        - Quidams Rubin
        - Verde TN
        - Paris-Texas
        - Sterrehof’s Calimero
      - Quito de Baussy
      - Rochet M
      - Scherif d'Elle
      - Djalisco du Guet
      - Dollar du Mûrier
        - Idéal de la Loge
    - Jalme des Musnuls
    - Joyau d’Or A
    - Alexis Z
    - Lord Gordon
    - Ahorn Z
      - Aar
      - Amaro
      - Antares
      - Lord Arico
      - Acord I
      - Acapulco
      - Acord II
        - Action Hero
        - Ars Vivendi
        - Broere VDL Atlantic
        - Acorado
        - Antaeus
        - In Style
        - As di Villagana
        - Alboretto
        - All In One
        - VDL Atlantic
      - Acord III
    - Aerobic
    - Aloubé Z
    - Athlet Z
      - Adelfos
        - Pégase du Mûrier
    - Vico
    - Almeo
    - Aladin Z
    - Animo
    - Artos Z
    - Ilmeo

== Pedigree ==
Pedigree of Ibrahim (1952-1973)
Sire The Last Orange (1941)	Orange Peel (1919-1940)	Jus d'Orange (1912)	St. Just (1907)
Sire The Last Orange (1941)	Orange Peel (1919-1940)	Jus d'Orange (1912)	Orange Queen (1904)
Sire The Last Orange (1941)	Orange Peel (1919-1940)	Rirette II (1913)	Ajax (1901)
Sire The Last Orange (1941)	Orange Peel (1919-1940)	Rirette II (1913)	Golden key (1901)
Sire The Last Orange (1941)	Velleda (1921)	Horloger (1907)	Aunay (1900)
Sire The Last Orange (1941)	Velleda (1921)	Horloger (1907)	Scabieuse (1896)
Sire The Last Orange (1941)	Velleda (1921)	Lapin (1911)	No info
Sire The Last Orange (1941)	Velleda (1921)	Lapin (1911)	No info
Dam Vaillante (1943)	Porte Bonheur (1937)	Royal Chestnut (1917)	No info
Dam Vaillante (1943)	Porte Bonheur (1937)	Royal Chestnut (1917)	No info
Dam Vaillante (1943)	Porte Bonheur (1937)	Histoire (1929)	No info
Dam Vaillante (1943)	Porte Bonheur (1937)	Histoire (1929)	No info
Dam Vaillante (1943)	Querqueville (1938)	Vas-y donc (1921)	No info
Dam Vaillante (1943)	Querqueville (1938)	Vas-y donc (1921)	No info
Dam Vaillante (1943)	Querqueville (1938)	Cancale (1925)	No info
Dam Vaillante (1943)	Querqueville (1938)	Cancale (1925)	No info

== Descendants ==
Ibrahim had 315 registered foals. He became one of the most used stallions in the 1960s and 1970s. His success as a breeder was late, as Ibrahim mostly covered Norman draft mares during his early years at the stud. In 1957, he sired the mare Norvale, who became a broodmare for a few years before competing internationally in show jumping with Jean-Michael Gaud. Other descendants of Ibrahim, such as Petit Prince C and Quo Vadis, achieved success. However, it was not until Tango C had a successful show jumping career that Ibrahim became a highly sought-after stallion. While he only bred a few times a year until 1966, he now covered an average of 25 mares per year, with a record of 54 mares in 1969. According to breeder Germain Levallois, it was not uncommon for the first 15 prize-winning foals in breeding competitions at that time to all be sons and daughters of Ibrahim. Almé Z, the father of Jalisco B, is his most famous son.

Ibrahim (1952–1973)
Noblesse de la Cour (1957)	Orientale (1960)	Quitance (1960)	Quastor (1960–1980)	Tanael (1963–1981)	Ukase (1964)	Almé (1966–1991)	Adagio (1966)	Belle sartillaise (1967)	Camarade Rapide (1968–1987)	Cor de chasse (1968–1981)	Danaïde (1969)	D'Où viens-tu (1969–1988)	Double Espoir (1969–1994)	Elf III (1970–1991)	Fleuri du Manoir (1971)

The quality of his offspring was particularly noted during the grand week at Fontainebleau in 1970, where Alcazar D, Aurore C, Azimut, Arteban, and Almé all dominated other competitors in the final, while the five-year-old mare Val de Loire B won the competition in her age class. A successful cross was Ibrahim with the daughters of Ultimate, a Thoroughbred. Ibrahim still has a great influence on the current breeding of sport horses.
