= Nasrullah (horse) =

Irish-bred Thoroughbred racehorse

- Nasrullah's grave at Claiborne Farm
- Sire: Nearco
- Grandsire: Pharos
- Dam: Mumtaz Begum
- Damsire: Blenheim
- Sex: Stallion
- Foaled: March 2, 1940
- Died: May 26, 1959 (aged 19)
- Country: Ireland
- Colour: Bay
- Breeder: Aga Khan III
- Owner: Aga Khan III
- Trainer: Frank Butters
- Record: 10: 5-1-2
- Earnings: $15,217

Major wins
- Coventry Stakes (1942); Champion Stakes (1943)

Awards
- Top-rated British two-year-old colt (1942); Leading sire in GB & Ireland (1951); Leading sire in North America (1955, 1956, 1959, 1960, 1962)
- Last updated on 15 July 2025

Nasrullah (2 March 1940 – 26 May 1959) was a Thoroughbred racehorse bred in Ireland and trained in England. He later became a champion sire in both Europe and North America. As a two-year-old, he won the Coventry Stakes and finished second in the Middle Park Stakes, ending the year as the top-rated colt of his generation. In the following season, he became increasingly difficult to manage and his temperament compromised his racing career. He was the beaten favourite in the 2,000 Guineas and finished a close third in the Derby Stakes before winning the Champion Stakes. As a breeding stallion he stood in England, Ireland and the United States and had great success in each location.

== Background ==
Nasrullah was a large bay horse with a white star, bred in Ireland by his owner the Aga Khan. He was sired by Nearco, an undefeated Italian racehorse that became one of the most important stallions of the 20th century. Apart from numerous major winners, he sired the influential stallions Nearctic and Royal Charger. His dam, Mumtaz Begum, was a daughter of the outstanding racehorse and broodmare Mumtaz Mahal and became an influential broodmare in her own right: her other descendants have included Royal Charger, Habibti, Octagonal, Oh So Sharp, and Risen Star.

The Aga Khan sent Nasrullah into training with Frank Butters at his Fitzroy House stable in Newmarket. Because of the restrictions imposed as a result of the Second World War, many British races were adapted both in distance and venue and Nasrullah's entire racing career was confined to Newmarket Racecourse.

== Racing career ==
=== 1942: two-year-old season ===
On his racecourse debut, Nasrullah finished third in the Wilburton Stakes, but was then moved up in class and contested the Coventry Stakes (usually run at Royal Ascot) on 12 June. Ridden by the champion jockey Gordon Richards, he won at odds of 7/4, beating the future Derby winner Straight Deal. In July, he won the Great Bradley Stakes, beating a single opponent.

Nasrullah was then rested until the autumn, when he ran in Britain's then most prestigious race for two-year-olds, the six-furlong Middle Park Stakes. In a closely run contest, he finished second, beaten a neck by the filly Ribbon.

In the Free Handicap, a rating of the season's best two-year-olds, Nasrullah was given a weight of 136 lb, making him the top-rated colt, a pound behind the filly Lady Sybil.

=== 1943: three-year-old season ===
Before the start of the 1943 season, bookmakers offered prices for the season's leading races despite wartime restrictions and Nasrullah was made the early favourite for the Derby ahead of his stable companion Umiddad. On his first appearance as a three-year-old, Nasrullah won the Chatteris Stakes easily, but his conduct before the race caused concern. He was extremely unwilling to leave the pre-race paddock and gave Richards several problems on the way to the start. On his next appearance, he was fitted with blinkers when he was started 13/8 favourite for the 2,000 Guineas. Despite his headgear, he was again reluctant to go down to the start and, after leading for five furlongs, faded to finish fourth of the 19 runners behind the outsider Kingsway.

The "New" Derby of 1943 was run over Newmarket's July course and Nasrullah started at odds of 9/1 in a field of 23 runners. Richards, who had the choice of several rides, elected to ride Nasrullah despite his bad behaviour and that he had been labeled a "rogue". Richards struggled to keep the colt on a straight course, but eventually succeeded and Nasrullah looked the likely winner when he took the lead in the last quarter mile. In the closing stages, however, he was overtaken and finished third to Straight Deal and Umiddad. In August, Nasrullah went some way towards restoring his reputation when he won the Cavenham Stakes, although Richards had to "persuade" the colt to keep going when he began to idle after taking the lead.

In autumn, Nasrullah was disappointing in the "New St Leger" over 14 furlongs, in which he finished sixth of the 12 runners behind the filly Herringbone. On his final appearance of the year, Nasrullah showed his best form as he won the ten-furlong Champion Stakes from Kingsway and Umiddad in what was described as "the smoothest race of his career".

== Stud record ==
=== European record ===
In 1944, he was purchased by the bloodstock agent Bertie Kerr. Kerr kept him for three weeks before selling him for 19,000 guineas to Joseph McGrath, who subsequently stabled him at the Brownstown Stud in County Kildare. This deal was allegedly done over an afternoon cup of tea at Bewley's in Westmoreland Street. Nasrullah was an immediate success as a breeding stallion and in his six seasons his fee rose from 198 guineas to 500 guineas. He was champion sire in 1951. The best of his European progeny included:

- Nathoo (grey colt, foaled in 1945), winner of the Irish Derby
- Noor (brown colt, 1945), Santa Anita Handicap, Hollywood Gold Cup
- Musidora (bay filly, 1946), 1000 Guineas, Oaks Stakes
- Belle of All (bay filly, 1948), Cheveley Park Stakes, 1000 Guineas, Coronation Stakes
- Nearula (bay colt, 1950), Middle Park Stakes, 2000 Guineas, Champion Stakes
- Never Say Die (chestnut colt, 1951), Derby, St Leger

=== North American record ===
In 1950, Nasrullah was sold for $370,000 to Arthur B. Hancock, Jr. He was exported to stand at stud in the United States at Hancock's Claiborne Farm in Paris, Kentucky. Nasrullah became one of the most important North American sires of the 20th century, leading the sire list five times. Among his American progeny were:

- Jaipur (brown colt, 1959), Belmont Stakes
- Bold Ruler (brown colt, 1954), Preakness Stakes, eight times champion sire, sire of Triple Crown winner Secretariat
- Red God (chestnut colt, 1954), sire of Blushing Groom
- Bald Eagle (bay colt, 1955), Washington D.C. International
- Nashua (bay colt, 1952), Preakness Stakes, Belmont Stakes
- Nasram (bay colt, 1960), King George VI and Queen Elizabeth Stakes
- Never Bend (bay colt, 1960), sire of Mill Reef

Nasrullah died on 26 May 1959. He is buried at Claiborne Farm.

== Pedigree ==
Pedigree of Nasrullah
Sire Nearco dkb/br. 1935	Pharos b. 1920	Phalaris b. 1913	Polymelus
Sire Nearco dkb/br. 1935	Pharos b. 1920	Phalaris b. 1913	Bromus
Sire Nearco dkb/br. 1935	Pharos b. 1920	Scapa Flow ch. 1914	Chaucer
Sire Nearco dkb/br. 1935	Pharos b. 1920	Scapa Flow ch. 1914	Anchora
Sire Nearco dkb/br. 1935	Nogara b. 1928	Havresac dkb/br. 1915	Rabelais
Sire Nearco dkb/br. 1935	Nogara b. 1928	Havresac dkb/br. 1915	Hors Concours
Sire Nearco dkb/br. 1935	Nogara b. 1928	Catnip b. 1910	Spearmint
Sire Nearco dkb/br. 1935	Nogara b. 1928	Catnip b. 1910	Sibola
Dam Mumtaz Begum gr. 1932	Blenheim b. 1927	Blandford br. 1919	Swynford
Dam Mumtaz Begum gr. 1932	Blenheim b. 1927	Blandford br. 1919	Blanche
Dam Mumtaz Begum gr. 1932	Blenheim b. 1927	Malva b. 1919	Charles O'Malley
Dam Mumtaz Begum gr. 1932	Blenheim b. 1927	Malva b. 1919	Wild Arum
Dam Mumtaz Begum gr. 1932	Mumtaz Mahal gr. 1921	The Tetrarch gr. 1911	Roi Herode
Dam Mumtaz Begum gr. 1932	Mumtaz Mahal gr. 1921	The Tetrarch gr. 1911	Vahren
Dam Mumtaz Begum gr. 1932	Mumtaz Mahal gr. 1921	Lady Josephine ch. 1912	Sundridge
Dam Mumtaz Begum gr. 1932	Mumtaz Mahal gr. 1921	Lady Josephine ch. 1912	Americus Girl (Family: 9-c)

== See also ==
- List of racehorses
- Otello du Soleil
