= Orange Peel (horse) =

Thoroughbred sire of sporthorses

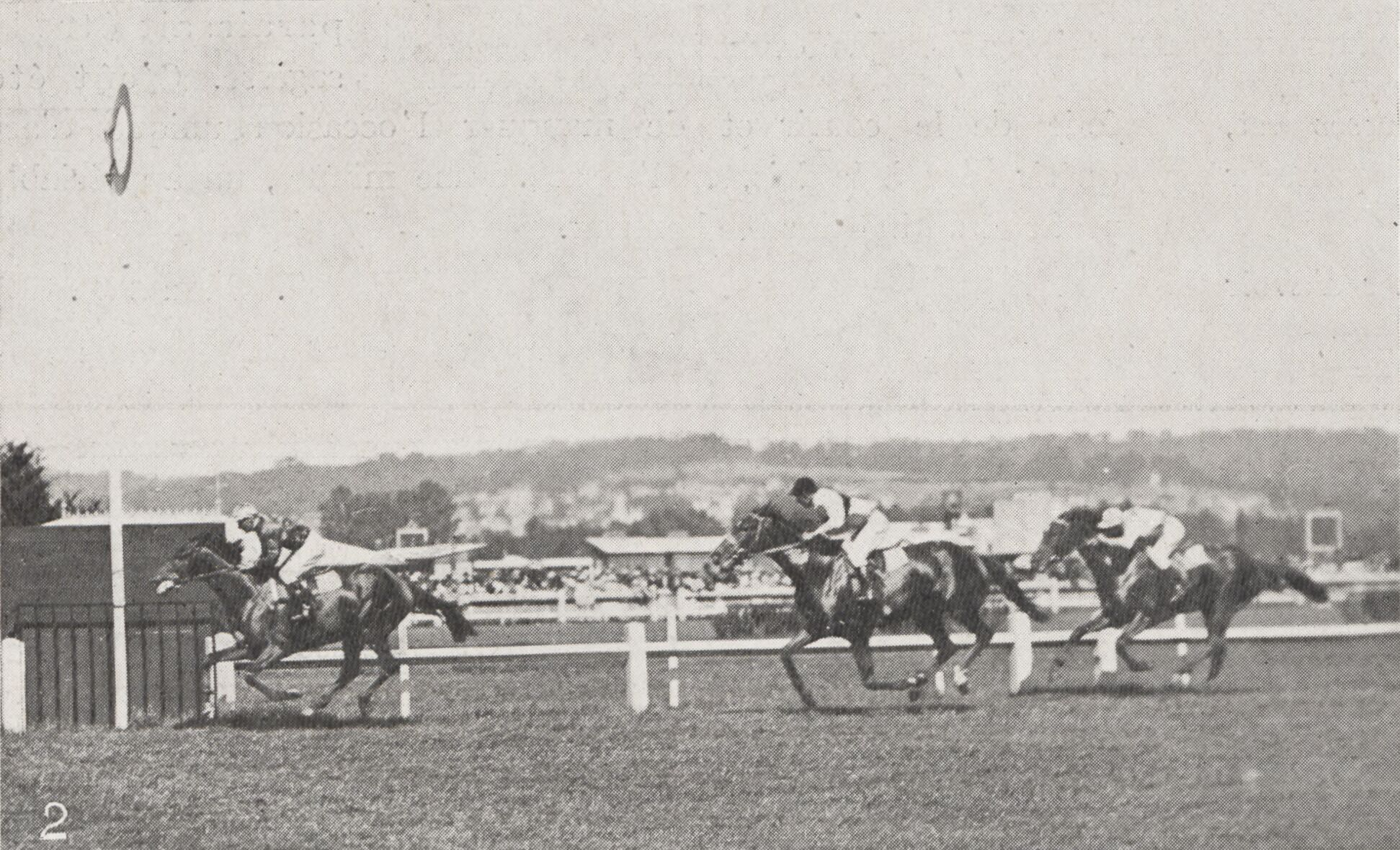
- The 1923 Prix Maurice de Gheest. Orange Peel finished second, two lengths behind Grillemont.
- Breed: Thoroughbred
- Sire: Jus d'Orange
- Grandsire: St Just
- Dam: Rirette
- Maternal grandsire: Ajax
- Sex: Stallion
- Foaled: 1919
- Colour: Bay, half pastern left fore, sock left hind, stripe

Orange Peel (foaled 1919) was a Thoroughbred stallion that had a significant influence on the breeding of sport horses.

Orange Peel has had a great influence on the breeding of show jumpers. Orange Peel sired 19 sons from 1924 to 1940, and his descendants are very successful today, with 26 of the top 100 show jumping sires of 1990 having him in their pedigree.

One of Orange Peel's greatest descendants was his grandson, the Anglo-Norman Ibrahim, who produced such great sires as Quastor (1960) and Almé Z (1966). Sons of Orange Peel include The Last Orange, the sire of Ibrahim, Jus de Pomme, and Plein d'Espoirs.

== Sire line tree ==
Sire line descendant tree
- Orange Peel
  - Jus de Pomme
  - Plein d'Espoirs
    - Olifant
      - Allegro
  - The Last Orange
    - Ibrahim
      - Petit Prince C
      - Quastor
        - Fair Play III
        - Lieu de Rampan
      - Taneal
      - Ukase
      - Val de Loire B
      - Adagio
      - Alcazar D
      - Almé Z
        - Galoubet A
        - I Love You
        - Jalisco B
        - Jalme des Musnuls
        - Joyau d'Or A
        - Alexis Z
        - Lord Gordon
        - Aerobic
        - Ahorn Z
        - Aloubé Z
        - Athlet Z
        - Vico
        - Almeo
        - Aladin Z
        - Animo
        - Artos Z
        - Ilmeo
      - Arteban
      - Cor de Chasse
      - Double Espoir
        - Lisou Blinois
        - Valespoir Malabry
        - Apache d'Adriers
        - Avec Espoir
        - Bayard d'Elle
        - Bey de Sèvres
        - Flipper d'Elle
      - Kibrahim (Digne Espoir)
      - Elf III
      - Espoir
      - Fleuri du Manoir
      - Gibramino
      - Hedjaz

== Pedigree ==
Pedigree of Orange Peel, bay horse, 1919
Sire Jus d'Orange 1912	St Just; 1907	St Frusquin	St Simon
Sire Jus d'Orange 1912	St Just; 1907	St Frusquin	Isabel
Sire Jus d'Orange 1912	St Just; 1907	Justitia	Le Sancy
Sire Jus d'Orange 1912	St Just; 1907	Justitia	The Frisky Matron
Sire Jus d'Orange 1912	Orange Queen; 1904	Martagon	Bend Or
Sire Jus d'Orange 1912	Orange Queen; 1904	Martagon	Tiger Lilly
Sire Jus d'Orange 1912	Orange Queen; 1904	Model Queen	Lord Lorne*
Sire Jus d'Orange 1912	Orange Queen; 1904	Model Queen	The Empress Maud
Dam Rirette 1913	Ajax; 1901	Flying Fox	Orme
Dam Rirette 1913	Ajax; 1901	Flying Fox	Vampire
Dam Rirette 1913	Ajax; 1901	Amie	Clamart
Dam Rirette 1913	Ajax; 1901	Amie	Alice
Dam Rirette 1913	Golden Key; 1901	Ladas	Hampton*
Dam Rirette 1913	Golden Key; 1901	Ladas	Illuminata
Dam Rirette 1913	Golden Key; 1901	Lock And Key	Janissary
Dam Rirette 1913	Golden Key; 1901	Lock And Key	Seclusion

* Orange Peel is inbred 5S x 4D to the stallion Hampton, meaning that he appears fifth generation (via Lord Lorne) on the sire side of his pedigree and fourth generation on the dam side of his pedigree.
