= Helios de la Cour II =

French showjumping stallion (1995 to 2019)

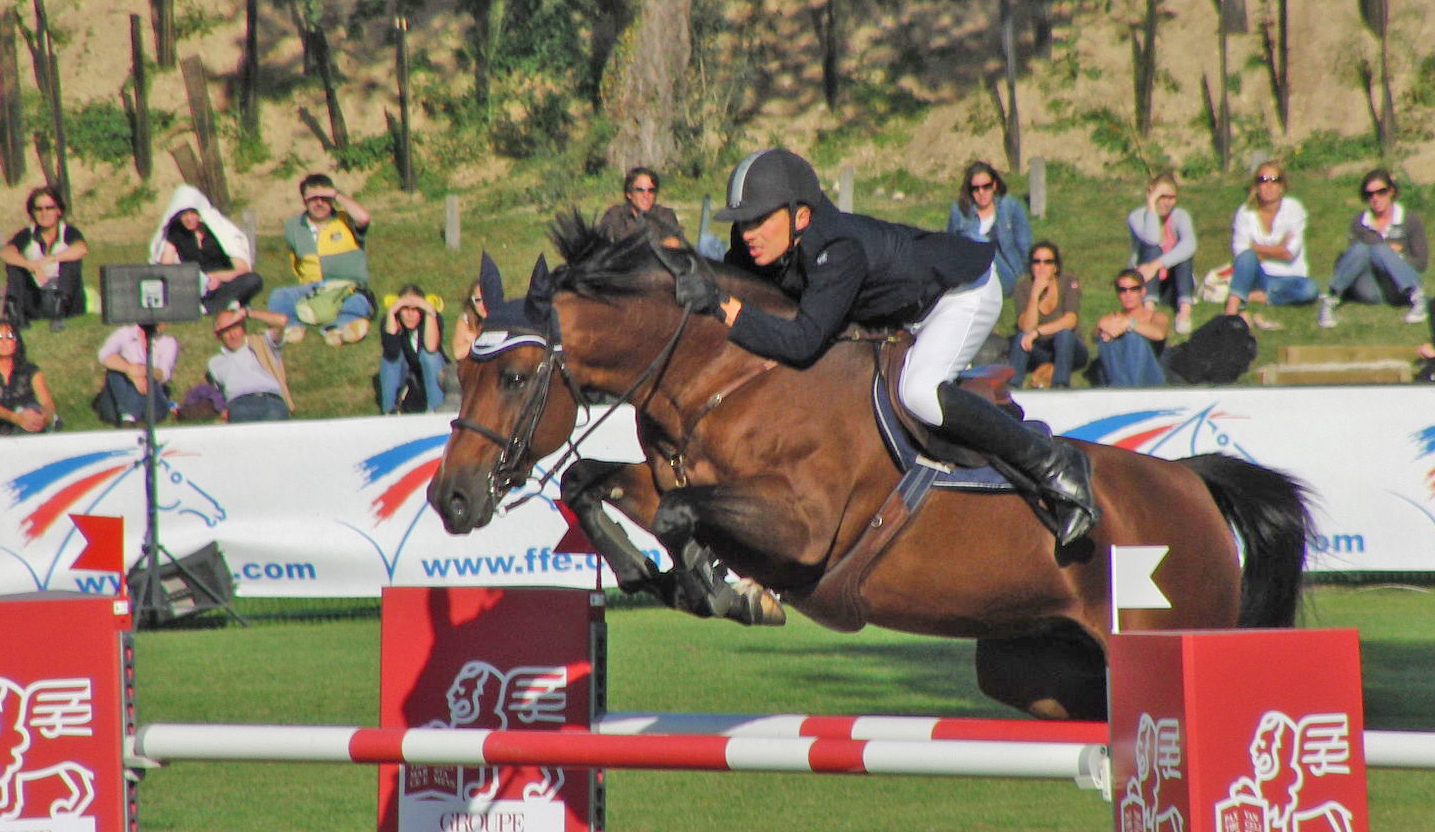
- Helios de la Cour II ridden by Alexis Gautier at the 2010 French Elite Show Jumping Championships.
- Species: Horse
- Breed: Selle Français
- Born: May 29, 1995; Moyon
- Died: July 19, 2019
- Cause of death: Horse colic
- Parents: Papillon Rouge (father); Sisi de la Cour (mother)
- Offspring: Pêche du Heup; Parenthèse Tame; Pommeau du Heup; Par trois Quassiopée de Tivoli; Qui Vive de la Tour; Quabelle; Quinette du Quesnoy; Quenelle de Normandie; Qadillac du Heup; Urhelia Lutterbach

Helios de la Cour II (29 May 1995, Moyon – 19 July 2019) was a bay stallion registered in the Selle Français studbook. He was owned throughout his career by his breeders, Emmanuelle and Jean-François Couetil. After a serious accident in 2006 that interrupted his sporting career for several years, he achieved a notable distinction by becoming, with rider Alexis Gautier, the first horse in show jumping history to win the French championship twice, in 2010 and 2011.

After establishing himself as a prominent breeding stallion, he died of colic in July 2019. He sired more than 700 foals, including the champion mares Qui vive de la Tour and Urhelia Lutterbach.

== History ==
Helios de la Cour II was born on 29 May 1995 at the Haras de la Patoyère in Moyon, in the Manche department of Normandy, France, to Michel and Colette Couetil. He remained under the ownership of his breeders throughout his life, who gave priority to his breeding career over his sporting career.

He was ridden exclusively by the rider Alexis Gautier. In 2006, he suffered a serious paddock accident that resulted in a torn kneecap, which led to his withdrawal from competition for three years. He returned to show jumping in 2009 and subsequently achieved, with Gautier, the first double victory in the history of the French Pro Élite Championship.

By the end of 2010, Helios was approaching the age of 16, which is considered advanced for a show-jumping horse. His last recorded competition was a three-star international show jumping event (CSI3*) held in Royan on 2 August 2012. He was officially retired from competition in 2013. Helios died of sudden colic on 19 July 2019 at the home of his breeders, Emmanuelle and Jean-François Couetil, at the age of 24. Following his death, his breeders expressed their sorrow at the loss of a horse regarded as the most accomplished they had owned.

== Description ==
Helios de la Cour II was a bay stallion registered in the Selle Français studbook, classified as a "Selle Français originel," meaning that he had no crossbreeding with horses of other origins.

He displayed the morphological type of his sire, the stallion Papillon Rouge, with a square and expressive head, a stocky build, strong leg action, and temperament, but sometimes an excessively low balance over fences. He stood 1.67 meters tall.

== Competition record ==
In 1998, Helios de la Cour II was crowned French champion in the three-year-old show-jumping category. In 2001, the pair formed by Helios and rider Alexis Gautier finished sixth in the national championship for six-year-old horses.

=== 2010 season ===
In March 2010, ridden by Alexis Gautier, he won the Grand Prix of the Auvers show-jumping competition in the Pro 2 category with a faultless round. The pair were considered strong contenders for the 2010 French Show Jumping Championship. Gautier competed using a wild card, as the horse was not qualified for the championship. After leading the speed class, the pair completed a clear round on the following day.

In November 2010, the Helios–Gautier pair were among the headline participants at the Équipondi competition in Pontivy. They won the Pro Élite Grand Prix at 1.50 m after completing a double clear round in 45.47 seconds, placing pressure on their rivals with their performance.

=== 2011 season ===
During the 2011 French Championship, the Helios–Gautier pair finished second after the Saturday speed class and subsequently placed first on Sunday over the two rounds of the Pro Élite Championship, ahead of Patrice Delaveau (Ornella Mail), Philippe Rozier (Randgraaf), and Michel Hécart (Ninon des Loulous). The pair completed a faultless round, receiving a half-point penalty for exceeding the time allowed.

In 2011, Helios achieved a show-jumping index (ISO) of 172, which remained his highest sporting year.

== Origins ==
Helios de la Cour II was sired by the Selle Français stallion Papillon Rouge, out of the mare Sisi de la Cour, a daughter of Uriel. His pedigree included 33% Thoroughbred ancestry.

Family tree

Helios de la Cour II; 1995—2019
Papillon Rouge; 1981—2009	Sisi de la Cour; 1984—2010
Jalisco B 1975—1994	Verboise °1965	Uriel; 1964—1988	Lady de la Cour °1977
Almé; 1966—1991	Tanagra °1963	Centaure du Bois °1946	Lorette °1955	Nankin °1957	Jesabelle de Baugy °1953	Starter °1962	Up Lady °1964
Ibrahim; 1952—1973	Girondine °1950	Furioso; 1939—1967	Délicieuse °1947	Trianon du Bois °1941	Quiryda °1938	Fringant °1949	Histoire de rire °1951	Fra Diavolo; 1938—1959	Constellation °1946	Ascot °1944	Nadine °1935	Rantzau; 1946—1971	Kaironnaise °1954	Ascot °1944	Noblesse de la Cour °1957

His major ancestor was the stallion Ibrahim.

== Progeny ==
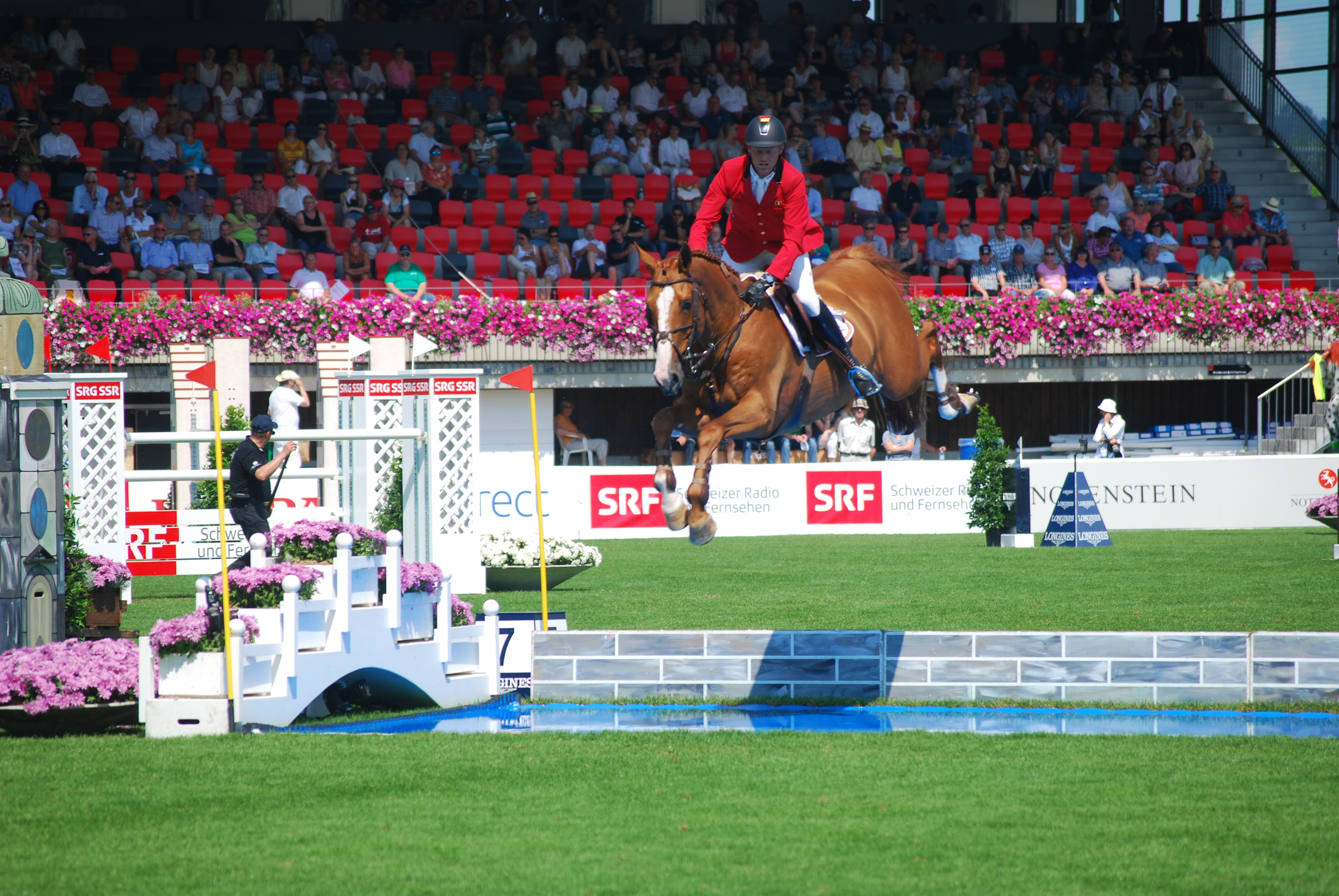
Pommeau du Heup, one of the sons of Helios de la Cour II.

Helios de la Cour II was approved for breeding in the Selle Français studbook in 2000. According to Lucas Tracol in Grand Prix magazine, he had a significant impact on French breeding, siring 708 foals. In L'Éperon, Éric Fournier described his success as a sire as limited, noting that his offspring were considered relatively heavy for show-jumping horses.

Family tree

Helios de la Cour II; 1995 — 2019
Par trois °2003	Pommeau du Heup °2003	Pêche du Heup °2003	Parenthèse Tame; 2003 — 2020	Qui vive de la Tour °2004	Quassiopée de Tivoli °2004	Quinette du Quesnoy °2004	Quenelle de Normandie °2004	Qadillac du Heup °2004	Quabelle °2004	Urhelia Lutterbach °2008
Unstin du pays d'Auge °2008	Conga van de Neerheide °2008	Unick du Francport °2008	Up and down Tame °2008	Uneven Sunheup °2008	Utopista °2008
Mandato van de Neerheide °2012	Guernica la Garette; 2016

Helios sired several notable horses, including the mare Qui vive de la Tour (ISO 161), as well as Urhelia Lutterbach, Pommeau du Heup and her sister Qadillac du Heup, Par Trois, Noa de la Chaise, Parenthese Tame, Quabelle, Quenelle de Normandie, Quassiope de Tivoli, Quinette du Quesnoy, and Rye Val de Mai.

== See also ==
- Moyon
- Stallion
- Breed registry
- Show jumping

== Bibliography ==
- Decamp, Jennifer (2010). "Alexis Gautier et Hélios de la Cour, champions de France" [Alexis Gautier and Hélios de la Cour, French champions]. Grand Prix Magazine (in French).
- Fournier, Éric (2019). "Helios de la Cour, disparition d'un grand champion" [Helios de la Cour, passing of a great champion]. L'Éperon (in French). Archived from the original on August 20, 2019.
- Thierry, M.-A (2011). "Master Pro : Alexis Gautier et Helios de la Cour, épisode II" [Master Pro: Alexis Gautier and Helios de la Cour, episode II]. Grand Prix Magazine (in French).
- Tracol, Lucas (2019). "Hélios de la Cour foudroyé par une colique" [Helios de la Cour struck down by colic]. Grand Prix Magazine (in French). Archived from the original on September 18, 2019.
