= Pégase du Mûrier =

French show jumping stallion

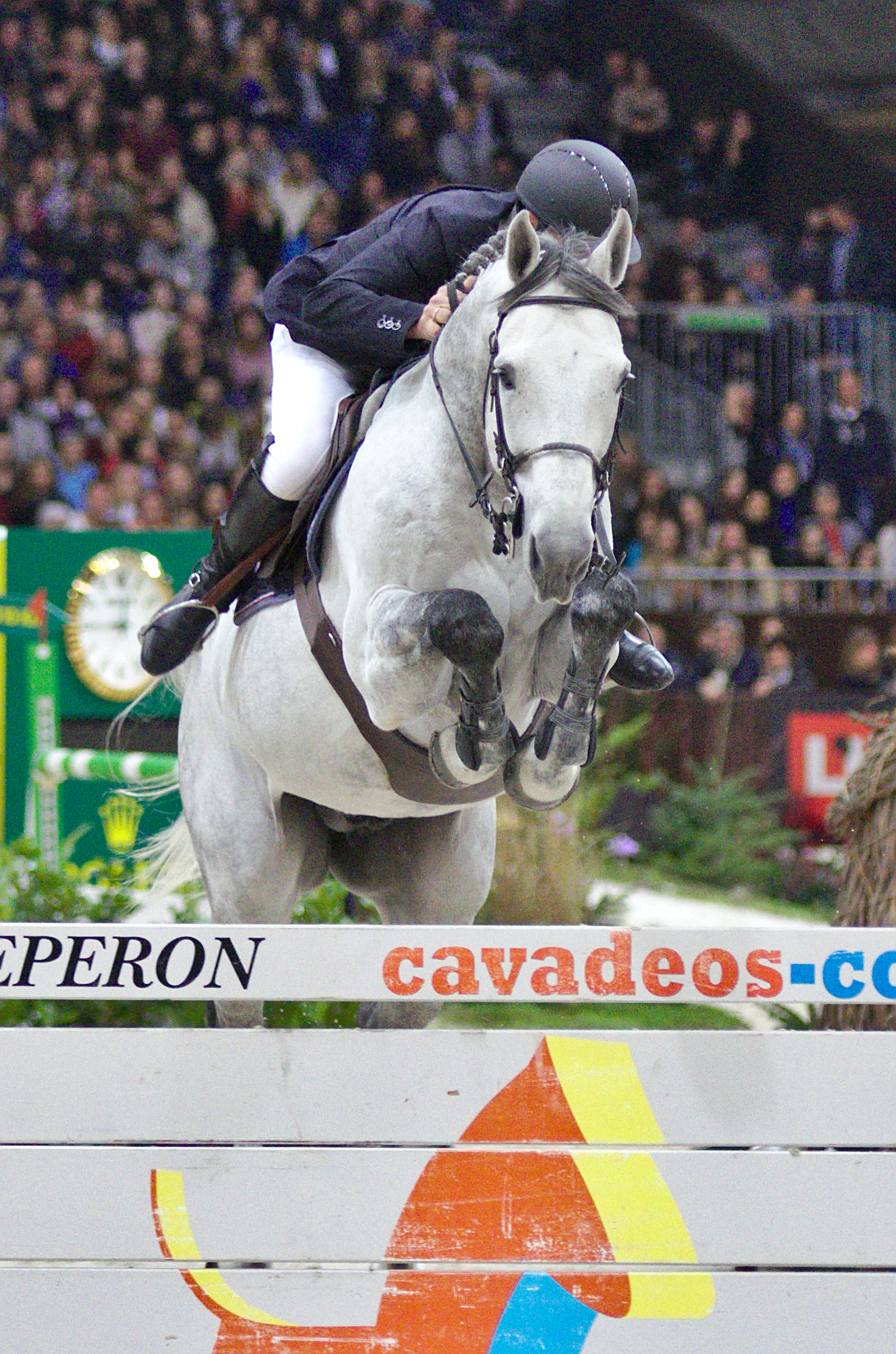
- Pégase du Mûrier ridden by Roger-Yves Bost during the Prix Crédit Suisse (1.50 m) in Geneva, December 13, 2014.
- Breed: Selle Français
- Sire: Adelfos
- Dam: Folamour du Mûrier
- Sex: Male
- Foaled: Andouillé
- Color: Gray

Pégase du Mûrier (born April 29, 2003) is a gray show jumping stallion registered in the Selle Français studbook. Purchased at the Fences sales by a jeweler, he successfully completed the classic cycle of young French show jumping horses, before being entrusted at the age of 7 to a little-known rider, Sébastien Duplant, with whom he won the title of vice-champion of France Pro Élite in 2014. That same year, he was snapped up by international rider Roger-Yves Bost, who went on to win numerous Grand Prix titles, particularly in 2017. Retired at the end of 2018, Pégase du Mûrier is now devoted to breeding at the Saint-Lô stud farm.

== History ==
Pégase du Mûrier was born on April 29, 2003, at the Mûrier stud run by Philippe Bodinier, in Andouillé, Mayenne, France. At six months old, he was purchased at the Fences weaning sales by jeweler Raynal Gras, a businessman who owned four jewelry stores and bought horses for his own pleasure. He follows the classic show jumping cycle from age 4 to 6, reaching the finals of the 4-year-old show jumping competition with an Elite mention. He also qualified for the 5- and 6-year-old finals. He is ridden by Nicolas Belin, who encounters difficulties due to the delicate nature of the animal. He was also ridden briefly by rider Lysa Doerr in August 2011.

=== With Sébastien Duplant ===
Most of his career as a sport horse was spent with a little-known young rider, Sébastien Duplant. This young rider took Pégase from Reynald Gras's stables in Aix-en-Provence at the age of 7, when he was suffering from tendonitis and hadn't jumped for a year, following a series of bad experiences. At first, the stallion was not very trusting and didn't open up. Sébastien Duplant took part in national show jumping competitions every weekend, before progressing to the 2 and 3 star international show jumping competitions (CSI2* and CSI3*). Noting that Pégase du Mûrier was the best horse in his stable, Duplant worked on him for a long time. This gray stallion enabled the previously little-known Sébastien Duplant to "move from the shadows into the light", forming one of the most talked-about French rider-horse pairs of the 2013 and 2014 seasons. The pair won the Grand Prix 3 étoiles (CSI3*) de la ville de Vichy in July. Highly gifted, Pégase du Mûrier garnered a great deal of praise, particularly after the 2014 French Pro Elite runner-up title, which was a surprise, if not a revelation, on the French show jumping circuit in 2014, as it was the couple's first appearance at this level of competition. The gold medal eluded Sébastien Duplant due to a fault in the first round. His horse nevertheless attracted the attention of various investors.

=== With Roger-Yves Bost ===
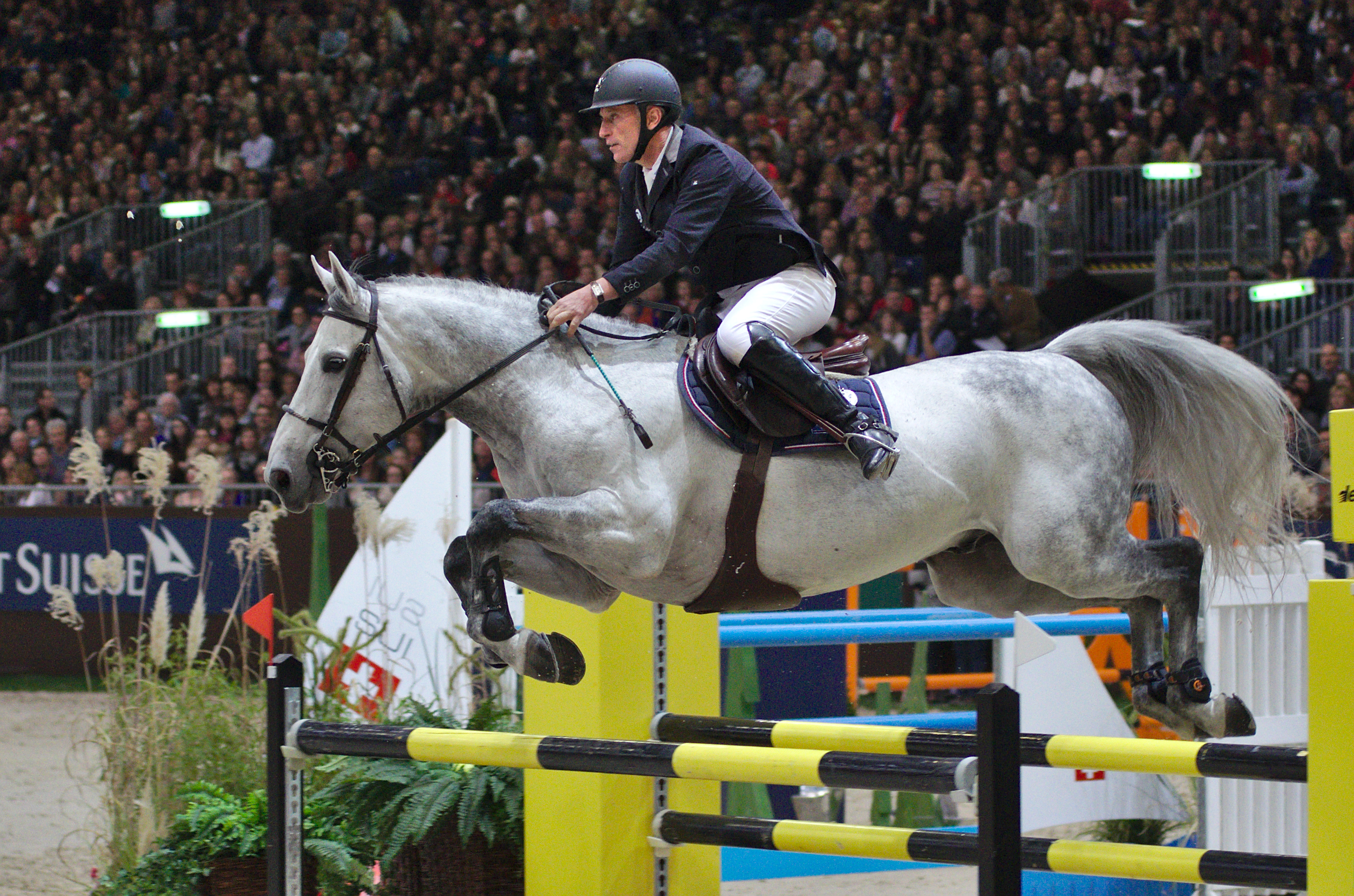
Roger-Yves Bost riding Pégase du Mûrier during the Prix Crédit Suisse in Geneva, December 13, 2014.

In October 2014, when Pégase du Mûrier was 11 years old, international rider Roger-Yves Bost took him back to his stables, to reconstitute his stable of horses following the retirement of Myrtille Paulois. He acquired Pegasus with the help of his French-Canadian sponsor Equiblue, who holds 99% of the shares, the remaining 1% being owned by his EURL Bosty Jump.

The pair compete in their first major event at the CSI5*-W (World cup stage) in Verona.

Between 2014 and 2018, Roger-Yves Bost and Pégase du Mûrier scored eight international victories in Aachen, Paris, Shanghai, Stuttgart, Bordeaux, Geneva and Madrid. Despite a dip in form between September and November 2015, the pair won €600,000 in prize money. Pégase du Mûrier disappeared from the show ring between February (Hong Kong Grand Prix) and June 2018, making his comeback at the Grand National de Montfort-sur-Meu.

His last international competition was the Global Champions Tour event at Chantilly in summer 2018. Pégase du Mûrier is experiencing health problems, which are likely to have been the reason for his retirement announcement in November 2018.

== Description ==
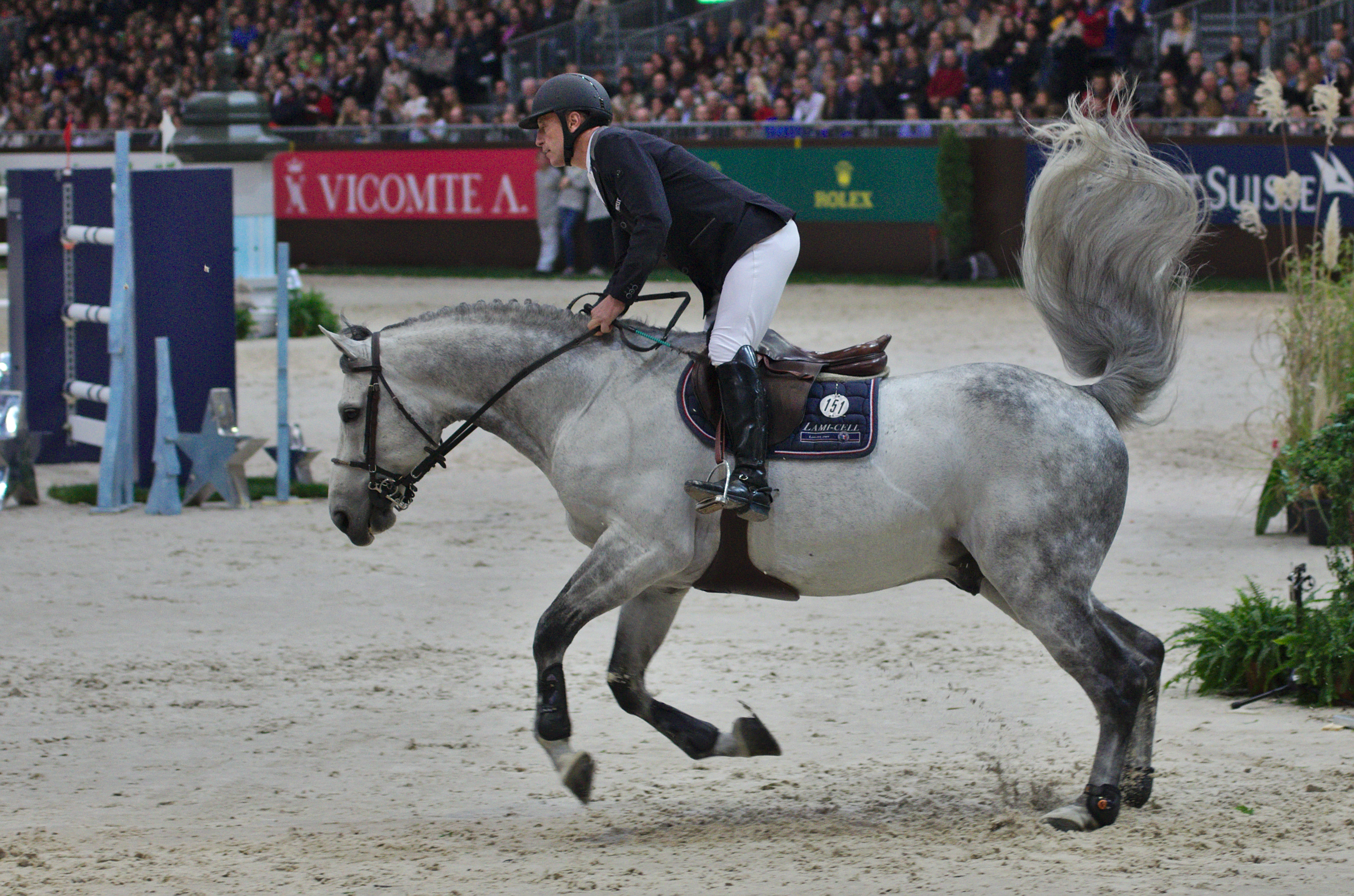
Roger-Yves Bost riding Pégase du Mûrier during the Prix Crédit Suisse in Geneva, December 13, 2014.

Pégase du Mûrier is a gray-colored stallion registered in the Selle Français studbook. He stands 1.72 m tall. Expressive and generous over jumps, he combines power, respect and speed. Roger-Yves Bost describes him as a very sensitive stallion, close to man, with a strong character on the track, sometimes uncooperative. Indeed, he has a strong character, and a tendency to prick himself on right-hand recoveries. Nevertheless, Bost considers him one of the best horses he's ever had. He describes him as a very generous and competitive horse, very gentle, an overachiever for whom the risk would be to ask too much.

Sébastien Duplant describes him as a beautiful, demonstrative horse, particularly endearing, who "needs to form a couple with his rider"; he also refers to Pegasus as "the horse of his life". In training, he does little jumping, and only on bars less than a meter high; he works a lot on the flat with neck extensions, to relax him.

== Results ==
Pégase du Mûrier has shown great consistency in his performances.

=== In 2012 ===
- October 11, 2012: Grand Prix winner at the CSI2* d'Aix-Meyreuil, at 1.45 m
- November 20, 2012: Winner of the Grand Prix of the CSI2* in Vidauban, at 1.45 m

=== In 2013 ===
- June 23, 2013: 4th in the CSI2* Fontainebleau Grand Prix, at 1.45 m
- August 4, 2013: 5th in the Grand Prix of the CSI2* Sainte-Cécile (Aix-Meyreuil), at 1.45 m

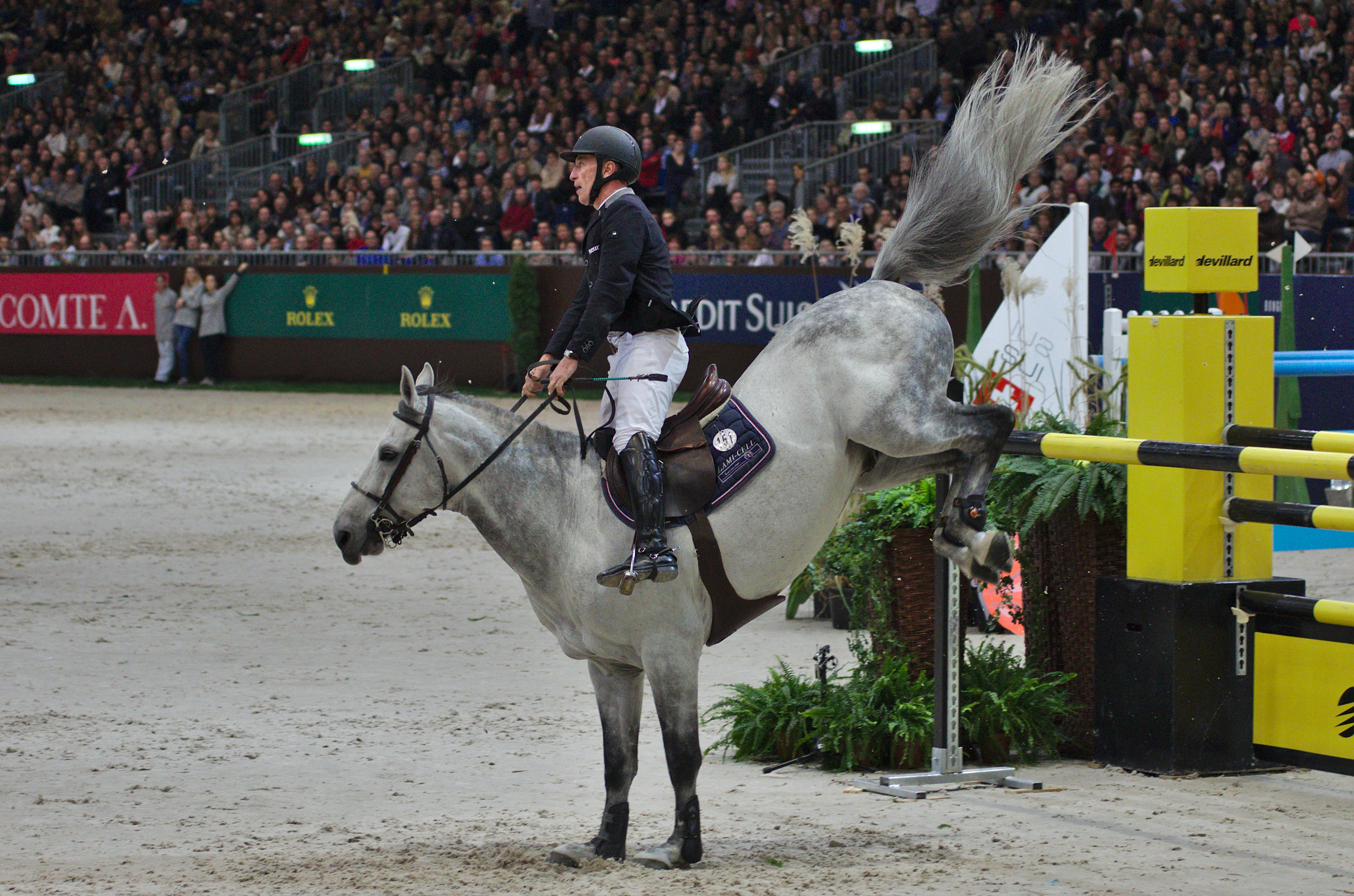
Roger-Yves Bost riding Pégase du Mûrier during the Prix Crédit Suisse in Geneva, December 13, 2014.

=== In 2014 ===
- April 6, 2014: Winner of the Grand Prix of the CSI2* de Cagnes-sur-Mer, at 1.45 m
- June 29, 2014: Winner of the CSI2* Grenoble-Jarrie Grand Prix, at 1.45 m
- July 13, 2014: Winner of the Grand Prix at the CSI3* in Vichy, at 1.50 m
- Silver medal at the Pro Élite French Championship in Fontainebleau
- September 7, 2014: Winner of the CSI2* in Chazey-sur-Ain, at 1.45 m (with Sébastien Duplant)
- December 13, 2014: 4th in the Prix Crédit Suisse in Geneva, at 1.50 m (with Roger-Yves Bost)

=== In 2015 ===
- February 8, 2015: 10th in the CSI5*-W Grand Prix at Jumping International de Bordeaux, at 1.60 m
- May 30, 2015: 7th in the CSI5* Aachen, at 1.55 m
- June 19, 2015: Second in the Rotterdam CSIO5*, at 1.60 m
- November 27, 2015: 23rd in the CSI5*-W in Madrid, at 1.50 m, after a first place in qualifying at 1.45 m

=== In 2016 ===
- February 7, 2016: 10th in the Grand Prix at Jumping International de Bordeaux, at 1.60 m
- July 3, 2016: Winner of the Global Champions Tour stage in Paris, at 1.50 m – 1.50 m
- July 16, 2016: Winner of the Preis der AachenMünchener at the CSIO5* in Aachen, at 1.55 m
- August 28, 2016: Winner of the CSI4* in Valencia, at 1.50 m
- October 2, 2016: 4th in the CSI5* Grand Prix in Los Angeles, at 1.60 m
- October 30, 2016: 9th of the Lyon World cup stage, at 1.40 m-1.60 m

=== In 2017 ===
Pégase du Mûrier achieved a Show Jumping Index (ISO) of 176 over 2017.

- February 12, 2017: 7th in the Hong Kong Grand Prix, CSI5* LMS, at 1.60 m
- March 11, 2017: Second in the Prix Hermès Sellier, CSI5*, in Paris, at 1.50 m
- March 18, 2017: 4th in the Prix du 24 Faubourg, CSI5*, in Paris, at 1.55 m
- April 29, 2017: Winner of the Global Champions Tour stage in Shanghai, at 1.55 m – 1.60 m
- June 10, 2017: Runner-up in the Cannes Global Champions Tour stage, at 1.55 m – 1.60 m
- June 24, 2017: Winner of the Monte Carlo Global Champions Tour stage, at 1.55 m – 1.60 m
- September 23, 2017: 3rd in the Global Champions Tour stage in Rome, at 1.55 m – 1.60 m

== Origins ==
Pégase du Mûrier is a son of the Holsteiner stallion Adelfos (ISO 173) and the Selle Français mare Folamour du Mûrier, by Le Tot de Semilly. The latter's dam, Karielle (ISO 136), is the flagship mare of the du Mûrier breeding operation, and dam of the stallion Dollar du Mûrier. Pegasus is secondarily descended from the famous mare Camarade Rapide, one of the pillars of French Saddlebred breeding.

Pedigree of Pégase du Mûrier (2003)
Sire Adelfos (1983–2009)	Athlet Z (1979–2005)	Almé Z (1966–1991)	Ibrahim (1952–1973)*
Sire Adelfos (1983–2009)	Athlet Z (1979–2005)	Almé Z (1966–1991)	Girondine (1950)
Sire Adelfos (1983–2009)	Athlet Z (1979–2005)	Golfamt (1968)	Gotthard (1949)
Sire Adelfos (1983–2009)	Athlet Z (1979–2005)	Golfamt (1968)	Erlenfee (1961)
Sire Adelfos (1983–2009)	Condina (1979)	Caletto (1975–1999)	Cor de la Bryère (1968–2000)
Sire Adelfos (1983–2009)	Condina (1979)	Caletto (1975–1999)	Deka (1967)
Sire Adelfos (1983–2009)	Condina (1979)	Michaela (1974)	Romanow (1969)
Sire Adelfos (1983–2009)	Condina (1979)	Michaela (1974)	Marita (1967)
Dam Folamour du Mûrier (1993)	Le Tot de Semilly (1977–2008)	Grand Veneur (1972–1988)	Amour du Bois (1966–1979)
Dam Folamour du Mûrier (1993)	Le Tot de Semilly (1977–2008)	Grand Veneur (1972–1988)	Tanagra (1963)
Dam Folamour du Mûrier (1993)	Le Tot de Semilly (1977–2008)	Venue du Tot (1965)	Juriste (1953)
Dam Folamour du Mûrier (1993)	Le Tot de Semilly (1977–2008)	Venue du Tot (1965)	Relique (1961)
Dam Folamour du Mûrier (1993)	Karielle (1976)	Uriel (1964–1988)	Nankin (1957)
Dam Folamour du Mûrier (1993)	Karielle (1976)	Uriel (1964–1988)	Jesabelle de Baugy (1953)
Dam Folamour du Mûrier (1993)	Karielle (1976)	Camarade Rapide (1968–1987)	Ibrahim (1952–1973)*
Dam Folamour du Mûrier (1993)	Karielle (1976)	Camarade Rapide (1968–1987)	Allegria de Grandchamp (1954)

* Pégase du Mûrier is inbred 4S x 4D to the stallion Ibrahim, meaning that he appears fourth generation on the sire side of his pedigree and fourth generation on the dam side of his pedigree.

== Ancestry and tributes ==
Pégase du Mûrier was featured on the poster for the 2016 Jumping International de Bordeaux.

Since 2019, he has been breeding at the Haras National de Saint-Lô, where he is stationed with the stallion Mylord Carthago.

== Bibliography ==
- Roullier, Sébastien (2014). " Pégase est le cheval de ma vie " – Sébastien Duplant (in French). Grand Prix magazine.
