= Almé Z =

Sport horse stallion

- Breed: Selle Français
- Sire: Ibrahim
- Dam: Girondine
- Maternal grandsire: Ultimate
- Sex: Stallion
- Foaled: 16 April 1966; France
- Died: 21 March 1991 (aged 24); Brulleil, France
- Country: France
- Colour: Bay with blaze, sock right and left fore, half cannon right and left hind
- Breeder: Alphonse Chauvin

Almé Z (16 April 1966 – 21 March 1991) was a 16.1 hh (165 cm) sport horse stallion who was a prolific sire of show jumping horses.

His sire was the Selle Français, Ibrahim. His dam, Girondine, produced three full brothers to Almé, which were all licensed stallions or successful jumpers.

The young stallion was ridden by Bernard Geneste as a five-year-old, before he was purchased and competed by American Fred Lorimer Graham for two years. He was then taken as a mount by François Mathy and Johan Heins, with whom he competed internationally. He won many Grand Prix events, including the Grand Prix of the Netherlands.

== Breeding career ==
Almé had a successful career at stud, which is often compared to that of the champion Thoroughbred stallion, Northern Dancer. He first stood at stud as a five year old, serving France from 1971 to 1974, before standing at Zangersheide from 1975 to 1985. He was then returned to France, where he stood at the Brullemail stud farm until his retirement in 1990, covering 420 mares from across Europe. His stud fee during this time, after having proven himself so well, ranged from F14,000 to F20,000.

During his first 4 years in France, Almé sired the international show jumpers Galoubet, I Love You (2 time World Cup winner), and Jalisco. Jalisco B is the father of super star stallion Quidam de Revel, Galoubet A is the father of Quick Star and of the three times World Cup winner Baloubet du Rouet. While standing at Zangersheide, his offspring were registered in the Hanoverian stud book, where his blood had great influence, and he also made his way into the Holstein stud books through his sons Ahorn Z, Aloubé Z, Athlet Z, and Alexis Z. His grandson, Quidam de Revel, has also been used in Holstein breeding.

Alme is the only horse to have sired 2 World Champions and 3 Olympic horses. His son, Aerobic, became the top priced horse at the PSI Auktion in Ankum (650,000 DM).

Almé's one fault, however, is his progeny's predisposition to scrotal hernia, and several sons and grandsons needed a testicle removed. The stallion had an operation himself due to a hernia, and became a monorchid in 1984.

Almé's Statistics from the 2002 FEI World Equestrian Games in Jerez

- 92 Total horses participated at the WEG: 32 uncastrated males, 31 geldings, 29 mares
- 5 stallions had more than one horse participating:
  - Quidam de Revel (5)
  - Capitol I (4)
  - Le Tot de Semilly (3)
  - Robin IZ (2)
  - Touchdown (2)

Quidam de Revel, Robin I Z, and Touchdown are all grandsons of Almé. Almé had a total of 21 horses (22.3%) in the WEG competition descended from him. At the end of the speed class and Nations Cup, 9 (36%) of the Top 25 horses were descended from Almé. After two rounds of the Individual Championship, 4 (40%) of the Top 10 were descended from Almé. Of the four horses in the final round, 3 (75%) were descended from Almé.

In 2002 his great-granddaughter Liscalgot won World Championship individual gold for Dermott Lennon of Ireland. She is a mare by Touchdown who was by Galoubet A.

== Notable Sons of Almé ==
- Ahorn Z
- Aladin Z
- Alexis Z
- Aloubé Z
- Animo*
- Athlet Z
- Aerobic
- Artos Z
- Galoubet A
- Ilmeo
- I Love You - 1983 World Cup Final Winner
- Jalisco B
- Jalme des Musnuls
- Vico

== Sire line tree ==
Sire line descendant tree
- Almé Z
  - Galoubet A
    - Qredo de Paulstra
      - Caloubet Wood
      - Corsaire de Vauban
      - Quattro B (Ciel d’Espoir)
        - Quantes
        - Quell Charmeur
        - Quando Quando
        - Quantum Tyme
        - Quatier Latin
        - Que Sera
        - Queeno
        - Quinto
        - Quincy
      - Elf of Jaunière
      - Epson Love
      - Experio
      - Lassergut Hym d’Isigny
      - Idalgo du Donjon
      - VDL Groep Sabech d’Ha
    - Quabri de Laleu
    - Quatoubet du Rouet
    - Quick Star
      - Cardinus
      - Qualitative
      - Quality
      - Quebec
      - Quinticus
      - Obos Quality
      - Quality Touch Z
      - Quilot Z
      - Qualandro
      - Quick Lauro Z
      - Quilfilio
      - Quick Star CH
      - Red Star D'Argent
      - Indy Star
      - Quincy Z
      - Quick Study
      - Star Power
      - Orient Express
        - Aldo du Plessis
      - Vito M
      - Big Star
        - Big Star Jr
        - E-Star
      - Papillon de Brekka
      - Petrus de Plessis
    - Touchdown
    - Skippy II
      - Quorum de Laubry
      - Versailles vd Begijnakker
      - Virus de Laubry
      - Apollo van het Lindenbos
    - Surcouf de Revel
    - Vert et Rouge
    - Baloubet du Rouet
      - Gatsby Vandrin
      - Gershwin de Reis
      - Balou du Rouet
        - Balloon
        - Balougraph
        - Balou Star
        - Baltimore
        - Be Bravo
        - Bisquet Balou
        - Burberry
        - Balou Rubin R
      - Balou Grande Z
      - Chaman
      - Southwind
      - West Side van de Meerputhoeve
      - Babluche van het Gelutt Z
      - Bogeno
      - Bubalu
      - Murat de Reve
      - Napoli du Ry
      - Palloubet d'Halong
      - G & C Arrayan (Antonie W)
      - Balturo
    - Caloubet du Rouet
    - En avant du Rouet
    - Premium de Laubry
    - Pall Mall
    - Taloubet Z
  - I Love You
  - Jalisco B
    - Olisco
      - Gold du Talus
    - Papillon Rouge
      - Helios de la Cour II
        - Pommeau du Heup
      - Icare du Manet
      - Iasco Mouche
      - Mozart des Hayettes
        - Ramiro de Bellevue
      - Tresor
    - Quidam de Revel
      - Guidam
        - Luidam
        - Authentic
        - Ninja La Silla
        - Vindicat
      - Belsedène d’Amaury
      - Nabab de Reve
        - Kashmir van Schuttershof
        - Vigo d'Arsouilles
        - Winsome van dee Plataan
        - Bacardi van’t Lambroeck
        - Colombo van den Blauwaert
        - Couscous van Orti
        - London
        - Ensor de Litrange
        - Glasgow-W Van het Merelsnest
        - Cheyenne de la Violle
      - Darios V
      - Diabolo du Parc
      - Dollars Boy
      - Tlaloc La Silla
      - Eyken des Fontenis
      - Happy Villiers
      - Hermès St Lois
      - Huppydam des Horts
      - Quinar Z
      - Jadis de Toscane
      - Quaprice de Bois Margot
      - Quasimodo Z
      - Quidams Rubin
      - Verde TN
      - Paris-Texas
      - Sterrehof’s Calimero
    - Quito de Baussy
    - Rochet M
    - Scherif d'Elle
    - Djalisco du Guet
    - Dollar du Mûrier
      - Idéal de la Loge
        - Power de Puychety
        - Qoud'coeur de la Loge
        - Reiki du Vent
        - Scala des Champs
        - Ultimatum Ideal
  - Jalme des Musnuls
  - Joyau d’Or A
  - Alexis Z
  - Lord Gordon
  - Ahorn Z
    - Aar
    - Amaro
    - Antares
    - Lord Arico
    - Acord I
    - Acapulco
    - Acord II
      - Action Hero
      - Ars Vivendi
      - Broere VDL Atlantic
      - Acorado
      - Antaeus
      - In Style
      - As di Villagana
      - Alboretto
      - All In One
      - VDL Atlantic
    - Acord III
  - Aerobic
  - Aloubé Z
  - Athlet Z
    - Adelfos
      - Pégase du Mûrier
  - Vico
  - Almeo
  - Aladin Z
  - Animo
  - Artos Z
  - Ilmeo

== See also ==
- Coulisa
- Pégase du Mûrier
- Otello du Soleil
- Ibrahim (stallion)
- Twentytwo des Biches
