= Roger-Yves Bost =

French equestrian

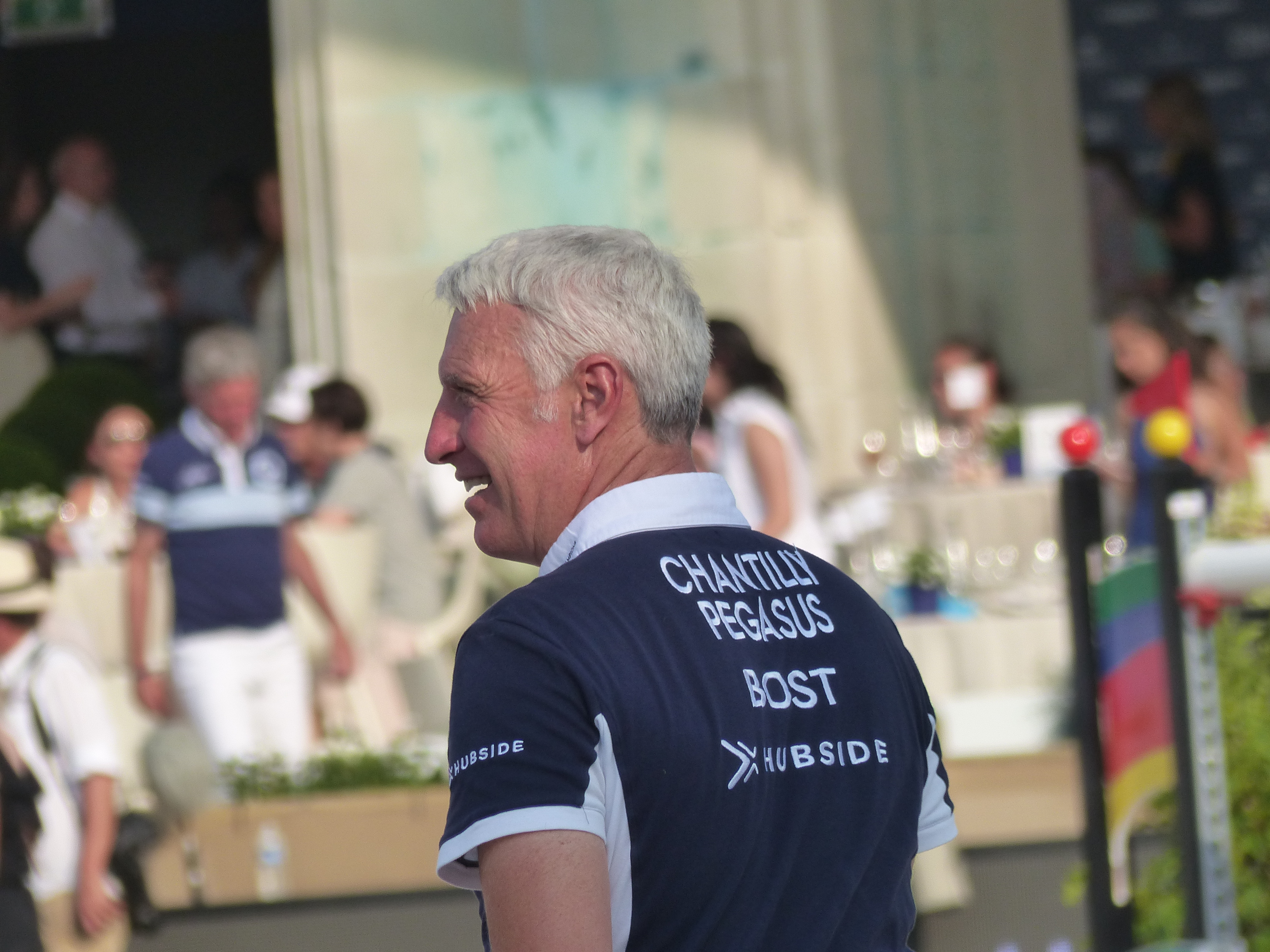
- Bost in 2018, Paris Eiffel Jumping

Personal information
- Born: 21 October 1965 (age 61) Boulogne-Billancourt, France
- Height: 176 cm (5 ft 9 in)
- Weight: 80 kg (176 lb)

Sport
- Sport: Show jumping
- Club: Haras des Brulys Barbizon
- Coached by: Philippe Guerdat (national)
Medal record
Equestrian
Representing France
Olympic Games
Gold medal – first place	2016 Rio de Janeiro	Team jumping
World Championships
Gold medal – first place	1990 Stockholm	Team jumping
Silver medal – second place	1994 Den Haag	Team jumping
Silver medal – second place	1998 Rome	Team jumping
European Championships
Gold medal – first place	2013 Herning	Individual jumping
Bronze medal – third place	1995 St. Gallen	Team jumping
Mediterranean Games
Gold medal – first place	1993 Languedoc-Roussillon	Team jumping

Roger-Yves Bost (born 21 October 1965) is a French show jumping rider. He won a team gold medal at the 2016 Rio Games and finished fourth at the 1996 Olympics.

Bost started competing in horse riding aged eight following his father, Roger Sr., a former international equestrian. Bost's children Clementine and Nicolas are also competitive equestrians. In 2007 he received the Order of Agricultural Merit from the French government.

== International Championship Results ==
Results
Year	Event	Horse	Placing	Notes
1983	European Young Rider Championships	Jorphee du Prieur	3rd place, bronze medalist(s)	Team
1983	European Young Rider Championships	Jorphee du Prieur	1st place, gold medalist(s)	Individual
1985	European Young Rider Championships	Jorphee du Prieur	2nd place, silver medalist(s)	Team
1985	European Young Rider Championships	Jorphee du Prieur	2nd place, silver medalist(s)	Individual
1989	World Cup Final	Norton de Rhuys	35th	
1990	World Cup Final	Norton de Rhuys	4th	
1990	World Equestrian Games	Norton de Rhuys	1st place, gold medalist(s)	Team
1990	World Equestrian Games	Norton de Rhuys	22nd	Individual
1991	World Cup Final	Norton de Rhuys	3rd place, bronze medalist(s)	
1991	European Championships	Norton de Rhuys	4th	Team
1991	European Championships	Norton de Rhuys	18th	Individual
1992	World Cup Final	President Papillon Rose	10th	
1993	World Cup Final	Norton de Rhuys	27th	
1994	World Equestrian Games	Souviens Toi	2nd place, silver medalist(s)	Team
1994	World Equestrian Games	Souviens Toi	6th	Individual
1995	World Cup Final	Souviens Toi	16th	
1995	European Championships	Souviens Toi	3rd place, bronze medalist(s)	Team
1995	European Championships	Souviens Toi	16th	Individual
1996	World Cup Final	Souviens Toi	14th	
1996	Olympic Games	Souviens Toi	4th	Team
1996	Olympic Games	Souviens Toi	41st	Individual
1998	World Equestrian Games	Airborne Montecillo	2nd place, silver medalist(s)	Team
1998	World Equestrian Games	Airborne Montecillo	28th	Individual
2009	European Championships	Ideal de la Loge	5th	Team
2009	European Championships	Ideal de la Loge	29th	Individual
2013	World Cup Final	Castle Forbes Myrtille Paulois	22nd	
2013	European Championships	Castle Forbes Myrtille Paulois	4th	Team
2013	European Championships	Castle Forbes Myrtille Paulois	1st place, gold medalist(s)	Individual
2016	Olympic Games	Sydney Une Prince	1st place, gold medalist(s)	Team
2016	Olympic Games	Sydney Une Prince	16th	Individual
2017	European Championships	Sangria du Coty	7th	Team
2017	European Championships	Sangria du Coty	26th	Individual
2018	World Cup Final	Sangria du Coty	13th	
EL = Eliminated; RET = Retired; WD = Withdrew

== See also ==
- Pégase du Mûrier (Roger-Yves Bost's horse)
