= In Style (horse) =

Show jumping horse

- Breed: Holsteiner
- Sire: Acord II
- Dam: Diana
- Maternal grandsire: Lord
- Sex: Gelding
- Foaled: 1995
- Died: September 27, 2015 (aged 19–20)
- Country: Canada
- Colour: Brown
- Owner: Lothlorien Farms
- Rider: Ian Millar

Olympic medal record

Equestrian
Silver medal – second place	2008 Beijing	Team jumping

In Style was a Holsteiner gelding ridden by Canadian Equestrian Team member Ian Millar in the sport of show jumping. He was imported to Canada from the Netherlands in 2003. His full brother, VDL Atlantic, is also an international show jumper. Furthermore, VDL Atlantic was a Zangersheide-approved stallion with approved sons of his own. The dam of In Style and Atlantic is Diana, a full sister to Lord Z, himself a strong sire and FEI show jumper under Franke Sloothaak and John Whitaker. In Style was reported to be a sensitive horse with a Thoroughbred-like disposition.

In Style was best known for representing Canada on the international scene. He and Ian Millar were members of silver medal teams at both the 2007 Rio de Janeiro Pan American Games and the 2008 Beijing Olympic Games.

== Pedigree ==
Pedigree of In Style
Sire Acord II 1987 Holsteiner	Ahorn Z 1979 Holsteiner	Almé Z 1966 Selle Francais	Ibrahim (1952)
Sire Acord II 1987 Holsteiner	Ahorn Z 1979 Holsteiner	Almé Z 1966 Selle Francais	Girondine (1950)
Sire Acord II 1987 Holsteiner	Ahorn Z 1979 Holsteiner	Heureka Z 1960 Holsteiner	Ganeff (1947)
Sire Acord II 1987 Holsteiner	Ahorn Z 1979 Holsteiner	Heureka Z 1960 Holsteiner	Nobida (1954)
Sire Acord II 1987 Holsteiner	Ribecka; 1979 Holsteiner	Calypso I 1973 Holsteiner	Cor de la Bryere (1968)
Sire Acord II 1987 Holsteiner	Ribecka; 1979 Holsteiner	Calypso I 1973 Holsteiner	Tabelle (1959)
Sire Acord II 1987 Holsteiner	Ribecka; 1979 Holsteiner	Gerlis; 1970 Holsteiner	Lancaster (1966)
Sire Acord II 1987 Holsteiner	Ribecka; 1979 Holsteiner	Gerlis; 1970 Holsteiner	Urbine (1960)
Dam Diana Holsteiner	Lord; 1967 Holsteiner	Ladykiller xx 1961 Thoroughbred	Sailing Light xx (1949)
Dam Diana Holsteiner	Lord; 1967 Holsteiner	Ladykiller xx 1961 Thoroughbred	Lone Beech xx (1950)
Dam Diana Holsteiner	Lord; 1967 Holsteiner	Viola; 1961 Holsteiner	Cottage Son xx (1944)
Dam Diana Holsteiner	Lord; 1967 Holsteiner	Viola; 1961 Holsteiner	Ricarda (1957)
Dam Diana Holsteiner	Thia; 1984 Holsteiner	Calando I 1974 Holsteiner	Cor de la Bryere (1968)
Dam Diana Holsteiner	Thia; 1984 Holsteiner	Calando I 1974 Holsteiner	Furgund (1969)
Dam Diana Holsteiner	Thia; 1984 Holsteiner	Gabriela; 1970 Holsteiner	Meteor xx (1963)
Dam Diana Holsteiner	Thia; 1984 Holsteiner	Gabriela; 1970 Holsteiner	Bandara
