= Baloubet du Rouet =

Horse ridden by Rodrigo Pessoa (1989–2017)

Baloubet du Rouet (1989-2017)
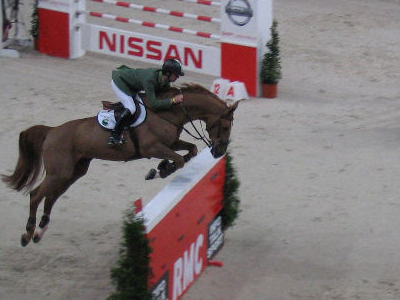
- Baloubet du Rouet and Rodrigo Pessoa
- Breed: Selle Français; also approved for Holstein, Belgian Sport, Belgian Warmblood, Swedish Warmblood, and Hanoverian studbooks
- Sire: Galoubet A
- Grandsire: Almé Z
- Dam: Mesange du Rouet
- Maternal grandsire: Starter
- Sex: 16.3 hh Stallion
- Foaled: 8 May 1989; Saint-Aubin-de-Terregatte, France
- Died: 7 August 2017 (aged 28); Portugal
- Country: Brazil
- Colour: Chestnut with a stripe, sock off fore, half-cannon near hind
- Breeder: Louis Fardin (France)
- Owner: Diogo Pereira Coutinho
- Trainer: Rodrigo Pessoa

Baloubet du Rouet
Medal record

Equestrian

Olympic Games
Gold medal – first place	2004 Athens	Individual Jumping
Bronze medal – third place	2000 Sydney	Team Jumping

Baloubet du Rouet (8 May 1989 – 7 August 2017) was a horse ridden by the Brazilian show jumper Rodrigo Pessoa. He has won many international titles.

Born in 1989, Baloubet du Rouet won many of the greatest international show jumping competitions, including several world cup titles and two Olympic medals with the Brazilian team. In 1999, he won the World Cup Final in Gothenburg for the second time running, a feat that had only been done by 3 horses since the start of the World Cup competitions. At the World Cup Finals in 2000, he won for a record third time. He was quite successful at a young age, when ridden by Nelson Pessoa on the French circuit, including winning the 7 year old stallion test at Fontainebleau. However, the stallion became most competitive when he became the mount of Nelson's son, Rodrigo, as a nine-year-old. 2004 he won the gold medal at the Olympic Games in Athens, 2003 and 2005 the Top Ten in Geneva. Baloubet was retired from competition in 2006 and from breeding in 2010, living in Portugal during his later years. He died in August 7th, 2017, and his death was announced a few days later.

Although his reproductive life had started in 1998, it was at age 17 that he came fully available for reproduction. Baloubet was approved by all studbooks of warm-blooded sports horses and sired several nice horses including Gitane du Brumans II, Gatsby Vandrin, Gonzague du Rouet, Gershwin de Reis, Balou Grande Z (winner of the 30-day stallion test in 2002 at Neustadt/Dosse) and Balou du Rouet. He was especially popular in Germany, Belgium, and Holland. In 2010 his son Balturo (Baloubet du Rouet x Canturo) was licensed by the Oldenburg International Studbook.

== Sire line tree ==
- Baloubet du Rouet
  - Gatsby Vandrin
  - Gershwin de Reis
  - Balou du Rouet
    - Balloon
    - Balougraph
    - Balou Star
    - Baltimore
    - Be Bravo
    - Bisquet Balou
    - Burberry
    - Balou Rubin R
  - Balou Grande Z
  - Chaman
  - Southwind
  - West Side van de Meerputhoeve
  - Babluche van het Gelutt Z
  - Bogeno
  - Bubalu
  - Murat de Reve
  - Napoli du Ry
  - Palloubet d'Halong
  - G & C Arrayan (Antonie W)
  - Balturo

== Breeding ==
His sire, Galoubet A, was also an impressive show jumper. Ridden by the French rider Gilles Bertran de Balanda, he won 19 International Grand Prix's and was on the French Gold Medal-winning team at the 1982 Show Jumping World Championships in Dublin, Ireland.

Baloubet's dam, Mesange du Rouet, was out of the mare Badine and by the well-known broodmare-sire Starter. She was therefore linebred to the great Thoroughbred Rantzau. She won 8 of 13 competitions at age four, and 5 wins out of 12 at age five, before becoming a broodmare and producing 5 foals. Mesange du Rouet was also the dam of the impressive Unadore de Rouet (sired by J’T’Adore), who attained a jumping index of 171, and went on to compete under Jean-Marc Nicolas and Olivier Guillon.

Pedigree of Baloubet du Rouet
Sire Galoubet A b. 1972	Almé Z br. 1966	Ibrahim br. 1952	The Last Orange
Sire Galoubet A b. 1972	Almé Z br. 1966	Ibrahim br. 1952	Vaillante
Sire Galoubet A b. 1972	Almé Z br. 1966	Girondine br. 1950	Ultimate
Sire Galoubet A b. 1972	Almé Z br. 1966	Girondine br. 1950	Jvins Mars
Sire Galoubet A b. 1972	Viti ch. 1965	Nystag b. 1957	Abner
Sire Galoubet A b. 1972	Viti ch. 1965	Nystag b. 1957	Gustine
Sire Galoubet A b. 1972	Viti ch. 1965	Ida de Bourgoin ch. 1952	Boum II
Sire Galoubet A b. 1972	Viti ch. 1965	Ida de Bourgoin ch. 1952	Chouquette de Bourgoin
Dam Mesange du Rouet ch. 1978	Starter ch. 1962	Rantzau* ch. 1946	Foxlight
Dam Mesange du Rouet ch. 1978	Starter ch. 1962	Rantzau* ch. 1946	Rancune
Dam Mesange du Rouet ch. 1978	Starter ch. 1962	Kaironnaise ch. 1954	Jus de Pomme
Dam Mesange du Rouet ch. 1978	Starter ch. 1962	Kaironnaise ch. 1954	Tamise
Dam Mesange du Rouet ch. 1978	Badine ch. 1967	Bel Avenir; 1945	Lavenir
Dam Mesange du Rouet ch. 1978	Badine ch. 1967	Bel Avenir; 1945	Nicaella
Dam Mesange du Rouet ch. 1978	Badine ch. 1967	Perle de Norval ch. 1959	Rantzau*
Dam Mesange du Rouet ch. 1978	Badine ch. 1967	Perle de Norval ch. 1959	Hautesse

* Baloubet du Rouet is inbred 3D x 4D to the stallion Rantzau, meaning that he appears third generation and fourth generation on the dam side of his pedigree.

== Achievements ==
- As a six-year-old, was a finalist, and as a 7-year-old, the champion of France
- Individually 11th and Team 5th place at the 1998 FEI World Equestrian Games (Rome)
- 1st place in World Cup Final 1998 (Helsinki), 1999 (Gothenburg) and 2000 (Las Vegas)
- Team Bronze Medal 2000 Olympics in Sydney
- 2nd place in 2001 World Cup Final (Gothenburg)
- 1st place in the Paris-Bercy Grand Prix
- 3rd place at the Spruce Meadows Grand Prix
- 3rd place Geneva Grand Prix
- Individual Gold medal 2004 Olympics in Athens
- 2004 Elected Best Horse in the World
- 2005 Winner of the Las Vegas World Invitational Grand Prix
- 2006 1st Place Winner of the Budweiser Invitational, Tampa, Florida
