= Otello du Soleil =

Named French sport horse

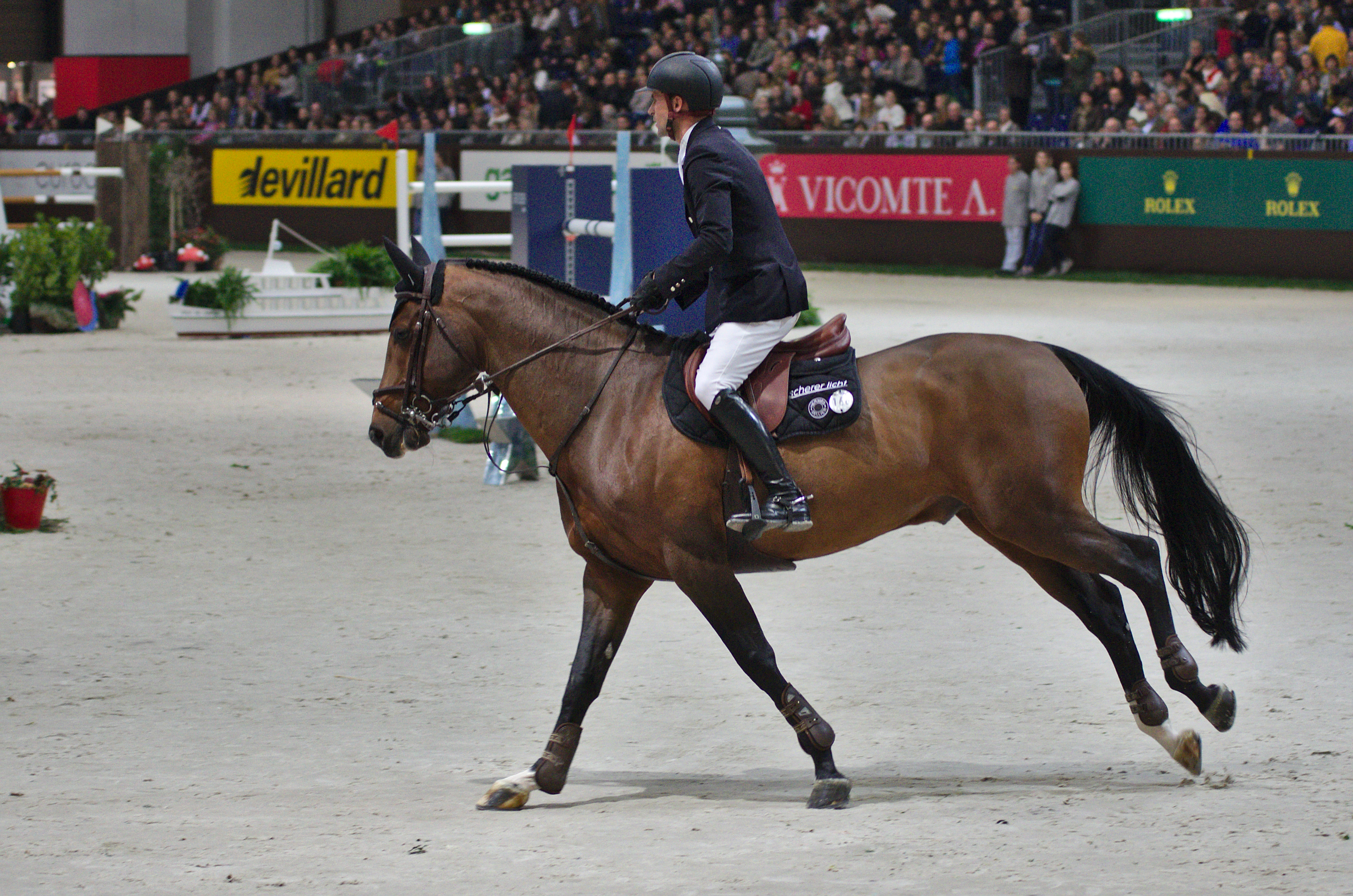
- Otello du Soleil ridden by Romain Duguet during the Prix Crédit Suisse at the 54th Geneva International Horse Show, December 2014.
- Breed: Selle Français
- Sire: Alligator Fontaine
- Dam: Fleur de Pivoine
- Foaled: Cossaye
- Color: Bay

Otello du Soleil (March 15, 2002 – November 2023) was a bay-colored sport horse registered in the Selle Français studbook, who has been ridden mainly by Swiss show jumper Romain Duguet. He was a son of Alligator Fontaine and a daughter of Papillon Rouge.

While he enabled Romain Duguet to break through to the highest level of show jumping competitions in 2011, notably with a victory at the Nations Cup stage in Sopot, Otello du Soleil is best known for having violently attacked the mare Quismy des Vaux in early June 2015, on the sidelines of the CSIO in Saint-Gallen Switzerland, leading to the cessation of the mare's sporting career, then to a court settlement. He competed in a number of 1.60 m show jumping events, including the highly regarded Spruce Meadows CSIO in September 2015. From summer 2017, his owner Christiana Duguet, wife of Romain Duguet, rode him in competitions up to CSI2* level.

His sporting retirement was scheduled for the end of November 2019.

== History ==
=== Early years ===
Otello du Soleil was born on March 15, 2002 at Marianne Eichenberger's domaine du Soleil in Cossaye, Nièvre (France).

He was ridden by Gilles Veron until he was 6 years old, then moved to the stables of Clément Boulanger and Kevin Staut, before moving to Benjamin Robert's stables for his 7-year-old competition season.

=== Acquisition by Christiana Duguet ===
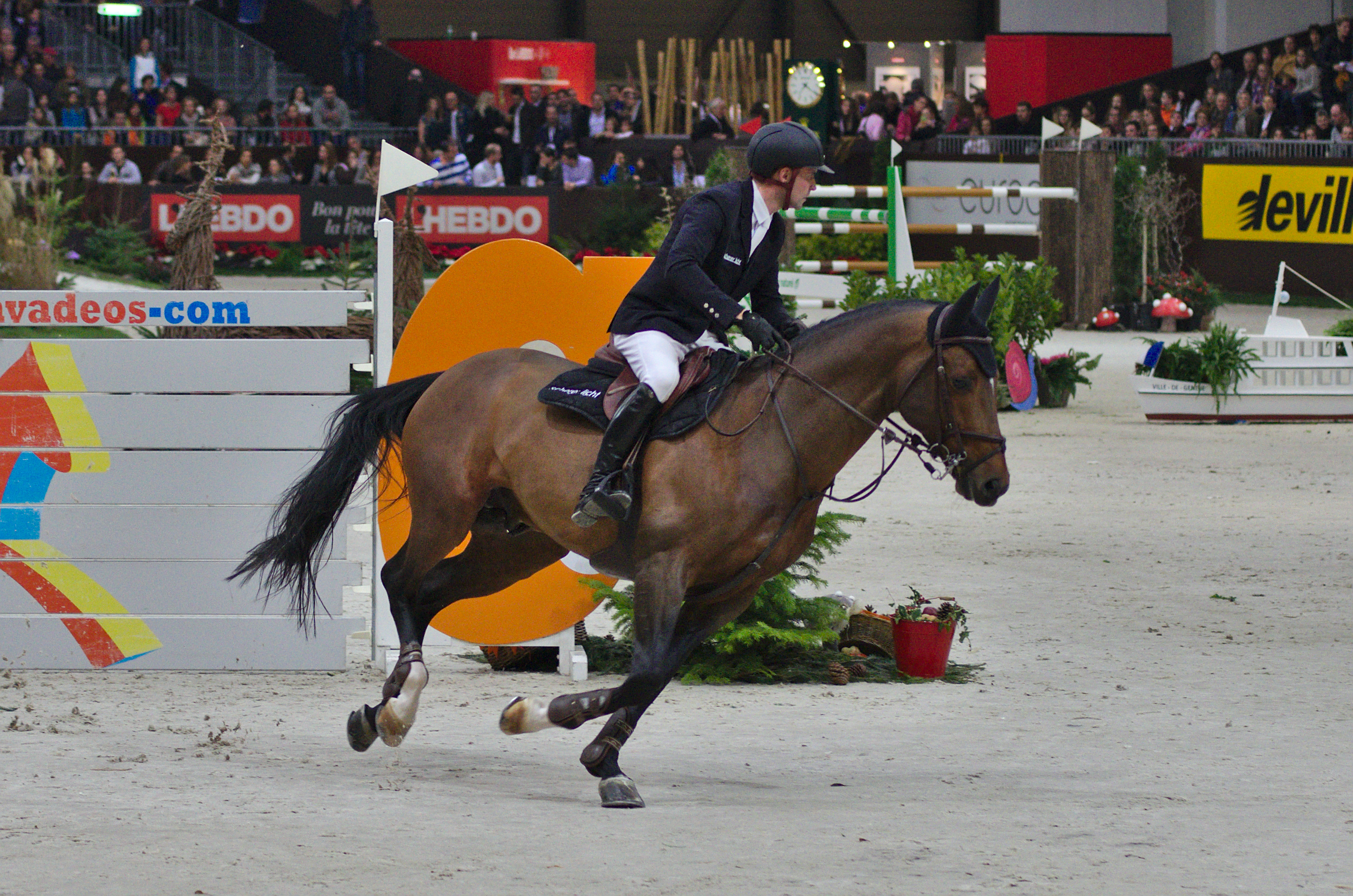
Otello du Soleil ridden by Romain Duguet during the 54th CHI de Genève, December 2014.

Owned by Swiss rider Christiana Duguet in 2010, he has spent most of his sporting career with her husband, Swiss rider Romain Duguet: Christiana Duguet is particularly keen to help Romain break through at the highest level of show jumping; it is Otello du Soleil's presence in her stables that enables him to do so, notably in 2011.

In 2011, he won the Nations Cup at the official 3-star International Show Jumping Competition (CSIO3*) in Sopot. For his first appearance at the renowned Geneva International Horse Show in December 2011, he finished 3rd in a 1.45 m class.

In October 2012, he was immobilized due to an inflamed suspensory muscle.

He finished second in a 1.50 m event in St. Gallen, two tenths of a beat behind winner Olivier Philippaerts. He then went on to win a 1.50 m event at the CSIO5* in Rotterdam in June 2014, counting towards the Longines ranking, with the fastest clear round of the 51 starters; a fault in Thursday's jump-off had demoted him to 13th place.

At the CSIO in St. Gallen, Switzerland, on June 6, 2015, he lost out in the hunter class (1.45 m) to Belgian rider Grégory Wathelet on Egano vh Slogenhof, despite a very fast finish and a very short turn over vertical obstacle no. 13. On the night of June 6 to 7, 2015, taking advantage of a safety system failure, Otello du Soleil left his demountable stall and broke the stall latch of the mare Quismy des Vaux, whom he tried to jump, attacking her and seriously injuring her, to the point of ending the mare's sporting career. Quismy probably defended herself, as Otello du Soleil suffered minor chest and head injuries. The case is settled in court.

He competed at the famous CHIO Aachen on bar heights of 1.55 m in August 2015, completing a faultless first round, but finishing his second round with 8 points, giving him 6th place. In September 2015, he jumped during the highly-regarded Spruce Meadows CSIO in Calgary, dropping a bar in each of the two 1.60 m events he took part in, which didn't prevent him from finishing 9th in the Akita Drilling Cup standings, then 6th in the six-bar event.

In fine form for his first outings of 2016, in March he won the speed event at the CSI5* (Concours de saut international 5 étoiles) in Paris at the Grand Palais, as well as 5th place in the Prix Hermès sellier, both over 1.50 m obstacles. He did not take part in the 2016 Summer Olympics in Rio de Janeiro, as Romain Duguet preferred his mare Quorida de Treho.

From summer 2017, he was ridden by his owner Christiana Duguet, up to CSI2* level. He was retired from sport at the end of November 2019, at the age of 17: Christiana Duguet announced the news on social networks, specifying that Otello is still in good shape. The horse had been in her stables for almost 10 years.

=== Death ===
Otello of the Sun died on November 4 or 5, 2023, at the age of 21.

== Description ==
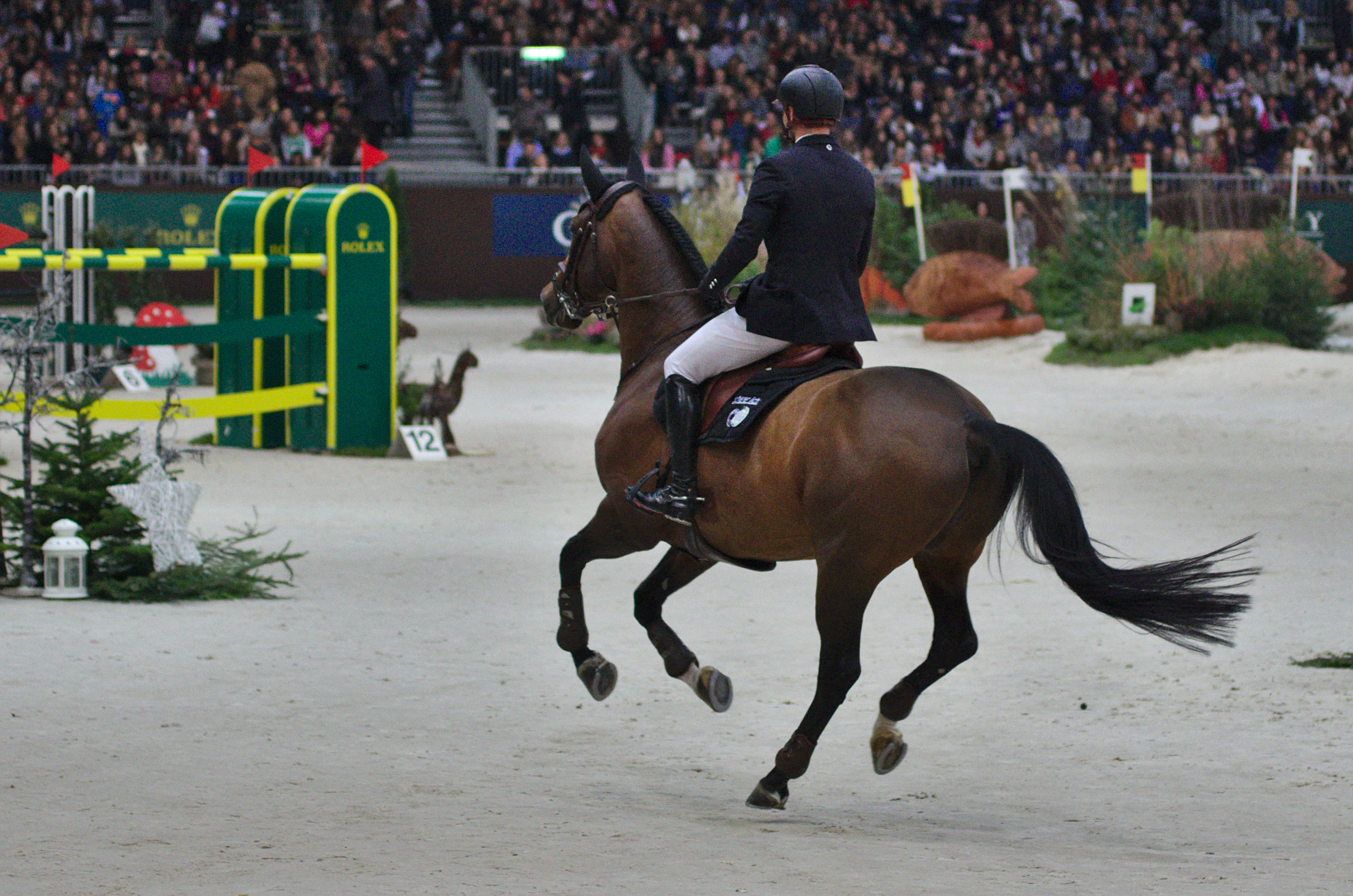
Otello du Soleil ridden by Romain Duguet during the 54th CHI de Genève, December 2014.

Otello du Soleil was a bay male sport horse registered in the Selle Français studbook. He was 1.65 m tall. Christiana Duguet called him "King Toto".

== Awards ==
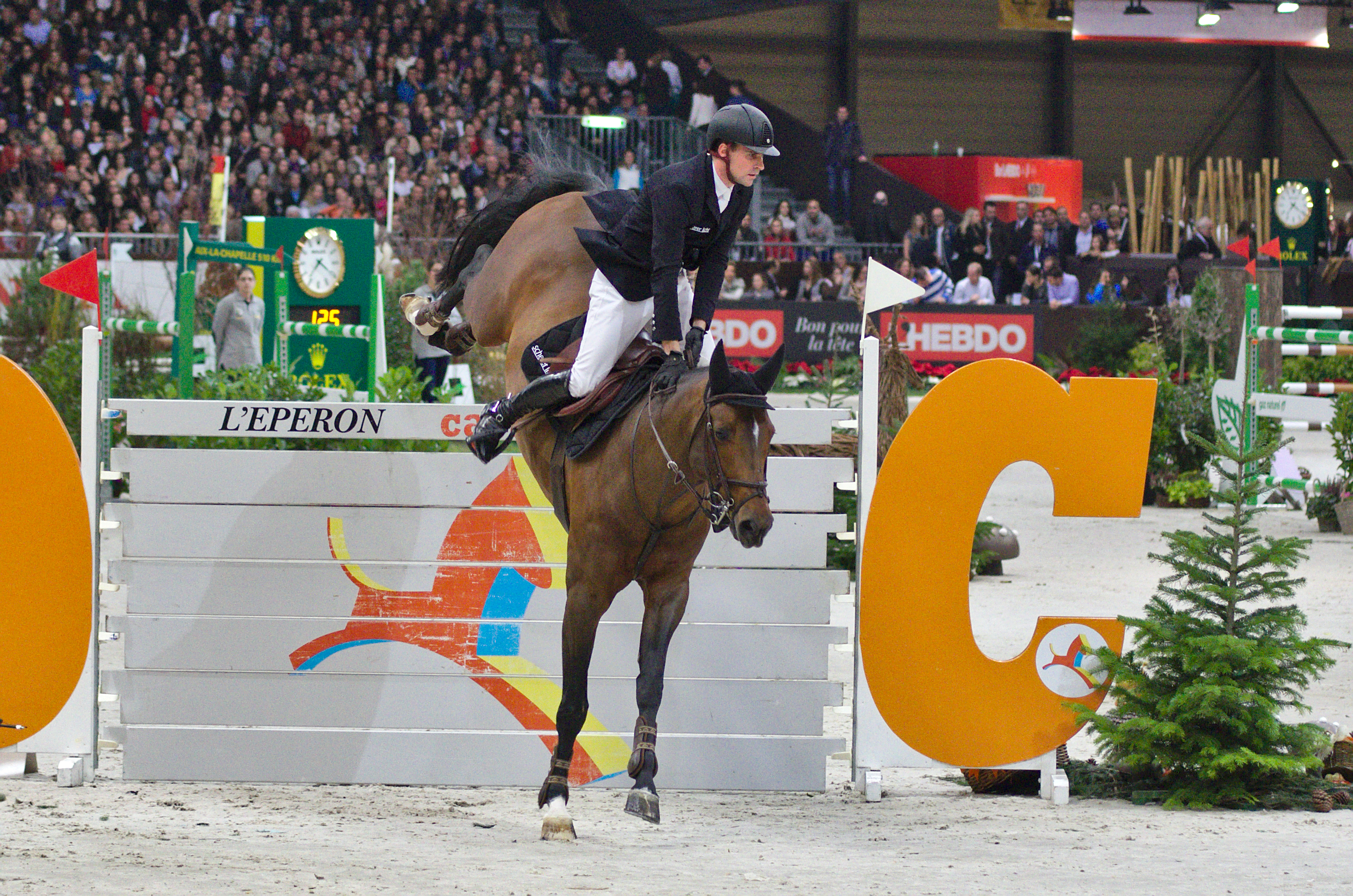
Otello du Soleil ridden by Romain Duguet during the 54th CHI de Genève, December 2014.

Otello du Soleil has won 11 of his 313 show jumping competitions during his sporting career.

=== In 2010 ===
- September 16, 2010: second in the Grand Prix La Nazione at 1.60 m, CSI3* La Bagnaia

=== In 2011 ===
- April 28, 2011: 3rd in a 1.45 m class at CSI3* Maubeuge
- May 12, 2011: 5th in the Nations Cup at 1.60 m at CSIO4* Linz-Ebelsberg
- June 2, 2011: 5th in a 1.55 m class at the CSI4* in Bourg-en-Bresse
- June 9, 2011: Winner of the Nations' Cup 1.40 m-1.60 m at the CSIO3* in Sopot
- June 23, 2011: 5th in a 1.55 m class at the CSI4* in Geesteren
- August 11, 2011: 4th in the Nations Cup at 1.40 m-1.60 m at CSI03*-W-NC Bratislava
- October 13, 2011: winner of a 1.45 m class at the CSI2* in Chevenez
- December 1, 2011: 4th in a 1.55 m class at CSI4* Salzburg
- December 8, 2011: 3rd in a 1.45 m class at the Concours hippique international de Genève

=== In 2012 ===
- March 13, 2012: second in the Grand Prix of the CSI3* in Vejer de la Frontera, at 1.50 m
- May 18, 2012: winner of a 1.50 m class at the CSI3* San Giovanni in Marignano
- July 19, 2012: second in a 1.50 m class at the CSI3* in Ascona
- August 16, 2012: 5th in a 1.50 m class at the CSI3* in Hachenburg

=== In 2013 ===
He achieved an ISO jumping index of 156 in 2013.

- June 7, 2013: second in a 1.40 m class at the CSIO3*-Nations Cup in Lisbon
- August 23, 2013: 3rd in a 1.45 m class at the CSI3* in Verbier
- December 6, 2013: 3rd in a 1.50 m class at the CSI4* Salzburg competition
- December 8, 2013: 7th in the CSI4* Salzburg Grand Prix, at 1.60 m

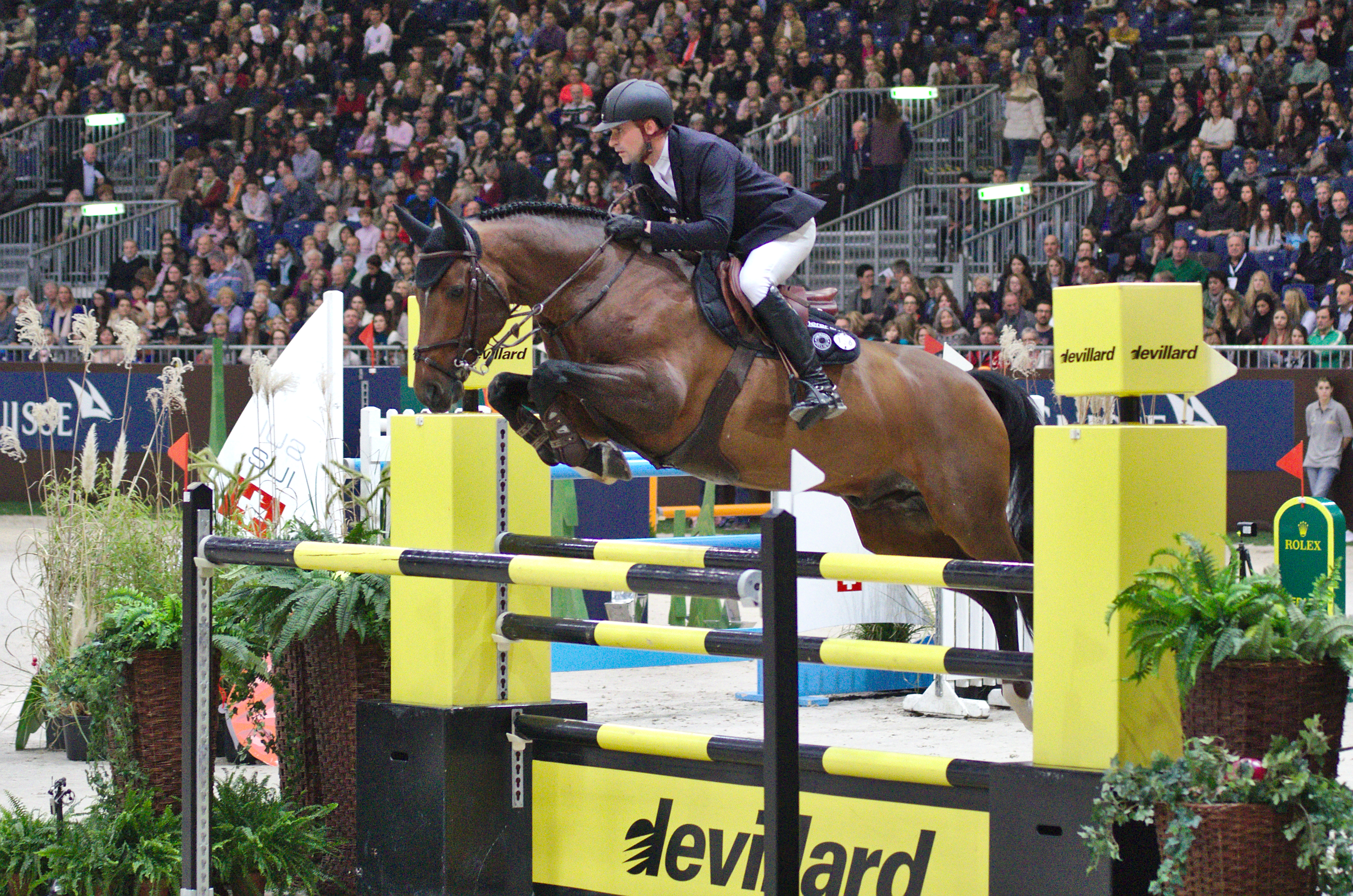
Otello du Soleil ridden by Romain Duguet during the 54th CHI de Genève, December 2014.

=== In 2014 ===
He achieved an ISO of 168 in 2014.

- January 24, 2014: 3rd in a 1.45 mau CSI5* World Cup stage in Zurich
- February 28, 2014: 4th in a 1.50 mau CSI3* in Vejer de la Frontera
- May 31, 2014: second in a 1.50 m class at the CSIO5* Nations' Cup in St. Gallen
- June 20, 2014: winner of a 1.50 m class at the Rotterdam CSIO5*

=== In 2015 ===
He achieved an ISO of 169 in 2015.

- April 24, 2015: 5th at the CSI4* in Hagen, at 1.50 m
- May 31, 2015: 3rd in the Bourg-en-Bresse CSI4*, at 1.45 m
- June 6, 2015: second in a hunt at 1.45 m at the CSIO5* Nations Cup in St. Gallen
- July 10, 2015: 6th in a 1.45-m class at the CSIO5* Nations' Cup in Falsterbo
- August 2, 2015: winner of a 1.45 m class at the CSIO5* Nations Cup in Hickstead
- August 22, 2015: 5th in a 1.55 m class at the CHIO Aachen
- September 9, 2015: 9th in the Akita Drilling Cup at Spruce Meadows CSIO, at 1.60 m
- September 11, 2015: 6th in the six-bar event at Spruce Meadows CSIO, at 1.60 m
- November 6, 2015: winner of the Grand Prix at the CSI4* in Liège, at 1.50 m
- December 6, 2015: winner of the Grand Prix CSI4* in Salzburg, at 1.60 m

=== In 2016 ===
He achieved an ISO of 169 in 2016.

- January 30, 2016: second in the Grand Prix at the CSI5* in Zurich, at 1.40 m
- March 12, 2016: winner of competition 4 at the CSI5* in Bois-le-Duc, at 1.40 m
- May 27, 2016: winner of the Prix de la ville de Paris and 5th in the Prix Hermès sellier at the CSI5* in Paris, at 1.50 m
- May 27, 2016: 3rd in the Global Champions Tour stage at the CSI5* in Chantilly, at 1.50 m
- June 4, 2016: 8th in the Prix à 1.45 m at the CSIO5*-NC St. Gallen, with Romain Duguet
- December 9, 2016: 5th in the Prix à 1,45 m at the CSI5* in Geneva, with Romain Duguet

=== In 2017 ===
He achieved an ISO of 146 in 2017.

- January 28, 2017: 3rd in the Prix 1.40 m at the CSI5*-W in Zurich, with Romain Duguet
- July 21, 2017: 3rd prize at 1.15 m-1.20 m at CSIAm-B Ascona, with Christiana Duguet
- July 28, 2017: 3rd in the 1.20 m class at the CSI1* in Crans-Montana, with Christiana Duguet
- September 1, 2017: 4th in the 1.20 m class at the CSIAm-B in Humlikon, with Christiana Duguet

=== In 2018 ===
- February 24, 2018: second in a 1.10 m class at the Oliva CSI1*, with Christiana Duguet
- June 8, 2018: 3rd in a 1.30 m class at the Gorla Minore CSI3*, with Christiana Duguet
- June 22, 2018: 4th in a 1.25 m class at the in Busto Arsizio CSI1*, with Christiana Duguet
- July 8, 2018: second in a 1.25 m class at the CSIAm-B in Dettighofen - Albführen, with Christiana Duguet
- August 19, 2018: 4th in a 1.35 m event at the CSIAm-A in Donaueschingen, with Christiana Duguet
- August 30, 2018: 5th in a 1.20m-1.25m event at the CSIAm-B in Humlikon, with Christiana Duguet
- October 13, 2018: 6th in a 1.30 m class at the Oliva CSI1*, with Christiana Duguet
- November 17, 2018: winner of a 1.25 m class at the Vermezzo CSI1*, with Christiana Duguet

=== In 2019 ===
- March 17, 2019: 5th in a 1.30 m class at the CSI2* Gorla Minore, with Christiana Duguet
- March 28, 2019: 4th in a 1.20-m class at the CSI3* Gorla Minore, with Christiana Duguet
- July 20, 2019: 4th in a 1.30 m class at the CSIAm-A in Ascona, with Christiana Duguet
- August 4, 2019: 4th in a 1.40 m event at the CSIAm-A in Donaueschingen-Immenhöfe, with Christiana Duguet
- September 27, 2019: 4th in a 1.15 m class at the CSI1* Gorla Minore, with Christiana Duguet

== Origins ==
Otello du Soleil was a son of the Selle Français stallion Alligator Fontaine, and the Selle Français mare Fleur de pivoine, by Papillon Rouge. His maternal great-granddam Joyeuse de Choisy was also the dam of the stallion Apache d'Adriers.

He is 58% Thoroughbred, 39% Selle Français and similar. He was an original Selle Français, with no foreign crosses over 4 generations.

Pedigree of Otello du Soleil (2002)
Sire Alligator Fontaine (1988-2018)	Gayssire Fleury (1972-1992)	Sire (1965)	Mourne (1954)
Sire Alligator Fontaine (1988-2018)	Gayssire Fleury (1972-1992)	Sire (1965)	Sariegail (1956)
Sire Alligator Fontaine (1988-2018)	Gayssire Fleury (1972-1992)	Capucine (1968)	Khereddine (1954)
Sire Alligator Fontaine (1988-2018)	Gayssire Fleury (1972-1992)	Capucine (1968)	Marjolaine (1956)
Sire Alligator Fontaine (1988-2018)	Nighty Fontaine (1979-2008)	Dark Tiger (1959)	Nasrullah (1940-1959)
Sire Alligator Fontaine (1988-2018)	Nighty Fontaine (1979-2008)	Dark Tiger (1959)	Spotted Beauty (1941)
Sire Alligator Fontaine (1988-2018)	Nighty Fontaine (1979-2008)	Elyria (1970)	Nykio (1957)
Sire Alligator Fontaine (1988-2018)	Nighty Fontaine (1979-2008)	Elyria (1970)	L'Echappée (1956)
Dam Fleur de Pivoine (1993-2016)	Papillon Rouge (1981-2009)	Jalisco B (1975-1994)	Almé Z (1966-1991)
Dam Fleur de Pivoine (1993-2016)	Papillon Rouge (1981-2009)	Jalisco B (1975-1994)	Tanagra (1963)
Dam Fleur de Pivoine (1993-2016)	Papillon Rouge (1981-2009)	Verboise (1965)	Centaure du Bois (1946)
Dam Fleur de Pivoine (1993-2016)	Papillon Rouge (1981-2009)	Verboise (1965)	Lorette (1955)
Dam Fleur de Pivoine (1993-2016)	Pivoine de Choisy (1981-2008)	Double Espoir (1969-1994)	Ibrahim (1952-1973)
Dam Fleur de Pivoine (1993-2016)	Pivoine de Choisy (1981-2008)	Double Espoir (1969-1994)	Quatrième Espoir (1960)
Dam Fleur de Pivoine (1993-2016)	Pivoine de Choisy (1981-2008)	Joyeuse de Choisy (1975-1995)	No info
Dam Fleur de Pivoine (1993-2016)	Pivoine de Choisy (1981-2008)	Joyeuse de Choisy (1975-1995)	No info

== Descent ==
While Otello du Soleil is listed as a whole horse (potential sire) or stallion in most databases (he certainly was until 2015), other sources, notably the Fédération équestre internationale, list him as a gelding, i.e. castrated.
