= Selle Français =

Breed of horse

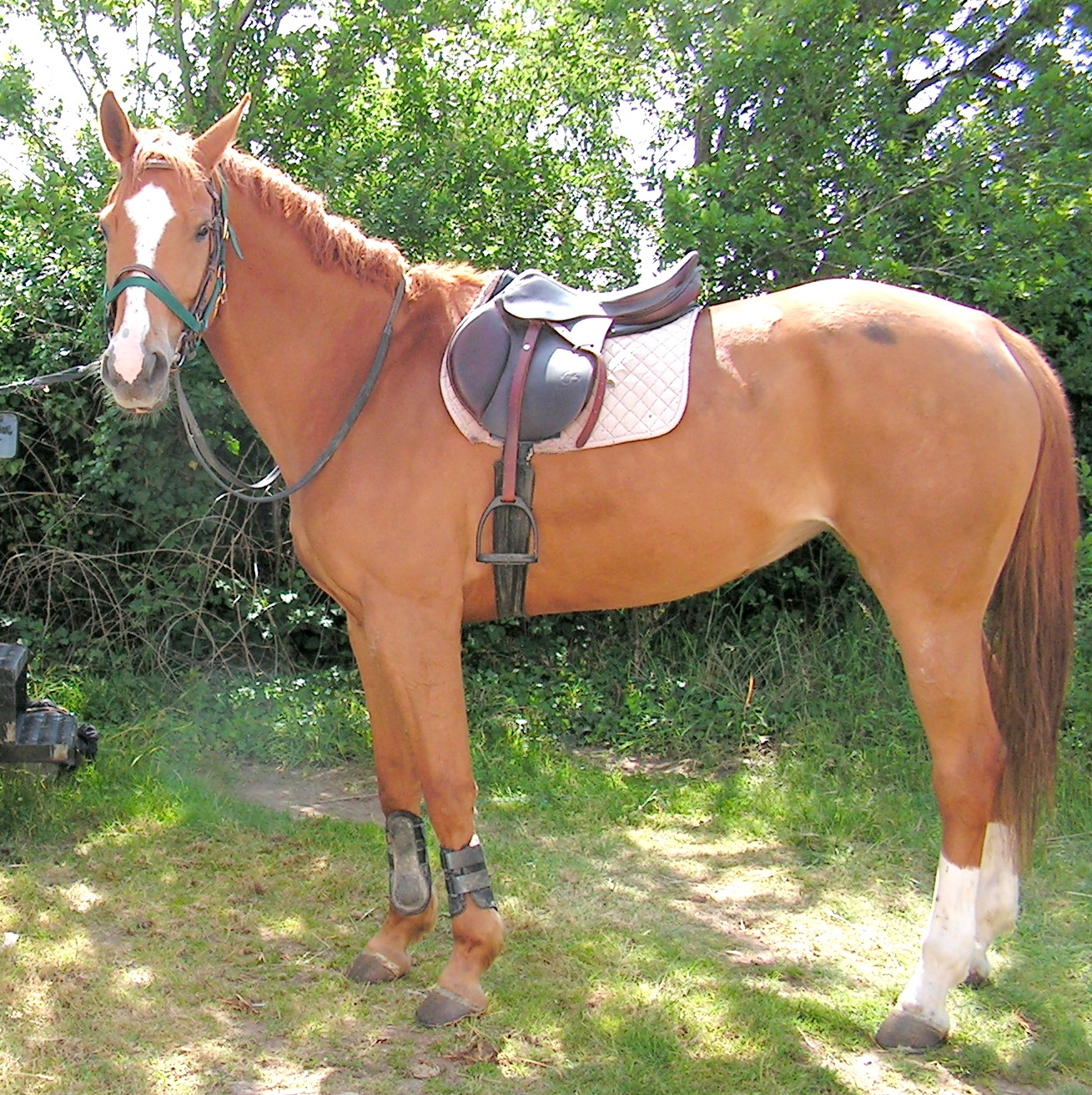

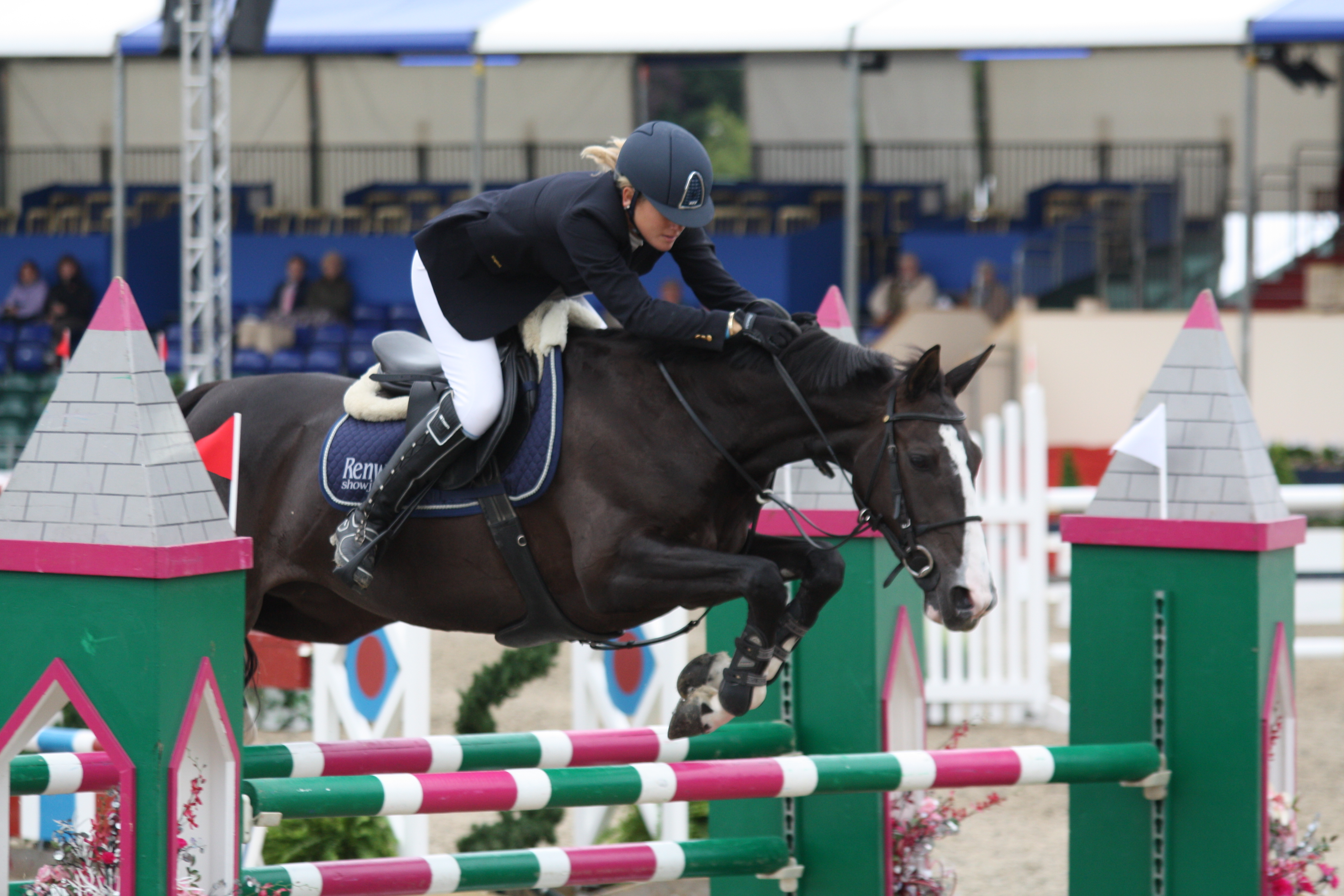
- Other names: Selle Française, Cheval de Selle Français
- Country of origin: France

Traits
- Distinguishing features: Warmblood type, show jumper

Breed standards
- Association Nationale du Selle Français – the French national organization French National Organisation

The Selle Français (SF) is a breed of sport horse from France. An athletic horse with good gaits, it is usually bay or chestnut in color. The Selle Français was created in 1958 when several French riding horse breeds were merged into one stud book. The new breed was meant to serve as a unified sport horse during a period when horses were being replaced by mechanization and were transforming into an animal used mainly for sport and leisure.

Bred throughout France, the Selle Français has been exported worldwide, with additional stud books formed in Great Britain and the United States. Horses registered with the stud books must undergo inspections which judge their conformation, gaits and performance. Horses of other breeds who pass the inspections, including those of Thoroughbred, Arabian, Anglo-Arabian and French Trotter bloodlines, may be used for breeding, with the progeny able to be registered as Selle Français.

Selle Français have proven successful at the international level of competition in many equestrian disciplines. They are most commonly seen in show jumping, eventing and dressage, although they are also seen in combined driving, equestrian vaulting and competitive trail riding competitions. Selle Français and their riders have won numerous medals in the Summer Olympics and World Equestrian Games, including making up the entire gold-medal French teams in show jumping at the 2002 World Equestrian Games and eventing at the 2004 Summer Olympics.

== Breed characteristics ==
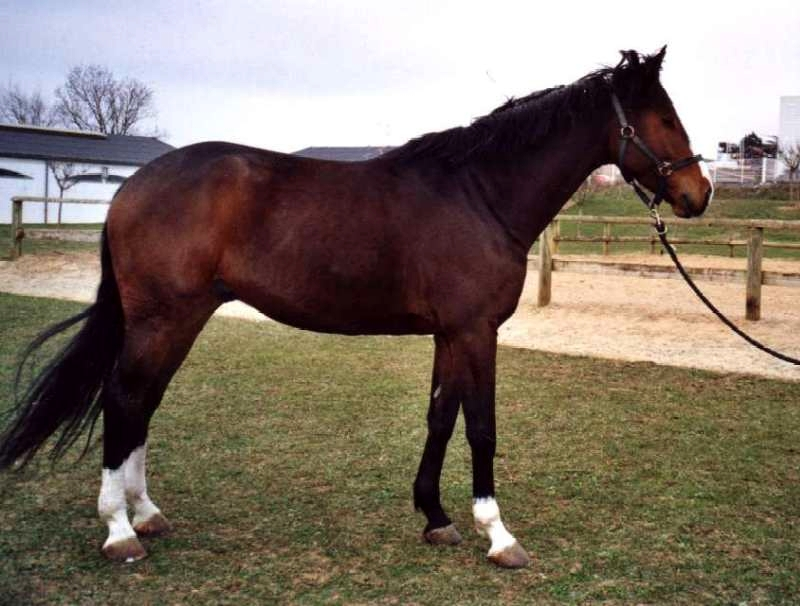
A Selle Français

Because of the diversity of the breeds that contributed to the Selle Français, there are not set breed standards. It can range from 15.1 to 17.3 hands (61 to 71 inches, 155 to 180 cm), although, because they are used as sport horses, most Selle Français usually stand a relatively tall 16.1 to 16.3 hands (65 to 67 inches, 165 to 170 cm). It is an athletic horse with balanced, harmonious and powerful gaits. Some morphological traits remain the same throughout the breed. The forehead is broad, and the facial profile is straight or convex. The neck is strong and rather long, well connected to the withers, and the back straight. The croup is elongated, muscular and slightly oblique, and the powerful hindquarters are an asset in show jumping. The chest is deep, and the shoulders long and sloping. The legs are strong and muscular with wide joints and hard hooves.

The Selle Français is generally bay or chestnut in color, the latter being a legacy of its origins in the Anglo-Norman and Limousin breeds. Gray is much less common, with its origins in the Thoroughbred and Anglo-Arabian horses that contributed to the breed. White markings, such as white on the lower legs, are fairly common within the breed, and are again inherited from its Norman ancestors. The temperament of the Selle Français is highly variable from one horse to another. This is due to the selection criteria for breeding stock, which since the beginning of the breed have been based on physical ability. In recent years, however, the ANSF and breeders have been working to create selection criteria that focus on temperament. The vast majority of Selle Français have good temperaments, quiet but energetic, patient and friendly. The breed is reputed to be intelligent and quick to learn.

== History ==
The origins of the Selle Français begin with native French horses. In 19th century Normandy, native mares were crossbred with Thoroughbred or Norfolk Trotter stallions imported to France from the United Kingdom. At least one Cleveland Bay mare was also recorded in early Selle Français pedigrees, with French-born Thoroughbred and Cleveland Bay cross mares, or Yorkshire Coach Horses, being used as foundation stock. The most common crosses were between native mares used by the military, or those bred for pulling carriages, and Thoroughbred stallions. In 1914 these types were recognized as demi-sang or "half-blood" horses. Half-blood horses were found in many French regions, and different types were usually named after the regions in which they were bred. The three main types of French saddle horses by the mid-20th century were the Anglo-Norman (bred around Caen), the demi-sang du Centre (bred around Cluny) and the Vendéen (bred around La Roche-sur-Yon).

In 1958, "Selle Français" or French Saddle Horse, was created by merging all of the regional half-blood horses in France under one name. The merged types included the Anglo-Norman, the Charolais (from the Charolles region), the Limousin (from the Limousin region), and the Vendéen. The merger was done to create a sport horse that would meet the needs of a post-World War II mechanized society where horses were used by both the French military and civilians for leisure and sport. The first Selle Français were not homogeneous in type, but offered a wide genetic diversity, due to the wide variety of local horses crossed with Thoroughbreds, Anglo-Arabians, and French Trotters. Norman origins, however, were the most widely represented, as the Anglo-Norman had been used for breeding throughout France.

Since its creation as a breed, the Selle Français has been selected solely as a sport horse. Because of this, the breed has homogenized and refined, and since its creation has been a successful competitor in international equestrian sport. In July 2003, the Association nationale du selle français (ANSF or National Association of French Saddle Horses) was approved as the breed association. The ANSF plays an advocacy role with stakeholders and partners in the equine world and ensures a proper orientation of selection and genetic improvement within the breed. Breeding of Selle Français is centered in Normandy, mainly due to its origins in Norman-related bloodlines. As of 2009, there were 7,722 farms that reported breeding activity of Selle Français, although the vast majority (around 77 percent) were very small operations with only one mare. In 2008, there were 7,638 Selle Français foals born, which made up 57 percent of the total saddle horses bred in France. In 2009, over 13,500 Selle Français mares were bred, of which 11,830 were mated to approved stallions to produce Selle Français offspring. In the same year, there were 505 active Selle Français stallions.

The Selle Français is bred throughout France and abroad, and artificial insemination plays an important role in the dissemination of the breed. The Selle Français has also contributed to several other breeds in Europe, including the Holsteiner, Zangersheide, and Oldenburger warmblood breeds. The ANSF has branches in several countries. The United Kingdom organization, called Equicours, led to the opening of a British stud book for the Selle Français, and the ANSF-US manages the stud book for the breed in the United States. Brazil, Argentina, and Morocco have agreements with the French stud book to register horses bred in those countries.

== Registration and stud book selection ==
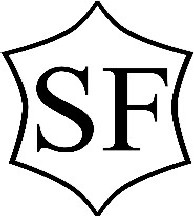
Brand of the Selle Français

The Selle Français stud book has long allowed crossbreeding with four other breeds: the Thoroughbred, Arabian, Anglo-Arabian and French Trotter. Today, restrictions exist to harmonize the stud book with directives for other European warmblood breeds. For a Selle Français to be registered, it must be from two registered Selle Français parents or from a cross between a Selle Français and a facteur de selle français (non-Selle Français horse that has passed stud book selection procedures). Stallions must pass through a selection process before their progeny is allowed to be registered as Selle Français. The process involves an approval committee that judges stallions on criteria based on the age, breed and nationality of the horses. The qualification criteria involve the conformation, gaits, performance and are scored against national indices.

Mares can be of several origins and be listed as facteur de selle français. Thoroughbred, AQPS, pure or crossbred Anglo-Arabians and French Trotting horses may also qualify under this designation, as do mares that are the product of two facteur de selle français horses. Mares belonging to other saddle horse breeds recognized by the European Union (EU) are also listed in this category. Pure and crossbred Arabians, saddle breeds not recognized by the EU and some other mares may be listed on an individual basis by performing at a high level in show jumping, three-day eventing or dressage competition. If mares come from countries or territories that do not have access to high-level competitions, they may be granted special listing status.

In 2003, the stud book was divided into two parts: a section for pure Selle Français from two registered parents and a section for horses with one facteur de selle français parent. In 2009, this distinction was abandoned and the two sections were recombined into a single stud book.

== Uses ==
The Selle Français is a French sport horse, now recognized internationally as a top breed for show jumping and three-day eventing. Selection criteria for breeding stock focuses on their jumping abilities. Show jumping is a technical sport, calling for lively and responsive yet powerful horses. Horses with more Thoroughbred blood in them have also been very competitive in three-day eventing, where speed and stamina are needed to be successful in all three portions (dressage, three-day eventing and show jumping) of the event. Thanks to these qualities, the Selle Français is seen on international show jumping and three-day eventing teams, both in France and elsewhere. In dressage, the Selle Français has gradually improved, but has faced stiff competition from northern European breeds, which often have more active gaits. In addition, many French breeders guide their horses to the more popular and profitable sport of show jumping, which sometimes deprives the dressage system of good horses. The World Breeding Federation for Sport Horses (WBFSH) ranks warmblood stud books based on their success in eventing, show jumping and dressage. In 2013, the ANSF was ranked as the 3rd best show jumping stud book in the world, topped only by the Dutch Warmblood and Belgian Warmblood breeds, and a Selle Français horse was ranked first in the world. The stud book was ranked at 6th in the world in eventing, with the top horse placed at 25th. The ANSF was ranked 19th in dressage, beaten by many of the more popular dressage breeds, including Dutch Warmbloods, Hanoverians and Westphalians.

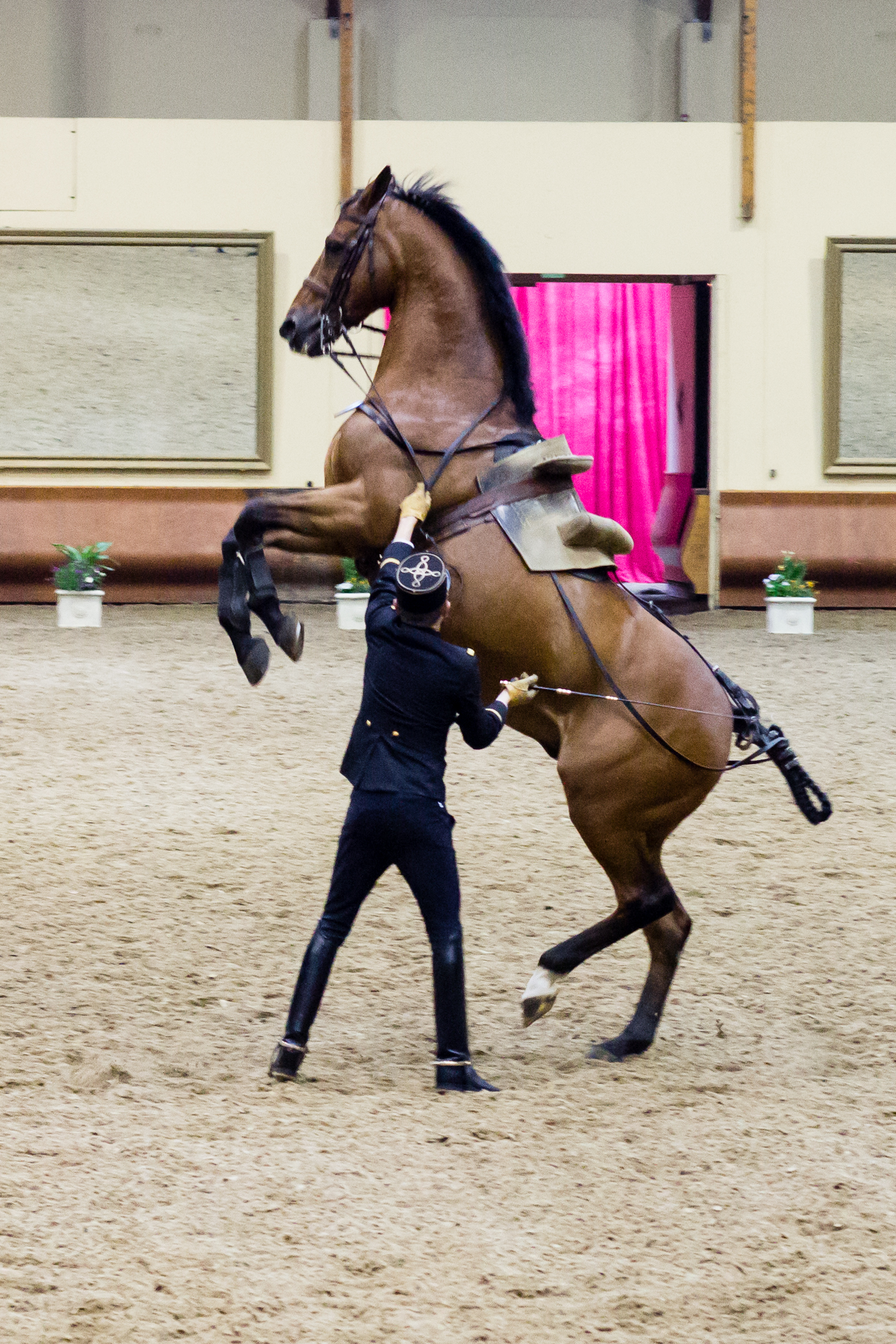
A Selle Français training for the Cadre Noir

The Institut français du cheval et de l'équitation (French Institute of Horse Riding), the École nationale d'équitation (National Equestrian School) and the Cadre Noir all use mainly Selle Français. Young horses are selected according to their skills and are trained by students within the schools. Horses representing the Cadre Noir are selected at the age of three and are trained according to their abilities, with some reaching the highest levels of haute ecole dressage. Selle Français are also used for combined driving, equestrian vaulting and competitive trail riding, and have competed at the international level in all three sports.

Selle Français are also used for the production of race horses in France. By crossbreeding them with Thoroughbred and Anglo-Arabians, horses are produced which are competitive in steeplechase (racing over obstacles). These horses are generally registered as AQPS (meaning "other than Thoroughbred") in France. The AQPS studbook in France was created in 2005; before this, some successful French racehorses, especially those raced in steeplechase races, were registered as Selle Français. These include Neptune Collonges, winner of the 2012 Grand National race, and Quevega.

== International success ==
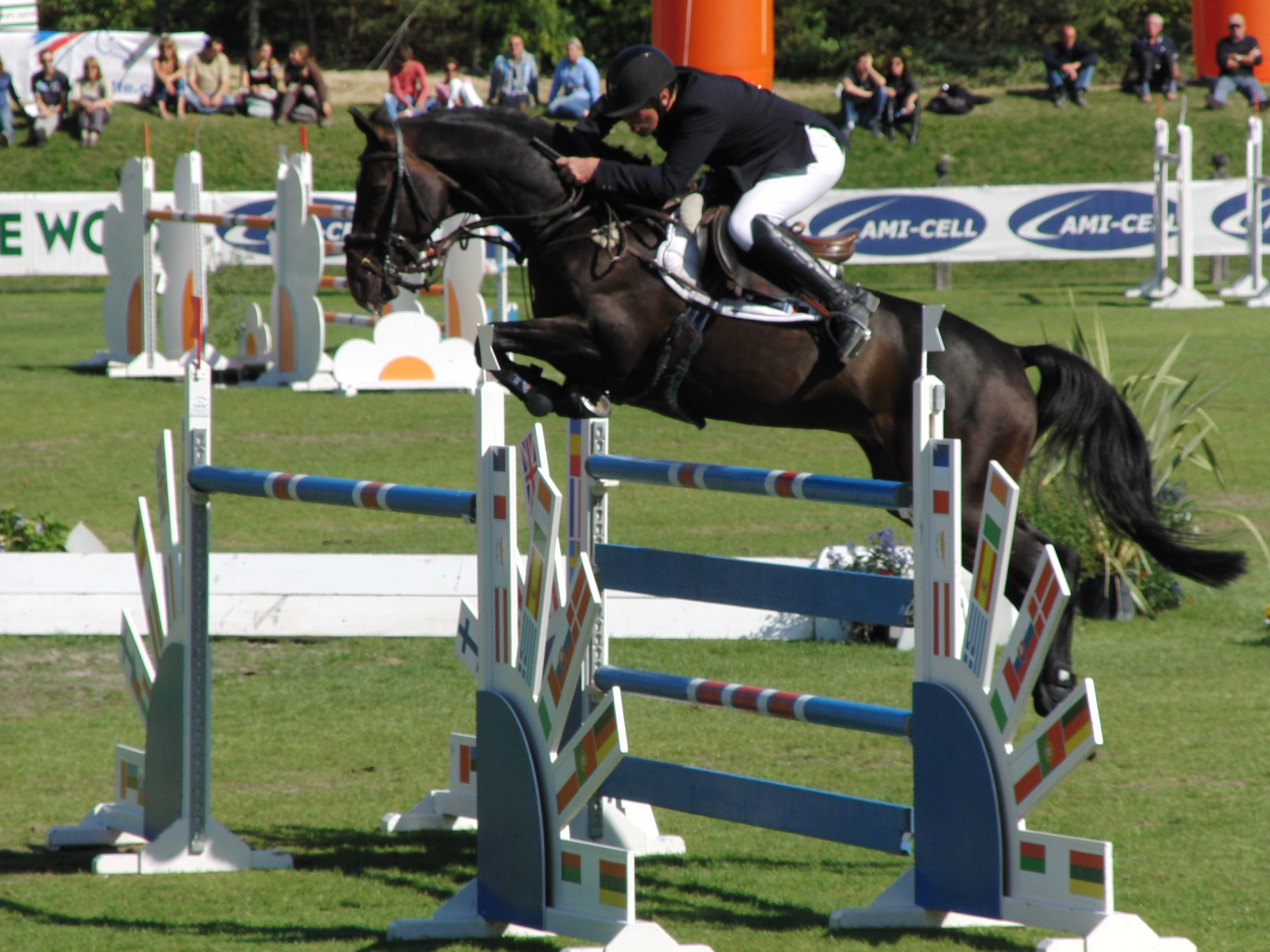
Selle Français competing in the 2010 French Show Jumping Championships

Many Selle Français compete each year in international competitions in many equestrian disciplines. Some have been particularly successful:

Almé Z (1966–1991), while not a successful international competitor himself, was a sire of huge importance to the international show jumping world. Among his numerous successful progeny were I Love You (a World Cup winner) and Galoubet A (1972–2005), part of the gold-medal winning French show-jumping team at the World Championships in 1982. Galoubet A, in turn, is known for both his competition career and the success of his offspring. He is the sire of Baloubet du Rouet (b. 1989), who with rider Rodrigo Pessoa won the gold medal at the 2004 Summer Olympics and was a three-time winner of the World Cup.

Flambeau C (b. 1971) became a pillar of the French show jumping team in the 1980s. He participated in the 1984 Summer Olympics, where he took 7th individually, and the 1988 Summer Olympics, winning the bronze medal with the French team. The 1980s also saw the rise of Jappeloup (1975–1991). A small black horse with a conformation and gaits that were considered disadvantageous for show jumping, Jappeloup was an unusual cross between a Throughbred mare and a French Trotter sire, and was registered as Selle Français. Despite this, he had an impressive jumping style, and won two French championships in 1982 and 1986, a European championship in 1987, several team medals at the European and World Championships, and a gold medal at the 1988 Summer Olympics with rider Pierre Durand, Jr.

In the 1990s, several Selle Français rose to prominence in international competition. Quidam de Revel (b. 1982), was on the French bronze medal winning show jumping team at the 1992 Summer Olympics, ridden by Hervé Godignon, and Quito de Baussy (b. 1982) was a European champion, world champion and another member of the French team in 1992, ridden by Éric Navet. Rochet Rouge (1983–2008) was a show jumping European champion in 1999 and an individual bronze medalist at the 1996 Summer Olympics. The 2000s saw Selle Français among the world leaders in both show jumping and three-day eventing. Four stallions made up the champion show jumping team at the 2002 World Equestrian Games, while four more Selle Francais made up the winning three-day event team at the 2004 Summer Olympics. In 2003, a Selle Francais became the European champion in vaulting, and another was named the world champion in competitive trail riding.

The Selle Français continued to lead international show jumping competitions in the 2010s, with Swiss rider Steve Guerdat riding a member of the breed, Nino des Buissonets, to individual gold at the 2012 Summer Olympics. More recently, Totem de Brecey (b. 2007) placed fourth in the 2019 Continental/Regional Championships Luhmühlen and was ridden by French rider Christopher Six at the 2020 Tokyo Summer Olympics.

== Notable horses ==
- Vésuve de Brekka
- Idéo du Thot
- Pégase du Mûrier

== See also ==
- List of French horse breeds
