= Dark Ronald =

British-bred Thoroughbred racehorse

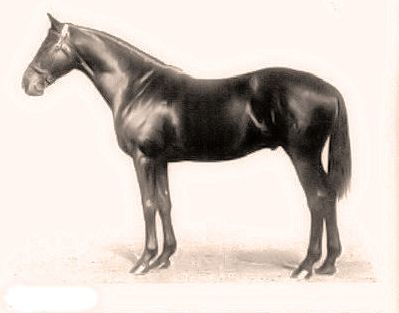
- Sire: Bay Ronald
- Grandsire: Hampton
- Dam: Darkie
- Damsire: Thurio
- Sex: Stallion
- Foaled: 1905
- Country: Great Britain
- Colour: Bay
- Breeder: Edward Kennedy
- Owner: 1. Sir Abe Bailey; 2. Burkhard von Oettingen
- Record: 7: 4-1-1
- Earnings: £8,288

Major wins
- Royal Hunt Cup (1909); Princess of Wales's Stakes (1909)

Awards
- Leading sire in Germany (1918, 1919, 1920, 1921, 1922)

Dark Ronald (1905 – 1928) was an English bred Thoroughbred racehorse and sire with a global influence on the breeding of Thoroughbreds and sport horses, with many show jumpers tracing back to him.

== Breeding ==
The sire of Dark Ronald, Bay Ronald, was a moderate handicap racehorse and a useful sire. He produced two other notable sons: Bayardo and Macdonald II. Bayardo went on to be one of the greatest runners of his time, and a sire of two English Triple Crown winners. Macdonald II was a very successful runner in France. Bay Ronald also sired the filly Rondeau, the dam of the very significant sire Teddy (that sired, among others, Athelstan, Ortello, Sir Gallahad III, Case Ace, and Sun Teddy).

His dam, Darkie, was a poor performer on the turf with only two placings, both as a two-year-old. Foaled in 1905, Dark Ronald was purchased at the Doncaster sales as a yearling for 1,300 guineas, by breeder Sir Abe Bailey.

== Racing record ==
At age two, Dark Ronald had two starts, winning his first in the five-furlong Hurst Park Foal Plate, and finishing second in the Lingfield Park Foal Plate. In the latter, he pulled up lame. Both front tendons were fired, and he was rested for two years at Sir Bailey's farm in South Africa.

Returning to England as a four-year-old, he ran in the Newbury Spring Cup, finishing unplaced. Following this, he had better success, winning the next three races in which he ran: the 10-furlong Durham Plate, the seven-furlong Royal Hunt Cup, and the 12-furlong Princess of Wales's Stakes. He finished third in his next race, the Doncaster Cup, but yet again came back lame. His owner decided to retire him for breeding.

In his seven starts, Dark Ronald had four wins and two places, and earned £8,288 (besides landing a huge bet in the Royal Hunt Cup by winning some £100,000 for his owner).

== Stud record ==
Dark Ronald first stood at Tickford Park in 1910 at a stud fee of £98 a mare. His first crop included the great racehorse and sire Son-in-Law and Ambassador IV, later sent to the United States, where he had a great influence on the American breeding industry. In his second crop, his get included Vaucluse. However, his foals were not promising, and when the German National Stud at Graditz offered the great sum of £25,000 for the stallion, his owner was happy to sell him. His final English crop, born after he was shipped overseas, included the great sire, Dark Legend, as well as Brown Prince II, and Magpie, a leading sire in Australia. Dark Ronald's English progeny won more than 70 races and £30,000.

Dark Ronald was sent to the German National stud in June 1913, having been purchased by Burkhard von Oettingen. The stud was interested not only in producing horses for the racetrack, but also for warmblood breeding. In Germany, Dark Ronald produced the excellent horses Prunus, Herold, and Wallenstein. In 1928, he died at the German National Stud, at the age of 23.

Dark Ronald was the sire of:

- Son-in-Law: sired the racehorses, Beau Pere, Foxlaw, Trimdon, Lady Juror. Very notable in warmblood breeding, his progeny included Maureen, dam of the exceptional Furioso.
- Ambassador IV: winner of the July Stakes. In America, produced several horses that were successful two-year-olds, including Constancy and St. James (great-grandsire of Nashua and To Market).
- Brown Prince II: winner of the Cambridgeshire Stakes and Jockey Club Cup. Was exported to America, where he sired Brown Bud, sire of Cinquepace. Also seen in the pedigree of Secretariat and Sir Gaylord.
- Dark Legend: sire of Duplex (winner of the Prix du Jockey Club), Fairy Legend, Mary Legend, Dark Lantern II, Dark Japan, Galatea II, Easton, Legend of France, and Rosy Legend (dam of Dante and Sayajirao).
- Herold: two-time leader of the sire list. Produced Alchimist and Arjaman (both German Derby winners).
- Magpie: placed in the Two Thousand Guineas. Exported to Australia, where he became the leading sire in 1929.
- Popingaol: dam to Pogrom (winner of the Oaks), and Book Law (winner of the St. Leger)
- Prunus: winner of Germany's Two Thousand Guineas and St. Leger, five-time leading sire in Germany. Sire of Oleander, who won 22 breeding championships.
- Vaucluse: winner of the One Thousand Guineas, dam of Bongrace (winner of Doncaster Cup)
- Wallenstein: number one on German sire list in 1930.

=== Influence on warmblood breeding ===
Dark Ronald was incredibly influential in warmblood breeding, especially in the Holstein breed. Cor de la Bryere, Lord, and Langraf I were all linebred to him. Other influential sires with Dark Ronald blood include:

- Furioso: (sire of 10 Olympic contenders in the Tokyo Games, and 30 international winners)
- Cottage Son: grandson of Dark Ronald and an influential sire in warmblood breeding
- Ladykiller xx
- Cor de la Bryère: the great jumping sire, through his sire Rantzau
- Langraf I
- Beau Pere: exported to New Zealand and later to America, he influenced the breeding of racehorses, jumpers, and eventers. Progeny include Mary Chapot’s White Lightning, Katie Monahan’s Encore, Kerry Milikin's eventer Landlady, Sundancer (two-time winner of the American Invitational), Easy Doc (a member of the Canadian equestrian team), and Turn on the Sun (part of the British equestrian team).
- Der Löwe
- Abendfrieden: great-grandson of Dark Ronald, sired the great Pik As
- Bolero: dressage stallion, sire of Brentano II, who sired Brentina and was grandsire of Poetin, foundation sire of a new B-line.
- My Babu: great racehorse sire, also sired several phenomenal eventers, including Babu Dancer, sire of Bruce Davidson's mount JJ Babu

== Sire line tree ==
Sire line Dark Ronald descendant tree
- Dark Ronald
  - Ambassador
    - St James
      - Jamestown
        - Johnstown
        - Natchez
      - Sailor Beware
  - Son-in-Law
    - The Winter King
      - Barneveldt
        - Kargal
        - Pont l'Eveque
      - King O'Connor
    - D'Orsay
      - Last Of The Dandies
        - Killballyown
    - Apron
      - Owenstown
        - Roddy Owen
    - Knight Of The Garter
    - Winalot
      - Coup de Lyon
        - Coup de Myth
      - Enfield
        - Sirius
        - Rimfire
    - Foxlaw
      - Foxhunter
        - Cacador
        - Foxlight
        - Hunters Moon
      - Foxbridge
        - Neenah
        - Exeter
        - Foxwyn
      - Tiberius
    - Comedy King
    - Diadochos
      - Oregano
        - Osiris
    - Walinson
      - Clare County
    - Ronsard
    - Son And Heir
    - Siegfried
      - Wotan
    - Constant Son
    - Tourist
      - Mantourist
      - Gadabout
      - Blakely Grove
      - Hike
      - Look Around
      - Tourist List
      - Snob Tourist
      - Timber Tourist
      - Trough Hill
      - Sightseer
      - Tourist Pride
      - Pilgrim's Way
      - Tourist Town
      - Tourist's Last
    - Empire Builder
    - Trimdon
      - Marsyas
        - Marsyad
        - Eastern Venture
        - Macip
      - Trimbush
    - Bosworth
      - Plassy
        - Vandale
      - Boswell
        - Lord Boswell
        - Round View
        - Cochise
      - Overthrow
        - Overshadow
    - Beau Pere
      - Beaupartir
      - Beau Vite
      - Beau Repaire
        - Beau Le Havre
      - Beaulivre
      - Happy Ending
      - Grand Fils
      - Beau Son
      - Mayfowl
        - Lohengrin
      - Tara King
      - Beau Chaval
      - Stepfather
      - Grandpere
      - Destino
      - Great Circle
    - Parenthesis
    - Rustom Pasha
      - Gay Boy
      - Black Out
      - Aden
      - Suspect
    - Within-The-Law
      - Caughoo
    - Young Lover
      - Cottage Son
        - Anzac
        - Consul
        - Colibri
        - Colonel
        - Conte
        - Cottage Incident
        - Corsar
    - Epigram
      - Shagreen
      - Soupi
    - Valerian
  - Brown Prince
    - Brown Bud
  - Dark Legend
    - Dark Japan
    - Dark Lantern
    - Duplex
    - Easton
      - Wildlife
    - Legend Of France
      - Gold Legend
  - Magpie
    - Graculus
    - Boaster
    - Windbag
      - Chatham
        - High Rank
        - Craigie
        - Chatspa
        - Conservator
      - Beamish Boy
    - Amounis
    - Bacchus
    - Nawallah
    - Bicolor
    - Corinax
    - Inducement
    - Karuma
    - Goshawk
    - Jacko
    - Fakenham
    - Talking
      - Amana
      - Main Topic
      - Silent
  - Prunus
    - Mah Jong
    - Oleander
      - Ebro
      - Waffenschmied
      - Ausonius
      - Sturmvogel
      - Amaranthus
      - Periander
      - Burgundy
      - Trollius
      - Marschall Vorwarts
      - Wunderhorn
        - Julianus
      - Marabou
      - Order Of The Sun
        - Wizjer
      - Samurai
        - Net Ball
      - Figaro
      - Nuvolari
        - Stani
        - Salut
      - Rinaldo
      - Erno
      - Orsenigo
        - Granet
        - Tommaso Guidi
          - Cogne
        - Falerno
        - Escorial
      - Pink Flower
        - Denikin
        - Flower Dust
        - Wilwyn
        - Olenadrin
      - Raufbold
        - Razbeg
        - Rubilnik
        - Garnir
        - Priz
        - Gaer
        - Murmansk
      - Nordlicht
      - Student
      - Filiberto
      - Honved
        - Altesch
        - Foliant
        - Granada
      - Espace Vital
      - Asterios
      - Orleans
    - Palastpage
    - Orgelton
  - Herold
    - Lupus
    - Dionys
    - Alchimist
      - Schwarzkünstler
      - Gundomar
        - Prince d'Ouilly
        - Mangon
          - Alarich
          - Baalim
        - Takt
        - Tasman
        - Baal
        - Maranon
      - Birkhahn
        - Priamos
          - Stuyvesant
        - Literat
          - Surumu
    - Arjaman
      - Wildling
        - Singlspieler
      - Olymp
  - Wallenstein
    - Alba
    - Wehr Dich
  - Axenstein
  - Traumer
  - Aditi

== Pedigree ==
Pedigree of Dark Ronald (GB), B.h. 1905
Sire Bay Ronald b. 1893	Hampton b. 1872	Lord Clifden b. 1860	Newminster
Sire Bay Ronald b. 1893	Hampton b. 1872	Lord Clifden b. 1860	The Slave
Sire Bay Ronald b. 1893	Hampton b. 1872	Lady Langden br. 1868	Kettledrum
Sire Bay Ronald b. 1893	Hampton b. 1872	Lady Langden br. 1868	Haricot
Sire Bay Ronald b. 1893	Black Duchess br. 1886	Galliard br. 1880	Galopin
Sire Bay Ronald b. 1893	Black Duchess br. 1886	Galliard br. 1880	Mavis
Sire Bay Ronald b. 1893	Black Duchess br. 1886	Black Corrie blk. 1879	Sterling
Sire Bay Ronald b. 1893	Black Duchess br. 1886	Black Corrie blk. 1879	Mare by Wild Dayrell
Dam Darkie blk. 1889	Thurio br. 1875	Cremorne b. 1869	Parmesan
Dam Darkie blk. 1889	Thurio br. 1875	Cremorne b. 1869	Rigolboche
Dam Darkie blk. 1889	Thurio br. 1875	Verona ch. 1854	Orlando
Dam Darkie blk. 1889	Thurio br. 1875	Verona ch. 1854	Iodine
Dam Darkie blk. 1889	Insignia b. 1882	Blair Athol ch. 1861	Stockwell
Dam Darkie blk. 1889	Insignia b. 1882	Blair Athol ch. 1861	Blink Bonny
Dam Darkie blk. 1889	Insignia b. 1882	Decoration br. 1873	Knight of the Garter
Dam Darkie blk. 1889	Insignia b. 1882	Decoration br. 1873	Toison D'Or (F-No.9-b)
