= Son-in-Law (horse) =

British-bred Thoroughbred racehorse

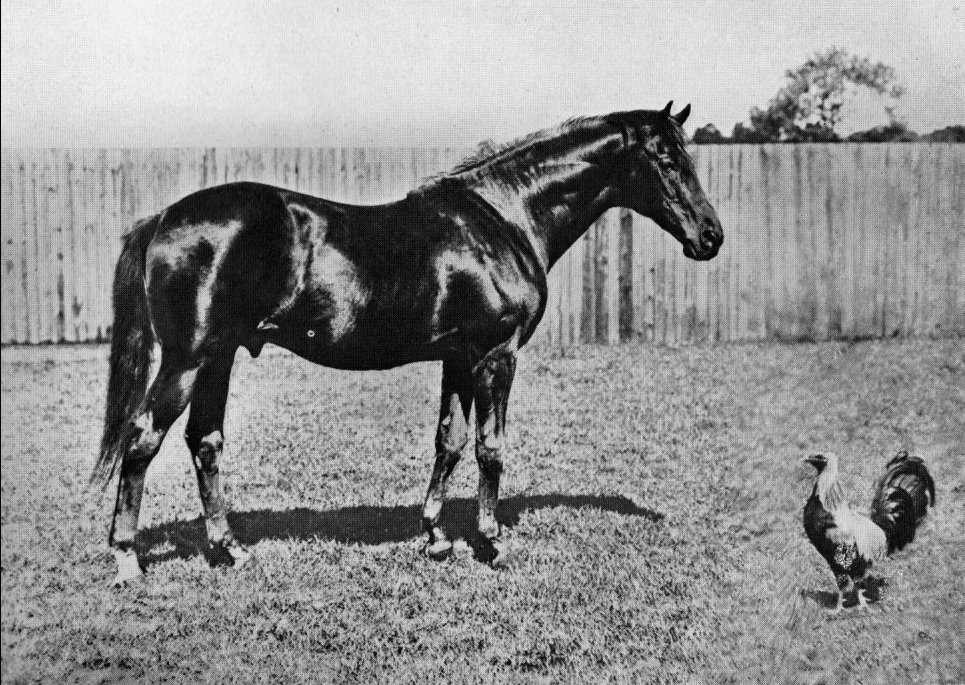
- Son-in-Law in a photograph by Frank Griggs
- Sire: Dark Ronald
- Grandsire: Bay Ronald
- Dam: Mother-in-Law
- Damsire: Matchmaker
- Sex: Stallion
- Foaled: 1911
- Country: Great Britain
- Colour: Brown
- Breeder: Sir Abe Bailey
- Owner: Sir Abe Bailey
- Record: 18: 8-1-1
- Earnings: £5,546

Major wins
- Goodwood Cup (1914); Jockey Club Cup (1914, 1915); Cesarewitch Handicap (1915)

Awards
- Leading sire in Great Britain & Ireland (1924, 1930)
- Last updated on 26 July 2007

Son-in-Law (22 April 1911 – 15 May 1941) was a British Thoroughbred racehorse and an influential sire, especially for sport horses.

The National Horseracing Museum says Son-in-Law is "probably the best and most distinguished stayer this country has ever known."

Described as "one of the principal influences for stamina in the modern thoroughbred" in Ulbrich's Peerage of Racehorses, Son-in-Law is seen in the pedigree of many of the top 100 show jumpers, particularly those of Holstein heritage.

In 1924 and 1930, Son-in-Law was the leading sire in Great Britain and Ireland. His progeny include:

- Foxlaw (1922-1935) - won 1927 Ascot Gold Cup
- Straitlace (f. 1921) - won 1924 Epsom Oaks, Coronation Stakes
- Rustom Pasha - extremely important sire in Argentina
- Suzerain (f. 1933) - third in 1937 Jockey Club Cup, Doncaster Cup
- Trimdon (f. 1926) - won 1931-32 Ascot Gold Cup

== Sire line tree ==
Descendants of Son-in-Law (click to show)
- Son-in-Law
  - The Winter King
    - Barneveldt
      - Kargal
      - Pont l'Eveque
        - Cabure
    - King O'Connor
  - D'Orsay
    - Last Of The Dandies
      - Killballyown
  - Apron
    - Owenstown
      - Roddy Owen
  - Knight Of The Garter
  - Winalot
    - Coup de Lyon
      - Coup de Myth
        - What A Myth
    - Enfield
      - Sirius
      - Rimfire
  - Foxlaw
    - Foxhunter
      - Cacador
        - Hunters Fort
          - V V Hunters Level
      - Foxlight
        - Rantzau
      - Hunters Moon
        - Neji
        - Sun Dog
        - Mountain Dew
    - Foxbridge
      - Neenah
      - Exeter
      - Foxwyn
    - Tiberius
  - Comedy King
  - Diadochos
    - Oregano
      - Osiris
        - Jacko
  - Walinson
    - Clare County
  - Ronsard
  - Son And Heir
  - Siegfried
    - Wotan
  - Constant Son
  - Tourist
    - Mantourist
    - Gadabout
    - Blakely Grove
    - Hike
    - Look Around
    - Tourist List
    - Snob Tourist
    - Timber Tourist
    - Trough Hill
    - Sightseer
    - Tourist Pride
    - Pilgrim's Way
    - Tourist Town
    - Tourist's Last
  - Empire Builder
  - Trimdon
    - Marsyas
      - Marsyad
      - Eastern Venture
        - Woodland Venture
      - Macip
    - Trimbush
  - Bosworth
    - Plassy
      - Vandale
        - Herbager
        - Braccio da Montone
        - Accrale
          - Ardale
        - Chic Type
    - Boswell
      - Lord Boswell
      - Round View
      - Cochise
    - Overthrow
      - Overshadow
  - Beau Pere
    - Beaupartir
    - Beau Vite
    - Beau Repaire
      - Beau Le Havre
    - Beaulivre
    - Happy Ending
    - Grand Fils
    - Beau Son
    - Mayfowl
      - Lohengrin
    - Tara King
    - Beau Chaval
    - Stepfather
    - Grandpere
    - Destino
    - Great Circle
  - Parenthesis
  - Rustom Pasha
    - Gay Boy
    - Black Out
    - Aden
    - Suspect
  - Within-The-Law
    - Caughoo
  - Young Lover
    - Cottage Son
      - Anzac
      - Consul
        - Granat
        - Joost
      - Colibri
      - Colonel
        - Grand Vikar
          - Capitano
            - Capitol
              - Dobel's Cento
      - Conte
      - Cottage Incident
      - Corsar
  - Epigram
    - Shagreen
    - Soupi
  - Valerian
