= Bay Ronald =

British-bred Thoroughbred racehorse

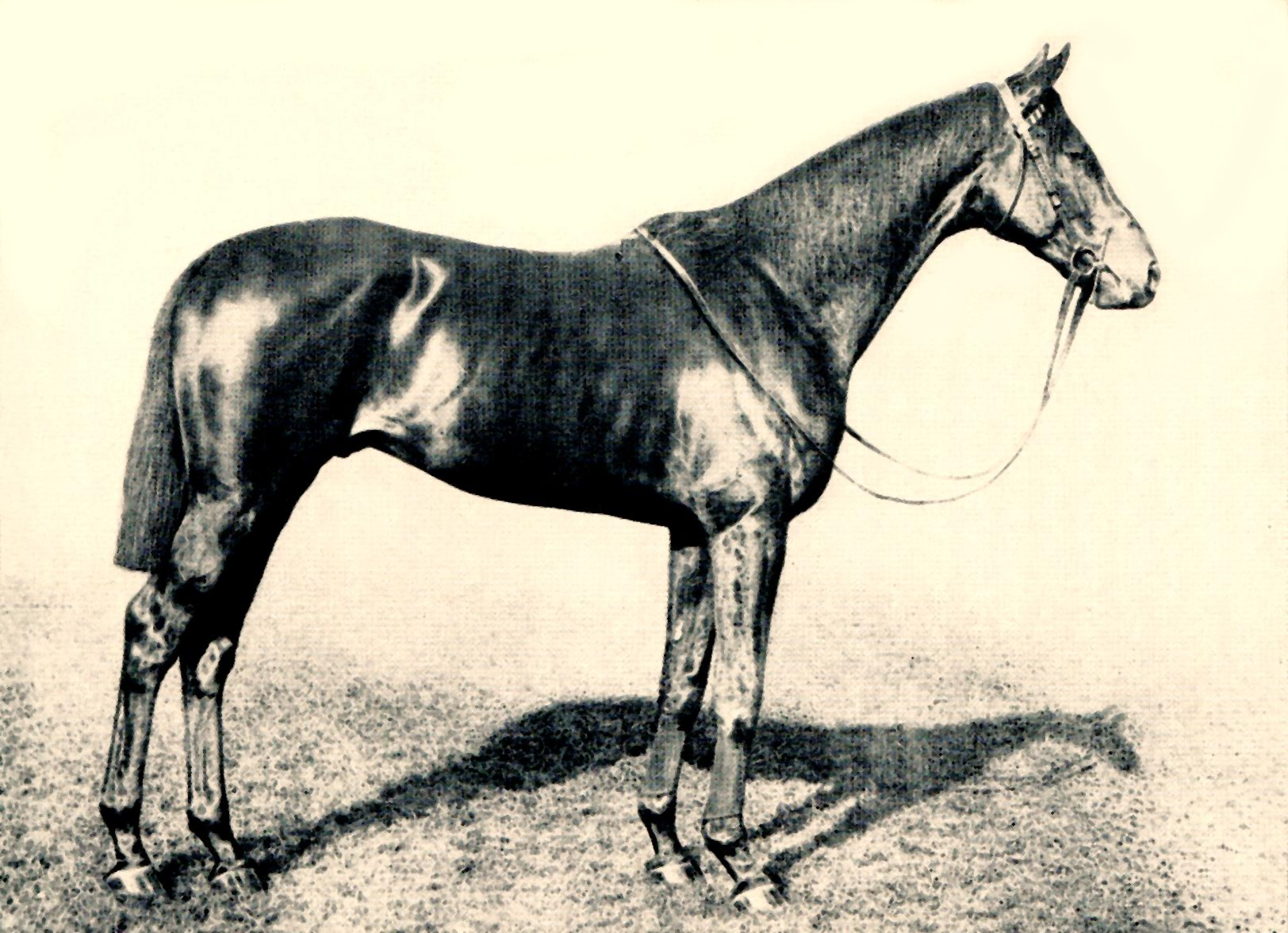
- Sire: Hampton
- Grandsire: Lord Clifden
- Dam: Black Duchess
- Damsire: Galliard
- Sex: Stallion
- Foaled: 1893
- Country: Great Britain
- Colour: Bay
- Breeder: Mr. T. Phillips
- Owner: Sir Leonard Brassey
- Trainer: Tom Jennings, Jr.
- Record: 26: 5–1–2
- Earnings: £6,443

Major wins
- Limekiln Stakes (1896); Lowther Stakes (1896); Hardwicke Stakes (1897); City and Suburban Handicap (1898); Epsom Gold Cup (1898)

Bay Ronald (foaled 3 May 1893) was a Thoroughbred racehorse that had a huge impact on the breeding of sport horses, mainly through his son Dark Ronald and grandson Teddy, and also carried on his lines in the Thoroughbred racing world, through his son Bayardo. He appears in the pedigrees of many dressage, show jumping, and eventing horses today.

== Breeding ==
The sire of Bay Ronald, Hampton, also sired four classic winners: Ayrshire, Merry Hampton, Reve d'Or, and Ladas (who won The Derby). His dam Black Duchess only won one small race, but she did produce Black Cherry who was the dam of Cherry Lass (1,000 Guineas and Epsom Oaks), Blanche (the dam of Blandford) and Jean's Folly (dam of Night Hawk, winner of the St Leger). Bay Ronald's dam-sire, Galliard, won the 2,000 Guineas.

Bay Ronald was foaled on 3 May 1893 at Leybourne Grange Stud in Kent, England.

== Racing career ==
As a two-year-old, Bay Ronald started five times, finishing third in one race. As a three-year-old, he started eight times, winning two races: the Limekiln Stakes (one mile) and the Lowther Stakes (1½ miles) held at Newmarket Racecourse. He finished fifth behind Persimmon in The Derby after disputing the lead until the last two furlongs.

At four, he had one win out of six starts, at the 1½ mile Hardwicke Stakes. He also placed second at the Champion Stakes, and third in the Eclipse Stakes. As a five-year-old he improved slightly, winning two out of seven starts: the City and Suburban Handicap (1¼ miles) and the Epsom Gold Cup, carrying 132 pounds. Urged by thus success, his owner decided to enter him in the 2½ mile Ascot Gold Cup. However, the distance was too great, and he did not finish well. Despite this, Bay Ronald came out the next day to place second in the Hardwicke Stakes. The 1889 season was to be his last on the track.

Bay Ronald had a moderate racing career. In his 26 starts he won five times and placed three times. He was retired to stud having won £6,443.

== Stud record ==
Bay Ronald first stood at Preston Farm in 1899. Due to his rather unimpressive record, his stud fee for the first season was 25 guineas, and free to mares who had already produced winners. During his time at stud in England, he bred few mares—less than 20 each year—and they were generally of poor quality. Later, his stud fee would reach 100 guineas.

Five of his first crop of foals went on to win as two-year-olds. His second crop included the Rous Memorial Stakes winner, Wild Oats, and six other winners. One of these winners was MacDonald II, a colt out of a French mare, who went on to be quite successful.

Bay Ronald's third crop, who began racing in 1905, were less impressive. However, it was at this time that his son, MacDonald II, began to show his talent. He left behind his fourth crop, including then-yearling Dark Ronald, and fifth crop, which produced his son, Bayardo, when he left for Cheri Halbronn's stud. Bay Ronald was placed second and third on the sires list before being sold for £5,000 to France.

In France, Bay Ronald produced some good horses, including Combourg, Greffulhe, Fidia and also Rondeau, the dam of the influential Teddy.

Bay Ronald tended to pass on his stoutness. He was the most influential of the Hampton sons, and his offspring continued the Hampton sire line.

=== Progeny ===
- Bayardo: 22 wins out of 25 starts, including the St. Leger Stakes, Champion Stakes, Limekiln Stakes and Ascot Gold Cup. Sired the filly Bayuda (winner of The Oaks), and sires two English triple crown winners: Gay Crusader and Gainsborough.
- Combourg: won the Prix Royal-Oak and the Prix du Cadran
- Dark Ronald: a very influential son of Bay Ronald, sire of Son-in-Law, who is found in the pedigrees of many top sport horses in the world today.
- Fidia: won the Gran Premio di Milano (Italy)
- Greffulhe: won the Prix Noailles
- Macdonald II: winner of the Prix de Sablonville, the Prix du Conseil Municipal, the Prix Royal-Oak, the Fürstenberg-Rennen (Germany), and two-time winner of the Prix Boiard. Finished second in the Prix du Jockey Club. Sired As d'Atout (winner of the Grand Prix de Paris).
- Rondeau: dam of the stallion Teddy, who was very influential in Germany, France, Britain, the US, and Italy.
- Many other fillies by Dark Ronald went on to notable success.

=== Sport horse breeding ===
Bay Ronald had the greatest influence on the sport horse breeding industry through his son Dark Ronald and grandson Teddy. Overall, the number of top sport horses who feature him in their lineage is spectacular. He is especially prominent in sport horses of thoroughbred breeding, such as many of the top eventers.

Teddy is seen in the pedigrees of Matcho AA, and eventers Dr. Peaches, and The Gray Goose.

Dark Ronald is seen in the pedigrees of World Cup I, and his brothers, the Hanoverian Werther (in which Dark Ronald appears twice), the great Pik As, Valentino xx, Waidmannsdank xx, Lord, Son-in-Law (great grand-sire to Cottage Son), and Ladykiller xx (who has had a fantastic influence on the Holstein breed). Cor de la Bryere and Landgraf I were also linebred to him. Dark Ronald is also featured in the pedigrees of Furioso, Beau Pere (progeny include international jumpers White Lightning and Encore (winner of the Grand Prix at Fontainebleau and a USET team member), eventer Landlady, two-time American invitational winner Sundancer, Canadian equestrian team member Easy Doc, and British equestrian team member Turn on the Sun), Der Loewe (in the pedigree of such horses as Salinero, Arko, and Brentina), and dressage stallion Bolero (sire of Brentano II, grand-sire of Poetin and Brentina). Top eventers with Dark Ronald include Shear Leau and Bally Cor (both through Son-in-Law).

Through his son Bayardo, Bay Ronald also had an influence on sport horse breeding. Bayardo produced English Triple Crown winner Gainsborough, who sired the small colt Hyperion. Hyperion is found in the pedigrees of many sport horses, including the show jumpers Carling King, Jet Run, Pan American silver medalist A Little Bit, Encore (who also went back to Bay Ronald through Dark Ronald), Canadian equestrian team horse Stoic, Anne Kursinski's jumper Eros, and USET jumper Aberali. Hyperion's dressage offspring include Pion, and the influential sire Lauries Crusador (who produced 2000 World Young Dressage Horse Champion Laurentianer, and Londonderry, winner of the jumping class for 4-year-olds at the 1999 at the Bundeschampionate). He is also in the pedigree of eventers Charisma, Winsome Adante, Eagle Lion, Biko, and Sandrift, and the great sire of eventers Ben Faerie (sire of Priceless and Walk on Star, dam-sire of Primmore's Pride).

Both Bayardo and Teddy are seen in the pedigrees of many horses, many times through the stallion Djebel. These horses include Bolero (sire of Brentano II, Brentina, and many others) and My Babu (grandsire of eventer JJ Babu and many others). Bayardo and Teddy are also seen in the pedigree of Might Tango. Both Dark Ronald and Teddy are seen in the pedigree of Donnerwetter (the sire of the enormously influential Donnerhall) as well as the influential stallion Rantzau.

All three are seen in the pedigree of the great eventer Prince Panache (through Son-in-Law and My Babu), and the pedigree of Tamarillo has Bay Ronald featured almost 30 times, mostly through Bayardo and Teddy, but also through Dark Ronald and Macdonald.

== Sire line tree ==
Descendants of Bay Ronald (click to show)
- Bay Ronald
  - Wild Oats
  - MacDonald
    - As d'Atout
    - Oreg Lak
    - McKinley
  - Bayardo
    - Gay Crusader
      - Bright Knight
        - Gallant Knight
      - Hurstwood
      - Caissot
        - Intermezzo
      - Gay Lothario
      - Hot Night
      - Kincardine
        - Kindergarten
      - Inglesant
      - Medieval Knight
    - Gainsborough
      - Murillo
      - Solario
        - Dastur
        - Tai-Yang
        - Raeburn
        - Sind
        - Mid-day Sun
        - Foroughi
        - Sadri
        - King's Approach
        - Nicolaus
        - Shapoor
        - Straight Deal
      - Tournesol
        - Isao
        - Wakataka
        - Osis
        - Tsukitoki
        - Tsukiyasu
        - Dynamo
        - Iwa Kabuto
        - Tokumasa
        - Adzuma Dake
        - Kyokujitsu
        - Kumohata
        - Tokino Chikara
        - Ieryu
        - Kuretake
        - Kuri Yamato
      - Artist Glow
      - Sir Nigel
        - Sirlan
        - Sir Fellah
      - Artist's Proof
        - Fine Art
      - Costaki Pasha
      - Le Voleur
      - Lansdowne
        - Land's Corner
      - Ramses II
        - Red Rower
      - Singapore
        - Chulmleigh
        - Skoiter
        - Arco
      - Goyescas
      - Orwell
        - Rosewell
      - Hyperion
        - Half Crown
        - Admiral's Walk
        - Casanova
        - Heliopolis
        - His Highness
        - Hypnotist
        - Quick Ray
        - Helios
        - Hippius
        - Stardust
        - Alibhai
        - Devonian
        - Orthodox
        - Owen Tudor
        - Selim Hassan
        - Sol Oriens
        - Sun Castle
        - Hyacinthus
        - Hyperides
        - Sun King
        - Deimos
        - Coastal Traffic
        - Pensive
        - Red Mars
        - Rockafella
        - Ruthless
        - Greek Star
        - High Peak
        - Aldis Lamp
        - Gulf Stream
        - Khaled
        - Radiotherapy
        - Sky High
        - Empyrean
        - Hyperbole
        - Babu's Pet
        - Rolled Gold
        - Aristophanes
        - Hylander
        - Judicate
        - Aureole
        - Gun Shot
        - High Veldt
        - Hornbeam
        - Ommeyad
        - High Hat
        - Zenith
      - Bobsleigh
        - Oxo
      - Emborough
        - Bernborough
      - Artist's Son
        - Durlas Eile
      - Winterhalter
    - Lord Basil
    - Manilardo
    - Allenby
    - Manton
      - Fagas
      - Harpagon
      - Wagram
    - The Ace
  - Fidia
  - Combourg
  - Dark Ronald
    - Ambassador
      - St James
        - Jamestown
        - Sailor Beware
    - Son-in-Law
      - The Winter King
        - Barneveldt
        - King O'Connor
      - D'Orsay
        - Last Of The Dandies
      - Apron
        - Owenstown
      - Knight Of The Garter
      - Winalot
        - Coup de Lyon
        - Enfield
      - Foxlaw
        - Foxhunter
        - Foxbridge
        - Tiberius
      - Comedy King
      - Diadochos
        - Oregano
      - Walinson
        - Clare County
      - Ronsard
      - Son And Heir
      - Siegfried
        - Wotan
      - Constant Son
      - Tourist
        - Mantourist
        - Gadabout
        - Blakely Grove
        - Hike
        - Look Around
        - Tourist List
        - Snob Tourist
        - Timber Tourist
        - Trough Hill
        - Sightseer
        - Tourist Pride
        - Pilgrim's Way
        - Tourist Town
        - Tourist's Last
      - Empire Builder
      - Trimdon
        - Marsyas
        - Trimbush
      - Bosworth
        - Plassy
        - Boswell
        - Overthrow
      - Beau Pere
        - Beaupartir
        - Beau Vite
        - Beau Repaire
        - Beaulivre
        - Happy Ending
        - Grand Fils
        - Beau Son
        - Mayfowl
        - Tara King
        - Beau Chaval
        - Stepfather
        - Grandpere
        - Destino
        - Great Circle
      - Parenthesis
      - Rustom Pasha
        - Gay Boy
        - Black Out
        - Aden
        - Suspect
      - Within-The-Law
        - Caughoo
      - Young Lover
        - Cottage Son
      - Epigram
        - Shagreen
        - Soupi
      - Valerian
    - Brown Prince
      - Brown Bud
    - Dark Legend
      - Dark Japan
      - Dark Lantern
      - Duplex
      - Easton
        - Wildlife
      - Legend Of France
        - Gold Legend
    - Magpie
      - Graculus
      - Boaster
      - Windbag
        - Chatham
        - Beamish Boy
      - Amounis
      - Bacchus
      - Nawallah
      - Bicolor
      - Corinax
      - Inducement
      - Karuma
      - Goshawk
      - Jacko
      - Fakenham
      - Talking
        - Amana
        - Main Topic
        - Silent
    - Prunus
      - Mah Jong
      - Oleander
        - Ebro
        - Waffenschmied
        - Ausonius
        - Sturmvogel
        - Amaranthus
        - Periander
        - Burgundy
        - Trollius
        - Marschall Vorwarts
        - Wunderhorn
        - Marabou
        - Order Of The Sun
        - Samurai
        - Figaro
        - Nuvolari
        - Rinaldo
        - Erno
        - Orsenigo
        - Pink Flower
        - Raufbold
        - Nordlicht
        - Student
        - Filiberto
        - Honved
        - Espace Vital
        - Asterios
        - Orleans
      - Palastpage
      - Orgelton
    - Herold
      - Lupus
      - Dionys
      - Alchimist
        - Schwarzkünstler
        - Gundomar
        - Birkhahn
      - Arjaman
        - Wildling
        - Olymp
    - Wallenstein
      - Alba
      - Wehr Dich
    - Axenstein
    - Traumer
    - Aditi

== Pedigree ==
Pedigree of Bay Ronald, bay stallion, 1893
Sire Hampton b. 1872	Lord Clifden b. 1860	Newminster b. 1848	Touchstone
Sire Hampton b. 1872	Lord Clifden b. 1860	Newminster b. 1848	Beeswing
Sire Hampton b. 1872	Lord Clifden b. 1860	The Slave b. 1852	Melbourne
Sire Hampton b. 1872	Lord Clifden b. 1860	The Slave b. 1852	Volley
Sire Hampton b. 1872	Lady Langden br. 1868	Kettledrum ch. 1858	Rataplan
Sire Hampton b. 1872	Lady Langden br. 1868	Kettledrum ch. 1858	Hybla
Sire Hampton b. 1872	Lady Langden br. 1868	Haricot br. 1847	Lanercost
Sire Hampton b. 1872	Lady Langden br. 1868	Haricot br. 1847	Queen Mary
Dam Black Duchess br. 1886	Galliard b. 1880	Galopin b. 1872	Vedette
Dam Black Duchess br. 1886	Galliard b. 1880	Galopin b. 1872	Flying Duchess
Dam Black Duchess br. 1886	Galliard b. 1880	Mavis ch. 1874	Macaroni
Dam Black Duchess br. 1886	Galliard b. 1880	Mavis ch. 1874	Merlette
Dam Black Duchess br. 1886	Black Corrie blk. 1879	Sterling b. 1868	Oxford
Dam Black Duchess br. 1886	Black Corrie blk. 1879	Sterling b. 1868	Whisper
Dam Black Duchess br. 1886	Black Corrie blk. 1879	Wild Dayrell mare b. 1861	Wild Dayrell
Dam Black Duchess br. 1886	Black Corrie blk. 1879	Wild Dayrell mare b. 1861	Lady Lurewell
