= Dobel's Cento =

Showjumping horse

- Breed: Holsteiner
- Sire: Capitol I
- Grandsire: Capitano
- Dam: Viola XL
- Maternal grandsire: Caletto II
- Sex: Stallion
- Foaled: 1 March 1989; Büsum, Germany
- Died: 5 February 2018 (aged 28); Sendenhorst, Germany
- Country: Germany
- Colour: Grey
- Breeder: Heinrich Schoof

Olympic medal record

Equestrian
Gold medal – first place	2000 Sydney	Team Jumping
Bronze medal – third place	2004 Athens	Team Jumping

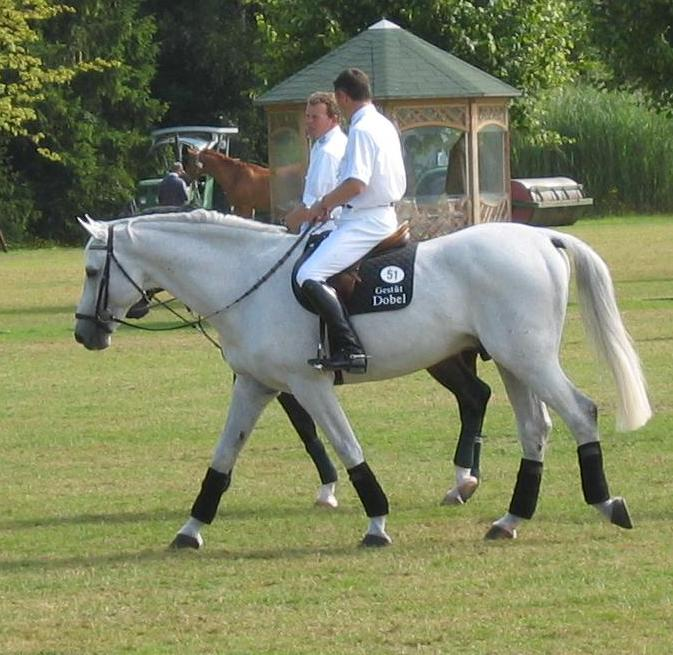
Otto Becker und Lars Nieberg

Dobel's Cento (1 March 1989 – 5 February 2018) was a horse who competed in International Grand Prix show jumping competitions. He stood at 16.3½ hh (171 cm) and was an approved stud for Oldenburg, Rhinelander and Belgian Warmblood.

With German rider Otto Becker, the stallion won medals in the 2000 and 2004 Summer Olympic Games. He was bred by Heinrich Schoof of Büsum, Germany, and spent 11 years competing with Otto Becker. He was retired at age 17 in 2006. During his show career, Dobel's Cento won €1,026,188 in international competition.

Dobel's Cento was euthanized after contracting pneumonia at age 28.

== Achievements ==
- HLP reserve winner with 133 points
- 7-year-old winner of the International stallions show jumping (France)
- Winner of the Western European League in 2000
- Winner of the Aachen Grand Prix in 2000
- Team Gold Medal in Sydney in 2000 and 4th place individually
- Winner of the World Cup Final in 2002
- Horse of the year 2002-2003
- Team European Champion 2003
- Winner of the "Grand Prize" of Spruce Meadows (Canada) in 2004
- Winner of the Team Bronze medal in Athens in 2004

Pedigree of Dobel's Cento
Sire Capitol I, Holst gr. 1975 17.0 hh	Capitano, Holst gr. 1968 16.0 hh	Corporal, Holst dk b. 1963 16.0½ hh	Cottage Son, xx br. 1944 16.0½ hh
Sire Capitol I, Holst gr. 1975 17.0 hh	Capitano, Holst gr. 1968 16.0 hh	Corporal, Holst dk b. 1963 16.0½ hh	Gimara 1948
Sire Capitol I, Holst gr. 1975 17.0 hh	Capitano, Holst gr. 1968 16.0 hh	Retina, Holst gr. 1952 16.1 hh	Ramzes, AA gr. 1937 16.1½ hh
Sire Capitol I, Holst gr. 1975 17.0 hh	Capitano, Holst gr. 1968 16.0 hh	Retina, Holst gr. 1952 16.1 hh	Dolli
Sire Capitol I, Holst gr. 1975 17.0 hh	Folia br. 1969 16.1½ hh	Maximus gr. 16.0 hh	Manometer; 1953 16.0 hh
Sire Capitol I, Holst gr. 1975 17.0 hh	Folia br. 1969 16.1½ hh	Maximus gr. 16.0 hh	Stoer
Sire Capitol I, Holst gr. 1975 17.0 hh	Folia br. 1969 16.1½ hh	Vase gr. 1961 16.0 hh	Ramzes, AA gr. 1937 16.1½ hh
Sire Capitol I, Holst gr. 1975 17.0 hh	Folia br. 1969 16.1½ hh	Vase gr. 1961 16.0 hh	Rappel; 1938
Dam Viola XI, Holst	Caletto II, Holst dk b. 1978 16.2½ hh	Cor de la Bryére, SF, Holst dk b. 1968 16.1½ hh	Rantzau xx
Dam Viola XI, Holst	Caletto II, Holst dk b. 1978 16.2½ hh	Cor de la Bryére, SF, Holst dk b. 1968 16.1½ hh	Quenotte, SF b. 1960 16.3 hh
Dam Viola XI, Holst	Caletto II, Holst dk b. 1978 16.2½ hh	Deka, Holst b. 1967 16.2 hh	Consul, Holst b. 1960 16. hh
Dam Viola XI, Holst	Caletto II, Holst dk b. 1978 16.2½ hh	Deka, Holst b. 1967 16.2 hh	Oekonomie 1955
Dam Viola XI, Holst	Lady Legend b. 1974	Liguster b. 1970 16.1½ hh	Landsturm b. 1966 16.1½ hh
Dam Viola XI, Holst	Lady Legend b. 1974	Liguster b. 1970 16.1½ hh	Aumina b.
Dam Viola XI, Holst	Lady Legend b. 1974	Legende b. 1958	Löwenjäger; 1943
Dam Viola XI, Holst	Lady Legend b. 1974	Legende b. 1958	Echta
