= Wahnfried (disambiguation) =

Wahnfried is Richard Wagner's villa in Bayreuth, Germany.

Wahnfried may also refer to:

- Richard Wahnfried (now simply "Wahnfried"), an alias for German composer and musician Klaus Schulze
- Wahnfried (film), a 1986 film about Wagner
- Sire of Der Löwe (1944–1973), a German Thoroughbred stallion
