= Ossie Phillips =

Australian jockey

Ossie Phillips (born in Victoria) was an Australian jockey, who was best known for riding Wotan to victory in the 1936 Melbourne Cup.
