= The Pearl (horse) =

Australian-bred Thoroughbred racehorse

- Sire: New Warrior (GB)
- Grandsire: Pyrrhus The First (GB)
- Dam: Ida (AUS)
- Damsire: Vanguard (AUS)
- Sex: Stallion
- Foaled: 1866
- Country: Australia
- Colour: Bay
- Owner: John Tait
- Trainer: John Tait
- Record: 23: 2-3-3

Major wins
- Melbourne Cup (1871)
- Last updated on 1 November 2018

The Pearl was an Australian bred Thoroughbred racehorse that won the 1871 Melbourne Cup by two lengths.

The Pearl is the equal biggest price winner of the Cup at odds of 100/1. Other winners at these odds were Wotan (1936), Old Rowley (1940) and Prince of Penzance (2015).
