= Calvaro V =

Horse (1986–2003)

- Breed: Holsteiner
- Sire: Cantus
- Dam: Valetta VI
- Foaled: 1986; Klein Offenseth-Sparrieshoop, Germany
- Died: 1 October 2003 (aged 16–17); Neuendorf, Switzerland
- Country: Switzerland
- Colour: Gray
- Rider: Wilhelm Melliger

Earnings
- 2 million CHF

Calvaro V (1986 – 1 October 2003) was a grey Holsteiner gelding sired in 1986. Competing in show jumping events with his Swiss rider Willi Melliger, Calvaro won two Olympic silver medals (1996, 2000) and four world championship medals. Standing tall for a jumper at 18.1 hands (73 inches, 185 cm), Calvaro accrued a total of nearly SFr 2 million in winnings.

After suffering a knee injury in 2001, Calvaro was retired to Melliger's stud farm in Neuendorf, Switzerland, in 2002. His health rapidly declined, and he died in September 2003. Prior to the horse's death, Melliger allowed him to be cloned.

== Pedigree ==
Pedigree of Calvaro V
Sire Cantus 1981 Holsteiner	Caletto I 1975 Holsteiner	Cor de la Bryere; 1968 Selle Français A	Rantzau
Sire Cantus 1981 Holsteiner	Caletto I 1975 Holsteiner	Cor de la Bryere; 1968 Selle Français A	Quenotte
Sire Cantus 1981 Holsteiner	Caletto I 1975 Holsteiner	Deka; 1967 Holsteiner	Consul
Sire Cantus 1981 Holsteiner	Caletto I 1975 Holsteiner	Deka; 1967 Holsteiner	Oekonomie
Sire Cantus 1981 Holsteiner	Monoline; Holsteiner	Roman; 1960 Holsteiner	Ramzès
Sire Cantus 1981 Holsteiner	Monoline; Holsteiner	Roman; 1960 Holsteiner	Dorette
Sire Cantus 1981 Holsteiner	Monoline; Holsteiner	Usa; 1960 Holsteiner	Marabu II
Sire Cantus 1981 Holsteiner	Monoline; Holsteiner	Usa; 1960 Holsteiner	Jossa
Dam Valetta VI Holsteiner	Merano; 1973 Holsteiner	Merlin; 1968 Holsteiner	Marlon
Dam Valetta VI Holsteiner	Merano; 1973 Holsteiner	Merlin; 1968 Holsteiner	Rhea
Dam Valetta VI Holsteiner	Merano; 1973 Holsteiner	Berolina; 1965 Holsteiner	Fasching
Dam Valetta VI Holsteiner	Merano; 1973 Holsteiner	Berolina; 1965 Holsteiner	Ulana
Dam Valetta VI Holsteiner	Novella; 1976 Holsteiner	Farnese; 1960 Holsteiner	Faehnrich
Dam Valetta VI Holsteiner	Novella; 1976 Holsteiner	Farnese; 1960 Holsteiner	Annelies
Dam Valetta VI Holsteiner	Novella; 1976 Holsteiner	Furth; 1969 Holsteiner	Ladykiller
Dam Valetta VI Holsteiner	Novella; 1976 Holsteiner	Furth; 1969 Holsteiner	Optima
