= Der Löwe =

German Thoroughbred stallion

- Der Löwe
- Breed: Thoroughbred
- Sire: Wahnfried
- Grandsire: Flamboyant
- Dam: Lehnsherrin
- Maternal grandsire: Herold
- Sex: Stallion
- Foaled: 1944
- Died: 1973 (aged 28–29)
- Country: Germany
- Color: Dark Brown
- Breeder: P. Mühlhens, Röttgen Stud

Major wins
- Grosser Preis von Baden

Der Löwe (1944–1973) was a successful stallion who had a great impact on the breeding of Warmbloods and is thought by some to be one of the most important post-war stallions to stand at stud.

== Early life ==
Der Löwe, also spelled Der Loewe, was foaled at Röttgen Stud in 1944. He was sired by Wahnfried, and out of Lehnsherrin. He stood at 158 cm tall, and was a dark brown.

== Performance and breeding career ==
Der Löwe was used as a racehorse for the first years of his life, and was a successful stakes winner, most notably winning the Grosser Preis von Baden in 1948. He was then sent to the Hanoverian stud at Grossenworden at the age of 7, to begin his breeding career. Der Löwe stood at Grossenworden from 1951 to 1961, before standing at Luhmühlen from 1962 to 1968, Otterstedt from 1969 to 1971, Sottrum in 1972, and Bargstedt in 1973. His breeding career spanned 20 years, during which time he produced 6 state stallions, 158 registered mares, as well as 314 competition horses who earned winning of DM750,000.

In his career, Der Löwe produced many international-caliber sport horses, known for their expressive movement (although they were usually quite sensitive to sound). Show jumpers included Der Lord and Loriot, both ridden by Hartwig Steenken. In eventing, Löwenstern was very successful with Nils Haagensen. He also sired dressage horses such as Karin Schlüter's Liostro, Erika Scharzkopf's Löwenherz, Carola Lampe's Lanthan, Holger& Inge Schmezers' Lady Lou, Hans-Jürgen Armbrust's Leopardin, Marjolyn Greeve's Lucky Boy, John Winnett's and Leopardi.

Perhaps most known were Lugano I and Lugano II, full-brothers sired by Der Lowe. Lugano I sired good dressage horses, as well as superb show jumpers. Lugano II produced the stallion Lombard, making him grand-sire to Lanthan and Leubus.

Although 10 of his grandsons or great-grandsons stood at the Celle Stud in the 1980s, his influence has been slowly decreasing. He has had a more lasting impact on the breeding of Belgian jumpers, through his grandson Lugano van la Roche. Additionally, he is one of only a handful of Hanoverian stallions licensed by the Holstein Verband for breeding.

Der Löwe died at the age of 29. His skeleton is displayed at the Verden horse museum.

== Breeding ==
Der Löwe includes in his pedigree Dark Ronald, son of Bay Ronald, both of whom are well known for their profound influence on the breeding of warmbloods. Dark Ronald was successful on the track and in the breeding shed in Britain, before being shipped to the German state stud of Graditz. In Germany, Dark Ronald went on to become one of the most prolific stallions ever imported, producing sons such as Prunus, Herold, and Wallenstein.

Der Löwe's sire, Wahnfried, was the winner of the German St. Leger. Wahnfried's pedigree includes 1903 English Triple Crown winner Rock Sand, who was also grand-sire to Man o' War. Great-grandsire Tracery won the St. Leger and sired many excellent racehorses in Britain.

== Pedigree ==
Pedigree of Der Löwe
Sire Wahnfried b. 1961	Flamboyant br. 1918	Tracery br. 1909	Rock Sand
Sire Wahnfried b. 1961	Flamboyant br. 1918	Tracery br. 1909	Topiary
Sire Wahnfried b. 1961	Flamboyant br. 1918	Simonath b. 1905	St. Simon
Sire Wahnfried b. 1961	Flamboyant br. 1918	Simonath b. 1905	Philomath
Sire Wahnfried b. 1961	Winnica b. 1983	Wittelsbach ch. 1971	Wiesenbaum
Sire Wahnfried b. 1961	Winnica b. 1983	Wittelsbach ch. 1971	Elfe
Sire Wahnfried b. 1961	Winnica b. 1983	Witrud; 1975	Waidmannsdank
Sire Wahnfried b. 1961	Winnica b. 1983	Witrud; 1975	Maigold
Dam Lehnsherrin blk/br. 1931	Herold blk/br. 1917	Dark Ronald br. 1905	Bay Ronald
Dam Lehnsherrin blk/br. 1931	Herold blk/br. 1917	Dark Ronald br. 1905	Darkie
Dam Lehnsherrin blk/br. 1931	Herold blk/br. 1917	Hornisse b. 1908	Ard Patrick
Dam Lehnsherrin blk/br. 1931	Herold blk/br. 1917	Hornisse b. 1908	Hortensia
Dam Lehnsherrin blk/br. 1931	Lapis Electrix dkb/br. 1920	Fervor blk/br. 1906	Galtee More
Dam Lehnsherrin blk/br. 1931	Lapis Electrix dkb/br. 1920	Fervor blk/br. 1906	Festa
Dam Lehnsherrin blk/br. 1931	Lapis Electrix dkb/br. 1920	Leben Und Leben Lassen b. 1913	Marta Santa
Dam Lehnsherrin blk/br. 1931	Lapis Electrix dkb/br. 1920	Leben Und Leben Lassen b. 1913	Line of Life
