= Rantzau (horse) =

French-bred Thoroughbred racehorse

- Breed: Thoroughbred
- Sire: Foxlight
- Grandsire: Foxhunter
- Dam: Rancune
- Maternal grandsire: Cavaliere d'Arpino
- Sex: Stallion
- Foaled: 1946
- Country: France
- Color: Chestnut, blaze
- Breeder: Henri Tambareau

Rantzau (1946–1971) was a French-bred racehorse that went on to be an influential sire of dressage, show jumping, and eventing horses. Rantzau stood 16.1 hands (65 inches, 165 cm).

== Background and breeding ==
Henri Tambareau purchased the Thoroughbred mare, Rancune, in 1943 for use as a broodmare. She had won several times on the racetrack, and came from good lines, including that of the famous jumping sire Bay Ronald.

Rantzau's sire, Foxlight, was one of the best stallions of the French national stud Le Haras du Pin, and also had the blood of Bay Ronald in his pedigree. After a notable career at the track, Foxlight retired to stud duty where he was quite successful, producing both flat racers and steeplechasers. His racing blood included that of Foxlaw (winner of the Ascot Gold Cup and Newmarket Jockey Club Stakes) and Foxhunter (winner of the Ascot Gold Cup).

== Career on the track ==
As a three-year-old, Rantzau raced nine races between 2,000 and 3,000 meters, winning two and placing in five. He was then purchased by Marcel Boussac.

== Breeding career ==
Marcel Boussac went on to sell Rantzau to the French National Stud at Saint-Lô, and the stallion arrived at his new home in January 1951. When he first arrived, the stud inspector noted that he had: “good front extension, remarkably built through the shoulder and forearm, long haunches, this classy stallion of rare nobility also has low-placed joints and covers ground," and later said he was "high off the ground, with slightly long cannon bones and slightly straight and interiorly bony hocks; but he has a very lovely look, a good frame, good muscle tone, a well-angled shoulder and he is well muscled."

Between 1951 and 1962, Rantzau bred 40–49 mares a year, although these numbers dropped during the second half of his breeding career. However, he covered 772 mares during his 20 years at stud, averaging 38 each year.

It was during this time that he was first recognized as a producer of jumping horses. In 1958, Rantzau was ranked 17th top show jumping producer, moving up to the 11th spot in 1962, and fifth in 1963. In 1964, Rantzau was ranked second leading producer of jumpers, second only to the great Furioso.

In 1970, a new ranking for "best sires of dams" was published, in which Rantzau was ranked 3rd, behind Ibrahim and Furioso. The next year, the year of his death, he was placed first. Although Ibrahim took the number-one spot again in 1973, Rantzau held onto fourth place in 1980, and again managed to rank number one in 1981, ten years after his death.

Rantzau tended to produce sensitive, "difficult" horses, that were very athletic and generally excellent jumpers. Despite this reputation, riders of international calibre were interested in purchasing his offspring.

== Progeny ==
- Cor de la Bryere: the most famous of Rantzau's sons. One of the most influential stallions in Holsteiner breeding, sired international jumpers and dressage horses, and produced 49 approved sons.

=== Sire line tree ===
Descendants of Rantzau (click to show)
- Rantzau
  - Pacha du Bourg
  - Echo de Cavron
  - Labrador C
  - Nez de Cuit
  - Prince
  - Quelqu'Un
  - Roi du Manoir
  - Starter
  - Cor de la Bryere
    - Constant
    - Calypso I
      - Calipso
      - Chacomo
    - Calando I
      - Calandus
        - Calei Joter
    - Calypso II
      - Champ Of Class
      - Contender
        - Contango
        - Montender
        - Contendro I
      - Classiker
        - Charon
        - Claas J
        - Colani
      - Chaucer I
      - Crazy Cocktail
      - Chin Chin
      - Chaucer II
      - Carbid
      - Montemorelos la Silla
      - Compliment
      - Cardano
      - Carismo
    - Carneval
    - Contact
    - Calando II
    - Caletto I
      - Cartusch
      - Cantus
        - Come On
        - Calvaro V
        - Calido I
        - Caesar van de Helle
        - Canturo
      - Calvaro Z
        - Snaike de Blondel
      - Cambridge
        - Chambertin
      - Cabrol Amicor
    - Calando III
    - Corlandus
    - Calypso III
    - Caletto II
      - Caretino
        - Concord
        - Cartello B
        - Cheenook
        - Crocadile Dandy
        - Caridor Z
        - Carpaccio
        - Cockney
        - Caretano Z
        - Celesino
        - Connally
        - Chup Chup
        - Cristallo
        - Casall
        - Caldoto
        - Caresino
        - Carlo Cassini
      - Cascadeur
      - Casino
      - Cento
      - Caridor Z
      - Carpaccio
        - Chico's Boy
      - Clintino
      - Cristallo
    - Cinzano
    - Calypso IV
    - Cavalier Royale
      - Call Again Cavalier
      - Chippison
      - Ben Along Time
      - McGuiness
    - Calypso V
    - Caberet
    - Cicero
    - Cor de Brilliant
    - Calando IV
    - Caletto III
    - Chairman
    - Corrado I
      - Indorado
      - Clinton
        - Cornet Obolensky
        - El Dorado van de Zeshoek
        - Zacharov
    - Cortez 679
    - Cordalme Z
      - Careful 23
      - Calwaro
      - Couleur Rubin
      - Couleur Rouge
    - Carte d'Or
    - Cor Noir
    - Calando V
    - Calando VI
    - Chaka Khan
    - Corland
      - Rocland
    - Come Back I
    - Come Back II
    - Corrado II
    - Corde Star

== See also ==
- Coulisa
