= 1948 Melbourne Cup =

Edition of the Melbourne Cup

- Melbourne Cup
- Location: Flemington Racecourse
- Date: 2 Nov 1948
- Distance: 2 miles
- Winning horse: Rimfire
- Winning time: 3:21.00
- Final odds: 80/1
- Jockey: Ray Neville
- Trainer: Sam Boyden
- Surface: Turf

The 1948 Melbourne Cup was a two-mile handicap horse race which took place on Tuesday, 2 November 1948. It was the 83rd running of the Melbourne Cup.

== Details ==
The 1948 Melbourne Cup was a controversial edition. After a tense battle down the Flemington straight Rimfire had won defeating the well-performed Dark Marne by half a head. Rimfire was trained by Sam Boyden and ridden by Ray Neville at the age of 16, who was chosen because he could make the horse's weight of 7st 2lb (45.4 kilograms). Boyden did not inform Neville about his Melbourne Cup ride until the morning of the race, to ensure Neville would not lose any sleep. The controversy surrounded the fact that this was the first Melbourne Cup to make use of the photo finish after a camera had recently been installed at Flemington. When Rimfire's number was semaphored many on course believed that the photo must have been wrong. There has been a lot of conjecture about if the camera was aligned correctly, but the truth is Rimfire was the winner. Neville had outrode premier Sydney jockey Jack Thompson, who was aboard Dark Marne and who would never ride a Melbourne Cup winner. Neville was only making his ninth ever ride in a race and he never rode another winner.

This is the list of placegetters for the 1948 Melbourne Cup.

Place	Name	Jockey	Trainer
1	Rimfire	R. Neville	S. Boyden
2	Dark Marne	J. Thompson	D. L. Burke
3	Saxony	J. Gilmore	J. L. Meagher

== See also ==
- Melbourne Cup
- List of Melbourne Cup winners
- Victoria Racing Club
