= Coulisa =

German show jumping mare

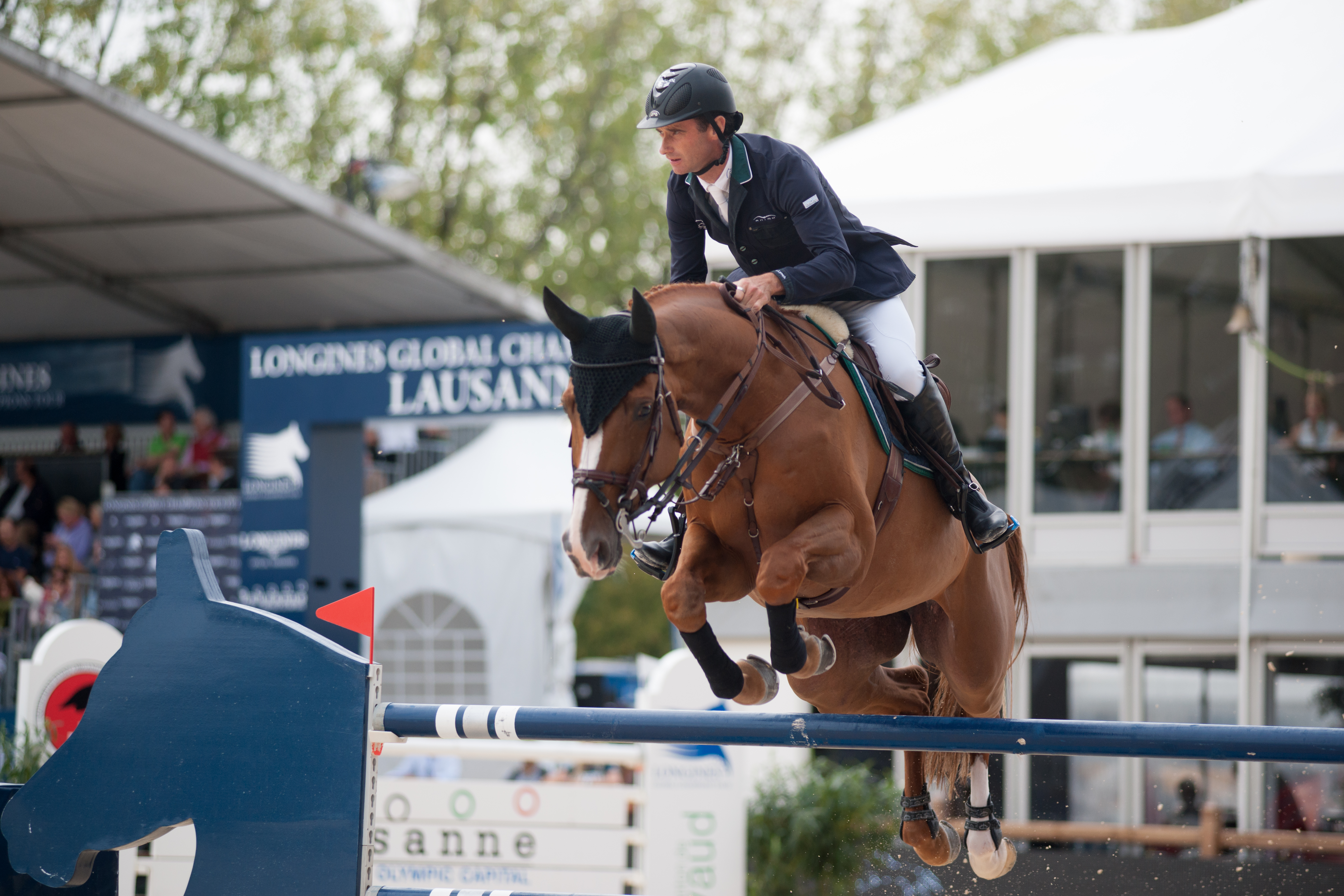
- Coulisa ridden by Denis Lynch at the Global Champions Tour stage in Lausanne in 2013
- Breed: Oldenburger
- Sire: Couleur Rubin
- Dam: Sanisa
- Sex: Female
- Foaled: Chacclina; Neustadt-Glewe
- Died: 11 October 2014
- Owner: Thomas Straumann

Coulisa (born February 8, 2004, died October 11, 2014) was a chestnut mare registered in the Oldenburg studbook, a daughter of Couleur Rubin. Inseminated at 3 by the stallion Chacco-Blue, she gave birth in 2008 to the filly Chacclina at her home stud, Gestüt Lewitz, in Germany. She was then acquired by Swiss entrepreneur Thomas Straumann, who entrusted her to Irish rider Denis Lynch for show jumping competitions from 2012.

Heavily whipped during the Grand Prix of the official 5-star International Show Jumping Competition (CSIO5*) in Rotterdam in June 2014, she fell into Spa bars and fractured her hip. The fall, broadcast live on Dutch television, leads to controversy due to the lack of punishment for the rider. Coulisa was euthanized three months later.

== History ==
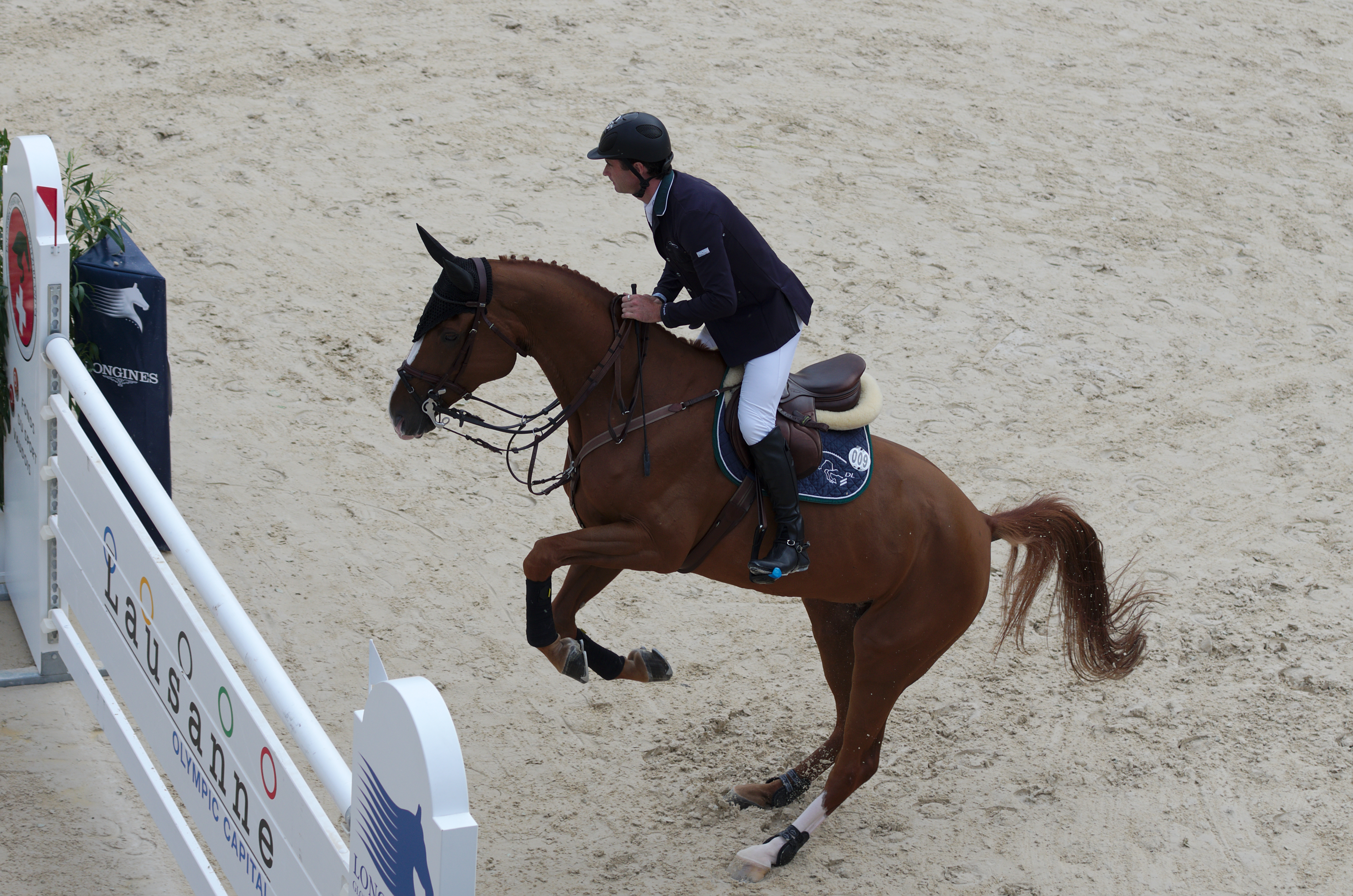
Coulisa ridden by Denys Lynch on the Global Champions Tour stage in Lausanne in 2013, during a rising phase over jumps.

Coulisa was born on February 8, 2004 at the Gestüt Lewitz (Lewitz stud farm) in Neustadt-Glewe, Germany.

=== Debut at top level ===
Owned by Basel entrepreneur and patron Thomas Straumann, she was entrusted to Denis Lynch, an Irish rider supported by Straumann. In 2012, the pair placed 16th in the Münster International Young Show Jumping competition, then finished eighth in the final of the Edsor Youngster Cup. They also took part in their first CSI5* (5-star international jumping competition) on the Global Champions Tour stage in Oliva in May 2012, over 1.45 m obstacles.

At the end of April 2014, Lynch and Coulisa placed 10th in a round counting towards the Global Champions Tour. In May 2014, they won the Grand Prix at the San Giovanni 3-star International Show Jumping Competition (CSI3*) in Marignano. Two weeks later, they took the Grand Prix at the CSI3* in Nörten-Hardenberg, Germany, with a clear round in 40.38 seconds, ahead of Brazil's Marlon Modolo Zanotelli on Extra van Essene. Denis Lynch won €12,500.

=== Accident in Rotterdam and death ===
Coulisa took part in the Rotterdam CSIO5* in June 2014, struggling to complete the second round of the Nations Cup on June 20 with 16 faults. Denis Lynch nevertheless entered her in the Rotterdam Port Grand Prix on Sunday June 22, 2014. The pair commit a big fault on the river, which Coulisa barely manages to cross under the severe blows of her rider's whip and spurs, after nearly stumbling. Frightened by the blows, she missed a stride on the penultimate obstacle (no. 11), three Spa bars, and fell heavily. The fall, broadcast live on Dutch television, provoked a widespread "reaction of horror", including among the riders, journalists and judges. Lynch escaped unhurt.

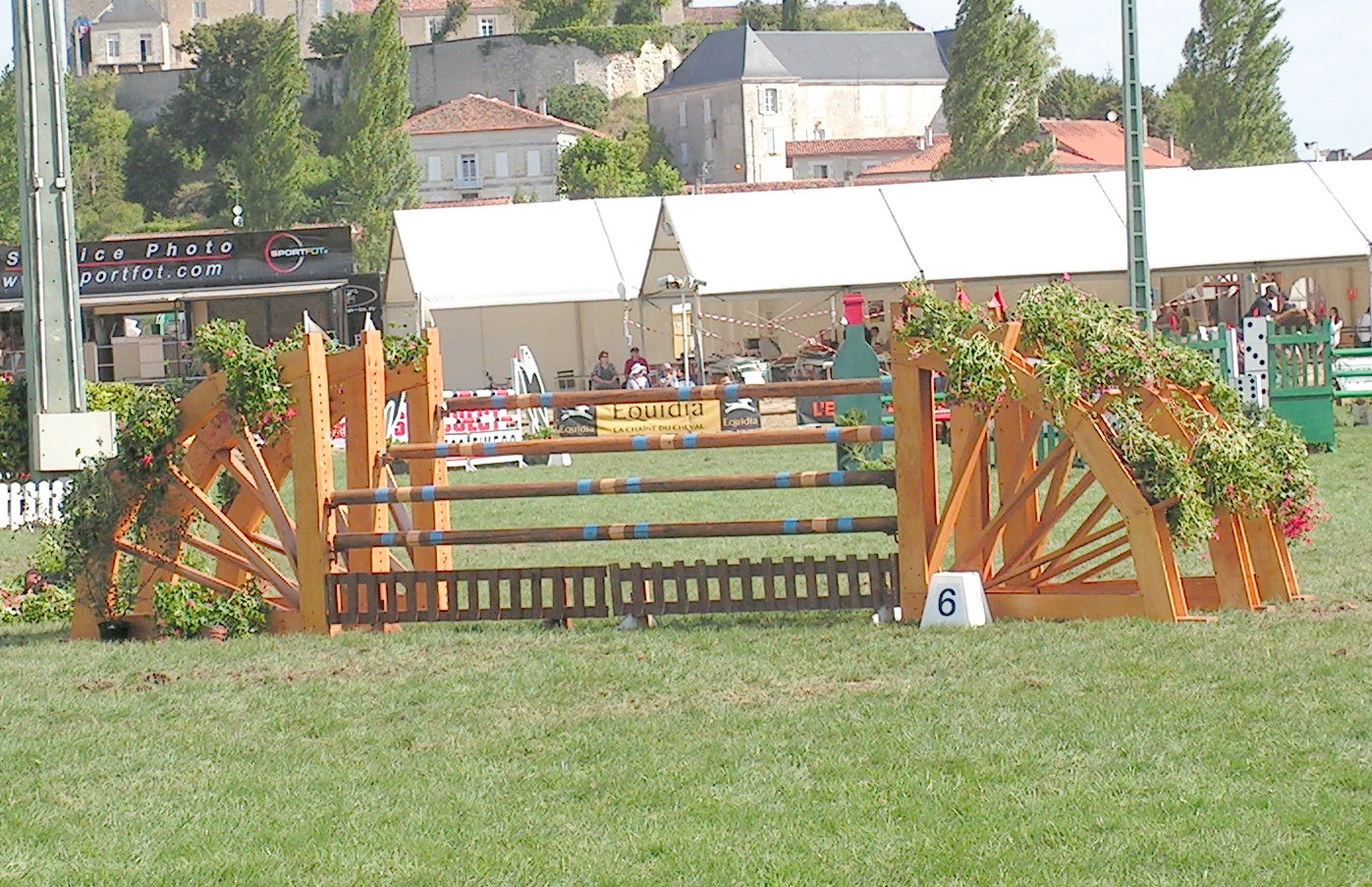
Spa bars, the type of obstacle in which Coulisa fell.

Transported to a local veterinary clinic, Coulisa presented a visible wound to a hind limb. The following day, June 23, veterinary examination revealed a hip fracture. According to the Swiss media outlet Le Cavalier romand, the case caused quite a stir. With the ensuing surgery announced as successful in early July 2014, a recovery period lasting between four and eight months is announced for Coulisa, before her potential return to competition.

After three months of attempted care, Coulisa is euthanized on October 11, 2014, at the age of 10.

Dirk Willem Rosie, editor-in-chief of the Dutch magazine Paardenkrant, as well as French journalist Sébastien Roullier (Grand Prix magazine) and Dutch journalist René Banierink (BN DeStem) were astonished that Lynch, known for past doping on his horses, had not been punished for his dangerous attitude towards his mare. Despite a request for intervention from the president of the Geesteren CSI jury, Joop van Dijk de Wierden, Lynch received no sanction.

== Description ==
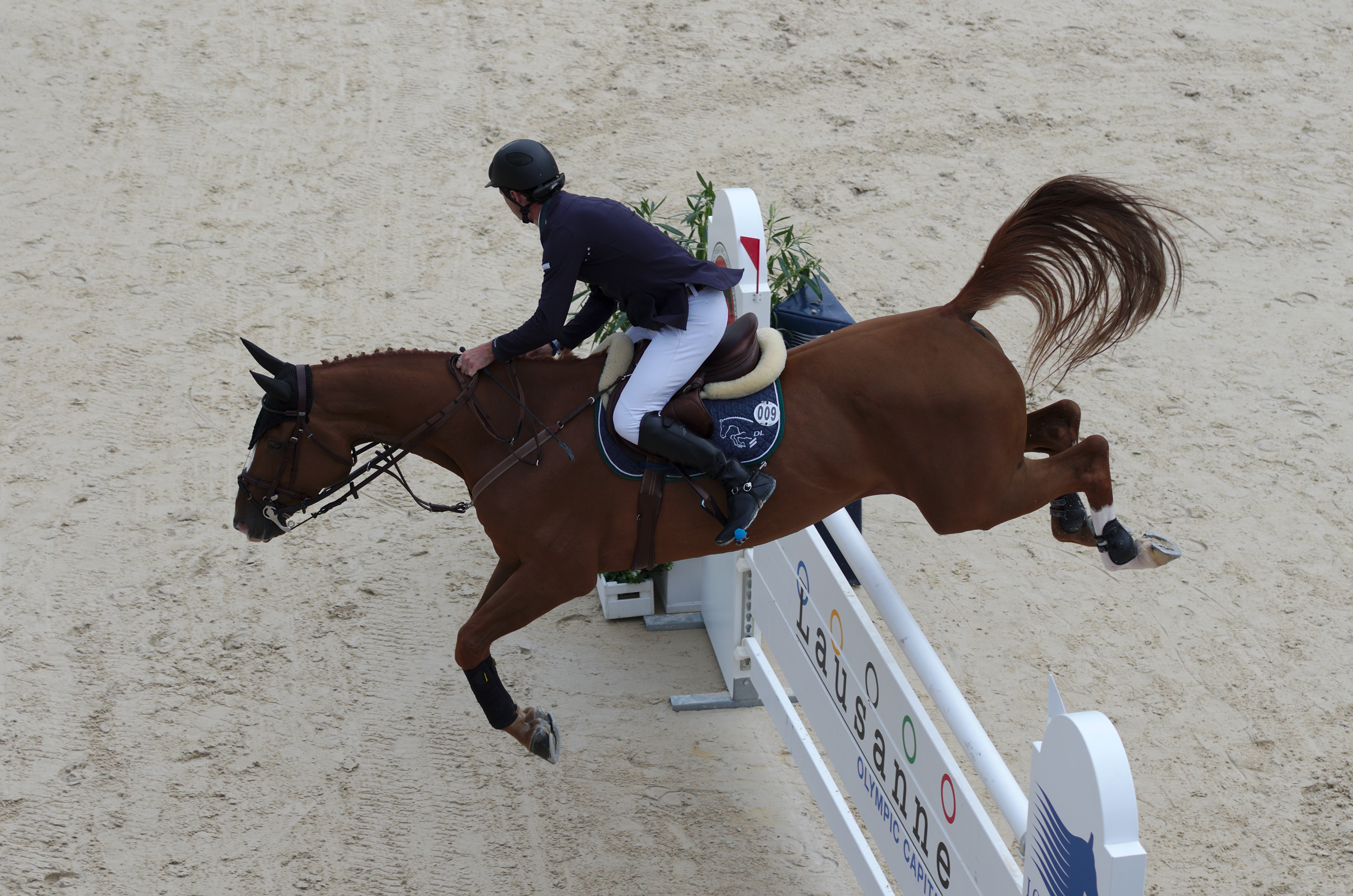
Coulisa during the gliding phase over an obstacle, at the Global Champions Tour stage in Lausanne in 2013.

Coulisa is a chestnut mare registered in the Oldenburg studbook. She is described as a "powerful" show jumping mare.

== Results ==
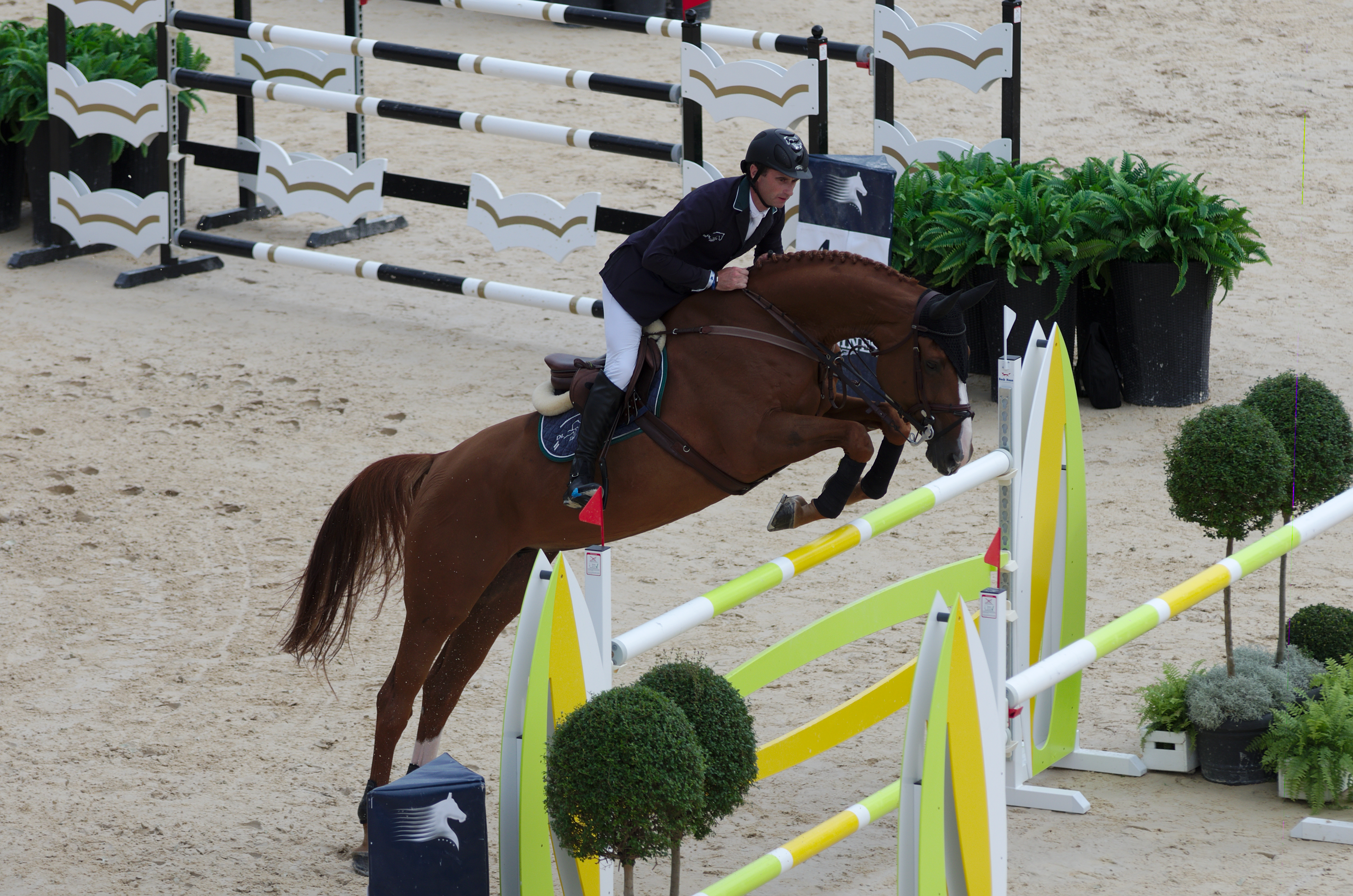
Coulisa during the rising phase at the jump, at the Global Champions Tour stage in Lausanne in 2013.

According to data from the International Federation for Equestrian Sports, Coulisa was ridden at international competition level between 2012 and 2014, taking 4 starts at show jumping competitions with a maximum height of 1.60 m, including Rotterdam.

- April 24, 2014: 10th in the Global Champions Tour stage in Antwerp, at 1.50 m-1.55 m.
- May 11, 2014: winner of the Grand Prix at the CSI3* San Giovanni in Marignano, at 1.50 m-1.60 m.
- May 25, 2014: winner of the Grand Prix of the CSI3* at Nörten-Hardenberg, at 1.55 m.

== Origins ==
Coulisa is a daughter of the Oldenburg stallion Couleur Rubin and the mare Sanisa, by the Holsteiner Sandro. Couleur Rubin's breeder, Harli Seifert, describes the Grannuschka mare as "magnificently tall for a Grannus daughter, confident in her character and sensitive, but not fussy".

Pedigree of Coulisa (2004-2014)
Sire Couleur Rubin (1996)	Cor d'Alme Z (1986)	Cor de la Bryère (1968-2000)	Rantzau (1946-1971)
Sire Couleur Rubin (1996)	Cor d'Alme Z (1986)	Cor de la Bryère (1968-2000)	Quenotte (1960)
Sire Couleur Rubin (1996)	Cor d'Alme Z (1986)	Aleska Z (1980)	Almé (1966-1991)
Sire Couleur Rubin (1996)	Cor d'Alme Z (1986)	Aleska Z (1980)	Landdorne Z (1967)
Sire Couleur Rubin (1996)	Grannuschka (1991)	Grannus (1972-1993)	Graphit (1964)
Sire Couleur Rubin (1996)	Grannuschka (1991)	Grannus (1972-1993)	Odessa (1967)
Sire Couleur Rubin (1996)	Grannuschka (1991)	Rumina (1985)	Ramino (1980)
Sire Couleur Rubin (1996)	Grannuschka (1991)	Rumina (1985)	Voila (1979)
Dam Sanisa (1992)	Sandro (1974-2005)	Sacramento Song (1967)	Sicambre (1948)
Dam Sanisa (1992)	Sandro (1974-2005)	Sacramento Song (1967)	Easter Gala (1956)
Dam Sanisa (1992)	Sandro (1974-2005)	Duerte (1967)	Wahnfried (1962)
Dam Sanisa (1992)	Sandro (1974-2005)	Duerte (1967)	Velour (1961)
Dam Sanisa (1992)	Lisa (1977)	Lindberg (1971)	Der Loewe (1944)
Dam Sanisa (1992)	Lisa (1977)	Lindberg (1971)	Feder (1958)
Dam Sanisa (1992)	Lisa (1977)	Drina (1970)	Domspatz (1952)
Dam Sanisa (1992)	Lisa (1977)	Drina (1970)	Alsterpalme (1961)

== Descent ==
Coulisa is the dam of a sport mare by Chacco-Blue, Chacclina, also born at Gestüt Lewitz (Lewitz stud) in 2008. In 2021, Chacclina will be ridden in show jumping at 1.35 m level by American riders Raymond Texel and Laura Brady.
