= Pik As =

Sport horse

- Breed: Thoroughbred
- Sire: Abendfrieden
- Grandsire: Ferro
- Dam: Pechfackel
- Maternal grandsire: Mirza II
- Sex: Stallion
- Foaled: 1949
- Colour: Bay and star

Pik As (Ace of Spades) was a Thoroughbred stallion who was a very influential sport horse sire, especially in show jumping.

Pik As was most known for his ability as a sire, passing on his beautiful movement and a great jumping ability.

Pik As stood at stud from 1952-1969. He produced great jumping horses, and was influential in the breeding of warmbloods in Germany during his lifetime. His damline contained Postenkette, dam of Pindar xx (private Trakehner stallion), Parenzo xx (Warendorf state stallion), Pernod xx (Westphalia private stallion), Playmate (Warendorf state stallion) and Perser (Celle State Stud), a full brother to Pik As. All these stallions became very influential in their areas.

Descendants:

- Mr. T: 1986 World Champion jumper
- Aramis: 1984 World Cup winner
- Pik König: producer of show jumpers and dressage horses
- Pik Bube: with Herbert Rehbein, won 11 out of 12 competitions in his first season alone
- Pik Bube II

However, the stallion's influence has diminished in recent years.
