= Cor de la Bryere =

German horse

- Breed: Selle Français
- Sire: Rantzau (Thoroughbred)
- Grandsire: Foxlight (Thoroughbred)
- Dam: Quenotte B (Selle Français)
- Maternal grandsire: Lurioso (Selle Français)
- Sex: Stallion
- Foaled: 23 April 1968; Yvré-le-Pôlin, France
- Died: April 27, 2000 (aged 32); Sollwitt, Germany
- Country: Germany
- Colour: Dark bay, star, half-cannon left hind

Cor de la Bryère (23 April 1968 – 27 April 2000), nicknamed "Corde", is one of the most influential sires in modern warmblood breeding. He is known as the "Reserve Stallion of the Century", second only to Landgraf I. He stood 16.2 hands (66 inches, 168 cm).

== Breeding career ==
The Holsteiner Verband had noticed the success that French blood had in the Oldenburg breed, which had used the stallions Furioso II and Futuro (both by Furioso) to upgrade their stock, and wished to introduce it into their own horses. The Oldenburg breeder Alwin Schockemöhle offered to part-lease the stallion Urioso (by Furioso). An inspection committee travelled to France to evaluate the horse, and happened to find Cor de la Bryère while they were there. The Verband purchased and imported the three-year-old to Schleswig-Holstein, Germany, in 1971. The same year, he was the champion of his 100-day Test.

On April 27, 2000, at the age of 32, Cor de la Bryère was put down due to acute heart disease.

To see an online video of Cor de la Bryère:

=== Offspring ===
- Approved sons: 85 (as of 2000)
- States premium mares: 86 (as of 2000)
- Progeny winnings to 1993: 2,000,000+ DM
- Progeny winnings to 1996: 5,581,229 DM

Described by breeders as a 'gift from heaven', Cor de la Bryère has been especially successful producing jumping horses, as he passes on his incredible bascule (see here ), scope, and jumping technique. Cor de la Bryere also passed on his willingness and trainability. Romedio Graf von Thun-Hohenstein described the stallion: 'The arching back, like a taut band of steel combined with the super elastic end gives limitless, but always expedient, springing capability to the natural dynamics of each effort. Add to that ease of riding, marvelous disposition, and a floating, highly balanced canter. These qualities are absolutely to the benefit of young horses, who will no longer have to pay with premature breakdowns caused by jumping and showing solely with a raw, crude jumping talent.'

Cor de la Bryère has had an incredible impact on the Holsteiner breed, occurring in more than 70% of Holsteiner pedigrees, and is credited for improving the breed's jumping technique. He also had a huge impact on the Oldenburg breed.

His influence in France was limited, mainly due to his jumping. Although he was quick to fold his front legs, he did not have great power. When crossed with Holsteiner mares, which provided this power, his offspring were very successful in the show ring. However, the French mares did not have this power, so they were usually a poor cross to Cor de la Bryere.

Cor de la Bryère was especially successful in breeding with certain mares. Tabelle (by Heisporn) produced five approved sons, including Calypso I and Calypso II. Furgund (by Colombo) bred with him 18 times, producing six approved sons (Calando I - VI). Deka produced Caletto I, II and III, all by the stallion.

Cor de la Bryère stood at Siethwende from 1971 to 1984, Zangersheide 1985, Elmshorn 1986 to 1988, and Sollwittfeld from 1989 until his death in 2000. In his first season, he covered 70 mares, and four colts from his first crop were licensed.

== Sire line tree ==
Descendants of Cor de la Bryere (click to show)
- Cor de la Bryere
  - Constant
  - Calypso I
    - Calipso
    - Chacomo
  - Calando I
    - Calandus
      - Calei Joter
  - Calypso II
    - Champ Of Class
    - Contender
      - Contango
        - Maestro
        - New Tango
        - Ravel
        - Citango
        - Walando
        - Alcazar
        - Don Tango
        - Feel Good
      - Montender
      - Contendro I
        - Codex One
        - Contendros Bube
        - Chagell
        - Chopin III
        - Contendros
        - Fischerchipmunk
        - Kontestro
    - Classiker
      - Charon
      - Claas J
      - Colani
    - Chaucer I
    - Crazy Cocktail
    - Chin Chin
    - Chaucer II
    - Carbid
    - Montemorelos la Silla
    - Compliment
    - Cardano
    - Carismo
  - Carneval
  - Contact
  - Calando II
  - Caletto I
    - Cartusch
    - Cantus
      - Come On
      - Calvaro V
      - Calido I
        - Coupe de Coeur
        - Coster
        - Cashmoaker
      - Caesar van de Helle
      - Canturo
        - Canturado
        - Gomez de Wiqui
        - Good Luck
        - Granturo
    - Calvaro Z
      - Snaike de Blondel
    - Cambridge
      - Chambertin
        - Calimero
        - Cedric
        - Chacco-Blue
        - Chalan
        - Can Do
        - Cazaro
        - Chamiro
        - Chamby
    - Cabrol Amicor
  - Calando III
  - Corlandus
  - Calypso III
  - Caletto II
    - Caretino
      - Concord
      - Cartello B
      - Cheenook
      - Crocadile Dandy
      - Caridor Z
      - Carpaccio
      - Cockney
      - Caretano Z
        - Cayetano Z
      - Celesino
      - Connally
      - Chup Chup
      - Cristallo
      - Casall
        - Istanbull V.H Ooievaarshof
      - Caldoto
      - Caresino
      - Carlo Cassini
    - Cascadeur
    - Casino
    - Cento
    - Caridor Z
    - Carpaccio
      - Chico's Boy
    - Clintino
  - Cinzano
  - Calypso IV
  - Cavalier Royale
    - Call Again Cavalier
    - Chippison
    - Ben Along Time
    - McGuiness
  - Calypso V
  - Caberet
  - Cicero
  - Cor de Brilliant
  - Calando IV
  - Caletto III
  - Chairman
  - Corrado I
    - Indorado
    - Clinton
      - Cornet Obolensky
        - Cornet d'Amour
        - Cristallo
        - Cornet du Lys
        - Comme il Faut
        - Cornado
        - Balou du Reventon
        - Clooney 51
        - Colestus
        - Cornet 36
        - Cornetto K
        - Corbinian
      - El Dorado van de Zeshoek
        - Elektric Blue P
        - Grandorado TN
        - Highway TN
      - Zacharov
  - Cortez 679
  - Cordalme Z
    - Careful 23
    - Calwaro
    - Couleur Rubin
    - Couleur Rouge
  - Carte d'Or
  - Cor Noir
  - Calando V
  - Calando VI
  - Chaka Khan
  - Corland
    - Rocland
  - Come Back I
  - Come Back II
  - Corrado II
  - Corde Star

== Pedigree ==
Cor de la Bryère was foaled in France, and was by the Thoroughbred Rantzau, a racehorse and a producer of fantastic jumping horses. His dam, Quenotte B, also had a jumping pedigree, as she was sired by Lurioso, that was sired by the great Furioso. Despite his fantastic pedigree, the French selection committee suggested he be gelded. His owner, Xavier Ribard, decided to sell him.

Pedigree for Cor de la Bryere
1968 Dark bay

Pedigree of Cor de la Bryere
Sire Rantzau ch. 1946 Thoroughbred	Foxlight ch. 1935; Thoroughbred	Foxhunter ch. 1929; Thoroughbred	Foxlaw
Sire Rantzau ch. 1946 Thoroughbred	Foxlight ch. 1935; Thoroughbred	Foxhunter ch. 1929; Thoroughbred	Trimestral
Sire Rantzau ch. 1946 Thoroughbred	Foxlight ch. 1935; Thoroughbred	Chauia ch. 1925; Thoroughbred	St. Just
Sire Rantzau ch. 1946 Thoroughbred	Foxlight ch. 1935; Thoroughbred	Chauia ch. 1925; Thoroughbred	Barka
Sire Rantzau ch. 1946 Thoroughbred	Rancune b. 1940; Thoroughbred	Cavaliere Darpino b. 1926; Thoroughbred	Havresac
Sire Rantzau ch. 1946 Thoroughbred	Rancune b. 1940; Thoroughbred	Cavaliere Darpino b. 1926; Thoroughbred	Chuette
Sire Rantzau ch. 1946 Thoroughbred	Rancune b. 1940; Thoroughbred	Rockella ch. 1936; Thoroughbred	Bishop's Rock
Sire Rantzau ch. 1946 Thoroughbred	Rancune b. 1940; Thoroughbred	Rockella ch. 1936; Thoroughbred	Coquerelle
Dam Quenotte B br. 1960 Selle Français	Lurioso b. 1944; Selle Français	Furioso br. 1939; Thoroughbred	Precipitation
Dam Quenotte B br. 1960 Selle Français	Lurioso b. 1944; Selle Français	Furioso br. 1939; Thoroughbred	Maureen
Dam Quenotte B br. 1960 Selle Français	Lurioso b. 1944; Selle Français	Riquette; 1939; Selle Français	Italien
Dam Quenotte B br. 1960 Selle Français	Lurioso b. 1944; Selle Français	Riquette; 1939; Selle Français	Mignonne
Dam Quenotte B br. 1960 Selle Français	Vestale du Bois Margot ch. 1942; Selle Français	Landau ch. 1933; Selle Français	Extravagant
Dam Quenotte B br. 1960 Selle Français	Vestale du Bois Margot ch. 1942; Selle Français	Landau ch. 1933; Selle Français	Victoire
Dam Quenotte B br. 1960 Selle Français	Vestale du Bois Margot ch. 1942; Selle Français	Kristine du Bois Margot ch. 1932; Selle Français	Clovis
Dam Quenotte B br. 1960 Selle Français	Vestale du Bois Margot ch. 1942; Selle Français	Kristine du Bois Margot ch. 1932; Selle Français	Concurrente du Bois Margot

== See also ==
- Coulisa
- Pégase du Mûrier
