= Wotan (horse) =

Australian Thoroughbred racehorse

Wotan (Siegfried-Left by Martian; foaled 1932) was a racehorse that won the 1936 Melbourne Cup. He is notable for winning the Cup despite being at odds of over 100 to 1, a feat also achieved by The Pearl (1871), Old Rowley (1940), and Prince of Penzance (2015).

Wotan was owned by the Smith brothers of Mangaweka and ridden by Australian jockey Ossie Phillips. Silver Standard was second and Balkan Prince third. The winning stake was £7200, however it was estimated by the Melbourne media that the Smith brothers gained £30,000 from bets.

He started racing in New Zealand at two years old and did not have a good race record, he only won once as a young horse and again as a four year old in a hack race. The Smith brothers sent him to Australia in 1935. He was unplaced in a race, the Clibborn Stakes at Randwick in October and then returned to Wanganui for a break. Upon returning to Australia to join trainer, Jack Fryer, he was second last in the 1936 Cox Plate. The Melbourne cup was his next Australian start and he won in a then Australian record time of 3:21.25. Upon returning to New Zealand, he did manage a win in the Feilding Cup.

Wotan’s jockey adopted a similar tactic to that employed by Jimmy Cassidy with Kiwi nearly 50 years later in his Melbourne Cup victory and sat last for much of the race.

Wotan’s mother, Left, was also the dam of well performed horses Gaine Carrington, winner of the 1933 Caulfield Cup, and Peter Jackson, winner of the 1933 Moonee Valley Gold Cup.

== See also ==
- Thoroughbred racing in New Zealand
