= Holsteiner =

Breed of horse

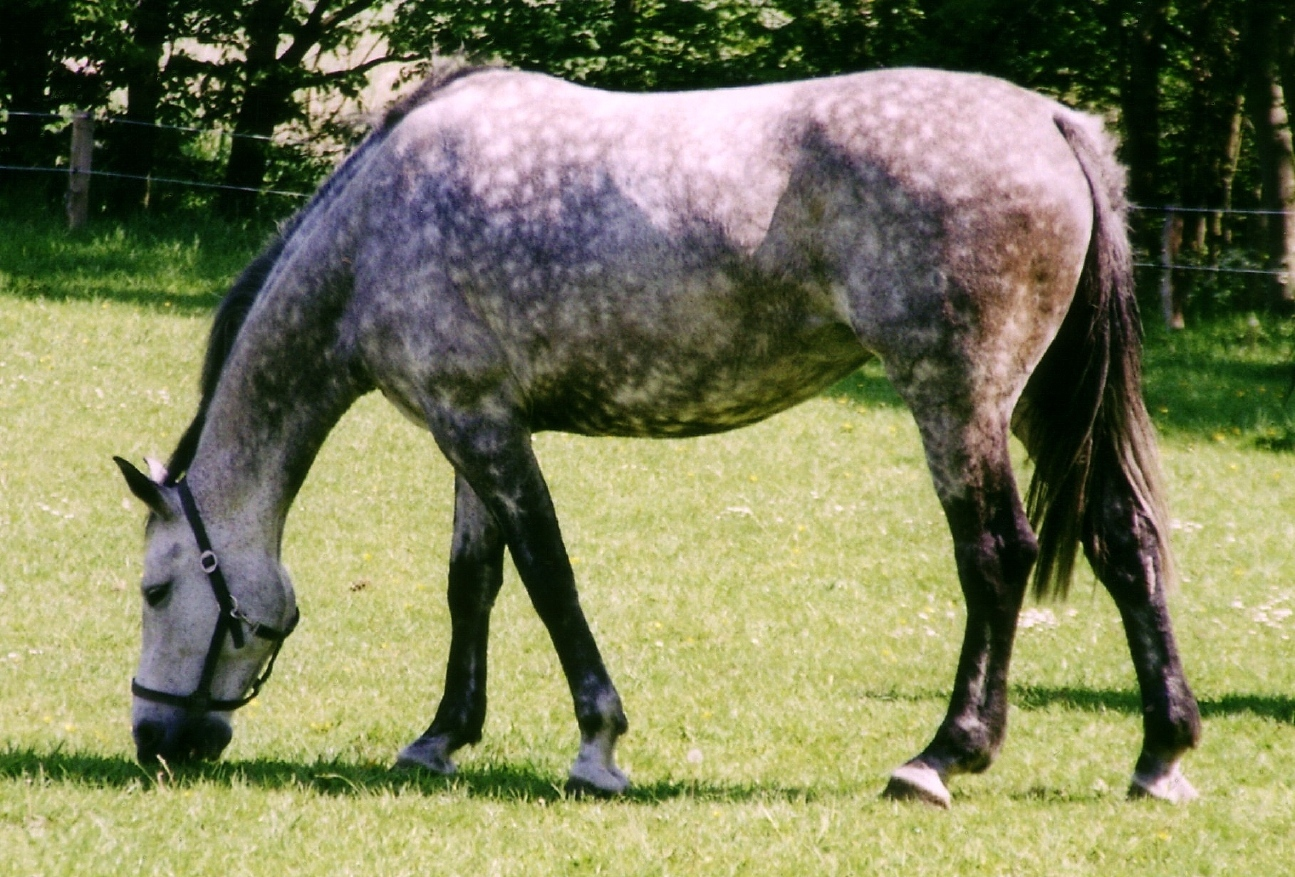

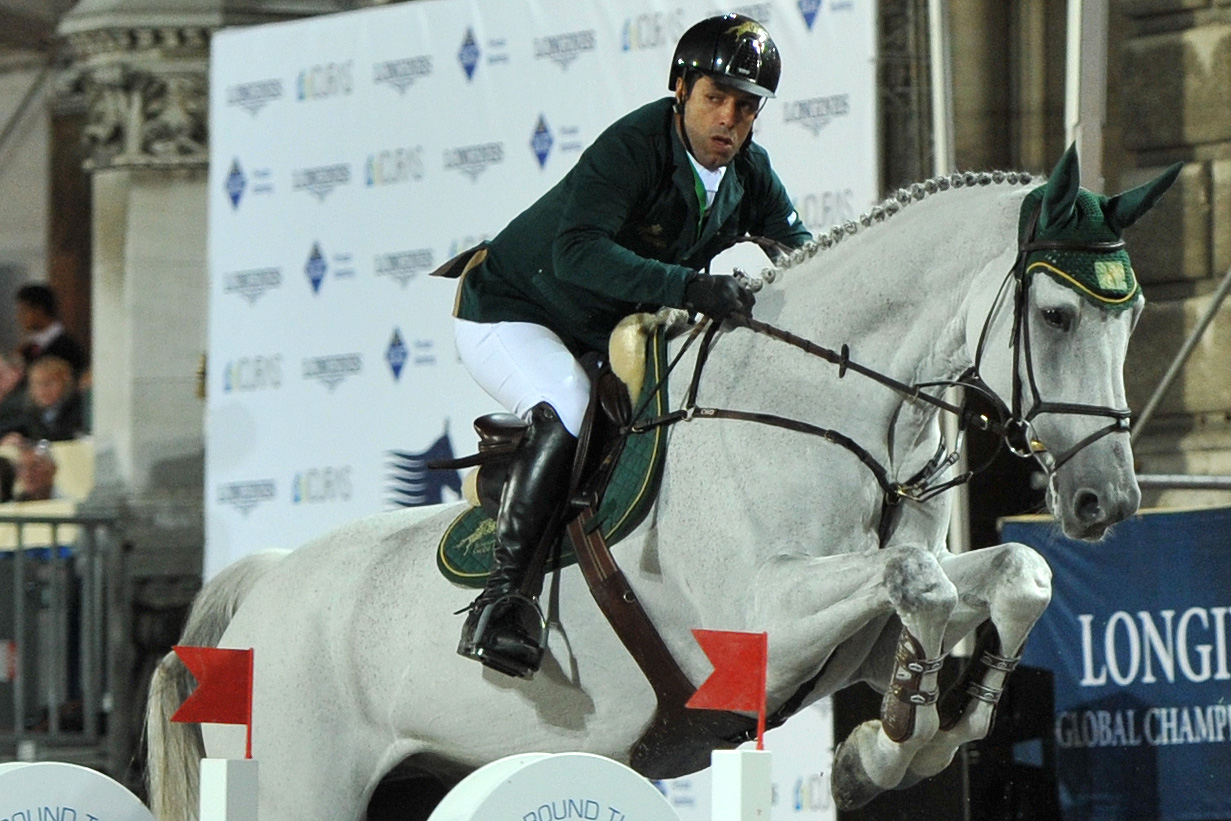
- Other names: Holstein
- Country of origin: Schleswig-Holstein, Germany

Traits
- Distinguishing features: German sport horse bred for show jumping, primarily grey and bay in color.

Breed standards
- Holsteiner Verband; North American Breeding District of the Holsteiner Verband

Notes
- Brand on left hind leg features the letter "H" within a crowned shield.

The Holsteiner is a horse breed originating in the Schleswig-Holstein region of northern Germany. It is thought to be the oldest of warmblood breeds, tracing back to the 13th century. Though the population is not large, Holsteiners are a dominant force of international show jumping, and are found at the top levels of dressage, combined driving, show hunters, and eventing.

== Breed characteristics ==
Holsteiners are medium-framed horses averaging between 16 and 17 hands (64 and 68 inches, 163 and 173 cm) at the withers. Approved stallions must be a minimum of 16 hands and mares a minimum of 15.2 hands (62 inches, 157 cm). The type, or general appearance, exhibited by Holsteiners should be that of an athletic riding horse. As a breed, Holsteiners are known for their arched, rather high-set necks and powerful hindquarters. The heavy neck was perpetuated even in modern Holsteiners with the help of Ladykiller xx and his son, Landgraf. In centuries past, Holsteiners retained a hallmark Roman nose, but today it has been replaced by a smaller head with large, intelligent eyes. These conformational characteristics give most Holsteiners good balance and elegant movement.

Before the onset of mechanization, these horses were used in agriculture, as coach horses, and occasionally for riding. The closed stud book and careful preservation of female family lines has ensured, in an era of globalization, the horses of Holstein have a unique character. While the active gaits, arched neck, and attractive manner in harness of the early foundation bloodstock have been retained, the breed survived because of the willingness of its breeders to conform to changing market demands. The high-headed jump and leg faults were corrected with supple, basculing jumping technique and structurally correct improvement sires. In the past 15 or 20 years, even more pronounced refinement and aesthetic appeal have occurred.

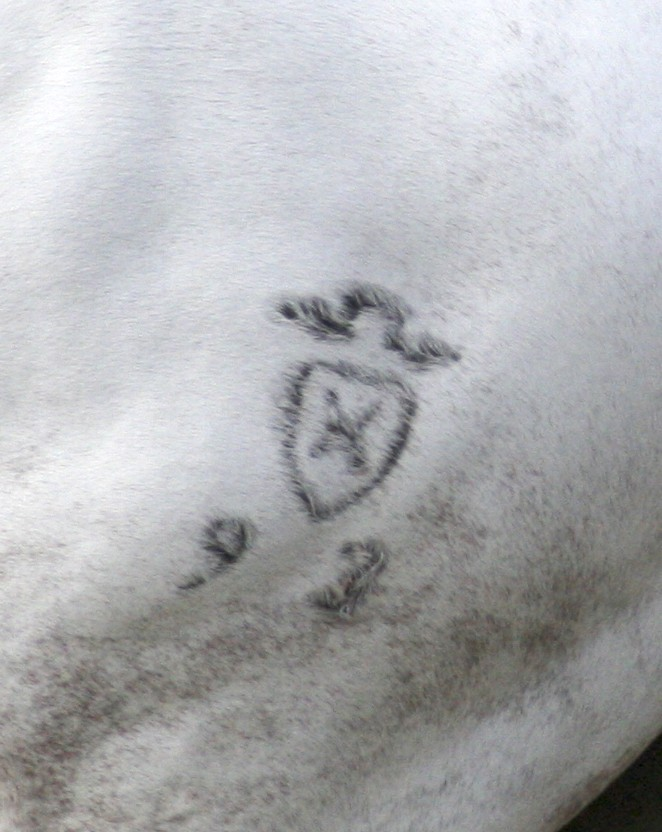
The crowned Holsteiner shield brand

The easiest way to identify a Holsteiner is by the hot brand on the left hip, which is given to foals when they are inspected for their papers and passport. Foals outside of the main registry can receive an alternate brand. In most cases, the last two digits of the life number are part of the brand. Many male Holsteiners have names beginning in the letters "C" or "L" due to the dominance of male lines perpetuated by Cor de la Bryére, Cottage Son xx, Clarimos and Ladykiller xx. However, since Holsteiners from those families are used to add jumping ability to other warmblood breeding programs, non-Holstein warmbloods also often have those initials. Fillies, though, are named by year with I and J being the same year and Q and X not being used. For example, fillies born in 1986 and 2008 had names beginning in the letter "A". The use of the sire's name as part of the name of his offspring is discouraged.

=== Gaits ===
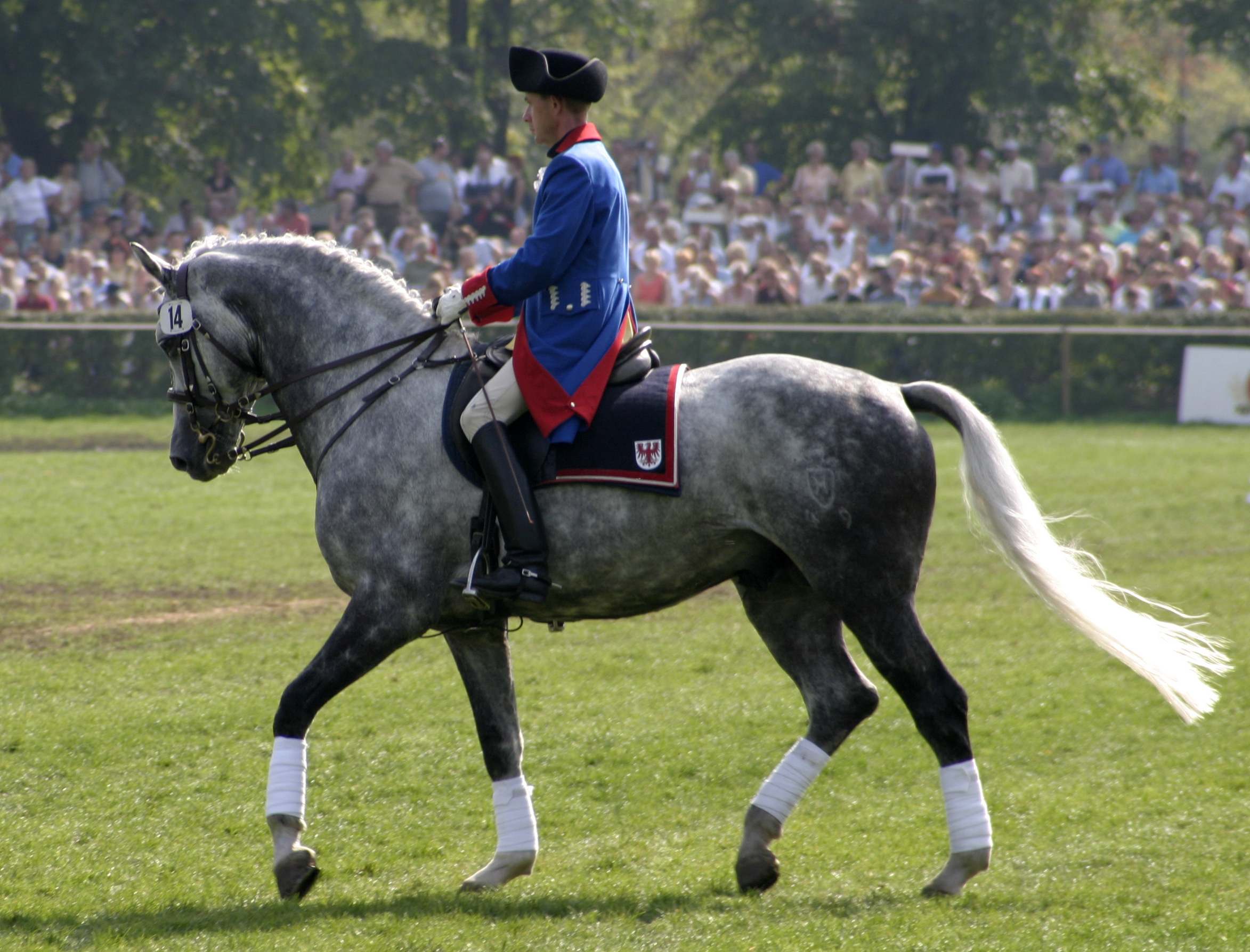
A modern Holsteiner horse

Holsteiners in general have round, generous, elastic strides with impulsion from the haunches and natural balance. In motion, Holsteiners retain the character of their coach driving forebears, often exhibiting more articulation of the joints than is common among other warmbloods. The acknowledged specialization for jumping capacity in the breed sometimes means the quality of the walk and trot suffer, though this is not the rule. The canter, which is typically light, soft, balanced, and dynamic, is the best gait of the Holsteiner.

=== Jumping ===
The strongest asset of the Holsteiner breed is their jumping ability. Even the average Holsteiner usually exhibits great power and scope, and correct technique. The scope and power were inherited from the heavier old Holsteiners, but they lacked carefulness, speed, adjustability, bascule, and technique. Improvement sires like Cor de la Bryére successively eliminated these flaws, making the Holsteiner breed internationally known for Olympic-caliber jumping. Werner Schockemöhle, a leading breeder of warmblood sport horses in neighboring Oldenburg said no breeding community in the world has a better knowledge of the show-jumping horse than the breeders of Holstein.

=== Coat colors ===
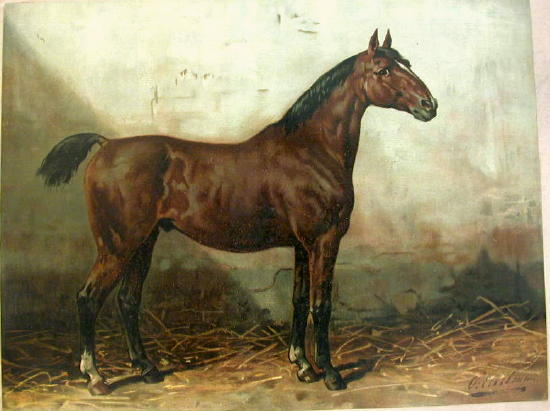
An 1898 lithograph of a Holsteiner horse shows the bay coat and coach horse qualities, including a docked tail.

Similar to horse breeds in the nearby areas of Oldenburg, Groningen, and Friesland, traditional Holsteiners were dark-colored and minimally marked. This tendency has evolved into a preference for black, dark bay, and brown, though lighter shades such as chestnuts and grays are also permitted. Horses with large white spots suggestive of pinto patterning or any of the traits associated with leopard-spotting are excluded from the registry. Palomino and buckskin are not acceptable colors for the Holsteiner.

=== Temperament ===
Holsteiners vary in temperament, ranging from calm and docile to sensitive and easily startled. Certain bloodlines, including that of Capitol I, are known for their generally manageable temperament. The breed includes steady, cooperative horses suited to amateur riders, as well as more sensitive and energetic horses suited to experienced riders and competitive sport. Holsteiners are often described as balanced, reliable, courageous, and possessing a steady temperament. Some critics of the breed argue that selective breeding for jumping performance has, in certain bloodlines, reduced rideability despite producing horses capable of competing at higher levels.

== Breed history ==
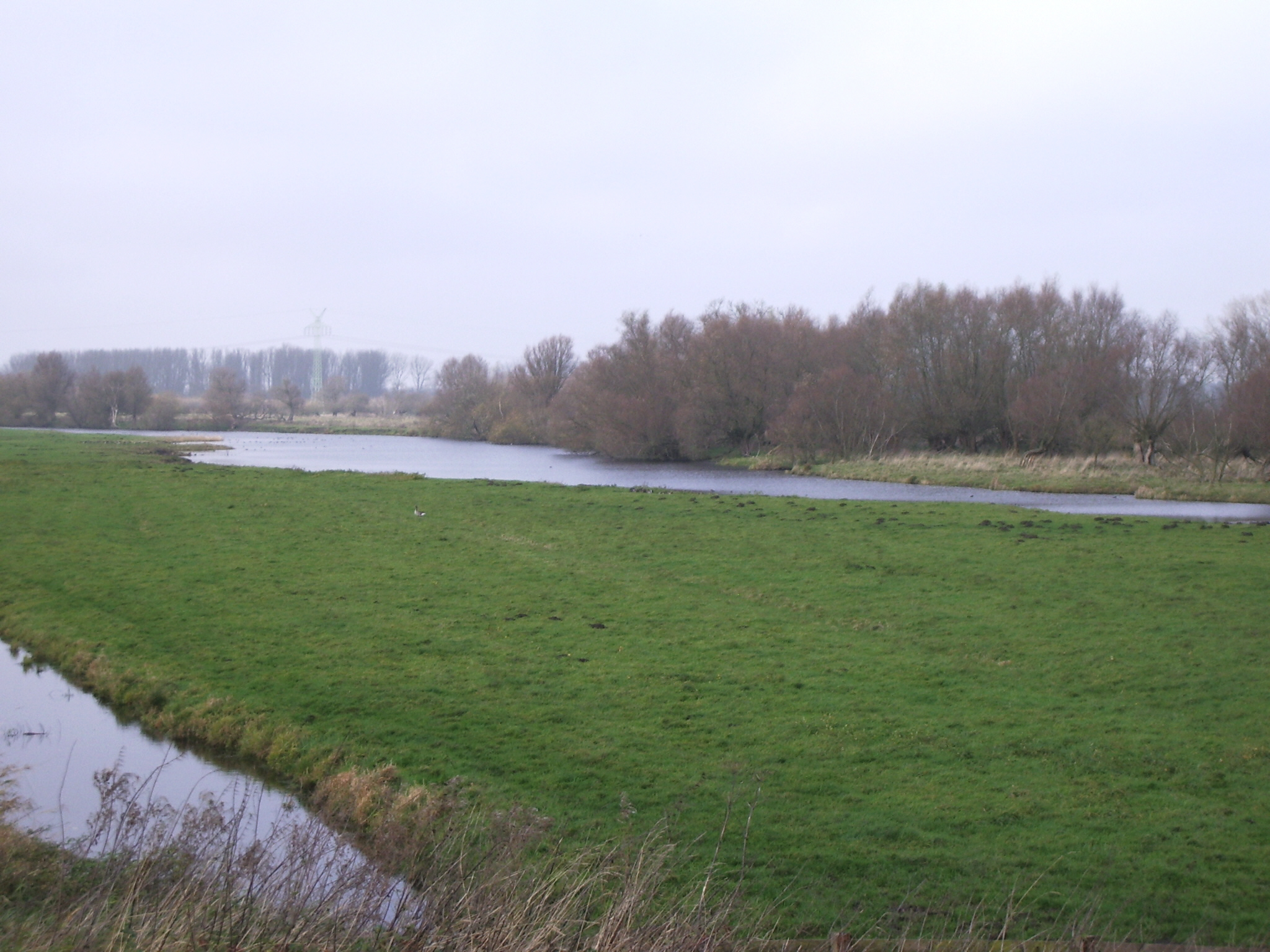
The Haseldorf Marsh of Schleswig-Holstein

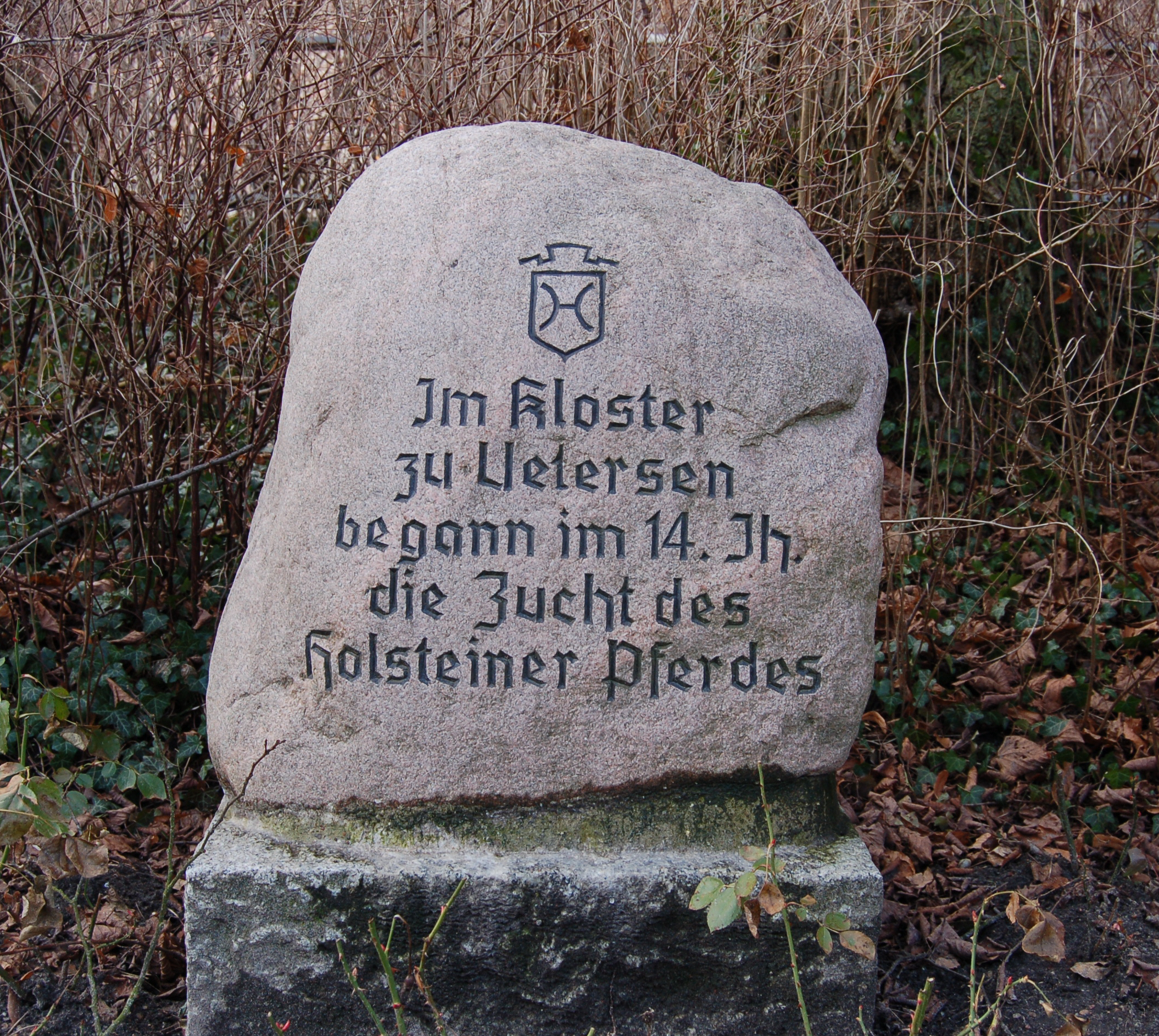
"The breeding of Holsteiner horses began in the 14th century at Uetersen monastery"

The Holsteiner breed has been bred in the northernmost region of Germany, Schleswig-Holstein, for over 700 years. The windswept coastal marshes where the breed originated are characterized by rich, wet soil that could dry out and turn concrete-like in a matter of hours. Since the first century, these fertile marshes were said to be home to an autochthonous horse that was small and suited to the climate.

Organized horse breeding in Holstein was first conducted in the monasteries of Uetersen. Monks were frequently the most literate members of Middle Ages societies, so accurate record-keeping depended on them. From the small native horses of the Haseldorf marshes, the Uetersen monks began to develop larger horses suitable for riding in times of war, and for agriculture in the demanding environment.

As knightly combat gave way to the cavalry, horses used in warfare required more endurance and agility. Similar to other quality European horses of the time, the popularity of Neapolitan and Spanish horses were reflected in the Holsteiner. While not exceptionally tall, they had thick, high-set necks, animated gaits, and Roman noses. King Philip II of Spain routinely purchased Holsteiners to populate his stud at Cordoba. Following the Protestant Reformation, the breeding of horses was no longer the responsibility of the monks, but of local officials and individual farmers. As early as 1719, the state offered awards to the finest stallions bred by Holstein farmers. To qualify, the stallion had to be between four and 15 years old, stand at least 15.2 hands and have sired at least 15 foals in the previous season. Twelve black Holsteiner stallions were purchased for the foundation of Celle State Stud in 1735. These horses became the foundation of the Hanoverian breed.

=== Nineteenth century ===
The 19th century brought a change to European horse breeding: compact and powerful horses were replaced by the fleet English Thoroughbred as the primary animals used to improving local horse breeds. Improvements in roads and the development of the locomotive meant long coach rides were less often required. As a result, the emphasis fell on producing elegant, attractive carriage horses. Cleveland Bays and their Thoroughbred-infused relatives, Yorkshire Coach Horses, were imported from Britain to refine the Holsteiner, but the breed still maintained an even temperament. The same organizational efforts that enabled the construction of railways and better roads also affected horse breeding. In the 1860s, the state-owned stud farm (Landgestüt) at Traventhal was established under the Prussian Stud Administration. Traventhal, like other state studs, provided local private horse breeders with affordable access to high-quality stallions. The Duke of Augustenburg was particularly influential, importing fine Thoroughbred stallions and encouraging locals to use them. In 1885, Claus Hell Senior authored a breeding goal for the Holsteiner horse:

A refined, powerful carriage horse with strong bone structure and high, ground covering strides, which at the same time should possess all the qualities of a heavy riding horse.

The Holsteiner stud book was founded by economic advisor Georg Ahsbahs in 1891, and within five years he helped to found the Elmshorn Riding and Driving School. This establishment, which is today home to the Verband sires, was the first such school in the world. Assignment of each mare family a stem number (stamm) was practiced even in the very beginning, and has allowed breeders to track the performance of female families. So well-organized and well-protected were the 19th century Holsteiners that one of the Thoroughbred sires imported by the Duke of Augustenburg is represented by several modern descendants.

=== Twentieth century ===
The early 20th century brought about significant changes for the Holstein horses and their breeders. World War I and World War II resulted in increased demand for powerful horses to pull the artillery wagons. In 1926, the Federation of Horse Breeders of the Holsteiner Marshes were made to turn over their stallions to the state stud, which redistributed the sires. These stallions were soon supplemented by those belonging to another regional breeders' association, as two local societies merged in 1935 to create today's Holsteiner verband.

After World War II, the mare population in 1950 was near 10,000; 11 years later, this number fell by over a third. In that decade, farmers had abandoned the breeding of horses, and the State Stud of Traventhal was dissolved. Instead of allowing the agricultural horses to die out as a breed, the Board of Directors of the breeders' federation purchased 30 Holsteiner stallions and three Thoroughbreds and completely reshaped the breeding direction. (Note: von Thun-Hohenstein, Romdeio Graf. The Holsteiner Horse. "Instead of simply giving up and allowing the breed to wither away as a victim of economic development, the dynamic Board of Directors decided to totally reshape the horse which had been entrusted to them. The work clothes and habits of the hard working rural labourer were to be traded in for the custom tailored suits and elegant manners of the international athlete. This all had to be accomplished without relinquishing indispensable physical and mental strength and natural talent of the robust country boy." Via Chris Hector. "A Journey through Holstein – Part Three") Former state stallions were now owned by the breeders' association, a completely unique arrangement among German warmblood breeding societies. To accomplish the updating of the Holsteiner, several Thoroughbred and French stallions were imported. By 1976, most of the top Holsteiner stallions were Thoroughbred or half-Thoroughbred. The new style Holsteiners were more agile, quicker, taller, and had better jumping technique. These changes have been especially important over the 15 to 20 years, as riding sport has left the realm of male professionals and soldiers, and become dominated by women and girls who ride as a leisure activity. To meet the needs of this new market, today's Holsteiners have been made more rideable, more beautiful, and more refined.

Methods of arriving at this goal have changed, too. In the past, sires were assigned to stallion depots to bring them closer to the mares that would benefit from them. Today, most breeders use artificial insemination, so the Verband-owned stallions reside at the central stud in Elmshorn. The mares, though, have often remained with small farmers who do not derive their income solely from horse-breeding.

=== Influential sires ===
Warmblood breeds, including the Holsteiner, are modeled to meet the demands of the market, and are never stagnant. When agile cavalry horses were required, Iberian horses from Spain and Naples were used; when flashier coach horses were in demand, the Yorkshire Coach horse contributed its genes. Following World War II, the farm horse gave way to the leisure riding horse and sport horse. Holstein breeders have achieved their aims in the past century with the use of Thoroughbred, Anglo-Arab, and Anglo-Norman sires. The mare base with which breeders were working was of heavy warmblood type. They were calm and sensible, with great depth and breadth but also with elegance, quality and active gaits suitable for coaching. (Note: von Thun-Hohenstein, Romdeio Graf. The Holsteiner Horse. "Let it be said that Ethelbert 1197, particularly through his grandsons, had a lasting effect on the modelling of the Holsteiner. They gave the Holsteiner elegance and sparkle, and they brilliantly succeeded in demonstrating the synthesis of the central breeding goal: substance combined with quality" Via "Sinaeda") Holsteiners of this era lacked elasticity and athleticism for dressage, and were heavy and slow off the ground over fences. Therefore, the influences due to selection for pulling power had to be systematically eliminated.

- Ramzes AA (1937–1965) gray Anglo-Arabian, 166 cm (Rittersporn xx – Shagya X-3 – Bakszysz ox)

Bred in Poland. This homozygous gray stallion, with a Thoroughbred sire and Shagya Arabian dam, was among the three most important German sires in the early years. He was leased to the state stud of Neuendorf for the 1951, 1952, 1959 and 1960 breeding seasons. Intermittently, he was sent to Westphalia, where he founded the male line that lead to the influential dressage sire, Rubinstein. In Holstein, though, Ramzes AA produced international caliber jumpers Retina, Ramona and Romanus. A full sister to Romanus, Vase produced fourteen foals for Holstein including the top stallions Maurus and Montreal. Most importantly for Holstein, Ramzes AA sired Raimond, the sire of Ramiro, the "Stallion of the Century".

- Anblick xx (1938–1964) dark bay or brown Thoroughbred, 161 cm (Ferro xx – Herold xx – Nuage xx)

Bred at Graditz State Stud. Anblick xx was the first post-World War II refining sire. In comparison to their dams, his offspring were lighter-boned, exceptionally good movers, game and bold over fences. Anblick xx left 14 approved sons and 49 broodmares. His best son was Aldato, maternal grandsire of Landgraf. He also sired the horses Antoinette and Venetia, who competed at the Olympics.

- Cottage Son xx (1944–1964) black or brown Thoroughbred, 164 cm (Young Lover xx – Cottage xx – Speed xx)

Bred in England. Cottage Romance represented both Great Britain and his sire, Cottage Son xx, in eventing at the 1960 Rome Olympics. The year before, Cottage Son xx had been sent to Elmshorn to cross on heavier Holsteiner mares. The State Stud of Traventhal was being dissolved, as horse breeding had stagnated. As an upgrader, Cottage Son xx produced good riding horses with willing, honest temperaments. His daughters were exceptional, producing the likes of Lord and Ramiro. He left 53 broodmares and 14 approved sons, and the best among them was Consul. However, this Thoroughbred's lasting influence is felt primarily through his great-grandson Capitol I and through female families today.

- Marlon xx (1958–1981) bay Thoroughbred, 164 cm (Tamerlane xx – Fairford xx – Knight of the Garter xx)

Bred in Ireland. Marlon xx sired horses that were structurally correct with great gaits, with tough, competitive characters and mental endurance. He was an especially good sire of Eventing horses, including Madrigal, who at the Montreal Olympics garnered an individual bronze medal and team silver medal. His grandsire Persian Gulf xx is half-brother to Precipitation xx, the sire of Furioso xx. His son Montevideo was a member of the West German gold medal dressage team in the 1984 Olympics. He left 43 States Premium mares among countless broodmares, and 21 approved sons including Dutch sire Kommandeur (formerly Manchester) and Danish model sire Martell.

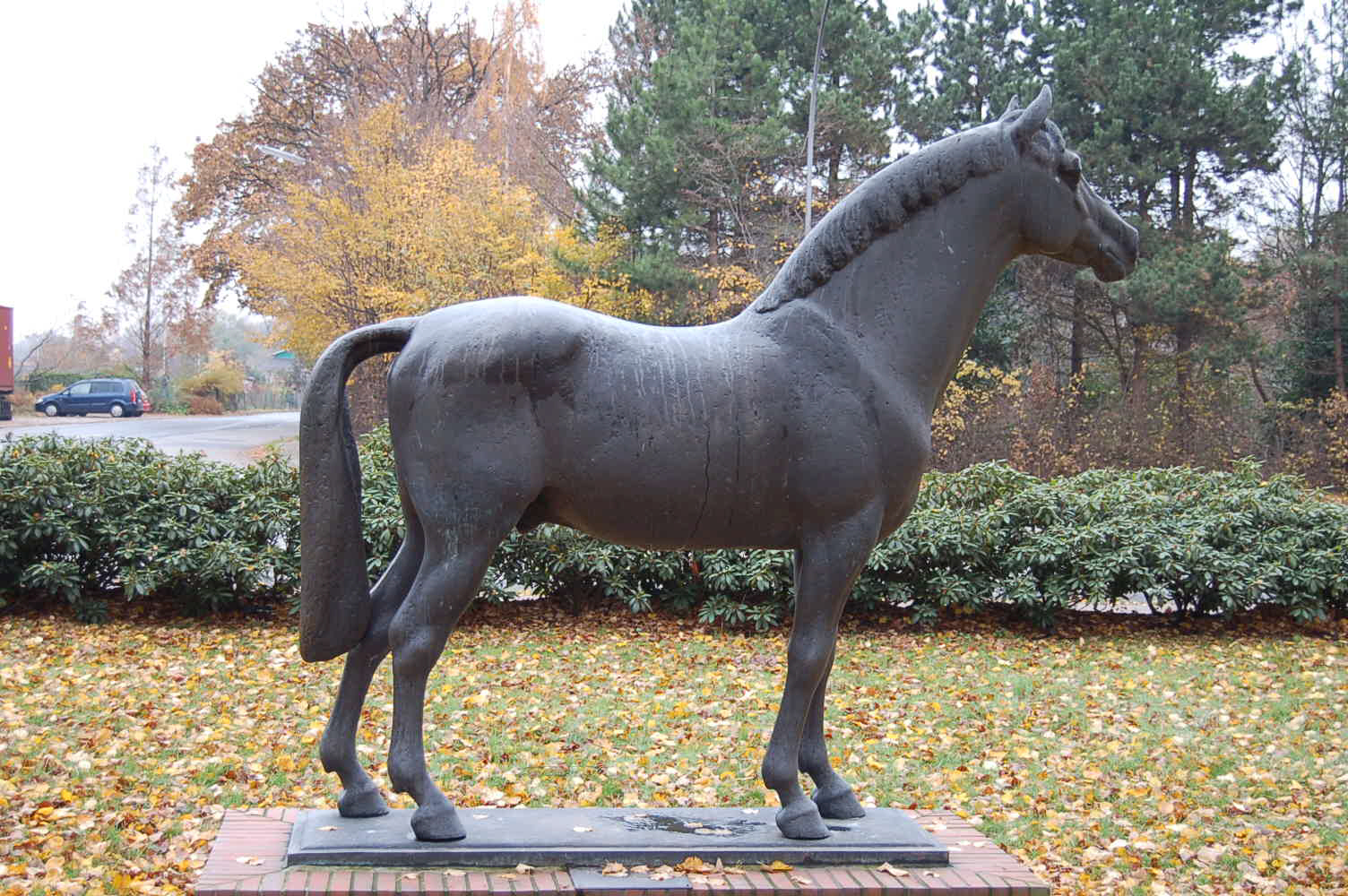
This statue of the Ladykiller's son, Landgraf, stands in Elmshorn before the riding hall.

- Ladykiller xx (1961–1979) bay Thoroughbred, 164 cm (Sailing Light xx – Loaningdale xx – Apron xx)

Bred in England. Ladykiller xx was powerful and masculine, striking, correct and considered very attractive, with a quality head. His type, rather open loins and high-set, crested neck, are all common features of the Holsteiner breed. As a sire, he reproduced not only his handsome looks, but gaits, strong character, kind temperament, and above all, great jumping technique. His best sons, among the many, were Lord and Landgraf I. Ladykiller xx is responsible for the frequency with which warmblood names begin with the letter "L".

- Cor de la Bryére (1968–2000) dark bay Selle Français, 166 cm (Rantzau xx – Lurioso – Landau)

Bred in France. The importation of Cor de la Bryére, commonly "Corde", was sparked by the success of his two cousins in Oldenburg, Furioso II and Futuro. They shared their sire, Furioso xx, with Lurioso, Corde's maternal grandsire. It is difficult to overstate Corde's influence on the breeding of jumping horses. With sophistication of technique, elasticity and bascule, and an endless spring, Corde brought to Holstein breeders exactly what they needed. His list of descendants in jumping sport is extensive. Additionally, Corde's offspring were easy to ride and kind with well-balanced canters. His sons include Caletto I, Caletto II, Caletto III, Calypso I, Calypso II, Calypso III, Calypso IV, Corrado I, Corde-Star and Cordalmé Z.

Holsteiner breeders today rarely add in foreign blood, and allow upgrading stallions based on their proven ability to contribute to the genepool. Other important sires for the Holsteiner breed include Almé Z, especially through his son Quidam de Revel, and Bachus Z, son of the Shagya Arabian Bajar.

== Uses ==
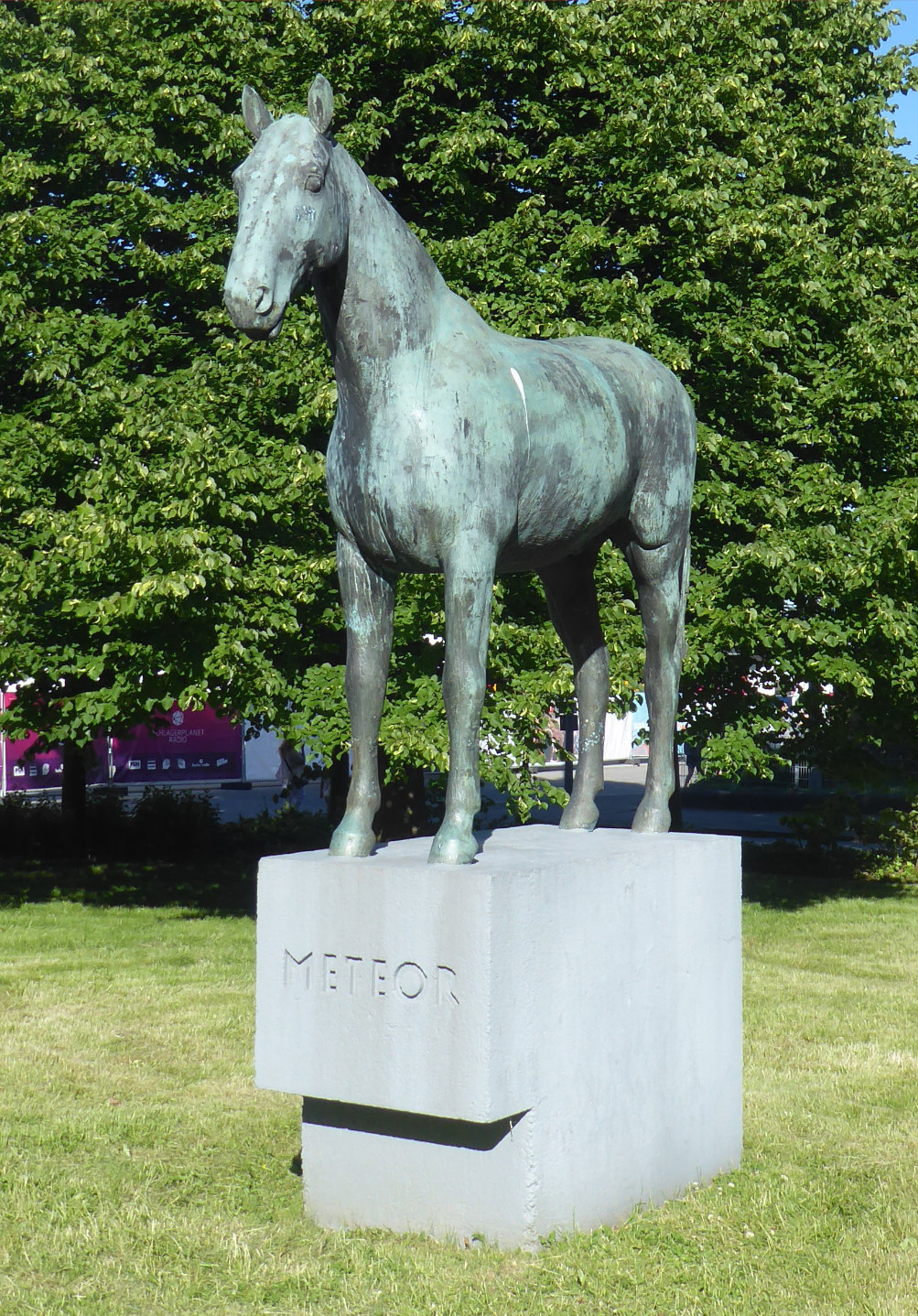
Sculpture of the Holsteiner jumper, Meteor, in Schleswig-Holstein's capital city of Kiel

Although Holsteiners make up only 6% of the total European horse population, they represent a large proportion of successful show jumpers in particular. Holsteiners are also excellent show hunters and hunt seat equitation horses in North America, and there are numbers of Holsteiners on the international scene in dressage, eventing, and combined driving.

The Holsteiner studbook was ranked No. 3 in international show jumping by the World Breeding Federation for Sport Horses (WBFSH) in 2008. Furthermore, the 2008 WBFSH rankings of top 30 sires of show jumpers were dominated by Holsteiners: No. 6 Caretino, No. 8 Libero H, No. 11 Cassini, No. 13 Calido, No. 17 Carthago, No. 18 Contender, No. 19 Corrado I, No. 20 Calvados, No. 28 Corland, No. 29 Acord II. Olympic medalists in show jumping, bearing the Holsteiner brand include Cedric and Carlsson vom Dach (team gold, Beijing), In Style (team silver, Beijing), Nobless M and Cantus (team bronze, Beijing), Fein Cera (team gold, Athens), Cardento and Magic Bengtsson (team silver, Athens), Cöster (team bronze, Athens), Cento (team bronze, Athens and team gold, Sydney), Calvaro V (team silver, Sydney), Classic Touch (individual gold, Barcelona), Orchidee (team gold, Seoul), Robin (team gold, Munich), and Trophy (team gold, Munich and team silver, Montreal).

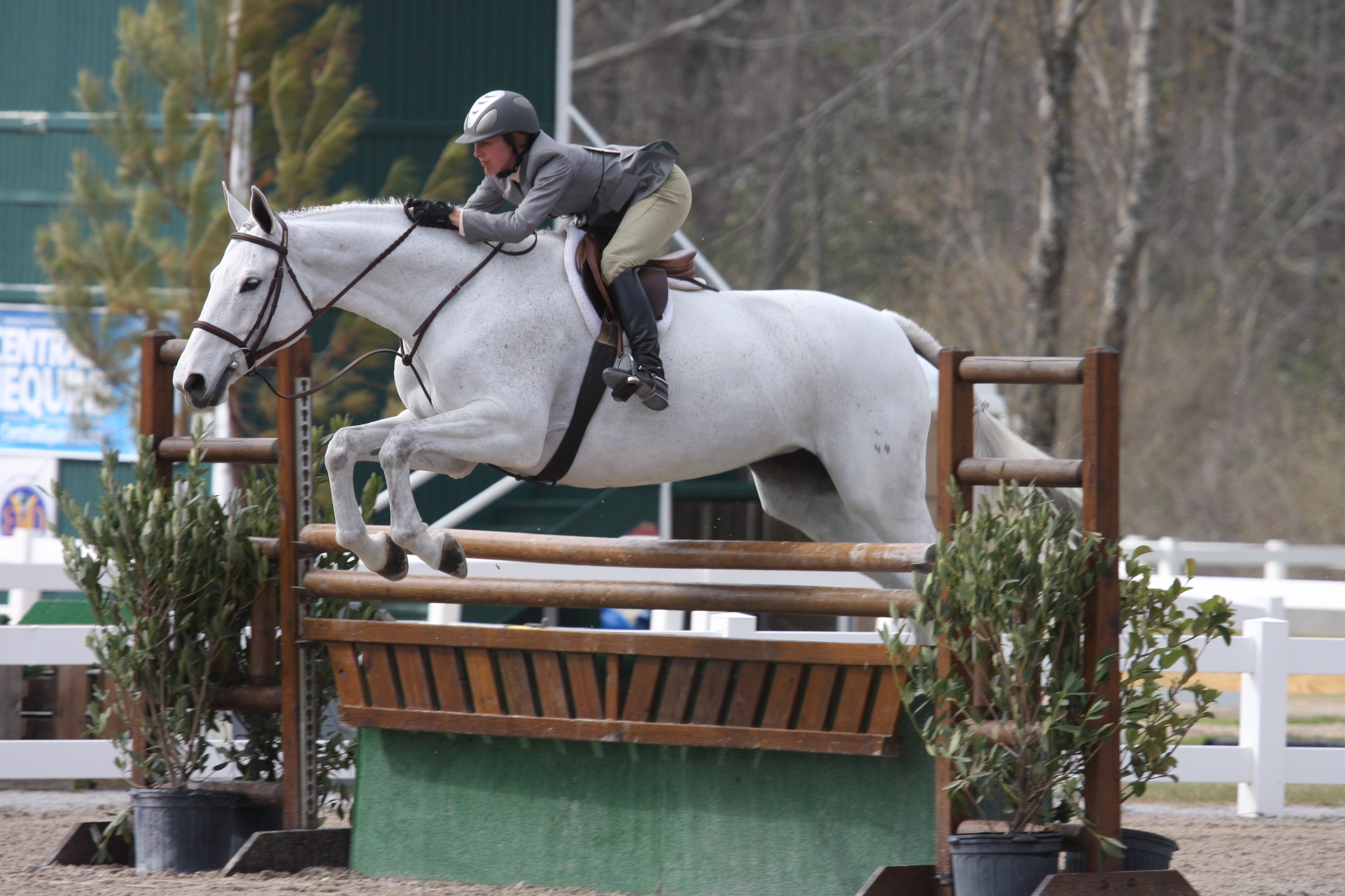
In the United States, Holsteiners can be successful show hunters.

In North America, Holsteiners are often employed as top-quality show hunters. Of the top 20 sires of hunters listed by the USEF in 2008, Holsteiners were again dominant: No. 1 Cheenook, No. 3 Cassini I, No. 6 Acorado I, No. 9 Come Back II, No. 11 Acord II, No. 13 Coriano, No. 15 Carano, No. 16 Hemmingway, No. 19 Burggraaf. The 2008 No. 1 Regular Working Hunter was Cunningham, a Holsteiner.

Holsteiners that reach the upper echelons of dressage are less common, but do exist. Successive generations of selection for jumping power have given most Holsteiners a powerful "engine." The studbook was ranked No. 8 in international dressage by the World Breeding Federation for Sporthorses in 2008. Cheenook, mentioned above as the No. 1 sire of USEF Hunters in 2008, competed up to Intermediare I dressage and participated twice in the German Federal Dressage Horse Championships. Holsteiners currently competing in international dressage include Liebling II (Lorentin I), Amicelli (Amigo), The Lion King B (Landos), Lanzaro (Lavall I), Samsung Cinque Cento (Cambridge), and Jamiro Rosso (Caletto). Holstein's impact on dressage is not limited to these horses. The No. 6 sire of international dressage horses, Flemmingh, had two Holsteiner parents: Lacapo, a Landgraf son, and Texas, a Carneval daughter. True to his ancestry, Flemmingh is known for producing knee action. Also on the list of top sires of FEI dressage horses are No. 14 Contango, who stands in the United States, and No. 25 Carpaccio. Like Cheenook, Carpaccio was also sired by Caretino. Holsteiners to prove themselves at the Olympic level include both the gold medal in the individual competition at the 1976 Montreal Olympics, won by Granat. The Marlon xx son, Montevideo, was a member of the gold medal-winning dressage team in 1984.

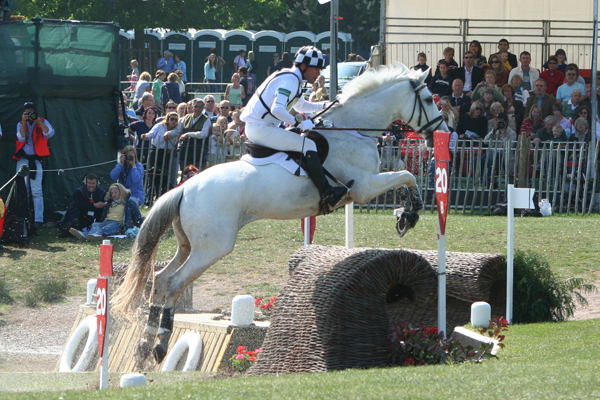
Hinrich Romeike on Holsteiner Marius in 2007; the pair went on to win the gold medal in eventing at the 2008 Beijing Olympics

Most Holsteiners with the speed to succeed in eventing have a Thoroughbred sire. As a studbook, they are ranked No. 6 based on performances in international eventing. This point was highlighted in 2008 when Marius, a Holsteiner by Condrieu xx, won the individual gold medal in Beijing. Holsteiners Madrigal and Albrant have won individual bronze and team silver, and team silver, respectively. Holsteiners currently competing in FEI eventing include Sundancer (Sunset Boulevard xx), ADM. V. Schneider (Sir Shostakov xx), So Lonely (Salient xx), Master Boy (Martel xx), and Coolroy Piter (Caretino).

A small but significant number of Holsteiners continue their historical roles in harness by competing in the sport of combined driving. The 1976 World Championship in Combined Driving was won by Emil Jung and 4 Holsteiners.

== See also ==
- List of German horse breeds
