= Indoor Brabant =

International horse show held each March in 's-Hertogenbosch, Netherlands

The Dutch Masters Indoor Brabant
- Status: Active
- Genre: Equestrian
- Frequency: Annually in March
- Venue: Brabanthallen
- Location: 's-Hertogenbosch
- Country: Netherlands
- Inaugurated: 1966

The Dutch Masters, formerly known as Indoor Brabant is an international horse show held in 's-Hertogenbosch, Netherlands. The show is held every year in March and one of the biggest international equestrian indoor events in The Netherlands, besides Jumping Amsterdam. Indoor Brabant-The Dutch Masters takes place in the Brabanthallen.

== The event ==
The event is host of the FEI World Cup qualifier dressage and the prestigious Grand Slam of Show Jumping combination with shows and entertainment. The show-jumping includes the 5* CSI Grand Prix. Besides the World Cup dressage, several CDI competitions are part of the event. The program also includes national dressage classes and a class for para-equestrian riders.

== History ==
The first edition of Indoor Brabant was in 1966, founded by a group of local people from Tilburg to honor show-jumper Toon Ebben. The founders Ton Jansen, Harrie van Dijk and Henk Brands wanted to organize the new international horse show in Tilburg but there was no space available so the three men found a location in The Brabanthallen in 's-Hertogenbosch. Because the men were from Tilburg, the mayor of 's-Hertogenbosch wanted to have someone from the city itself to be president of the show. Daddy Stibbe, father of Eddy Stibbe became the president of Indoor Brabant and was able to create a successful event from the beginning. In 1979 Indoor Brabant became part of the World Cup Jumping circuit. In 1983 dressage was added to the event's program and became part of the World Cup Dressage circuit in 1986, hosting the first World Cup Final for dressage riders in history. The final was won by Danish Anne Grethe Jensen. The dressage World Cup Final took place for eleven times at Indoor Brabant, while the organization hosted the World Cup final for show-jumping two times in 1994 and 2012. Since 2014 In 2017 the organization decided to change the name 'Indoor Brabant' to 'The Dutch Masters' to attract a bigger international audience since the show became part of the Grand Slam.

Because of the COVID-19 pandemic the event was cancelled in 2020. In 2020 the organization had to cancel last minute, even though the show was about to start. On the first day of the event, the Dutch prime-minister Mark Rutte gave a press conference and decided to cancel all current events. Also in 2001 the show was cancelled because of a swine fever. In 2021 the event took place without spectators and had only show-jumping on the program.

== Winners ==
The list of winners includes the winner of the Grand Prix in show-jumping, which is not the World Cup. From 1979 until 1985 there was no Grand Prix and was replaced by the World Cup. The World Cup jumping has been part of the program since 1979 until 2013, including two World Cup Finals won by Dutch Jos Lansink in 1994 and American Rich Fellers in 2012. The Grand Prix of 's-Hertogenbosch was replaced by the Grand Slam from 2014 onwards.The dressage winners includes also the winners of the World Cup Finals, which replaced the World Cup Grand Prix qualifier.

Year	Show-Jumping	Dressage
1967	(Republic of Ireland) Seamus Hayes on Doneraile	No Dressage
1968	(United Kingdom) Harvey Smith on O’Malley	No Dressage
1969	(Brazil) Lucia Faria on Rush du Camp	No Dressage
1970	(Germany) Alwin Schockemöhle on Donald Rex	No Dressage
1971	(United Kingdom) Ann Backhouse-Townsend on Cardinal	No Dressage
1972	(United Kingdom) Harvey Smith on Evan Jones	No Dressage
1973	(Germany) Fritz Ligges on Genius	No Dressage
1974	(Germany) Hendrik Snoek on Rasputin	No Dressage
1975	(Austria) Hugo Simon on Lavendel	No Dressage
1976	(United Kingdom) David Broome on Jägermeister	No Dressage
1977	(Netherlands) Johan Heins on Seven Valleys Z	No Dressage
1978	(Germany) Fritz Ligges on Goya	No Dressage
1979	(United Kingdom) David Broome on Philco	No Dressage
1980	(Austria) Hugo Simon on Gladstone	No Dressage
1981	(France) Gilles Bertrand de Balanda on Galoubet A	No Dressage
1982	(Netherlands) Rob Ehrens on Oscar Drum	No Dressage
1983	(Belgium) Edgar Henri Cuepper on Cyrano	No Dressage
1984	(Switzerland) Thomas Fuchs on Willow	No Dressage
1985	(United Kingdom) Harvey Smith on Sanyo Technology	No Dressage
1986	(Republic of Ireland) Peter Charles on Merrimandias	(Denmark) Anne Grethe Jensen on Marzog (Final)
1987	(United Kingdom) Nick Skelton on Raffles Airborne	(Germany) Herbert Krug on Muscadeur
1988	(Germany) Ludger Beerbaum on Landlord	(Switzerland) Christine Stückelberger on Gaugin de Lully (Final)
1989	(United Kingdom) Nick Skelton on Grand Slam	(United Kingdom) Jennie Loriston-Clarke on Dutch Gold
1990	(United Kingdom) Nick Skelton on Top Gun	(Germany) Sven Rothenberger on Andiamo (Final)
1991	(Netherlands) Jos Lansink on Libero H	(Germany) Sven Rothenberger on Andiamo
1992	(France) Eric Navet on Rosire HN	(Germany) Monica Theodorescu on Grunox
1993	(Netherlands) Jos Lansink on Henzo	(Germany) Monica Theodorescu on Ganimedes (Final)
1994	(Republic of Ireland) Eddie Macken on Sky View	No Dressage
1995	(Germany) Ludger Beerbaum on Ratina Z	(Netherlands) Anky van Grunsven on Bonfire
1996	(Netherlands) Jos Lansink on Lianos	(Netherlands) Anky van Grunsven on Bonfire
1997	(Germany) Franke Sloothaak on Joly	(Netherlands) Anky van Grunsven on Bonfire (Final)
1998	(Germany) Ralf Schneider on Chopin	(Netherlands) Anky van Grunsven on Bonfire
1999	(Belgium) Ludo Philippaerts on Droite d’ Nirel	(Netherlands) Anky van Grunsven on Bonfire
2000	(Italy) Jerry Smit on Cassandro	(Netherlands) Anky van Grunsven on Bonfire (Final)
2001	Cancelled due to swine fever
2002	(United States) Leslie Howard on Priobert de Kalvarie	(Germany) Ulla Salzgeber on Rusty
2003	(United Kingdom) Robert Smith on Marius Claudius	(Germany) Heike Kemmer on Bonaparte
2004	(Netherlands) Gert-Jan Bruggink on Joël	(Netherlands) Anky van Grunsven on Salinero
2005	(Germany) Marcus Ehning on Gitania	(Netherlands) Anky van Grunsven on Salinero
2006	(Netherlands) Albert Zoer on Okidoki	(Netherlands) Anky van Grunsven on Salinero
2007	(Germany) Daniel Deusser on Air Jordan Z	(Germany) Isabell Werth on Warum Nicht FRH
2008	(Switzerland) Daniel Etter on Peu a Peu	(Netherlands) Anky van Grunsven on Salinero (Final)
2009	(Netherlands) Albert Zoer on Sam	(Germany) Isabell Werth on Satchmo
2010	(France) Kevin Staut on Silvana HDC	(Netherlands) Edward Gal on Totilas (Final)
2011	(Netherlands) Albert Zoer on Sam	(Netherlands) Adelinde Cornelissen on Parzival
2012	(Netherlands) Marc Houtzager on Opium	(Netherlands) Adelinde Cornelissen on Parzival (Final)
2013	(Netherlands) Maikel van der Vleuten on Kisby	(Netherlands) Adelinde Cornelissen on Parzival
2014	(France) Kevin Staut on Silvana HDC	(Netherlands) Edward Gal on Undercover
2015	(Germany) Daniel Deusser on Cornet d’Amour	(Netherlands) Edward Gal on Undercover
2016	(Germany) Marcus Ehning on Cornado NRW	(Netherlands) Hans-Peter Minderhoud on Flirt
2017	(Netherlands) Leopold van Asten on Zidane N.O.P.	(Netherlands) Hans-Peter Minderhoud on Flirt
2018	(Belgium) Niels Bruynseels on Gancia de Muze	(Germany) Isabell Werth on Emilio 107
2019	(Sweden) Henrik von Eckermann on Toveks Mary Lou	(Denmark) Daniel Bachmann Andersen on Zack
2020	Cancelled due to the COVID-19 pandemic
2021	(Austria) Max Kühner on Elektric Blue P	No Dressage
2022	(Germany) Daniel Deusser on Scuderia 1918 Tobago Z	(Germany) Jessica von Bredow-Werndl on TSF Dalera BB
2023	(United States) McLain Ward on HH Azur	(United Kingdom) Charlotte Fry on Glamourdale
2024	(Netherlands) Willem Greve on Highway TN N.O.P.	(Germany) Isabell Werth on DSP Quantaz
2025	(France) Simon Delestre on Cayman Jolly Jumper	(United Kingdom) Charlotte Fry on Glamourdale
2026	(Germany) Richard Vogel on United Touch S	(Belgium) Justin Verboomen on Zonik Plus
