= Jumping Amsterdam =

International horse show held each January in Amsterdam, Netherlands

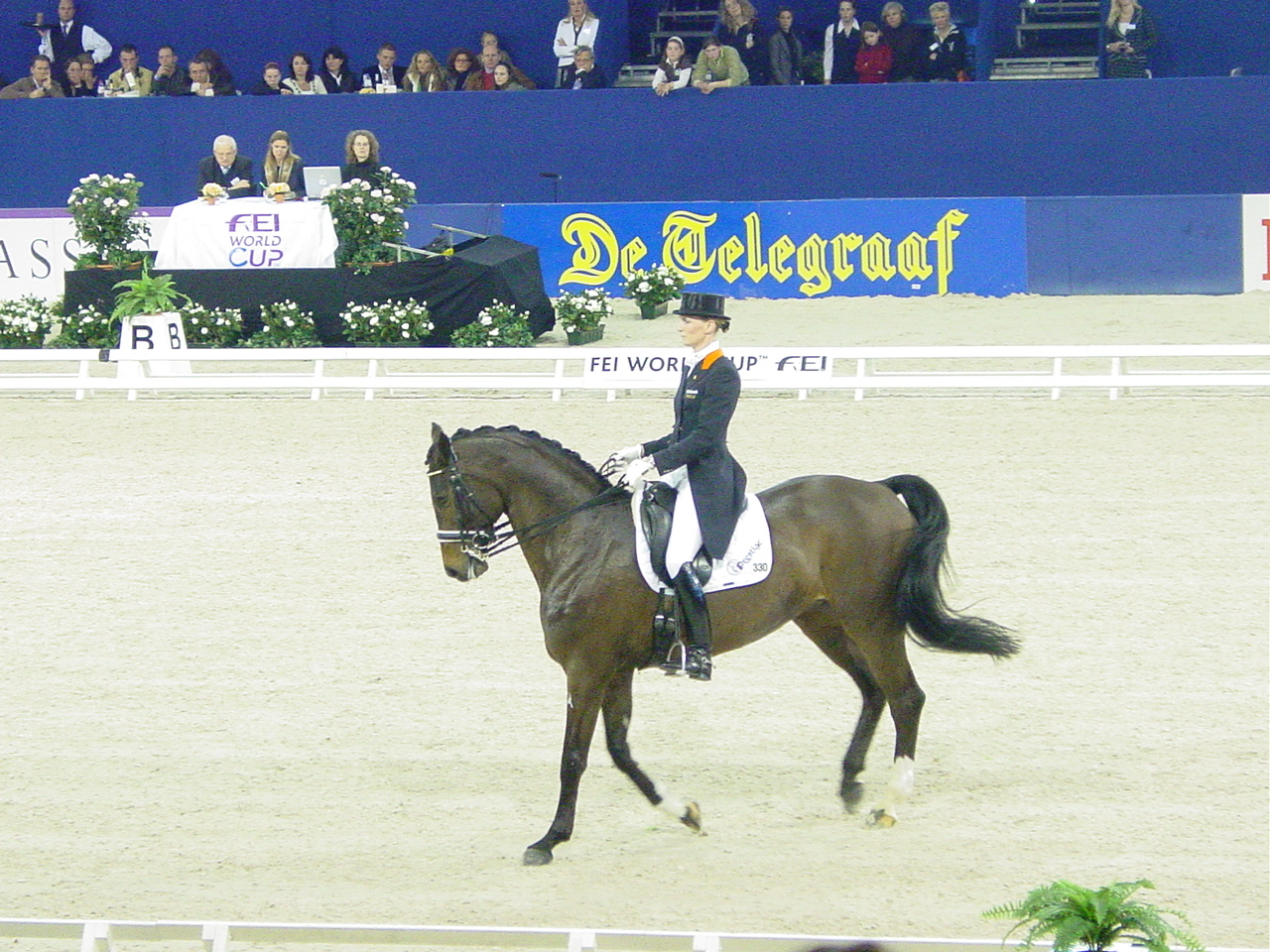
- World Cup Dressage at Jumping Amsterdam
- Status: Active
- Genre: Equestrian
- Frequency: Annually in January
- Venue: RAI Convention Centre
- Location: Amsterdam
- Country: Netherlands
- Inaugurated: 1958
- Founder: Ben Arts
- Attendance: Approx. 55.000

Jumping Amsterdam is an international horse show held in Amsterdam, Netherlands. The show is held every year in January and one of the biggest international equestrian indoor events in The Netherlands. Jumping Amsterdam takes place at the RAI Amsterdam Convention Centre in the city center of the Dutch capital.

== The event ==
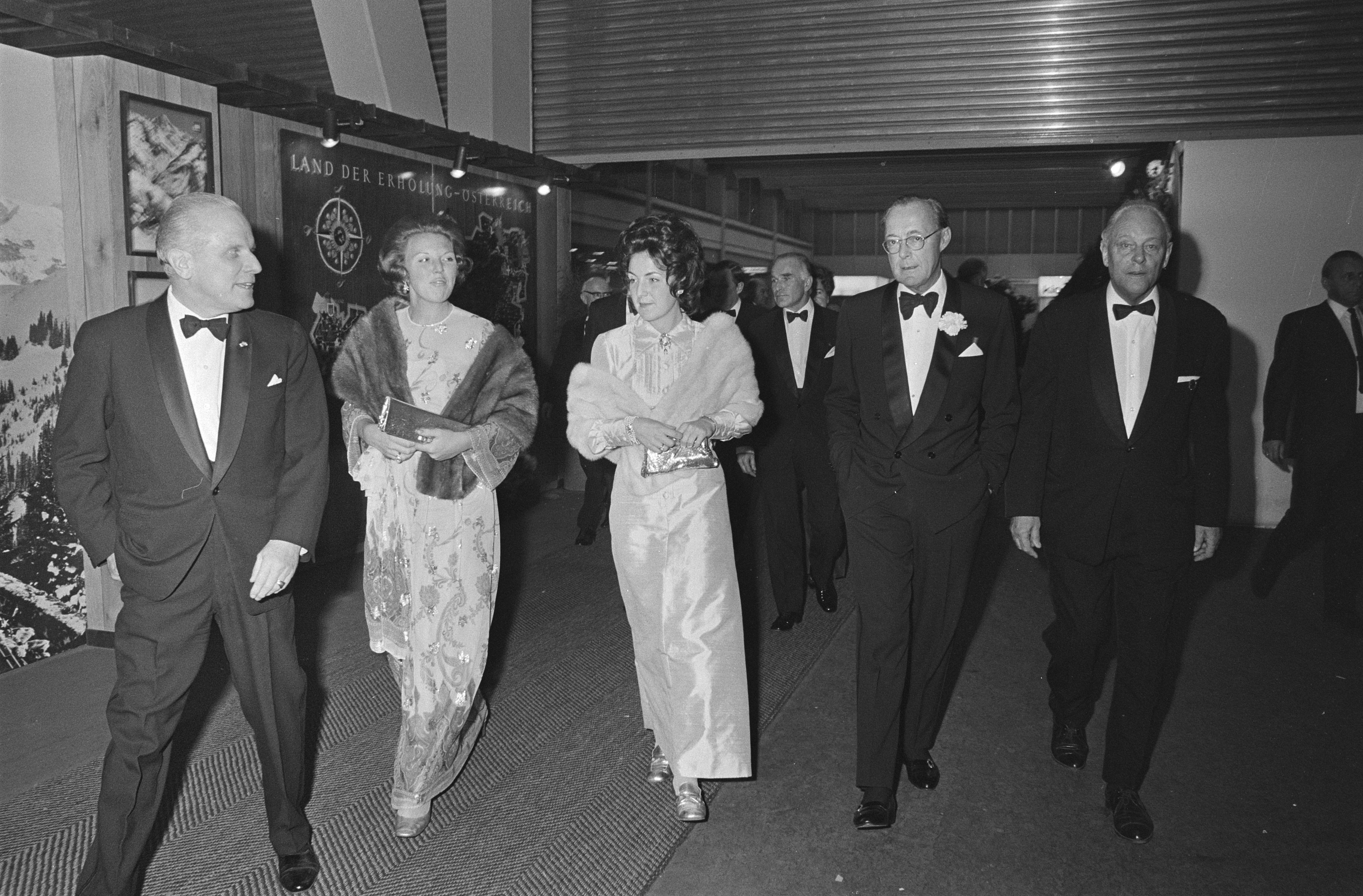
Prinsess Beatrix visiting Jumping Amsterdam in 1970

The event is well known for hosting the World Cup for show-jumping and dressage in combination with shows and entertainment. The show-jumping includes the 5* CSI World Cup alongside national classes, as well for dressage which includes the CDI World Cup. The program also includes national dressage for the youth and upcoming dressage horses in small tour and para-equestrian. Also the World Cup Driving was part of the program in the past. On Sunday morning the event hosts the 'Children's morning', with games and activities for the younger generation. Jumping Amsterdam is seen as one of the highest ranked indoor equestrian events in the world, recognized by the International Federation for Equestrian Sports.

The event is always eagerly attended by members of the Dutch royal family and several Dutch celebrities.

== History ==
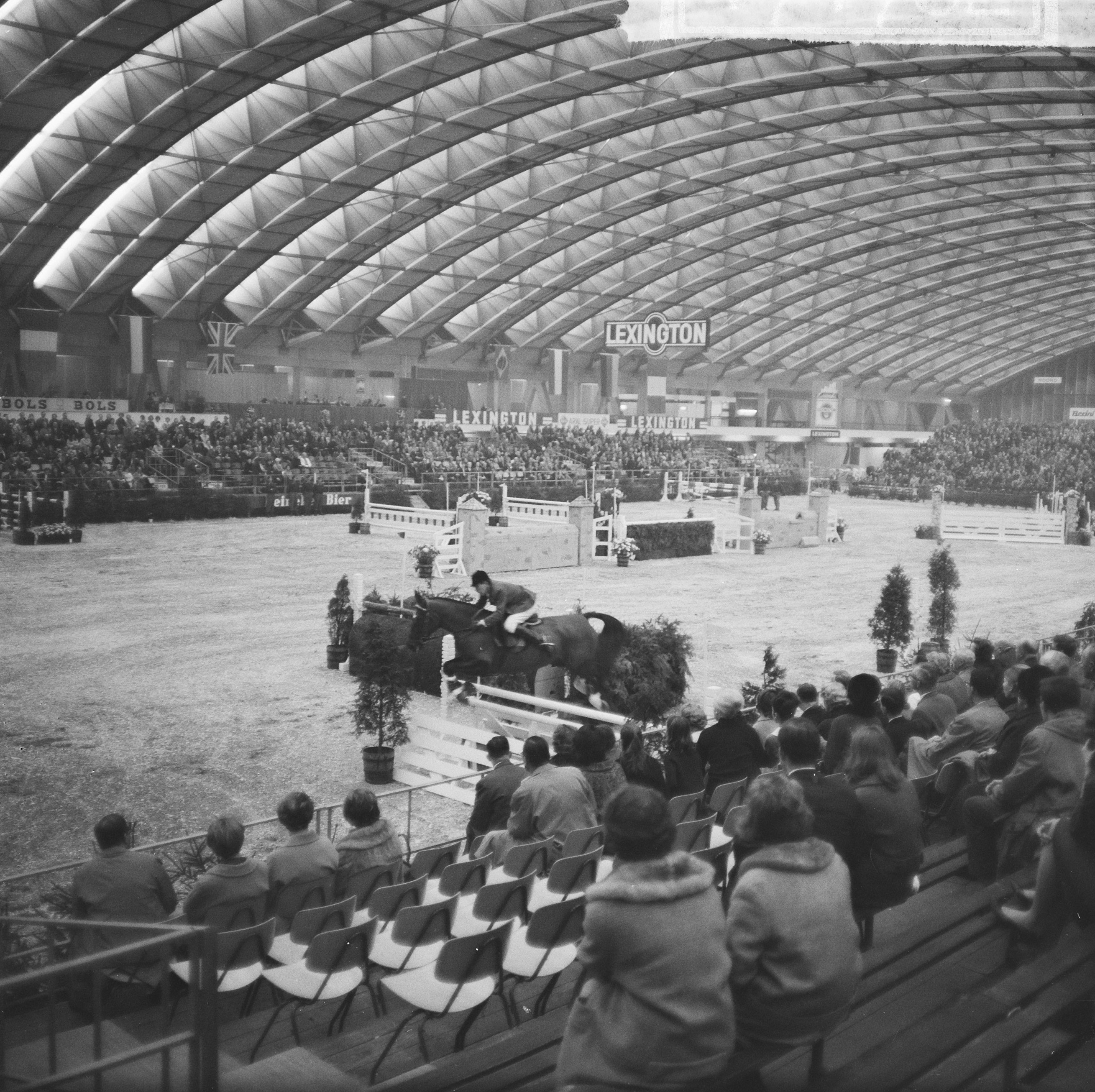
Jumping Amsterdam in 1964

The first edition of Jumping Amsterdam was in 1958 in the former RAI building. Initiator Ben Arts wanted to create a big equestrian event in the capital of The Netherlands and created the Jumping Amsterdam horse show. Nevertheless, Arts did not immediately succeed in convincing everyone, including Freddy Heineken to sponsor and Prince Bernhard of Lippe-Biesterfeld to be the patron of the event. The first edition was yet to be held in 1958 and immediately resulted in a successful event. In 1961 a new hall of RAI Amsterdam was built, the show moved to the new exhibition complex at Europaplein which resulted in a bigger event with more riders and spectators. In the mid 80's dressage was included in the program and became part of the World Cup in 1989. In 1994 the event expanded with an extra competition arena in the second 'Zuidhal', which made it possible for the organization to add more competitions and to welcome more spectators. In 2006 Jumping Amsterdam hosted the World Cup Finals for dressage, which was won by Dutch Olympic champion Anky van Grunsven.

Because of the COVID-19 pandemic the event was cancelled in 2021 and 2022. Also in 2002 and 2003 the event could not take place because of financial problems.

== Winners ==
The list of winners names the winner of the Grand Prix of Amsterdam in show-jumping and not the winner of World Cup qualifier in show-jumping. The World Cup jumping has been part of the program in 2000, 2001, 2004 and 2005 and in 2007 and 2008. The World Cup for show-jumping returned in 2019. The Grand Prix Dressage has been part of the program since 1989 and became part of the World Cup circuit the same year. In 2007 the event was part of the Driving World Cup circuit for only one year and was won by Dutch IJsbrand Chardon.

Year	Show-Jumping	Dressage
1958	(Netherlands) Harry Wouters van den Oudenweijer on Luetnant	No Dressage
1959	(France) Lt. Kol. M. Fresson on Grand Veneur	No Dressage
1960	(Germany) Hans Günter Winkler on Atoll	No Dressage
1961	(Italy) Piero D'Inzeo on Sunbeam	No Dressage
1962	(France) Alain Navet on Luma	No Dressage
1963	(Germany) Hans Günter Winkler on Romanus	No Dressage
1964	(United Kingdom) Harvey Smith on Harvester	No Dressage
1965	(Germany) Alwin Schockemöhle on Exact	No Dressage
1966	(Brazil) Nelson Pessoa on Nagir	No Dressage
1967	(Germany) Gerd Wildfang on Athlet	No Dressage
1968	(Italy) Raimondo D'Inzeo on Bellevue	No Dressage
1969	(Brazil) Nelson Pessoa on Nagir	No Dressage
1970	(Brazil) Nelson Pessoa on Nagir	No Dressage
1971	(Germany) Alwin Schockemöhle on The Robber	No Dressage
1972	(Germany) Alwin Schockemöhle on The Robber	No Dressage
1973	(Germany) Hartwig Steenken on Simona	No Dressage
1974	(Germany) Hartwig Steenken on Erle	No Dressage
1975	(United Kingdom) Malcolm Pyrah on Severn Valley	No Dressage
1976	(Germany) Sönke Sönksen on Kwept	No Dressage
1977	(Belgium) Christian Huysegoms on Catapult	No Dressage
1978	(Austria) Hugo Simon on Gladstone	No Dressage
1979	(United Kingdom) David Broome on Sportsman	No Dressage
1980	(Germany) Franke Sloothaak on Argonaut	No Dressage
1981	(Belgium) Edgar Cuepper on Cyrano	No Dressage
1982	(Netherlands) Rob Ehrens on Surprice	No Dressage
1983	(United Kingdom) David Broome on Last Resort	No Dressage
1984	(Switzerland) Willi Melliger on Beethoven II	No Dressage
1985	(United Kingdom) John Whitaker on Hopscotch	No Dressage
1986	(Netherlands) Wiljan Laarakkers on Up-To-Date	No Dressage
1987	(France) Pierre Durand on Jappeloup de Luze	No Dressage
1988	(Netherlands) Rob Ehrens on Olympic Sunrise	No Dressage
1989	(France) Herve Godignon on Moet Chandon La Belletiere	(Germany) Sven Rothenberger on Andiana
1990	(Netherlands) Jos Lansink on Optiebeurs Egano	(Soviet Union) Nina Menkova on Dikson
1991	(France) Eric Navet on Wait Quito de Baussy	(Germany) Sven Rothenberger on Ideaal
1992	(Netherlands) Piet Raymakers on Rinntou Z	(Germany) Monica Theodorescu on Ganimedes
1993	(Netherlands) Jos Lansink on Libero H	(Germany) Klaus Balkenhol on Goldstern
1994	(Germany) Ludger Beerbaum on Ratina Z	(Netherlands) Anky van Grunsven on Bonfire
1995	(Switzerland) Markus Fuchs on Interpane Adelfos	(Netherlands) Anky van Grunsven on Cameleon Cocktail
1996	(Netherlands) Jos Lansink on Bachus Z	(Germany) Isabell Werth on Welcome 082
1997	(Switzerland) Markus Fuchs on Interpane Adelfos	(Netherlands) Anky van Grunsven on TCN Partout
1998	(United Kingdom) Robert Smith on Senator for the Best	(Netherlands) Anky van Grunsven on TCN Partout
1999	(United States) Elise Haas on Mr. Blue	(Netherlands) Anky van Grunsven on Bonfire
2000	(Germany) Ludger Beerbaum on Goldfever 3	(Germany) Rudof Zeilinger on Livijno
2001	(United States) Leslie Howard on Priobert de Kalvarie	(Netherlands) Arjen Teeuwissen on Goliath T
2002	Cancelled due to financial problems
2003	Cancelled due to financial problems
2004	(Netherlands) Gerco Schröder on Monaco	(Netherlands) Anky van Grunsven on Salinero
2005	(Brazil) Rodrigo Pessoa on Sigane van de Grundeval	(Netherlands) Edward Gal on Lingh
2006	(United Kingdom) Michael Whitaker on Quidame des Hayettes Z	No Grand Prix qualifier, World Cup Finals instead
2007	(Netherlands) Maikel van der Vleuten on Audi's Parmala Douche	(Netherlands) Imke Schellekens-Bartels on Sunrise
2008	(Netherlands) Gert-Jan Bruggink on Sarantos	(Netherlands) Anky van Grunsven on Salinero
2009	(Republic of Ireland) Billy Twomey on Je t'aime Flamenco	(Netherlands) Anky van Grunsven on Painted Black
2010	(Republic of Ireland) Billy Twomey on Je t'aime Flamenco	(Netherlands) Edward Gal on Totilas
2011	(United Kingdom) Michael Whitaker on GIG Amai	(Netherlands) Adelinde Cornelissen on Parzival
2012	(Republic of Ireland) Jessica Kurten on Vincente	(Netherlands) Adelinde Cornelissen on Parzival
2013	(Netherlands) Frank Schuttert on Winchester H	(Germany) Helen Langehanenberg on Damon Hill NRW
2014	(United Kingdom) John Whitaker on Argento	(United Kingdom) Charlotte Dujardin on Valegro
2015	(Netherlands) Willem Greve on Carambole	(United Kingdom) Charlotte Dujardin on Valegro
2016	(Netherlands) Maikel van der Vleuten on Arera C	(Germany) Isabell Werth on Weihegold OLD
2017	(France) Patrice Delaveau on Lacrimoso 3	(Germany) Isabell Werth on Weihegold OLD
2018	(Netherlands) Marc Houtzager on Calimero	(Germany) Isabell Werth on Weihegold OLD
2019	(Sweden) Henrik von Eckermann on Toveks Mary Lou	(Germany) Isabell Werth on Weihegold OLD
2020	(Netherlands) Marc Houtzager on Sterrehof's Dante	(Germany) Isabell Werth on Weihegold OLD
2021	Cancelled due to the COVID-19 pandemic
2022	Cancelled due to the COVID-19 pandemic
2023	(France) Julien Epaillard on Donatello d'Auge	(Netherlands) Dinja van Liere on Hermes N.O.P.
2024	(France) Julien Epaillard on Dubai du Cedre	(United Kingdom) Charlotte Fry on Everdale
2025	(Belgium) Pieter Devos on Jarina J	(United Kingdom) Charlotte Fry on Glamourdale
