= 2017 in equestrianism =

== 2016–17 FEI World Cup Jumping ==
- April 9, 2016 – December 3, 2016: 2016 FEI World Cup Jumping – Japan League
  - Winner: (Japan) Jun Takada (with horse Zilvana Verte)
- April 22, 2016 – October 7, 2016: 2016 FEI World Cup Jumping – China League
  - Winner: (Hong Kong) Patrick Lam (with horse Al Capone)
- April 27, 2016 – June 19, 2016: 2016 FEI World Cup Jumping – Central Asian League
  - Winner: (Uzbekistan) Nurjon Tuyakbaev (with horse King Cornet L)
- April 28, 2016 – November 27, 2016: 2016 FEI World Cup Jumping – South America League
  - North SAL winner: (Venezuela) Noel Vanososte (with horse Conrad D)
  - South SAL winner: (Uruguay) Martin Rodriguez Vanni (with horse Liborius)
- April 29, 2016 – October 30, 2016: 2016 FEI World Cup Jumping – (South Africa) South African League
  - Winner: (South Africa) Lisa Williams (with horse Campbell)
- May 25, 2016 – September 25, 2016: 2016 FEI World Cup Jumping – Caucasus League
  - Winner: (Georgia (country)) Tornike Papiashvili (with horse Ambishen)
- May 12, 2016 – December 4, 2016: 2016 FEI World Cup Jumping – Central European League
  - North CEL winner: (Russia) Maria Bibikova (with horse Quasimodo)
  - South CEL winner: (Hungary) Gábor Szabó Jr. (with horse Timpex Bolcsesz)
  - February 23–26, 2017: 2017 FEI World Cup Jumping – Central European League Final in (Poland) Warsaw
    - Winner: (Poland) Dawid Kubiak
- July 27, 2016 – March 12, 2017 2016–17 FEI World Cup Jumping – North American League
  - Eastern NAL winner: (United States) Kent Farrington (with horses Gazelle, Creedance, and Voyeur)
  - Western NAL winner: (Egypt) Nayel Nassar (with horses Lordan and Acita 4)
- July 29, 2016 – January 22, 2017: 2016–17 FEI World Cup Jumping – (Australia) Australian League
  - Winner: (Australia) Clint Beresford (with horse Emmaville Jitterbug)
- September 30, 2016 – February 4, 2017: 2016–17 FEI World Cup Jumping – Arab League
  - Winner: (Qatar) Sheikh Ali Al-Thani (with horses Carolina 31, Imperio Egipcio Milton, and Come Soon)
- October 1, 2016 – December 25, 2016: 2016 FEI World Cup Jumping – South East Asian League
  - Winner: (Thailand) Jaruporn Limpichati (with horse Irregular Choice)
- October 13, 2016 – February 26, 2017: 2016–17 FEI World Cup Jumping – (European Union) Western European League
  - Winner: (France) Kevin Staut (with three different horses)
- October 19, 2016 – January 15, 2017: 2016–17 FEI World Cup Jumping – New Zealand League
  - Winner: (New Zealand) Katie Laurie (with horses Casebrooke Lomond & On the Point Eve)

== 2016–17 FEI World Cup Dressage ==
- April 13, 2016 – December 11, 2016: 2016 FEI World Cup Dressage – Central European League
  - Winner: (Russia) Inessa Merkulova with horse Mister X
- April 28, 2016 – October 2, 2016: 2016 FEI World Cup Dressage – North American League
  - Winner: (Canada) Jacqueline Brooks with horse D. Niro
- May 26, 2016 – March 12, 2017: 2016–17 FEI World Cup Dressage – Western European League
  - Winner: (Germany) Isabell Werth with horses Emilo, Don Johnson FRH, & Weihegold Old
- February 1–4: 2017 FEI World Cup Dressage – Pacific League
  - Winner: (New Zealand) Wendi Williamson with horse Déjà vu MH

== 2017 Show Jumping World Cup and Dressage World Cup Finals ==
- March 27 – April 2: 2017 FEI World Cup Show Jumping and Dressage Finals in (United States) Omaha, Nebraska
  - Winners: (United States) McLain Ward with horse HH Azur (show jumping) / (Germany) Isabell Werth with horse Weihegold (dressage)

== 2017 FEI Nations Cup Jumping ==
- February 14 – October 1: 2017 FEI Nations Cup Jumping Season
  - February 14–19: NCJ #1 in (United States) Ocala, Florida
    - Individual winners: (Republic of Ireland) Cian O'Connor (with horse Seringat), (United States) Beezie Madden (with horse Breitling LS), (Canada) Tiffany Foster (with horse Victor)
    - Team winners: Ireland (Shane Sweetnam (with horse Chaqui Z), Kevin Babington (with horse Shorapur), Richie Moloney (with horse Carrabis Z), Cian O'Connor (with horse Seringat))
  - February 15–18: NCJ #2 in (United Arab Emirates) Al Ain
    - Individual winners: (France) Patrice Delaveau (with horse Aquila Hdc), (France) Philippe Rozier (with horse Rahotep de Toscane), (Qatar) Sheikh Ali Al-Thani (with horse First Division)
    - Team winners: France (Philippe Rozier (with horse Rahotep de Toscane), Frédéric David (with horse Equador Van'T Roosakker), Adeline Hecart (with horse Pasha du Gue), Patrice Delaveau (with horse Aquila Hdc))
  - April 26–30: NCJ #3 in (Belgium) Lummen
    - Individual winners: (Belgium) Olivier Philippaerts (with horse H&M Cabrio van de Heffinck), (Germany) Mario Stevens (with horse Baloubet 4), (Spain) Gerardo Meléndez Mieres (with horse Cassino DC)
    - Team winners: Germany (Maurice Tebbel (with horse Chacco's Son), Holger Wulschner (with horse BSC Skipper), Mario Stevens (with horse Baloubet 4), André Thieme (with horse Conthendrix))
  - May 4–7: NCJ #4 in (Austria) Linz-Ebelsberg
    - Individual winners: (Belgium) Jérôme Guery (with horse Grand Cru van de Rozenberg), (Czech Republic) Zuzana Zelinkova (with horse Caleri II), (United Kingdom) Robert Whitaker (with horse Catwalk IV)
    - Team winners: Italy (Emanuele Gaudiano (with horse Chalou), Davide Sbardella (with horse Triomphe van Schuttershof), Luca Maria Moneta (with horse Herold N), Luca Marziani (with horse Tokyo du Soleil))
  - May 4–7: NCJ #5 in Coapexpan (Veracruz)
    - Individual winner: (Canada) Keean White (with horse For Freedom Z)
    - Team winners: Mexico (Antonio Maurer (with horse Galileo de Laubry), Patricio Pasquel (with horse Babel), Federico Fernández (with horse Landpeter do Feroleto), Antonio Chedraui Eguia (with horse Ninloubet))
  - May 11–14: NCJ #6 in La Baule-Escoublac
    - Individual winners: (France) Pénélope Leprevost (with horse Flora de Mariposa), (Republic of Ireland) Shane Breen (with horse Golden Hawk), (Switzerland) Paul Estermann (with horse Lord Pepsi)
    - Team winners: France (Cedric Angot (with horse Saxo de La Cour), Kevin Staut (with horse Reveur de Hurtebise HDC), Roger-Yves Bost (with horse Sangria du Coty), Pénélope Leprevost (with horse Flora de Mariposa))
  - May 11–14: NCJ #7 in (Norway) Drammen
    - Individual winner: (France) Alexis Deroubaix (with horse Timon D'Aure)
    - Team winners: Ireland (Alexander Butler (with horse Hallowberry Cruz), Mark Mcauley (with horse Utchan de Belheme), Cameron Hanley (with horse Quirex), Captain Geoff Curran (with horse Ringwood Glen))
  - May 24–28: NCJ #8 in Rome
    - Individual winners: (Italy) Alberto Zorzi (with horse Fair Light van T Heike), (Sweden) Douglas Lindelöw (with horse Zacramento), (Switzerland) Steve Guerdat (with horse Bianca)
    - Team winners: Italy (Piergiorgio Bucci (with horse Casallo Z), Alberto Zorzi (with horse Fair Light van T Heike), Lorenzo de Luca (with horse Ensor de Litrange LXII), Bruno Chimirri (with horse Tower Mouche))
  - May 25–28: NCJ #9 in (Portugal) Lisbon
    - Individual winners: (Belgium) Constant van Paesschen (with horse Carlow van de Helle), (Spain) Diego Pérez Bilbao (with horse HH Best Buy), (Belgium) Fabienne Daigneux Lange (with horse Venue d'Fees des Hazalles)
    - Team winners: Belgium (Constant van Paesschen (with horse Carlow van de Helle), Fabienne Daigneux Lange (with horse Venue d'Fees des Hazalles), Jos Verlooy (with horse Caracas), Nicola Philippaerts (with horse Chilli Willi))
  - May 31 – June 4: NCJ #10 in (Canada) Langley, British Columbia
    - Individual winner: (Republic of Ireland) Daniel Coyle (with horse Cita)
    - Team winners: United States (Adrienne Sternlicht (with horse Cristalline), Margie Goldstein-Engle (with horse Royce), Catherine Nicole Tyree (with horse Bokai), Heather Caristo-Williams (with horse Qui Vive des Songes Z))
  - June 1–4: NCJ #11 in (Switzerland) St. Gallen
    - Individual winners: (Switzerland) Steve Guerdat (with horse Bianca), (Sweden) Angelie von Essen (with horse Newton Abbot), (France) Roger-Yves Bost (with horse Sangria du Coty)
    - Team winners: Italy (Luca Marziani (with horse Tokyo du Soleil), Paolo Paini (with horse Ottava Meraviglia di Ca' San G), Emilio Bicocchi (with horse Sassicaia Ares), Lorenzo de Luca (with horse Armitages Boy))
  - June 1–5: NCJ #12 in Uggerhalne
    - Individual winners: (Denmark) Soren Moeller Rohde (with horse Velerne ASK), (Sweden) Alexander Zetterman (with horse Cordalis 8), (United Kingdom) William Funnell (with horse Billy Buckingham)
    - Team winners: Denmark (Lars Bak Andersen (with horse Carrasco), Soren Moeller Rohde (with horse Velerne ASK), Thomas Sandgaard (with horse Amarone), Thomas Velin (with horse Chopin van het Moleneind))
  - June 8–11: NCJ #13 in (Poland) Sopot
    - Individual winner: (United States) Laura Kraut (with horse Deauville S)
    - Team winners: United States (Lauren Hough (with horse Waterford), Paris Sellon (with horse Cassandra), Chloe Reid (with horse Codarco), Laura Kraut (with horse Deauville S))
  - June 22–25: NCJ #14 in (Netherlands) Rotterdam
    - Individual winners: (Sweden) Henrik von Eckermann (with horse Cantinero), (Switzerland) Steve Guerdat (with horse Bianca), (Italy) Lorenzo de Luca (with horse Armitages Boy), (Spain) Eduardo Álvarez Aznar (with horse Rokfeller de Pleville Bois Margot), (Netherlands) Harrie Smolders (with horse Don VHP Z), (Germany) Marcus Ehning (with horse Pret A Tout), (Republic of Ireland) Bertram Allen (with horse Hector van d'Abdijhoeve)
    - Team winners: Sweden (Henrik von Eckermann (with horse Cantinero), Rolf-Göran Bengtsson (with horse Clarimo Ask), Douglas Lindelöw (with horse Zacramento), Peder Fredricson (with horse H&M All In))
  - June 29 – July 2: NCJ #15 in (Luxembourg) Roeser
    - Individual winners: (Spain) Diego Pérez Bilbao (with horse HH Best Buy), (Switzerland) Philipp Züger (with horse Casanova F Z), (Belgium) Catherine van Roosbroeck (with horse Gautcho da Quinta), (United Arab Emirates) Abdullah Mohd al-Marri (with horse Sama Dubai FBH)
    - Team winners: Belgium (Catherine van Roosbroeck (with horse Gautcho da Quinta), Dominique Hendrickx (with horse Bacardi Les Hauts), Nicola Philippaerts (with horse H&M Harley VD Bisschop), Wilm Vermeir (with horse IQ van Het Steentje))
  - July 13–16: NCJ #16 in (Sweden) Falsterbo
    - Individual winners: (Germany) Meredith Michaels-Beerbaum (with horse Daisy), (Republic of Ireland) Shane Sweetnam (with horse Chaqui Z), (United States) Chloe Reid (with horse Codarco), (Sweden) Henrik von Eckermann (with horse Mary Lou 194)
    - Team winners: Netherlands (Ruben Romp (with horse Audi'S Teavanta II C Z), Aniek Poels (with horse Athene), Michel Hendrix (with horse Baileys), Jur Vrieling (with horse Vdl Glasgow V. Merelsnest))
  - July 27–30: NCJ #17 in (United Kingdom) Hickstead
    - Individual winners: (France) Kevin Staut (with horse For Joy Van't Zorgvliet HDC), (Netherlands) Harrie Smolders (with horse Don VHP Z), (Brazil) Pedro Veniss (with horse For Felicila), (Brazil) Marlon Modolo Zanotelli (with horse Sirene de La Motte)
    - Team winners: Brazil (Marlon Modolo Zanotelli (with horse Sirene de La Motte), Pedro Veniss (with horse For Felicila), Yuri Mansur (with horse Babylotte), Pedro Junqueira Muylaert (with horse Prince Royal Z Mfs))
  - August 9–13: NCJ #18 in (Republic of Ireland) Dublin
    - Individual winners: (Netherlands) Michael Greeve (with horse Whitney BB), (United States) Lauren Hough (with horse Ohlala), (United States) Laura Kraut (with horse Confu), (France) Olivier Robert (with horse Eros)
    - Team winners: United States (Lauren Hough (with horse Ohlala), Lillie Keenan (with horse Super Sox), Beezie Madden (with horse Darry Lou), Laura Kraut (with horse Confu))
  - August 30 – September 4: NCJ #19 in (Spain) Gijón
    - Individual winners: (France) Nicolas Delmotte (with horse Ilex VP), (United Kingdom) Ben Maher (with horse MTF Madame X), (Netherlands) Roelof Bril (with horse Arlando), (Republic of Ireland) Shane Breen (with horse Ipswich van de Wolfsakker)
    - Team winners: France (Kevin Staut (with horse For Joy van't Zorgvliet HDC), Edward Levy (with horse Sirius Black), Grégory Cottard (with horse Regate d'Aure), Nicolas Delmotte (with horse Ilex VP))
  - September 28 – October 1: NCJ #20 (final) in (Spain) Barcelona
    - There were ten show jumpers that have no faults.
    - Team winners: Netherlands (Jur Vrieling (with horse Vdl Glasgow V. Merelsnest), Michel Hendrix (with horse Baileys), Marc Houtzager (with horse Sterrehof's Calimero), Harrie Smolders (with horse Don Vhp Z))

== 2017 FEI Nations Cup Dressage ==
- March 21 – July 30: 2017 FEI Nations Cup Dressage Season
  - March 21–26: NCD #1 in (United States) Wellington, Florida
    - Individual winner: (Canada) Tina Irwin with horse Laurencio
    - Team winners: Canada (Tina Irwin with horse Laurencio, Jaimey Irwin with horse Donegal V, Megan Lane with horse Caravella, & Jill Irving with horse Degas 12)
  - May 5–7: NCD #2 in (Ukraine) Kyiv
    - Event cancelled.
  - May 18–21: NCD #3 in (France) Compiègne
    - Individual winner: (United Kingdom) Spencer Wilton with horse Super Nova II
    - Team winners: Great Britain (Spencer Wilton with horse Super Nova II, Hayley Watson-Greaves with horse Rubins Nite, Gareth Hughes with horse Don Carissimo, Daniel Watson with horse Amadeus)
  - June 1–5: NCD #4 in Uggerhalne
    - Individual winner: (Denmark) Anna Kasprzak with horse Donnperignon
    - Team winners: Denmark (Anna Kasprzak with horse Donnperignon, Daniel Bachmann Andersen with horse Blue Hors Zack, Agnete Kirk Thinggaard with horse Jojo AZ, Charlotte Heering with horse Bufranco)
  - June 22–25: NCD #5 in (Netherlands) Rotterdam
    - Individual winner: (United States) Laura Graves with horse Verdades
    - Team winners: United States (Laura Graves with horse Verdades, Kasey Perry-Glass with horse Goerklintgaards Dublet, Olivia Lagoy-Weltz with horse Lonoir, Dawn White-O'Connor with horse Legolas 92)
  - July 13–16: NCD #6 in Falsterbo
    - Individual winner: (Sweden) Patrik Kittel with horse Deja
    - Team winners: Sweden (Patrik Kittel with horse Deja, Tinne Vilhelmson-Silfvén with horse Paridon Magi, Rose Mathisen with horse Zuidenwind 1187)
  - July 19–23: NCD #7 in Aachen
    - Individual winner: (Germany) Isabell Werth with horse Weihegold Old
    - Team winners: Germany (Isabell Werth with horse Weihegold Old, Sönke Rothenberger with horse Cosmo 59, Dorothee Schneider with horse Sammy Davis Jr., Hubertus Schmidt with horse Imperio 3)
  - July 27–30: NCD #8 (final) in (United Kingdom) Hickstead
    - Individual winner: (France) Pierre Volla with horse Badinda Altena
    - Team winners: France (Nicole Faverau with horse Ginsengue, Ludovic Henry with horse After You, Arnaud Serre with horse Ultrablue de Massa, Pierre Volla with horse Badinda Altena)

== 2017 FEI Nations Cup Eventing ==
- April 22 – October 8: 2017 FEI Nations Cup Eventing Season
  - April 22 & 23: NCE #1 in (Italy) Montelibretti
    - Event cancelled.
  - May 17–21: NCE #2 in (Poland) Strzegom
    - Individual winner: (Germany) Kai Rüder (with horse Colani Sunrise)
    - Team winners: Germany (Andreas Dibowski (with horse FRH Butts Avedon), Falk-Filip-Finn Westerich (with horse FBW Gina K), Beeke Jankowski (with horse Tiberius 20), Jörg Kurbel (with horse Entertain You))
  - May 25–28: NCE #3 in (United Kingdom) Houghton Hall
    - Individual winner: (Germany) Bettina Hoy (with horse Seigneur Medicott)
    - Team winners: Germany (Bettina Hoy (with horse Seigneur Medicott), Julia Krajewski (with horse Samourai du Thot), Andreas Ostholt (with horse So Is ET, Christoph Wahler (with horse Green Mount Flight))
  - May 31 – June 4: NCE #4 in (Republic of Ireland) Ratoath (Tattersalls)
    - Individual winner: (France) Luc Château (with horse Propriano de L'Ebat)
    - Team winners: France (Luc Château (with horse Propriano de L'Ebat), Sidney Dufresne (with horse Tresor Mail), Raphael Cochet (with horse Sherazad de Louviere), Pierre Touzaint (with horse Scapin du Brio))
  - June 30 – July 2: NCE #5 in (Austria) Wiener Neustadt
    - Individual winner: (United Kingdom) Georgie Spence (with horse Halltown Harley)
    - Team winners: Germany (Felix Etzel (with horse Bandit 436), Jörg Kurbel (with horse Brookfield de Bouncer), Nicolai Aldinger (with horse Newell), Vanessa Bölting (with horse Carlson B))
  - July 8 & 9: NCE #6 in The Plains, Virginia
    - Individual winner: (United States) Jennie Brannigan (with horse Cambalda)
    - Team winners: United States (Jennie Brannigan (with horse Cambalda), Lynn Symansky (with horse Donner), Phillip Dutton (with horse I'm Sew Ready), Boyd Martin (with horse Steady Eddie))
  - July 19–23: NCE #7 in Aachen
    - Individual winner: (Germany) Ingrid Klimke (with horse Horseware Hale Bob Old)
    - Team winners: Germany (Ingrid Klimke (with horse Horseware Hale Bob Old), Michael Jung (with horse La Biosthetique – Sam FBW), Sandra Auffarth (with horse Opgun Louvo), Josefa Sommer (with horse Hamilton 24))
  - August 10–13: NCE #8 in Le Pin-au-Haras
    - Individual winner: (Australia) Chris Burton (with horse Quality Purdey)
    - Team winners: France (Karim Florent Laghouag (with horse Entebbe de Hus), Lionel Guyon (with horse Tactic de Lalou), Nicolas Touzaint (with horse Topsecret d'Eglefin), Thibault Fournier (with horse Siniant de Lathus))
  - September 22–24: NCE #9 in (Belgium) Waregem
    - Individual winner: (France) Maxime Livio (with horse Pica d'Or)
    - Team winners: Germany (Julia Mestern (with horse Grand Prix Iwest), Anna-Maria Rieke (with horse Petite Dame), Leonie Kuhlmann (with horse Cascora), Sandra Auffarth (with horse Viamant du Matz))
  - October 5–8: NCE #10 (final) in (Netherlands) Boekelo
    - Individual winner: (New Zealand) Tim Price (with horse Cekatinka)
    - Team winners: New Zealand (Tim Price (with horse Cekatinka), Mark Todd (with horse McClaren), Daniel Jocelyn (with horse Grovine de Reve), Blyth Tait (with horse Havanna van 'T Castaneahof))

== 2017 Longines Global Champions Tour ==
- April 6 – November 11: 2017 Longines Global Champions Tour Season
  - April 6–9: 2017 LGCT #1 in Mexico City Winner: (Switzerland) Martin Fuchs with horse Chaplin
  - April 13–15: 2017 LGCT #2 in (United States) Miami Beach Winner: (Belgium) Jérôme Guery with horse Grand Cru van de Rozenberg
  - April 28–30: 2017 LGCT #3 in (China) Shanghai Winner: (Italy) Lorenzo de Luca with horse Ensor de Litrange LXII
  - May 19–21: 2017 LGCT #4 in (Spain) Madrid Winner: (United States) Kent Farrington with horse Gazelle
  - May 24–28: 2017 LGCT #5 in (Germany) Hamburg Winner: (Sweden) Rolf-Göran Bengtsson with horse Casall ASK
  - June 8–10: 2017 LGCT #6 in (France) Cannes Winner: (Spain) Sergio Álvarez Moya with horse Arrayan
  - June 23–25: 2017 LGCT #7 in Monaco Winner: (Italy) Alberto Zorzi with horse Cornetto K
  - June 30 – July 2: 2017 LGCT #8 in (France) Paris Winner: (France) Julien Epaillard with horse Usual Suspect d'Auge
  - July 7 & 8: 2017 LGCT #9 in (Portugal) Cascais-Estoril Winner: (Israel) Danielle Goldstein with horse Lizziemary
  - July 13–16: 2017 LGCT #10 in (France) Chantilly, Oise Winner: (Netherlands) Harrie Smolders with horse Emerald N.O.P.
  - July 28–30: 2017 LGCT #11 in (Germany) Berlin Winner: (Germany) Christian Ahlmann with horse Codex One
  - August 4–6: 2017 LGCT #12 in (United Kingdom) London Winner: (United Kingdom) Scott Brash with horse Hello Forever
  - August 11–13: 2017 LGCT #13 in (Netherlands) Valkenswaard Winner: (Italy) Lorenzo de Luca with horse Ensor de Litrange LXII
  - September 21–24: 2017 LGCT #14 in (Italy) Rome Winner: (Sweden) Evelina Tovek with horse Castello 194
  - November 9–11: 2017 LGCT #15 (final) in (Qatar) Doha Winner: (Qatar) Bassem Hassan Mohammed with horse Gunder

== 2017 Spruce Meadows Jumping Tournaments ==
- June 7–11: The National
  - Main event: The RBC Grand Prix presented by Rolex
  - Winner: (Mexico) Patricio Pasquel (with horse Babel)
- June 14–18: The Continental
  - Main event: The CP Grand Prix
  - Winner: (Egypt) Sameh el-Dahan (with horse Sumas Zorro)
- June 27 – July 2: The Pan American
  - Main event: The Pan American Cup presented by ROLEX
  - Winner: (Brazil) Pedro Veniss (with horse Quabri de Lisle)
- July 5–9: The North American
  - Main event: The ATCO Queen Elizabeth II Cup
  - Winner: (United States) Kent Farrington (with horse Gazelle)
- September 6–10: The Masters
  - Main event #1 -> The BMO Nations Cup
  - Winners: United States (Lauren Hough (with horse Waterford), Charlie Jacobs (with horse Cassinja S), Lillie Keenan (with horse Fibonacci 17), & Beezie Madden (with horse Darry Lou))
  - Main event #2 -> The CP 'International' presented by Rolex
  - Winner: (Germany) Philipp Weishaupt (with horse LB Convall)

== Horse racing ==
=== Triple Crowns ===
US Triple Crown

- May 6: Kentucky Derby at Churchill Downs
  - Horse: (United States) Always Dreaming; Jockey: (Puerto Rico) John R. Velazquez; Trainer: (United States) Todd Pletcher
- May 20: Preakness Stakes at (Maryland) Pimlico Race Course
  - Horse: (United States) Cloud Computing; Jockey: (Venezuela) Javier Castellano; Trainer: (United States) Chad Brown
- June 10: Belmont Stakes at (New York (state)) Belmont Park
  - Horse: (United States) Tapwrit; Jockey: (Puerto Rico) Jose Ortiz; Trainer: (United States) Todd Pletcher

Canadian Triple Crown

- July 2: Queen's Plate at (Ontario) Woodbine Racetrack
  - Horse: (Canada) Holy Helena; Jockey: (Mexico) Luis Contreras; Trainer: (United States) James A. Jerkens
- July 25: Prince of Wales Stakes at (Ontario) Fort Erie Race Track
  - Horse: (United States) Cool Catomine; Jockey: (Mexico) Luis Contreras; Trainer: (Canada) John A. Ross
- August 20: Breeders' Stakes at (Ontario) Woodbine Racetrack
  - Horse: (Canada) Channel Maker; Jockey: (Puerto Rico) Rafael Hernandez; Trainer: (United States) William I. Mott

UK Triple Crown

- May 6: 2,000 Guineas at (England) Newmarket Racecourse
  - Horse: (Republic of Ireland) Churchill; Jockey: (England) Ryan Moore; Trainer: (Republic of Ireland) Aidan O'Brien
- June 3: Epsom Derby at (England) Epsom Downs Racecourse
  - Horse: (France) Wings of Eagles; Jockey: (Republic of Ireland) Padraig Beggy; Trainer: (Republic of Ireland) Aidan O'Brien
- September 16: St Leger at (England) Doncaster Racecourse
  - Horse: (Republic of Ireland) Capri; Jockey: (England) Ryan Moore; Trainer: (Republic of Ireland) Aidan O'Brien

Irish Triple Crown

- May 27: Irish 2,000 Guineas at the (Republic of Ireland) Curragh Racecourse
  - Horse: (Republic of Ireland) Churchill; Jockey: (England) Ryan Moore; Trainer: (Republic of Ireland) Aidan O'Brien
- July 1: Irish Derby at the (Republic of Ireland) Curragh Racecourse
  - Horse: (Republic of Ireland) Capri; Jockey: (Republic of Ireland) Seamie Heffernan; Trainer: (Republic of Ireland) Aidan O'Brien
- September 10: Irish St. Leger at the (Republic of Ireland) Curragh Racecourse
  - Horse: (Republic of Ireland) Order of St George; Jockey: (England) Ryan Moore; Trainer: (Republic of Ireland) Aidan O'Brien

French Triple Crown

- May 14: Poule d'Essai des Poulains (French 2,000 Guineas) at (France) Longchamp Racecourse
  - Horse: (Republic of Ireland) Brametot; Jockey: (Italy) Cristian Demuro; Trainer: (France) Jean-Claude Rouget
- June 4: Prix du Jockey Club (French Derby) at (France) Chantilly Racecourse
  - Horse: (Republic of Ireland) Brametot; Jockey: (Italy) Cristian Demuro; Trainer: (France) Jean-Claude Rouget
- July 14: Grand Prix de Paris at (France) Longchamp Racecourse
  - Horse: (France) Shakeel; Jockey: (Belgium) Christophe Soumillon; Trainer: (France) Alain de Royer-Dupré

Australian Triple Crown

- March 4: Randwick Guineas at (Australia) Randwick Racecourse
  - Horse: (Australia) Inference; Jockey: (Australia) Tommy Berry; Trainers: (Australia) Michael Hawkes, Wayne Hawkes and John Hawkes
- March 18: Rosehill Guineas at (Australia) Rosehill Gardens Racecourse
  - Horse: (New Zealand) Gingernuts; Jockey: (New Zealand) Opie Bosson; Trainers: (New Zealand) Stephen Autridge & Jamie Richards
- April 1: Australian Derby at (Australia) Randwick Racecourse
  - Horse: (New Zealand) Jon Snow; Jockey: (Australia) Damian Lane; Trainers: (New Zealand) Murray Baker & Andrew Forsman

Hong Kong Triple Crown

- January 30: Hong Kong Stewards' Cup at Sha Tin Racecourse
  - Horse: (Hong Kong) Helene Paragon; Jockey: (Australia) Tommy Berry; Trainer: (Australia) John Moore
- February 26: Hong Kong Gold Cup at Sha Tin Racecourse
  - Horse: (New Zealand) Werther; Jockey: (Australia) Hugh Bowman; Trainer: (Australia) John Moore
- May 28: Hong Kong Champions & Chater Cup at Sha Tin Racecourse
  - Horse: (New Zealand) Werther; Jockey: (Australia) Hugh Bowman; Trainer: (Australia) John Moore

Japanese Triple Crown

- April 16: Satsuki Shō (Japanese 2,000 Guineas) at (Japan) Nakayama Racecourse
  - Horse: (Japan) Al Ain; Jockey: (Japan) Kohei Matsuyama; Trainer: (Japan) Yasutoshi Ikee
- May 28: Tokyo Yūshun (Japanese Derby) at (Japan) Tokyo Racecourse
  - Horse: (Japan) Rey de Oro; Jockey: (France) Christophe Lemaire; Trainer: (Japan) Kazuo Fujisawa
- October 22: Kikuka-shō (Japanese St Leger) at (Japan) Kyoto Racecourse
  - Horse: (Japan) Kiseki; Jockey: (Japan) Mirco Demuro; Trainer: (Japan) Katsuhiko Sumii

=== Other notable races ===
- January 28: Pegasus World Cup at (United States) Gulfstream Park
  - Horse: (United States) Arrogate; Jockey: (United States) Mike E. Smith; Trainer: (United States) Bob Baffert
- March 5: Gran Premio Latinoamericano at (Chile) Valparaiso Sporting
  - Horse: (Argentina) Sixties Song; Jockey: (Argentina) Juan C. Villagra; Trainer: (Argentina) Alfredo Gaitán Dassié
- March 14–17: Cheltenham Festival at (England) Cheltenham Racecourse
  - March 14: Champion Hurdle
    - Horse: (France) Buveur d'Air; Jockey: (Republic of Ireland) Noel Fehily; Trainer: (England) Nicky Henderson
  - March 15: Queen Mother Champion Chase
    - Horse: (United Kingdom) Special Tiara; Jockey: (Republic of Ireland) Noel Fehily; Trainer: (Republic of Ireland) Henry de Bromhead
  - March 16: Stayers' Hurdle
    - Horse: (United Kingdom) Nichols Canyon; Jockey: (Republic of Ireland) Ruby Walsh; Trainer: (Republic of Ireland) Willie Mullins
  - March 17: Cheltenham Gold Cup
    - Horse: (United Kingdom) Sizing John; Jockey: (Republic of Ireland) Robbie Power; Trainer: (Republic of Ireland) Jessica Harrington
- March 25: Dubai World Cup Night at (United Arab Emirates) Meydan Racecourse
  - Dubai World Cup
    - Horse: (United States) Arrogate; Jockey: (United States) Mike E. Smith; Trainer: (United States) Bob Baffert
  - Dubai Sheema Classic
    - Horse: (United Kingdom) Jack Hobbs; Jockey: (United Kingdom) / (Denmark) William Buick; Trainer: (England) John Gosden
  - Dubai Turf
    - Horse: (Japan) Vivlos; Jockey: (Brazil) João Moreira; Trainer: (Japan) Yasuo Tomomichi
- April 8: Grand National at (England) Aintree Racecourse
  - Horse: (Republic of Ireland) One For Arthur; Jockey: (Republic of Ireland) Derek Fox; Trainer: (Scotland) Lucinda Russell
- April 8: Queen Elizabeth Stakes at (Australia) Randwick Racecourse
  - Horse: (Australia) Winx; Jockey: (Australia) Hugh Bowman; Trainer: (New Zealand) Chris Waller
- April 30: Queen Elizabeth II Cup at (Hong Kong) Sha Tin Racecourse
- June 20–24: Royal Ascot at (England) Ascot Racecourse
  - June 20: St. James's Palace Stakes
  - June 21: Prince of Wales's Stakes
  - June 22: Gold Cup
  - June 23: Coronation Stakes
  - June 24: Diamond Jubilee Stakes
- June 25: Takarazuka Kinen at (Japan) Hanshin Racecourse
- July 2: Grand Prix de Saint-Cloud at (France) Saint-Cloud Racecourse
- July 29: King George VI and Queen Elizabeth Stakes at (England) Ascot Racecourse
- August 12: Arlington Million at (United States) Arlington Park
- August 19: Pacific Classic at (United States) Del Mar Racetrack
- August 23: International Stakes at (England) York Racecourse
- August 26: Travers Stakes at (United States) Saratoga Race Course
- September 9: Irish Champion Stakes at (Republic of Ireland) Leopardstown Racecourse
- October 1: Prix de l'Arc de Triomphe at (France) Longchamp Racecourse
- October: Jockey Club Gold Cup at (United States) Belmont Park
- October: Canadian International Stakes at (Canada) Woodbine Racetrack
- October 14: The Everest at (Australia) Randwick Racecourse
- October 21: British Champions Day at (England) Ascot Racecourse
  - Champion Stakes
  - Queen Elizabeth II Stakes
- October 28: Cox Plate at (Australia) Moonee Valley Racecourse
- November 3–4: Breeders' Cup at (United States) Del Mar Racetrack
  - November 3: Breeders' Cup Distaff
  - November 4: Breeders' Cup Classic
  - November 4: Breeders' Cup Turf
  - November 4: Breeders' Cup Mile
- November 7: Melbourne Cup at (Australia) Flemington Racecourse
- November 26: Japan Cup at Tokyo Racecourse
- December 10: Hong Kong International Races at Sha Tin Racecourse
  - Hong Kong Cup
- December 24: Arima Kinen at (Japan) Nakayama Racecourse
