= Show Jumping World Cup =

International horse competition

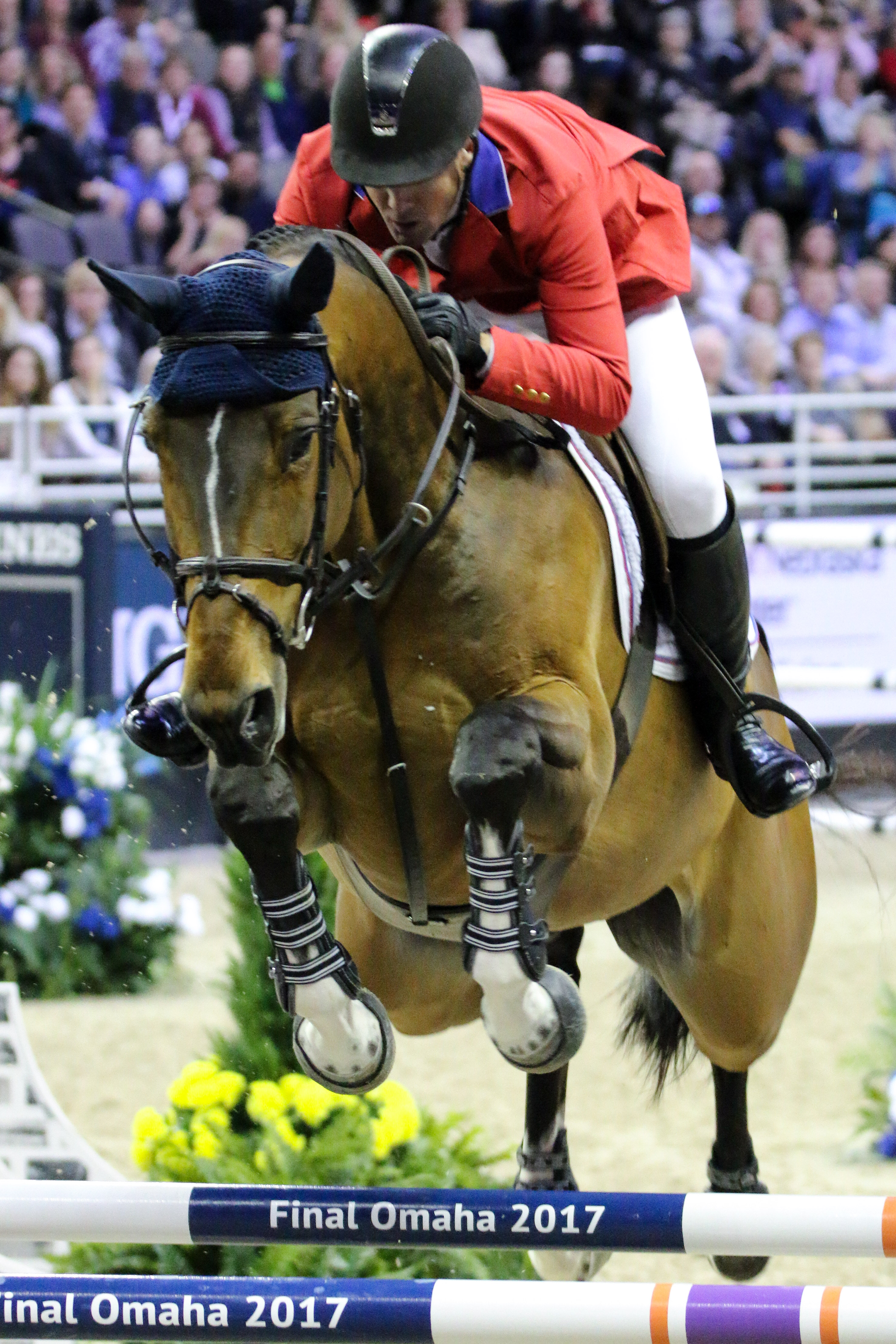
HH Azur and McLain Ward at the 2017 FEI World Cup Jumping Finals

The FEI Show Jumping World Cup is an annual international competition among the world's best show jumping horses and riders. The series, created in 1978, today comprises 14 leagues on all continents. The best riders from 132 preliminary competitions qualify for the final. The FEI World Cup was thought up by a Swiss journalist and show jumping enthusiast, Max E. Ammann. For 20 years, until 1999, both the final and qualifiers were sponsored by Volvo. From 1999 to 2013, the series has been sponsored by Rolex. Longines has been the title sponsor of the series since October 2013.

Approximately 45 riders qualify from 13 leagues around the world. Usually there are 20 riders from Europe, 15 from the United States, 5 from Canada, and 5 from elsewhere in the world. At the beginning, the final was a rather complicated process and in 1981 its formula was modified. Since then it has not been changed. It starts with a Table C speed competition, followed by a jump-off competition and, after one day's rest, a two-round final not against the clock.

In the 28 World Cup finals held until 2007, US riders have emerged with the most titles, having won the championship seven times. Hugo Simon was the first rider to win the FEI World Cup three times, followed by Rodrigo Pessoa. Mario Deslauriers is so far the youngest winner, aged 19, in the competition's history riding Aramis in 1984.

The FEI World Cup Final is usually held in April of each year.

== 1979 ==
Gothenburg (SWE)

1. Hugo Simon (Austria) – Gladstone, 18, 0/24.50 secs
2. Katie Monahan (United States) – The Jones Boy, 18, 4/25.40
3. Eddie Macken (Republic of Ireland) – Carrolls of Dundalk, 6
4. Norman Dello Joio (United States) – Allegro, 6

== 1980 ==
Baltimore (USA)

1. Conrad Homfeld (United States) – Balbuco, 47.50
2. Melanie Smith (United States) – Calypso, 44.50
3. Paul Schockemöhle (Germany) – El Paso, 42

== 1981 ==
Birmingham, England (GBR)

1. Michael Matz (United States) – Jet Run, 39
2. Donald Cheska (United States) – Southside, 37
3. Hugo Simon (Austria) – Gladstone, 35.50

== 1982 ==
Gothenburg (SWE)

1. Melanie Smith (United States) – Calypso, 0 penalties
2. Paul Schockemöhle (Germany) – Akrobat, 1
3. Hugo Simon (Austria) – Gladstone, 10
4. John Whitaker (United Kingdom) – Ryan's Son, 10

== 1983 ==
Vienna (AUT)

1. Norman Dello Joio (United States) – I Love You, 0 penalties
2. Hugo Simon (Austria) – Gladstone, 4
3. Melanie Smith (United States) – Calypso, 7.50

== 1984 ==
Gothenburg (SWE)

1. Mario Deslauriers (Canada) – Aramis, 4 penalties
2. Norman Dello Joio (United States) – I Love You, 5
3. Nelson Pessoa (Brazil) – Moët & Chandon Larramy, 5

== 1985 ==
Berlin (FRG)

1. Conrad Homfeld (United States) – Abdullah, 3 penalties
2. Nick Skelton (United Kingdom) – Everest St James, 4
3. Pierre Durand (France) – Jappeloup, 8.50

== 1986 ==
Gothenburg (SWE)

1. Leslie Burr Leneghan (United States) – McLain, 0 penalties
2. Ian Millar (Canada) – Big Ben, 13
3. Conrad Homfeld (United States) – Maybe, 16.50

== 1987 ==
Paris (FRA)

1. Katharine Burdsall (United States) – The Natural, 4.50 penalties
2. Philippe Rozier (France) – Malesan Jiva, 7.50
3. Lisa Jacquin (United States) – For The Moment, 8

== 1988 ==
Gothenburg (SWE)

1. Ian Millar (Canada) – Big Ben, 4 penalties
2. Pierre Durand (France) – Jappeloup de Luze, 8.5
3. Philippe Le Jeune (Belgium) – Nistria, 12.5

== 1989 ==
Tampa (USA)

1. Ian Millar (Canada) – Big Ben, 0 penalties
2. John Whitaker (United Kingdom) – Next Milton, 10.75
3. George Lindeman (United States) – Jupiter, 14.5

== 1990 ==
Dortmund (GER)

1. John Whitaker (United Kingdom) – Henderson Milton, 4 penalties
2. Pierre Durand (France) – Jappeloup, 12.50
3. Franke Sloothaak (Germany) – Walzerkönig, 14

== 1991 ==
Gothenburg (SWE)

1. John Whitaker (United Kingdom) – Henderson Milton, 1.50 penalties
2. Nelson Pessoa (Brazil) – Special Envoy, 5
3. Roger-Yves Bost (France) – Norton de Rhuys, 5.50

== 1992 ==
Del Mar (USA) (Final was held outdoors)

1. Thomas Frühmann (Austria) - Bockmann's Genius, 0
2. Lesley McNaught-Mändli (Switzerland) - Moet & Chandon Pirol, 10.5
3. Markus Fuchs (Switzerland) - Interpane Shandor, 11

== 1993 ==
Gothenburg (SWE)

1. Ludger Beerbaum (Germany) - Almox Ratina Z, 8
2. John Whitaker (United Kingdom) - Milton, 10.5
3. Michael Matz (United States) - Rhum, 12.5

== 1994 ==
World Cup Finals at 's-Hertogenbosch (NLD)
	Rider	Nation	Horse/Horses	Penalties (Total)
1	Jos Lansink	(Netherlands)	Bollvorms Libero H	0
2	Franke Sloothaak	(Germany)	Dorina & Weihaiwej	9.5
3	Michael Whitaker	(United Kingdom)	Midnight Madness	14

== 1995 ==
World Cup Finals at Gothenburg (SWE)
	Rider	Nation	Horse/Horses	Penalties (Total)
1	Nick Skelton	(United Kingdom)	Everest Dollar Girl	7
2	Lars Nieberg	(Germany)	For Pleasure	9
3	Lesley McNaught-Mändli	(Switzerland)	Barcelona SVH & Doenhoff	13

== 1996 ==
World Cup Finals at Geneve (SUI)
	Rider	Nation	Horse/Horses	Penalties (Total)
1	Hugo Simon	(Austria)	E.T.	10, 0 + 49.03
2	Willi Melliger	(Switzerland)	Calvaro V	10, 0 +51.10
3	Nick Skelton	(United Kingdom)	Dollar Girl	11

== 1997 ==
World Cup Finals at Gothenburg (SWE)
	Rider	Nation	Horse/Horses	Penalties (Total)
1	Hugo Simon	(Austria)	E.T. FRH	0
2	John Whitaker	(United Kingdom)	Grannush & Welham	3.50
3	Franke Sloothaak	(Germany)	San Patrignano Joly	6

== 1998 ==
World Cup Finals at Helsinki (FIN)
	Rider	Nation	Horse/Horses	Penalties (Total)
1	Rodrigo Pessoa	(Brazil)	Loro Piana Baloubet du Rouet	6.5
2	Lars Nieberg	(Germany)	Esprit	7.5
3	Ludger Beerbaum	(Germany)	P.S. Priamos	12.5

== 1999 ==
World Cup Finals at Gothenburg (SWE)
	Rider	Nation	Horse/Horses	Penalties (Total)
1	Rodrigo Pessoa	(Brazil)	Gandini Baloubet du Rouet	4
2	Trevor Coyle	(Republic of Ireland)	Cruising	5.5
3	René Tebbel	(Germany)	Radiator	8.25

== 2000 ==
World Cup Finals at Las Vegas (USA)
	Rider	Nation	Horse/Horses	Penalties (Total)
1	Rodrigo Pessoa	(Brazil)	Baloubet du Rouet	0
2	Markus Fuchs	(Switzerland)	Tinka's Boy	7.5
3	Beat Mändli	(Switzerland)	Pozitano	10

== 2001 ==
World Cup Finals at Gothenburg (SWE)
	Rider	Nation	Horse/Horses	Penalties (Total)
1	Markus Fuchs	(Switzerland)	Tinka's Boy	5, 0 +36.25
2	Rodrigo Pessoa	(Brazil)	Baloubet du Rouet	5, 8 +33.90
3	Michael Whitaker	(United Kingdom)	Handel II	8

== 2002 ==
World Cup Finals at Leipzig (GER)
	Rider	Nation	Horse/Horses	Penalties (Total)
1	Otto Becker	(Germany)	Dobels Cento	7
2	Ludger Beerbaum	(Germany)	Gladdys S	8
3	Rodrigo Pessoa	(Brazil)	Baloubet du Rouet	11

== 2003 ==
World Cup Finals at Las Vegas (USA)
	Rider	Nation	Horse/Horses	Penalties (Total)
1	Marcus Ehning	(Germany)	Anka	2
2	Rodrigo Pessoa	(Brazil)	Baloubet du Rouet	6
3	Malin Baryard	(Sweden)	H&M Butterfly Flip	8

== 2004 ==
World Cup Finals at Milan (ITA) 21 – 25 April
	Rider	Nation	Horse/Horses	Penalties (Total)
1	Bruno Broucqsault	(France)	Dileme de Cephe	0
2	Meredith Michaels-Beerbaum	(Germany)	Shutterfly	4
3	Markus Fuchs	(Switzerland)	Tinka's Boy	8

== 2005 ==
World Cup Finals at Las Vegas (USA) 21 – 24 April
	Rider	Nation	Horse/Horses	Penalties (Total)
1	Meredith Michaels-Beerbaum	(Germany)	Shutterfly	4
2	Michael Whitaker	(United Kingdom)	Portofino 63	7
3	Marcus Ehning	(Germany)	Gitania 8	9
3	Lars Nieberg	(Germany)	Lucie 55	9

== 2006 ==
World Cup Finals at Kuala Lumpur (MAS) 26 – 30 April
	Rider	Nation	Horse/Horses	Penalties (Total)
1	Marcus Ehning	(Germany)	Sandro Boy	0
2	Jessica Kürten	(Republic of Ireland)	Castle Forbes Libertina	1
3	Beat Mändli	(Switzerland)	Idéo du Thot	4

== 2007 ==
World Cup Finals at Las Vegas (USA) 19 – 22 April
	Rider	Nation	Horse/Horses	Penalties (Total)
1	Beat Mändli	(Switzerland)	Idéo du Thot	5
2	Daniel Deusser	(Germany)	Air Jordan Z	11
3	Steve Guerdat	(Switzerland)	Tresor	12
3	Markus Beerbaum	(Germany)	Leena	12

== 2008 ==
World Cup Finals at Gothenburg (SWE) 24 – 27 April
	Rider	Nation	Horse/Horses	Penalties (Total)
1	Meredith Michaels-Beerbaum	(Germany)	Shutterfly	4
2	Rich Fellers	(United States)	Flexible	6
3	Heinrich-Hermann Engemann	(Germany)	Aboyeur W	9

== 2009 ==
World Cup Finals at Las Vegas (USA) 15 – 19 April
	Rider	Nation	Horse/Horses	Penalties (Total)
1	Meredith Michaels-Beerbaum	(Germany)	Shutterfly	0
2	McLain Ward	(United States)	Sapphire	2
3	Albert Zoer	(Netherlands)	Okidoki	4

== 2010 ==
World Cup Finals at Le Grand-Saconnex (SUI) 14 – 18 April
	Rider	Nation	Horse/Horses	Penalties (Total)
1	Marcus Ehning	(Germany)	Noltes Küchengirl, Plot Blue	6
2	Ludger Beerbaum	(Germany)	Gotha	7
2	Pius Schwizer	(Switzerland)	Ulysse, Carlina	7

== 2011 ==
World Cup Finals at Leipzig (GER) 27 April – 1 May
	Rider	Nation	Horse/Horses	Penalties (Total)
1	Christian Ahlmann	(Germany)	Taloubet Z	4
2	Eric Lamaze	(Canada)	Hickstead	10
3	Jeroen Dubbeldam	(Netherlands)	Simon	11

== 2012 ==
World Cup Finals at Hertogenbosch (NLD) 19 April – 22 April
	Rider	Nation	Horse/Horses	Penalties (Total)
1	Rich Fellers	(United States)	Flexible	1, 0 +25.97 secs
2	Steve Guerdat	(Switzerland)	Nino des Buissonnets	1, 0 +26.61 secs
3	Pius Schwizer	(Switzerland)	Ulysse, Carlina	5

== 2013 ==
World Cup Finals at Gothenburg (SWE) 24 April – 28 April
	Rider	Nation	Horse/Horses	Penalties (Total)
1	Beezie Madden	(United States)	Simon	9, 0 +41.66 secs
2	Steve Guerdat	(Switzerland)	Nino des Buissonnets	9, 8 +30.33 secs
3	Kevin Staut	(France)	Silvana HDC	10

== 2014 ==
World Cup Finals at Lyon (FRA) 17 April – 24 April
	Rider	Nation	Horse/Horses	Penalties (Total)
1	Daniel Deusser	(Germany)	Cornet d'Amour	2
2	Ludger Beerbaum	(Germany)	Chaman & Chiara 222	4
3	Scott Brash	(United Kingdom)	Ursula XII	5

== 2015 ==
World Cup Finals at Las Vegas (USA) 16 April – 19 April
	Rider	Nation	Horse/Horses	Penalties (Total)	Time
1	Steve Guerdat	(Switzerland)	Albfuehren's Paille	8	
2	Pénélope Leprevost	(France)	Vagabond de la Pomme	9	65.30
3	Bertram Allen	(Republic of Ireland)	Molly Malone V	9	65.87

== 2016 ==
World Cup Finals at Gothenburg (SWE) 23 – 28 March
	Rider	Nation	Horse/Horses	Penalties (Total)	Time
1	Steve Guerdat	(Switzerland)	Corbinian	0	
2	Harrie Smolders	(Netherlands)	Emerald N.O.P.	3	65.45
3	Daniel Deusser	(Germany)	Cornet d’Amour	3	66.17

== 2017 ==
2016 - 2017 FEI World Cup Jumping Series

World Cup Finals at Omaha (USA) 30 March – 2 April
	Rider	Nation	Horse/Horses	Penalties (Total)
1	McLain Ward	(United States)	HH Azur	0
2	Romain Duguet	(Switzerland)	Twentytwo des Biches	4
3	Henrik von Eckermann	(Sweden)	Mary Lou	8

== 2018 ==
World Cup Finals at Paris (FRA) 10 April – 15 April
	Rider	Nation	Horse/Horses	Penalties (Total)
1	Beezie Madden	(United States)	Breitling LS	4
2	Devin Ryan	(United States)	Eddie Blue	6
3	Henrik von Eckermann	(Sweden)	Toveks Mary Lou	8

== 2019 ==
World Cup Finals at Gothenburg (SWE) 3–7 April 2019
	Rider	Nation	Horse/Horses	Penalties (Total)
1	Steve Guerdat	(Switzerland)	Alamo	2
2	Martin Fuchs	(Switzerland)	Clooney 51	3
3	Peder Fredricson	(Sweden)	Catch Me Not S	5

== 2020 ==
World Cup Finals at Las Vegas (USA) 15 April - 19 April

- Cancelled due to the COVID-19 pandemic

== 2021 ==
World Cup Finals at Gothenburg (SWE) 31 March - 4 April

- Cancelled due to an outbreak of Equid alphaherpesvirus 1

== 2022 ==
World Cup Finals at Leipzig (GER) 6 April - 10 April
	Rider	Nation	Horse/Horses	Penalties (Total)	Time
1	Martin Fuchs	(Switzerland)	Chaplin, The Sinner	5	60.83
2	Harrie Smolders	(Netherlands)	Monaco	8	61.99
3	Jens Fredricson	(Sweden)	Markan Cosmopolit	8	62.35

== 2023 ==
World Cup Finals at Omaha, Nebraska (USA) April 4–8
	Rider	Nation	Horse/Horses
1	Henrik von Eckermann	(Sweden)	King Edward
2	Harrie Smolders	(Netherlands)	Monaco N.o.p.
3	Hunter Holloway	(United States)	Pepita Con Spita

== 2024 ==
World Cup Finals at Riyadh, Saudi Arabia, April 16–20
	Rider	Nation	Horse/Horses	Penalties (Total)
1	Henrik von Eckermann	(Sweden)	King Edward	0
2	Julien Epaillard	(France)	Dubai du Cedre	4
3	Peder Fredricson	(Sweden)	Catch Me Not S	6

== 2025 ==
World Cup Finals at Basel, Switzerland, April 3–6
	Rider	Nation	Horse/Horses	Penalties (Total)
1	Julien Epaillard	(France)	Donatello d'Auge	4
2	Ben Maher	(United Kingdom)	Point Break	7
3	Kevin Staut	(France)	Visconti du Telman	7

== 2026 ==
World Cup Finals at Fort Worth, United States, April 9–12
	Rider	Nation	Horse/Horses	Penalties (Total)
1	Kent Farrington	(United States)	Greya	4
2	Daniel Deusser	(Germany)	Otello de Guldenboom	7
3	Katherine A. Dinan	(United States)	Out of the Blue SCF	9
