= Loro Piana TomBoy =

Show jumping horse

- Breed: Irish Sport Horse
- Sire: Coevers (Thoroughbred)
- Grandsire: Nantallah (Thoroughbred)
- Dam: Francis (ISH)
- Maternal grandsire: Jab
- Sex: Gelding
- Foaled: 1985
- Country: County Clare, Ireland
- Colour: Bay, star
- Owner: Heidi Hauri

Olympic medal record

Equestrian
Bronze medal – third place	1996 Atlanta	Team jumping

Loro Piana TomBoy VI was a horse ridden by Rodrigo Pessoa in international show jumping competition. The powerful grand prix showjumper was notable for his unusual jumping style, which saw him loosely dangle his front legs while jumping, thus necessitating that he clear the obstacles with several feet of extra "air". Tomboy managed to clear the jumps as well or even better than his competitors. He stood 17.0 hh (173 cm). He died in 2014 at the age of 31.

Rodrigo Pessoa described the mount as a true battler, a horse that gave everything and above all gave Brazil its first ever Olympic medal in show-jumping.

== Injury ==
When TomBoy was six or seven years old, he had an accident with his previous owner where he was startled by a vehicle and fell off a 2-3 meter bridge, injuring his front legs. One leg remained crooked as a result. When Pessoa acquired him, he stated that TomBoy was recovering very well over the years. When they began to jump, TomBoy could no longer tuck in his front legs to clear the obstacles. Subsequently, TomBoy over-jumped the obstacles letting his front feet hang. Pessoa claimed it was a very funny way of jumping, however in return, he was very scopey and brave.

== Success ==
Loro Piana TomBoy and Rodrigo Pessoa became a successful pair early on in their career. Their first monuments achievement was their winning round at the 1996 Atlanta Olympics, which won Brazil their first Olympic medal. Also in 1996, they competed in the Calgary Alberta Masters six bar competition. They proved their upstanding relationship by jumping clear round after clear round, sharing the winning trophy with Switzerland's grand prix rider Beat Mandli. Pessoa thought TomBoy's round was good enough to take him to the Du Maurier Grand Prix the following Sunday. The team took a rail in the first round in the Du Maurier Grand Prix however still qualified for the second round. Although Pessoa feared that the course was too demanding for TomBoy, they successfully came out with a clear their second time around.
