= Special Envoy (horse) =

- Breed: Irish Sport Horse
- Sire: King of Diamonds
- Grandsire: Errigal
- Dam: High Valley
- Sex: Gelding
- Foaled: 1980
- Country: Ireland
- Colour: Chestnut, star, near hind sock
- Breeder: Mary Hughes

Special Envoy
Medal record

Equestrian

Pan American Games
Gold medal – first place	1995 Mar del Plata	Team jumping

Special Envoy (1980 – 2010) was an Irish Sport Horse ridden by Rodrigo Pessoa. He won many top international competitions in the sport of show jumping. He stood 16.3 hh (170 cm).

Special Envoy was first jumped with success as a novice in Ireland by Marion Hughes, who is also related to his breeder. He was then sold by Marion's father Seamus Hughes to Nelson Pessoa. Nelson had a lot of success on him before passing the ride to his son Rodrigo.

== Major achievements ==
- 1991 FEI World Cup Final, Gothenburg - 2nd with Nelson Pessoa to Milton and John Whitaker - (winner of the second leg)
- 1992 Olympic Games, Barcelona - 9th with Rodrigo Pessoa
- 1994 World Equestrian Games, The Hague - 4th team Brazil and 8th individual with Rodrigo Pessoa
- 1995 Pan American Games, Mar del Plata - team Gold medal
- 1996 FEI World Cup Final, Geneva - 4th

=== International wins ===
- 1989 Dublin Grand Prix
- 1990 Nice Grand Prix
- 1990 Donaueschinger Grand Prix
- 1991 Zuidlaren Grand Prix
- 1991 Aachen Nations Cup - double clear
- 1991 Padenborn Grand Prix
- 1992 Malenes Grand Prix
- 1992 International Championship Germany
- 1993 Wiesbaden Grand Prix
- 1993 Paris Grand Prix
- 1993 Eindhoven Derby
- 1994 Aachen Grand Prix
- 1994 Aarhus Grand Prix
- 1996 Dortmund Grand Prix
