= Daniel Deusser =

German equestrian (born 1981)

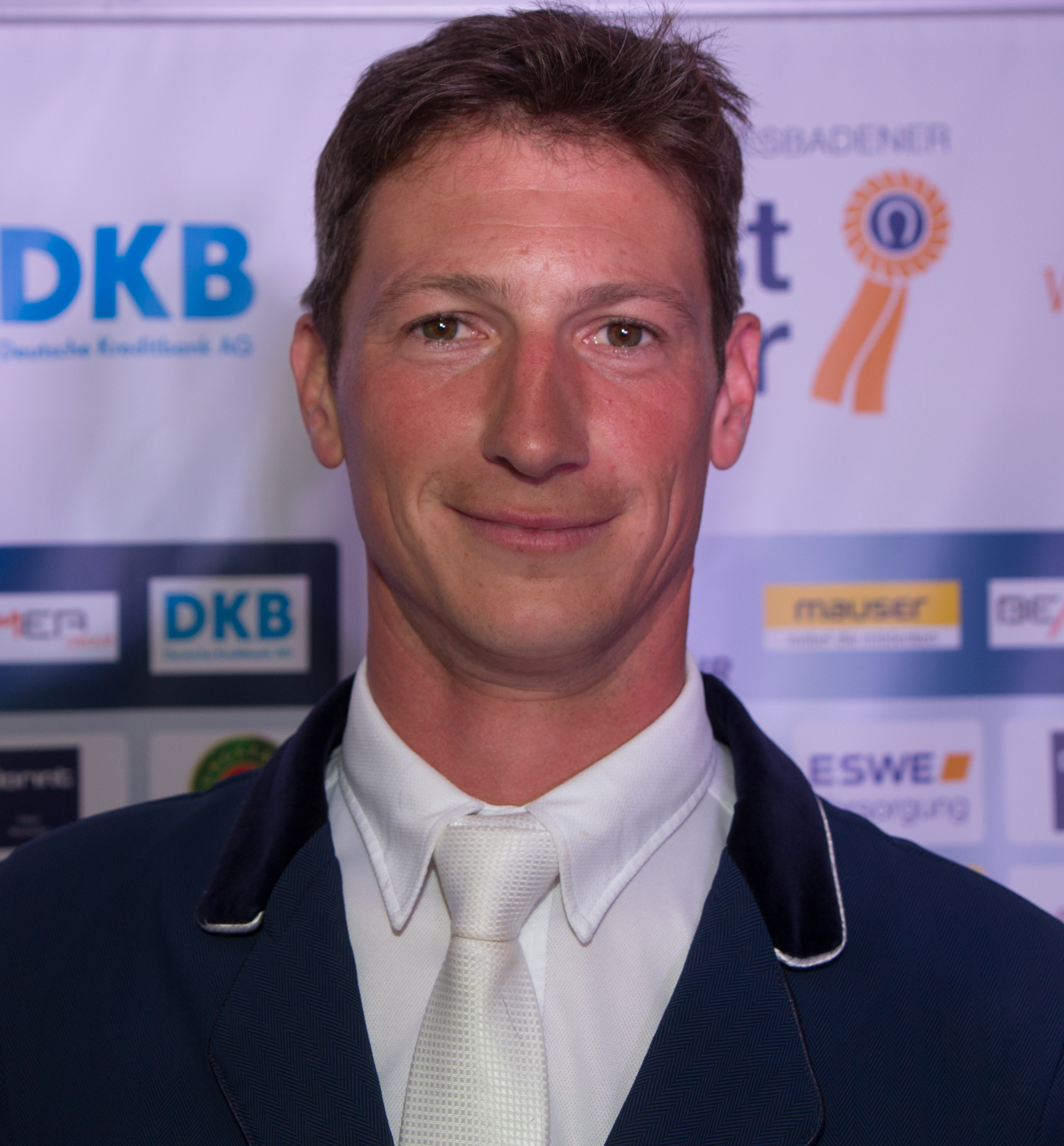

Personal information
- Native name: Daniel Deußer
- Nationality: German
- Born: 13 August 1981 (age 45)
- Height: 1.90 m (6 ft 3 in)
- Weight: 76 kg (168 lb)

Sport
- Country: Germany
- Sport: Equestrianism
Medal record
Olympic Games
Bronze medal – third place	2016 Rio de Janeiro	Team jumping
World Championships
Gold medal – first place	2026 Aachen	Team jumping
European Championships
Silver medal – second place	2013 Herning	Team jumping
Silver medal – second place	2015 Aachen	Team jumping
World Cup
Gold medal – first place	2014 Lyon	Individual jumping
Silver medal – second place	2007 Las Vegas	Individual jumping
Silver medal – second place	2026 Fort Worth	Individual jumping
Bronze medal – third place	2016 Gothenburg	Individual jumping

Daniel Deusser (German: Daniel Deußer; born 13 August 1981) is a German equestrian and Olympic bronze medalist. He represented his country at the 2016 Summer Olympics. He is nicknamed "Double D." His career reached a higher level starting from 2002, when he was part of team Germany at the Young Rider European Championships. With his top partner Killer Queen, he was selected to represent Germany at Rio de Janeiro Olympic Games in 2016. Daniel Deusser is the current world number five (March 2022).

== International championship results ==
Results
Year	Event	Horse	Placing	Notes
2002	European Young Rider Championships	Zaperlot FRH	4th	Team
2002	European Young Rider Championships	Zaperlot FRH	26th	Individual
2007	World Cup Final	Air Jordan Z	2nd place, silver medalist(s)	
2013	European Championships	Cornet d'Amour	2nd place, silver medalist(s)	Team
2013	European Championships	Cornet d'Amour	5th	Individual
2014	World Cup Final	Cornet d'Amour	1st place, gold medalist(s)	
2014	World Equestrian Games	Cornet d'Amour	4th	Team
2014	World Equestrian Games	Cornet d'Amour	6th	Individual
2015	World Cup Final	Cornet d'Amour	14th	
2015	European Championships	Cornet d'Amour	2nd place, silver medalist(s)	Team
2015	European Championships	Cornet d'Amour	24th	Individual
2016	World Cup Final	Cornet d'Amour	3rd place, bronze medalist(s)	
2016	Olympic Games	First Class van Eeckelghem	3rd place, bronze medalist(s)	Team
2016	Olympic Games	First Class van Eeckelghem	9th	Individual
2018	World Cup Final	Cornet d'Amour	8th	
2019	World Cup Final	Scuderia 1918 Tobago Z	4th	
2019	European Championships	Scuderia 1918 Tobago Z	2nd place, silver medalist(s)	Team
2019	European Championships	Scuderia 1918 Tobago Z	14th	Individual
2020	Longines Global Champions Tour	Killer Queen	1st	
EL = Eliminated; RET = Retired; WD = Withdrew
