= Nelson Pessoa =

Brazilian equestrian (born 1935)

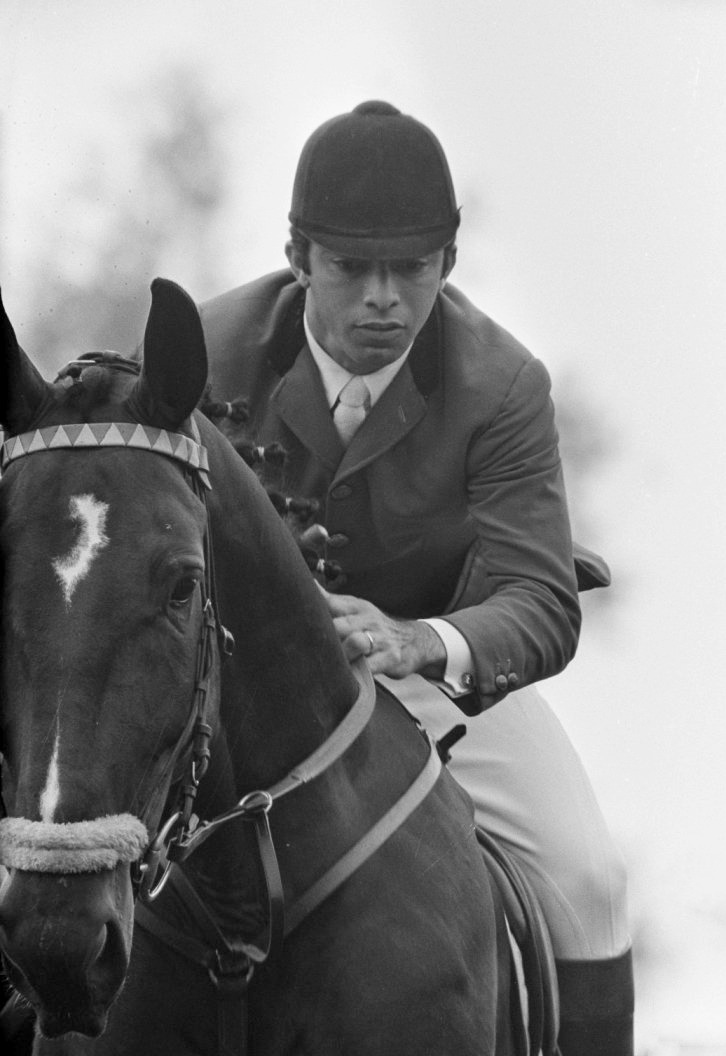
- Nelson Pessoa on Feldherr in 1968

Medal record

Equestrian

Representing Brazil

Pan American Games
Gold medal – first place	1967 Winnipeg	Team jumping
Silver medal – second place	1959 Chicago	Team jumping
Silver medal – second place	1967 Winnipeg	Individual jumping

Nelson Pessoa Filho (born December 16, 1935) is a Brazilian equestrian who competed in the sport of Show jumping. He was among the first Brazilian civilians to do well in the sport, as the military had dominated it in the Brazil of that era.

== Career highlights ==
He competed in the 1956 Summer Olympics and came fifth in Equestrian at the 1964 Summer Olympics - Individual jumping. He moved to Europe in 1961. He won the 1966 European Show Jumping Championships and won twice at Hickstead. He came second in the 1984 Show Jumping World Cup, and in 1991 he was again second, riding Special Envoy. In 1992 Summer Olympics in Barcelona at 56 he was the oldest equestrian, while his 19-year-old son was the youngest.

He owns a famous equestrian school at Haras du Ligny in Fleurus, Belgium. His students include Alvaro de Miranda Neto and Athina Onassis Miranda. His son is the Olympic gold medallist Rodrigo Pessoa.

His nickname is Neco.

He is the founder of Pessoa Brands; the Pessoa lines include their famous saddles, bridles, girths, blankets and tack.
