= Ralf Schneider =

German footballer

Personal information
- Date of birth: 25 August 1986 (age 40)
- Place of birth: Darmstadt, West Germany
- Height: 1.80 m (5 ft 11 in)
- Position: Left midfielder

Youth career
- –2005: Eintracht Frankfurt

Senior career*
Years	Team	Apps	(Gls)
2005–2008	Eintracht Frankfurt II		
2009–2012	FSV Frankfurt II		
2010–2012	FSV Frankfurt	4	(0)
2012–2015	Rot-Weiss Oberhausen	83	(3)
2013	Rot-Weiss Oberhausen II	1	(0)
2015–2017	SC Hessen Dreieich	27	(6)
2017–2019	Hammer SpVg	55	(16)
- * Club domestic league appearances and goals

Ralf Schneider (born 25 August 1986) is a German former professional footballer who played as a left midfielder.
