= Willem Greve =

Dutch equestrian

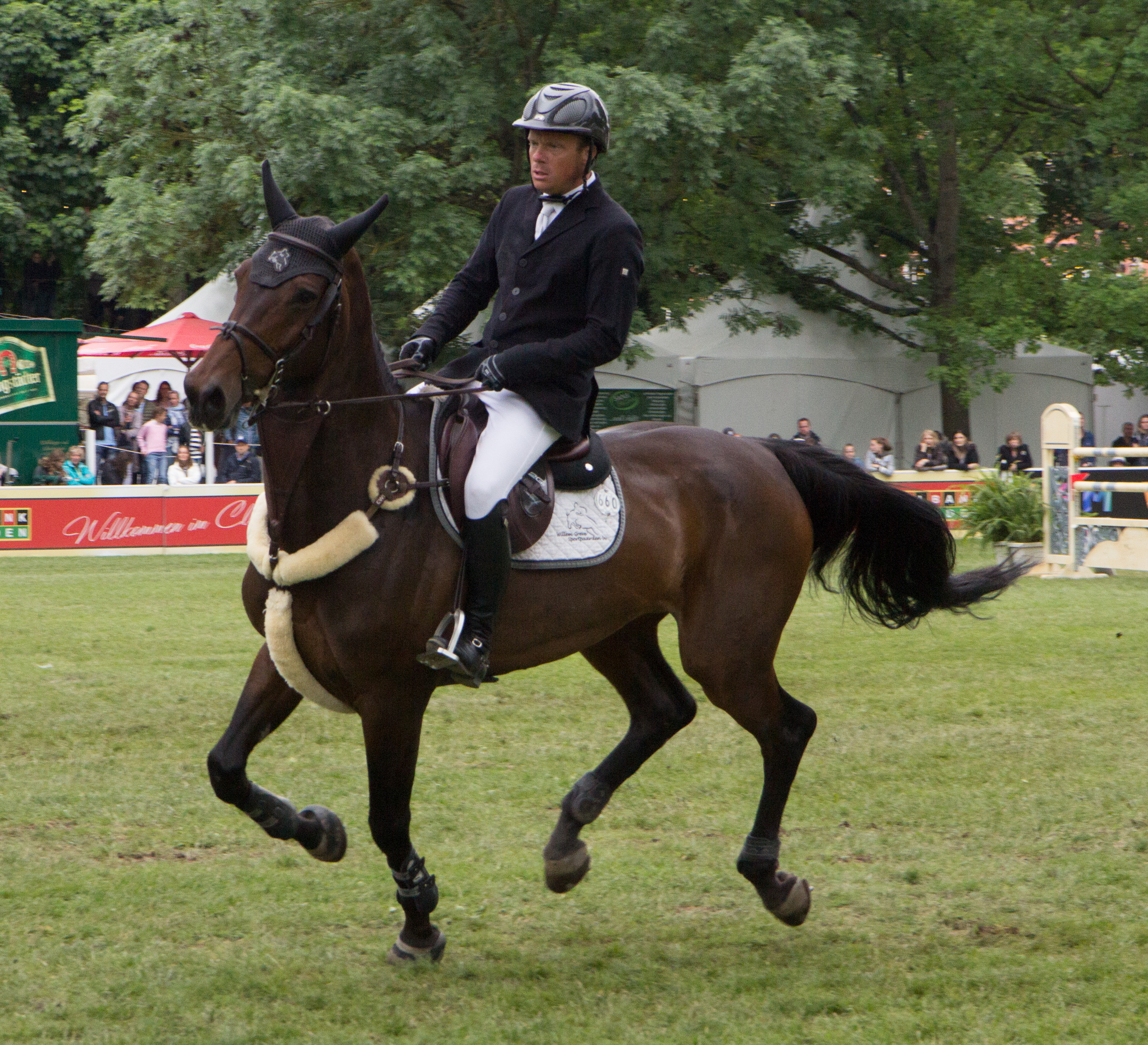
- Greve in 2018

Personal information
- Nationality: Dutch
- Born: 26 February 1983 (age 43) Haaksbergen, Netherlands

Sport
- Sport: Equestrian
- Event: Show jumping

Willem Greve (born 26 February 1983) is a Dutch show jumping competitor.

He represented the Netherlands at the 2020 Summer Olympics in Tokyo 2021, competing in individual jumping. In the Team jumping competition, he was part of the Dutch team that qualified for the final, where the Dutch team placed fourth. (Greve did not compete in the final.)
