= Rodrigo Pessoa =

Brazilian equestrian

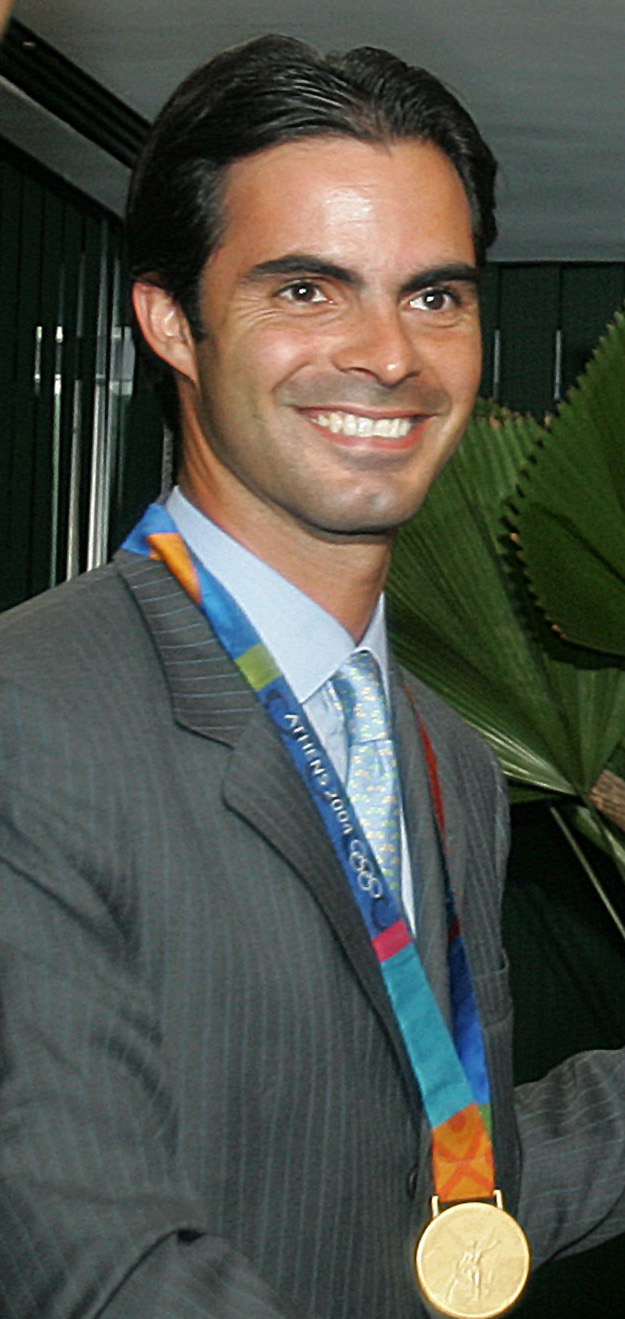
- Pessoa in 2005

Personal information
- Full name: Rodrigo de Paula Pessoa
- Nationality: Brazilian
- Born: 29 November 1972 (age 53); Paris, France
- Height: 177 cm (5 ft 10 in)
Medal record
Equestrian
Representing Brazil
Olympic Games
Gold medal – first place	2004 Athens	Individual jumping
Bronze medal – third place	1996 Atlanta	Team jumping
Bronze medal – third place	2000 Sydney	Team jumping
World Championships
Gold medal – first place	1998 Rome	Individual jumping
FEI Nations Cup
Silver medal – second place	2013 Barcelona	Team jumping
Pan American Games
Gold medal – first place	1995 Buenos Aires	Team jumping
Gold medal – first place	2007 Rio de Janeiro	Team jumping
Silver medal – second place	2007 Rio de Janeiro	Individual jumping
Silver medal – second place	2011 Guadalajara	Team jumping
Bronze medal – third place	2023 Santiago	Team jumping

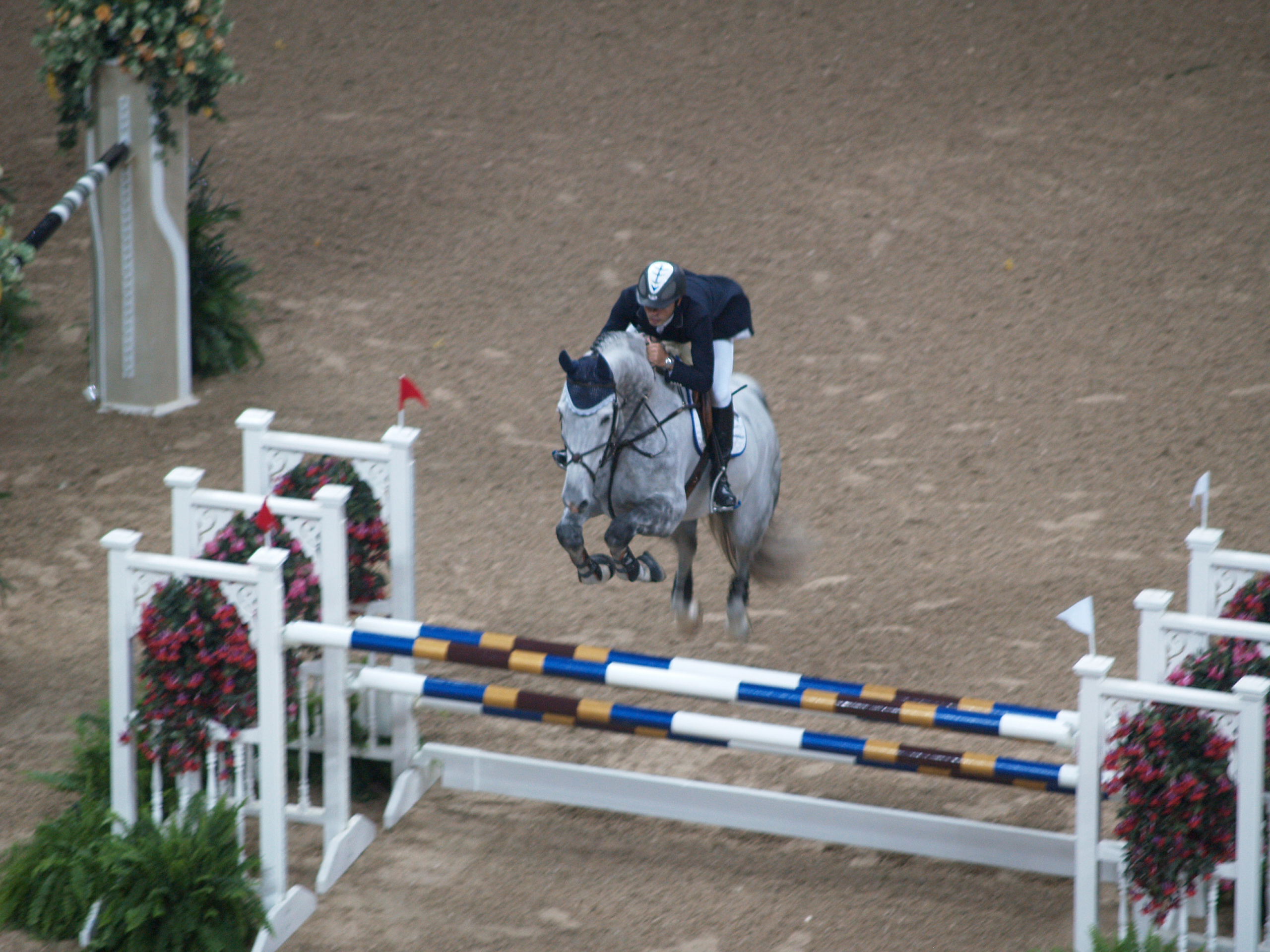
Pessoa and his mount Coeur

Rodrigo de Paula Pessoa (born 29 November 1972 in Paris, France) is a Brazilian equestrian specialized in show jumping. The son of fellow equestrian Nelson Pessoa, Pessoa is considered one of the most talented of his generation, being an Olympic Games gold medalist in individual jumping and having over 70 Grand Prix wins. He has represented Brazil at 8 Olympic Games second most appearances behind Ian Millar which has 10.

== Riding career ==
Pessoa first competed in 1981 at Hickstead. In 1984, he claimed his first title as champion of the pony class, again in 1985. In 1988, he competed in his first Grand Prix.

He continued to build up his triumphant career by competing and winning many Grands Prix. In 1992, he rode Special Envoy in the Olympic Games in Barcelona for Brazil, making him one of the youngest riders to compete in the Olympics at the age of 19. In 1996, he again rode in the Olympics in Atlanta and helped Brazil win the bronze medal with Loro Piana TomBoy.

In 1998, he rode Gandini Lianos to be the youngest World Champion at 1998 FEI World Equestrian Games in Rome.

Pessoa took his career further by winning the World Cup Final on Baloubet du Rouet for three consecutive years in 1998, 1999, and 2000 a feat that has to this day been unmatched. He later claimed the title and prize for the world's best rider and in addition to the Show Jumping Year trophy.He has been ranked Number 1 in the World on the FEI Rankings. In 2000, he again won the bronze team medal at the Olympic Games in Sydney, and in spite of being a favorite to win the individual tournament, wound up disqualified once Baloubet twice refused to jump. In the 2004 Olympics in Athens, he won the individual silver medal, but after the disqualification of the Irish rider Cian O'Connor and his horse Waterford Crystal for doping, he was awarded the gold medal in an award ceremony in Rio de Janeiro.

In 2007, Pessoa won the individual silver and team gold medals at the Pan American Games, held in his hometown of Rio de Janeiro.

Pessoa attracted controversy in 2008 when he was suspended by the FEI after his horse Rufus failed a doping test at the 2008 Olympic games. Pessoa was fined 2,000 Swiss francs and was suspended from international competitions for four and a half months.

In 2010, he finished fourth individually and fourth with his team of Brazil at the World Equestrian Games in Lexington, KY. In 2011, he again mounted the podium at the Pan American Games in Guadalajara, Mexico, with Team Brazil to collect a silver medal on HH Ashley.

He was also chosen to be Brazil's flag bearer at the 2012 Summer Olympics in London.

Not wanting to be a substitute in the Brazilian squad that would compete in the 2016 Summer Olympics held in Rio de Janeiro, Pessoa skipped the games and conceded his spot to Felipe Amaral, and instead covered the Olympics as a commentator for a French television channel. In the 2020 Summer Olympics in Tokyo, Pessoa only took part in the team qualifier, withdrawing from participating in the finals after his horse Carlito's Way 6 refused twice on course.

In 2017, Horse Sport Ireland announced Pessoa as the new Irish showjumping team manager. As chief for Team Ireland, they won the 2017 European title in Gothenburg, and in 2019 got Ireland qualified for the 2020 Tokyo Olympics by winning the FEI Nation's Cup final. At the end of 2019, he ended his cooperation with Horse Sport Ireland to dedicate time to his family and riding career. He rides for James H. Clark and Artemis Farms in Wellington and Greenwich.

== Personal life ==
He married Alexa Weeks in 2009 and has 3 daughters Cecilia, Sophia, and Luciana. In 2019 they moved to her hometown of Wilton, Connecticut. He operates his business called Amethyst Equestrian with his wife Alexa from his farm in North Salem, New York just outside New York City and Wellington in the winter months.

== International Championship results ==
Results
Year	Event	Horse	Placing	Notes
1990	World Equestrian Games	Special Envoy	8th	Team
1990	World Equestrian Games	Special Envoy	23rd	Individual
1992	Olympic Games	Special Envoy	10th	Team
1992	Olympic Games	Special Envoy	9th	Individual
1993	World Cup Final	Special Envoy	13th	
1994	World Equestrian Games	Special Envoy	4th	Team
1994	World Equestrian Games	Special Envoy	8th	Individual
1996	World Cup Final	Tomboy	4th	
1996	Olympic Games	Tomboy	3rd place, bronze medalist(s)	Team
1996	Olympic Games	Tomboy	9th	Individual
1998	World Cup Final	Baloubet du Rouet	1st place, gold medalist(s)	
1998	World Equestrian Games	Gandini Lianos	5th	Team
1998	World Equestrian Games	Gandini Lianos	1st place, gold medalist(s)	Individual
1999	World Cup Final	Baloubet du Rouet	1st place, gold medalist(s)	
2000	World Cup Final	Baloubet du Rouet	1st place, gold medalist(s)	
2000	Olympic Games	Baloubet du Rouet	3rd place, bronze medalist(s)	Team
2000	Olympic Games	Baloubet du Rouet	27th	Individual
2001	World Cup Final	Baloubet du Rouet	2nd place, silver medalist(s)	
2002	World Cup Final	Baloubet du Rouet	3rd place, bronze medalist(s)	
2002	World Equestrian Games	Baloubet du Rouet	9th	Team
2002	World Equestrian Games	Baloubet du Rouet	26th	Individual
2003	World Cup Final	Baloubet du Rouet	2nd place, silver medalist(s)	
2004	World Cup Final	Baloubet du Rouet	38th	
2004	Olympic Games	Baloubet du Rouet	9th	Team
2004	Olympic Games	Baloubet du Rouet	1st place, gold medalist(s)	Individual
2005	World Cup Final	Baloubet du Rouet	7th	
2007	World Cup Final	Oasis	31st	
2007	Pan American Games	HH Rufus	1st place, gold medalist(s)	Team
2007	Pan American Games	HH Rufus	2nd place, silver medalist(s)	Individual
2008	Olympic Games	HH Rufus	DSQ	Team
2008	Olympic Games	HH Rufus	DSQ	Individual
2009	World Cup Final	HH Rufus	5th	
2010	World Cup Final	HH Lets Fly	16th	
2010	World Equestrian Games	HH Rebozo	4th	Team
2010	World Equestrian Games	HH Rebozo	4th	Individual
2011	Pan American Games	HH Ashley	2nd place, silver medalist(s)	Team
2011	Pan American Games	HH Ashley	26th	Individual
2012	Olympic Games	HH Rebozo	8th	Team
2012	Olympic Games	HH Rebozo	22nd	Individual
2014	World Equestrian Games	Status	5th	Team
2014	World Equestrian Games	Status	21st	Individual
EL = Eliminated; RET = Retired; WD = Withdrew; DSQ = Disqualified

== Horses ==
- Tinkabell-2006 Grey, Mare KWPN
- HH Ashley – 2000, Chestnut, Mare, Hanoverian
- HH Rebozo – 2000, Bay, Stallion, Mexican Sport Horse
- HH Palouchin de Ligny – 2000, Chestnut, Gelding, (SF)
- HH Let's Fly – 1999, Bay, Gelding, Hanoverian
- HH Rufus – 1998, Bay, Gelding, (KWPN)
- HH Oasis – Bay, Gelding, (SF). Died in 2007
- Baloubet du Rouet – 1989, Chestnut, Stallion, (SF)
- Loro Piana TomBoy – 1985, Bay, Gelding, (ISH)
- Special Envoy – 1980, Chestnut, Gelding, (ISH)
- Gandini Lianos – 1987, Bay, Gelding, (Holst)
- Stardust – 1991, Bay, Mare, (ISH)

Olympic Games
Preceded by Isabel Clark Ribeiro	Flagbearer for Brazil; London 2012	Succeeded by Jaqueline Mourão
