= Hugo Simon =

Austrian equestrian

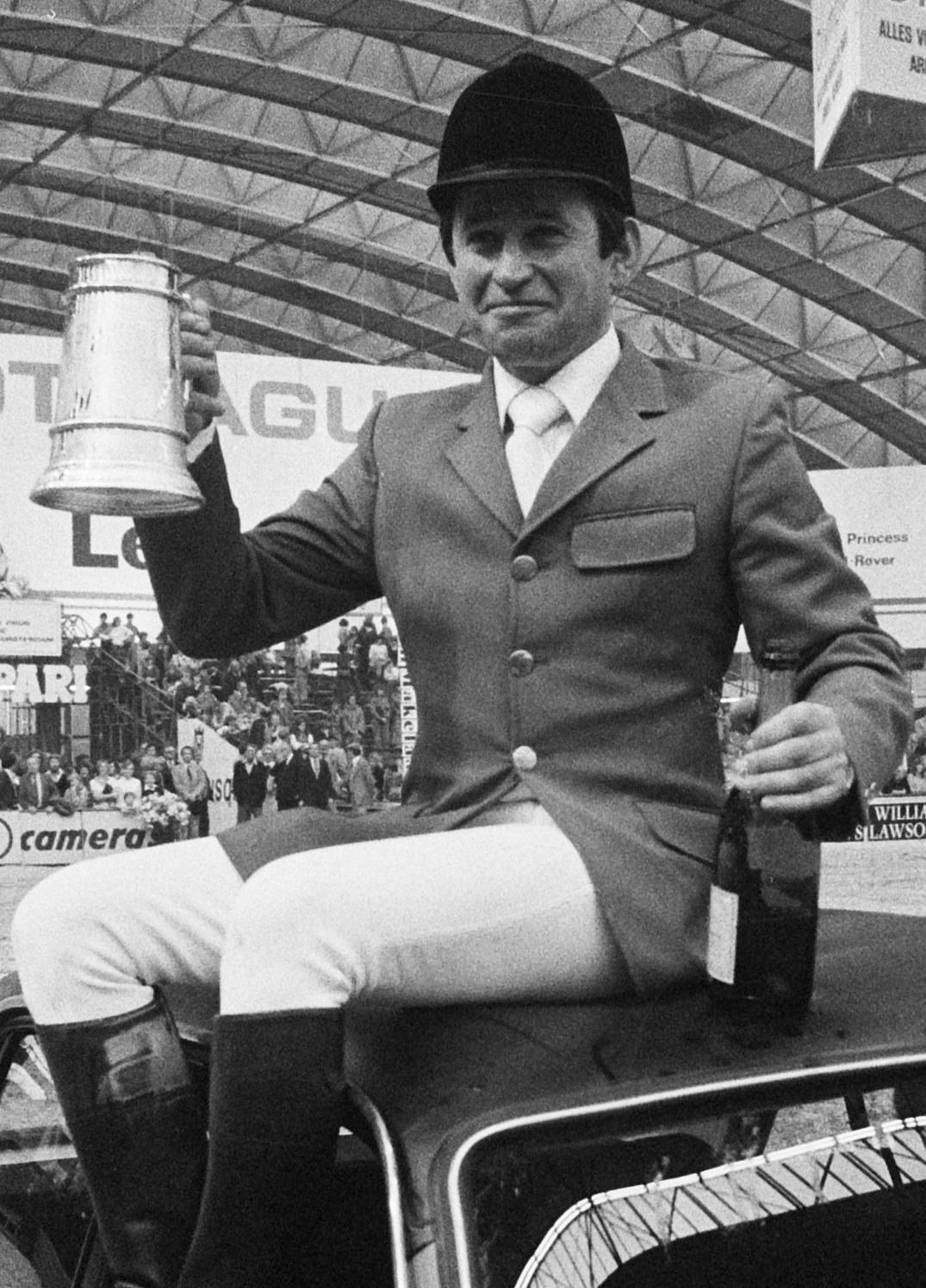
- Hugo Simon at Jumping Amsterdam 1978, which he won

Personal information
- Born: 3 August 1942 (age 83) Křivá Voda, present-day Czech Republic
- Height: 1.62 m (5 ft 4 in)
- Weight: 65 kg (143 lb)

Sport
- Sport: Horse riding
- Club: RC Schloß Graschnitz, Sankt Marein im Mürztal
Medal record
Representing Austria
Olympic Games
Silver medal – second place	Barcelona 1992	Team jumping

Hugo Simon (born 3 August 1942) is an Olympic medal-winning show jumper who took part in six Olympics between 1972 and 1996 (1980 excepted). Before his first Olympic appearance, he competed for West Germany, but in 1972 became an Austrian citizen.

He won a silver medal at age 49 at the team event at the 1992 Olympics on the horse Apricot D. Four years later, at age 53, he came fourth in the individual event after a jump-off involving seven riders competing for two medals.

He was the first person to win three World Cup titles, at the inaugural 1979 contest (on Gladstone) and also in 1997 and 1998 (both on E.T.). This feat was later matched by Rodrigo Pessoa in 2000 ,Meredith Michaels-Beerbaum in 2009, Marcus Ehning 2010 and Steve Guerdat 2019.

Simon is a businessman who has always considered show jumping a favorite hobby. He was still competing as of 2011, at age 68. He is regarded as the oldest winner of a show jumping Grand Prix, as he won the Grand Prix of Ebreichsdorf (CSI 2*) in May 2011.

Simon competed at his first Olympics in 1972 riding Lavendel. This followed by numerous Grand Prix's nations cups and another four Olympic Games, with The Freak, Gipsy Lady, Apricot D and E.T. Although Simon has had many successful horses it is with the showjumping great E.T. he is best known, along with E.T. Simon won many grand prix's and championships including the Aachen Grand prix in 1998 as well as the world cup final in 1997.

Horses
- Amaretto I – Alexis Z x Gotthard (7 May 1982)
- Answer – x ()
- Apricot D – Alexis Z x Gotthard (1984)
- Caldato – Caretino x Landgraf I (1 May 2007)
- Coco Chanel – x ()
- Especiale – Voltaire x Ulft (1 January 1986)
- E.T. FRH – Espri x Garibaldi II (21 April 1987)
- Explosiv – Espri x (21 May 1992)
- Gipsy Lady – Gardestern I x Davos (1 January 1982)
- Gladstone – Götz x Weingau (1969)
- Gondoso – Gonzales x Landmeister (1986)
- Jasper – Courville xx x Nizam (23 March 1968)
- Lavendel – Lateran x Welf (1960)
- Magnum E – Wörth x Manometer (1982)
- Pasoa Dice – x ()
- Sir Piroth – Seydlitz x (1 January 1988)
- The Freak – Lucky Boy xx x Banko (1 January 1976)
- Ukinda – Emilion x Satanas de Vaux (1997)
- Wahre Liebe – Werther x Graphit (1989)
- Winzer – x ()
Competition results
- 07 – Dortmund Germany, 1.50 Group comp. (1.50 Group comp.) – Ukinda 15 March 2008
- 09 – Dortmund Germany, 1.45 Against the clock (1.45 Against the clock) – Caldato 15 March 2008
- 03 – Dortmund Germany, 1.45 Against the clock (1.45 Against the clock) – Caldato 14 March 2008
- 05 – Aachen, Stawag-Prize (Stawag-Prize) – Caldato 19 May 2006
- 05 – Aachen, Baltic Horse Show "Ladies vs. Men" – 1.45 Winning round (Baltic Horse Show "Ladies vs. Men" – 1.45 Winning round) – Caldato 17 May 2006
- 02 – Linz, Austria, Nations Cup (Nations Cup) – Caldato 14 May 2006
- 02 – Linz, Austria, Nations Cup (Nations Cup) – Caldato 14 May 2006
- 03 – Linz, Austria, Preis der Draeger Medical – 1.45 Two phases (Preis der Draeger Medical – 1.45 Two phases) – Caldato 13 May 2006
- 03 – Linz, Austria, Preis der Draeger Medical – 1.45 Two phases (Preis der Draeger Medical – 1.45 Two phases) – Caldato 13 May 2006
- 44 – Neumunster Germany, Neumunster Grand Prix (Neumunster Grand Prix) – Caldato 19 February 2006
- 06 – Neumunster Germany, Grosser Preis der E.ON Sales and Trading GmbH – 1.60 Mixed comp. (Grosser Preis der E.ON Sales and Trading GmbH – 1.60 Mixed comp.) – Pasoa Dice 18 February 2006
- 09 – Neumunster Germany, Arienheller Premium Cup – 1.60 Against the clock (Arienheller Premium Cup – 1.60 Against the clock) – Caldato 17 February 2006
- 11 – Frankfurt, Grand Prix (Grand Prix) – Caldato 18 December 2005
- 07 – Dortmund Germany, 1.45 Speed and handiness (1.45 Speed and handiness) – Coco Chanel 16 March 2002
- 01 – Berlin, Audi Championat Finale 01 (Audi Championat Finale 01) – ET 24 November 2001
- 08 – Berlin, Championat Von Berlin (Championat Von Berlin) – Explosiv 23 November 2001
- 05 – Berlin, Audi Championat Finale 02 (Audi Championat Finale 02) – ET 22 November 2001
- 01 – Linz, Austria, Grand Prix (Grand Prix) – ET 16 September 2001
- 17 – Aachen, Grand Prix (Grand Prix) – ET 17 June 2001
- 05 – Aachen, Prize of Tuchfabrik Becker (Prize of Tuchfabrik Becker) – Explosiv 15 June 2001
- 01 – Aachen, Prize of ELSA AG (Prize of ELSA AG) – ET 12 June 2001
- 01 – Aachen, Prize of ELSA AG (Prize of ELSA AG) – ET 12 June 2001
- 07 – Dortmund Germany, Dortmund Grand Prix (Dortmund Grand Prix) – ET 11 March 2001
- 18 – Dortmund Germany, World Cup Qualifier (World Cup Qualifier) – ET 10 March 2001
- 10 – Dortmund Germany, 1.50 Against the clock (1.50 Against the clock) – ET 9 March 2001
- 07 – Stuttgart, Germany, Stuttgart Grand Prix (Stuttgart Grand Prix) – ET 19 November 2000
- 07 – Düsseldorf, Germany, Grand Prix (Grand Prix) – ET 15 October 2000
- 01 – Rotterdam, Netherlands, Rotterdam Grand Prix (Rotterdam Grand Prix) – ET 27 August 2000
- 02 – Aachen, Masters (Masters) – ET 14 July 2000
- 06 – Helsinki Finland, Helsinki Grand Prix (Helsinki Grand Prix) – ET 18 June 2000
- 05 – Zurich, Zurich Grand Prix (Zurich Grand Prix) – ET 18 March 2000
- 22 – Bordeaux, Prix Paris Turf (Table C) (Prix Paris Turf (Table C) ) – Sir Piroth 13 February 2000
- 07 – Bordeaux, Grand Prix Montres Pequignet (Grand Prix Montres Pequignet) – ET 13 February 2000
- 26 – Bordeaux, Prix de la Foire Internationale de Bordeaux (Prix de la Foire Internationale de Bordeaux ) – Explosiv 13 February 2000
- 15 – Bordeaux, Prix BMW Accumulator (Prix BMW Accumulator ) – Explosiv 12 February 2000
- 15 – Bordeaux, Prix Equidia (Prix Equidia) – Sir Piroth 12 February 2000
- 17 – Bordeaux, Prix du Comite Des Expositions De Bordeaux (Prix du Comite Des Expositions De Bordeaux ) – Explosiv 11 February 2000
- 20 – Bordeaux, World Cup preliminary round (World Cup preliminary round) – ET 11 February 2000
- 07 – Amsterdam, World Cup Qualifier (World Cup Qualifier ) – ET 4 December 1999
- 15 – Frankfurt, Grand Prix (Grand Prix) – ET 12 October 1999
- 03 – Munchen-Riem, Germany, Grand Prix (Grand Prix) – Wahre Liebe 13 May 1999
- 06 – Berlin, Berlin Grand Prix (Berlin Grand Prix) – ET 23 November 1998
- 01 – Stuttgart, Germany, Stuttgart Grand Prix (Stuttgart Grand Prix) – ET 22 November 1998
- 01 – Neumunster Germany, Neumunster Grand Prix (Neumunster Grand Prix) – Apricot D 22 September 1998
- 06 – Aachen, Prize of Licher Privatbrauerei (Prize of Licher Privatbrauerei) – Especiale 15 August 1998
- 05 – Aachen, Prize of Tuchfabrik Becker (Prize of Tuchfabrik Becker) – ET 14 August 1998
- 09 – Aachen, Nordrhein-Westfalen-Preis (Nordrhein-Westfalen-Preis) – Apricot D 13 August 1998
- 01 – Aachen, Prize of EXPO (Prize of EXPO) – ET 12 August 1998
- 03 – Aachen, Prize of Aachener (Prize of Aachener) – Apricot D 11 August 1998
- 01 – Aachen, Prize of ELSA AG (Prize of ELSA AG) – ET 11 August 1998
- 01 – Aachen, Grand Prix (Grand Prix) – ET 24 July 1998
- 01 – Aachen, Preis von Europa (Preis von Europa) – ET 23 July 1998
- 01 – Geesteren, Netherlands, Grand Prix (Grand Prix) – ET 17 July 1998
- 02 – Dortmund Germany, Dortmund Grand Prix (Dortmund Grand Prix) – ET 10 March 1998
- 06 – Stuttgart, Germany, Mercedes Masters (Mercedes Masters ) – Apricot D 18 November 1997
- 02 – European championships., Individual (Individual) – ET 23 August 1997
- 09 – Aachen, Nations Cup (Nations Cup) – Apricot D 8 July 1997
- 01 – Hamburg, Germany, Hamburg Derby (Hamburg Derby) – Gondoso 3 June 1997
- 01 – World Cup Final, World Cup – 3rd Leg (World Cup – 3rd Leg) – ET 24 April 1997
- 01 – World Cup Final, World Cup – 2nd Leg (World Cup – 2nd Leg) – ET 24 April 1997
- 01 – World Cup Final, World Cup – 1st Leg (World Cup – 1st Leg) – ET 24 April 1997
- 01 – World Cup Final, World Cup Final (World Cup Final) – ET 21 April 1997
- 01 – Dortmund Germany, Dortmund Grand Prix (Dortmund Grand Prix) – ET 10 March 1997
- 01 – Berlin, Berlin Grand Prix (Berlin Grand Prix) – Apricot D 13 November 1996
- 01 – Monterry, Grand Prix (Grand Prix) – ET 17 August 1996
- 04 – Olympics, Individual (Individual) – ET 29 July 1996
- 14 -, Individual showjumping: First qualifying section (Individual showjumping: First qualifying section) – ET 27 July 1996
- 07 – Geesteren, Netherlands, Grand Prix (Grand Prix) – Magnum 5 July 1996
- 02 – Aachen, Grand Prix (Grand Prix) – ET 19 June 1996
- 06 – Aachen, Grand Prix (Grand Prix) – ET 17 June 1996
- 05 – Aachen, Preis von Europa (Preis von Europa) – ET 13 June 1996
- 10 – Aachen, Nations Cup (Nations Cup) – ET 11 June 1996
- 01 – World Cup Final, World Cup – 1st Leg (World Cup – 1st Leg) – ET 24 April 1996
- 01 – World Cup Final, World Cup Final (World Cup Final) – ET 21 April 1996
- 01 – Dortmund Germany, World Cup Qualifier (World Cup Qualifier) – ET 8 April 1996
- 04 – Zurich, Zurich Grand Prix (Zurich Grand Prix) – ET 25 March 1996
- 01 – s'Hertogenbosch, Netherlands, World Cup Qualifier (World Cup Qualifier) – Apricot D 18 March 1996
- 01 – Bologna, Gran Premio (Gran Premio) – ET 23 February 1996
- 04 – Bologna, World Cup Qualifier (World Cup Qualifier) – ET 23 February 1996
- 05 – Stuttgart, Germany, Stuttgart Grand Prix (Stuttgart Grand Prix) – Apricot D 14 November 1995
- 05 – Geesteren, Netherlands, Grand Prix (Grand Prix) – Apricot D 16 July 1995
- 01 – Hamburg, Germany, Hamburg Derby (Hamburg Derby) – ET 3 June 1995
- 02 – Dortmund Germany, Dortmund Grand Prix (Dortmund Grand Prix) – Apricot D 7 April 1995
- 07 – Zurich, Zurich Grand Prix (Zurich Grand Prix) – Apricot D 23 March 1995
- 12 – s'Hertogenbosch, Netherlands, World Cup Qualifier (World Cup Qualifier) – Apricot D 18 March 1995
- 10 – Geesteren, Netherlands, Grand Prix (Grand Prix) – Apricot D 12 June 1994
- 01 – Bruxelles, World Cup Qualifier (World Cup Qualifier) – Apricot D 5 April 1994
- 07 – Dortmund Germany, Dortmund Grand Prix (Dortmund Grand Prix) – Amaretto I 16 April 1993
- 01 – Aarhus, World Cup Qualifier (World Cup Qualifier) – Apricot D 2 April 1993
- 06 – Stuttgart, Germany, Mercedes Masters (Mercedes Masters ) – Apricot D 13 November 1992
- 24 – Olympics, Individual (Individual) – Apricot D 22 May 1992
- 01 – Antwerp, World Cup Qualifier (World Cup Qualifier) – Apricot D 13 October 1990
- 37 – Olympics, Individual (Individual) – Gipsy Lady 22 May 1988
- 01 – Dortmund Germany, World Cup Qualifier (World Cup Qualifier) – Winzer 8 April 1987
- 04 – Rotterdam, Netherlands, Nations Cup (Nations Cup) – The Freak 31 August 1986
- 06 – Donaueschingen, Germany, Nations Cup (Nations Cup) – The Freak 13 June 1986
- 01 – Berlin, Berlin Grand Prix (Berlin Grand Prix) – The Freak 14 November 1985
- 03 – Rotterdam, Netherlands, Nations Cup (Nations Cup) – The Freak 31 August 1985
- 01 – Göteborg Sweden, World Cup Qualifier (World Cup Qualifier) – The Freak 8 April 1985
- 03 – Dortmund Germany, World Cup Qualifier (World Cup Qualifier) – Gladstone 6 April 1985
- 07 – Bruxelles, World Cup Qualifier (World Cup Qualifier) – The Freak 23 June 1984
- 01 – Hamburg, Germany, Hamburg Derby (Hamburg Derby) – Gladstone 3 June 1984
- 22 – Olympics, Individual (Individual) – The Freak 22 May 1984
- 07 – Amsterdam, World Cup Qualifier (World Cup Qualifier ) – The Freak 24 April 1984
- 06 – Bordeaux, Grand Prix (Grand Prix) – The Freak 11 March 1984
- 01 – Hamburg, Germany, Hamburg Derby (Hamburg Derby) – Gladstone 3 June 1983
- 02 – World Cup Final, World Cup Final (World Cup Final) – Gladstone 24 April 1983
- 01 – Göteborg Sweden, World Cup Qualifier (World Cup Qualifier) – Gladstone 8 April 1983
- 03 – World Cup Final, World Cup Final (World Cup Final) – Gladstone 24 April 1982
- 03 – World Cup Final, World Cup Final (World Cup Final) – Gladstone 24 April 1981
- 01 – Göteborg Sweden, World Cup Qualifier (World Cup Qualifier) – Gladstone 8 April 1981
- 01 – Olympics, Individual (Individual) – Gladstone 3 August 1980
- 01 – World Cup Final, World Cup – 3rd Leg (World Cup – 3rd Leg) – Gladstone 24 April 1980
- 01 – s'Hertogenbosch, Netherlands, World Cup Qualifier (World Cup Qualifier) – Gladstone 18 March 1980
- 01 – Antwerp, World Cup Qualifier (World Cup Qualifier) – Answer 13 October 1979
- 01 – World Cup Final, World Cup – 1st Leg (World Cup – 1st Leg) – Gladstone 24 April 1979
- 01 – Göteborg Sweden, Göteborg Grand Prix (Göteborg Grand Prix) – Jasper 21 April 1979
- 01 – World Cup Final, World Cup Final (World Cup Final) – Gladstone 21 April 1979
- 01 – Dortmund Germany, World Cup Qualifier (World Cup Qualifier) – Gladstone 8 April 1979
- 01 – Amsterdam, World Cup Qualifier (World Cup Qualifier ) – Gladstone 16 December 1978
- 01 – Hamburg, Germany, Hamburg Derby (Hamburg Derby) – Jasper 3 June 1977
- 05 – Olympics, Individual (Individual) – Lavendel 22 May 1976
- 04 – Olympics, Individual (Individual) – Lavendel 22 May 1972

== See also ==
- List of athletes with the most appearances at Olympic Games
