= FEI World Cup Jumping 2015/2016 =

The 2015–16 FEI Show Jumping World Cup is an annual international competition among the upper level of show jumping horses and riders for the 2015–16 season in Western Europe. The Final was held in Göteborg, Sweden, from Wednesday 23rd – Monday 28th, March, 2016.

== Longines FEI World Cup Jumping Western European League Qualifiers ==
Date	Country	Show
October 19th, 2015	Norway	Oslo
October 25th, 2015	Finland	Helsinki
November 1st, 2015	France	Lyon
November 8th, 2015	Italy	Verona
November 22nd, 2015	Germany	Stuttgart
November 29th, 2015	Spain	Madrid
December 20th, 2015	United Kingdom	London
December 29th, 2015	Belgium	Mechelen
January 17th, 2016	Germany	Leipzig
January 31st, 2016	Switzerland	Zürich
February 6th, 2016	France	Bordeaux
FINAL: March 23rd – 28th, 2016	Sweden	Gothenburg

== Results ==
Event:	Gold:	Points	Silver:	Points	Bronze:	Points
Oslo	(France) Pénélope Leprevost; Horse: Flora de Mariposa	20	(France) Simon Delestre; Horse: Qlassic Bois Margot	17	(France) Patrice Delaveau; Horse: Lacrimoso HDC	15
Helsinki	(Switzerland) Romain Duguet; Horse: Quorida de Treho	20	(United Kingdom); Jessica Mendoza; Horse: Spirit T	17	(Germany); Daniel Deußer; Horse: Cornet d'Amour	15
Lyon	(France) Pénélope Leprevost; Horse: Flora de Mariposa	20	(Germany) Christian Ahlmann; Horse: Taloubet Z	17	(Switzerland) Romain Duguet; Horse: Quorida de Treho	15
Verona	(France) Simon Delestre; Horse: Hermes Ryan	20	(Sweden) Henrik von Eckermann; Horse: Cantinero	17	(Germany) Ludger Beerbaum; Horse: Chaman (United Kingdom) Scott Brash; Horse: Hello M'Lady	15
Stuttgart	(Germany) Christian Ahlmann; Horse: Codex One	20	(Sweden) Douglas Lindelöw; Horse: Casello	17	(Germany) Patrick Stühlmeyer; Horse: Lacan	15
Madrid	(Germany) Christian Ahlmann; Horse: Taloubet Z	20	(Colombia) Carlos Lopez; Horse: Prince De La Mare	17	(Belgium) Pieter Devos; Horse: Dream of India Greenfield	15
London	(Italy) Emanuele Gaudiano; Horse: Admara	20	(United Kingdom) Ben Maher; Horse: Diva II	17	(United Kingdom) Michael Whitaker; Horse: Viking	15
Mechelen	(Germany) Christian Ahlmann; Horse: Taloubet Z	20	(Belgium) Niels Bruynseels; Horse: Cas de Liberte	17	(Belgium) Jérôme Guery; Horse: Papillon Z	15
Leipzig	(Germany) Niklas Krieg; Horse: Carella 5	20	(Republic of Ireland) Denis Lynch; Horse: All Star 5	17	(Netherlands) Harrie Smolders; Horse: Don VHP Z	15
Zürich	(Switzerland) Pius Schwizer; Horse: PSG Future	20	(Republic of Ireland) Denis Lynch; Horse: All Star 5	17	(Australia) Edwina Tops-Alexander; Horse: Caretina de Joter	15
Bordeaux	(France) Kevin Staut; Horse: Reveur de Hurtebise HDC	20	(France) Simon Delestre; Horse: Qlassic Bois Margot	17	(Australia) Edwina Tops-Alexander; Horse: Caretina de Joter	15
FINAL: Gothenburg	(Switzerland) Steve Guerdat; Horse: Corbinian		(Netherlands) Harrie Smolders; Horse: Emerald N.O.P.		(Germany) Daniel Deusser; Horse: Cornet d’Amour	
