= Brentina =

Dressage horse

- Breed: Hanoverian
- Sire: Brentano II
- Grandsire: Bolero
- Dam: Larissa
- Maternal grandsire: Lungao
- Sex: Mare
- Foaled: May 29, 1991; Badbergen
- Died: April 22, 2021 (age 29); The Irons Farm, Santa Barbara, California
- Country: Germany
- Colour: Chestnut
- Breeder: Wilhelm Rethorst from Badbergen
- Owner: Parry and Peggy Thomas
- Rider: Debbie McDonald

Major wins
- 1999 Pan American Games, Winnipeg, Individual and Team Gold

Brentina (May 29, 1991 – April 22, 2021) was an Olympic-level dressage horse ridden by Debbie McDonald. She was owned by E. Parry Thomas.

== Breeding ==
Brentina was by Brentano II, who was Hanoverian stallion of the year in 2003 and was second at his stallion testing. He has produced several impressive offspring, such as Barclay and Barclay II, Bone Dea II, and he is the dam-sire of Poetin. Brentina is a full-sister to the stallion Barclay II.

=== Pedigree ===
Pedigree for Brentina
1991 Chestnut mare

Pedigree of Brentina
| Sire Brentano II ch. 1983 | Bolero ch. 1975 | Black Sky br. 1966 Thoroughbred | Blast |
| Sire Brentano II ch. 1983 | Bolero ch. 1975 | Black Sky br. 1966 Thoroughbred | Madrilene |
| Sire Brentano II ch. 1983 | Bolero ch. 1975 | Baronesse ch. 1970 | Bleep |
| Sire Brentano II ch. 1983 | Bolero ch. 1975 | Baronesse ch. 1970 | Atlastaube |
| Sire Brentano II ch. 1983 | Glocke br. 1973 | Grande ch. 1958 | Graf |
| Sire Brentano II ch. 1983 | Glocke br. 1973 | Grande ch. 1958 | Duellfest |
| Sire Brentano II ch. 1983 | Glocke br. 1973 | Ferbel br. 1968 | Ferdinand |
| Sire Brentano II ch. 1983 | Glocke br. 1973 | Ferbel br. 1968 | Marbel |
| Dam Lieslotte | Lungau (horse) | Lugano II ch. 1958 | Der Loewe |
| Dam Lieslotte | Lungau (horse) | Lugano II ch. 1958 | Altwunder |
| Dam Lieslotte | Lungau (horse) | Wispe br. 1966 | Weingau |
| Dam Lieslotte | Lungau (horse) | Wispe br. 1966 | Almmeise |
| Dam Lieslotte | Nora | Nomade ch. 1970 | Novum |
| Dam Lieslotte | Nora | Nomade ch. 1970 | Seegluck |
| Dam Lieslotte | Nora | Docke | |

== Dressage career ==
Medal record

Equestrian

Olympic Games
| Bronze medal – third place | 2004 Athens | Team dressage |

World Championships
| Silver medal – second place | 2002 Jerez | Team dressage |
| Bronze medal – third place | 2006 Aachen | Team dressage |

Pan American Games
| Gold medal – first place | 1999 Winnipeg | Team dressage |
| Gold medal – first place | 1999 Mar del Plata | Individual dressage |

Brentina was sold to Peggy Thomas for 150,000 Deutsch Marks at the 1994 October Elite Auction in Verden. She was originally intended as a mount for Peggy, but as a young horse, Brentina threw Mrs. Thomas off and McDonald kept her as a ride. The mare has since had incredible success at the international level in dressage, becoming one of the most successful U.S. horses in history, mainly due to her excellent work ethic and the partnership she shares with her rider.

In 2003, Brentina underwent surgery to correct a breathing problem, caused by a paralyzed windpipe, that restricted air intake to 30% of normal capacity.

After a mild tendon strain at the 2004 CDI*** in Dortmund, Germany, McDonald and the Thomas' decided not to compete the mare in the upcoming Athens Olympics selection trials. However, due to their #1 standing in the USEF Grand Prix Rankings, and after a recommendation by Klaus Balkenhol, the U.S. Dressage Team Coach, the Committee on Selections of the United States Equestrian Federation added her to the short list for the Olympic Games.

Brentina was also named to the 2006 World Equestrian Games team. She completed the team competition, finishing with a very good score and helping the Americans to a bronze medal. However, her rider felt a few tentative steps during the extended trot, and decided not to ride in the individual competition, fearing it might be a sign of injury and another ride might lead to serious injury. After a full work-up in the States, scanning the tendon, the veterinarians found diagnosed the injury as a strain, and treated it with A Cell. Brentina is expected to fully recover and return to work.

On February 10, 2009, Brentina underwent surgery for colic. McDonald reported a few days later that she was on the mend and recovering well. She remained at the veterinary facility until February 23.

Brentina was retired from competition on April 17 at the Las Vegas 2009 World Cup.

Brentina has also been made into a Breyer horse model.

== Broodmare career ==
Brentina was officially retired from competitions in 2009 to become a broodmare.

In 2010, two embryo transfer foals were born from Brentina at Pollyrich Farms in California: The black colt Dillinger, by the 2002 Hanoverian stallion Damsey FRH, a grandson of Donnerhall, a male-line descendant of Thoroughbred racehorse Robert the Devil (1877–1889) of the Darley Arabian line; and the chestnut colt Brighton, by the Dutch Warmblood stallion Kingston (1992 - 2010), a male-line descendant of the Thoroughbred stallion Furioso (1939 - 1967) of the Godolphin Arabian line. In 2011, Brentina was bred to the Dutch Warmblood stallion Totilas using frozen semen, but both embryo transfers failed to take.

As of 2014, Dillinger - a "beautiful colt with textbook conformation" - was gelded and being trained to be a dressage horse, like his dam. Brighton, who was also gelded, was sold for US$35,000 to a private buyer as a dressage horse in 2019.

== Accomplishments ==
2006

- Team Bronze at the World Equestrian Games (did not compete individually due to minor injury)

2005

- Farnam/ Platform • USEF Horse of the Year
- 3rd FEI World Cup in Las Vegas, Nevada

2004

- Team Bronze Athens Olympics
- 1st at the CDI*** Dortmund, Germany (won the Grand Prix and Grand Prix Special)
- 1st at the U.S. Freestyle Championships/U.S. League Final

2003

- World Cup Final Champion (first U.S. pair to do so)
- 2nd Team/3rd Individually, Nations Cup at CDIO Aachen

2002

- 2002 USET Dressage Grand Prix Championship
- Team Silver/Individually 4th at the World Equestrian Games in Jerez, Spain
- 1st U.S. Freestyle Championships/U.S. League Final (best placing for the US Team or any US rider in years)
- 1st USET Grand Prix Championship/World Equestrian Games Selection Trials at the Festival of Champions.

2001

- USET Grand Prix Champions

1999

- Team and Individual Gold Medal winners at the Pan American Games
