= Furioso (British horse) =

British-bred Thoroughbred racehorse

- Breed: Thoroughbred
- Discipline: Show jumping
- Sire: Precipitation
- Grandsire: Hurry On
- Dam: Maureen
- Maternal grandsire: Son-in-law
- Sex: Stallion
- Foaled: 1939
- Country: United Kingdom
- Color: Bay
- Owner: French National Stud

Record
- 21 starts, 0 wins
- Last updated on: 28 August 2023.

Furioso (1939–1968) was an influential sire of sport horses, and is found in the pedigrees of many top show jumpers today.

== Life ==
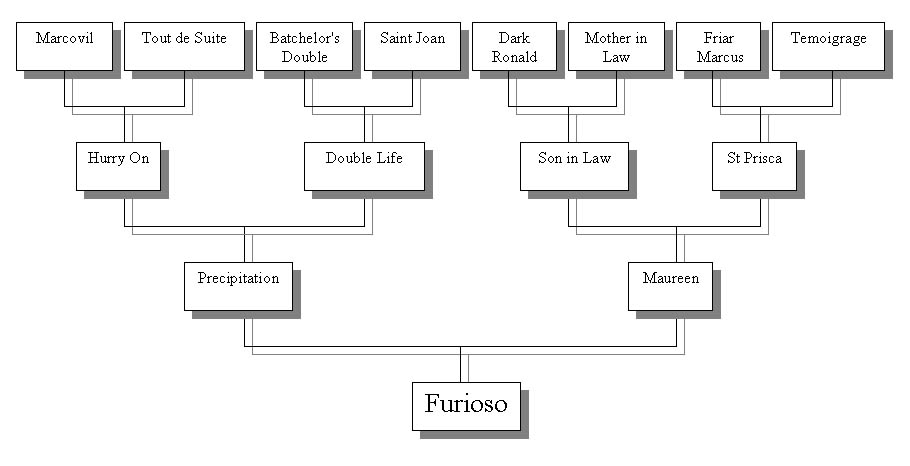
Furioso's lineage, including the horses Precipitation, Son-in-Law, Double Life, and Dark Ronald

After World War II, he was purchased by the French National Stud, where he was used as a breeding stallion until his death in 1968.

== Pedigree ==
Furioso was sired by the English Thoroughbred stallion Precipitation (1933 – 1957), an influential sire who is found in the pedigrees of many racehorses and sport horses today. He was responsible for helping maintain the Matchem (1748 – 1781) and Godolphin Arabian sireline.

His dam, the Thoroughbred mare Maureen (b. 1931), was sired by Son-in-law, by Dark Ronald (1905 – 1928), a grandson of the Thoroughbred racehorse Hampton (1872 – 1897), by Lord Clifden (1860 – 1875). Dark Ronald was also an influential sire of sport horses and warmbloods, particularly show jumpers.

== Descendants ==
- Big Ben
- Cor de la Bryère
- Furioso II

== Sire line tree ==
- Furioso
  - Lutteur B
  - Lurioso
  - Mexico
    - Le Mexico
      - Silvano
      - Ulft
      - Zelhem
      - Zonneglans
      - Astronaut
      - Expert
    - Laeken
    - Jexico du Parc
  - Furioso II
    - Purioso
    - Heisman
    - Voltaire
      - Concorde
      - Flying Electro
      - Farmer
      - Forever
      - Mexcalero
      - Play It Again
      - Altair
      - Kannon
      - Kingston
      - Now or Never M
      - Popeye K
    - For Pleasure
  - Brilloso
    - Livarot
      - Souviens Toi III

== See also ==
- Precipitation (horse)
- Haras national du Pin
