= Quorida de Treho =

French show jumping mare

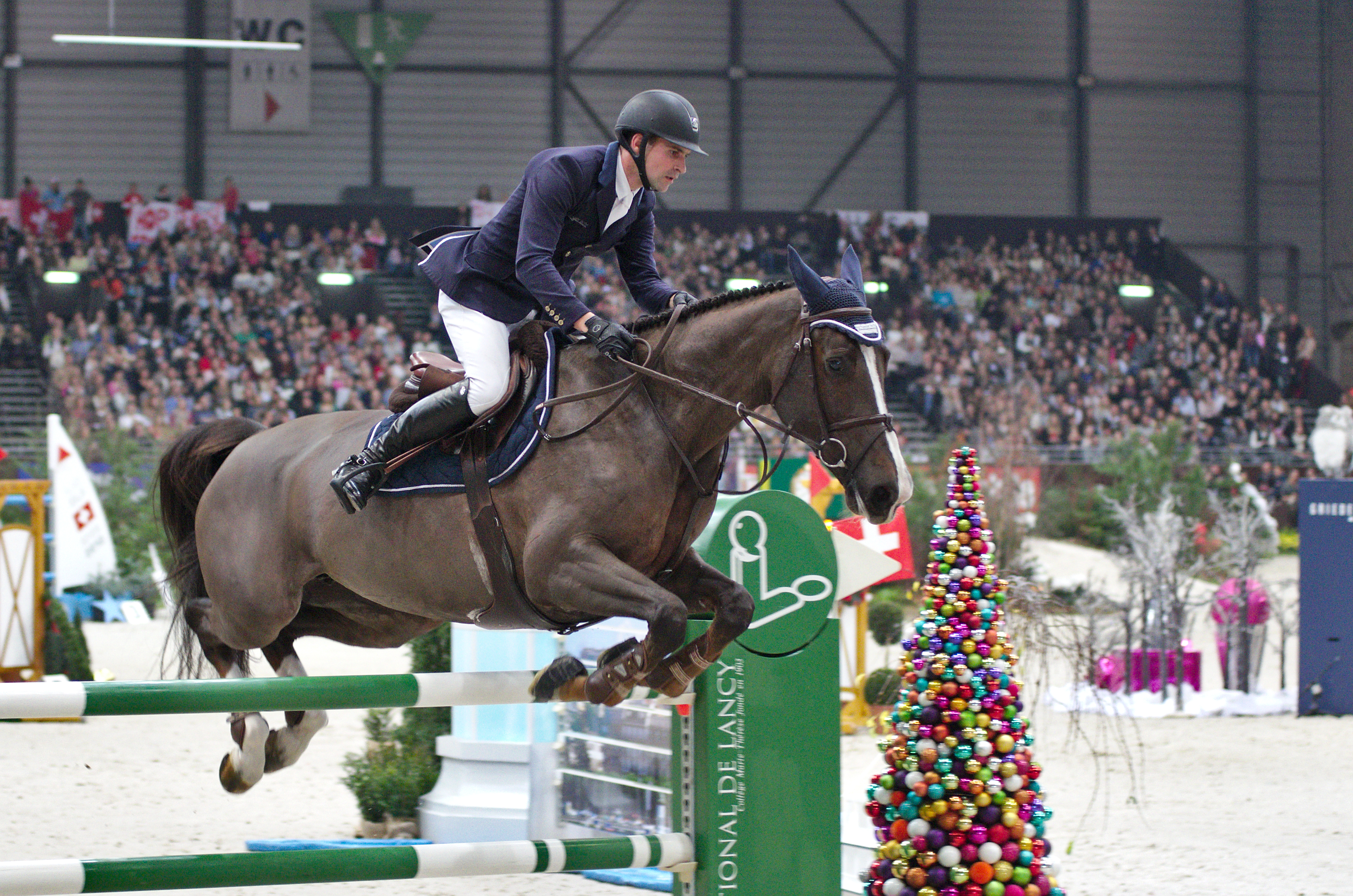
- Romain Duguet and Quorida de Treho at the CHI de Genève in 2013.
- Breed: Selle Français
- Sire: Kannan
- Dam: Dalais
- Sex: Female
- Foaled: Élevage de Treho
- Color: Chestnut
- Owner: Christiana Duguet

Quorida de Treho (born April 29, 2004) is a chestnut mare, registered in the Selle Français genealogical register, daughter of Kannan and Dalais, by Tolbiac des Forêts. Born at Cruguel in Morbihan (Brittany), she was trained as a show jumper, successfully completing the classical show jumping cycle. Subsequently ridden by Franco-Swiss rider Romain Duguet, the pair reached the level of international competitions, winning the Saut Hermès jump, the CSIO in St. Gallen and the bronze medal at the European Show Jumping Championships in 2015, as well as the Helsinki World Cup stage twice, in 2015 and 2016. Quorida is voted Horse of the Year 2015 in Switzerland by the German-speaking readers of PferdeWoche.

Injured twice, she is retired from sport in September 2018, at the age of 14. Her first three foals are born in May 2020.

== History ==
=== Early years ===
Quorida de Treho was born on April 29, 2004 at Dominique Mauny's stud in Cruguel, Morbihan, Brittany. Her birth was the result of a collaboration with breeder Olivier Le Viot, from Cesson-Sévigné. Broken in at 3, she was ridden by Dominique Mauny, who was also one of her co-breeders, from the age of 4 until she was 6. In 2011, the year of her 7th birthday, she was ridden by Guillaume Batillat, with whom she finished 3rd in the Critérium de Fontainebleau.

=== Years of competition under the Swiss flag with Romain Duguet ===
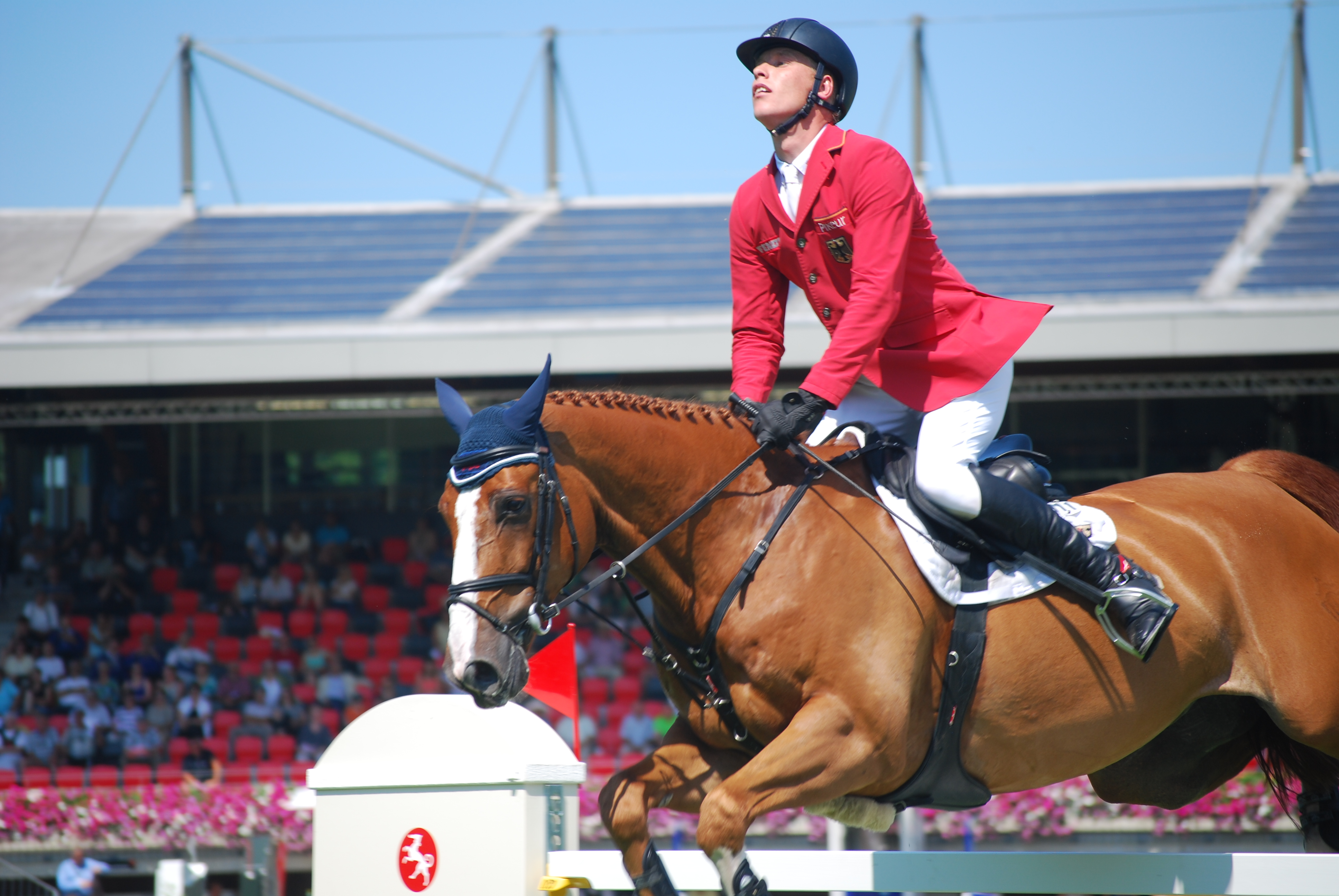
Romain Duguet and Quorida de Treho at the CSIO St. Gallen 2015.

Quorida entered her first 5-star international jumping competitions (CSI5*) in 2013, representing the Swiss team under the saddle of Romain Duguet. Owned by Christiana Duguet, she was trained by Thomas Fuchs for 4 years. The mare is housed at the Gümligen stables near Bern.

Winner of the Saut Hermès, the Official International Jumping Competition in St. Gallen, and team bronze medal at the 2015 European Championships in Aachen, she was voted Horse of the Year 2015 in Switzerland by the German-speaking readers of the PferdeWoche newspaper. She gives naturalized French-Swiss rider Romain Duguet access to the highest level of competition, her victory in the Hermes jump-off also representing Duguet's first-ever win in a CSI5*. She won the Helsinki World Cup leg in 2015 and 2016. She takes part in the Gothenburg World Cup in 2016.

Romain Duguet preserves her in early 2016, with a view to her participation in the Olympic Games. She is rested for two months, before slowly returning to competition with the CSI2* at Le Mans in early March 2016. In June 2016, at the CSIO in St. Gallen, the mare commits a fault, but nevertheless achieves the best performance of the day for the Swiss team, finishing in 6th place. Selected for the Rio Olympics, she competed in the individual final, finishing 32nd.

=== Injuries and retirement ===
Quorida's last appearance on a CSI5* was in Basel, in January 2017. The mare was slightly injured and therefore did not take part in the Zurich CSI. She underwent fetlock surgery and remained in convalescence for a year, returning to trotting in November 2017, with a return to competition announced for early 2018. She re-injured herself in April 2018.

She was retired on September 4, 2018, at the age of 14, when she was Duguet's leading mare. She is taken over by Jean-Michel Gaspard, at Rosières-aux-Salines. In 2019, after a year's retirement, her stablemate is a black Shetland pony.

== Awards ==
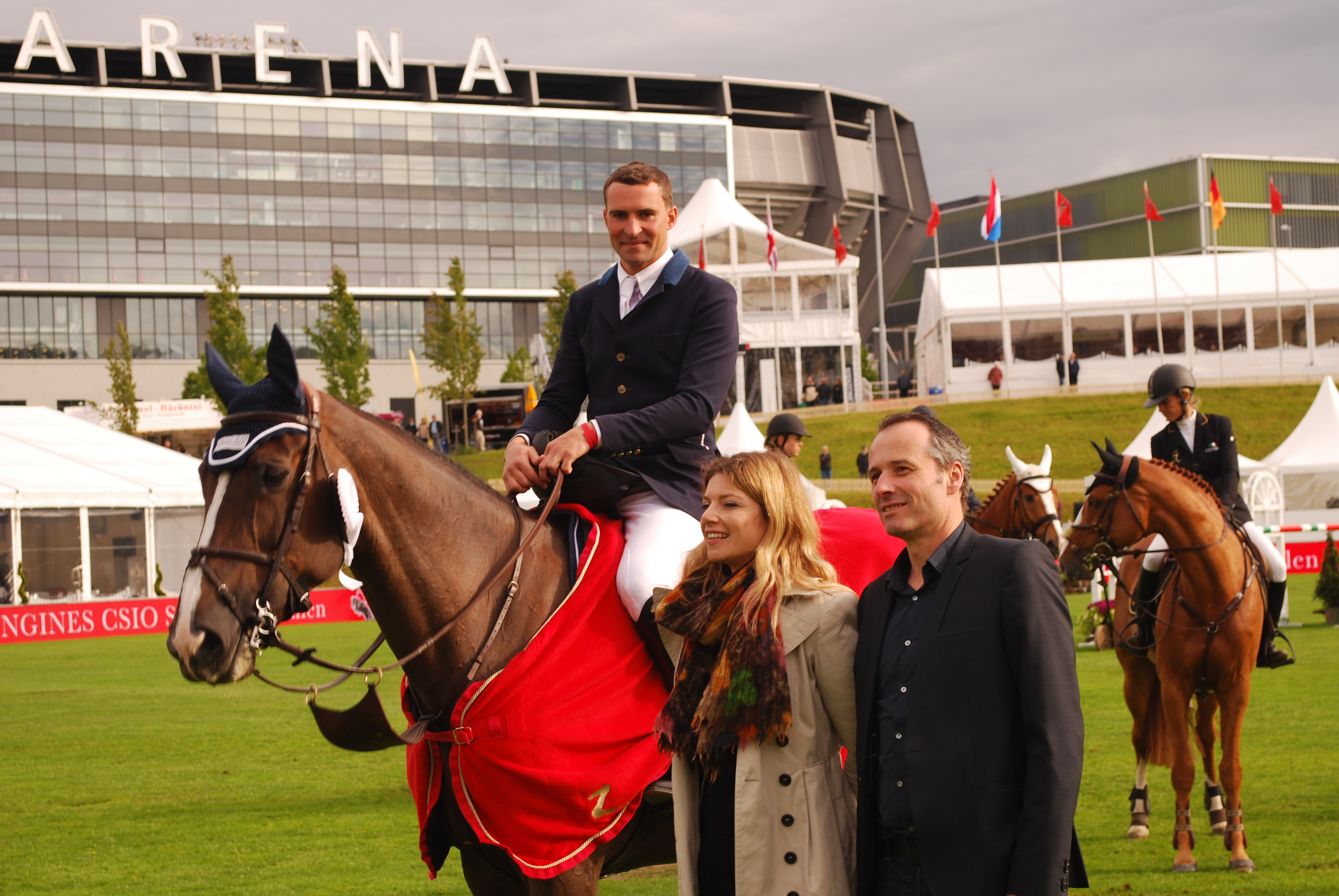
Quorida de Treho ridden by Romain Duguet at the St. Gallen CSIO in 2013.

=== 2015 ===
Quorida ranks 20th in the WBFSH World Jumping Horse Rankings, compiled in October 2015. She is also voted Horse of the Year 2015 in Switzerland by readers of the German-language magazine PferdeWoche.

- April 12, 2015: winner of the Grand Prix 5* du Saut Hermès, after a double clear round in 38 s 99.
- June 2015: winner of the Grand Prix at the CSIO St. Gallen.
- Team bronze medal at the 2015 European Show Jumping Championships in Aachen.
- October 2015: winner of the Grand Prix at the 2015-2016 Show Jumping World Cup in Helsinki.

=== 2016 ===
She ranks 70th in the world jumping horse rankings, drawn up in October 2016.

- March: 16th at the FEI World Cup Final in Gothenburg.
- August: 32nd individual and 6th team at the Rio Olympic Games.
- October: winner of the World Cup Grand Prix in Helsinki, after a 14-competitor jump-off.

=== 2017 ===
- January: 24th at the CSI5* in Basel.

== Description ==
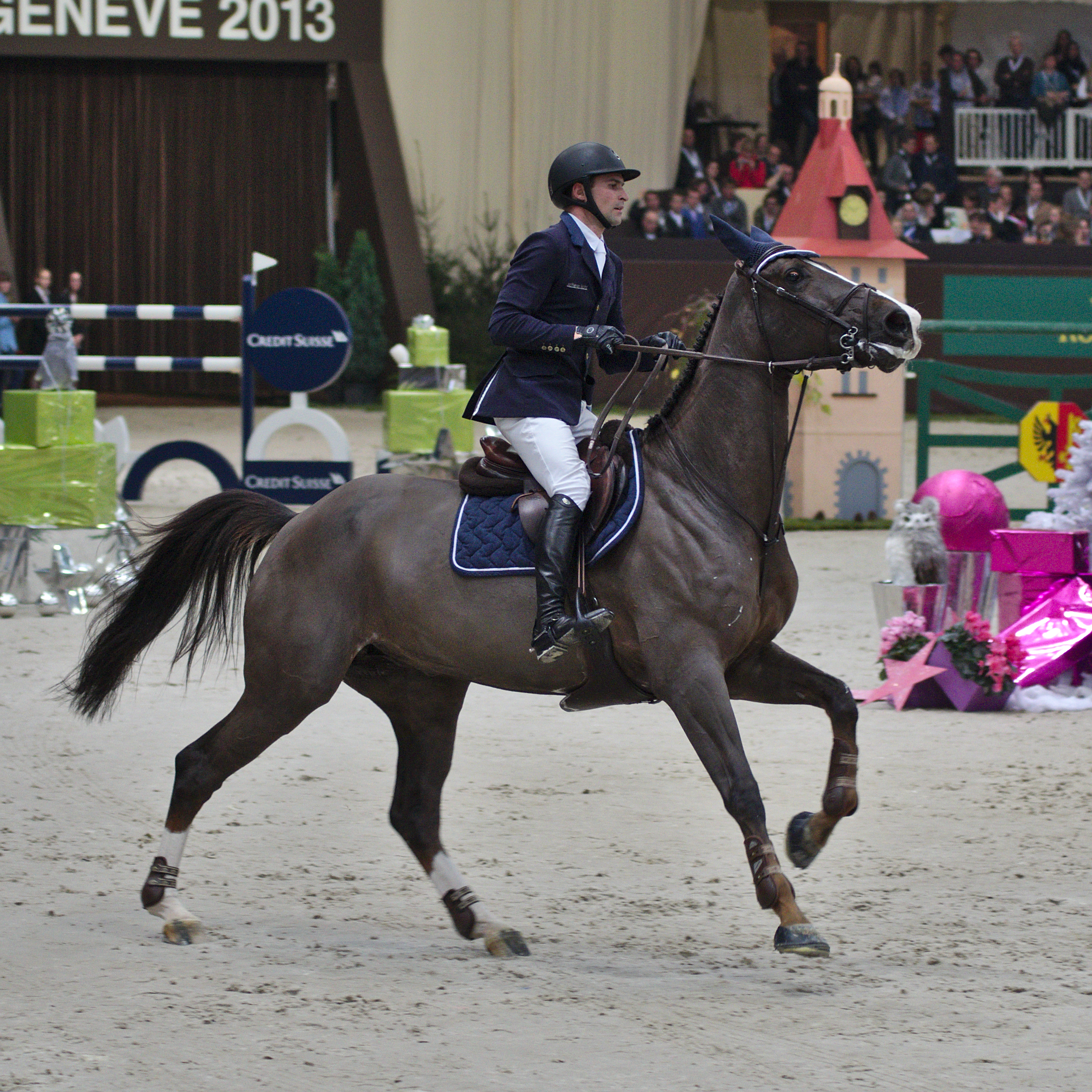
Quorida de Treho ridden by Romain Duguet at the 2013 CHI de Genève.

Quorida de Treho is a burnt chestnut mare registered with the Selle Français studbook. She is nicknamed "Coco". Le Temps journalist Julie Conti described her as "tall" and "powerful", in 2017.

Her rider Romain Duguet considers her one of the best horses in the world, describing her as charismatic and engaging. He describes her as stiff over jumps, but with a lot of blood and energy. She is described as respectful of the bars, energetic and gifted with good strength. She is also a fairly solitary mare, who tends to keep to herself in the corner of her stall.

== Origins ==
Quorida de Treho is a daughter of the stallion Kannan. Her dam, Dalais, is a daughter of Tolbiac des Forêts. This mare, born in Quiberon to Hélène Marie, was acquired by the de Treho breeding operation in 2000. Quorida's successes have made the de Treho stud very popular. Quorida is 37.59 % Thoroughbred.

Pedigree of Quorida de Treho (2004)
| Sire Kannan (1992-2020) | Voltaire (1979-2004) | Furioso II (1965-1986) | Furioso (1939-1967) |
| Sire Kannan (1992-2020) | Voltaire (1979-2004) | Furioso II (1965-1986) | Dame de Ranville (1947) |
| Sire Kannan (1992-2020) | Voltaire (1979-2004) | Gogo Moeve (1975) | Gotthard (1949) |
| Sire Kannan (1992-2020) | Voltaire (1979-2004) | Gogo Moeve (1975) | Mosaik (1966) |
| Sire Kannan (1992-2020) | Cemeta (1984) | Nimmerdor (1972-2003) | Farn (1959) |
| Sire Kannan (1992-2020) | Cemeta (1984) | Nimmerdor (1972-2003) | Ramonaa (1963) |
| Sire Kannan (1992-2020) | Cemeta (1984) | Wozieta (1980) | Le Mexico (1970) |
| Sire Kannan (1992-2020) | Cemeta (1984) | Wozieta (1980) | Rozieta (1975) |
| Dam Dalais (1991-2017) | Tolbiac des Forêts (1985-1997) | Muguet du Manoir (1978-2000) | Artichaut (1966) |
| Dam Dalais (1991-2017) | Tolbiac des Forêts (1985-1997) | Muguet du Manoir (1978-2000) | Caméra (1968) |
| Dam Dalais (1991-2017) | Tolbiac des Forêts (1985-1997) | May Flower III (1978) | Uriel (1964-1988) |
| Dam Dalais (1991-2017) | Tolbiac des Forêts (1985-1997) | May Flower III (1978) | Danaïde (1969) |
| Dam Dalais (1991-2017) | Nemesia II (1979) | Double Espoir (1969-1994) | Ibrahim (1952-1973) |
| Dam Dalais (1991-2017) | Nemesia II (1979) | Double Espoir (1969-1994) | Quatrième Espoir (1960) |
| Dam Dalais (1991-2017) | Nemesia II (1979) | Entye (1970) | Nykio (1957) |
| Dam Dalais (1991-2017) | Nemesia II (1979) | Entye (1970) | Tessa (1956) |

== Descent ==
Quorida's first foal, a filly, was born in May 2020 after an embryo transfer to a surrogate mother. The filly's sire is the stallion Contendro. Three foals by Quorida and Contendro are registered as born in 2020: the filly Kissme Coco, and two bay males, Koeur de Coco and Kosmic Coco.

== See also ==
- Selle Français
- Show jumping
- Romain Duguet

== Bibliography ==
- Abautret, Olivier (2016). Quorida arbore les Hermines à Rio (in French). Ouest-France. ISSN 0999-2138.
- Poudret, Alban (2018). Quorida de Treho à la retraite en Lorraine (in French). Le Cavalier Romand.
- Tracol, Lucas (2018). Quorida de Treho à la retraite (in French). Grand Prix magazine. Archived from the original on 21 September 2018.
