= Furioso II =

Sport horse

- Breed: Selle Français
- Sire: Furioso (Thoroughbred)
- Grandsire: Precipitation (Thoroughbred)
- Dam: Dame de Renville (Selle Français)
- Maternal grandsire: Talisman (Selle Français)
- Sex: Stallion
- Foaled: 1965
- Country: Germany
- Colour: Liver Chestnut, blaze, stocking on both rear and left fore
- Breeder: H. Lemoine Escajeul, Frankreich

Furioso II (1965–1986) was a sire in the breeding of sport horses. His offspring have performed well in all disciplines of show jumping, including at the Barcelona and Sydney Olympics.

== History ==
Furioso's lineage including the horses Precipitation, Son-in-Law, Double Life and Dark Ronald

Furioso II was imported in 1968 to Germany by George Vorwerk, a breeder of Oldenburg horses. His dam, Dame de Renville, produced several great horses, including Mexico, Laeken, Jexico de Parc and Heur de Bratand. He stood 16.1 hands (65 inches, 165 cm).

The stallion was approved for the Oldenburg stud book in 1967, and won his 100-day test performed in 1968 at Westercelle. He was incredibly influential to the Oldenburg breed, which used his Thoroughbred bloodlines through his sire to introduce a more modern type of sport horse without resorting to a pure Thoroughbred. Known as the "Stamp Stallion", because his offspring inherited his 'very good feet and legs, his outstanding neck and shoulder, striking dappled chocolate chestnut coat with flaxen tail and white markings', Furioso II was later approved for the Hanoverian, Rhineland, and Westphalian studbooks.

Based on money earned by offspring, Furioso II was the top producing stallion in Germany from 1979 to 1989. In 1990 he was the top producer of dressage horses. During his lifetime, the stallion produced over 200 state premium mares and at least 70 approved sons, including:

- Mexico: sire of 20 approved sons, 20 dams of stallions, and numerous show jumping horses
- FBI: show jumper
- Heisman: finished fourth at the Barcelona Olympic in show jumping, was Horse of the Year in the United States
- For Pleasure: won show jumping team gold at both the Atlanta and Sydney Olympics, has sired 8 licensed Hanoverian stallions to date, was German Horse of the Year in 1995 and 1996
- Voltaire: show jumping sire of 33 approved sons, including Finesse and Altaire
- Cocktail: Grand Prix dressage horse ridden by Anky van Grunsven, sire of Jazz
- He is also seen in the lines, through his grandson Welt As, of Bonfire and STC Diamond

Furioso II died in 1986, due to colic.

== Sire line tree ==
- Furioso II
  - Purioso
  - Heisman
  - Voltaire
    - Concorde
    - Flying Electro
    - Farmer
    - Forever
    - Mexcalero
    - Play It Again
    - Altair
    - Kannon
    - Kingston
    - Now or Never M
    - Popeye K
  - For Pleasure

== See also ==
- Precipitation (horse)
- Furioso
- Cor de la Bryere
- Popeye K
- Royal Kaliber
- Valegro
