= Flora de Mariposa =

Belgian show jumping mare

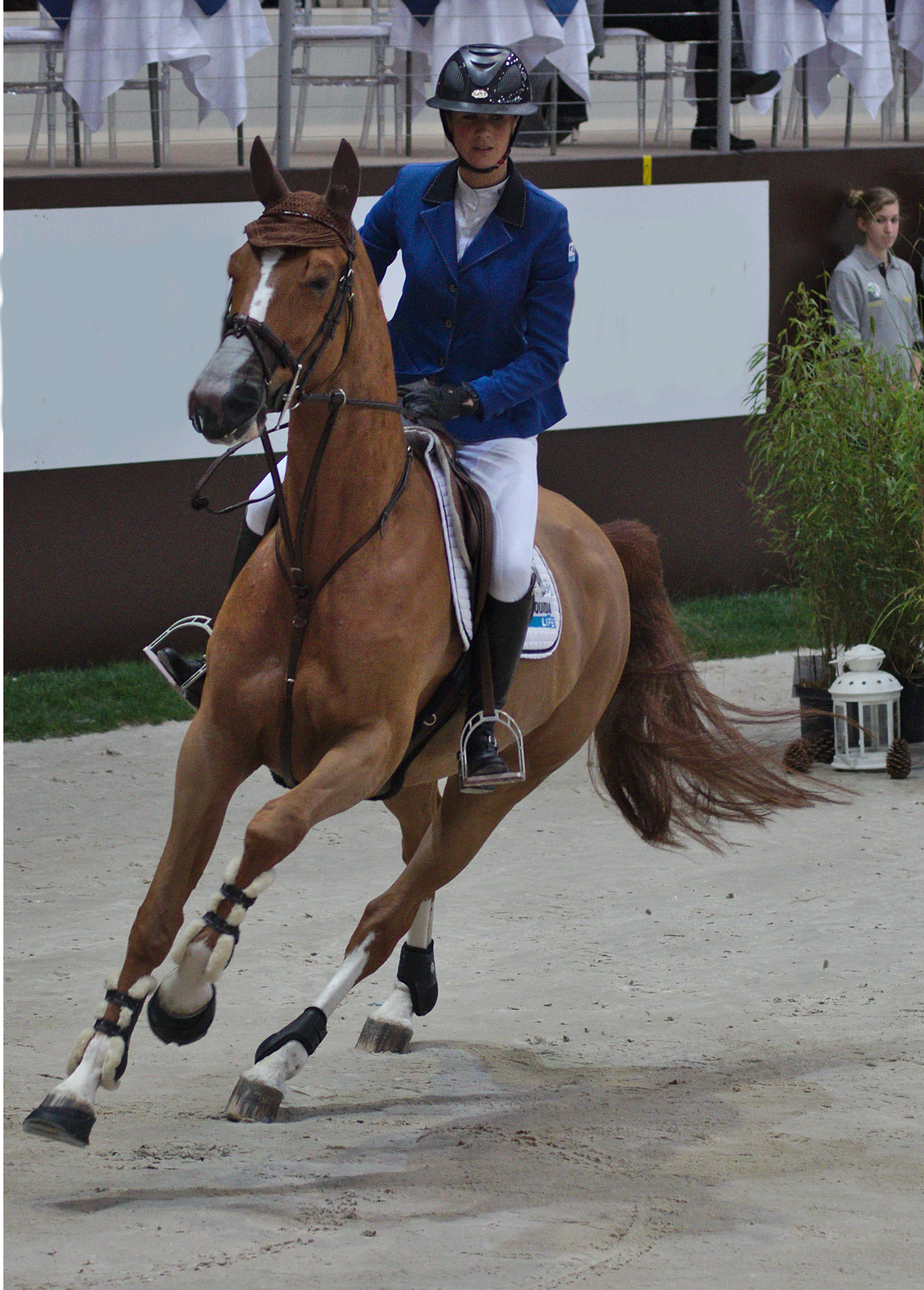
- Breed: Belgian Warmblood
- Sire: For Pleasure
- Dam: Adeline
- Sex: Female
- Died: 30 July 2020

Flora de Mariposa was a chestnut show-jumping mare registered in the Belgian Warmblood studbook, born on April 26, 2005 in Belgium at the Herman de Brabander stud. She achieved excellent results in her early years, from age 4 to 7, under the saddle of Belgian rider Kurt De Clercq. French rider Geneviève Mégret, owner of the Clarbec stud farm in the Pays d'Auge region, acquired her at the end of 2012 and entrusted her to Rouen rider Pénélope Leprévost, who took her to the highest level. Flora de Mariposa was the French revelation of 2014, despite her young age, thanks to her performances during the World Equestrian Games. In 2015, she won two Grand Prix and had the best season of any French show jumping horse, earning her the title of "Horse of the Year". Selected for the 2016 Rio Olympics, she won a team gold medal. Injured in 2017, she fell to another rider, Félicie Bertrand, at the end of 2018. She died of endotoxemia at the age of 15 on July 30, 2020.

A daughter of For Pleasure, Flora de Mariposa inherited his jumping style, with a high head carriage and grouped hind legs. Respectful and reputedly gentle, she nevertheless has a sensitive and sometimes difficult character, requiring her to be channeled in competition. Pénélope Leprevost, seduced by her mount's sporting qualities, was also entrusted with Ilena de Mariposa, one of Flora's daughters.

== History ==
Flora de Mariposa was born on April 26, 2005 at the stud of Flemish Belgian Herman de Brabander, who quickly recognized that his filly had exceptional sporting qualities, although she often had a bad temper.

During her early years, she was ridden by Belgian Kurt De Clercq. Koen de Brabander, Herman's son, realized that he might have a crack when the mare reached 4 years of age: Flora de Mariposa was revealed early on when she was crowned Elite at the Belgian Championship for 4-year-olds in 2009. She finished ninth in the 5-year-old cycle due to a missed jump-off, then third in the 6-year-old cycle, despite a fault in the final. That same year, she reached the final of the World Young Horse Championships in Lanaken. At age 6, she is sold to the Lenssens stables, still in Belgium, where Tom Camerlijnck trains her for a year.

=== Purchase by Clarbec stud and debut with Pénélope Leprevost ===
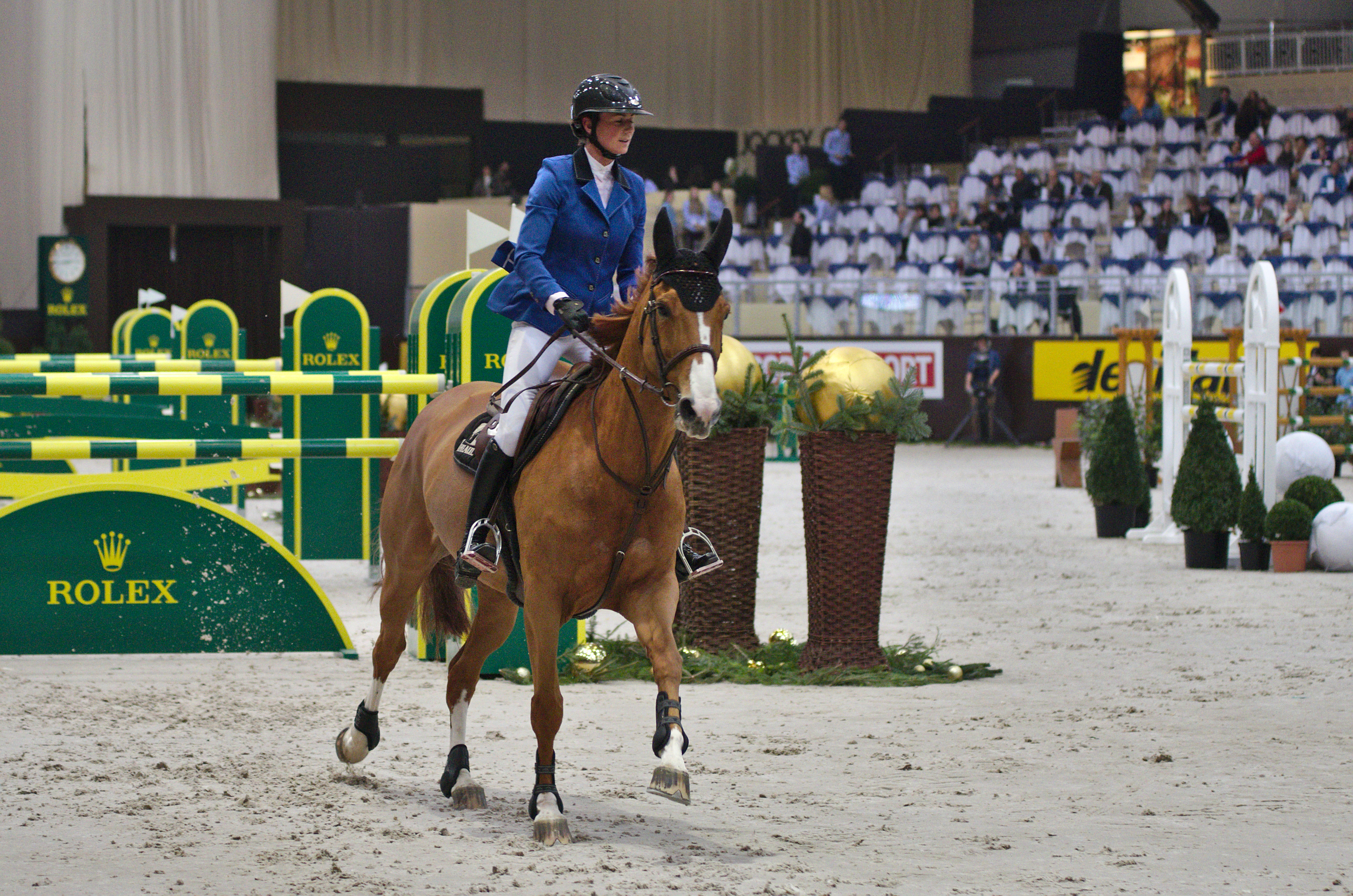
Pénélope Leprevost and Flora de Mariposa at the 53rd CHI de Genève, 2013.

It was in 2012 that French rider Pénélope Leprevost spotted Flora de Mariposa's qualities, which she felt were ahead of the competition. Her patron Geneviève Mégret acquired the mare from the Lenssens brothers in December, when Flora was just 7 years old, after seeing her jump. Both she and her husband were convinced of her qualities. The new couple start competing internationally in 2013. Flora de Mariposa is stationed at Haras de Clarbec, a competition stable in the Pays d'Auge region, owned by Geneviève Mégret.

=== Season 2014 ===
According to Grand Prix magazine, which devoted a portrait to her in December and described her as "gifted", the mare was the French revelation of 2014. According to Eurosport, she started the season "on a high", with a victory in a 1.50 m event and a second at 1.45 m in Leipzig in January. Progress was meteoric, particularly in June, when Flora and Pénélope won a Nations Cup event in Rotterdam. This convinced Philippe Guerdat, coach of the French show jumping team. Flora de Mariposa was considered too young and inexperienced for the 2014 World Equestrian Games in Caen, but the injury to Dame Blanche, the mare selected for the event with Pénélope Leprevost, leads to her successful selection. Flora de Mariposa takes part in the silver medal won by the French team in Normandy, despite a fault on the penultimate obstacle of the course during the team trials and an impressive fall on the river during the individual qualifications, which results in the couple's elimination. Despite this fall, Flora remains intact both physically and mentally. She is rested for two months to recuperate, before working again on river crossing.

Flora's performances in 2014 lead to purchase offers from international horse dealers and riders, including Nick Skelton and Scott Brash, all of which are declined by the Clarbec stud. In December, the pair win the gender war at the Guccis Masters, a show jumping event that pits riders against riders, with Pénélope Leprevost the best rider in the women's team. In December 2014, Flora ranks 21st in the WBFSH's ranking of the best show jumping horses.

=== Season 2015 ===
Flora de Mariposa had an excellent season in 2015. However, the rider withdrew due to an injury to her mount at La Baule in May, caused by a small bone contusion in the left front foot following a shock. This cast doubt on their participation in the European Championships in August. Flora de Mariposa slowly began trotting again in June. After two months' rest, she made her comeback at the CSI2* (two-star international jumping competition) in Dettighofen, Germany. She took second place at the CSIO (official international jumping competition) in Hickstead in August. In top form for the European Show Jumping Championships in Aachen two weeks later, Flora de Mariposa makes a fault on the palanque in the team competition, which results in a fifth-place finish for France in the team competition. However, she finished the individual classes in fourth place. Voted Horse of the Year 2015 by L'Éperon magazine, Flora de Mariposa receives her award at the Paris Horse Show in December.

=== Season 2016 ===
In April 2016, she won the Antwerp leg of the Global Champions Tour ahead of another French rider, Simon Delestre, thanks to a triple clear round. In June, Flora and her rider fell on an oxer during the jump-off at the CSIO5* (5-star international Olympic jumping competition) in Rotterdam. Extensive veterinary examinations reveal no injuries or health problems, allowing Flora de Mariposa to remain in contention for the 2016 Summer Olympics. The pair will compete at the Rio Olympics, with the mare arriving on South American soil on the night of Sunday August 7. Representing a reasonable medal chance for France, she suffered a bout of colic on the evening of Friday August 12, but recovered the following day. During qualifying, the mare and her rider fell on an oxer, eliminating Pénélope Leprevost and Flora de Mariposa from the individual classes. The mare and her rider nevertheless took part in France's team gold medal.

=== Seasons 2017 to 2019 ===
She is injured at the end of July 2017, and resumes competition in October 2018 with a new rider, Félicie Bertrand. She re-injured herself at the end of December 2018 in Liverpool, then was treated in a veterinary clinic in that city, and returned to her owners at Clarbec stud in April 2019. She died of endotoxemia on July 30, 2020.

== Description ==
Flora de Mariposa jumping technique.

Flora de Mariposa was a chestnut mare measuring 1.67 m or 1.68 m, who appeared to be rather "short". Her morphology was very athletic and she had great power in the hindquarters. She was described as a respectful, light and fast mare, with a strong personality and sensitivity. Reputedly gentle, she can nevertheless show her hindquarters to her rider or handlers, which means she had to be tied up before she could be cared for. She was more complicated to manage at home than at shows. She could become frightened when a bird takes off, and was hypersensitive to the elements, such as rain and wind. She sometimes refused to walk in water. She also hated having her mane plaited, shaking her head before competitions, which had led her rider Pénélope Leprevost to speak of a "bloody girl's character", and to declare that without her sporting achievements, she would not keep Flora de Mariposa because of this character. Nonetheless, Pénélope Leprevost felt that Flora de Mariposa was her "mare of a lifetime", and perhaps "her Jappeloup". She also described an "osmosis" between the mare and herself, testifying that the work done with Flora's owners was bearing fruit.

Her owner Geneviève Mégret refers to her as a "show jumping genius", a mare with exceptional steering ability who seems to jump effortlessly. She's also very lively and reactive, sometimes to the point of showing too much energy and needing to be channeled. Her jumping technique seems to be inherited from her sire For Pleasure, with a high head carriage and grouped hindlegs.

At work, Flora de Mariposa was relatively dissipated in her early years, but she had a great capacity for learning. Pénélope Leprevost took several months to obtain more roundness, and appreciates her mare's suppleness. According to her rider, Flora de Mariposa went outside regularly and enjoyed lunging with an ethological halter. Because of her sensitivity to the climate, Flora was worked according to the weather, in particular to avoid working in the arena and outdoors on windy days. Penelope generally jumped her mare two days before each competition, on small set-up bars and insisting on the management of turns and half-turns.

== Awards ==
=== 2013 ===
- November: Second in the Prix de la ville de Saint-Lô (CSI2*).
- December: Third in the World Cup Grand Prix (CSI5*W) in London.

=== 2014 ===
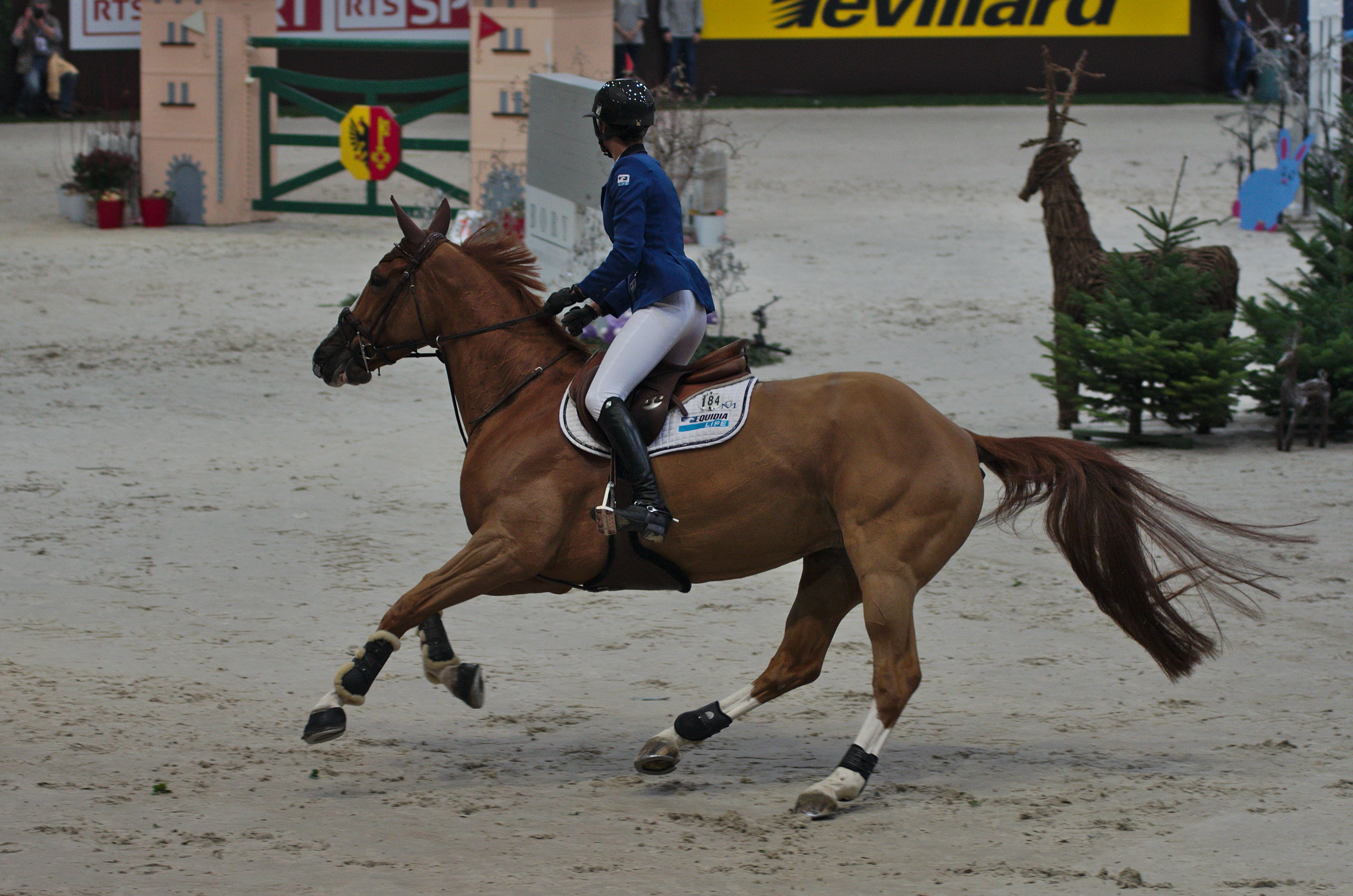
Flora de Mariposa ridden by Pénélope Leprévost at the 54th CHI de Genève in 2014.

She was 21st in the WBFSH world ranking of show jumping horses in October 2014.

- March: Second in the CSI5* (5-star international jumping competition) at the Saut Hermès in Paris.
- Winner of the 1.50 m event on the Leipzig World Cup circuit.
- August: Clear round of the CSIO4* in Gijón.
- August: Team silver medal at the 2014 World Equestrian Games in Caen, Normandy, 29th individual.
- December: Winner of the "war of the sexes" at the Guccis Masters.

=== 2015 ===
Thanks to her performances during the season, Flora de Mariposa was voted Horse of the Year 2015 in France. She is 37th in the WBFSH World Jumping Horse Rankings, established in October 2015.

- January: Winner of the Longines Grand Prix at the CSI-W in Zurich. Fourth in the Grand Prix CSI5*W.
- February: Sixth in the Grand Prix at the Bordeaux international jumping competition.
- July: Ninth in the CSI2* Dettighofen Grand Prix.
- August: Second in the CSIO Hickstead Grand Prix. Winner of the European show jumping championship hunt in Aachen, fourth individually.
- October: Winner of the World Cup stage in Oslo.
- November: Winner of the CSI-5*W at Equita'Lyon.

=== 2016 ===
- April: Winner of the Antwerp leg of the Global Champions Tour.
- May: Second at CSIO La Baule.
- June: Seventh at the CSI5* in Saint-Tropez.
- September: Olympic team champion with Roger-Yves Bost, Kevin Staut and Philippe Rozier.
- October: Eleventh in the CSI 3-star in Lyon.
- November: Eighth in the CSI 5* W in Verona (ITA)

Winner of the CSI 5* W in Verona (ITA)

- December: Sixth in the CSI 5* in Geneva

=== 2017 ===
- March
- April

== Origins ==
Flora de Mariposa is registered with the Belgian Warmblood studbook, and has an attractive pedigree. Breeder Herman de Brabander chose the stallion For Pleasure as a cross because of his character and the proof of quality he has provided over time. For Pleasure is a very popular stallion, whose production is sought after worldwide. On the maternal side, Trezebees and Cantinero have also proven their qualities, with 1.60 m buckled runs.

Pedigree of Flora de Mariposa (2005)
Sire For Pleasure (1986–2011)	Furioso II (1965–1986)	Furioso (1939–1967)	Precipitation (1933–1957)
Sire For Pleasure (1986–2011)	Furioso II (1965–1986)	Furioso (1939–1967)	Maureen (1931)
Sire For Pleasure (1986–2011)	Furioso II (1965–1986)	Dame de Ranville (1947)	Talisman (1941)
Sire For Pleasure (1986–2011)	Furioso II (1965–1986)	Dame de Ranville (1947)	Que je suis belle (1943)
Sire For Pleasure (1986–2011)	Gigantin (1980)	Grannus (1972–1993)	Graphit (1964)
Sire For Pleasure (1986–2011)	Gigantin (1980)	Grannus (1972–1993)	Odessa (1967)
Sire For Pleasure (1986–2011)	Gigantin (1980)	Goldi (1976)	Goya (1971–1975)
Sire For Pleasure (1986–2011)	Gigantin (1980)	Goldi (1976)	No info
Dam Adeline (2000)	Power Light (1988)	No info	No info
Dam Adeline (2000)	Power Light (1988)	No info	No info
Dam Adeline (2000)	Power Light (1988)	No info	No info
Dam Adeline (2000)	Power Light (1988)	No info	No info
Dam Adeline (2000)	Quirinal (1993)	Quito de Baussy (1982–2015)	Jalisco B (1975–1994)
Dam Adeline (2000)	Quirinal (1993)	Quito de Baussy (1982–2015)	No info
Dam Adeline (2000)	Quirinal (1993)	Londy (1988)	Primo des Bruyères (1981)
Dam Adeline (2000)	Quirinal (1993)	Londy (1988)	No info

In addition, Mariposa's breeding operation has already been noted for the quality of its horses: Matisse de Mariposa, out of a dam who is half-sister to Flora and Diamant de Semilly, was voted second best Belgian Warmblood stallion candidate at the 2015 approval. Hermes de Mariposa, Flora's uterine brother, won Belgian Warmblood studbook approval.

== Descendants ==
Flora de Mariposa has two offspring. In 2007, aged just two, she was inseminated by the stallion Berlin (Caspar) and carried a filly, Ilena de Mariposa, to term and natural birth in 2008. She was inseminated by Nabab de Rêve in 2011, and this time gave birth to a foal, Margriet de Mariposa, who was born by embryo transfer to another mare, so as not to compromise her sporting career.

In November 2015, Pénélope Leprevost welcomed Ilena de Mariposa, who joined the rider's piquet of young horses, also being stationed at Clarbec stud. In the future, her owners plan to breed Flora with their stallion Vagabond de la Pomme, but they give priority to her sporting career.

== See also ==
- Pénélope Leprevost
- Belgian Warmblood

== Bibliography ==
- Fournier, Éric (2015). Flora de Mariposa, l'éclosion d'une surdouée (in French). L'Éperon. ISSN 1253-7810.
- Golla, Mathilde (2016). Flora de Mariposa, la championne de Pénélope (in French). Cheval Magazine. ISSN 0245-3614.
- Lavenu, Solène (2015). Flora de Mariposa, cheval de l'année 2015 ! (in French). L'Éperon. ISSN 1253-7810.
- Trevisan, Liliane (2015). On en a parlé à Flora (in French). L'Équipe.
- Verrier, Marc (2014). Flora de Mariposa, révélation de l'année (in French). Grand Prix magazine.
