= Brentano II =

- Breed: Hanoverian
- Sire: Bolero (Hanoverian)
- Grandsire: Black Sky (Thoroughbred)
- Dam: Glocke (Hanoverian)
- Maternal grandsire: Grande (Hanoverian)
- Sex: 16.1¾ hh Stallion
- Foaled: 1982
- Country: Germany
- Colour: Chestnut
- Breeder: Dr. Max Schulz-Stellenfleth

Brentano II is an influential stallion who has sired several dressage horses. His offspring include the Olympic medalist Brentina, and now-deceased Poetin.

== Breeding ==
Brentano II is by the stallion Bolero, who was a very successful dressage horse and sire, and a foundation sire for the B-line. His dam, Glocke, by Grande and is from a notable mare line from Hanover. The combination of Bolero and Grande is well known to produce dressage horses.

== Success ==
As a two-year-old, Brentano II was champion at his stallion licensing held at Verden. In 1986, he was second at his stallion performance test, finishing with a score of 129.97. At four, he finished in fourth place at the Federal Championships of the German Riding.

Brentano II was trained to the Grand Prix level of dressage. He was later named Hanoverian Stallion of the Year in 2003.

== Results from his stallion performance test ==
Performance Test: 1986, Adelheidsdorf:

- Overall score 129.97 (2nd of 32)
- Dressage score 141.41 (1st)
- Jumping score 105.20 (15th)

== Progeny ==
Among the most notable progeny of Brentano II are:

- Brentina: Team & Individual Gold at 1999 Pan Am Games, 2001 achieved highest Grand Prix score for an American horse. Part of silver-winning US Dressage Team at the 2002 Olympics.
- Poetin: One of the most expensive dressage prospects to date (sold for over $2,000,000), winner of the World Breeding Championships Dressage of Young Horses and the Federal Championships, before her death. Brentano II was her dam-sire.
