= Sandro Hit =

Dressage stallion

- Breed: Oldenburg
- Sire: Sandro Song (Oldenburg)
- Grandsire: Sandro (Holsteiner)
- Dam: Loretta (Oldenburg)
- Maternal grandsire: Ramino (Hanoverian)
- Sex: Stallion
- Foaled: 1993
- Colour: Black

Sandro Hit (1993 – August 2021) was an Oldenburg stallion that was successful in dressage competition and as a sire of numerous top foals. He stood approximately 17 hands (68 inches, 173 cm).

In 1999, Sandro Hit became the six-year-old dressage horse World Champion, and won the German Federal Championships in Warendorf. He was also named the Best Young Stallion of 2000.

== Progeny ==
Ten licensed sons came out of his first foal crop alone, and his daughter, Poetin 2, was the winner of the 3 year old mare and gelding section at the German Federal Championships in 2000, after which she sold for a record 2.5 million euros. In 2001, 5 of the top 10 foals in Germany were by Sandro Hit, including a Federal Champion and two Vice Champions. One of his progeny, Show Star, was the National Young Horse Champion in 2001 and a Vice-Champion in 2002. In 2002, he produced Sir Wilson and Stedinger, two Champion stallions. Sandro Hit has the highest index in Germany for his descendant's performance, at 153, and also the highest security rating at 88%.

Many of his progeny have sold for record prices. In 2000, his filly, Starlett, sold for DM 140,000, making her the top priced broodmare and top priced Schatzinsel at the Vechta spring auction in 2000. In the 2002 Vechta spring auction, his son, Superstar, sold for over 250,000 euros. In 2003, his filly, Sandritana Olympia was the most expensive foal in the Netherlands when she sold for 31,000 euros. In 2006, a Sandro Hit foal sold for a record 103,000 euros at the Verden Elite Hanoverian Mare and Foal sale.

One of his daughters Hot Summer won a dressage tournament at the age of 7 with 9.8 points.

Sandro Hit was approved for breeding by the Oldenburg, Hanoverian, Rhinelander and Westphalian studbooks, along with all southern German, Swedish, Danish, and French breeding associations.

== Sire line tree ==
- Sandro Hit
  - Sandro Ace
  - Sommerlier
  - Sunny Boy
    - Sambuca
    - Spielberg
      - Suppenkasper
  - Samba Hit I
    - Samba Ole
    - Sambalino
    - Sunny Hit
    - Samurai SB
    - Rumba Hit
    - Samba Genial
    - Sambas Diamond
    - Santorio
    - Sambalito
    - Shiraz
    - Sueno II
  - Sandro King
  - Show Star
  - Blue Hors Soprano
  - Sir Wilson
  - Sandreo
  - San Rubin
  - Stedinger
  - Samarant
  - San Remo
    - Sammy Davis Jr
    - Sanceo
  - Sereno Gold
  - Sir Donnerhall
    - Sir Donnerhall II
    - Sporken
    - Samhitis
    - Standford
  - Santana
  - Superstar
  - Samba Hit II
  - Sancisco
    - Santano
  - Santano II
  - Samba Hit III
  - San Schufro
  - St Mortitz
    - St Moritz Junior
      - Blue Hors St Schufro
        - Skyline To B
        - St Athletique
  - Sungold
  - San Amour
  - Scolari
  - Selten HW
  - Soliere
  - Soliman de Hus
    - Sarotti Mokka Sahne
  - Statesman
  - St Emilion
  - Samba Hit IV
  - Showtime FRH
  - Salvino
  - San Francisco
  - Samba Hit V
  - Sebastein
  - Sintano Van Hof Olympia
  - Seebach

== Pedigree ==
Pedigree of Sandro Hit
Sire Sandro Song Oldenburg 1988	Sandro; Holsteiner; 1974	Sacramento Song; Thoroughbred; 1967	Sicambre - 1948
Sire Sandro Song Oldenburg 1988	Sandro; Holsteiner; 1974	Sacramento Song; Thoroughbred; 1967	Easter Gala - 1956
Sire Sandro Song Oldenburg 1988	Sandro; Holsteiner; 1974	Duerte; Holsteiner; 1967	Wahnfried - 1965
Sire Sandro Song Oldenburg 1988	Sandro; Holsteiner; 1974	Duerte; Holsteiner; 1967	Velour
Sire Sandro Song Oldenburg 1988	Antenne II; Oldenburg; 1984	Gepard; Hanoverian; 1974	Gotthard - 1949
Sire Sandro Song Oldenburg 1988	Antenne II; Oldenburg; 1984	Gepard; Hanoverian; 1974	Feretria - 1962
Sire Sandro Song Oldenburg 1988	Antenne II; Oldenburg; 1984	Antenne; Oldenburg; 1968	Adlerorden - 1962
Sire Sandro Song Oldenburg 1988	Antenne II; Oldenburg; 1984	Antenne; Oldenburg; 1968	Olala - 1959
Dam Loretta Oldenburg 1987	Ramino; Westphalian; 1980	Ramiro Z Holsteiner; 1965	Raimond - 1960
Dam Loretta Oldenburg 1987	Ramino; Westphalian; 1980	Ramiro Z Holsteiner; 1965	Valine - 1961
Dam Loretta Oldenburg 1987	Ramino; Westphalian; 1980	Dombuche; Westphalian; 1968	Dominik - 1957
Dam Loretta Oldenburg 1987	Ramino; Westphalian; 1980	Dombuche; Westphalian; 1968	Gotenmeer - 1960
Dam Loretta Oldenburg 1987	Lassie; Oldenburg; 1983	Welt AS; Oldenburg; 1977	Weltmeister - 1973
Dam Loretta Oldenburg 1987	Lassie; Oldenburg; 1983	Welt AS; Oldenburg; 1977	Elfene - 1970
Dam Loretta Oldenburg 1987	Lassie; Oldenburg; 1983	Lucie; Oldenburg; 1977	Luciano - 1971
Dam Loretta Oldenburg 1987	Lassie; Oldenburg; 1983	Lucie; Oldenburg; 1977	Waidmannsheil Mare - 1973
