= Voltaire (show jumping horse) =

- Breed: Dutch Warmblood (KWPN); approved for KWPN, Hanoverian, Selle Français, Oldenburg
- Sire: Furioso II
- Dam: Gogo Moeve
- Maternal grandsire: Gotthard
- Sex: Stallion
- Foaled: 1979
- Colour: Bay with a blaze, snip, stockings on both hind legs
- Breeder: E. Kuwet
- Trainer: Jos Lansink

Voltaire (1979–2004) was show jumping horse who became an influential sire of show jumpers and dressage horses.

== Breeding ==
Voltaire, at 16 hands (64 inches, 163 cm) high stallion (originally called "Vertuoso"), was by the influential Furioso II, a stallion whose offspring include over 200 state premium mares and at least 70 approved sons, who are stood across the world. Furioso II was full-brother to the French stallion Mexico (sire of Le Mexico, who has produced numerous Grand Prix show jumpers). Furioso II was also the sire of the Olympic gold medal winners Lutteur B and Pomone B.

Voltaire's dam, Gogo Moeve, was also the dam to such horses as Fandango R, PS Falkan and Petite Fleur. She was sired by the great Gotthard, a stallion who has made his mark in the Hanoverian breed. Gotthard is seen in the pedigree of such horses as Goldika, Goya, Queensway, Genius, Grundstein and Grannus. Gogo Moeve's dam-sire was the Thoroughbred stallion More Magic, who also sired the 1980 Moscow Olympics dressage gold medalist, Mon Cherie, ridden by Elisabeth Theurer.

== Show jumping career ==
Voltaire had a successful career as a Grand Prix show jumper, competing over 1.50 meter courses as an eight-year-old. He was especially successful in 1988, winning Nations Cup classes at Calgary, Stockholm, Lanaken, Helsinki, Wiesbaden and Wembley. In 1989 he ended his competitive career with a win at the Grand Prix of Berlin and a 2nd place in the Grand Prix of Leeuwarden.

== Stud career ==
After his competitive career, Voltaire was retired for breeding, standing at Dutch veterinarian Jan Greve's stud De Watermolen. Voltaire was a Keur and Preferent stallion with the KWPN, and was one of the top KWPN jumping sires during his life. Voltaire stood at the stud until his death at the age of 25, when he suffered from a heart attack while covering a mare.

Voltaire was said to cross well with French Thoroughbreds, such as the female offspring of Furioso and those of Furioso's sons Le Mexico and Purioso.

=== Stallion approval ===
With his small size and a large hoof crack, Voltaire was originally rejected by the Oldenburg licensing commission. The KWPN commission was also not thrilled, and graded him 14th out of 14 horses in the performance test (despite his excellent jumping marks). However, he was eventually approved with several studbooks, including the Oldenburg.

=== Success of offspring ===
Voltaire produced numerous international-caliber horses during his lifetime. From his first crop, he sired the approved stallion Concorde. Concorde went on to compete internationally in show jumping, including the 1994 Dutch Championships, and is now a well-known breeding stallion who has sired Viktor, ridden by McLain Ward, and Conquest, ridden by Todd Minikus and Beezie Madden.

Voltaire had over 30 approved sons in Europe. He is found in the pedigrees of 28 jumpers of the 2000–2001 World Breeding Federation for Sport Horse standings, was ranked 9th in the Federation's top 50 sires for the years 1991–2000, and finished second in 1999 in the list of show jumping sires. Additionally, Voltaire had the most offspring at the 1996 Olympic Games that any other stallion. He is also found in the pedigree of one of the world's greatest dressage horses, Valegro, as his great grandsire.

Voltaire has also been a great sire of show hunters in the United States. He was awarded the title of "Huntersire of the Year" for 2001, 2002, and 2003. In 2003, he not only finished as the USAEq leading hunter sire, with 33 offspring, but also as the USEq leading jumper sire, having 25 offspring who earned a total of $176,189. Notable hunters with include Popeye K, Nobleman, King de Coquerie and Mandkind.

=== Type produced by Voltaire ===
Voltaire's offspring were generally late-maturing, not showing their jumping abilities until the age of five or six after correct riding had helped to develop it. According to Jacques Verkerk of the KWPN: "Voltaire produces roughly two types of horse; rather square exteriors with an articulate top-line or big rectangular horses with a lot of bone."

Generally, the sons and daughters of Voltaire have scope, power, and a tight front end. However, they often have a short back, and may not have perfect technique with their hind end. Although they have a good galloping stride, they may be slow and have a slightly too-straight hind leg. But they are very careful jumpers, generally want to go clean (a very important trait in a show jumper), and are brave.

== Offspring ==
Voltaire has sired offspring that have gone on to be successful in both the show jumping and dressage arenas. Voltaire sired such horses as Concorde, Royal Kaliber, Response, Finesse, Play it Again, Altaire, Especiale, Kannan, Lemato, Mezcalero (represented Mexico in the 1998 World Equestrian Games, and jumped in many Nations Cup competitions under rider Frederico Fernandez), Farmer (sire of Olympic reserve Lowina), Ecuador (sire of 2004 Dutch Olympic dressage team member Idocus), Lancelot KWPN (ex Nimmerdor, and sire of Pavorotti, Tristan, Parcival, SF Sadin, and many more international horses), and One More Look (high-scoring foal at the NASFA 2002 Foal Evaluations). Other notable offspring include Foltaire (international dressage horse ridden by Guenter Seidel), Helios, Electro, Jemesis, Danta, and Kahlua. Some of Voltaire's successful hunter offspring include: Churchill, Popeye K, Blink, High Cotton, King de Coquerie, and Moriah.

== Pedigree ==
Pedigree of Voltaire
Sire Furioso II dk ch. 1965 Anglo Norman	Furioso b. 1957; Thoroughbred	Precipitation ch. 1933; Thoroughbred	Hurry On
Sire Furioso II dk ch. 1965 Anglo Norman	Furioso b. 1957; Thoroughbred	Precipitation ch. 1933; Thoroughbred	Double Life
Sire Furioso II dk ch. 1965 Anglo Norman	Furioso b. 1957; Thoroughbred	Maureen b. 1931; Thoroughbred	Son-in-Law
Sire Furioso II dk ch. 1965 Anglo Norman	Furioso b. 1957; Thoroughbred	Maureen b. 1931; Thoroughbred	Saint Prisca
Sire Furioso II dk ch. 1965 Anglo Norman	Dame de Ranville dk ch. 1947; Selle Français	Talisman ch. 1941; Selle Français	Le Royal
Sire Furioso II dk ch. 1965 Anglo Norman	Dame de Ranville dk ch. 1947; Selle Français	Talisman ch. 1941; Selle Français	Kreole
Sire Furioso II dk ch. 1965 Anglo Norman	Dame de Ranville dk ch. 1947; Selle Français	Que Je Suis Belle ch. 1943; Selle Français	Lor Orange
Sire Furioso II dk ch. 1965 Anglo Norman	Dame de Ranville dk ch. 1947; Selle Français	Que Je Suis Belle ch. 1943; Selle Français	Comedie
Dam Gogo Moeve br. 1975	Gotthard g. 1949; Hanoverian	Goldfisch II blk. 1935; Hanoverian	Goldammer II
Dam Gogo Moeve br. 1975	Gotthard g. 1949; Hanoverian	Goldfisch II blk. 1935; Hanoverian	Flugamme
Dam Gogo Moeve br. 1975	Gotthard g. 1949; Hanoverian	Ampa g. 1942; Hanoverian	Amateur I
Dam Gogo Moeve br. 1975	Gotthard g. 1949; Hanoverian	Ampa g. 1942; Hanoverian	Ameline
Dam Gogo Moeve br. 1975	Mosaik blk. 1966	More Magic g. 1957; Thoroughbred	Volmorin
Dam Gogo Moeve br. 1975	Mosaik blk. 1966	More Magic g. 1957; Thoroughbred	Jules Magic
Dam Gogo Moeve br. 1975	Mosaik blk. 1966	Erich Stute; 1957	Erich
Dam Gogo Moeve br. 1975	Mosaik blk. 1966	Erich Stute; 1957	Alpenaehre
