= Royal Kaliber =

Show jumping horse

- Breed: Dutch Warmblood
- Sire: Ramiro Z (Holstein)
- Dam: Fiedonja
- Maternal grandsire: Voltaire (Dutch Warmblood)
- Sex: Stallion
- Foaled: April 12, 1992
- Country: The United States
- Colour: Dark Bay with a large star, thin stripe, high socks on RF and both hind
- Breeder: Jan Lamers (Netherlands)
- Owner: Chris Kappler & Kamine Family
- Trainer: Chris Kappler

Royal Kaliber
Medal record

Equestrian

Olympic Games
Silver medal – second place	2004 Athens	Individual show jumping
Gold medal – first place	2004 Athens	Team show jumping

Pan American Games
Gold medal – first place	2003 Santo Domingo	Team show jumping
Silver medal – second place	2003 Santo Domingo	Individual show jumping

Royal Kaliber was a Dutch Warmblood stallion that competed at the Grand Prix level of show jumping, and was part of the United States Show Jumping Team at the 2004 Athens Olympic Games.

== Show jumping career ==
American Chris Kappler first began riding the Dutch Warmblood when the horse was 8, after receiving him from Ben Boessen. Boessen trained the horse for the large competitions. Kappler rode him to several impressive wins, and Royal Kaliber was named 2002-2003 AGA Horse of the Year and 2003 U.S. Equestrian Horse of the Year.

=== 2004 Olympic Games ===
Royal Kaliber was a part of the US Show Jumping Team at the 2004 Athens Olympics, winners of the team silver medal. However, while jumping in the final round of the individual competition, he had an awkward landing from the 15th fence on course, a large oxer. Kappler felt his mount take an odd step and, with only two fences to go, pulled him up and dismounted. A diagnosis by the team veterinarian found that the horse had an acute strain to his superficial digital flexor tendon of his left foreleg. This made him the third show jumping horse to be injured, which brought up questions of the suitability of the footing. Royal Kaliber was pulled from competition, but his previous effort had still earned him the individual bronze. It was decided to keep the stallion in Europe until he had completely recovered from his injury, before shipping him home. Following the disqualification of gold medalist, Cian O'Connor of Ireland, for a drug infraction, Kappler and Royal Kaliber were awarded the individual silver medal.

=== Resulting colic ===
Royal Kaliber's leg was said to be healing very well following the Games. However, the horse began experiencing problems with colic, and an ultrasound was performed finding intestinal adhesion. The veterinarians Dr. Jack Snyder and Dr. Barry David (who flew in from the United States) and Dr. Edwin Enzerink deemed that surgery was appropriate, and on 27 September 2004, they performed the procedure at the Veterinair Centrum Someren in Someren, the Netherlands. Finding the intestine adhered to the spleen, they removed parts of both the large and small intestine. Royal Kaliber appeared stable after the surgery, but his health worsened on 6 October. The veterinary team performed another surgery, and found that further adhesions had occurred, which were non-repairable. The decision was then made to euthanize him on 8 October 2004.

== Offspring ==
By chance, a sample of Royal Kaliber's semen was collected for approval testing. Using the surplus, it was possible to breed a few mares, and the result was four offspring: one was sold to Europe, one given as a gift to trainer Frank Chapot, one to a client of Chapot's, and a filly was kept by the owners of Royal Kaliber.

== Accomplishments ==
2004

- Team gold and individual silver medal at the Athens Olympics
- 2nd $60,000 Idle Dice Classic (Wellington, Florida)

2003

- Team gold and individual silver medal at the Pan American Games (Dominican Republic)
- 1st Grand Prix at Devon (Devon, PA)
- 1st $200,000 Budweiser American Invitational (Tampa, FL)
- 1st AGA Show Jumping Championships (Wellington, FL)
- Named U.S. Equestrian Horse of the Year and American Grand Prix Association Horse of the Year

2002

- 1st $175,000 Cargill Grand Prix of the United States (San Juan Capistrano, CA)
- 1st $52,100 Bayer/USET Wellington Cup (Wellington, FL)
- 1st $50,000 Bayer/USET Wellington Cup (Wellington, FL)
- 1st $60,000 Budweiser American Gold Cup (Devon, PA)

2001

- 2nd $75,000 Ford Idle Dice Classic
- 2nd $200,000 Budweiser American Invitational
- 2nd $75,000 Kilkenny Internationale Cup (Wellington, FL)

== Pedigree ==
Pedigree of Royal Kaliber
Sire Ramiro Z dkb/br. 1965 Holstein	Raimond g. 1960; Holstein	Ramzes g. 1937; Anglo-Arabian	Rittersporn
Sire Ramiro Z dkb/br. 1965 Holstein	Raimond g. 1960; Holstein	Ramzes g. 1937; Anglo-Arabian	Jordi
Sire Ramiro Z dkb/br. 1965 Holstein	Raimond g. 1960; Holstein	Infra br. 1950; Holstein	Fanatiker
Sire Ramiro Z dkb/br. 1965 Holstein	Raimond g. 1960; Holstein	Infra br. 1950; Holstein	Lining
Sire Ramiro Z dkb/br. 1965 Holstein	Valine dkb/br. 1961; Holstein	Cottage Son blk/br. 1944; Thoroughbred	Young Lover
Sire Ramiro Z dkb/br. 1965 Holstein	Valine dkb/br. 1961; Holstein	Cottage Son blk/br. 1944; Thoroughbred	Wait Not
Sire Ramiro Z dkb/br. 1965 Holstein	Valine dkb/br. 1961; Holstein	Holle; 1949; Holstein	Logenschliesser
Sire Ramiro Z dkb/br. 1965 Holstein	Valine dkb/br. 1961; Holstein	Holle; 1949; Holstein	Ilona
Dam Fiedonja	Voltaire br. 1979; Hanoverian	Furioso II dk ch. 1965; Anglo Norman	Furioso
Dam Fiedonja	Voltaire br. 1979; Hanoverian	Furioso II dk ch. 1965; Anglo Norman	Dame de Ranville
Dam Fiedonja	Voltaire br. 1979; Hanoverian	Gogo Moeve br. 1975; Hanoverian	Gotthard
Dam Fiedonja	Voltaire br. 1979; Hanoverian	Gogo Moeve br. 1975; Hanoverian	Mosaik
Dam Fiedonja	Adonja; Dutch Warmblood	Stuyvesant dkb/br. 1973; Thoroughbred	Priamos
Dam Fiedonja	Adonja; Dutch Warmblood	Stuyvesant dkb/br. 1973; Thoroughbred	Sabera
Dam Fiedonja	Adonja; Dutch Warmblood	Sonja	Frappant
Dam Fiedonja	Adonja; Dutch Warmblood	Sonja	Majon
