= Bolero (horse) =

- Breed: 3/4 Thoroughbred, registered Hanoverian
- Sire: Black Sky (Thoroughbred)
- Grandsire: Blast (Thoroughbred)
- Dam: Baronesse (Hanoverian)
- Maternal grandsire: Bleep (Thoroughbred)
- Sex: Stallion
- Foaled: 1975
- Country: Germany
- Colour: Chestnut with a star
- Breeder: Heinrich Behmann

Bolero (1975–1986) was a dressage horse and an influential sire. He stood 16.1 hands (65 inches, 165 cm).

== Pedigree ==
Bolero was by the English Thoroughbred stallion Black Sky, who was imported to Germany in 1972. Black Sky was a grandson of the great stallion Djebel, who also sired the very influential My Babu, a stallion seen in many show jumpers, and hunters pedigrees in the United States. Black Sky stood at the private stud farm of Schmidt-Ankum, and his offspring were generally talented dressage horses with good rideability, but with very little jumping talent. As such, Bolero is a male-line descendant of the Byerley Turk.

Bolero's dam, Baroness, was registered with the Hanoverian Verband. She was half-Thoroughbred through her sire, the large-framed stallion Bleep. Her dam's side includes Hyperion, who in turn traces to Bay Ronald. The dam-sire of Baroness was the stallion Athos, who was known as a broodmare sire of dressage horses, and her damline (Athos-Fliegerstern) also produced the stallions Grenadier, Hitchcock, and Winner.

This breeding combination of a Thoroughbred stallion to a mare that was by a Thoroughbred was prohibited by the Hanoverian studbook at the time, due to the belief that the offspring would be unsuccessful.

Pedigree for Bolero
1975 Chestnut colt

Pedigree of Bolero
Sire Black Sky br. 1966	Blast b. 1957	Djebe gr. 1945	Djebel
Sire Black Sky br. 1966	Blast b. 1957	Djebe gr. 1945	Catherine
Sire Black Sky br. 1966	Blast b. 1957	Gale Warning; 1952	Nimbus
Sire Black Sky br. 1966	Blast b. 1957	Gale Warning; 1952	Squall
Sire Black Sky br. 1966	Madrilene ch. 1951	Court Martial ch. 1942	Fair Trial
Sire Black Sky br. 1966	Madrilene ch. 1951	Court Martial ch. 1942	Instantaneous
Sire Black Sky br. 1966	Madrilene ch. 1951	Marmite gr. 1935	Mr Jinks
Sire Black Sky br. 1966	Madrilene ch. 1951	Marmite gr. 1935	Gentlemen's Relish
Dam Baronesse ch. 1970	Bleep ch. 1956	Pinza b. 1950	Chanteur
Dam Baronesse ch. 1970	Bleep ch. 1956	Pinza b. 1950	Pasqua
Dam Baronesse ch. 1970	Bleep ch. 1956	The Satellite; 1946	Hyperion
Dam Baronesse ch. 1970	Bleep ch. 1956	The Satellite; 1946	Rhodean
Dam Baronesse ch. 1970	Atlastaube ch. 1949	Athos br. 1938	Allerhand
Dam Baronesse ch. 1970	Atlastaube ch. 1949	Athos br. 1938	Anhris
Dam Baronesse ch. 1970	Atlastaube ch. 1949	Fliegerheil; 1942	Fliegerstern
Dam Baronesse ch. 1970	Atlastaube ch. 1949	Fliegerheil; 1942	Freiheit

== Breeding career ==
Bolero did only moderately well at his 100-day stallion test held at Adelheidsdorf, placing 6th out of 30 stallions with a final score of 111. He stood at Landesbrück from 1979 until his death of a heart attack at the age of 12. He only stood for 9 seasons, making his impact on the breeding of Hanoverians even more spectacular.

=== Influence ===
Despite the relatively short breeding career, Bolero was remarkably influential on the breeding of dressage horses, although like his father, his offspring are generally poor jumpers. His high degree of Thoroughbred blood brought an elegance to his progeny, and this trend toward a lighter dressage horse has been on the rise since he stood at stud. He consistently produced offspring with good shoulders and toplines, as well as elastic and rhythmic gaits.

Bolero was the founding sire of a new B-Line in the 1990s, and produced the stallion Brentano II, who also became a foundation stallion for this line. Bolero was found to be most successful with daughters of Grande and Duellant. Breeders continue to cross the B-Line with the G- and D- lines to produce successful dressage horses, as well as those by Argus.

The stallion sired 47 licensed stallions during his time at stud, the most important being Brentano I and II, Buenos Aires, Bismark, and Beltain. As a well-known sire of sires, Bolero sons have been exported around the world. Bolero has also made a name for himself as a sire of broodmares, producing 317 mares that went on to be registered, 96 of whom earned the status of State Premium. The great success of his mares gave him a dressage ranking of 139 (against a rather poor 57 for jumping).

=== Sons and Daughters ===
Bolero began with 5 sons attending the Verden licensing, of which 4 were selected. His offspring, known as the "Bolero Boom", continue to make their mark on the dressage scene. As of 2000, there were 412 Bolero offspring competing, with winnings of DM1,282,504. Three of his descendants medaled at the 2004 Summer Olympics in Athens, Greece: Brentina, Bonaparte, and Beauvalais.

- Buenos Aires: champion of his year
- Brentano II: the most successful son of Bolero, competed up to Grand Prix in dressage. Progeny including Olympic medalist Brentina, Poetin, Olympic contender Barclay II, and Bona Dea II. Last Offspring: Brentano Ultimo Brentano II#Progeny, chestnut colt born in May 2006. Video Clip and photos at
- Beauvalais: under Beatriz Ferrer-Salat, won individual silver and team bronze at the 2002 World Equestrian Games, and team silver and individual bronze at the 2004 Olympic Games in Athens.
- Batumi: this mare won the 1986 DLG Championship
- Beltain: sired Bellissimo, the Champion six-year-old at the 2005 Bundeschampionate
- Baccarole: 1989 Champion mare at the Louis-Wiegels Show, 1990 European Champion mare at Brussels
- Baltengracie: 1991 Champion mare of the Louis-Wiegels Show
- Boruschkin: 1984 three-year-old Riding Horse Champion at the Bundeschampionate, advanced level dressage horse. Later sold at the Verden auction for 110,000 DM
- Bini Bo: 1987 three-year-old Riding Horse Champion at the Bundeschampionate, advanced level dressage horse
- Bocaccio: 1988 three-year-old Riding Horse Champion at the Bundeschampionate, advanced level dressage horse
- Borsalino: Grand Prix horse under Heike Kemmer
- Bossanova: Grand Prix horse under Anna Merveldt-Steffan
- Bon Bonaparte: sire of the Grand Prix horse Bonaparte (ridden by Heike Kemmer)
- Bismarck: trained to Grand Prix, sire of Breitling W (who had a remarkable number of very good offspring himself), Barnsby W, and Burlington W.
