= For Pleasure =

- Breed: Hanoverian
- Sire: Furioso II
- Dam: Gigantin
- Maternal grandsire: Grannus
- Sex: Stallion
- Foaled: 14 January 1986; Adelheidsdorf, Germany
- Died: 18 February 2011 (aged 25); Borken, North Rhine-Westphalia, Germany
- Country: Germany
- Colour: Chestnut sabino
- Breeder: Robert Diestel
- Owner: Robert Diestel-Stiftung
- Rider: Marcus Ehning, Lars Nieburg

Earnings
- 1.8 million Euros

Awards
- 2000 Hanoverian Stallion of the Year

For Pleasure
Medal record

Olympics
Gold medal – first place	2000 Sydney	Team Jumping
Gold medal – first place	1996 Atlanta	Team Jumping

European Championships
Gold medal – first place	2003 Donaüschingen	Team Jumping
Bronze medal – third place	2003 Donaüschingen	Individual Jumping
Gold medal – first place	1999 Hickstead	Team Jumping

German Championships
Gold medal – first place	2002 Mannheim	Jumping
Silver medal – second place	2000 Balve	Jumping

For Pleasure (14 January 1986 – 18 February 2011) was a Hanoverian horse who competed in international show jumping under riders Lars Nieburg and Marcus Ehning. He won numerous Grand Prix events during his unusually long career, from which he was retired in 2006 at the age of 20.

For Pleasure was born at Robert Diestel's stable in 1986. His dam's line is a collection of prominent sires of show-jumpers and the breeding to Furioso II added sought after refining French blood. A breeding which matched. For Pleasure passed his performance test at Medingen as winner in the jumping test with 145.95 points. Afterwards he was trained by Hans-Joachim Giebel. In 1993 the then seven-year-old celebrated his first win in an open jumper class and became Lower-Saxony Champion. With his new rider Lars Nieberg, For Pleasure's spectacular international career began in 1994.

With rider Lars Nieberg, For Pleasure won gold at the International Championships three times. They went on to win gold at the 1996 Olympic Games in Atlanta. Then in 1999, German rider Marcus Ehning took over the reins and a new dream pair was born. Only seven months after their first start the two won team gold at the European Championships and reached fifth place in the individual ranking. Then in 2000 they won gold with the German team and a brilliant fourth place in the individual ranking at the Olympic Games in Sydney. With both riders, For Pleasure won 75 S-level classes. In the last eight years of his career, For Pleasure contributed to four championship victories for the German Show Jumping team and won team gold four times. He won his last Grand Prix in 2004 at the World Cup in Leipzig, Germany. He was 18 years old at the time. He won the class over a massive indoor course, "the highest track I have ever jumped with him indoors" said rider, Marcus Ehning. He was retired in 2006 at the age of 20, finished his career with staggering lifetime earnings of 1.8 million Euros.

By 2004, For Pleasure had sired 16 approved breeding stallions through and 169 sporthorses.

On February 18, 2011, For Pleasure died on a pasture at the yard of the Ehning family.

== Licensing ==
For Pleasure completed the Medingen 100-day stallion performance test on August 11, 1989. He was ultimately ranked 15th among 68 peers based on normalized scores. His index of 91.91 placed him 46th in Dressage, while his score of 145.95 placed him 1st in Show jumping. He was also ranked first for rideability.

== Pedigree ==
Pedigree of For Pleasure
Sire Furioso II 1965 Selle Francais	Furioso xx 1939 Thoroughbred	Precipitation xx 1933 Thoroughbred	Hurry On xx (1913)
Sire Furioso II 1965 Selle Francais	Furioso xx 1939 Thoroughbred	Precipitation xx 1933 Thoroughbred	Double Life xx (1926)
Sire Furioso II 1965 Selle Francais	Furioso xx 1939 Thoroughbred	Maureen xx 1931 Thoroughbred	Son-In-Law xx (1911)
Sire Furioso II 1965 Selle Francais	Furioso xx 1939 Thoroughbred	Maureen xx 1931 Thoroughbred	St. Prisca xx (1926)
Sire Furioso II 1965 Selle Francais	Dame de Ranville; 1947 Selle Francais	Talisman; 1941 Selle Francais	Le Royal (1933)
Sire Furioso II 1965 Selle Francais	Dame de Ranville; 1947 Selle Francais	Talisman; 1941 Selle Francais	Kreole (1932)
Sire Furioso II 1965 Selle Francais	Dame de Ranville; 1947 Selle Francais	Que Je Suis Belle; 1943 Selle Francais	Lord Orange (1933)
Sire Furioso II 1965 Selle Francais	Dame de Ranville; 1947 Selle Francais	Que Je Suis Belle; 1943 Selle Francais	Comedie (1924)
Dam Gigantin 1980 Hanoverian	Grannus; 1972 Hanoverian	Graphit; 1964 Hanoverian	Grande (1958)
Dam Gigantin 1980 Hanoverian	Grannus; 1972 Hanoverian	Graphit; 1964 Hanoverian	St. Pr.St. Frutana (1958)
Dam Gigantin 1980 Hanoverian	Grannus; 1972 Hanoverian	St. Pr.St. Odessa; 1967 Hanoverian	Ozean/T. (1952)
Dam Gigantin 1980 Hanoverian	Grannus; 1972 Hanoverian	St. Pr.St. Odessa; 1967 Hanoverian	Gitta (1961)
Dam Gigantin 1980 Hanoverian	Goldi; 1976 Hanoverian	Goya; 1971 Hanoverian	Gotthard (1949)
Dam Gigantin 1980 Hanoverian	Goldi; 1976 Hanoverian	Goya; 1971 Hanoverian	Doma H (1963)
Dam Gigantin 1980 Hanoverian	Goldi; 1976 Hanoverian	Fortuna; 1969 Hanoverian	Fernjaeger (1943)
Dam Gigantin 1980 Hanoverian	Goldi; 1976 Hanoverian	Fortuna; 1969 Hanoverian	Winzerflocke (1955)

== See also ==
- Flora de Mariposa
