= Jessica Mendoza (equestrian) =

British female equestrian

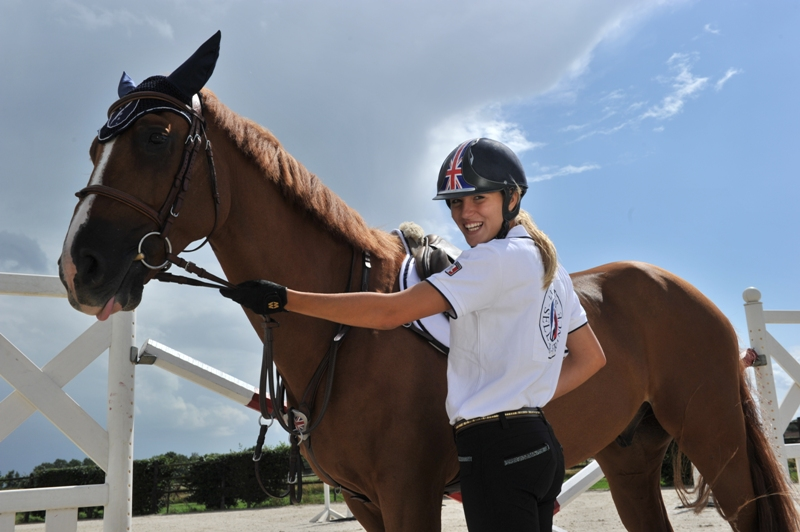

Personal information
- Full name: Jessica Mendoza
- Nationality: British
- Discipline: Show jumping
- Born: 9 April 1996; Cheltenham, England
Medal record
Equestrian
Representing United Kingdom
Junior Europeans
Gold medal – first place	2014	Team jumping
Silver medal – second place	2013	Team jumping
Bronze medal – third place	2014	Individual jumping
Pony Europeans
Gold medal – first place	2012	Team jumping
Gold medal – first place	2011	Team jumping
Bronze medal – third place	2011	Individual jumping

Jessica Mendoza is one of the UK's top female equestrian athletes, who broke into the world's top 100 riders, and into the top 10 British showjumping riders in Spring 2015. She is also a regular contributor to the British monthly magazine PONY.

In 2013, Mendoza was accepted into the British Equestrian Federation UK Sport-funded World Class Development Programme, which works with talented riders to maximise their potential and deliver success for Team GBR. She has ridden on British teams at major international championships every year since.

Born and brought up in Chippenham, Wiltshire, Mendoza started her international showjumping career on the International Pony and junior riders circuits (2011–14), taking numerous medal honours across highly consistent performances. Since 2014, she competes from her Central European base in Eindhoven, the 'showjumping capital' of the Netherlands.

== Early years ==
Mendoza started riding horses at the age of 2, and four years later decided she wanted to be a professional show jumper. Even an incident at the age of 10, where she punctured a lung after being trod on by a horse who bucked her off, did not drive her away from the sport. She was named Leading Pony Rider by British Showjumping on two consecutive occasions, in 2009 and 2010.

Mendoza represented Great Britain four times at the Pony European Championships, riding Tixylix. Her first appearance was in Moorsele, Belgium, in 2009, where she finished in sixth place individually. She was selected again in 2010 to ride at the championships at Bishop Burton, Great Britain.

In 2011 she was on the winning British team at the Pony European Championships held in Jaszkowo, Poland, and went on to win an individual bronze. In 2012, she won her second Team Gold at the Pony Europeans in Fontainebleau, France.

In 2013 Mendoza moved on to the Junior Riders European Team and won Team Silver in Vejer de la Frontera, Spain. In the following year, she further added to her medal tally, winning Team Gold and Individual Bronze at the European Championships in Arezzo, Italy, riding Spirit T.

== Career achievements (2014 onwards) ==
Following her major successes pony/junior levels, Mendoza embarked on her career in horse and senior classes in 2014, and soon started to notch up major successes at Grand Prix level.

Mendoza has become a regular competitor on the senior international circuit and is a regular at the Longines Global Champions Tour, the World's Premier 5 star International Showjumping Series.

In April 2014 Mendoza competed in her first CSI4* event at Antwerp, achieving two wins riding Spirit T and Ramiro de Belle Vue. The results continued to mount, and the following month she claimed her first jumping derby at Eindhoven with Ramiro De Belle Vue.

In August 2014, Mendoza competed on home soil in her first CSI5* competition at the London leg of the Longines Global Championship Tour, in Horseguards Parade, winning her first 5-star competition. This made her the youngest ever winner at the most prestigious show jumping tour in the world.

Other major wins followed at the end of that year at the Paris Gucci Masters, where Mendoza rode Spirit T, and at Salzburg CSI4*, where she rode Ramiro De Belle Vue. Her first World Cup qualifier was at Leipzig in 2015, gaining invaluable experience and finishing in 9th place with Spirit T.

In mid-February 2015, Mendoza competed at the Longines Hong Kong Masters CSI5*. She was one of the British trio who took the three top positions in the Gucci Gold Cup: John Whitaker 1st, Mendoza 2nd, and world's number one Scott Brash 3rd.

A series of consistent performances during the summer of 2015 secured her places on British Nations Cup teams, including taking Team Gold (Rotterdam nations Cup, June 2015).

Mendoza's international senior championship debut at the FEI European Championships saw her become the youngest British international competitor in nearly 40 years. Her final round in the Team competition proved crucial in gaining Rio Olympic qualification for Team GBR. Mendoza was ranked 65 in the world and was Britain's second top female rider, as of 31 August 2015.

In the autumn of 2015, Mendoza was announced as the Longines Rising Star of 2015 at the annual FEI Awards, in recognition of her outstanding sporting talent. She also took British Showjumping's Young (under 21) Rider of the Year Award for 2015.

In 2016, at the age of 20, she became the youngest competitor in 40 years to join the Team GBR Olympic squad when she was travelling reserve in Rio.

Her latest showjumping results in are recorded on the FEI database.

== Major achievements ==
Year	Month	Achievement
2013	January	1st – Nuggets L'Amandour, Addington; Classic Highfly, Bury Farm
2013	February	3rd – Classic Highfly, World Class Development Programme U23; 1st – Classic Highfly, Aintree
2013	March	1st – Balougio, Oliva Nova CSI1*; 1st – Balougio, Oliva Nova CSI1*; 1st – Balougio, Oliva Nova CSI1*; 1st – Spirit T, Oliva Nova CSI1*
2013	April	1st – Spirit T, Chantilly CSI2*; 1st – Bril B, Chantilly CSI2*; 1st – Spirit T, Oliva Nova CSI1*
2013	May	1st – Balougio, Deauville; 5th – Spirit T, Junior Nations Cup Deauville; 1st – Balougio, Chepstow CSI**
2013	June	1st – Ramiro de Belle Vue, Fontainebleau CSI2*; 2nd – Spirit T, Junior Nations Cup, Hagen
2013	July	TEAM SILVER Junior Europeans – Spirit T
2013	August	1st – Balougio, Auvers CSI2*; 1st – Balougio, Auvers CSI2*; 1st – Nuggets L'Amandour, Int Trial New Forest Show
2013	September	1st – Ramiro de Belle Vue, Zandhoven CSI3*
2013	October	1st – Classic Highfly, Lier CSI2*
2013	December	3rd - Spirit T Young Riders Final Olympia; 2nd - Spirit T 1.45 Ranking Class CSI** Gucci Masters Paris; 2nd - Ramiro De Belle Vue 1.35 CSI** Gucci Masters
2014	February	1st – Ramiro de Belle Vue, Gent CSI2*; LEADING RIDER Lier Indoor Championship Tour
2014	March	1st – Classic Highfly, Arezzo CSI2*; 1st – Falballa de Messitert, Arezzo CSI2*; 1st – Ramiro de Belle Vue, Arezzo CSI2*
2014	April	1st – Ramiro de Belle Vue, Antwerp CSI4*; 1st – Spirit T, Antwerp CSI4*
2014	May	1st – Ramiro de Belle Vue, Eindoven (Derby) CSI3*; 1st – Nuggets L'Amandour, Redefin CSI2*
2014	June	1st – Spirti T, Asten CSI2*; 1st – Classic Highfly, Asten CSI2*
2014	July	INDIVIDUAL BRONZE MEDAL, Junior Europeans Arezzo, Spirit T; TEAM GOLD MEDAL, Junior Europeans Arezzo, Spirit T; 1st – Nuggets L'Amandour, Opglabeek CSI2*; 1st – Classic Highfly, Spangenberg CSI3*
2014	August	1st – Ramiro de Belle Vue, London GCT CSI5*; 1st – Classic Highfly, Valkenswaard CSI2*
2014	October	1st – Ramiro de Belle Vue, Oliva CSI2*
2014	November	1st – Nuggets L'Amandour, Lechtenvoorten; 1st – Spirit T, Oliva CSI2*
2014	December	1st – Ramiro De Belle Vue, Salzburg CSI4*; 1st – Spirit T, Gucci Masters
2015	January	9th – Spirit T World Cup CSI5*
2015	February	2nd – Spirit T, Hong Kong CSI5*; 1st – Nuggets L'Amandour, Lier CSI2*
2015	March	1st – Ramiro De Belle Vue, Arezzo CSI3*; 1st – Ramiro De Belle Vue, Arezzo CSI3*; 1st – Spirit T, Arezzo CSI3*; 1st – Ramiro De Belle Vue, Arezzo CSI3*
2015	April	1st – Sam de Bacon, Arezzo CSI3*; 1st – Nuggets L'Amandour, Arezzo CSI3*; 1st – Classic Highfly, Arezzo CSI3*; 1st – Ramiro De Belle Vue, Arezzo CSI3*
2015	May	6th - Spirit T 1.60 Global Tour Grand Prix Shang hai CSI*****
2015	June	1st - TEAM GB - Spirit T - Nations Cup Spirit T Rotterdam CSI*****; 4th - Spirit T 1.60 Grand Prix St Gallen CSI*****
2015	July	6th - Spirit T 1.60 Global Tour Grand Prix Estoril CSI*****
2015	August	1st - Ramiro de Belle Vue 1.40 St Moritz CSI****; 4th - TEAM GB - Spirit T - European Championships Aachen Nations Cup CSIO*****; 4th - Spirit T 1.60 King George Grand Prix CSI*****, Hickstead Royal International
2015	September	2nd - TEAM GB - Spirit T - Nations Cup Final Barcelona CSI*****
2015	October	2nd - Spirit T 1.60 World Cup Helsinki CSI-W*****; 3rd - Spirit T 1.60 Grand Prix Oslo CSI-W*****
