= Stockholm Horse Show =

International horse show held each November in Stockholm, Sweden

The Stockholm International Horse Show, also known as the Sweden International Horse Show, is an annual international horse show held in Stockholm, Sweden. The show is held every year in November. It is the largest international equestrian indoor event in Sweden, together with the Gothenburg Horse Show. Since 2014 the event is hosted in Strawberry Arena.

The show includes several disciplines, such as Show-Jumping, Dressage, Eventing and Carriage Driving. The Dressage is a 5* event for the best Top 10 Dressage riders from the World Ranking List, the so-called 'Top 10 Dressage' CDI5. For show-jumping the 4* CSI event is part of the program. For driving the show is part of the FEI World Cup series. Besides the international disciplines, the program also includes shows, national classes and a competition for Icelandic Horses.
