= Saut Hermès =

Annual show jumping competition in Paris, France

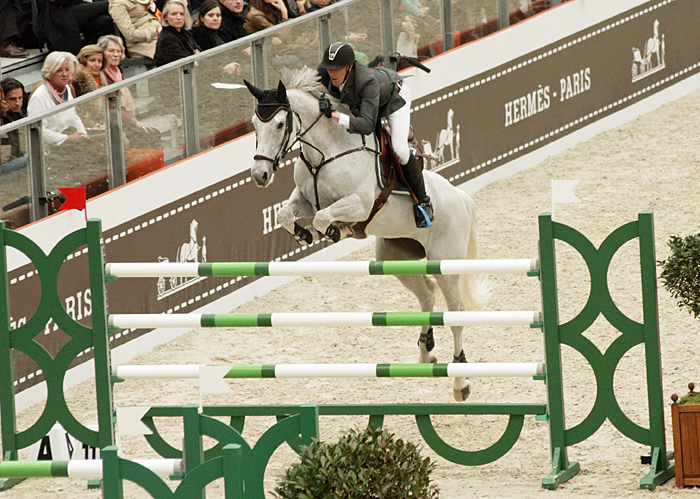
Kevin Staut at the 2012 Saut Hermès.

The Saut Hermès is an annual show jumping competition held at the Grand Palais in Paris, France. It is sponsored by the fashion company Hermès.

== Winners ==
- 2010: Marcus Ehning
- 2011: Christian Ahlamnn
- 2012: Katharina Offel
- 2013: Ludger Beerbaum
- 2014: Marcus Ehning
- 2015: Romain Duguet
- 2016: Abdelkebir Ouaddar
- 2017: Edwina Tops-Alexander
- 2018: Simon Delestre
- 2019: Simon Delestre
- 2022: Kevin Staut
- 2023: Victor Bettendorf
- 2024: Julien Anquetin
- 2025: Simon Delestre
