= Poetin =

Dressage horse

- Breed: Brandenburger
- Sire: Sandro Hit (Oldenburg)
- Grandsire: Sandro Song (Oldenburg)
- Dam: Poesie (Brandenburger)
- Maternal grandsire: Brentano II (Hanoverian)
- Sex: Mare
- Foaled: 1997
- Country: Germany
- Colour: Dark bay, sock near hind
- Owner: Haras de Hus (farm owned by Xavier Marie)

Poetin (1997 - December 2005) was a world-class dressage horse that was the 2003 World Young Dressage Horse Champion in the six-year-old division, and sold for a record amount at the PSI Auction in Germany.

== Breeding ==
Poetin was of excellent bloodlines, sired by Sandro Hit, the Winner of 1999 six-year-old Dressage World Championships and German Bundeschampionate. Her dam, Poesie, was by the 2003 Hanoverian Stallion of the Year, Brentano II.

Pedigree for Poetin
1997 Dark bay filly

Pedigree of Poetin
Sire Sandro Hit blk. 1993 Oldenburg	Sandro Song blk. 1988; Oldenburg	Sandro dkb/br. 1974; Holsteiner	Sacramento Song
Sire Sandro Hit blk. 1993 Oldenburg	Sandro Song blk. 1988; Oldenburg	Sandro dkb/br. 1974; Holsteiner	Duerte
Sire Sandro Hit blk. 1993 Oldenburg	Sandro Song blk. 1988; Oldenburg	Antenne II; 1984; Oldenburg	Gepard
Sire Sandro Hit blk. 1993 Oldenburg	Sandro Song blk. 1988; Oldenburg	Antenne II; 1984; Oldenburg	Antenne
Sire Sandro Hit blk. 1993 Oldenburg	Loretta blk/br. 1987; Oldenburg	Ramino blk/br. 1980; Westphalian	Ramiro Z
Sire Sandro Hit blk. 1993 Oldenburg	Loretta blk/br. 1987; Oldenburg	Ramino blk/br. 1980; Westphalian	Dombuche
Sire Sandro Hit blk. 1993 Oldenburg	Loretta blk/br. 1987; Oldenburg	Lassie; 1983; Oldenburg	Welt As
Sire Sandro Hit blk. 1993 Oldenburg	Loretta blk/br. 1987; Oldenburg	Lassie; 1983; Oldenburg	Lucie
Dam Poesie ch. 1992 Berlin Brandenburg	Brentano II ch. 1983; Hanoverian	Bolero ch. 1975; Hanoverian	Black Sky
Dam Poesie ch. 1992 Berlin Brandenburg	Brentano II ch. 1983; Hanoverian	Bolero ch. 1975; Hanoverian	Baronesse
Dam Poesie ch. 1992 Berlin Brandenburg	Brentano II ch. 1983; Hanoverian	Glocke br. 1973; Hanoverian	Grande
Dam Poesie ch. 1992 Berlin Brandenburg	Brentano II ch. 1983; Hanoverian	Glocke br. 1973; Hanoverian	Ferbel
Dam Poesie ch. 1992 Berlin Brandenburg	Primadonna ch. 1988; Berlin Brandenburg	Gotland br. 1981; Hanoverian	Goldstein
Dam Poesie ch. 1992 Berlin Brandenburg	Primadonna ch. 1988; Berlin Brandenburg	Gotland br. 1981; Hanoverian	Pipeline
Dam Poesie ch. 1992 Berlin Brandenburg	Primadonna ch. 1988; Berlin Brandenburg	Parabiose; 1984; Berlin Brandenburg	Sekurit
Dam Poesie ch. 1992 Berlin Brandenburg	Primadonna ch. 1988; Berlin Brandenburg	Parabiose; 1984; Berlin Brandenburg	Parabel II

== Dressage career ==
Poetin had a short-lived career as a dressage horse. Her first great success was in 2000, when she won the Bundeschampion as a three-year-old with rider Heinz-Heinrich Meyer zu Strohen. There she received a 9.0 for her excellent conformation, an 8.5 for her walk, which did not score as well because she could get tense, a 9.0 for her trot, and a 9.0 for her uphill canter. She was also Bundeschampion as a five-year-old in 2002.

Perhaps her greatest fame, however, came from her spectacular performance at the 2003 World Young Dressage Horse Championship. Winning the six-year-old division, she completed the competition with a score of '10' for her amazing trot .

== Ownership ==
The mare was originally owned by the Berlin/Brandeburg State Stud.

Following the Championships, Poetin was sold at the 2003 PSI Auction for a record 2.5 million Euros. The bidding between 10 parties started at 100,000 Euros, and eventually resulted in a purchase by Peter and Patty van der Zwan of stable De Keizershoeve in Kessel, Netherlands, and the ING Bank, for use as a brood mare. Her price was twice as much as the previous auction record of 2.8 million Deutsch Marks.

However, a financial dispute between the van der Zwans and ING Bank forced auction of many of the couple's horses. To prevent her sale, the van der Zwans hid the mare, and an investigation ensued. Combined efforts by a team of detectives and the Dutch federal police eventually found Poetin on August 25, 2005, at an equine clinic in Kerken, Germany, where she was being officially treated for 'irritation of the right front tendon sheath.'

Poetin was returned to the Estate Balkenschoten in Nijkerk, Netherlands, to be auctioned off by Cees Lubbers Auctioneers on September 1, 2005. Although she appeared tender at the walk, the mare still showed her brilliant trot and lovely canter work and flying changes. The bidding included the likes of German Grand Prix rider Gina Capellmann Lutkemeier, who stopped her bidding at 700,000 euro, but the eight-year-old Brandenburger was finally purchased for 900,000 Euros by Xavier Marie, owner of Haras de Hus, a stud farm in France.

Also sold at the auction was A Special Poetin (by Jazz), the first embryo transfer foal of Poetin. The beautiful black filly was bought back by Peter van der Zwan via an agent. Following in her mother's hoofprints, she was sold for a record price of 138,000 Euros — the highest price ever for a warmblood foal bought in auction.

Poetin was also bred in 2000 to Dormello, the 1999 Oldenburg Stallion licensing Champion, but had a miscarriage.

== Death ==
On September 3, 2005, Poetin was shipped to Petit Mars, France, to her new home at Haras de Hus. As soon as she arrived, however, it was clear that she was showing signs of severe laminitis in both front feet, as she was having trouble standing up due to the pain.

Aggressive treatment was begun by French and German veterinarians, including the use of a sling to hold the mare up and help relieve pressure on her feet. But the laminitis soon worsened, and the mare began to shed her hooves. Realizing there was little chance of recovery, it was decided to put the mare down. On December 13, 2005, Poetin was humanely euthanized at Haras de Hus.

== Resulting Lawsuit ==
After the mare was euthanized, it was discovered that she had been treated with corticosteroids prior to and during the time of the auction. She also wore therapeutic shoes prior to the auction, and was only walked on soft ground.

Apparently, the mare's caretakers knew that she did not simply have a mild irritation to the sesamoid, as stated at the auction, but a tendon infection that was causing lameness. Use of the steroids not only masked the lameness, but likely caused the laminitis that the mare suffered from, a possible negative side effect of using steroids. Most agree that, considering her condition, riding her in the auction and shipping her to France (a journey more than 10 hours long) could be considered inhumane.

The final owner of Poetin, Xavier Marie, is now suing ING Bank. He is mainly basing his case on the fact that the use of corticosteroids were kept secret at the sale, which is illegal in Europe, and that he was never told the true condition of the mare at the sale. In May 2006, Judge Poelmann, the judge for the case, ordered ING Bank to provide Marie access with the medical files of Poetin. They found that, indeed, Celestovet (which contains the corticosteriod Betametazon) was given to the mare prior to sale.

== Cloning ==
Poetin was cloned by Marie, with the purpose being to preserve her genetic code. The resulting filly was foaled March 30, 2007, and now lives at Haras de Hus.
