= FEI World Cup Jumping 2016/2017 =

Sports event

The 2016–17 FEI Show Jumping World Cup is an annual international competition among the upper level of show jumping horses and riders for the 2016–17 season. The final was held in Omaha, Nebraska, United States, in the week of 27 March–2 April 2017. The Scheduled Prize Money is €680,000.
