= Westercelle =

- Stadtteil of Celle
- Coat of arms
- Interactive map of Westercelle
- Location within Germany Location within Lower Saxony
- Coordinates: 52°36′15″N 10°04′44″E
- Country: Germany
- State: Lower Saxony
- District: Celle
- Town: Celle
- Elevation: 40 m (130 ft)

Population (2020-12-31)
  - Total: 6,845
- Time zone: UTC+01:00 (CET)
  - Summer (DST): UTC+02:00 (CEST)
- Postal codes: 29227
- Dialling codes: 05141

Westercelle is a suburb of the district town of Celle in Lower Saxony, Germany, that lies 3 kilometres (1.9 miles) south of the town centre on the river Fuhse.

== History ==
The village derives its name from its location west of the original settlement of Celle, now called Altencelle ("Old Celle"). The first houses were built on the banks of the river. Westercelle developed into a purely agricultural, relatively large village with farms on both sides of the road running from Celle south towards Hanover, which later became the B 3 federal road. Individual farmsteads still exist in the suburb. In 1974 the village was incorporated into the town of Celle.

=== Religion ===
The mother church of the Lutheran parish of Westercelle is the Christ Church (Christuskirche).

== Politics ==
The chair of the local council (Ortsbürgermeister) is Kathrin Fündeling.

=== Coat of arms ===
The green shield of the village coat of arms is divided diagonally from top left by a wavy white line that symbolises the river Fuhse. Above is a white horses' head, below a white lime tree leaf.

== Economy and infrastructure ==
=== Road ===
Since the 1970s industry and commerce has settled in the new trading estates sited in favourable locations next to the B 3. The trading estates include Street One and trispel. Following completion of the second section of the eastern ring road in 2011 Westercelle should be relieved of its heavy through traffic.

=== Rail ===
The Deutsche Bahn (DB)'s S-Bahn line from Celle via Burgdorf and Lehrte to Hanover runs towards the west through this part of Celle. The nearest station is Celle (occasional Intercityexpress, InterCity and S-Bahn trains).

=== Bus ===
The town's bus lines: nos. 1 (Westercelle-Celle-Vorwerk-Garßen), 6 (Westercelle-Celle-Hafen-Neustadt-Neustädter Holz) and 7 (Gewerbegebiet Westercelle-Westercelle-Celle) stop in Westercelle. In addition there are regional bus lines 1-15 (Westercelle-Celle-Vorwerk-Groß Hehlen-Bergen), 1-45 (Westercelle-Celle-Vorwerk-Garßen-Lachendorf), 6-65 (Eicklingen-Wathlingen-Nienhagen-Adelheidsdorf-Westercelle-Celle), 6-85 (Westercelle-Celle-Hafen-Neustadt-Hambühren-Südwinsen-Wietze) and 7-75 (Nienhorst-Adelheidsdorf-Großmoor-Dasselsbruch-Gewerbegebiet Westercelle-Westercelle-Celle). The bus network is run by the Celle bus company, CeBus.

=== Education ===
In Westercelle there are three general educational schools: two primary schools (Bruchhagen and Nadelberg) and the secondary school (Realschule). The Jugenddorf Westercelle is a youth centre.

== Culture and points of interest ==
- Westercelle has an open-air swimming pool that is no longer run by the town, but by a private company.
- The river meadows of the Fuhse are worth seeing.

=== Sport ===
Westercelle has a shooting club, founded in 1644, a sports club, Vfl Westercelle, which was formed in 1950 and a riding and driving club on the Trift.

=== Regular events ===
- Schützenfest

== Personalities ==
- Edmund Rehwinkel (1899–1977), politician specialising in agriculture and farmer's representative

== Sources ==
- Artur Müller-Davidi: Westercelle: Hinweise für die Erforschung der Geschichte des Dorfes. Celle, 1981
- Horst Bolle: Chronik des Dorfes Westercelle. Celle, 1951
