= Pénélope Leprevost =

French equestrian

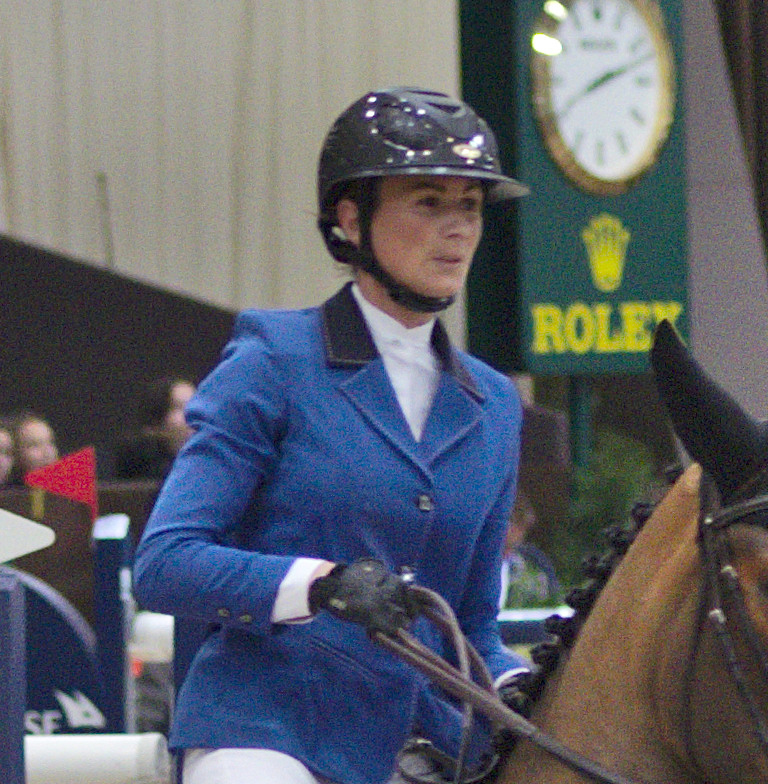
- Leprevost in 2013

Personal information
- Born: 1 August 1980 (age 46) Rouen, France
- Height: 175 cm (5 ft 9 in)
- Weight: 55 kg (121 lb)

Sport
- Sport: Show jumping
- Club: Jump Normand
- Coached by: Philippe Guerdat (national); Michel Robert (personal); Henri Prudent (personal)
Medal record
Representing France
Olympic Games
Gold medal – first place	2016 Rio de Janeiro	Team jumping
World Championships
Silver medal – second place	2010 Kentucky	Team jumping
Silver medal – second place	2014 Normandy	Team jumping
European Championships
Silver medal – second place	2011 Madrid	Team jumping
World Cup
Silver medal – second place	2015 Las Vegas	Individual jumping

Pénélope Leprevost (born 1 August 1980) is a French equestrian who competes in the sport of show jumping. At the 2012 Summer Olympics, Leprevost placed 12th with the French team on Mylord Carthago*HN. She won a team gold medal at the 2016 Summer Olympics.

== Personal life ==
Leprevost started competing in horse riding at the age of six. She boards her horses at a stable near Lisieux, and owns the company Penelope Boutique, which specializes in horse tack and equestrian supplies. She is a single mother, and her parents moved next to her home to help to raise her daughter Eden Blin Lebreton when her mother is away on competitions.

== International Championship Results ==
Results
Year	Event	Horse	Placing	Notes
2010	World Young Horse Championships	Andora Z	23rd	7 Year Old
2010	World Cup Final	Mylord Carthago	24th	
2010	World Equestrian Games	Mylord Carthago	2nd place, silver medalist(s)	Team
2010	World Equestrian Games	Mylord Carthago	22nd	Individual
2011	European Championships	Mylord Carthago	2nd place, silver medalist(s)	Team
2011	European Championships	Mylord Carthago	7th	Individual
2012	Olympic Games	Mylord Carthago	12th	Team
2012	Olympic Games	Mylord Carthago	50th	Individual
2013	World Cup Final	Nayana	24th	
2014	World Equestrian Games	Flora de Mariposa	2nd place, silver medalist(s)	Team
2014	World Equestrian Games	Flora de Mariposa	29th	Individual
2015	World Cup Final	Vagabond de la Pomme	2nd place, silver medalist(s)	
2015	European Championships	Flora de Mariposa	5th	Team
2015	European Championships	Flora de Mariposa	4th	Individual
2016	World Cup Final	Vagabond de la Pomme	8th	
2016	Olympic Games	Flora de Mariposa	1st place, gold medalist(s)	Team
2016	Olympic Games	Flora de Mariposa	EL	Individual
2017	European Championships	Vagabond de la Pomme	7th	Team
2017	European Championships	Vagabond de la Pomme	34th	Individual
EL = Eliminated; RET = Retired; WD = Withdrew

== See also ==
- Flora de Mariposa
