= Popeye K =

Show horse

- Breed: Dutch Warmblood
- Discipline: Hunt seat
- Sire: Voltaire
- Dam: Eloretta
- Maternal grandsire: Ronald
- Sex: Stallion
- Foaled: May 22, 1997
- Color: Bay, four socks and blaze
- Breeder: Peter Karneef
- Owner: Rachael and Elizabeth Spencet
- Trainer: Tommy Serio

Popeye K was a 17.1 hands (69 inches, 175 cm) Dutch Warmblood stallion that competed on the "A" circuit in show hunter classes.

== Breeding ==
Popeye K was bred in Ashton, Ontario at Ashland farm. Popeye K is by the great show jumper Voltaire, who has produced several offspring that compete at the international level or are excellent sires themselves, including Finesse, Helios, Play it Again, Altair, and Concorde. The dam of Popeye K includes the great show jumper and sire Ramiro Z, who was the leading sire of jumpers in the world throughout much of the 1990s, and who produced the likes of Ratina Z, Zamira, and Donau.

Pedigree for Popeye K
1997 Bay colt

Pedigree of Popeye K
Sire Voltaire br. 1979 HANOVERIAN	Furioso II drk ch. 1965; ANGLO NORMAN	Furioso br. 1939	Precipitation
Sire Voltaire br. 1979 HANOVERIAN	Furioso II drk ch. 1965; ANGLO NORMAN	Furioso br. 1939	Maureen
Sire Voltaire br. 1979 HANOVERIAN	Furioso II drk ch. 1965; ANGLO NORMAN	Dame de Ranvil; ~1955	Talisman
Sire Voltaire br. 1979 HANOVERIAN	Furioso II drk ch. 1965; ANGLO NORMAN	Dame de Ranvil; ~1955	Que Je Suis Belle
Sire Voltaire br. 1979 HANOVERIAN	Gogo Moeve br. 1975; HANOVERIAN	Gotthard gr. 1949	Goldfisch II
Sire Voltaire br. 1979 HANOVERIAN	Gogo Moeve br. 1975; HANOVERIAN	Gotthard gr. 1949	Ampa
Sire Voltaire br. 1979 HANOVERIAN	Gogo Moeve br. 1975; HANOVERIAN	Mosaik blk. 1966	More Magic
Sire Voltaire br. 1979 HANOVERIAN	Gogo Moeve br. 1975; HANOVERIAN	Mosaik blk. 1966	Erich Stute
Dam Elortetta DUTCH WARMBLOOD	Ronald br. 1970; HOLSTEINER	Ramiro br. 1965	Raimond
Dam Elortetta DUTCH WARMBLOOD	Ronald br. 1970; HOLSTEINER	Ramiro br. 1965	Valine
Dam Elortetta DUTCH WARMBLOOD	Ronald br. 1970; HOLSTEINER	Adrette b. 1964	Heilbutt
Dam Elortetta DUTCH WARMBLOOD	Ronald br. 1970; HOLSTEINER	Adrette b. 1964	Dorette*
Dam Elortetta DUTCH WARMBLOOD	Sanremo; DUTCH WARMBLOOD	Farn drk b/br 1959	Fax I
Dam Elortetta DUTCH WARMBLOOD	Sanremo; DUTCH WARMBLOOD	Farn drk b/br 1959	Dorette*
Dam Elortetta DUTCH WARMBLOOD	Sanremo; DUTCH WARMBLOOD	V Gypsy	unknown
Dam Elortetta DUTCH WARMBLOOD	Sanremo; DUTCH WARMBLOOD	V Gypsy	unknown

* Popeye K is inbred 4D × 4D to the mare Dorette, meaning that she appears twice fourth generation on the dam side of his pedigree.

== Show career ==
Popeye K began training in 1999, before attempting his Canadian Warmblood testing in September 2001 during which he finished Reserve Champion. In 2002, Popeye K was shipped down to Ocala, Florida to begin his show career, where he competed in the Pre-Green Hunters. The following year he was sent to Virginia to train with the great hunter rider Tommy Serio, before continuing his show career.

Popeye K has had great success in the show ring. He was named the Horse of the Year Green Conformation Hunter by the United States Equestrian Federation in 2004, and in 2005 was named Show Hunter of the Year by The Chronicle of the Horse magazine. In both 2005 and 2006 he was named the Reserve Horse of the Year by the USEF and the Regular Conformation Hunter of the Year by the Show Hunter Hall of Fame. In 2005, 2006 and 2007, he was named the Winter Equestrian Festival Circuit Champion in the Regular Conformation Hunter division. He is known for his jumping ability and great temperament.

== Breeding career ==
Popeye K has several hundred offspring. He continually passes on his exceptional conformation, lovely movement, and powerful, correct jump, as well as flashy markings.

== Results ==
2000

- Stallion Performance Test (as a Show Hunter):

- 79.5% total

- Conformation: 82%

- Movement: 78.5%

- Type: 77%

- Received a “10” for scope and technique in the course jumping

- Winner of the Governor General's Cup at the Royal Agricultural Winter Fair
- 2nd Lieutenant Governor's Cup

2003

- West Palm Beach: last place for the circuit in the Green Conformation Hunters
- Pennsylvania National Horse Show: Reserve Champion
- Washington International Horse Show: Reserve Champion
- National Leader in the Green Conformation Division

2004

- United States Equestrian Federation Green Conformation Hunter Champion
- PHR National Silver Stirrup (Green Working Hunter Champion)
- Reserve Champion WEF Circuit
- Winner WCHR Alabama Clay Conformation Hunter award

2005

- Regular Conformation Hunter Champion at the Winter Equestrian Festival
