= Romain Duguet =

Swiss show jumping rider (born 1980)

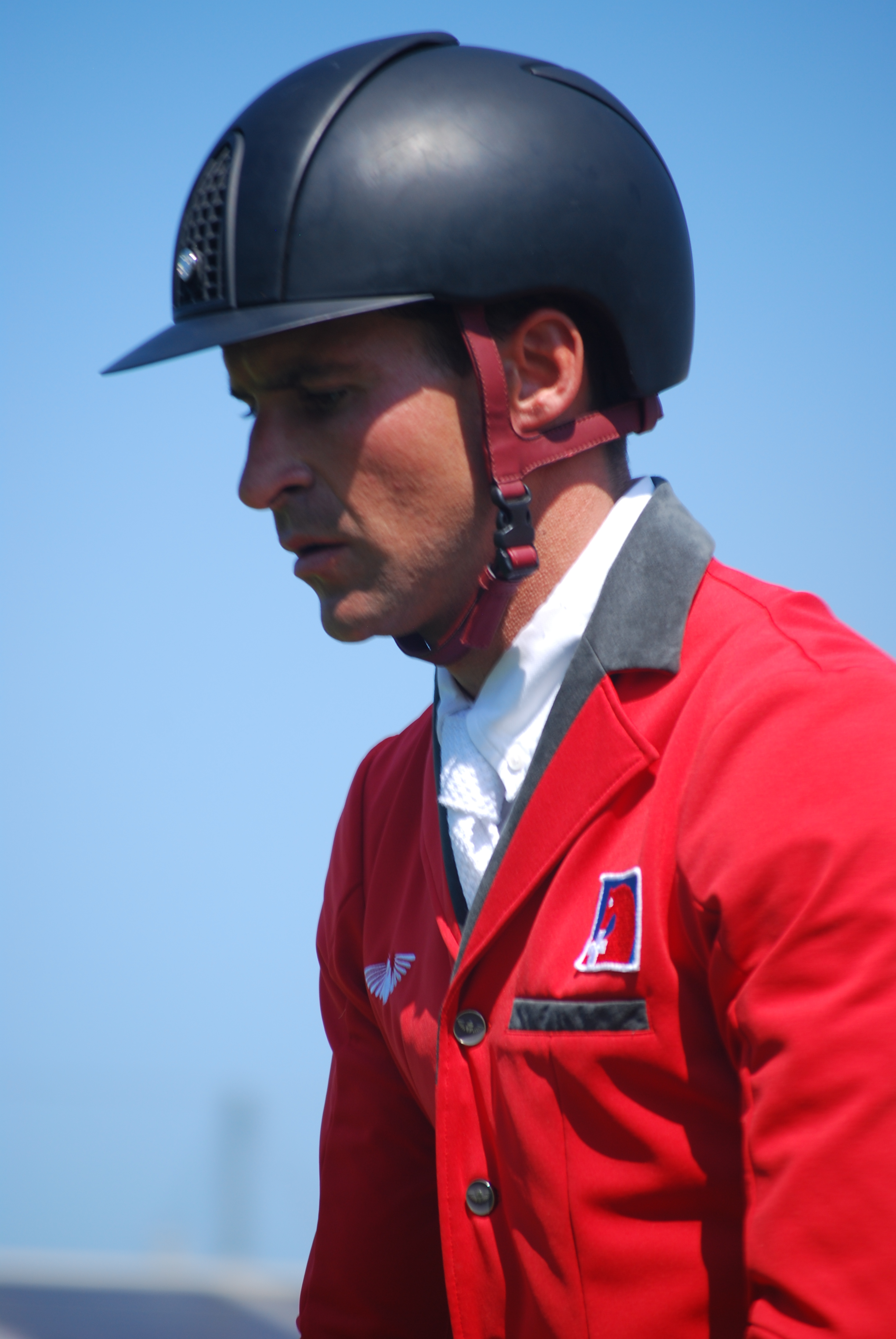

Personal information
- Born: 7 October 1980 (age 45)
- Height: 1.76 m (5 ft 9 in)
- Weight: 68 kg (150 lb)

Sport
- Country: Switzerland
- Sport: Jumping
Medal record
Equestrian
Representing Switzerland
European Championships
Bronze medal – third place	2015 Aachen	Team jumping
Bronze medal – third place	2017 Gothenburg	Team jumping
World Cup
Silver medal – second place	2017 Omaha	Individual jumping

Romain Duguet (born 7 October 1980) is a Swiss Olympic show jumping rider. He competed at the 2016 Summer Olympics in Rio de Janeiro, Brazil, where he finished 6th in the team and 32nd in the individual competition.

Duguet competed at the 2015 European Championships where he won a team bronze and placed 11th individually. He also participated at two editions of the Show Jumping World Cup finals (in 2016 and 2017), with his biggest success coming in 2017 when he finished in the runner-up position behind McLain Ward.

== See also ==
- Quorida de Treho
