= Individual jumping at the 2006 World Equestrian Games =

The individual jumping competition at the 2006 FEI World Equestrian Games was held between August 29 and September 3, 2006.

== Medalists ==
Gold	Silver	Bronze
(Belgium) Jos Lansink (Cavalor Cumano)	(United States) Beezie Madden (Authentic)	(Germany) Meredith Michaels-Beerbaum (Shutterfly)

== Complete results ==
Rider and horse were eliminated from further competition.

Rider and horse did not qualify for the next round.

Rider chose not to compete in the next round. These riders were placed in order of point total starting after those eliminated in round 2B.

=== Round 1 ===
The first round of the individual jumping competition was held on August 29, 2006. It was a speed class.

	Rider	Horse	Time (s)	Faults	Total time (s)	Points
1	(United States) Beezie Madden	Authentic	77.62	0	77.62	0.000
2	(Canada) Eric Lamaze	Hickstead	78.40	0	78.40	0.390
3	(Netherlands) Gerco Schröder	Eurocommerce Berlin	78.47	0	78.47	0.425
4	(United States) McLain Ward	Sapphire	79.35	0	79.35	0.865
5	(France) Laurent Goffinet	Flipper d'Elle HN	79.42	0	79.42	0.900
6	(Spain) Sergio Alvarez Moya	Le Rève du Nabab	80.09	0	80.09	1.235
7	(Brazil) Bernardo Alves	Canturo	80.33	0	80.33	1.355
8	(Brazil) Cassio Rivetti	Olona	80.40	0	80.40	1.390
9	(Republic of Ireland) Marie Burke	Chippison	81.04	0	81.04	1.710
10	(Ukraine) Grégory Wathelet	Loriot	81.14	0	81.14	1.760
11	(Norway) Geir Gulliksen	Cattani	81.30	0	81.30	1.840
12	(Bulgaria) Samantha McIntosh	Loxley	81.65	0	81.65	2.015
13	(Belgium) Ludo Philippaerts	Parco	77.71	4	81.71	2.045
14	(Australia) Edwina Alexander	Isovlas Pialotta	78.09	4	82.09	2.235
15	(Ukraine) Jean-Claude Van Geenberghe	Osta Rugs Tresor	78.37	4	82.37	2.375
16	(Austria) Jürgen Krackow	Looping	78.45	4	82.45	2.415
17	(Netherlands) Albert Zoer	Okidoki	82.58	0	82.58	2.480
18	(Italy) Emilio Bicocchi	Jeckerson Kapitol d'Argonne	82.95	0	82.95	2.665
19	(Germany) Ludger Beerbaum	L'Espoir	83.01	0	83.01	2.695
20	(Belgium) Dirk Demeersman	Clinton	79.13	4	83.13	2.755
21	(Sweden) Royne Zetterman	Isaac	83.77	0	83.77	3.075
22	(Netherlands) Jeroen Dubbeldam	BMC Up and Down	83.82	0	83.82	3.100
23	(Spain) Ricardo Jurado	Procasa le Monde	84.16	0	84.16	3.270
24	(Germany) Marcus Ehning	Noltes Küchengirl	76.70	8	84.70	3.540
25	(Denmark) Tina Lund	Carola	80.84	4	84.84	3.610
26	(Colombia) Carlos Lopez	Instit	84.86	0	84.86	3.620
27	(Switzerland) Niklaus Schurtenberger	Cantus	84.89	0	84.89	3.635
28	(United Kingdom) John Whitaker	Peppermill	84.98	0	84.98	3.680
29	(Venezuela) Pablo Barrios	Sun God	81.43	4	85.43	3.905
30	(Germany) Meredith Michaels-Beerbaum	Shutterfly	81.46	4	85.46	3.920
31	(Republic of Ireland) Shane Breen	World Cruise	81.59	4	85.59	3.985
32	(Germany) Christian Ahlmann	Cöster	81.62	4	85.62	4.000
33	(Netherlands) Piet Raymakers	Van Schijndel's Curtis	85.71	0	85.71	4.045
34	(France) Michel Robert	Galet d'Auzay	81.78	4	85.78	4.080
35	(Portugal) Luciana Diniz	Dover	81.94	4	85.94	4.160
36	(Brazil) Álvaro Alfonso de Miranda Neto	Nike	82.09	4	86.09	4.235
37	(Switzerland) Werner Muff	Plot Blue	83.07	4	87.07	4.725
38	(Argentina) Max Amaya	Church Road	87.20	0	87.20	4.790
39	(Sweden) Rolf-Göran Bengtsson	Ninja la Silla	83.44	4	87.44	4.910
40	(Belgium) Jos Lansink	Cavalor Cumano	83.63	4	87.63	5.005
41	(Spain) Jesus Garmendia Echeverria	Maddock	80.29	8	88.29	5.335
42	(Republic of Ireland) Cameron Hanley	Siec Hippica Kerman	84.37	4	88.37	5.375
43	(France) Hervé Godignon	Obélix	84.42	4	88.42	5.400
44	(Finland) Sebastian Numminen	Sails Away	84.53	4	88.53	5.455
45	(Colombia) Manuel Torres	Chambacunero	80.56	8	88.56	5.470
46	(United Kingdom) Michael Whitaker	Insul Tech Portofino	84.67	4	88.67	5.525
47	(United Kingdom) Tim Gredley	Omelli	81.00	8	89.00	5.690
48	(United States) Laura Kraut	Miss Independent	85.57	4	89.57	5.975
49	(Canada) Jill Henselwood	Special Ed	85.95	4	89.95	6.165
50	(Austria) Roland Englbrecht	Nip Armani	86.06	4	90.06	6.220
51	(Greece) Antonis Petris	Gredo la Daviere	82.22	8	90.22	6.300
52	(Austria) Gerfried Puck	11th Bleeker	82.43	8	90.43	6.405
53	(Finland) Mikael Forsten	BMC's Skybreaker	86.49	4	90.49	6.435
54	(Switzerland) Christina Liebherr	L.B. No Mercy	82.66	8	90.66	6.520
55	(Austria) Stefan Eder	Cartier PSG	82.69	8	90.69	6.535
56	(Switzerland) Beat Mändli	Indigo IX	83.18	8	91.18	6.780
57	(Argentina) Ricardo Kierkegaard	Rey Z	83.23	8	91.23	6.805
58	(Hungary) James Wingrave	Agropoint Calira	83.33	8	91.33	6.855
59	(Ukraine) Björn Nagel	Pilgrim	83.67	8	91.67	7.025
60	(Japan) Taizo Sugitani	Obelix	87.68	4	91.68	7.030
61	(Norway) Tony Andre Hansen	Camiro	88.11	4	92.11	7.245
62	(Belgium) Judy-Ann Melchoir	Grande Dame Z	88.24	4	92.24	7.310
63	(Sweden) Maria Gretzer	Spender S	84.39	8	92.39	7.385
64	(Ukraine) Katharina Offel	Atlanta	84.46	8	92.46	7.420
65	(Poland) Krzyszlof Ludwiczak	HOF Schretstakens Quamiro	88.54	4	92.54	7.460
66	(Spain) Manuel Fernandez Saro	Quin Chin	84.55	8	92.55	7.465
67	(Mexico) Marcela Lobo	Joskin	88.82	4	92.82	7.600
68	(Republic of Ireland) Billy Twomey	Luidam	84.85	8	92.85	7.615
69	(United Kingdom) Nick Skelton	Russel	84.89	8	92.89	7.635
70	(Russia) Vladimir Beletskiy	Rezonanz	89.07	4	93.07	7.725
71	(Italy) Giuseppe Rolli	Jericho de la Vie	89.44	4	93.44	7.910
72	(France) Florian Angot	First de Launay	81.73	12	93.73	8.055
73	(Argentina) Jose Larocca	Svante	86.00	8	94.00	8.190
74	(Czech Republic) Jiri Papousek	La Manche T	90.50	4	94.50	8.440
75	(Portugal) Antonio Portela Carneiro	Echo de Lessay	90.75	4	94.75	8.565
76	(Saudi Arabia) Abdullah Al-Sharbatly	Hugo Gesmeray	78.79	16	94.79	8.585
77	(Estonia) Hanno Ellermann	Poncorde	86.82	8	94.82	8.600
78	(Russia) Gennadiy Gashiboyazov	Papirus	82.99	12	94.99	8.685
79	(Italy) Juan Carlos García	Loro Piana Albin III	91.66	4	95.66	9.020
80	(Canada) Ian Millar	In Style	84.36	12	96.36	9.370
81	(Mexico) Federico Fernandez	Bohemio	80.84	16	96.84	9.610
82	(Jordan) Ibrahim Hani Kamal Bisharat	Qwinto	89.14	8	97.14	9.760
83	(Malaysia) Syed Omar Almohdzar	Lui	89.26	8	97.26	9.820
84	(Saudi Arabia) H.H. Prince Faisal Al-Shalan	Uthago	90.03	8	98.03	10.205
85	(Estonia) Gunnar Klettenberg	Novesta	90.86	8	98.86	10.620
86	(Argentina) Guillermo Obligado	Carlson	92.71	8	100.71	11.545
87	(Colombia) René Lopez	Isky	88.97	12	100.97	11.675
88	(United States) Margie Engle	Hidden Creek's Quervo Gold	85.75	16	101.75	12.065
89	(Australia) Rod Brown	Mr. Burns	86.22	16	102.22	12.300
90	(Mexico) Alberto Michan	Chinobampo Lavita	86.28	16	102.28	12.330
91	(Italy) Jonella Ligresti	Quinta 27	90.35	12	102.35	12.365
92	(Finland) Noora Pentti	Evli Cagliostro	90.53	12	102.53	12.455
93	(United Arab Emirates) Mohammed Al-Kumaiti	Al-Mutawakel	90.60	12	102.60	12.490
94	(Japan) Yuko Itakura	Portvliet	86.93	16	102.93	12.655
95	(Libya) Fabrice Lyon	Jasmine du Perron	95.14	8	103.14	12.760
96	(Hungary) Zsolt Pirik	Havanna	91.72	12	103.72	13.050
97	(Saudi Arabia) Kamal Bahamdan	Campus	92.00	12	104.00	13.190
98	(Russia) Vladimir Panchenko	Lanteno	94.54	12	106.54	14.460
99	(New Zealand) Grant Wilson	Up and Down Cellebroedersbos	87.29	20	107.29	14.835
100	(Australia) Peter McMahon	Kolora Stud Genoa	104.01	4	108.01	15.195
101	(Canada) Chris Pratt	Rivendell	104.06	4	108.06	15.220
102	(Mexico) Ariana Azcarraga	Sambo	97.51	12	109.51	15.945
103	(Egypt) Karim El-Zoghby	Baragway	94.34	16	110.34	16.360
104	(South Africa) Roger Hessen	Quito	96.44	16	112.44	17.410
105	(Japan) Eiken Sato	Cayak DH	89.54	24	113.54	17.960
106	(Czech Republic) Veronika Macanova	Pompos	105.99	8	113.99	18.185
107	(Czech Republic) Ondrej Nagr	Atlas	105.35	12	117.35	19.865
108	(Greece) Emmanouela Athanassiades	Rimini Z	106.38	20	126.38	24.380
109	(Czech Republic) Zdenek Zila	Pinot Grigio	117.69	12	129.69	26.035
110	(Sweden) Malin Baryard-Johnsson	Butterfly Flip	Refusal			46.035
110	(Saudi Arabia) H.R.H. Prince Abdullah Al-Soud	Allah Jabek	Refusal			46.035
110	(Australia) Jamie Kermond	Stylish King	Refusal			46.035
110	(El Salvador) Jose Alfredo Hernandez Ortega	Semtex P	Refusal			46.035
114	(South Africa) Barry Taylor	Duxy	Fall			46.035
114	(Hungary) Mariann Hugyecz	Superville	Fall			46.035
114	(Denmark) Thomas Velin	Godsend du Reverdy	Retired			46.035

=== Round 2 ===
==== A ====
Part A of the second round of the individual jumping competition was held on August 30, 2006.

	Rider	Horse	Faults	Round 1 Points	Total
1	(United States) Beezie Madden	Authentic	0	0.000	0.000
2	(Canada) Eric Lamaze	Hickstead	0	0.390	0.390
3	(Netherlands) Gerco Schröder	Eurocommerce Berlin	0	0.425	0.425
4	(Brazil) Bernardo Alves	Canturo	0	1.355	1.355
5	(Australia) Edwina Alexander	Isovlas Pialotta	0	2.235	2.235
6	(Ukraine) Jean-Claude Van Geenberghe	Osta Rugs Tresor	0	2.375	2.375
7	(Netherlands) Albert Zoer	Okidoki	0	2.480	2.480
8	(Germany) Ludger Beerbaum	L'Espoir	0	2.695	2.695
9	(Spain) Ricardo Jurado	Procasa le Monde	0	3.270	3.270
10	(Republic of Ireland) Shane Breen	World Cruise	0	3.985	3.985
11	(Netherlands) Jeroen Dubbeldam	BMC Up and Down	1	3.100	4.100
12	(Portugal) Luciana Diniz	Dover	0	4.160	4.160
13	(Switzerland) Niklaus Schurtenberger	Cantus	1	3.635	4.635
14	(United States) McLain Ward	Sapphire	4	0.865	4.865
15	(Germany) Meredith Michaels-Beerbaum	Shutterfly	1	3.920	4.920
16	(Belgium) Jos Lansink	Cavalor Cumano	0	5.005	5.005
17	(Spain) Sergio Alvarez Moya	Le Rève du Nabab	4	1.235	5.235
18	(Brazil) Cassio Rivetti	Olona	4	1.390	5.390
19	(Republic of Ireland) Marie Burke	Chippison	4	1.710	5.710
20	(Norway) Geir Gulliksen	Cattani	4	1.840	5.840
21	(Belgium) Ludo Philippaerts	Parco	4	2.045	6.045
22	(Austria) Jürgen Krackow	Looping	4	2.415	6.415
23	(Switzerland) Christina Liebherr	L.B. No Mercy	0	6.520	6.520
24	(United Kingdom) Michael Whitaker	Insul Tech Portofino	1	5.525	6.525
25	(Bulgaria) Samantha McIntosh	Loxley	5	2.015	7.015
26	(Japan) Taizo Sugitani	Obelix	0	7.030	7.030
27	(Sweden) Royne Zetterman	Isaac	4	3.075	7.075
28	(Germany) Marcus Ehning	Noltes Küchengirl	4	3.540	7.540
29	(Ukraine) Björn Nagel	Pilgrim	1	7.025	8.025
30	(France) Michel Robert	Galet d'Auzay	4	4.080	8.080
31	(Ukraine) Katharina Offel	Atlanta	1	7.420	8.420
32	(United Kingdom) Nick Skelton	Russel	1	7.635	8.635
33	(United Kingdom) John Whitaker	Peppermill	5	3.680	8.680
34	(Venezuela) Pablo Barrios	Sun God	5	3.905	8.905
35	(Sweden) Rolf-Göran Bengtsson	Ninja la Silla	4	4.910	8.910
36	(Netherlands) Piet Raymakers	Van Schijndel's Curtis	5	4.045	9.045
37	(France) Hervé Godignon	Obélix	4	5.400	9.400
38	(Switzerland) Werner Muff	Plot Blue	5	4.725	9.725
39	(Jordan) Ibrahim Hani Kamal Bisharat	Qwinto	0	9.760	9.760
39	(Ukraine) Grégory Wathelet	Loriot	8	1.760	9.760
41	(France) Laurent Goffinet	Flipper d'Elle HN	9	0.900	9.900
42	(United States) Laura Kraut	Miss Independent	4	5.975	9.975
43	(Austria) Roland Englbrecht	Nip Armani	4	6.220	10.220
44	(Italy) Emilio Bicocchi	Jeckerson Kapitol d'Argonne	8	2.665	10.665
45	(United Kingdom) Tim Gredley	Omelli	5	5.690	10.690
46	(Switzerland) Beat Mändli	Indigo IX	4	6.780	10.780
47	(Germany) Christian Ahlmann	Cöster	8	4.000	12.000
48	(Denmark) Tina Lund	Carola	9	3.610	12.610
49	(Argentina) Max Amaya	Church Road	8	4.790	12.790
50	(Brazil) Álvaro Alfonso de Miranda Neto	Nike	9	4.235	13.235
51	(Spain) Jesus Garmendia Echeverria	Maddock	8	5.335	13.335
52	(Colombia) Carlos Lopez	Instit	10	3.620	13.620
53	(Italy) Juan Carlos García	Loro Piana Albin III	5	9.020	14.020
54	(Republic of Ireland) Cameron Hanley	Siec Hippica Kerman	9	5.375	14.375
55	(Argentina) Ricardo Kierkegaard	Rey Z	8	6.805	14.805
56	(Canada) Jill Henselwood	Special Ed	9	6.165	15.165
57	(United States) Margie Engle	Hidden Creek's Quervo Gold	4	12.065	16.065
58	(Belgium) Judy-Ann Melchoir	Grande Dame Z	9	7.310	16.310
59	(Sweden) Maria Gretzer	Spender S	9	7.385	16.385
60	(Republic of Ireland) Billy Twomey	Luidam	9	7.615	16.615
61	(Mexico) Federico Fernandez	Bohemio	8	9.610	17.610
62	(Italy) Jonella Ligresti	Quinta 27	6	12.365	18.365
63	(Canada) Ian Millar	In Style	9	9.370	18.370
64	(Finland) Mikael Forsten	BMC's Skybreaker	12	6.435	18.435
65	(Finland) Sebastian Numminen	Sails Away	13	5.455	18.455
66	(Austria) Stefan Eder	Cartier PSG	12	6.535	18.535
67	(Belgium) Dirk Demeersman	Clinton	16	2.755	18.755
68	(Greece) Antonis Petris	Gredo la Daviere	13	6.300	19.300
69	(Estonia) Gunnar Klettenberg	Novesta	9	10.620	19.620
70	(Malaysia) Syed Omar Almohdzar	Lui	10	9.820	19.820
71	(Norway) Tony Andre Hansen	Camiro	13	7.245	20.245
72	(Spain) Manuel Fernandez Saro	Quin Chin	13	7.465	20.465
73	(Hungary) James Wingrave	Agropoint Calira	14	6.855	20.855
74	(Australia) Rod Brown	Mr. Burns	9	12.300	21.300
75	(Czech Republic) Jiri Papousek	La Manche T	13	8.440	21.440
76	(Mexico) Marcela Lobo	Joskin	14	7.600	21.600
77	(Japan) Yuko Itakura	Portvliet	9	12.655	21.655
78	(Hungary) Zsolt Pirik	Havanna	9	13.050	22.050
79	(Libya) Fabrice Lyon	Jasmine du Perron	11	12.760	23.760
80	(France) Florian Angot	First de Launay	16	8.055	24.055
81	(Australia) Peter McMahon	Kolora Stud Genoa	9	15.195	24.195
82	(Italy) Giuseppe Rolli	Jericho de la Vie	17	7.910	24.910
83	(Mexico) Alberto Michan	Chinobampo Lavita	13	12.330	25.330
84	(Estonia) Hanno Ellermann	Poncorde	17	8.600	25.600
85	(Portugal) Antonio Portela Carneiro	Echo de Lessay	18	8.565	26.565
86	(Austria) Gerfried Puck	11th Bleeker	21	6.405	27.405
87	(Saudi Arabia) H.H. Prince Faisal Al-Shalan	Uthago	18	10.205	28.205
88	(Russia) Vladimir Beletskiy	Rezonanz	21	7.725	28.725
89	(Finland) Noora Pentti	Evli Cagliostro	17	12.455	29.455
90	(United Arab Emirates) Mohammed Al-Kumaiti	Al-Mutawakel	17	12.490	29.490
91	(Argentina) Guillermo Obligado	Carlson	18	11.545	29.545
92	(Saudi Arabia) Kamal Bahamdan	Campus	17	13.190	30.190
93	(Czech Republic) Veronika Macanova	Pompos	13	18.185	31.185
94	(Russia) Vladimir Panchenko	Lanteno	17	14.460	31.460
95	(Argentina) Jose Larocca	Svante	25	8.190	33.190
96	(Saudi Arabia) Abdullah Al-Sharbatly	Hugo Gesmeray	25	8.585	33.585
97	(Japan) Eiken Sato	Cayak DH	17	17.960	34.960
98	(Russia) Gennadiy Gashiboyazov	Papirus	28	8.685	36.685
99	(Egypt) Karim El-Zoghby	Baragway	21	16.360	37.360
100	(Czech Republic) Ondrej Nagr	Atlas	19	19.865	38.865
101	(South Africa) Roger Hessen	Quito	23	17.410	40.410
102	(Czech Republic) Zdenek Zila	Pinot Grigio	15	26.035	41.035
103	(Colombia) René Lopez	Isky	30	11.675	41.675
104	(Greece) Emmanouela Athanassiades	Rimini Z	18	24.380	42.380
105	(Australia) Jamie Kermond	Stylish King	21	46.035	67.035
106	(Sweden) Malin Baryard-Johnsson	Butterfly Flip	29	46.035	75.035
107	(Colombia) Manuel Torres	Chambacunero	Fall		5.470
108	(Poland) Krzyszlof Ludwiczak	HOF Schretstakens Quamiro	Eliminated		7.460
109	(New Zealand) Grant Wilson	Up and Down Cellebroedersbos	Refusal		14.835
110	(Canada) Chris Pratt	Rivendell	Fall		15.220
111	(Mexico) Ariana Azcarraga	Sambo	Eliminated		15.945
112	(El Salvador) Jose Alfredo Hernandez Ortega	Semtex P	Eliminated		46.035
112	(Saudi Arabia) H.R.H. Prince Abdullah Al-Soud	Allah Jabek	Retired		46.035

==== B ====
Part B of the second round of the individual jumping competition was held on August 31, 2006.

	Rider	Horse	Faults	Round 1 + 2A Points	Total
1	(United States) Beezie Madden	Authentic	0	0.000	0.000
2	(Netherlands) Gerco Schröder	Eurocommerce Berlin	0	0.425	0.425
3	(Germany) Ludger Beerbaum	L'Espoir	0	2.695	2.695
4	(Netherlands) Jeroen Dubbeldam	BMC Up and Down	0	4.100	4.100
5	(United States) McLain Ward	Sapphire	0	4.865	4.865
6	(Germany) Meredith Michaels-Beerbaum	Shutterfly	0	4.920	4.920
7	(Belgium) Jos Lansink	Cavalor Cumano	0	5.005	5.005
8	(Spain) Sergio Alvarez Moya	Le Rève du Nabab	0	5.235	5.235
9	(Switzerland) Niklaus Schurtenberger	Cantus	1	4.635	5.635
10	(Republic of Ireland) Marie Burke	Chippison	0	5.710	5.710
11	(Belgium) Ludo Philippaerts	Parco	0	6.045	6.045
12	(Netherlands) Albert Zoer	Okidoki	4	2.480	6.480
13	(Switzerland) Christina Liebherr	L.B. No Mercy	0	6.520	6.520
14	(United Kingdom) Michael Whitaker	Insul Tech Portofino	1	6.525	7.525
15	(Sweden) Royne Zetterman	Isaac	1	7.075	8.075
16	(Portugal) Luciana Diniz	Dover	4	4.160	8.160
17	(Sweden) Rolf-Göran Bengtsson	Ninja la Silla	0	8.910	8.910
18	(Brazil) Bernardo Alves	Canturo	8	1.355	9.355
19	(Ukraine) Katharina Offel	Atlanta	1	8.420	9.420
20	(Ukraine) Grégory Wathelet^{1}	Loriot	0	9.760	9.760
21	(Norway) Geir Gulliksen	Cattani	4	5.840	9.840
22	(Australia) Edwina Alexander	Isovlas Pialotta	8	2.235	10.235
23	(Ukraine) Jean-Claude Van Geenberghe	Osta Rugs Tresor	8	2.375	10.375
24	(France) Hervé Godignon	Obélix	1	9.400	10.400
25	(Bulgaria) Samantha McIntosh	Loxley	4	7.015	11.015
26	(Spain) Ricardo Jurado	Procasa le Monde	8	3.270	11.270
27	(Canada) Eric Lamaze	Hickstead	12	0.390	12.390
28	(Ukraine) Björn Nagel	Pilgrim	5	8.025	13.025
29	(Brazil) Cassio Rivetti	Olona	8	5.390	13.390
30	(United Kingdom) Nick Skelton	Russel	5	8.635	13.635
31	(United Kingdom) John Whitaker	Peppermill	5	8.680	13.680
32	(Switzerland) Werner Muff	Plot Blue	4	9.725	13.725
33	(Republic of Ireland) Cameron Hanley	Siec Hippica Kerman	0	14.375	14.375
34	(Austria) Jürgen Krackow	Looping	8	6.415	14.415
35	(Switzerland) Beat Mändli	Indigo IX	4	10.780	14.780
36	(Republic of Ireland) Shane Breen	World Cruise	12	3.985	15.985
37	(Germany) Christian Ahlmann	Cöster	4	12.000	16.000
38	(France) Michel Robert	Galet d'Auzay	8	8.080	16.080
39	(Denmark) Tina Lund	Carola	4	12.610	16.610
40	(Venezuela) Pablo Barrios	Sun God	8	8.905	16.905
41	(Jordan) Ibrahim Hani Kamal Bisharat	Qwinto	8	9.760	17.760
42	(United States) Laura Kraut	Miss Independent	8	9.975	17.975
43	(Austria) Roland Englbrecht	Nip Armani	8	10.220	18.220
44	(Spain) Jesus Garmendia Echeverria	Maddock	5	13.335	18.335
45	(United Kingdom) Tim Gredley	Omelli	9	10.690	19.690
46	(Italy) Juan Carlos García	Loro Piana Albin III	6	14.020	20.020
47	(United States) Margie Engle	Hidden Creek's Quervo Gold	4	16.065	20.065
48	(Argentina) Max Amaya	Church Road	8	12.790	20.790
49	(Republic of Ireland) Billy Twomey	Luidam	5	16.615	21.615
50	(France) Laurent Goffinet	Flipper d'Elle HN	12	9.900	21.900
51	(Belgium) Judy-Ann Melchoir	Grande Dame Z	8	16.310	24.310
52	(Spain) Manuel Fernandez Saro	Quin Chin	4	20.465	24.465
53	(Belgium) Dirk Demeersman	Clinton	8	18.755	26.755
54	(Netherlands) Piet Raymakers	Van Schijndel's Curtis	18	9.045	27.045
55	(Japan) Taizo Sugitani	Obelix	21	7.030	28.030
56	(Sweden) Maria Gretzer	Spender S	12	16.385	28.385
57	(Norway) Tony Andre Hansen	Camiro	9	20.245	29.245
58	(Finland) Mikael Forsten	BMC's Skybreaker	12	18.435	30.435
59	(Austria) Stefan Eder	Cartier PSG	12	18.535	30.535
60	(Italy) Giuseppe Rolli	Jericho de la Vie	8	24.910	32.910
61	(Mexico) Federico Fernandez	Bohemio	16	17.610	33.610
62	(Estonia) Gunnar Klettenberg	Novesta	14	19.620	33.620
63	(Brazil) Álvaro Alfonso de Miranda Neto	Nike	21	13.235	34.235
64	(Greece) Antonis Petris	Gredo la Daviere	16	19.300	35.300
65	(Russia) Vladimir Beletskiy	Rezonanz	9	28.725	37.725
66	(Malaysia) Syed Omar Almohdzar	Lui	18	19.820	37.820
67	(Mexico) Alberto Michan	Chinobampo Lavita	13	25.330	38.330
68	(Czech Republic) Jiri Papousek	La Manche T	17	21.440	38.440
69	(Finland) Sebastian Numminen	Sails Away	20	18.455	38.455
70	(Portugal) Antonio Portela Carneiro	Echo de Lessay	13	26.565	39.565
71	(Saudi Arabia) H.H. Prince Faisal Al-Shalan	Uthago	17	28.205	45.205
72	(Egypt) Karim El-Zoghby	Baragway	9	37.360	46.360
73	(Argentina) Jose Larocca	Svante	17	33.190	50.190
74	(Saudi Arabia) Kamal Bahamdan	Campus	21	30.190	51.190
75	(Japan) Yuko Itakura	Portvliet	33	21.655	54.655
76	(Greece) Emmanouela Athanassiades	Rimini Z	14	42.380	56.380
77	(South Africa) Roger Hessen	Quito	19	40.410	59.410
78	(United Arab Emirates) Mohammed Al-Kumaiti	Al-Mutawakel	34	29.490	63.490
79	(Colombia) René Lopez	Isky	27	41.675	68.675
80	(Czech Republic) Zdenek Zila	Pinot Grigio	Eliminated		41.035
81	(Germany) Marcus Ehning	Noltes Küchengirl	Retired		7.540
82	(Libya) Fabrice Lyon	Jasmine du Perron	Retired		23.760
83	(Estonia) Hanno Ellermann	Poncorde	Retired		25.600

- ^1 Grégory Wathelet withdrew prior to round 3, leaving the first reserve rider, Ricardo Jurado, with his spot. As a result, Wathelet finished the competition placed 26th overall.

=== Round 3 ===
==== A ====
Part A of the third round of the individual jumping competition was held on September 2, 2006.

	Rider	Horse	Faults	Round 1 + 2A + 2B Points	Total
1	(United States) Beezie Madden	Authentic	4	0.000	4.000
2	(Belgium) Jos Lansink	Cavalor Cumano	0	5.005	5.005
3	(Germany) Ludger Beerbaum	L'Espoir	4	2.695	6.695
4	(Netherlands) Gerco Schröder	Eurocommerce Berlin	8	0.425	8.425
5	(Germany) Meredith Michaels-Beerbaum	Shutterfly	5	4.920	9.920
6	(Australia) Edwina Alexander	Isovlas Pialotta	0	10.235	10.235
7	(Switzerland) Niklaus Schurtenberger	Cantus	5	5.635	10.635
8	(Netherlands) Jeroen Dubbeldam	BMC Up and Down	8	4.100	12.100
9	(United States) McLain Ward	Sapphire	8	4.865	12.865
10	(Brazil) Bernardo Alves	Canturo	4	9.355	13.355
11	(United Kingdom) Michael Whitaker	Insul Tech Portofino	6	7.525	13.525
12	(Belgium) Ludo Philippaerts	Parco	8	6.045	14.045
13	(Switzerland) Christina Liebherr	L.B. No Mercy	8	6.520	14.520
14	(Portugal) Luciana Diniz	Dover	8	8.160	16.160
15	(Sweden) Royne Zetterman	Isaac	9	8.075	17.075
16	(Spain) Sergio Alvarez Moya	Le Rève du Nabab	12	5.235	17.235
17	(Sweden) Rolf-Göran Bengtsson	Ninja la Silla	9	8.910	17.910
18	(Ukraine) Jean-Claude Van Geenberghe	Osta Rugs Tresor	8	10.375	18.375
19	(Netherlands) Albert Zoer	Okidoki	12	6.480	18.480
20	(Spain) Ricardo Jurado	Procasa le Monde	8	11.270	19.270
21	(Ukraine) Katharina Offel	Atlanta	13	9.420	22.420
22	(Norway) Geir Gulliksen	Cattani	13	9.840	22.840
23	(Bulgaria) Samantha McIntosh	Loxley	13	11.015	24.015
24	(Republic of Ireland) Marie Burke	Chippison	25	5.710	30.710
25	(France) Hervé Godignon	Obélix	Retired		10.400

==== B ====
Part B of the third round of the individual jumping competition was held on September 2, 2006.

	Rider	Horse	Faults	Round 1 + 2A + 2B + 3A Points	Total
1	(United States) Beezie Madden	Authentic	0	4.000	4.000
2	(Belgium) Jos Lansink	Cavalor Cumano	0	5.005	5.005
3	(Germany) Meredith Michaels-Beerbaum	Shutterfly	0	9.920	9.920
4	(Australia) Edwina Alexander	Isovlas Pialotta	0	10.235	10.235
5	(Germany) Ludger Beerbaum	L'Espoir	4	6.695	10.695
6	(Netherlands) Gerco Schröder	Eurocommerce Berlin	4	8.425	12.425
7	(United States) McLain Ward	Sapphire	0	12.865	12.865
8	(United Kingdom) Michael Whitaker	Insul Tech Portofino	0	13.525	13.525
9	(Belgium) Ludo Philippaerts	Parco	0	14.045	14.045
10	(Switzerland) Niklaus Schurtenberger	Cantus	4	10.635	14.635
11	(Netherlands) Jeroen Dubbeldam	BMC Up and Down	4	12.100	16.100
12	(Brazil) Bernardo Alves	Canturo	4	13.355	17.355
13	(Switzerland) Christina Liebherr	L.B. No Mercy	4	14.520	18.520
14	(Sweden) Royne Zetterman	Isaac	4	17.075	21.075
15	(Ukraine) Jean-Claude Van Geenberghe	Osta Rugs Tresor	4	18.375	22.375
16	(Spain) Ricardo Jurado	Procasa le Monde	4	19.270	23.270
17	(Bulgaria) Samantha McIntosh	Loxley	0	24.015	24.015
18	(Spain) Sergio Alvarez Moya	Le Rève du Nabab	8	17.235	25.235
19	(Sweden) Rolf-Göran Bengtsson	Ninja la Silla	8	17.910	25.910
20	(Netherlands) Albert Zoer	Okidoki	8	18.480	26.480
21	(Norway) Geir Gulliksen	Cattani	4	22.840	26.840
22	(Ukraine) Katharina Offel	Atlanta	12	22.420	34.420
23	(Portugal) Luciana Diniz	Dover	Did Not Start		16.160
24	(Republic of Ireland) Marie Burke	Chippison	Did Not Start		30.710

=== Final ===
	(Belgium) Jos Lansink	(Australia) Edwina Alexander	(Germany) Meredith Michaels-Beerbaum	(United States) Beezie Madden
Faults
Cavalor Cumano	0	0	0	0
Isovlas Pialotta	0	0	0	0
Shutterfly	0	4	0	0
Authentic	0	0	0	0

==== Jump Off ====
	Rider	Horse	Time (s)	Faults	Total time (s)
1	(Belgium) Jos Lansink	Cavalor Cumano	45.01	0	45.01
2	(United States) Beezie Madden	Authentic	43.74	4	47.74
3	(Germany) Meredith Michaels-Beerbaum	Shutterfly	45.40	4	49.40
