= Team jumping at the 2006 World Equestrian Games =

The team jumping competition at the 2006 FEI World Equestrian Games was held between August 29 and August 31, 2006.

== Medalists ==
Gold	Silver	Bronze
(Netherlands) Netherlands Jeroen Dubbeldam (BMC Up and Down); Piet Raymakers (Van Schijndel's Curtis); Gerco Schröder (Eurocommerce Berlin); Albert Zoer (Okidoki)	(United States) United States Margie Engle (Hidden Creek's Quervo Gold); Laura Kraut (Miss Independent); Beezie Madden (Authentic); McLain Ward (Sapphire)	(Germany) Germany Christian Ahlmann (Cöster); Ludger Beerbaum (L'Espoir); Marcus Ehning (Noltes Küchengirl); Meredith Michaels-Beerbaum (Shutterfly)

== Complete results ==
Team was eliminated from further competition. This occurred because one or more riders was eliminated, resulting in the team having less than the required three riders to compete.

Team did not qualify for the next round.

=== Round 1 ===
The first round of the team jumping competition was held on August 29, 2006. It was a speed class.

	Team	Rider	Horse	Time (s)	Faults	Total time (s)	Points
1	Netherlands	Piet Raymakers	Van Schijndel's Curtis	85.71	0	85.71	4.045
1	Netherlands	Jeroen Dubbeldam	BMC Up and Down	83.82	0	83.82	3.100
1	Netherlands	Albert Zoer	Okidoki	82.58	0	82.58	2.480
1	Netherlands	Gerco Schröder	Eurocommerce Berlin	78.47	0	78.47	0.425
1	Netherlands						6.005
2	United States	Margie Engle	Hidden Creek's Quervo Gold	85.75	16	101.75	12.065
2	United States	Laura Kraut	Miss Independent	85.57	4	89.57	5.975
2	United States	McLain Ward	Sapphire	79.35	0	79.35	0.865
2	United States	Beezie Madden	Authentic	77.62	0	77.62	0.000
2	United States						6.840
3	Brazil	Álvaro Alfonso de Miranda Neto	Nike	82.09	4	86.09	4.235
3	Brazil	Cassio Rivetti	Olona	80.40	0	80.40	1.390
3	Brazil	Bernardo Alves	Canturo	80.33	0	80.33	1.355
3	Brazil						6.980
4	Belgium	Judy-Ann Melchoir	Grande Dame Z	88.24	4	92.24	7.310
4	Belgium	Jos Lansink	Cavalor Cumano	83.63	4	87.63	5.005
4	Belgium	Dirk Demeersman	Clinton	79.13	4	83.13	2.755
4	Belgium	Ludo Philippaerts	Parco	77.71	4	81.71	2.045
4	Belgium						9.805
5	Spain	Manuel Fernández Saro	Quin Chin	84.55	8	92.55	7.465
5	Spain	Jesús Garmendia	Maddock	80.29	8	88.29	5.335
5	Spain	Ricardo Jurado	Procasa le Monde	84.16	0	84.16	3.270
5	Spain	Sergio Alvarez Moya	Le Rève du Nabab	80.09	0	80.09	1.235
5	Spain						9.840
6	Germany	Christian Ahlmann	Cöster	81.62	4	85.62	4.000
6	Germany	Meredith Michaels-Beerbaum	Shutterfly	81.46	4	85.46	3.920
6	Germany	Marcus Ehning	Noltes Küchengirl	76.70	8	84.70	3.540
6	Germany	Ludger Beerbaum	L'Espoir	83.01	0	83.01	2.695
6	Germany						10.155
7	France	Florian Angot	First de Launay	81.73	12	93.73	8.055
7	France	Hervé Godignon	Obélix	84.42	4	88.42	5.400
7	France	Michel Robert	Galet d'Auzay	81.78	4	85.78	4.080
7	France	Laurent Goffinet	Flipper d'Elle HN	79.42	0	79.42	0.900
7	France						10.380
8	(Republic of Ireland) Ireland	Billy Twomey	Luidam	84.85	8	92.85	7.615
8	(Republic of Ireland) Ireland	Cameron Hanley	Siec Hippica Kerman	84.37	4	88.37	5.375
8	(Republic of Ireland) Ireland	Shane Breen	World Cruise	81.59	4	85.59	3.985
8	(Republic of Ireland) Ireland	Marie Burke	Chippison	81.04	0	81.04	1.710
8	(Republic of Ireland) Ireland						11.070
9	Ukraine	Katharina Offel	Atlanta	84.46	8	92.46	7.420
9	Ukraine	Björn Nagel	Pilgrim	83.67	8	91.67	7.025
9	Ukraine	Jean-Claude Van Geenberghe	Osta Rugs Tresor	78.37	4	82.37	2.375
9	Ukraine	Grégory Wathelet	Loriot	81.14	0	81.14	1.760
9	Ukraine						11.160
10	Switzerland	Beat Mändli	Indigo IX	83.18	8	91.18	6.780
10	Switzerland	Christina Liebherr	L.B. No Mercy	82.66	8	90.66	6.520
10	Switzerland	Werner Muff	Plot Blue	83.07	4	87.07	4.725
10	Switzerland	Niklaus Schurtenberger	Cantus	84.89	0	84.89	3.635
10	Switzerland						14.880
11	United Kingdom	Nick Skelton	Russel	84.89	8	92.89	7.635
11	United Kingdom	Tim Gredley	Omelli	81.00	8	89.00	5.690
11	United Kingdom	Michael Whitaker	Insul Tech Portofino	84.67	4	88.67	5.525
11	United Kingdom	John Whitaker	Peppermill	84.98	0	84.98	3.680
11	United Kingdom						14.895
12	Austria	Stefan Eder	Cartier PSG	82.69	8	90.69	6.535
12	Austria	Gerfried Puck	11th Bleeker	82.43	8	90.43	6.405
12	Austria	Roland Englbrecht	Nip Armani	86.06	4	90.06	6.220
12	Austria	Jürgen Krackow	Looping	78.45	4	82.45	2.415
12	Austria						15.040
13	Sweden	Malin Baryard-Johnsson	Butterfly Flip	Refusal			46.035
13	Sweden	Maria Gretzer	Spender S	84.39	8	92.39	7.385
13	Sweden	Rolf-Göran Bengtsson	Ninja la Silla	83.44	4	87.44	4.910
13	Sweden	Royne Zetterman	Isaac	83.77	0	83.77	3.075
13	Sweden						15.370
14	Canada	Chris Pratt	Rivendell	104.06	4	108.06	15.220
14	Canada	Ian Millar	In Style	84.36	12	96.36	9.370
14	Canada	Jill Henselwood	Special Ed	85.95	4	89.95	6.165
14	Canada	Eric Lamaze	Hickstead	78.40	0	78.40	0.390
14	Canada						15.925
15	Italy	Jonella Ligresti	Quinta 27	90.35	12	102.35	12.365
15	Italy	Juan Carlos García	Loro Piana Albin III	91.66	4	95.66	9.020
15	Italy	Giuseppe Rolli	Jericho de la Vie	89.44	4	93.44	7.910
15	Italy	Emilio Bicocchi	Jeckerson Kapitol d'Argonne	82.95	0	82.95	2.665
15	Italy						19.595
16	Argentina	Guillermo Obligado	Carlson	92.71	8	100.71	11.545
16	Argentina	Jose Larocca	Svante	86.00	8	94.00	8.190
16	Argentina	Ricardo Kierkegaard	Rey Z	83.23	8	91.23	6.805
16	Argentina	Max Amaya	Church Road	87.20	0	87.20	4.790
16	Argentina						19.785
17	Colombia	René Lopez	Isky	88.97	12	100.97	11.675
17	Colombia	Manuel Torres	Chambacunero	80.56	8	88.56	5.470
17	Colombia	Carlos Lopez	Instit	84.86	0	84.86	3.620
17	Colombia						20.765
18	Finland	Noora Pentti	Evli Cagliostro	90.53	12	102.53	12.455
18	Finland	Mikael Forsten	BMC's Skybreaker	86.49	4	90.49	6.435
18	Finland	Sebastian Numminen	Sails Away	84.53	4	88.53	5.455
18	Finland						24.345
19	Mexico	Ariana Azcarraga	Sambo	97.51	12	109.51	15.945
19	Mexico	Alberto Michan	Chinobampo Lavita	86.28	16	102.28	12.330
19	Mexico	Federico Fernandez	Bohemio	80.84	16	96.84	9.610
19	Mexico	Marcela Lobo	Joskin	88.82	4	92.82	7.600
19	Mexico						29.540
20	Australia	Jamie Kermond	Stylish King	Refusal			46.035
20	Australia	Peter McMahon	Kolora Stud Genoa	104.01	4	108.01	15.195
20	Australia	Rod Brown	Mr. Burns	86.22	16	102.22	12.300
20	Australia	Edwina Alexander	Isovlas Pialotta	78.09	4	82.09	2.235
20	Australia						29.730
21	Russia	Vladimir Panchenko	Lanteno	94.54	12	106.54	14.460
21	Russia	Gennadiy Gashiboyazov	Papirus	82.99	12	94.99	8.685
21	Russia	Vladimir Beletskiy	Rezonanz	89.07	4	93.07	7.725
21	Russia						30.870
22	Saudi Arabia	H.R.H. Prince Abdullah Al-Soud	Allah Jabek	Refusal			46.035
22	Saudi Arabia	Kamal Bahamdan	Campus	92.00	12	104.00	13.190
22	Saudi Arabia	H.H. Prince Faisal Al-Shalan	Uthago	90.03	8	98.03	10.205
22	Saudi Arabia	Abdullah Al-Sharbatly	Hugo Gesmeray	78.79	16	94.79	8.585
22	Saudi Arabia						31.980
23	Japan	Eiken Sato	Cayak DH	89.54	24	113.54	17.960
23	Japan	Yuko Itakura	Portvliet	86.93	16	102.93	12.655
23	Japan	Taizo Sugitani	Obelix	87.68	4	91.68	7.030
23	Japan						37.645
24	Czech Republic	Zdenek Zila	Pinot Grigio	117.69	12	129.69	26.035
24	Czech Republic	Ondrej Nagr	Atlas	105.35	12	117.35	19.865
24	Czech Republic	Veronika Macanova	Pompos	105.99	8	113.99	18.185
24	Czech Republic	Jiri Papousek	La Manche T	90.50	4	94.50	8.440
24	Czech Republic						46.490
25	Hungary	Mariann Hugyecz	Superville	Fall			46.035
25	Hungary	Zsolt Pirik	Havanna	91.72	12	103.72	13.050
25	Hungary	James Wingrave	Agropoint Calira	83.33	8	91.33	6.855
25	Hungary						Eliminated

=== Round 2 ===
The second round of the team jumping competition was held on August 30, 2006.

	Team	Rider	Horse	Faults	Round 1 Points	Total
1	Netherlands	Piet Raymakers	Van Schijndel's Curtis	5	4.045	0.000
1	Netherlands	Jeroen Dubbeldam	BMC Up and Down	1	3.100	4.100
1	Netherlands	Albert Zoer	Okidoki	0	2.480	2.480
1	Netherlands	Gerco Schröder	Eurocommerce Berlin	0	0.425	0.425
1	Netherlands					7.005
2	Ukraine	Katharina Offel	Atlanta	1	7.420	1.000
2	Ukraine	Björn Nagel	Pilgrim	1	7.025	8.025
2	Ukraine	Jean-Claude Van Geenberghe	Osta Rugs Tresor	0	2.375	2.375
2	Ukraine	Grégory Wathelet	Loriot	8	1.760	1.760
2	Ukraine					13.160
3	United States	Margie Engle	Hidden Creek's Quervo Gold	4	12.065	4.000
3	United States	Laura Kraut	Miss Independent	4	5.975	5.975
3	United States	McLain Ward	Sapphire	4	0.865	4.865
3	United States	Beezie Madden	Authentic	0	0.000	0.000
3	United States					14.840
4	Germany	Christian Ahlmann	Cöster	8	4.000	0.000
4	Germany	Meredith Michaels-Beerbaum	Shutterfly	1	3.920	4.920
4	Germany	Marcus Ehning	Noltes Küchengirl	4	3.540	7.540
4	Germany	Ludger Beerbaum	L'Espoir	0	2.695	2.695
4	Germany					15.155
5	Switzerland	Beat Mändli	Indigo IX	4	6.780	4.000
5	Switzerland	Christina Liebherr	L.B. No Mercy	0	6.520	6.520
5	Switzerland	Werner Muff	Plot Blue	5	4.725	4.725
5	Switzerland	Niklaus Schurtenberger	Cantus	1	3.635	4.635
5	Switzerland					19.880
6	Brazil	Álvaro Alfonso de Miranda Neto	Nike	9	4.235	13.235
6	Brazil	Cassio Rivetti	Olona	4	1.390	5.390
6	Brazil	Bernardo Alves	Canturo	0	1.355	1.355
6	Brazil					19.980
7	Spain	Manuel Fernandez Saro	Quin Chin	13	7.465	0.000
7	Spain	Jesus Garmendia Echeverria	Maddock	8	5.335	13.335
7	Spain	Ricardo Jurado	Procasa le Monde	0	3.270	3.270
7	Spain	Sergio Alvarez Moya	Le Rève du Nabab	4	1.235	5.235
7	Spain					21.840
8	United Kingdom	Nick Skelton	Russel	1	7.635	1.000
8	United Kingdom	Tim Gredley	Omelli	5	5.690	10.690
8	United Kingdom	Michael Whitaker	Insul Tech Portofino	1	5.525	6.525
8	United Kingdom	John Whitaker	Peppermill	5	3.680	3.680
8	United Kingdom					21.895
9	Belgium	Judy-Ann Melchoir	Grande Dame Z	9	7.310	9.000
9	Belgium	Jos Lansink	Cavalor Cumano	0	5.005	5.005
9	Belgium	Dirk Demeersman	Clinton	16	2.755	2.755
9	Belgium	Ludo Philippaerts	Parco	4	2.045	6.045
9	Belgium					22.805
10	(Republic of Ireland) Ireland	Billy Twomey	Luidam	9	7.615	9.000
10	(Republic of Ireland) Ireland	Cameron Hanley	Siec Hippica Kerman	9	5.375	5.375
10	(Republic of Ireland) Ireland	Shane Breen	World Cruise	0	3.985	3.985
10	(Republic of Ireland) Ireland	Marie Burke	Chippison	4	1.710	5.710
10	(Republic of Ireland) Ireland					24.070
11	France	Florian Angot	First de Launay	16	8.055	0.000
11	France	Hervé Godignon	Obélix	4	5.400	9.400
11	France	Michel Robert	Galet d'Auzay	4	4.080	8.080
11	France	Laurent Goffinet	Flipper d'Elle HN	9	0.900	9.900
11	France					27.380
12	Sweden	Malin Baryard-Johnsson	Butterfly Flip	29	46.035	0.000
12	Sweden	Maria Gretzer	Spender S	9	7.385	16.385
12	Sweden	Rolf-Göran Bengtsson	Ninja la Silla	4	4.910	8.910
12	Sweden	Royne Zetterman	Isaac	4	3.075	7.075
12	Sweden					32.370
13	Canada	Chris Pratt	Rivendell	Fall	15.220	0.000
13	Canada	Ian Millar	In Style	9	9.370	18.370
13	Canada	Jill Henselwood	Special Ed	9	6.165	15.165
13	Canada	Eric Lamaze	Hickstead	0	0.390	0.390
13	Canada					33.925
14	Austria	Stefan Eder	Cartier PSG	12	6.535	12.000
14	Austria	Gerfried Puck	11th Bleeker	21	6.405	6.405
14	Austria	Roland Englbrecht	Nip Armani	4	6.220	10.220
14	Austria	Jürgen Krackow	Looping	4	2.415	6.415
14	Austria					35.040
15	Italy	Jonella Ligresti	Quinta 27	6	12.365	6.000
15	Italy	Juan Carlos García	Loro Piana Albin III	5	9.020	14.020
15	Italy	Giuseppe Rolli	Jericho de la Vie	17	7.910	7.910
15	Italy	Emilio Bicocchi	Jeckerson Kapitol d'Argonne	8	2.665	10.665
15	Italy					38.595
16	Australia	Jamie Kermond	Stylish King	21	46.035	0.000
16	Australia	Peter McMahon	Kolora Stud Genoa	9	15.195	24.195
16	Australia	Rod Brown	Mr. Burns	9	12.300	21.300
16	Australia	Edwina Alexander	Isovlas Pialotta	0	2.235	2.235
16	Australia					47.730
17	Argentina	Guillermo Obligado	Carlson	18	11.545	18.000
17	Argentina	Jose Larocca	Svante	25	8.190	8.190
17	Argentina	Ricardo Kierkegaard	Rey Z	8	6.805	14.805
17	Argentina	Max Amaya	Church Road	8	4.790	12.790
17	Argentina					53.785
18	Japan	Eiken Sato	Cayak DH	17	17.960	34.960
18	Japan	Yuko Itakura	Portvliet	9	12.655	21.655
18	Japan	Taizo Sugitani	Obelix	0	7.030	7.030
18	Japan					63.645
19	Mexico	Ariana Azcarraga	Sambo	Eliminated	15.945	0.000
19	Mexico	Alberto Michan	Chinobampo Lavita	13	12.330	25.330
19	Mexico	Federico Fernandez	Bohemio	8	9.610	17.610
19	Mexico	Marcela Lobo	Joskin	14	7.600	21.600
19	Mexico					64.540
20	Finland	Noora Pentti	Evli Cagliostro	17	12.455	29.455
20	Finland	Mikael Forsten	BMC's Skybreaker	12	6.435	18.435
20	Finland	Sebastian Numminen	Sails Away	13	5.455	18.455
20	Finland					66.345
21	Czech Republic	Zdenek Zila	Pinot Grigio	15	26.035	15.000
21	Czech Republic	Ondrej Nagr	Atlas	19	19.865	19.865
21	Czech Republic	Veronika Macanova	Pompos	13	18.185	31.185
21	Czech Republic	Jiri Papousek	La Manche T	13	8.440	21.440
21	Czech Republic					87.490
22	Saudi Arabia	H.R.H. Prince Abdullah Al-Soud	Allah Jabek	Retired	46.035	0.000
22	Saudi Arabia	Kamal Bahamdan	Campus	17	13.190	30.190
22	Saudi Arabia	H.H. Prince Faisal Al-Shalan	Uthago	18	10.205	28.205
22	Saudi Arabia	Abdullah Al-Sharbatly	Hugo Gesmeray	25	8.585	33.585
22	Saudi Arabia					91.980
23	Russia	Vladimir Panchenko	Lanteno	17	14.460	31.460
23	Russia	Gennadiy Gashiboyazov	Papirus	28	8.685	36.685
23	Russia	Vladimir Beletskiy	Rezonanz	21	7.725	28.725
23	Russia					96.870
24	(Colombia) Columbia	René Lopez	Isky	30	11.675	41.675
24	(Colombia) Columbia	Manuel Torres	Chambacunero	Fall	5.470	5.470
24	(Colombia) Columbia	Carlos Lopez	Instit	10	3.620	13.620
24	(Colombia) Columbia					Eliminated

=== Final ===
The final round of the team jumping competition was held on August 31, 2006.

	Team	Rider	Horse	Faults	Round 1 Points	Round 2 Points	Total
1	Netherlands	Piet Raymakers	Van Schijndel's Curtis	18	4.045	5	0.000
1	Netherlands	Jeroen Dubbeldam	BMC Up and Down	0	3.100	1	4.100
1	Netherlands	Albert Zoer	Okidoki	4	2.480	0	6.480
1	Netherlands	Gerco Schröder	Eurocommerce Berlin	0	0.425	0	0.425
1	Netherlands						11.005
2	United States	Margie Engle	Hidden Creek's Quervo Gold	4	12.065	4	8.000
2	United States	Laura Kraut	Miss Independent	8	5.975	4	5.975
2	United States	McLain Ward	Sapphire	0	0.865	4	4.865
2	United States	Beezie Madden	Authentic	0	0.000	0	0.000
2	United States						18.840
3	Germany	Christian Ahlmann	Cöster	4	4.000	8	4.000
3	Germany	Meredith Michaels-Beerbaum	Shutterfly	0	3.920	1	4.920
3	Germany	Marcus Ehning	Noltes Küchengirl	Retired	3.540	4	7.540
3	Germany	Ludger Beerbaum	L'Espoir	0	2.695	0	2.695
3	Germany						19.155
4	Ukraine	Katharina Offel	Atlanta	1	7.420	1	2.000
4	Ukraine	Björn Nagel	Pilgrim	5	7.025	1	13.025
4	Ukraine	Jean-Claude Van Geenberghe	Osta Rugs Tresor	8	2.375	0	2.375
4	Ukraine	Grégory Wathelet	Loriot	0	1.760	8	1.760
4	Ukraine						19.160
5	Switzerland	Beat Mändli	Indigo IX	4	6.780	4	4.000
5	Switzerland	Christina Liebherr	L.B. No Mercy	0	6.520	0	6.520
5	Switzerland	Werner Muff	Plot Blue	4	4.725	5	8.725
5	Switzerland	Niklaus Schurtenberger	Cantus	1	3.635	1	5.635
5	Switzerland						24.880
6	(Republic of Ireland) Ireland	Billy Twomey	Luidam	5	7.615	9	14.000
6	(Republic of Ireland) Ireland	Cameron Hanley	Siec Hippica Kerman	0	5.375	9	5.375
6	(Republic of Ireland) Ireland	Shane Breen	World Cruise	12	3.985	0	3.985
6	(Republic of Ireland) Ireland	Marie Burke	Chippison	0	1.710	4	5.710
6	(Republic of Ireland) Ireland						29.070
7	Belgium	Judy-Ann Melchoir	Grande Dame Z	8	7.310	9	17.000
7	Belgium	Jos Lansink	Cavalor Cumano	0	5.005	0	5.005
7	Belgium	Dirk Demeersman	Clinton	8	2.755	16	2.755
7	Belgium	Ludo Philippaerts	Parco	0	2.045	4	6.045
7	Belgium						30.805
8	Spain	Manuel Fernandez Saro	Quin Chin	4	7.465	13	4.000
8	Spain	Jesus Garmendia Echeverria	Maddock	5	5.335	8	13.335
8	Spain	Ricardo Jurado	Procasa le Monde	8	3.270	0	3.270
8	Spain	Sergio Alvarez Moya	Le Rève du Nabab	0	1.235	4	5.235
8	Spain						30.840
9	United Kingdom	Nick Skelton	Russel	5	7.635	1	6.000
9	United Kingdom	Tim Gredley	Omelli	9	5.690	5	10.690
9	United Kingdom	Michael Whitaker	Insul Tech Portofino	1	5.525	1	7.525
9	United Kingdom	John Whitaker	Peppermill	5	3.680	5	5.680
9	United Kingdom						32.895
10	Brazil	Álvaro Alfonso de Miranda Neto	Nike	21	4.235	9	34.235
10	Brazil	Cassio Rivetti	Olona	8	1.390	4	5.390
10	Brazil	Bernardo Alves	Canturo	8	1.355	0	1.355
10	Brazil						56.980
