= Ahmann =

Ahmann is a surname. Notable people with the surname include:

- Crissy Ahmann-Leighton (born 1970), American swimmer, and Olympic champion
- Erhard Ahmann (1941–2005), German football manager
- Jörg Ahmann (born 1966), German beach volleyball player
- Mathew Ahmann (1931–2001), American Catholic layman and civil rights activist
- Philipp Ahmann (born 1974), German conductor, especially known as a choral conductor

== See also ==
- Ahlmann
- Ahman
