= 2007 FEI European Jumping Championship =

The 2007 FEI European Jumping Championship was the 29th edition of the European Show Jumping Championships. Running from August 14 to August 19, 2007, it was the second edition held at the MVV Riding Stadium in Mannheim, Germany, the previous being the 1997 championships. Meredith Michaels-Beerbaum of Germany won the individual jumping event, while the Netherlands won the team jumping event. Mannheim incorporated the event as part of its 400th anniversary celebrations.

== Results ==
=== Medal table ===
Rank	Nation	Gold	Silver	Bronze	Total
1	Germany (GER)	1	1	1	3
2	Netherlands (NED)	1	0	0	1
3	Belgium (BEL)	0	1	0	1
4	Great Britain (GBR)	0	0	1	1
Totals (4 entries)		2	2	2	6

=== Individual jumping ===
Gold	Silver	Bronze
(Germany) Meredith Michaels-Beerbaum on Shutterfly	(Belgium) Jos Lansink on Cavalor Cumano	(Germany) Ludger Beerbaum on Goldfever

=== Team jumping ===
Gold	Silver	Bronze
Netherlands Jeroen Dubbeldam on BMC Up and Down; Gerco Schröder on Eurocommerce Berlin; Vincent Voorn on Audi's Alpapillon-Armanie; Albert Zoer on Okidoki	Germany Christian Ahlmann on Cöster; Ludger Beerbaum on Goldfever; Marcus Ehning on Noltes Küchengirl; Meredith Michaels-Beerbaum on Shutterfly	(United Kingdom) Great Britain David McPherson on Pilgrim II; Ellen Whitaker on Locarno; John Whitaker on Peppermill; Michael Whitaker on Suncal Portofino
