= VF Venieri =

Venieri SpA
- Company type: Società per azioni (S.p.A)
- Industry: Heavy equipment
- Founded: 1948; 78 years ago
- Headquarters: Lugo, Emilia-Romagna, Italy
- Area served: Worldwide
- Products: Special vehicles
- Website: www.vf-venieri.com

Venieri is an Italian manufacturer of heavy equipment, that includes loaders and backhoes. The company is based in Lugo, Emilia-Romagna.

== History ==
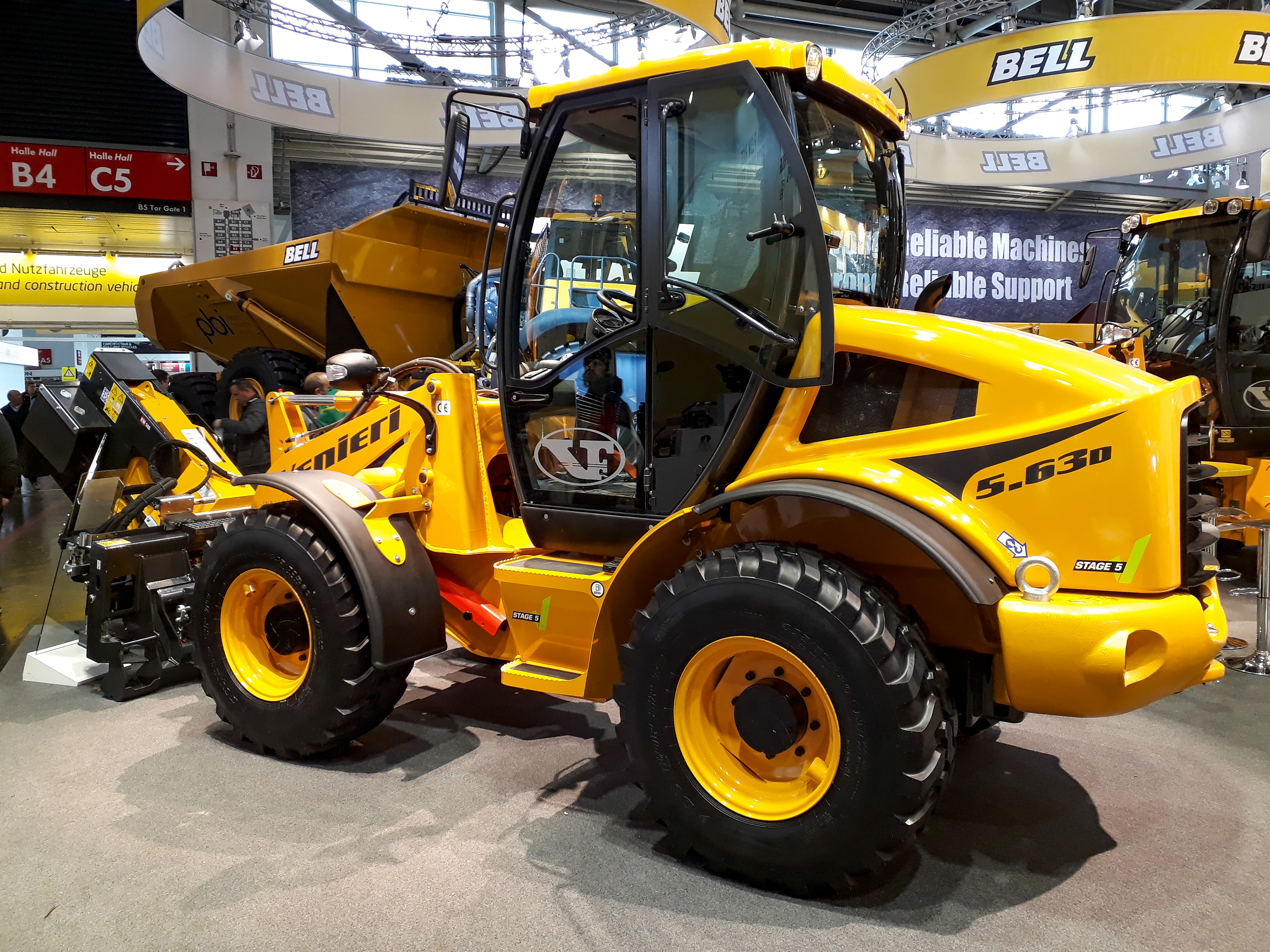
A VENIERI 5.63D loader in 2019

The company was founded in 1947 by brothers and mechanical engineers Ferdinaldo and Carlo Venieri. Before starting the company they worked in a workshop to fix broken machines.

In 1948 they built their first machine, a caterpillar tractor. Wheeled tractors began in 1953. Engines were supplied by Guldner and Slanzi. From 1956 Perkins P4 diesel engines were used.

From 1962 the company started to produce forklift trucks. From 1968, hydrostatic transmissions were available for earth-movers and forklifts.

In 1980 Venieri S.p.A. moved to a new modern factory, and production started of wheel loaders and backhoe loaders.

The company had a partnership with Case Corporation, Massey Ferguson, Werklust, Ahlmann, IHI IMER and Yanmar.
