= Beerbaum =

Beerbaum is a surname. Notable people with the surname include:

- Ludger Beerbaum (born 1963), German equestrian
- Meredith Michaels-Beerbaum (born 1969), American-German equestrian
