= Ahman =

Ahman is a given name and a surname, which in Nordic countries is written as Åhman. Notable people with the name include:

Given name

- Ahman Green, American football running back
- Ahman Pategi, Former Northern Nigeria first minister

Surname

- Arne Åhman (1925–2022), Swedish athlete
- Pauline Åhman (1812–1904), Swedish harpist
- Rezuan Khan Ahman, Malaysian football player
- Robert Åhman Persson (born 1987), Swedish football player
- Ronald Åhman (born 1957), Swedish football player
- Sule Ahman, Nigerian military officer
- Aliyu Ahman-Pategi, Nigeria politician

== See also ==
- Adam-ondi-Ahman
