= Federico Fernández (equestrian) =

Mexican equestrian

Personal information
- Full name: Federico Carlos Fernández Senderos
- Born: 29 March 1968 (age 58); Nopalucan, Mexico
- Height: 173 cm (5 ft 8 in)
Medal record
Equestrian
Representing Mexico
Pan American Games
Silver medal – second place	2003 Santo Domingo	Team jumping

Federico Carlos Fernández Senderos (born 29 March 1968 in Nopalucan, Mexico) is an equestrian showjumper.

He represented his country in the 2004 Summer Olympics in both the individual and team jumping events.

In 2006, he competed in the 2006 FEI World Equestrian Games (again, both the individual jumping and team jumping events).

Similar to 2004, Fernandez represented Mexico in the individual and team jumping events of the 2008 Summer Olympics and 2012 Summer Olympics.
