= Ahlmann =

Ahlmann is a surname. Notable people with the surname include:

- Christian Ahlmann (born 1974), German equestrian
- Hans Wilhelmsson Ahlmann (1889–1974), Swedish geographer, glaciologist, and diplomat
- Lis Ahlmann (1894–1979), Danish weaver and textile designer
- Vilhelm Ahlmann (1852–1928), Danish-Swedish architect
- Viktor Ahlmann (born 1995), Danish football player

== See also ==
- Else Ahlmann-Ohlsen (1907–1994), Danish fencer
- Ahlmann Glacier, a glacier of Antarctica
- Ahlmann Ridge, a ridge of Antarctica
- Erik Ahlman (1892–1952), Finnish philosopher and linguist
