= Rezuan Khan Ahman =

Malaysian footballer

Personal information
- Full name: Rezuan Khan bin Ahman
- Date of birth: 1 September 1979 (age 47)
- Place of birth: Kota Kinabalu, Sabah, Malaysia
- Height: 1.83 m (6 ft 0 in)
- Position: Midfielder

Senior career*
Years	Team	Apps	(Gls)
1998–2005	Sabah FA		(7)
2007–2008	Beverly FC		
2009–2010	Sabah FA	2	(0)
- * Club domestic league appearances and goals as of 12 January 2009

Rezuan Khan Ahman (born 1 September 1979) is a Malaysian footballer who plays as a midfielder for Sabah FA in the Malaysia Premier League. He was the top scorer for Sabah FA in the 2000 season with 6 goals. He previously played in the state league with Beverly FC and Liga Pemuda UMNO 2006 where he finished as the top scorer.
