= Else Ahlmann-Ohlsen =

Danish fencer (1907–1994)

Personal information
- Born: 5 November 1907 Copenhagen, Denmark
- Died: 26 February 1994 (aged 86) Copenhagen, Denmark

Sport
- Sport: Fencing

Else Margrethe Ahlmann-Ohlsen (5 November 1907 – 26 February 1994) was a Danish fencer. She competed in the women's individual foil at the 1928 Summer Olympics.
