= Erhard Ahmann =

German football manager

Personal information
- Full name: Erhard Ahmann
- Date of birth: 21 May 1941
- Place of birth: Sundern, Third Reich
- Date of death: 14 December 2005 (aged 64)
- Place of death: Gütersloh, Germany
- Position: Defender

Senior career*
Years	Team	Apps	(Gls)
–1966	TuS Sundern		
1966–1968	Lüner SV		
1968–1973	SV Arminia Gütersloh		

Managerial career
- 1972: West Germany (assistant)
- 1973–1974: SVA Gütersloh
- 1974–1976: Arminia Bielefeld
- 1976–1977: SG Wattenscheid 09
- 1977: Wuppertaler SV
- 1978: SC Herford
- 1978–1981: Alemannia Aachen
- 1981–1982: Union Solingen
- 1983–1984: Alemannia Aachen
- 1984–1985: VfL Osnabrück
- * Club domestic league appearances and goals

Erhard Ahmann (21 May 1941 – 14 December 2005) was a German football manager.

In 1972, he was the assistant manager of the West Germany national football team. Later he most notably managed Arminia Bielefeld and Alemannia Aachen.
