= Marcus Ehning =

German equestrian

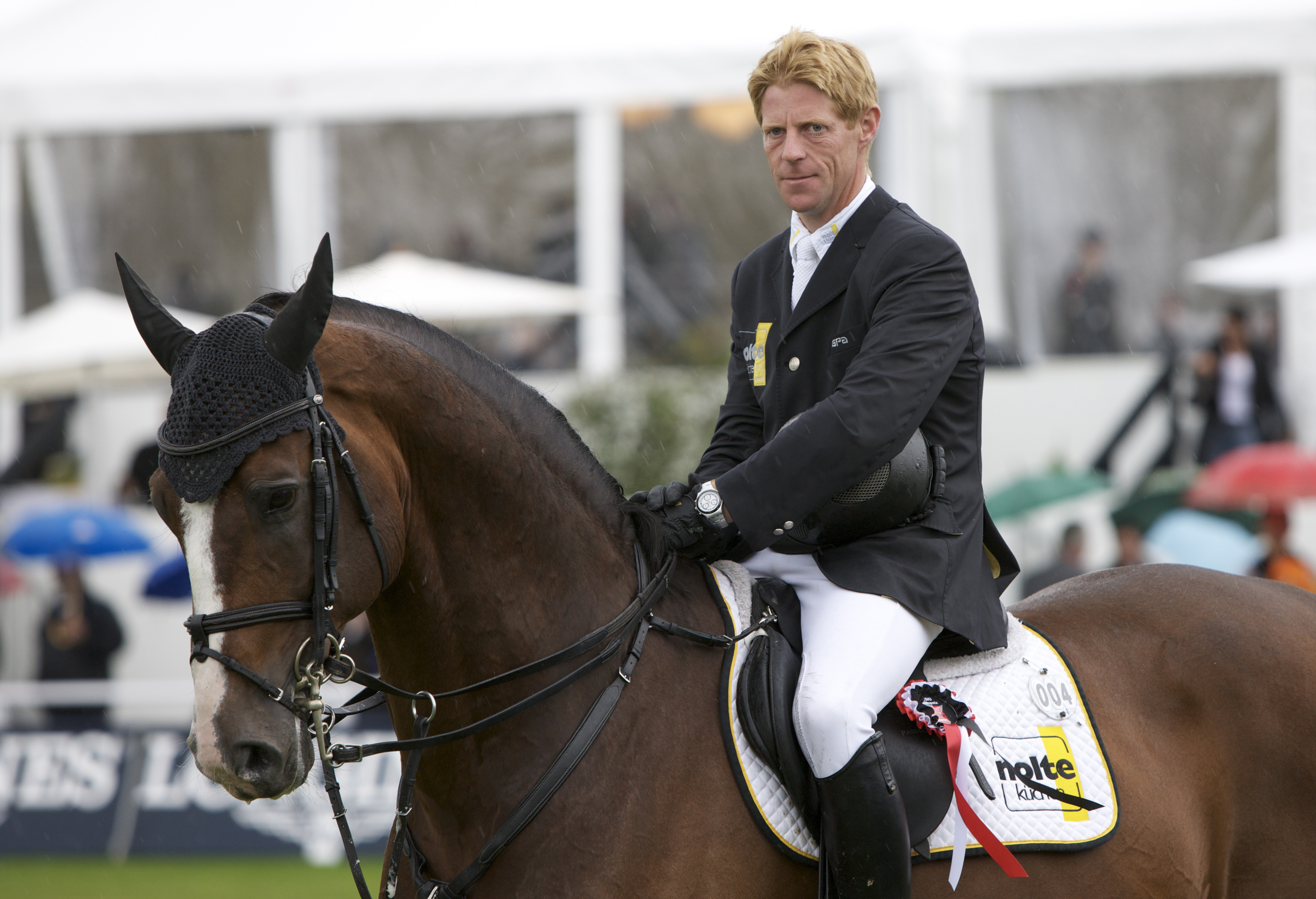

Personal information
- Full name: Marcus Ehning
- Nationality: Germany
- Discipline: Show jumping
- Born: 19 April 1974 (age 52); Südlohn, West Germany
- Height: 5 ft 2 in (1.57 m)
- Weight: 137 lb (62 kg; 9 st 11 lb)
Medal record
Representing Germany
Equestrian
Olympic Games
| Gold medal – first place | 2000 Sydney | Team jumping |
World Championships
| Bronze medal – third place | 2006 Aachen | Team jumping |
| Gold medal – first place | 2010 Lexington | Team jumping |
| Bronze medal – third place | 2018 Tryon | Team jumping |
| Gold medal – first place | 2026 Aachen | Team jumping |
European Championships
| Gold medal – first place | 1999 Hickstead | Team jumping |
| Gold medal – first place | 2003 Donaueschingen | Team jumping |
| Gold medal – first place | 2005 San Patrignano | Team jumping |
| Silver medal – second place | 2007 Mannheim | Team jumping |
| Bronze medal – third place | 2009 Windsor | Team jumping |
| Silver medal – second place | 2019 Rotterdam | Team jumping |
| Silver medal – second place | 2021 Riesenbeck | Team jumping |
| Bronze medal – third place | 2025 A Coruña | Team jumping |
| Bronze medal – third place | 2003 Donaueschingen | Individual jumping |

Marcus Ehning (born 19 April 1974 in Südlohn, North Rhine-Westphalia) is a German show jumping champion, Olympic champion from 2000. He is married to Nadia Ehning (née Zülow). He won the Longines Global Champions Tour of Vienna Grand Prix on Plot Blue in September 2014.

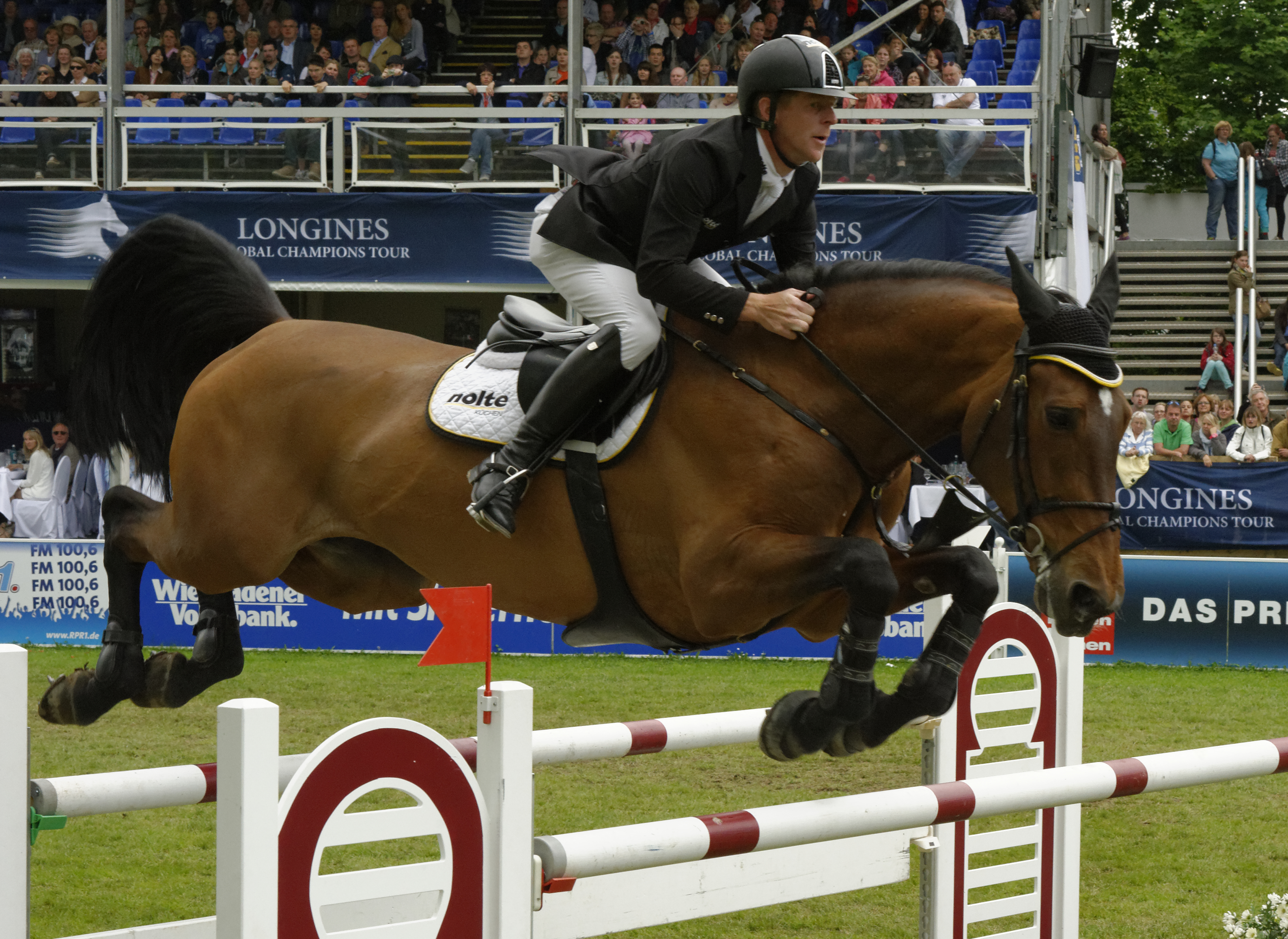
Marcus Ehning with Noltes Küchengirl at Internationalen PfingstTurnier Wiesbaden 2013

== Horses ==
Marcus Ehning joined the equestrian world when he was 7 years old. His firsts horses, which let him learn and take confidence in low and medium level shows, were Lord, Metal, Starlight, Queen and Bright Ruby. Then he started obtaining great results in higher level competitions mostly thanks to Orchidee, Opium and Talan. He reached the top level with For Pleasure and from that point he constantly grew with his horses, achieving victories in competitions worldwide. His top horses are Plot Blue, Cornado, Comme Il Faut, Singular LS La Silla, Gaudi and Sabrina. Beyond high level competitions, he also takes care of his young horses, training them day by day.

== Olympic record ==
Ehning participated at the 2000 Summer Olympics in Sydney, where he won a gold medal in Team Jumping, together with Lars Nieberg, Otto Becker and Ludger Beerbaum.

== International championship results ==
Results
| Year | Event | Horse | Placing | Notes | | | |
|---|---|---|---|---|---|---|---|
| 1993 | European Young Rider Championships | Talan | 1st place, gold medalist(s) | Team | | | |
| 1993 | European Young Rider Championships | Talan | 5th | Individual | | | |
| 1994 | European Young Rider Championships | Opium 002 | 1st place, gold medalist(s) | Team | kjnlm | 6th | Individual |
| 1994 | European Young Rider Championships | Opium 002 | 1995 | European Young Rider Championships | Opium 002 | 6th | Individual |
| 1999 | European Championships | For Pleasure | 1st place, gold medalist(s) | Team | | | |
| 1999 | European Championships | For Pleasure | 5th | Individual | | | |
| 2000 | Olympic Games | For Pleasure | 1st place, gold medalist(s) | Team | | | |
| 2000 | Olympic Games | For Pleasure | 4th | Individual | | | |
| 2001 | World Cup Final | For Pleasure | 31st | | | | |
| 2002 | World Cup Final | For Pleasure | 25th | | | | |
| 2002 | World Equestrian Games | For Pleasure | 4th | Team | | | |
| 2002 | World Equestrian Games | For Pleasure | 15th | Individual | | | |
| 2003 | World Cup Final | Anka 191 | 1st place, gold medalist(s) | | | | |
| 2003 | European Championships | For Pleasure | 1st place, gold medalist(s) | Team | | | |
| 2003 | European Championships | For Pleasure | 3rd place, bronze medalist(s) | Individual | | | |
| 2004 | World Cup Final | Anka 191 | 13th | | | | |
| 2005 | World Cup Final | Gitania 8 | 3rd place, bronze medalist(s) | | | | |
| 2005 | European Championships | Gitania 8 | 20th | Individual | | | |
| 2006 | World Cup Final | Sandro Boy | 1st place, gold medalist(s) | | | | |
| 2006 | World Equestrian Games | Noltes Kuchengirl | 3rd place, bronze medalist(s) | Team | | | |
| 2006 | World Equestrian Games | Noltes Kuchengirl | 82nd | Individual | | | |
| 2007 | World Cup Final | Gitania 8 | 5th | | | | |
| 2007 | European Championships | Noltes Kuchengirl | 2nd place, silver medalist(s) | Team | | | |
| 2007 | European Championships | Noltes Kuchengirl | 51st | Individual | | | |
| 2008 | World Cup Final | Sandro Boy | 39th | | | | |
| 2009 | World Cup Final | LeConte | 10th | | | | |
| 2009 | European Championships | Plot Blue | 3rd place, bronze medalist(s) | Team | | | |
| 2009 | European Championships | Plot Blue | 23rd | Individual | | | |
| 2010 | World Cup Final | Noltes Kuchengirl / Plot Blue | 1st place, gold medalist(s) | | | | |
| 2010 | World Equestrian Games | Plot Blue | 1st place, gold medalist(s) | Team | | | |
| 2010 | World Equestrian Games | Plot Blue | 16th | Individual | | | |
| 2011 | World Cup Final | Sabrina 327 | 20th | | | | |
| 2012 | World Cup Final | HH Copin van de Broy / Sabrina 327 | 7th | | | | |
| 2012 | Olympic Games | Plot Blue | 10th | Team | | | |
| 2012 | Olympic Games | Plot Blue | 12th | Individual | | | |
| 2013 | World Cup Final | HH Copin van de Broy / Plot Blue | 23rd | | | | |
| 2014 | World Cup Final | Cornado NRW | 4th | | | | |
| 2014 | World Equestrian Games | Cornado NRW | 4th | Team | | | |
| 2014 | World Equestrian Games | Cornado NRW | 10th | Individual | | | |
| 2015 | World Cup Final | Singular ls la Silla | RET | | | | |
| 2016 | World Cup Final | Cornado NRW | 4th | | | | |
| 2017 | World Cup Final | Pret a Tout | 12th | | | | |
| 2017 | European Championships | Pret a Tout | 5th | Team | | | |
| 2017 | European Championships | Pret a Tout | 6th | Individual | | | |
| 2018 | World Cup Final | Cornado NRW | 12th | | | | |
| 2018 | World Equestrian Games | Pret a Tout | 3rd place, bronze medalist(s) | Team | | | |
| 2018 | World Equestrian Games | Pret a Tout | 15th | Individual | | | |
| 2019 | European Championships | Comme il Faut 5 | 2nd place, silver medalist(s) | Team | | | |
| 2019 | European Championships | Comme il Faut 5 | 5th | Individual | | | |
| 2021 | European Championships | Stargold | 2nd place, silver medalist(s) | Team | | | |
| 2025 | European Championships | Coolio 42 | 3rd place, bronze medalist(s) | Team | | | |
| 2025 | European Championships | Coolio 42 | 19th | Individual | | | |
EL = Eliminated; RET = Retired; WD = Withdrew
