= Juan Carlos García (equestrian) =

Colombian equestrian (born 1967)

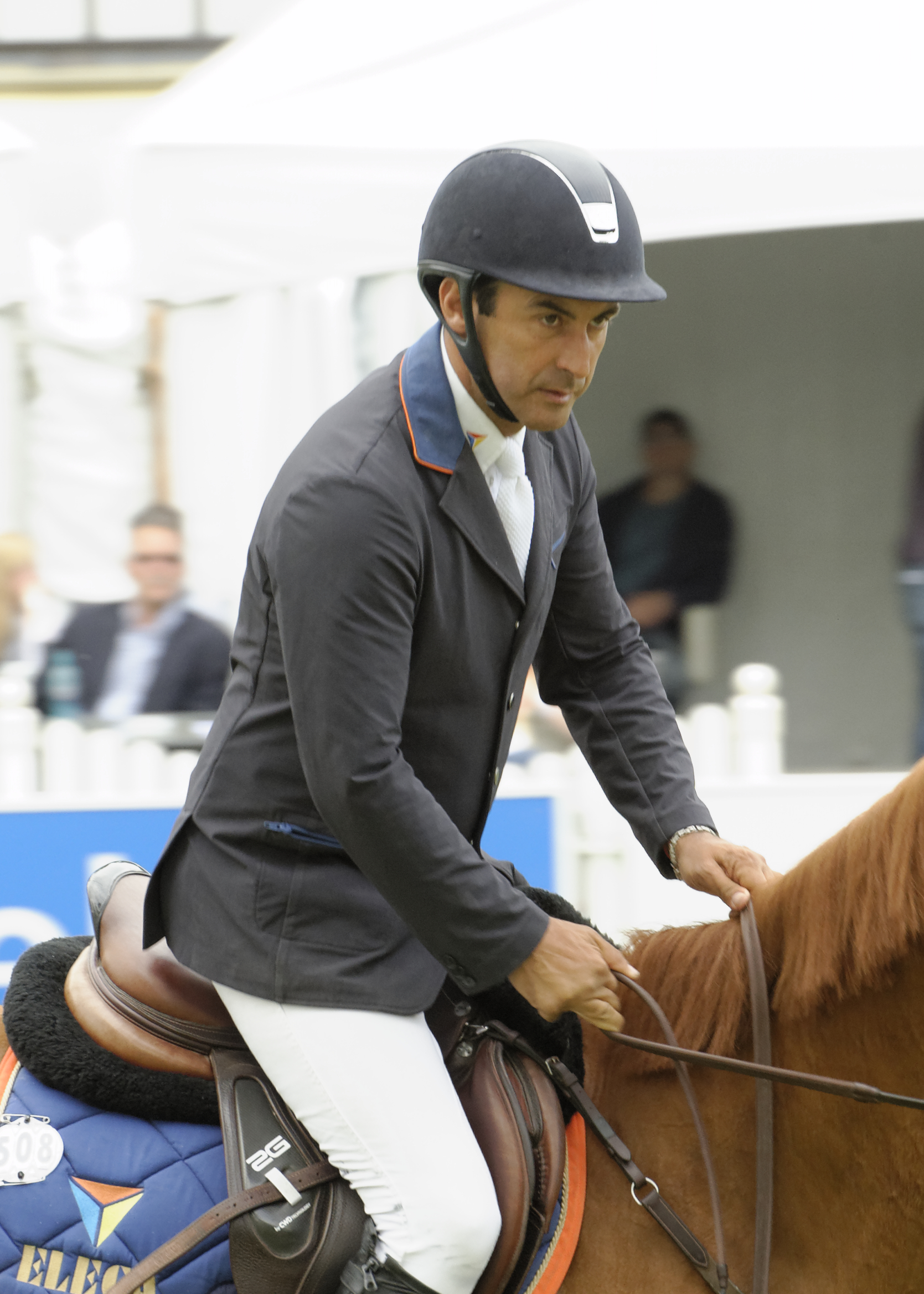

Personal information
- Nationality: Colombian
- Born: 6 October 1967 (age 58) Bogotá, Colombia

Sport
- Sport: Equestrian
Medal record
Equestrian
Representing Italy
European Championships
Silver medal – second place	2009 Fontainebleau	Team eventing

Juan Carlos García (born 6 October 1967) is a Colombian equestrian. He competed at the 1988 Summer Olympics and the 1992 Summer Olympics. He later represented Italy at the 2004 Summer Olympics.
