= Jean-Claude Van Geenberghe =

Belgian equestrian

Personal information
- Full name: Jean-Claude Van Geenberghe
- Nationality: Belgium & Ukraine (since 2006)
- Discipline: Show jumping
- Born: 17 November 1962; Kortrijk, Belgium
- Died: 9 May 2009 (aged 46); Donetsk, Ukraine
- Height: 5 ft 11 in (1.80 m)
- Weight: 161 lb (73 kg; 11 st 7 lb)

Jean-Claude Van Geenberghe (17 November 1962 – 9 May 2009) was a Belgian-Ukrainian equestrian who competed in the sport of show jumping. He competed in the 1998, 1992, and 2008 Summer Olympics.

While competing for Ukraine, Van Geenberghe resided in Donetsk. He died from heart attack and is buried in Belgium.
