= Christian Ahlmann =

German equestrian

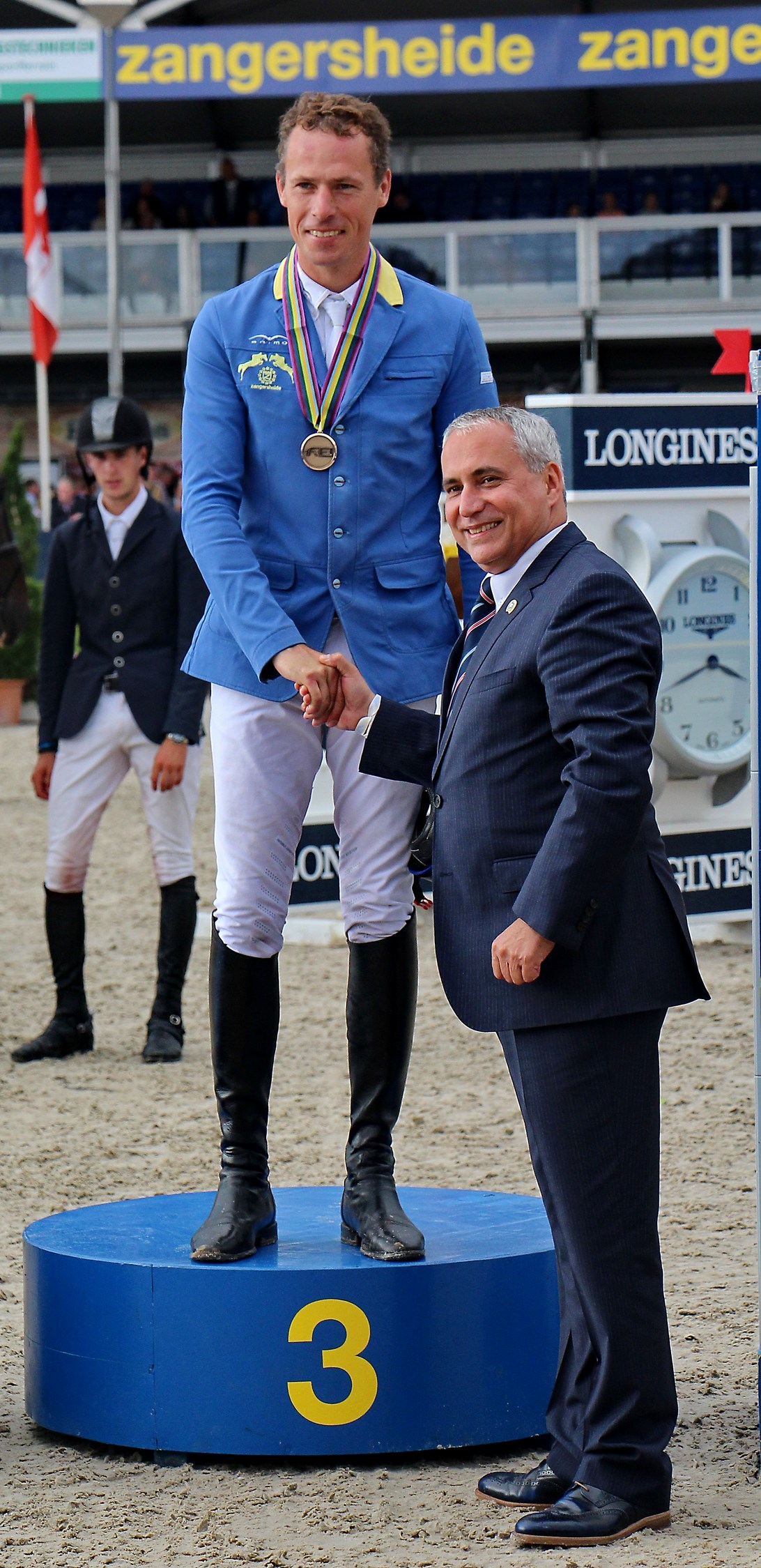

Personal information
- Nationality: German
- Discipline: Show jumping
- Born: 17 December 1974 (age 50); Marl, North Rhine-Westphalia, West Germany
- Height: 6 ft 2 in (1.88 m)
- Weight: 183 lb (83 kg; 13 st 1 lb)
Medal record
Representing Germany
Equestrian
Olympic Games
Bronze medal – third place	2004 Athens	Team jumping
Bronze medal – third place	2016 Rio de Janeiro	Team jumping
World Championships
Bronze medal – third place	2006 Aachen	Team jumping
European Championships
Gold medal – first place	2003 Donaueschingen	Individual jumping
Gold medal – first place	2003 Donaueschingen	Team jumping
Gold medal – first place	2005 San Patrignano	Team jumping
Silver medal – second place	2007 Mannheim	Team jumping
Silver medal – second place	2013 Herning	Team jumping
Silver medal – second place	2015 Aachen	Team jumping
Silver medal – second place	2019 Rotterdam	Team jumping

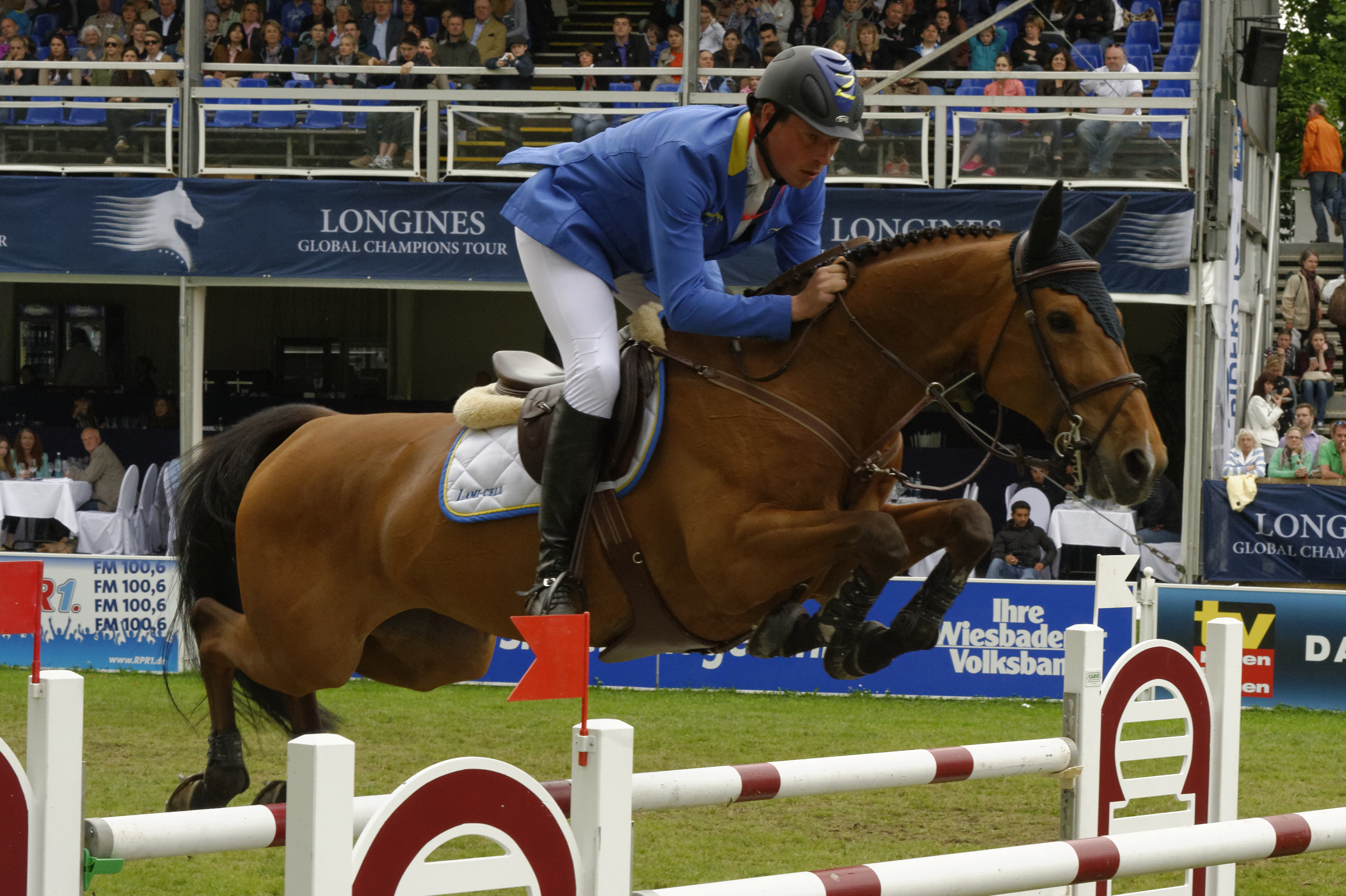
Internationalem PfingstTurnier Wiesbaden 2013

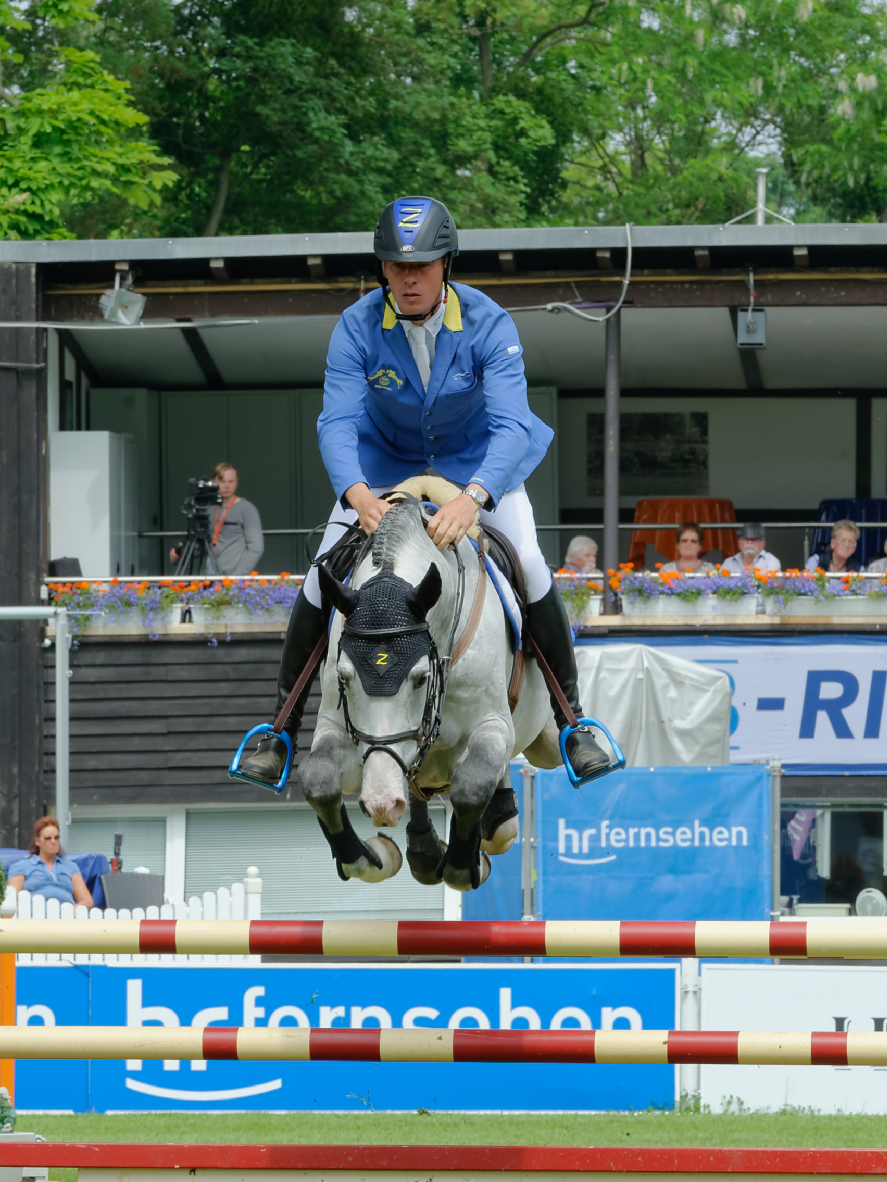
CSIYH Christian Ahlmann with Caribis Z at CSIYH* Wiesbaden 2015

Christian Ahlmann (born 17 December 1974 in Marl, North Rhine-Westphalia) is a German equestrian who competes in the sport of show jumping. He is married to Judy Ann Melchior (head of Zangersheide). He ranks first in the FEI Longines World Ranking List.

Ahlmann won the FEI Show Jumping World Cup with Taloubet Z in 2011. In 2014, he was the CHIO Aachen winner. He has won several medals with the German team at European Championships, World Championships and Olympic Games since 2003. Christian Ahlmann has been seen as an exceptional talent from an early age, being one of the youngest riders ever to receive the "goldenes Reitabzeichen", at age 14, and is today considered a calm, fine rider with a soft hand.

== Doping ==
During the 2008 Summer Olympics, Ahlmann's horse tested positive for the banned substance capsaicin along with the horses of four other riders, and was subsequently suspended from the Games. Because of the doping charge, the German Olympic Sports Confederation sent a bill to Ahlmann for his travel and accommodation costs at the Games. As a result of the doping offence, he was struck off the German 'A-Kader' list of elite riders for two years and returned to the German team in 2011.

== International championship results ==
Results
Year	Event	Horse	Placing	Notes
1993	European Young Rider Championships	Phanton	1st place, gold medalist(s)	Team
1993	European Young Rider Championships	Phanton	6th	Individual
1994	European Young Rider Championships	Aldatus	1st place, gold medalist(s)	Team
1994	European Young Rider Championships	Aldatus	2nd place, silver medalist(s)	Individual
1995	European Young Rider Championships	Satan du Tremblay	3rd place, bronze medalist(s)	Team
1995	European Young Rider Championships	Satan du Tremblay	15th	Individual
2003	World Cup Final	Coster	13th	
2003	European Championships	Coster	1st place, gold medalist(s)	Team
2003	European Championships	Coster	1st place, gold medalist(s)	Individual
2004	Olympic Games	Coster	3rd place, bronze medalist(s)	Team
2004	Olympic Games	Coster	45th	Individual
2005	European Championships	Coster	5th	Individual
2006	World Equestrian Games	Coster	3rd place, bronze medalist(s)	Team
2006	World Equestrian Games	Coster	37th	Individual
2007	World Cup Final	Coster	6th	
2007	European Championships	Coster	2nd place, silver medalist(s)	Team
2007	European Championships	Coster	8th	Individual
2008	Olympic Games	Coster	DSQ	Team
2008	Olympic Games	Coster	DSQ	Individual
2011	World Cup Final	Taloubet Z	1st place, gold medalist(s)	
2012	World Cup Final	Taloubet Z	34th	
2012	Olympic Games	Codex One	10th	Team
2012	Olympic Games	Codex One	64th	Individual
2013	World Cup Final	Taloubet Z	32nd	
2013	European Championships	Codex One	2nd place, silver medalist(s)	Team
2013	European Championships	Codex One	12th	Individual
2013	World Young Horse Championships	Cartello Z	25th	5 Year Olds
2013	World Young Horse Championships	Number One 26	32nd	5 Year Olds
2013	World Young Horse Championships	Caruso 472	16th	7 Year Olds
2014	World Cup Final	Aragon Z	14th	
2014	World Equestrian Games	Codex One	4th	Team
2014	World Equestrian Games	Codex One	30th	Individual
2014	World Young Horse Championships	Air Jordan Alpha Z	13th	5 Year Olds
2014	World Young Horse Championships	Hui Buh 7	1st place, gold medalist(s)	6 Year Olds
2014	World Young Horse Championships	Casuality Z	2nd place, silver medalist(s)	7 Year Olds
2014	World Young Horse Championships	Caribis Z	8th	7 Year Olds
2015	European Championships	Taloubet Z	2nd place, silver medalist(s)	Team
2015	European Championships	Taloubet Z	7th	Individual
2016	World Cup Final	Colorit / Taloubet Z	6th	
2016	Olympic Games	Taloubet Z	3rd place, bronze medalist(s)	Team
2016	Olympic Games	Taloubet Z	9th	Individual
2016	World Young Horse Championships	Corico Z	28th	5 Year Olds
2016	World Young Horse Championships	Cornwell 9	7th	6 Year Olds
2016	World Young Horse Championships	Dominator 2000 Z	23rd	6 Year Olds
2016	World Young Horse Championships	Comilfo Plus Z	23rd	7 Year Olds
2018	World Young Horse Championships	Solid Gold Z	1st place, gold medalist(s)	7 Year Olds
2018	World Young Horse Championships	Zampano Z	6th	7 Year Olds
2019	World Cup Final	Clintrexo Z	14th	
2019	European Championships	Clintrexo Z	2nd place, silver medalist(s)	Team
2019	European Championships	Clintrexo Z	27th	Individual
EL = Eliminated; RET = Retired; DSQ = Disqualified
