= Ricardo Kierkegaard =

Argentine equestrian

Personal information
- Born: 10 December 1952 (age 72); Buenos Aires, Argentina

Sport
- Sport: Equestrian

Ricardo Kierkegaard (born 10 December 1952) is an Argentine equestrian. He competed in two events at the 1996 Summer Olympics.
