= Marcela Lobo Pérez =

Mexican equestrian

Personal information
- Born: 18 May 1984 (age 40); Monterrey, Mexico

Sport
- Sport: Equestrian

Marcela Lobo Pérez (born 18 May 1984) is a Mexican equestrian. She competed in two events at the 2004 Summer Olympics.
