= Katharina Offel =

German equestrian

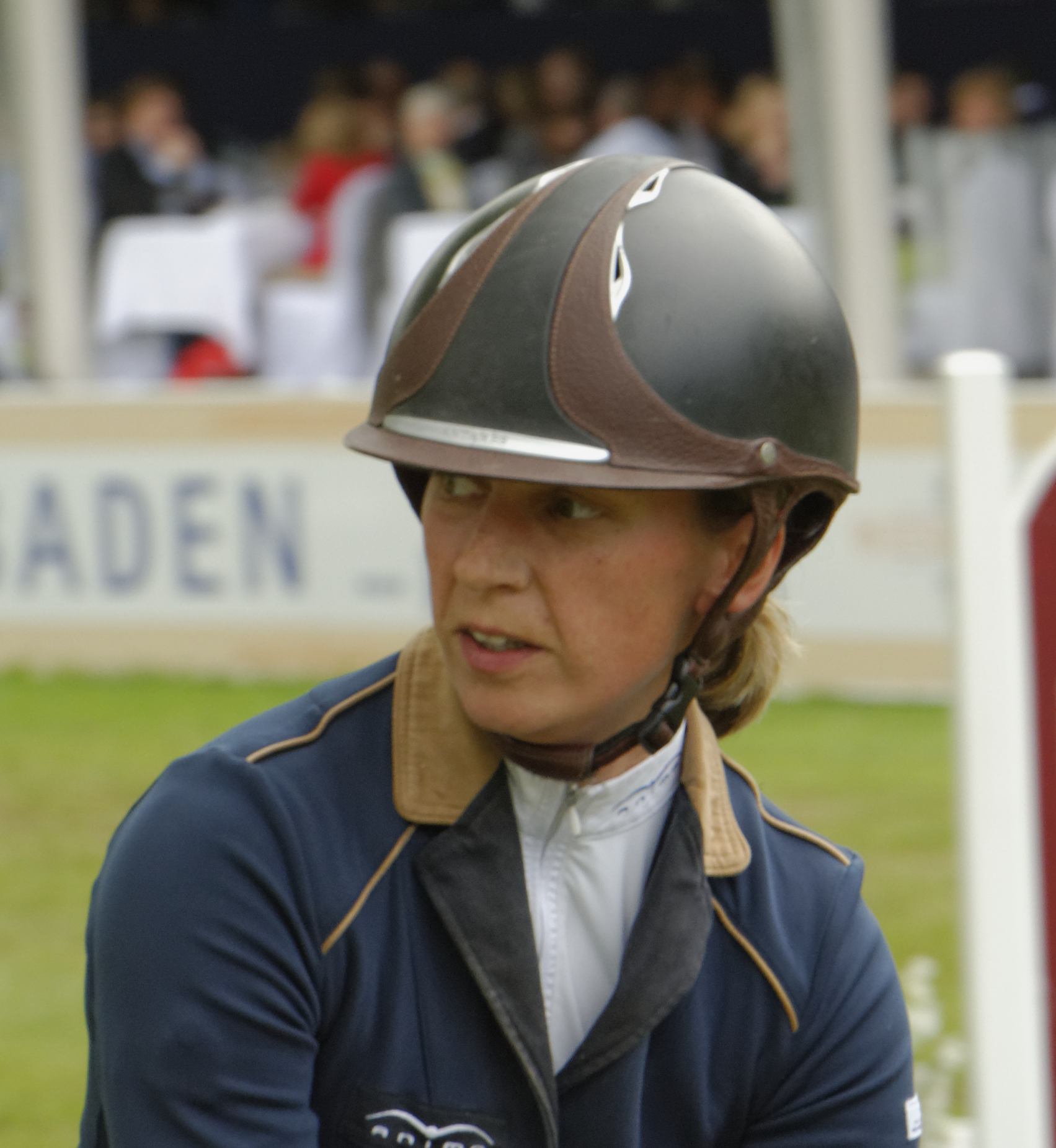
- Offel in 2013

Personal information
- Born: 8 December 1976 (age 49) Rosenheim, West Germany

Sport
- Sport: Horse riding
- Event: Showjumping

Katharina Offel (born 31 July 1982) is a German equestrian who competed in showjumping for the Ukrainian team for the majority of her career.
