= Beat Mändli =

Swiss equestrian

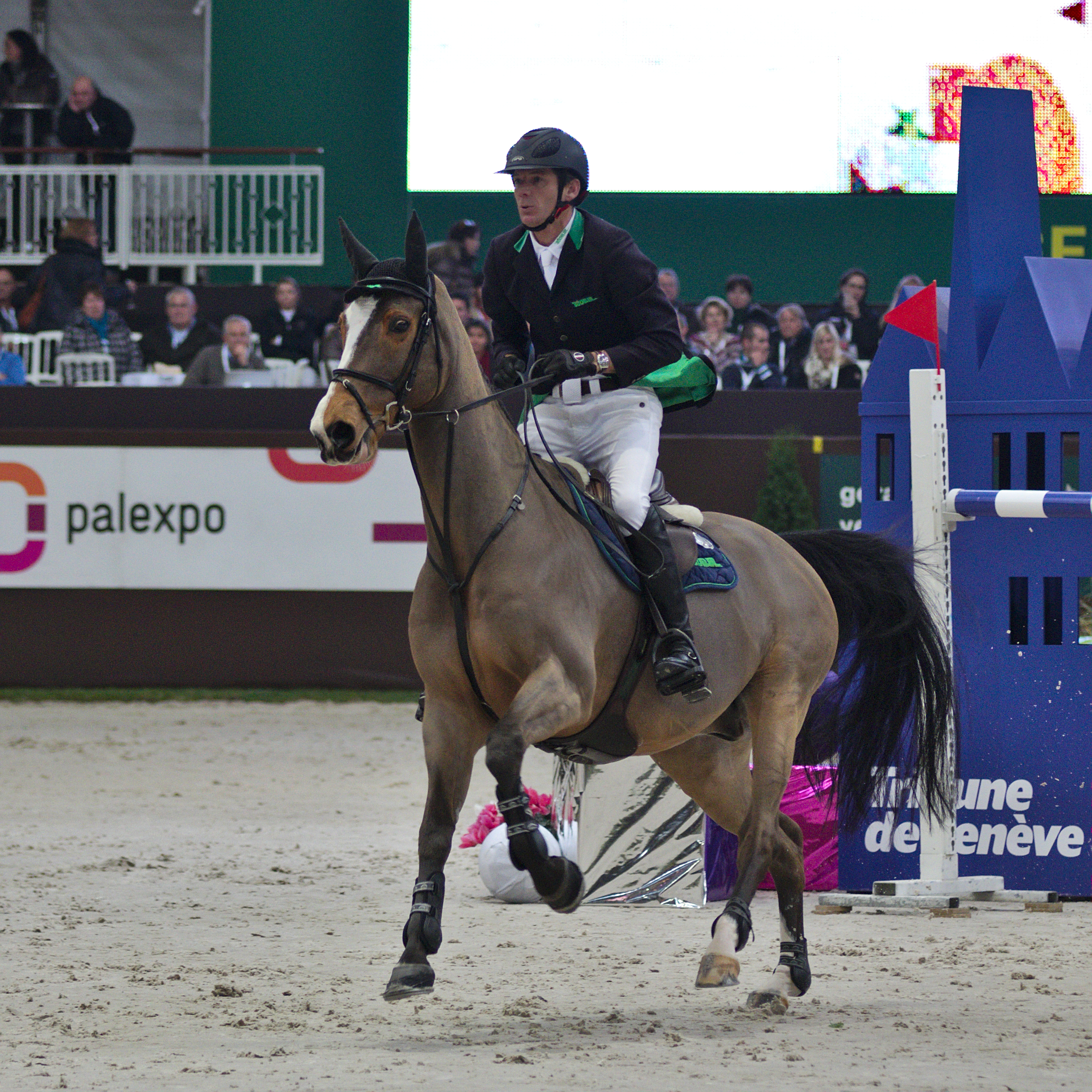

Medal record

Equestrian

Representing Switzerland

Olympic Games
Silver medal – second place	2000 Sydney	Team jumping

Beat Mändli (born 1 October 1969) is a Swiss equestrian and Olympic medalist. He won a silver medal in show jumping at the 2000 Summer Olympics in Sydney.
