= Björn Nagel =

Ukrainian equestrian

Personal information
- Nationality: Germany & Ukraine
- Discipline: Show jumping
- Born: January 25, 1978; Holstein, West Germany
- Height: 188 cm (6 ft 2 in)
- Weight: 80 kg (176 lb)

Björn Nagel (born January 25, 1978) is a German-Ukrainian equestrian who competes in the sport of show jumping. He competed for Ukraine at the 2008 Summer Olympics, where he did not finish in the individual portion and took tenth with his teammates in the team portion. At the 2012 Summer Olympics, he finished in 41st place in the individual even, dropping out of the competition in the third round, and 14th in the team portion.
