= Cassio Rivetti =

Brazilian-born equestrian (1980)

Personal information
- Nationality: Brazil / Ukraine
- Discipline: Jumping
- Born: 20 February 1980 (age 46)
- Height: 1.75 m (5 ft 9 in)
- Weight: 65 kg (143 lb)

Cassio Rivetti (Ukrainian: Кассіо Ріветті, Kassio Rivetti; born 20 February 1980) is an Olympic show jumping rider. Born in Brazil, Rivetti has represented Ukraine since 2009 and competed at two Summer Olympics (in 2012 and 2016). His best Olympic result is 12th place in the individual jumping from 2012.

Rivetti participated at three World Equestrian Games (in 2006, 2010 and 2014) and at two European Show Jumping Championships (in 2009 and 2015). He finished 8th individually at the 2014 World Games, while his best team performance is also 8th place from 2015 European Championships.
