= Sapphire (horse) =

American show jumper

- Sapphire and Mark Watring
- Breed: Holsteiner
- Sire: Liostro
- Grandsire: Ladykiller XX
- Dam: Manolita
- Maternal grandsire: Roman
- Sex: Gelding
- Foaled: April 15, 1992 (age 32)
- Country: United States
- Colour: Dapple Grey
- Breeder: Bernd Bockhold, Germany
- Owner: Mark Watring and Dr. & Mrs. John Bohannan
- Trainer: Mark Watring Stables
- Last updated on: June 29, 2010.

Sapphire (born April 15, 1992) was a Holsteiner gelding who competed in Olympic show jumping, and 2003 Pan American Games gold medalist.

== Career ==
On May 27, 2002, Sapphire won $35,000 Lexus of Glendale Memorial Grand Prix prize money, at the Memorial Day Classic Horse Show. Sapphire bested a field of 25 starters with a double clear rounds and the fastest time in the jump off of 41.176 seconds. This win moved Sapphire into fourth place standing for American Grand Prix Association's "Horse of the Year", and Mark Watring "AGA (American Grand Prix Association) Rider".

== Awards ==
2003, 2003 Pan American Games | Equestrian Individual Gold Medalist

== Clone: "Saphir" ==
In 2008 Replica Farms, which represents Austin, Texas–based ViaGen partnered with Sapphire's owners to produce a clone. Replica Farms, Inc. first produced clones of cutting horse Royal Blue Boon in 2005.

Successful cloning was completed in 2010. On February 11, 2010, the cloned foal was born in Amarillo, Texas. The new colt is named "Saphir".

== See also ==
- Show jumping
- Holsteiner
- Warmblood
- Cloning
- List of animals that have been cloned
