= Jamie Kermond =

Australian show jumper (born 1985)

Personal information
- Born: Jamie Kermond; 23 June 1985 (age 41)

Sport
- Country: Australia
- Sport: Equestrian
- Event: Show jumping

Jamie Kermond (born 23 June 1985) is an Australian show jumper.

== Personal life ==
Kermond was born in Warrnambool, Victoria and along with his wife, fellow showjumper Jamie Winning-Kermond and son Hudson, now lives in the Hawkesbury region of Sydney.

== Career ==
Kermond represented Australia at the 2006 World Equestrian Games in Aachen, the 2014 World Equestrian Games in Caen, as well as the 2018 World Equestrian Games in Tryon. He also took part at two World Cup Finals (in 2014 and 2018). In 2016 and 2017, Kermond won the Australian National Championships with his horse Yandoo Oaks Constellation (more commonly known as Napa), and in 2018 headed to the Hong Kong Masters where he and Napa placed 4th in the CSI5* Grand Prix, before heading to the World Cup Finals and the World Equestrian Games.

On 30 June 2021, Kermond and Yandoo Oaks Constellation were announced as being selected for the Australian squad to compete in the delayed 2020 Summer Games in Tokyo. After returning a positive drug test for cocaine he was provisionally suspended on 21 July 2021, and removed from the Olympic team. Citing the disruption caused to the rest of the Australian team, Kermond received the maximum penalty for the positive test, a two year ban.
