= Gerfried Puck =

Austrian show jumping rider (born 1973)

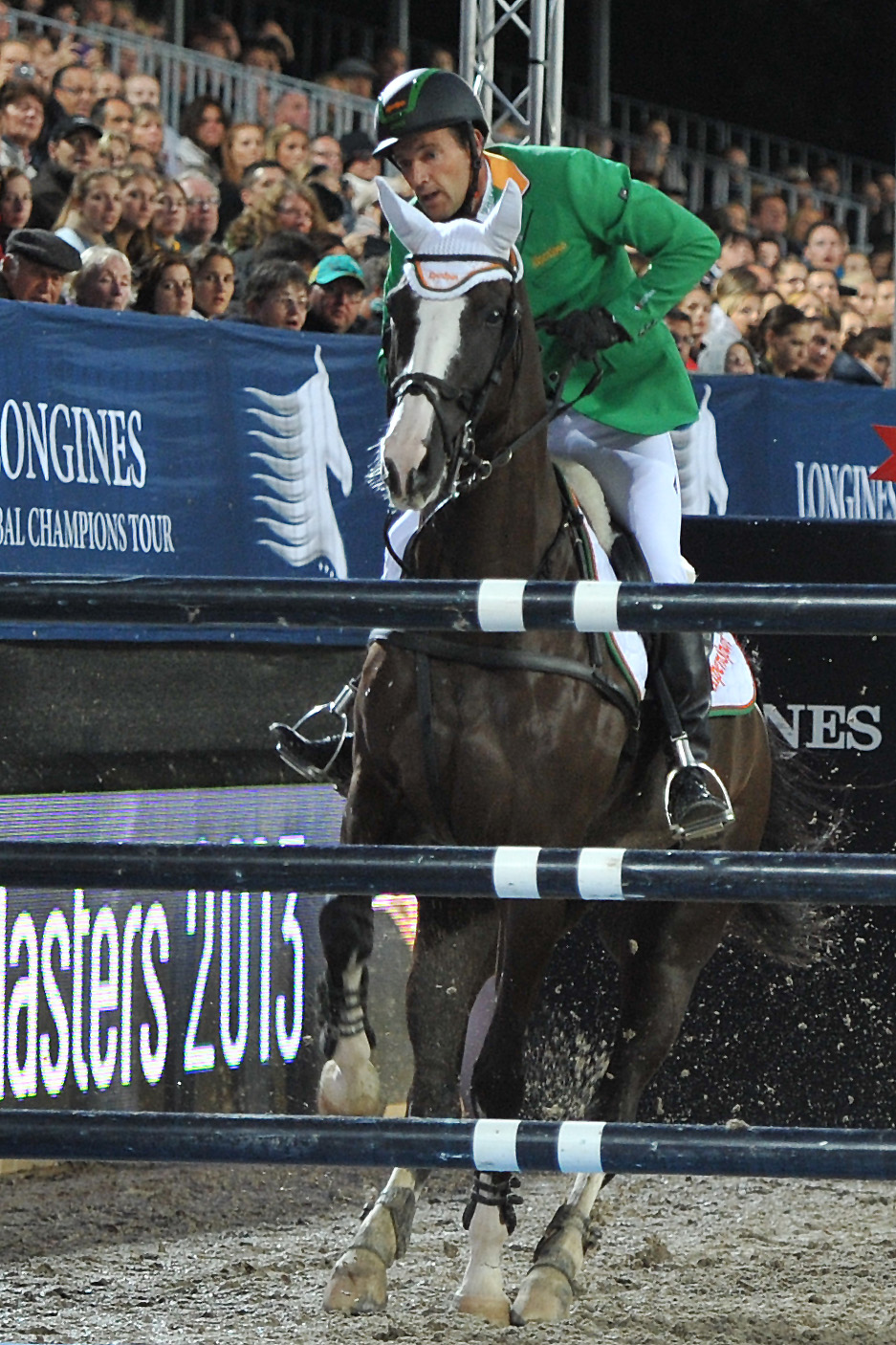
- Puck in 2013

Personal information
- Full name: Gerfried Puck
- Nationality: Austria
- Discipline: Jumping
- Born: 22 February 1973 (age 52); Klagenfurt, Austria
Medal record
Representing Austria
European Championships
Bronze medal – third place	2023 Milan	Team jumping

Gerfried Puck (born 22 February 1973) is an Austrian show jumping rider who competed at the 2024 Summer Olympics.

== Career ==
He competed at the 2024 Summer Olympics in Paris, France, where he placed 59th in the individual competition and 13th in the team competition. He was also part of the Austrian team at the 2023 Show-Jumping European Championships in Milan, Italy, where they won a bronze team medal.

In 2025 he announced that will start to represent Hungary as a show jumping rider.
