= Manuel Torres (equestrian) =

Colombian equestrian

Personal information
- Nationality: Colombian
- Born: 17 March 1957 (age 68); Cartagena, Colombia

Sport
- Sport: Equestrian

Manuel Torres (born 17 March 1957) is a Colombian equestrian. He competed at five Olympic Games for Columbia.

Olympic Appearances

- 1988 Summer Olympics: Seoul, South Korea
  - Horse Zalme, Result AC r2/2
- 1992 Summer Olympics: Barcelona, Spain
  - Horse, Kos, Results 64 r1/2 individual, 18th Team
- 1996 Summer Olympics: Atlanta, USA
  - Horse, Cartagena, Result 40 r1/2
- 2000 Summer Olympics: Sydney, Australia
  - Horse, Marco, Result 14th
- 2008 Summer Olympics: Beijing, China
  - Horse, Chambucanero AC r1/2

As of August 2022, Torres was on Temporary Restriction by the United States Center for SafeSport, following allegations of misconduct, and subject to: “coaching/ training restriction(s); no unsupervised coaching/training; and no contact directive(s).”
