= Hervé Godignon =

French equestrian

Medal record

Equestrian

Representing France

Olympic Games
Bronze medal – third place	1992 Barcelona	Team jumping

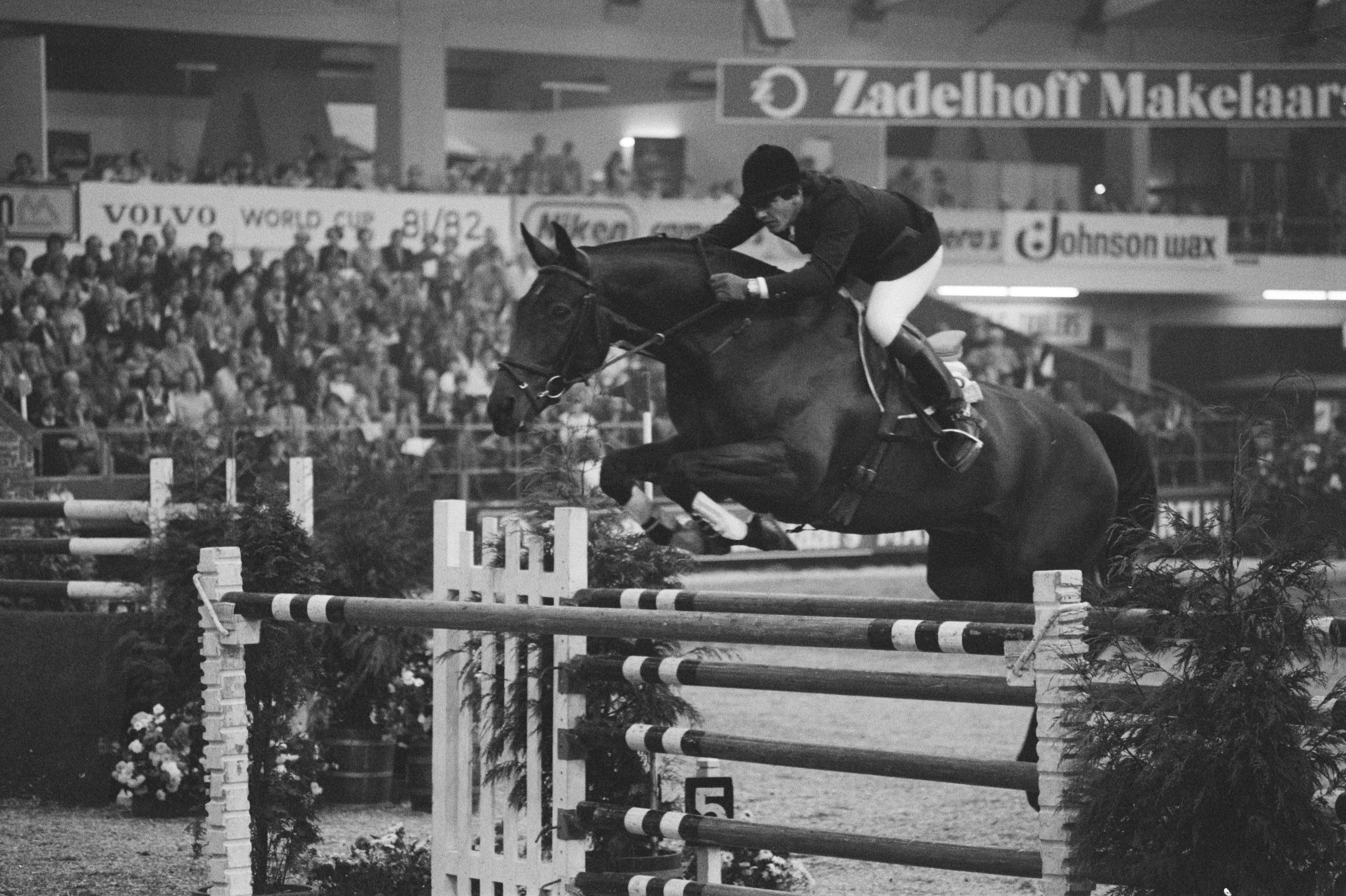
Hervé Godignon in 1981

Hervé Godignon (born 22 April 1952) is a French equestrian and Olympic medalist. He was born in Paris. He won a bronze medal in show jumping at the 1992 Summer Olympics in Barcelona.
