= Chris Pratt (show jumping rider) =

Canadian show jumping rider (born 1969)

Personal information
- Nationality: Canada
- Discipline: Show jumping
- Born: April 18, 1969 (age 57); Belfountain, Ontario, Canada

Chris Pratt (born April 18, 1969) is a Canadian show jumping rider. He represented Canada in the 2006 FEI World Equestrian Games in Aachen, Germany. Pratt was announced on the 2011 Canadian Show jumping Equestrian Team Short List, and Canada's Long list for the 2011 Pan American Games.

== Early life ==
Chris Pratt was born in Belfountain, Ontario. At a very young age, Pratt showed a keen interest in horses. When his father inherited a farm north of Toronto, Ontario, Canada, Pratt finally got his wish to have a horse of his own. His father traded four goats for what would become a lifelong commitment to the sport of show jumping. The first sign that Pratt was destined to be a strong competitor came in 1994 when he topped the Kanatek Talent Squad and also won the Firestone Development Scholarship. In 2025, he placed second and third in separate $120,000 CSI3* Grand Prix events in Wellington, Florida, riding Ideaal ES, and won the $25,000 CPKC National Grand Prix at the Winter Equestrian Festival.

Pratt currently lives in Los Angeles, California where he rides and coaches at his own barn, Epic Stables.

== Career ==
Pratt's results for 2011 have been;

- 1st Place in the $31,000 Husky Energy Cup, Spruce Meadows, AB
- 1st Place in the $100,000 Grand Prix of Del Mar, Del Mar National Horse Show, CA
- 2nd Place in the $31,000 HITS Welcome Classic, CSI2*-W HITS Thermal II, CA.
