= Ricardo Jurado =

Spanish equestrian

Personal information
- Nationality: Spanish
- Born: 17 April 1972 (age 54) Seville, Spain

Sport
- Sport: Equestrian

Ricardo Jurado (born 17 April 1972) is a Spanish equestrian. He competed in two events at the 2000 Summer Olympics.
