= Shutterfly (horse) =

Champion German show jumper

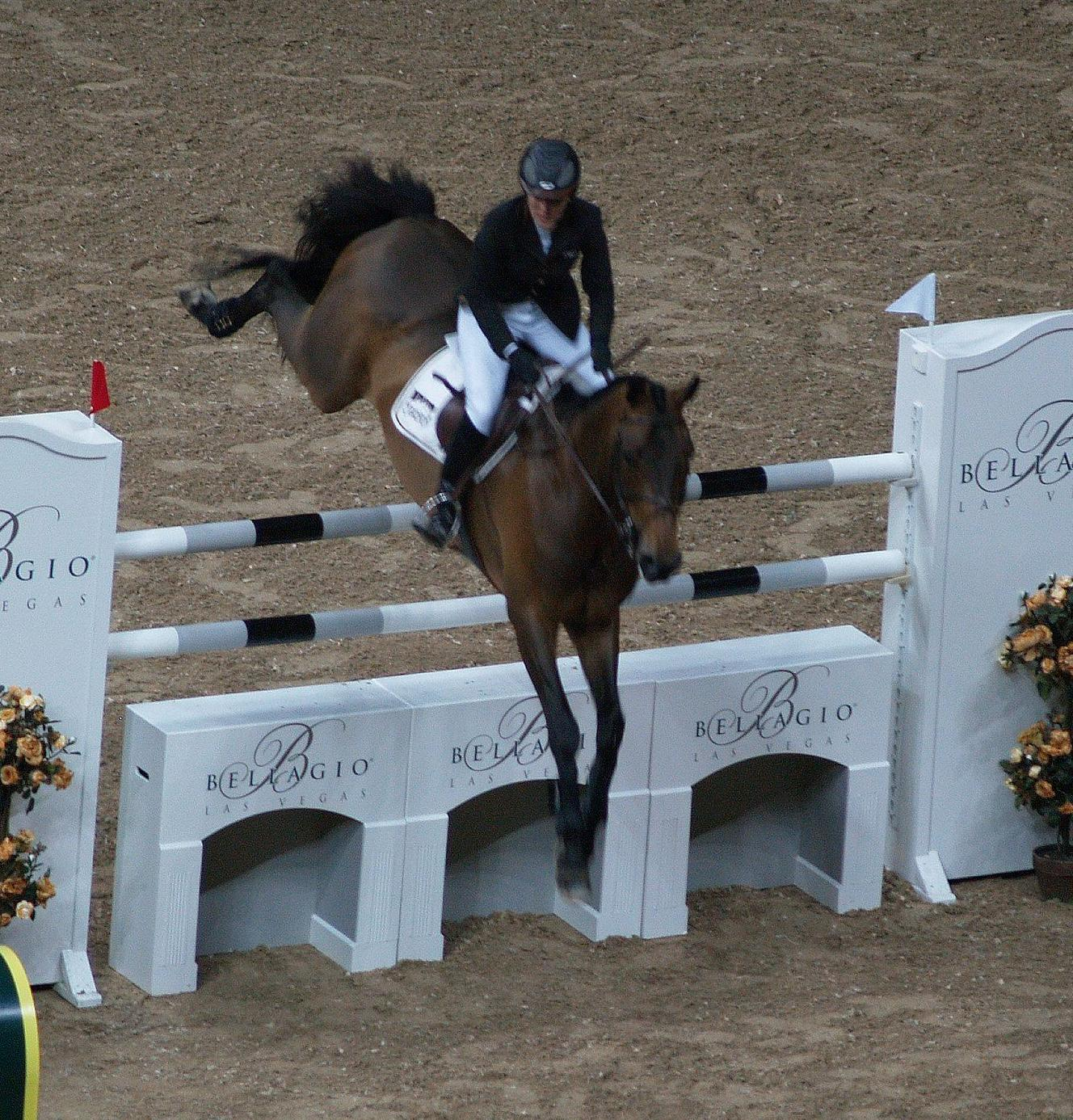
- Meredith Michaels-Beerbaum with Shutterfly, 2007 World Cup Final in Las Vegas, NV, USA
- Breed: Hanoverian horse
- Discipline: Show jumping
- Sire: Silvio I
- Dam: Famm
- Maternal grandsire: Forrest XX
- Sex: Gelding
- Foaled: 1993
- Died: 2023
- Country: Germany
- Breeder: Uwe Dreesmann
- Owner: Meredith Michaels-Beerbaum and Octavia Farms LLC (Nancy Clark)
- Trainer: Carsten Raschen (first trainer)
- Rider: Meredith Michaels-Beerbaum

Earnings
- 3.520.864 €

Major wins
- 2005, 2008 and 2009 Show Jumping World Cup Finals

Awards
- 2007 FEI Horse of the Year

Shutterfly (January 14, 1993 — January 28, 2023) was a Hanoverian gelding ridden in competition by Meredith Michaels-Beerbaum. Considered the "ultimate jumping horse", Shutterfly won medals at several World and European Championships, placing first in the World Cup final three times. With lifetime winnings of €3,520,864, he was the most successful show jumper of the 2000s and one of the highest earning show jumpers of all time.

== Background ==
Shutterfly, originally named Struwwelpeter, was foaled on January 14, 1993 at the farm of Uwe Dresmann. He was trained by Carsten Raschen as a five and six year old, where he qualified for the National Championships.

Meredith Michaels-Beerbaum discovered the horse when he was six years old, after finding him in a competition for young show jumping horses. Michaels-Beerbam eventually encouraged Uwe Dresmann to sell him, and he was purchased by Nancy Clark. After he was sold, his name was changed to Shutterfly. His barn name was Petey.

As a young horse, Shutterfly was challenging to ride. He was described as "spooky" and "frightened of everything". At seven years old, Michaels-Beerbaum entered Shutterfly in the finals of CHIO Aachen, which ended disastrously after Michaels-Beerbaum fell off. It would take Michaels-Beerbaum a year to regain the horse's trust. By 1999, Michaels-Beerbaum credited Shutterfly with helping her top the FEI World Show Jumping rankings.

As Shutterfly developed into a champion show jumper, he remained insecure and nervous in the show ring. Michaels-Beerbaum noted his bashfulness, compared to other show jumpers. His insecurity left him sheltering behind his groom as he entered the arena, who would use music to soothe him.

After placing second at the 2004 World Cup final in Milan, Shutterfly tested positive for the banned substance acepromazine. As a result, Michaels-Beerbaum was not selected for the 2004 Summer Olympics in Athens. The decision was controversial at the time. The positive ruling was overturned months later and Shutterfly returned to competition in 2005. Two weeks after the decision was overturned, Michaels-Beerbaum and Shutterfly won the 2005 World Cup Finals in Los Vegas.

At the 2006 World Equestrian Games, Shutterfly was rattled during the final four horse rotation phase, reacting "extremely nervous and upset". When changing riders, Shutterfly began rearing in the practice area. The horse's reaction caused some commentators to question the necessity of the horse rotation round. Michaels-Beerbaum would not bring Shutterfly back to the World Equestrian Games, and the horse change was eventually eliminated from the format.

In 2007, Shutterfly tested positive in a doping test at the European Championships in Mannheim for the use of Triamcinolone, a corticosteroid. The medication use was disclosed to stewards before the event and was allowed to start.

In 2008, the pair were selected for the Summer Olympics in Beijing, and were expected to be medal finalists going into the competition. The combination eventually placed fourth in the individual competition. The next year, Michaels-Beerbaum and Shutterfly won every round of their competition at the 2009 World Cup Finals in Las Vegas, winning the gold medal. It was the third World Cup Finals the pair would win together.

In 2011, at the age of 18 Shutterfly won the Warsteiner Prize at CHIO Aachen. After the win, Michaels-Beerbaum's husband Marcus Beerbaum encouraged her to retire Shutterfly, to end his career on a high note. A few days later, Shutterfly was retired in a ceremony at CHIO Aachen.

After retiring from competition, Shutterfly went to live at the Beerbaums’ German base in Thedinghausen, Germany. On 28 January 2023 Shutterfly died at the age of 30.

== Top results ==
- First place, 2003 Olympia Grand Prix
- Individual gold medal and team silver medal, 2007 European Show Jumping Championships in Mannheim
- Gold medals, 2005, 2008 and 2009 Show Jumping World Cup finals
- Individual and team bronze medals, 2006 World Equestrian Games
- First place, 2008 and 2010 Stuttgart Mercedes German Masters Championship
- First place, 2005 Aachen Grand Prix
- First place, 2006 Stuttgart Grand Prix
- Top placed horse and rider combination in the world, 2004 and 2006
