= Meredith Michaels-Beerbaum =

German equestrian

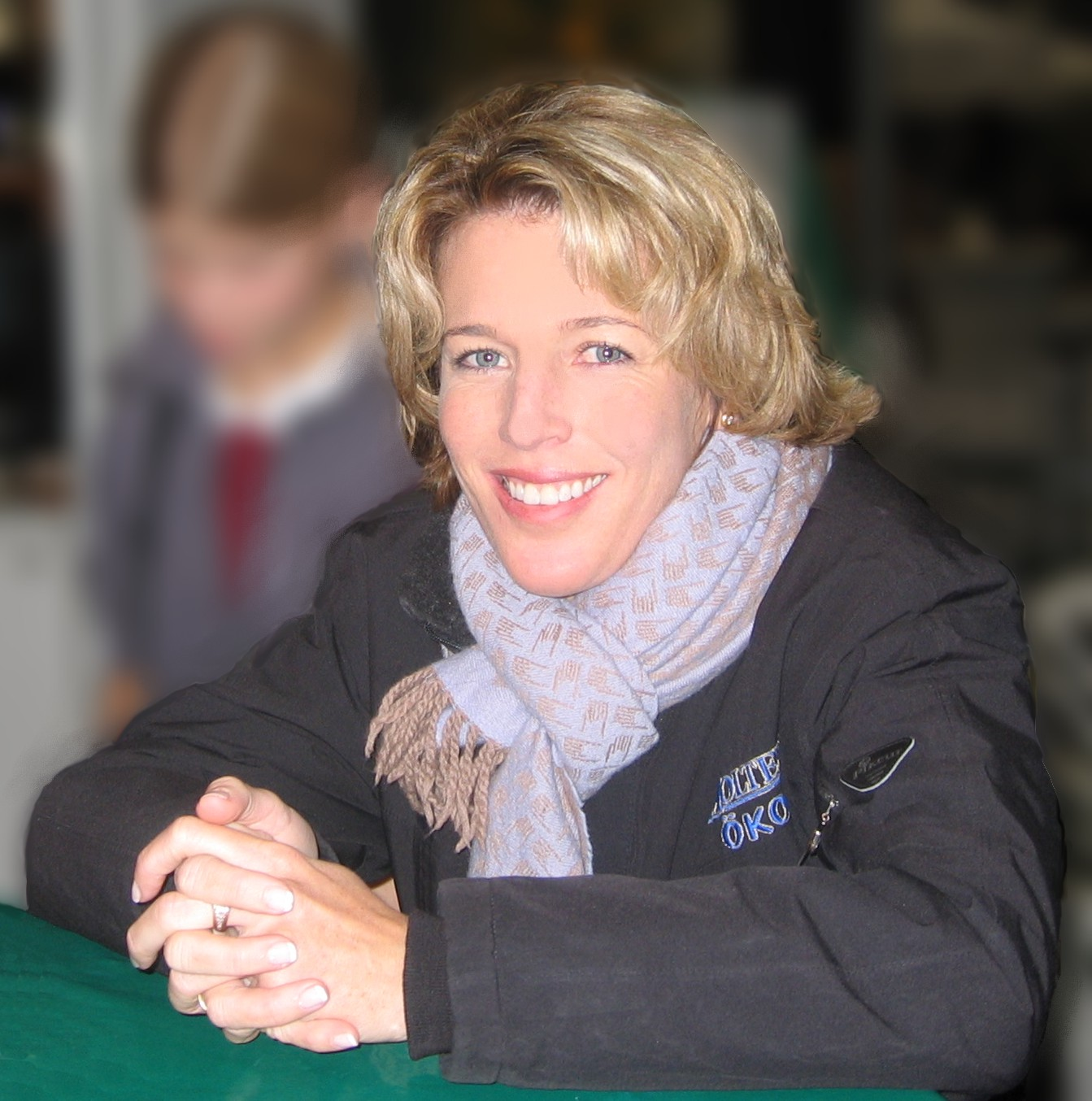

Personal information
- Nationality: Germany
- Discipline: Show jumping
- Born: 26 December 1969 (age 55); Los Angeles, California
- Height: 5 ft 4 in (1.63 m)
- Weight: 110 lb (50 kg; 7 st 12 lb)

Website
- www.michaelsbeerbaum.com
Medal record
Equestrian
Representing Germany
Olympic Games
Bronze medal – third place	2016 Rio de Janeiro	Team jumping
World Championships
Gold medal – first place	2010 Kentucky	Team jumping
Bronze medal – third place	2006 Aachen	Individual jumping
Bronze medal – third place	2006 Aachen	Team jumping
European Championships
Gold medal – first place	1999 Hickstead	Team jumping
Gold medal – first place	2005 San Patrignano	Team jumping
Gold medal – first place	2007 Mannheim	Individual jumping
Silver medal – second place	2007 Mannheim	Team jumping
Silver medal – second place	2015 Aachen	Team jumping
Bronze medal – third place	2009 Windsor	Team jumping

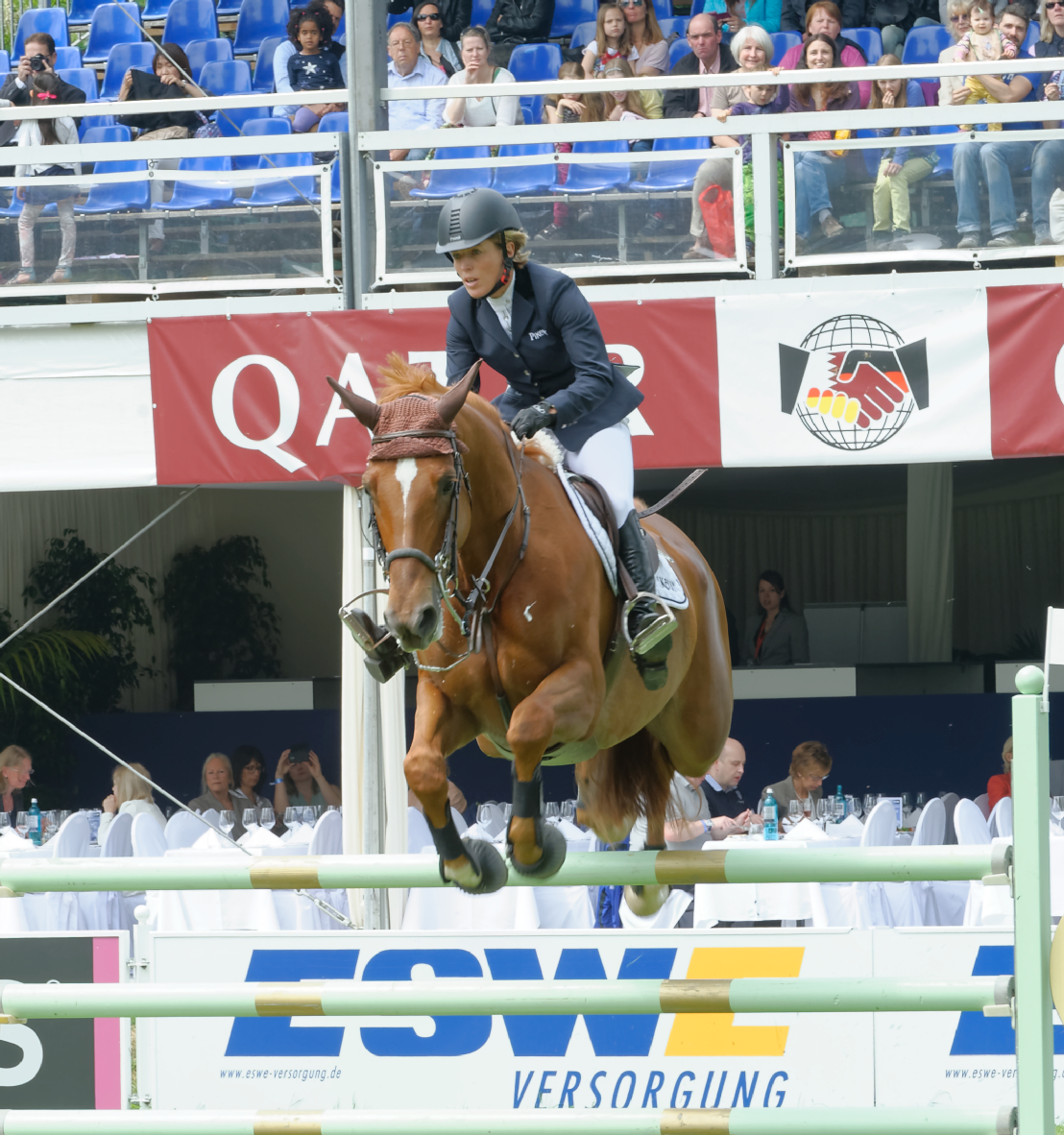
Meredith Michaels-Beerbaum with Tequila de Lile at CSIYH* Wiesbaden 2015

Meredith Michaels-Beerbaum (born 26 December 1969) is an American-born German equestrian who competes at the international level in show jumping.

== Career ==
She grew up riding ponies and had a successful career as a Young Rider, both in equitation and in show jumping. As a young-adult, Michaels-Beerbaum studied political science at Princeton University, continuing to compete during her college years. She then went to train in Germany with Paul Schockemöhle in 1991, planning to remain only for a summer, which eventually turned into a permanent stay. She decided to buy the training center in Balve.

== Personal life ==
She was born in Los Angeles, California, and is the daughter of film director Richard Michaels and actor Kristina Hansen.

Following her marriage to the well-known German show jumper Markus Beerbaum in 1998, she changed her citizenship. Together the Beerbaums have one daughter, Brianne Victoria Beerbaum, born in 2010. Through her marriage, Michaels-Beerbaum is also sister-in-law to Ludger Beerbaum, who has won multiple Olympic and championship medals in show jumping.

== Horses ==
=== Current ===
- Unbelievable (born 2001), Dutch Warmblood, Dark bay gelding, sired by Manhattan, damsire Democraat
- Fibonacci (born 2005), Swedish Warmblood, Grey gelding, sired by For Feeling, damsire Corland
- Atlanta (born 2005), Dutch Warmblood, Chestnut mare, sired by For Pleasure, damsire Achill-Libero H
- Comanche (born 2006), Oldenburg, Grey gelding, sired by Coupe de Coeur, damsire Baloubet du Rouet

=== Previous ===
- Bella Donna (born 2003), Holsteiner horse, Dark bay mare, sired by Baldini II, damsire Calido I
- Quick Star (1982–2011), Selle Français, Dark bay stallion, sired by Galoubet A, damsire Stella v. Nithard
- Shutterfly (born 1993), Hanoverian horse, Darkbay gelding, sired by Silvio I, damsire Forrest xx
- Kismet (Benedicte) (born 2001), Belgian Warmblood, Liver chestnut mare, sired by Kannan, damsire Furioso II
- Stella (born 1989), Dark bay mare, sired by Quick Star, damsire Wilson
- Le Mans (born 1995), Chestnut gelding, sired by Leubus, damsire Landadel
- Malou (born 2004), Grey mare, sired by Maloubet de Pleville, damsire Carthago
- Cantano (born 2000), Holsteiner horse, Bay stallion, sired by Cascavelle, damsire Acor
- Checkmate (born 1995), Hanoverian, Darkbay gelding, sired by Contender, damsire Pik Bube II

== Achievements ==
- Gold medal team member, 9th individually, at the 1999 European Championships in Hickstead, England (Stella)
- 5th place at the 2006 World Cup Final in Kuala Lumpur (Checkmate 4)
- Gold medal winner of the 2005 World Cup Final in Las Vegas, NV (Shutterfly)
- Silver medal at the 2004 World Cup Final in Milan, Italy (Shutterfly)
- Nations Cup starts:27 Wins:8
- Ladies German Championships Gold Medal in 1999 and 2001, Silver medal in 2002, Bronze medal in 1998, 4th place in 2004
- German Championships Bronze Medal in 2004, 5th place in 2002
- German Championship Winner in 2008 at Balve Optimum and 2010 at "Turnier der Sieger" in Münster
- First woman to win the World Cup Finals three times (2005, 2008, 2009)
- Ranked #1 in the Rolex World Rankings for 11 consecutive months in 2008 (February–December).
- Bronze medal in Team Jumping event at the 2016 Summer Olympics (Fibonacci) in Rio de Janeiro

== See also ==
- List of Princeton University Olympians
