= Peter McMahon (equestrian) =

Australian equestrian (born 1981)

Personal information
- Nationality: Australian
- Born: 16 October 1981 (age 44) Parkes, New South Wales, Australia

Sport
- Sport: Equestrian

Peter McMahon (born 16 October 1981) is an Australian equestrian. He competed in two events at the 2008 Summer Olympics.
