= Albert Zoer =

Dutch champion in show jumping (born 1975)

Personal information
- Full name: Albert Zoer
- Born: 31 July 1975 (age 51); Echten, Drenthe, Netherlands
- Horse(s): Sam; Okidoki

Albert Zoer (born 31 July 1975, in Echten, Drenthe) is a Dutch champion in show jumping. He owns his own business, called Zoer B.V., for breeding and training stallions, a venture with which his father, Arent Zoer, helps him.

== Background ==
With two older sisters, Jenny and Gina, Zoer grew up on the farm in Echten which his father purchased in the year before his birth. This farm initially had only five stables, but from the time Zoer and his sisters were all riding horses, that number gradually increased to twenty and more. He began show jumping since the age of seven and he declares that his passion, or addiction to riding horses made him dislike having to go to school. At the age of sixteen, Zoer was a member of the victorious Dutch team at the 1989 European Pony Championships. Jenny Zoer participated in the 1992 Olympic Games (the Dutch won the gold medal for team show jumping). Meanwhile, her brother competed in the European Show Jumping Championships for juniors in 1991 and for young riders in 1993. Though certainly a serious contender, he has yet to achieve his Olympic dream.

== Career highlights ==
His team won the gold medal at the 2006 World Equestrian Games as well as the 2007 European Championships in Mannheim. On 20 December 2007, he and Okidoki won at the International Horse Show in Olympia, London. He and his horse Sam won the Grand Prix at the 2008 Samsung Super League's event in Rotterdam. Two weeks later, he and Sam again were victorious in the league's Grand Prix in Aachen., He also won the 10th round of the FEI World Cup Jumping 2008–09 in Bordeaux, despite a double fracture in his leg. The Royal Netherlands Equestrian Union confirmed that, prior to the accident, Zoer had been a leading contender for the Dutch Olympic equestrian team in Hong Kong. The fracture occurred while Zoer was training on the Tuesday after his Aachen win.

=== Global Champions Tour ===
Zoer and his horse Okidoki were the winners of the Global Champions Tour final for 2007.

Zoer and Sam were the runners-up on the first day of the 2009 Global Champions Tour in Doha, Qatar. With a finish time of 40.42 and zero penalties, he was just a third of a second slower than the winner, Jessica Kurten. His prize money amounted to €38,581.

Riding Okidoki, Zoer ranked third in the first round qualifier of the Global Champions Tour final in Doha on 13 November 2009. His award from the purse was €8500. His final time was 75.63. This ranking put Zoer well within the qualification for the final purse (€300,000) on 14 November, as the 25 contenders were narrowed down to 18 in the first round. Eric Lamaze and Bernardo Alves ranked ahead of Zoer.

== List of horses ==
- Promises in Millstreet
- Cordillio
- Don Camillo
- Lowina
- Lincoln - mare owned by Engemann Youngsters GmbH
- Okidoki (b. 1996) - Dutch Warmblood, gelding, bay
- Sam (b. 1999) - Dutch Warmblood, gelding, bay
