= Equestrian at the 2004 Summer Olympics – Individual jumping =

Individual jumping at the Games of the XXVIII Olympiad
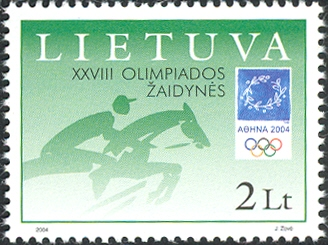
- Lithuania stamp commemorating 2004 Olympic equestrianism
- Venue: Markopoulo Olympic Equestrian Centre
- Dates: 22–27 August 2004
- Competitors: 77 from 27 nations
- Winning total: 8 faults

Medalists
1st place, gold medalist(s)		Rodrigo Pessoa; Brazil
2nd place, silver medalist(s)		Chris Kappler; United States
3rd place, bronze medalist(s)		Marco Kutscher; Germany

The individual show jumping event, part of the equestrian program at the 2004 Summer Olympics, was held from 22 to 27 August 2004 in the Olympic Equestrian Centre on the outskirts of Markopoulo in the Attica region of Greece. Like all other equestrian events, the jumping competition was mixed gender, with both male and female athletes competing in the same division. There were 77 competitors from 27 nations. Each nation could send up to 4 riders. Cian O'Connor of Ireland initially received the gold medal, but that medal was stripped from him due to doping. After his disqualification, the event was won by Rodrigo Pessoa of Brazil, the nation's first medal in individual jumping. Silver went to Chris Kappler of the United States, with bronze to Marco Kutscher of Germany.

== Doping test ==
On 8 October 2004, the International Federation for Equestrian Sports (FEI) announced that the A-samples from four Olympic horses had failed doping control, and the Equestrian Federation of Ireland said one of these was Cian O'Connor's horse, Waterford Crystal. The urine B-sample went missing en route to a testing laboratory, prompting a flurry of media interest. On 9 November, testing of the blood B-sample confirmed traces of fluphenazine and zuclopenthixol. On 27 March 2005, the FEI gave a ruling disqualifying O'Connor and banning him from competition for three months, while accepting his contention that the drugs were administered by a vet as part of a sedative for a leg injury and were not with intent to enhance performance. O'Connor decided not to appeal and began his suspension on 11 April 2005. He was formally stripped of his medal at the end of the appeal window, on 3 July 2005.

Rodrigo Pessoa was presented with his gold medal in August 2005 at a ceremony on Copacabana Beach.

== Background ==
This was the 22nd appearance of the event, which had first been held at the 1900 Summer Olympics and has been held at every Summer Olympics at which equestrian sports have been featured (that is, excluding 1896, 1904, and 1908). It is the oldest event on the current programme, the only one that was held in 1900.

Three of the top 12 riders (including ties for 10th place) from the 2000 Games returned: fourth-place finishers Ludo Philippaerts of Belgium and Otto Becker of Germany and tenth-place finisher Thomas Velin of Denmark. 1992 Olympic gold medalist Ludger Beerbaum of Germany also returned. The reigning World Champion, Dermott Lennon of Ireland, did not compete due to an injury to his horse, Liscalgot. Other notable absences included Marcus Ehning (also due to equine injury) and Meredith Michaels-Beerbaum (positive doping test), both of Germany. Despite those absences, Germany still had a strong team (sweeping the podium at the European championships). Rodrigo Pessoa was among the favorites, as he had been in 2000 before refusals derailed his final round ride in Sydney.

Greece made its debut in the event. France competed for the 20th time, most of any nation.

== Competition format ==
The competition used the five-round format introduced in 1992, with three rounds in the qualifying round and two rounds in the final.

For the qualifying round, each pair competed in three rounds. The total score across all three rounds counted for advancement to the individual final; the second and third rounds counted towards the team score. The individual competition allowed 45 pairs to advance to the final, though only three pairs per nation were allowed. Scores did not carry over to the final.

In the final, there were two rounds. All of the finalists competed in the first, but only the top 20 pairs competed again in the second round. The combined score for the two rounds was the result for those pairs. A jump-off would be used if necessary to break ties for medal positions; other ties would not be broken.

== Schedule ==
All times are Greece Standard Time (UTC+2)

Date	Time	Round
Sunday, 22 August 2004	9:00	Qualifying round 1
Tuesday, 24 August 2004	9:00; 20:30	Qualifying round 2 Qualifying round 3
Friday, 27 August 2004	16:00; 20:30	Final round A Final round B

== Results ==
=== Qualifying round ===
==== Round 1 ====
10 of the 77 pairs had flawless rides in the first qualifying round. The two riders who were eliminated during the round automatically received a score 20 points higher than the highest other score and continued to compete in the second round.

Rank	Rider	Nation	Horse	Penalties		
Rank	Rider	Nation	Horse	Jump	Time	Total
1	Peter Wylde	United States	Fein Cera	0	0	0
1	Juan Carlos García	Italy	Albin III	0	0	0
1	Thomas Velin	Denmark	Carnute	0	0	0
1	Malin Baryard	Sweden	Butterfly Flip	0	0	0
1	Antonis Petris	Greece	Gredo la Daviere	0	0	0
1	Peder Fredericson	Sweden	Magic Bengtsson	0	0	0
1	Grant Cashmore	New Zealand	Franklins Flyte	0	0	0
1	Ludo Philippaerts	Belgium	Parco	0	0	0
1	Beezie Madden	United States	Authentic	0	0	0
1	Wim Schröder	Netherlands	Montreal	0	0	0
11	Otto Becker	Germany	Dobels Cento	0	1	1
11	McLain Ward	United States	Sapphire	0	1	1
11	Bernardo Alves	Brazil	Canturo	0	1	1
11	Nick Skelton	Great Britain	Arko III	0	1	1
~~11~~	Ludger Beerbaum	Germany	Goldfever	~~0~~	~~1~~	~~1~~
~~11~~	Cian O'Connor	Ireland	Waterford Crystal	~~0~~	~~1~~	~~1~~
17	Kevin Babington	Ireland	Carling King	0	2	2
18	Yuka Watanabe	Japan	Nike	0	3	3
19	Christian Ahlmann	Germany	Cöster	4	0	4
19	Chris Kappler	United States	Royal Kaliber	4	0	4
19	Jos Lansink	Belgium	Cumano	4	0	4
19	Leopold van Asten	Netherlands	Fleche Rouge	4	0	4
19	Rolf-Göran Bengtsson	Sweden	Mac Kinley	4	0	4
19	Robert Smith	Great Britain	Mr Springfield	4	0	4
19	Bruno Broucqsault	France	Dileme de Cephe	4	0	4
19	Markus Fuchs	Switzerland	Tinka's Boy	4	0	4
19	Stanny Van Paesschen	Belgium	O de Pomme	4	0	4
19	Florian Angot	France	First de Launay	4	0	4
19	Jessica Kürten	Ireland	Castle Forbes Maike	4	0	4
19	Gert-Jan Bruggink	Netherlands	Joel	4	0	4
31	Eric Navet	France	Dollar du Murier	4	1	5
31	Gerco Schröder	Netherlands	Monaco	4	1	5
31	Peter Eriksson	Sweden	Cardento	4	1	5
31	Fabio Crotta	Switzerland	Mme Pompadour M	4	1	5
31	Bruno Chimirri	Italy	Landknecht	4	1	5
31	Rodrigo Pessoa	Brazil	Baloubet du Rouet	4	1	5
31	Federico Sztyrle	Argentina	Who Knows Lilly	4	1	5
31	Danae Tsatsou	Greece	Roble Z	4	1	5
31	Luciana Diniz	Brazil	Mariachi	4	1	5
31	Rossen Raitchev	Bulgaria	Medoc II	4	1	5
31	Sohn Bong-Gak	South Korea	Cim Christo	4	1	5
42	Hwang Soon-Won	South Korea	C.Chap	4	2	6
42	Marion Hughes	Ireland	Fortunus	4	2	6
42	Eugenie Angot	France	Cigale du Taillis	4	2	6
42	Woo Jung-Ho	South Korea	Seven Up	4	2	6
42	Steve Guerdat	Switzerland	Olympic	4	2	6
47	Gerardo Tazzer	Mexico	Chanel	4	4	8
47	Álvaro Alfonso de Miranda Neto	Brazil	Countdown 23	8	0	8
47	Vincenzo Chimirri	Italy	Delfi Platiere	8	0	8
47	Martín Dopazo	Argentina	Furka du Village	8	0	8
47	Tadayoshi Hayashi	Japan	Swanky	8	0	8
47	Grzegorz Kubiak	Poland	Djane des Fontenis	8	0	8
47	Marco Kutscher	Germany	Montender	8	0	8
54	Federico Fernandez	Mexico	Behomio 8	8	1	9
54	Ramzy Al-Duhami	Saudi Arabia	Fall Khaeer	8	1	9
54	Lucas Werthein	Argentina	Warren	8	1	9
54	Christina Liebherr	Switzerland	No Mercy	8	1	9
58	Andre Sakakini	Egypt	Casper	8	2	10
59	Ian Millar	Canada	Promise Me	8	3	11
60	Kamal Bahamdan	Saudi Arabia	Casita	12	0	12
60	Taizo Sugitani	Japan	Lamalushi	12	0	12
60	Dirk Demeersman	Belgium	Clinton	12	0	12
63	Daniel Meech	New Zealand	Diagonal	12	1	13
63	Ibrahim Bisharat	Jordan	Qwinto	12	1	13
63	Hannah Mytilinaiou	Greece	Santana	12	1	13
66	Joo Jung-Hyun	South Korea	Epsom Gesmeray	12	2	14
66	Ryuichi Obata	Japan	Oliver Q	12	2	14
68	Vladimir Tuganov	Russia	Leroy Brown	12	3	15
69	Marcela Lobo	Mexico	Joskin	12	4	16
69	Guy Thomas	New Zealand	Madison	16	0	16
71	Roberto Arioldi	Italy	Dime de la Cour	16	1	17
72	Gustavo Hernández Leyva	Mexico	Minotauro	16	3	19
73	Mark Watring	Puerto Rico	Sapphire	24	1	25
74	Bruce Goodin	New Zealand	Braveheart	24	4	28
75	Tim Amitrano	Australia	Mr Innocent	36	2	38
76	Emmanouela Athanassiades	Greece	Rimini Z	Eliminated (58)		58
76	Gregorio Werthein	Argentina	Calwaro El	Eliminated (58)		58

==== Round 2 ====
The second qualifying round was also the first team round. Only one pair continued to progress without any penalties, though 27 had 10 or fewer.

Rank	Rider	Nation	Horse	Penalties			
Rank	Rider	Nation	Horse	Jump	Time	Round 1	Total
1	Beezie Madden	United States	Authentic	0	0	0	0
2	Juan Carlos García	Italy	Albin III	0	1	0	1
~~2~~	Ludger Beerbaum	Germany	Goldfever	~~0~~	~~0~~	~~1~~	~~1~~
4	Kevin Babington	Ireland	Carling King	0	1	2	3
5	Wim Schröder	Netherlands	Montreal	4	0	0	4
5	Antonis Petris	Greece	Gredo la Daviere	4	0	0	4
5	Ludo Philippaerts	Belgium	Parco	4	0	0	4
5	Gert-Jan Bruggink	Netherlands	Joel	0	0	4	4
5	Chris Kappler	United States	Royal Kaliber	0	0	4	4
5	Rolf-Göran Bengtsson	Sweden	Mac Kinley	0	0	4	4
5	Thomas Velin	Denmark	Carnute	4	0	0	4
12	Rodrigo Pessoa	Brazil	Baloubet du Rouet	0	0	5	5
13	Nick Skelton	Great Britain	Arko III	4	1	1	6
13	Yuka Watanabe	Japan	Nike	0	3	3	6
13	Otto Becker	Germany	Dobels Cento	4	1	1	6
16	Florian Angot	France	First de Launay	4	0	4	8
16	Christian Ahlmann	Germany	Cöster	4	0	4	8
16	Peder Fredericson	Sweden	Magic Bengtsson	8	0	0	8
16	Leopold van Asten	Netherlands	Fleche Rouge	4	0	4	8
16	Marco Kutscher	Germany	Montender	0	0	8	8
16	Malin Baryard-Johnsson	Sweden	Butterfly Flip	8	0	0	8
16	Markus Fuchs	Switzerland	Tinka's Boy	4	0	4	8
23	Peter Eriksson	Sweden	Cardento	4	0	5	9
23	Bernardo Alves	Brazil	Canturo	8	0	1	9
23	Christina Liebherr	Switzerland	No Mercy	0	0	9	9
23	McLain Ward	United States	Sapphire	8	0	1	9
27	Eugenie Angot	France	Cigale du Taillis	4	0	6	10
28	Peter Wylde	United States	Fein Cera	12	0	0	12
28	Grant Cashmore	New Zealand	Franklins Flyte	12	0	0	12
28	Dirk Demeersman	Belgium	Clinton	0	0	12	12
28	Robert Smith	Great Britain	Mr Springfield	8	0	4	12
28	Stanny van Paesschen	Belgium	O de Pomme	8	0	4	12
33	Fabio Crotta	Switzerland	Mme Pompadour M	8	0	5	13
33	Jessica Kürten	Ireland	Castle Forbes Maike	8	1	4	13
33	Gerco Schröder	Netherlands	Monaco	8	0	5	13
33	Bruno Chimirri	Italy	Landknecht	8	0	5	13
~~33~~	Cian O'Connor	Ireland	Waterford Crystal	~~12~~	~~0~~	~~1~~	~~13~~
38	U Jung-ho	South Korea	Seven Up	8	0	6	14
39	Hwang Sun-won	South Korea	C.Chap	8	1	6	15
40	Martín Dopazo	Argentina	Furka du Village	8	0	8	16
40	Álvaro Alfonso de Miranda Neto	Brazil	Countdown 23	8	0	8	16
42	Rossen Raitchev	Bulgaria	Medoc II	12	0	5	17
42	Jos Lansink	Belgium	Cumano	12	1	4	17
44	Luciana Diniz	Brazil	Mariachi	12	1	5	18
45	Daniel Meech	New Zealand	Diagonal	4	2	13	19
46	Vincenzo Chimirri	Italy	Delfi Platiere	12	0	8	20
46	Grzegorz Kubiak	Poland	Djane des Fontenis	12	0	8	20
48	Federico Fernandez	Mexico	Behomio 8	12	0	9	21
48	Ian Millar	Canada	Promise Me	8	2	11	21
48	Eric Navet	France	Dollar du Murier	16	0	5	21
51	Ibrahim Bisharat	Jordan	Qwinto	8	1	13	22
52	Vladimir Tuganov	Russia	Leroy Brown	8	0	15	23
53	Kamal Bahamdan	Saudi Arabia	Casita	12	0	12	24
54	Tadayoshi Hayashi	Japan	Swanky	16	1	8	25
55	Steve Guerdat	Switzerland	Olympic	20	0	6	26
55	Son Bong-gak	South Korea	Cim Christo	16	5	5	26
55	Ramzy Al-Duhami	Saudi Arabia	Fall Khaeer	16	1	9	26
55	Andre Sakakini	Egypt	Casper	16	0	10	26
59	Roberto Arioldi	Italy	Dime de la Cour	8	2	17	27
59	Ju Jeong-hyeon	South Korea	Epsom Gesmeray	12	1	14	27
61	Taizo Sugitani	Japan	Lamalushi	16	0	12	28
62	Guy Thomas	New Zealand	Madison	12	1	16	29
63	Hannah Roberson-Mytilinaiou	Greece	Santana	24	2	13	39
64	Marcela Lobo	Mexico	Joskin	20	5	16	41
65	Danai Tsatsou	Greece	Roble Z	32	7	5	44
66	Gustavo Hernández Leyva	Mexico	Minotauro	32	1	19	52
67	Bruce Goodin	New Zealand	Braveheart	28	0	28	56
68	Mark Watring	Puerto Rico	Sapphire	36	3	25	64
69	Gregorio Werthein	Argentina	Calwaro El	12	2	58	72
70	Emmanouela Athanasiadi	Greece	Rimini Z	8	9	58	75
71	Tim Amitrano	Australia	Mr Innocent	44	4	38	86
72	Gerardo Tazzer	Mexico	Chanel	Eliminated (68)		8	76
72	Lucas Werthein	Argentina	Warren	Eliminated (68)		9	77
72	Ryuichi Obata	Japan	Oliver Q	Eliminated (68)		9	77
75	Bruno Broucqsault	France	Dileme de Cephe	DNF		4	DNF
75	Federico Enrique Sztyrle	Argentina	Who Knows Lilly	DNF		5	DNF
75	Marion Hughes	Ireland	Fortunus	DNF		6	DNF

==== Round 3 ====
The third individual qualifier was also the second team round. All athletes competed individually regardless of their team's qualification. 45 pairs advanced to the final round. Only three pairs from any single NOC could advance. This meant that all pairs through 51st place were qualified, as that was the lowest place that would allow for no less than 45 pairs to advance after teams that had four qualified pairs selected three of them. Since there was a tie for 51st place, a total of 46 pairs advanced.

Rank	Rider	Nation	Horse	Penalties				Notes
Rank	Rider	Nation	Horse	Jump	Time	Round 1+2	Total	Notes
1	Beezie Madden	United States	Authentic	0	0	0	0	Q
~~2~~	Ludger Beerbaum	Germany	Goldfever	~~0~~	~~0~~	~~1~~	~~1~~	Q, DPG
3	Rolf-Göran Bengtsson	Sweden	Mac Kinley	0	0	4	4	Q
4	Nick Skelton	Great Britain	Arko III	0	0	6	6	Q
5	Marco Kutscher	Germany	Montender	0	0	8	8	Q
5	Gert-Jan Bruggink	Netherlands	Joel	4	0	4	8	Q
5	Chris Kappler	United States	Royal Kaliber	4	0	4	8	Q
5	Kevin Babington	Ireland	Carling King	4	1	3	8	Q
9	Juan Carlos García	Italy	Albin III	8	0	1	9	Q
10	Thomas Velin	Denmark	Carnute	4	2	4	10	Q
10	Otto Becker	Germany	Dobels Cento	4	0	6	10	Q
12	Eugenie Angot	France	Cigale du Taillis	0	1	10	11	Q
13	Antonis Petris	Greece	Gredo la Daviere	8	0	4	12	Q
13	Wim Schröder	Netherlands	Montreal	8	0	4	12	Q
13	Peder Fredericson	Sweden	Magic Bengtsson	4	0	8	12	Q
13	Malin Baryard-Johnsson	Sweden	Butterfly Flip	4	0	8	12	Q
17	Jessica Kürten	Ireland	Castle Forbes Maike	0	0	13	13	Q
18	Rodrigo Pessoa	Brazil	Baloubet du Rouet	8	1	5	14	Q
19	Christian Ahlmann	Germany	Cöster	8	0	8	16	3/NOC
19	Leopold van Asten	Netherlands	Fleche Rouge	8	0	8	16	Q
21	Florian Angot	France	First de Launay	8	1	8	17	Q
21	Christina Liebherr	Switzerland	No Mercy	8	0	9	17	Q
21	McLain Ward	United States	Sapphire	8	0	9	17	Q
21	Fabio Crotta	Switzerland	Mme Pompadour M	4	0	13	17	Q
21	Jos Lansink	Belgium	Cumano	0	0	17	17	Q
21	Gerco Schröder	Netherlands	Monaco	4	0	13	17	3/NOC
27	Bruno Chimirri	Italy	Landknecht	4	1	13	18	Q
28	Peter Eriksson	Sweden	Cardento	8	2	9	19	3/NOC
29	Daniel Meech	New Zealand	Diagonal	0	1	19	20	Q
29	Ludo Philippaerts	Belgium	Parco	16	0	4	20	Q
29	Dirk Demeersman	Belgium	Clinton	8	0	12	20	Q
29	Stanny van Paesschen	Belgium	O de Pomme	8	0	12	20	3/NOC
33	Robert Smith	Great Britain	Mr Springfield	8	1	12	21	Q
33	Hwang Soon-Won	South Korea	C.Chap	4	2	15	21	Q
33	Markus Fuchs	Switzerland	Tinka's Boy	12	1	8	21	Q
~~36~~	Cian O'Connor	Ireland	Waterford Crystal	~~8~~	~~1~~	~~13~~	~~22~~	Q, DPG
37	Martín Dopazo	Argentina	Furka du Village	8	0	16	24	Q
37	Yuka Watanabe	Japan	Nike	16	2	6	24	Q
37	Peter Wylde	United States	Fein Cera	12	0	12	24	3/NOC
40	Rossen Raitchev	Bulgaria	Medoc II	8	0	17	25	Q
41	Steve Guerdat	Switzerland	Olympic	0	2	26	28	3/NOC
41	Álvaro Alfonso de Miranda Neto	Brazil	Countdown 23	12	0	16	28	Q
43	Woo Jung-Ho	South Korea	Seven Up	16	0	14	30	3/NOC
44	Ian Millar	Canada	Promise Me	8	2	21	31	Q
44	Sohn Bong-Gak	South Korea	Cim Christo	4	1	26	31	Q
46	Vladimir Tuganov	Russia	Leroy Brown	8	1	23	32	Q
46	Vincenzo Chimirri	Italy	Delfi Platiere	12	0	20	32	Q
48	Grant Cashmore	New Zealand	Franklins Flyte	20	1	12	33	Q
49	Luciana Diniz	Brazil	Mariachi	16	0	18	34	Q
50	Kamal Bahamdan	Saudi Arabia	Casita	12	0	24	36	Q
51	Taizo Sugitani	Japan	Lamalushi	8	1	28	37	Q
51	Grzegorz Kubiak	Poland	Djane des Fontenis	16	1	20	37	Q
51	Joo Jung-Hyun	South Korea	Epsom Gesmeray	8	2	27	37	Q
54	Federico Fernandez	Mexico	Behomio 8	16	1	21	38	
55	Ibrahim Bisharat	Jordan	Qwinto	20	0	22	42	
56	Roberto Arioldi	Italy	Dime de la Cour	20	1	27	48	
57	Ramzy Al-Duhami	Saudi Arabia	Fall Khaeer	28	0	26	54	
58	Marcela Lobo	Mexico	Joskin	16	1	41	58	
58	Guy Thomas	New Zealand	Madison	28	1	29	58	
60	Hannah Mytilinaiou	Greece	Santana	20	6	39	65	
61	Bernardo Alves	Brazil	Canturo	Eliminated		9	—	
62	Eric Navet	France	Dollar du Murier	DNF		21	DNF	
62	Tadayoshi Hayashi	Japan	Swanky	DNF		25	DNF	
62	Andre Sakakini	Egypt	Casper	DNF		26	DNF	
62	Danae Tsatsou	Greece	Roble Z	DNF		44	DNF	
62	Gustavo Hernández Leyva	Mexico	Minotauro	DNF		52	DNF	
62	Bruce Goodin	New Zealand	Braveheart	DNF		56	DNF	
62	Mark Watring	Puerto Rico	Sapphire	DNF		64	DNF	
62	Gregorio Werthein	Argentina	Calwaro El	DNF		72	DNF	
62	Emmanouela Athanassiades	Greece	Rimini Z	DNF		75	DNF	
62	Tim Amitrano	Australia	Mr Innocent	DNF		86	DNF	
72	Gerardo Tazzer	Mexico	Chanel	DNS		76	DNF	
72	Lucas Werthein	Argentina	Warren	DNS		77	DNF	
72	Ryuichi Obata	Japan	Oliver Q	DNS		77	DNF	
75	Bruno Broucqsault	France	Dileme de Cephe	DNS		DNF	DNF	
75	Federico Enrique Sztyrle	Argentina	Who Knows Lilly	DNS		DNF	DNF	
75	Marion Hughes	Ireland	Fortunus	DNS		DNF	DNF	

=== Final round ===
==== Round A ====
Beezie Madden was assessed her first penalties of the event in the fourth round. Unfortunately for her but fortunately for many of the other pairs, all the scores had reset after the third qualifying round.

Rank	Rider	Nation	Horse	Penalties			Notes
Rank	Rider	Nation	Horse	Jump	Time	Total	Notes
1	Jessica Kürten	Ireland	Castle Forbes Maike	0	0	0	Q
1	Nick Skelton	Great Britain	Arko III	0	0	0	Q
3	Daniel Meech	New Zealand	Diagonal	0	1	1	Q
~~4~~	Cian O'Connor	Ireland	Waterford Crystal	~~4~~	~~0~~	~~4~~	Q, DPG
5	Ludo Philippaerts	Belgium	Parco	4	0	4	Q
5	Wim Schröder	Netherlands	Montreal	4	0	4	Q
5	Thomas Velin	Denmark	Carnute	4	0	4	Q
5	Chris Kappler	United States	Royal Kaliber	4	0	4	Q
5	Marco Kutscher	Germany	Montender	4	0	4	Q
10	Sohn Bong-Gak	South Korea	Cim Christo	4	1	5	Q
11	Bruno Chimirri	Italy	Landknecht	4	2	6	Q
12	Joo Jung-Hyun	South Korea	Epsom Gesmeray	8	0	8	Q
12	Taizo Sugitani	Japan	Lamalushi	8	0	8	Q
12	Vincenzo Chimirri	Italy	Delfi Platiere	8	0	8	Q
12	Ian Millar	Canada	Promise Me	8	0	8	Q
12	Álvaro Alfonso de Miranda Neto	Brazil	Countdown 23	8	0	8	Q
12	Martín Dopazo	Argentina	Furka du Village	8	0	8	Q
12	Hwang Soon-Won	South Korea	C.Chap	8	0	8	Q
12	Robert Smith	Great Britain	Mr Springfield	8	0	8	Q
12	Dirk Demeersman	Belgium	Clinton	8	0	8	Q
12	McLain Ward	United States	Sapphire	8	0	8	Q
12	Christina Liebherr	Switzerland	No Mercy	8	0	8	Q
12	Rodrigo Pessoa	Brazil	Baloubet du Rouet	8	0	8	Q
12	Peder Fredericson	Sweden	Magic Bengtsson	8	0	8	Q
12	Otto Becker	Germany	Dobels Cento	8	0	8	Q
12	Juan Carlos García	Italy	Albin III	8	0	8	Q
12	Kevin Babington	Ireland	Carling King	8	0	8	Q
12	Rolf-Göran Bengtsson	Sweden	Mac Kinley	8	0	8	Q
~~12~~	Ludger Beerbaum	Germany	Goldfever	~~8~~	~~0~~	~~8~~	Q, DPG
30	Jos Lansink	Belgium	Cumano	12	0	12	
30	Leopold van Asten	Netherlands	Fleche Rouge	12	0	12	
30	Malin Baryard-Johnsson	Sweden	Butterfly Flip	12	0	12	
30	Gert-Jan Bruggink	Netherlands	Joel	12	0	12	
30	Beezie Madden	United States	Authentic	12	0	12	
35	Vladimir Tuganov	Russia	Leroy Brown	12	1	13	
36	Fabio Crotta	Switzerland	Mme Pompadour M	16	0	16	
36	Antonis Petris	Greece	Gredo la Daviere	16	0	16	
36	Eugenie Angot	France	Cigale du Taillis	16	0	16	
39	Yuka Watanabe	Japan	Nike	12	5	17	
40	Luciana Diniz	Brazil	Mariachi	20	0	20	
40	Grant Cashmore	New Zealand	Franklins Flyte	20	0	20	
40	Florian Angot	France	First de Launay	20	0	20	
43	Rossen Raitchev	Bulgaria	Medoc II	20	1	21	
44	Grzegorz Kubiak	Poland	Djane des Fontenis	24	0	24	
45	Kamal Bahamdan	Saudi Arabia	Casita	24	1	25	
46	Markus Fuchs	Switzerland	Tinka's Boy	DNF			

==== Round B ====
The 18-way tie for twelfth-place resulted in 29 pairs advancing to the second round of the final. O'Connor had a clean round, finishing the two-round final with 4 faults and the gold medal—which was later stripped. A jump-off was required to break the tie for the silver medal. Royal Kaliber, an American horse ridden by Chris Kappler, was injured during the jump-off and the pair halted. Despite the injury, they received bronze medals (later upgraded to silver with the disqualification of O'Connor). Rodrigo Pessoa and his horse Baloubet du Rouet earned 4 penalties in the jump-off, completing the course in 49.42 seconds; their silver medals were later upgraded to gold.

Rank	Rider	Nation	Horse	Penalties				Notes
Rank	Rider	Nation	Horse	Jump	Time	Round A	Total	Notes
~~1~~	Cian O'Connor	Ireland	Waterford Crystal	~~0~~	~~0~~	~~4~~	~~4~~	DPG
1	Rodrigo Pessoa	Brazil	Baloubet du Rouet	0	0	8	8	Q
1	Chris Kappler	United States	Royal Kaliber	4	0	4	8	Q
3rd place, bronze medalist(s)	Marco Kutscher	Germany	Montender	4	1	4	9	
4	Robert Smith	Great Britain	Mr Springfield	4	0	8	12	
4	Dirk Demeersman	Belgium	Clinton	4	0	8	12	
4	Peder Fredericson	Sweden	Magic Bengtsson	4	0	8	12	
4	Kevin Babington	Ireland	Carling King	4	0	8	12	
4	Rolf-Göran Bengtsson	Sweden	Mac Kinley	4	0	8	12	
4	Ludo Philippaerts	Belgium	Parco	8	0	4	12	
10	Thomas Velin	Denmark	Carnute	8	1	4	13	
10	Nick Skelton	Great Britain	Arko III	12	1	0	13	
12	Daniel Meech	New Zealand	Diagonal	12	1	1	14	
13	Christina Liebherr	Switzerland	No Mercy	8	1	8	17	
14	Sohn Bong-Gak	South Korea	Cim Christo	12	1	5	18	
15	Taizo Sugitani	Japan	Lamalushi	12	0	8	20	
15	Juan Carlos García	Italy	Albin III	8	4	8	20	
~~15~~	Ludger Beerbaum	Germany	Goldfever	~~12~~	~~0~~	~~8~~	~~20~~	DPG
17	Otto Becker	Germany	Dobels Cento	12	1	8	21	
17	Jessica Kürten	Ireland	Castle Forbes Maike	20	1	0	21	
19	Bruno Chimirri	Italy	Landknecht	16	1	6	23	
20	Hwang Soon-Won	South Korea	C.Chap	16	0	8	24	
21	Martín Dopazo	Argentina	Furka du Village	16	1	8	25	
22	Ian Millar	Canada	Promise Me	20	2	8	30	
23	Joo Jung-Hyun	South Korea	Epsom Gesmeray	Eliminated				
23	Vincenzo Chimirri	Italy	Delfi Platiere	Eliminated				
23	Álvaro Alfonso de Miranda Neto	Brazil	Countdown 23	Eliminated				
23	Wim Schröder	Netherlands	Montreal	Eliminated				
27	McLain Ward	United States	Sapphire	Retired				

==== Jump-off ====
Rank	Rider	Nation	Horse	Penalties	Time (s)
1st place, gold medalist(s)	Rodrigo Pessoa	Brazil	Baloubet du Rouet	4	49.42
2nd place, silver medalist(s)	Chris Kappler	United States	Royal Kaliber	DNF	
