= Equestrian at the 2004 Summer Olympics – Team jumping =

Team jumping at the Games of the XXVIII Olympiad
- Venue: Markopoulo Olympic Equestrian Centre
- Date: 24 August 2004
- Competitors: 64 teams from 16 nations

Medalists
1st place, gold medalist(s)		Peter Wylde, McLain Ward, Chris Kappler, Beezie Madden	United States
2nd place, silver medalist(s)		Peter Eriksson, Peder Fredericson, Malin Baryard-Johnsson, Rolf-Göran Bengtsson	Sweden
3rd place, bronze medalist(s)		Christian Ahlmann, Marco Kutscher, Otto Becker, Ludger Beerbaum (disqualified)	Germany

The individual jumping event, part of the equestrian program at the 2004 Summer Olympics, was held from 22 August to 24 August 2004 in the Olympic Equestrian Centre on the outskirts of Markopoulo in the Attica region of Greece. Like all other equestrian events, the jumping competition was mixed gender, with both male and female athletes competing in the same division.

== Results ==
Rank	Nation	Rider	Horse	Round 1	Round 2	Total
1	United States			8	12	20
		Beezie Madden	Authentic	0	0
		Chris Kappler	Royal Kaliber	0	4
		McLain Ward	Sapphire	8	8
		Peter Wylde	Fein Cera	12	12
2	Sweden			12	8	20
		Rolf-Göran Bengtsson	Mac Kinley	0	0
		Peder Fredericson	Magic Bengtsson	8	4
		Malin Baryard	Butterfly Flip	8	4
		Peter Eriksson	Cardento	4	10
3	Germany			9	12	21
		Marco Kutscher	Montender	0	0
		Otto Becker	Dobels Cento	5	4
		Christian Ahlmann	Cöster	4	8
		Ludger Beerbaum	Goldfever	(0, DSQ)	(0, DSQ)
4	Netherlands			8	16	24
		Gert-Jan Bruggink	Joel	0	4
		Leopold van Asten	Fleche Rouge	4	8
		Gerco Schroder	Monaco	8	4
		Wim Schroder	Montreal	4	8
5	Switzerland			12	14	26
		Christina Liebherr	No Mercy	0	8
		Fabio Crotta	Mme Pompadour M	8	4
		Markus Fuchs	Tinka's Boy	4	13
		Steve Guerdat	Olympic	20	2
6	Belgium			12	16	28
		Dirk Demeersman	Clinton	0	8
		Jos Lansink	Cumano	13	0
		Stanny van Paesschen	O de Pomme	8	8
		Ludo Philippaerts	Parco	4	16
7	Italy			19	25	44
		Juan Carlos García	Albin III	1	8
		Bruno Chimirri	Landknecht	8	5
		Vincenzo Chimirri	Delfi Platiere	12	12
		Roberto Arioldi	Dime de la Cour	10	21
8	Korea			30	21	51
		Hwang Soon-Won	C.Chap	9	6
		Joo Jung-Hyun	Epsom Gesmeray	13	10
		Woo Jung-Ho	Seven Up	8	16
		Sohn Bong-Gak	Cim Christo	21	5
9	Brazil			16	37	53
		Rodrigo Pessoa	Baloubet du Rouet	0	9
		Álvaro de Miranda Neto	Countdown 23	8	12
		Luciana Diniz	Mariachi	13	16
		Bernardo Alves	Canturo	8	Elim.
10	France			24
		Florian Angot	First de Launay	4
		Eugenie Angot	Cigale du Taillis	4
		Eric Navet	Dollar du Murier	16
		Bruno Broucqsault	Dileme de Cephe	Ret.
11	New Zealand			31
		Daniel Meech	Diagonal	6
		Grant Cashmore	Franklins Flyte	12
		Guy Thomas	Madison	13
		Bruce Goodin	Braveheart	28
12	Japan			36
		Yuka Watanabe	Nike	3
		Taizo Sugitani	Lamalushi	16
		Tadayoshi Hayashi	Swanky	17
		Ryuichi Obata	Oliver Q	Elim.
13	Greece			47
		Antonis Petris	Gredo la Daviere	4
		Emmanouela Athanassiades	Rimini Z	17
		Hannah Mytilinaiou	Santana	26
		Danae Tsatsou	Roble Z	39
14	Mexico			70
		Federico Fernandez	Bohemio	12
		Marcela Lobo	Joskin	25
		Gustavo Hernandez Leyva	Minotauro	33
		Gerardo Tazzer	Chanel	Elim.
15	Argentina			Elim.
		Martin Dopazo	Furka du Village	8
		Gregorio Werthein	Calwaro	14
		Federico Sztyrle	Who Knows Lilly	Ret.
		Lucas Werthein	Warren	Elim.
	Ireland			22	14	36 (DQ)
		Kevin Babington	Carling King	1	5
		Jessica Kuerten	Castle Forbes Maike	9	0
		Cian O'Connor	Waterford Crystal (DQ)	DQ (12)	DQ (9)
		Marion Hughes	Fortunus	Ret.	10
