= Chimirri =

Chimirri is an Italian surname. Notable people with the surname include:

- Bruno Chimirri (born 1971), Italian equestrian
- Marcelo Chimirri (fl. 2006–2009), Honduran businessman
- Vincenzo Chimirri (born 1973), Italian equestrian
