= Equestrian at the 2006 Asian Games – Individual jumping =

2006 games in Doha, Qatar

Individual jumping at the 2006 Asian Games
- Venue: Doha Racing & Equestrian Club
- Date: 10–12 December 2006
- Competitors: 64 from 19 nations

Medalists
gold medal	Ali Al-Rumaihi	Qatar
silver medal	Jasmine Chen	Chinese Taipei
bronze medal	Joo Jung-hyun	South Korea

Individual jumping equestrian at the 2006 Asian Games was held in Doha Equestrian Jumping Arena, Doha, Qatar from December 10 to December 12, 2006.

== Schedule ==
All times are Arabia Standard Time (UTC+03:00)

Date	Time	Event
Sunday, 10 December 2006	09:00	1st qualifier
Monday, 11 December 2006	09:00	2nd qualifier
Tuesday, 12 December 2006	09:00	Final round A
Tuesday, 12 December 2006	14:30	Final round B

== Results ==
Legend

- EL — Eliminated
- WD — Withdrawn

=== Qualifier ===
Rank	Athlete	Horse	1st qualifier			2nd qualifier			Total
Rank	Athlete	Horse	Jump	Time	Total	Jump	Time	Total	Total
1	Song Sang-wuk (KOR)	Clinton H	0	0	0	0	0	0	0
1	Khaled Al-Eid (KSA)	Al-Riyadh	0	0	0	0	0	0	0
1	Abdullah Al-Saud (KSA)	Saudia	0	0	0	0	0	0	0
1	Ali Al-Rumaihi (QAT)	Nagano	0	0	0	0	0	0	0
5	Latifa Al-Maktoum (UAE)	Kalaska de Semilly	0	0	0	4	0	4	4
5	Bader Mohammed Fakhroo (QAT)	Philip S	4	0	4	0	0	0	4
5	Toshiki Masui (JPN)	J.R.	4	0	4	0	0	0	4
5	Yaser Charif (SYR)	Empire	4	0	4	0	0	0	4
5	Daisuke Fukushima (JPN)	Royal Selections	4	0	4	0	0	0	4
5	Mohamed Al-Kumaiti (UAE)	Al-Mutawakel	4	0	4	0	0	0	4
5	Abdullah Al-Sharbatly (KSA)	Hugo Gesmeray	4	0	4	0	0	0	4
12	Jasmine Chen (TPE)	Comodoro	4	0	4	4	0	4	8
12	Jones Lanza (PHI)	Don't Cry for Me	4	0	4	4	0	4	8
12	Joy Chen (TPE)	Qualdandro	8	0	8	0	0	0	8
12	Danielle Cojuangco (PHI)	Kidit Saint Clair	8	0	8	0	0	0	8
12	Abdullah Al-Muhairi (UAE)	Quatro H	8	0	8	0	0	0	8
12	Kamal Bahamdan (KSA)	Campus 8	8	0	8	0	0	0	8
12	Joo Jung-hyun (KOR)	Seven Up 15	8	0	8	0	0	0	8
19	Park Jae-hong (KOR)	Pinocchio	4	0	4	4	1	5	9
20	Khaled Al-Khebizi (KUW)	Corlino 3	4	0	4	8	0	8	12
20	Tarek Al-Arnaoot (SYR)	Badr	12	0	12	0	0	0	12
20	Hwang Soon-won (KOR)	Jakomo 2	4	0	4	8	0	8	12
20	Noaf Al-Essa (KUW)	Omnia	4	0	4	8	0	8	12
20	Syed Omar Al-Mohdzar (MAS)	Lui 24	4	0	4	8	0	8	12
20	Toni Leviste (PHI)	Globe Plantinum Just J.	8	0	8	4	0	4	12
26	Hani Bisharat (JOR)	Lavall 10	8	0	8	8	0	8	16
26	Ibrahim Bisharat (JOR)	Contender	8	0	8	8	0	8	16
26	Ali Al-Thani (QAT)	Milena	12	0	12	4	0	4	16
26	Abdullah Al-Marri (UAE)	Secret d'Amour	12	0	12	4	0	4	16
26	Kenneth Cheng (HKG)	Cornalin CH	12	0	12	4	0	4	16
26	Majid Sharifi (IRI)	Apachee	12	0	12	4	0	4	16
26	Qabil Ambak (MAS)	Parvina	12	0	12	4	0	4	16
26	Wang Yi-hsiu (TPE)	Pik Papageno	12	0	12	4	0	4	16
34	Gaelle Tong (HKG)	Capital Star	8	0	8	12	0	12	20
34	Chadi Gharib (SYR)	Watan	12	0	12	8	0	8	20
34	Quzier Ambak (MAS)	Calano	12	0	12	8	0	8	20
34	Haleh Nikouei (IRI)	Oklahoma 1	8	0	8	12	0	12	20
34	Ryuma Hirota (JPN)	Zero	16	0	16	4	0	4	20
39	Hiroyuki Chikamori (JPN)	Smart Seal	24	0	24	0	0	0	24
39	Alex Maurer (MAS)	Tandonia	4	0	4	16	4	20	24
39	Fadi Al-Zabibi (SYR)	Ajuudan	16	0	16	8	0	8	24
42	Alireza Khoshdel (IRI)	Calumeez	20	0	20	12	0	12	32
43	Jennifer Chang (HKG)	Luc Skywalker	20	0	20	20	0	20	40
44	Arash Gholami Yekta (IRI)	Enigma 3	28	0	28	16	0	16	44
45	Paola Zobel (PHI)	Hamonie de Roc	28	3	31	20	0	20	51
46	Sami Ghazwan (BRN)	Hadiya	28	0	28	24	0	24	52
47	Alexandr Tishkov (KAZ)	Lugano	40	1	41	28	0	28	69
—	Ahmed Maki (BRN)	Chamaecy Paris II	20	0	20			EL	EL
—	Abdulwahab Al-Fares (KUW)	Greta Garbo 32	44	0	44			EL	EL
—	Emile Karim Fares (LIB)	Cash Only			WD				WD
—	Marzouq Al-Saidi (KUW)	Paparoni			EL				EL
—	Mubarak Al-Rumaihi (QAT)	Lucas 149			EL				EL
—	Chen Yi-tsung (TPE)	Parodie 290			EL				EL
—	Magali Tong (HKG)	Open Treasure			EL				EL
—	Khaled Al-Khatri (BRN)	Donh Hoi de l'Orme			EL				EL
—	Abbas Isa Mohamed (BRN)	Eurocommerce Balisano			EL				EL
—	Li Zhenqiang (CHN)	Ideal d'Ami VD Watering			EL				EL
—	Zhang Bin (CHN)	Ula Uba			EL				EL
—	Mohammad Kassar (JOR)	Othello			EL				EL
—	Igor Morotski (KAZ)	Neff			EL				EL
—	Oleg Popelyayev (KAZ)	Chamberlain 33			EL				EL
—	Andrei Shalohin (KGZ)	Cameloti			EL				EL
—	Olga Sorokina (KGZ)	Unanine de Longpre			EL				EL
—	Dorjiin Tsogtjargal (MGL)	Calata			EL				EL

=== Final ===
Rank	Athlete	Horse	Round A			Round B			Total	Jump-off	
Rank	Athlete	Horse	Jump	Time	Total	Jump	Time	Total	Total	Pen.	Time
1st place, gold medalist(s)	Ali Al-Rumaihi (QAT)	Nagano	0	0	0	0	0	0	0		
2nd place, silver medalist(s)	Jasmine Chen (TPE)	Comodoro	4	0	4	4	0	4	8	8	38.72
3rd place, bronze medalist(s)	Joo Jung-hyun (KOR)	Seven Up 15	0	0	0	8	0	8	8	9	47.93
4	Toshiki Masui (JPN)	J.R.	0	0	0	8	1	9	9		
4	Syed Omar Al-Mohdzar (MAS)	Lui 24	0	0	0	8	1	9	9		
4	Joy Chen (TPE)	Qualdandro	4	1	5	4	0	4	9		
7	Danielle Cojuangco (PHI)	Kidit Saint Clair	4	1	5	4	1	5	10		
8	Abdullah Al-Saud (KSA)	Saudia	4	0	4	8	0	8	12		
9	Qabil Ambak (MAS)	Parvina	0	0	0	12	2	14	14		
10	Khaled Al-Eid (KSA)	Al-Riyadh	8	0	8	8	0	8	16		
11	Song Sang-wuk (KOR)	Clinton H	0	0	0	16	1	17	17		
12	Mohamed Al-Kumaiti (UAE)	Al-Mutawakel	0	0	0	16	4	20	20		
13	Daisuke Fukushima (JPN)	Royal Selections	0	0	0	20	2	22	22		
13	Yaser Charif (SYR)	Empire	12	1	13	8	1	9	22		
15	Noaf Al-Essa (KUW)	Omnia	12	0	12	8	3	11	23		
16	Ibrahim Bisharat (JOR)	Contender	0	0	0	24	1	25	25		
17	Majid Sharifi (IRI)	Apachee	8	0	8	16	3	19	27		
18	Tarek Al-Arnaoot (SYR)	Badr	8	0	8	16	5	21	29		
19	Kenneth Cheng (HKG)	Cornalin CH	8	0	8	24	0	24	32		
—	Jones Lanza (PHI)	Don't Cry for Me	0	0	0			EL	EL		
—	Hani Bisharat (JOR)	Lavall 10	8	0	8			EL	EL		
—	Bader Mohammed Fakhroo (QAT)	Philip S	8	2	10			EL	EL		
—	Khaled Al-Khebizi (KUW)	Corlino 3	16	0	16			EL	EL		
—	Latifa Al-Maktoum (UAE)	Kalaska de Semilly	16	6	22			EL	EL		
