= Werthein =

Werthein is a surname. Notable people with this surname include:

- Gerardo Werthein (born 1955), Argentine businessman and diplomat
- Gregorio Werthein (born 1983), Argentine equestrian
- Judi Werthein (born 1967), Argentine artist
- Lucas Werthein (born 1981), Argentine equestrian

== See also ==
- Werthein Group, Argentine holding company
- Wertheins Corner, New Jersey, United States, an unincorporated community
