= Equestrian at the 2006 Asian Games – Team jumping =

Team jumping at the 2006 Asian Games
- Venue: Doha Racing & Equestrian Club
- Date: 10–11 December 2006
- Competitors: 58 from 15 nations

Medalists
gold medal	Saudi Arabia; Khaled Al-Eid, Abdullah Al-Saud, Kamal Bahamdan, Abdullah Al-Sharbatly
silver medal	South Korea; Song Sang-wuk, Hwang Soon-won, Park Jae-hong, Joo Jung-hyun
bronze medal	United Arab Emirates; Latifa Al-Maktoum, Abdullah Al-Marri, Abdullah Al-Muhairi, Mohamed Al-Kumaiti

Team jumping equestrian at the 2006 Asian Games was held in Doha Equestrian Jumping Arena, Doha, Qatar from December 10 to December 11, 2006.

== Schedule ==
All times are Arabia Standard Time (UTC+03:00)

Date	Time	Event
Sunday, 10 December 2006	09:00	Round 1
Monday, 11 December 2006	09:00	Round 2

== Results ==
Legend

- EL — Eliminated

Rank	Team	Round		Total	Jump-off	
Rank	Team	1st	2nd	Total	Pen.	Time
1st place, gold medalist(s)	Saudi Arabia (KSA)	4	0	4		
	Khaled Al-Eid on Al-Riyadh	0	0			
	Abdullah Al-Saud on Saudia	0	0			
	Kamal Bahamdan on Campus 8	~~8~~	0			
	Abdullah Al-Sharbatly on Hugo Gesmeray	4	~~0~~			
2nd place, silver medalist(s)	South Korea (KOR)	8	5	13		
	Song Sang-wuk on Clinton H	0	0			
	Hwang Soon-won on Jakomo 2	4	~~8~~			
	Park Jae-hong on Pinocchio	4	5			
	Joo Jung-hyun on Seven Up 15	~~8~~	0			
3rd place, bronze medalist(s)	United Arab Emirates (UAE)	12	4	16		
	Latifa Al-Maktoum on Kalaska de Semilly	0	4			
	Abdullah Al-Marri on Secret d'Amour	~~12~~	~~4~~			
	Abdullah Al-Muhairi on Quatro H	8	0			
	Mohamed Al-Kumaiti on Al-Mutawakel	4	0			
4	Qatar (QAT)	16	4	20		
	Ali Al-Thani on Milena	12	4			
	Bader Mohammed Fakhroo on Philip S	4	0			
	Mubarak Al-Rumaihi on Lucas 149	~~EL~~	~~4~~			
	Ali Al-Rumaihi on Nagano	0	0			
5	Japan (JPN)	24	0	24		
	Hiroyuki Chikamori on Smart Seal	~~24~~	0			
	Ryuma Hirota on Zero	16	~~4~~			
	Toshiki Masui on J.R.	4	0			
	Daisuke Fukushima on Royal Selections	4	0			
6	Philippines (PHI)	20	8	28		
	Jones Lanza on Don't Cry for Me	4	4			
	Paola Zobel on Hamonie de Roc	~~31~~	~~20~~			
	Danielle Cojuangco on Kidit Saint Clair	8	0			
	Toni Leviste on Globe Plantinum Just J.	8	4			
7	Chinese Taipei (TPE)	24	8	32		
	Jasmine Chen on Comodoro	4	4			
	Chen Yi-tsung on Parodie 290	~~EL~~	~~17~~			
	Joy Chen on Qualdandro	8	0			
	Wang Yi-hsiu on Pik Papageno	12	4			
8	Syria (SYR)	28	8	36		
	Chadi Gharib on Watan	12	8			
	Tarek Al-Arnaoot on Badr	12	0			
	Fadi Al-Zabibi on Ajuudan	~~16~~	~~8~~			
	Yaser Charif on Empire	4	0			
9	Malaysia (MAS)	20	20	40		
	Quzier Ambak on Calano	12	8			
	Alex Maurer on Tandonia	4	~~20~~			
	Qabil Ambak on Parvina	~~12~~	4			
	Syed Omar Al-Mohdzar on Lui 24	4	8			
10	Iran (IRI)	40	28	68		
	Arash Gholami Yekta on Enigma 3	~~28~~	~~16~~			
	Haleh Nikouei on Oklahoma 1	8	12			
	Majid Sharifi on Apachee	12	4			
	Alireza Khoshdel on Calumeez	20	12			
11	Kuwait (KUW)	52	20	72		
	Khaled Al-Khebizi on Corlino 3	4	8			
	Marzouq Al-Saidi on Paparoni	~~EL~~	4			
	Abdulwahab Al-Fares on Greta Garbo 32	44	~~EL~~			
	Noaf Al-Essa on Omnia	4	8			
12	Hong Kong (HKG)	40	36	76		
	Gaelle Tong on Capital Star	8	12			
	Jennifer Chang on Luc Skywalker	20	20			
	Kenneth Cheng on Cornalin CH	12	4			
	Magali Tong on Open Treasure	~~EL~~	~~EL~~			
—	Bahrain (BRN)	EL		EL		
	Sami Ghazwan on Hadiya	28				
	Ahmed Maki on Chamaecy Paris II	20				
	Khaled Al-Khatri on Donh Hoi de l'Orme	~~EL~~				
	Abbas Isa Mohamed on Eurocommerce Balisano	EL				
—	Jordan (JOR)	EL		EL		
	Hani Bisharat on Lavall 10	8				
	Mohammad Kassar on Othello	EL				
	Ibrahim Bisharat on Contender	8				
—	Kazakhstan (KAZ)	EL		EL		
	Igor Morotski on Neff	EL				
	Alexandr Tishkov on Lugano	41				
	Oleg Popelyayev on Chamberlain 33	EL				
