= Eugénie Angot =

French equestrian

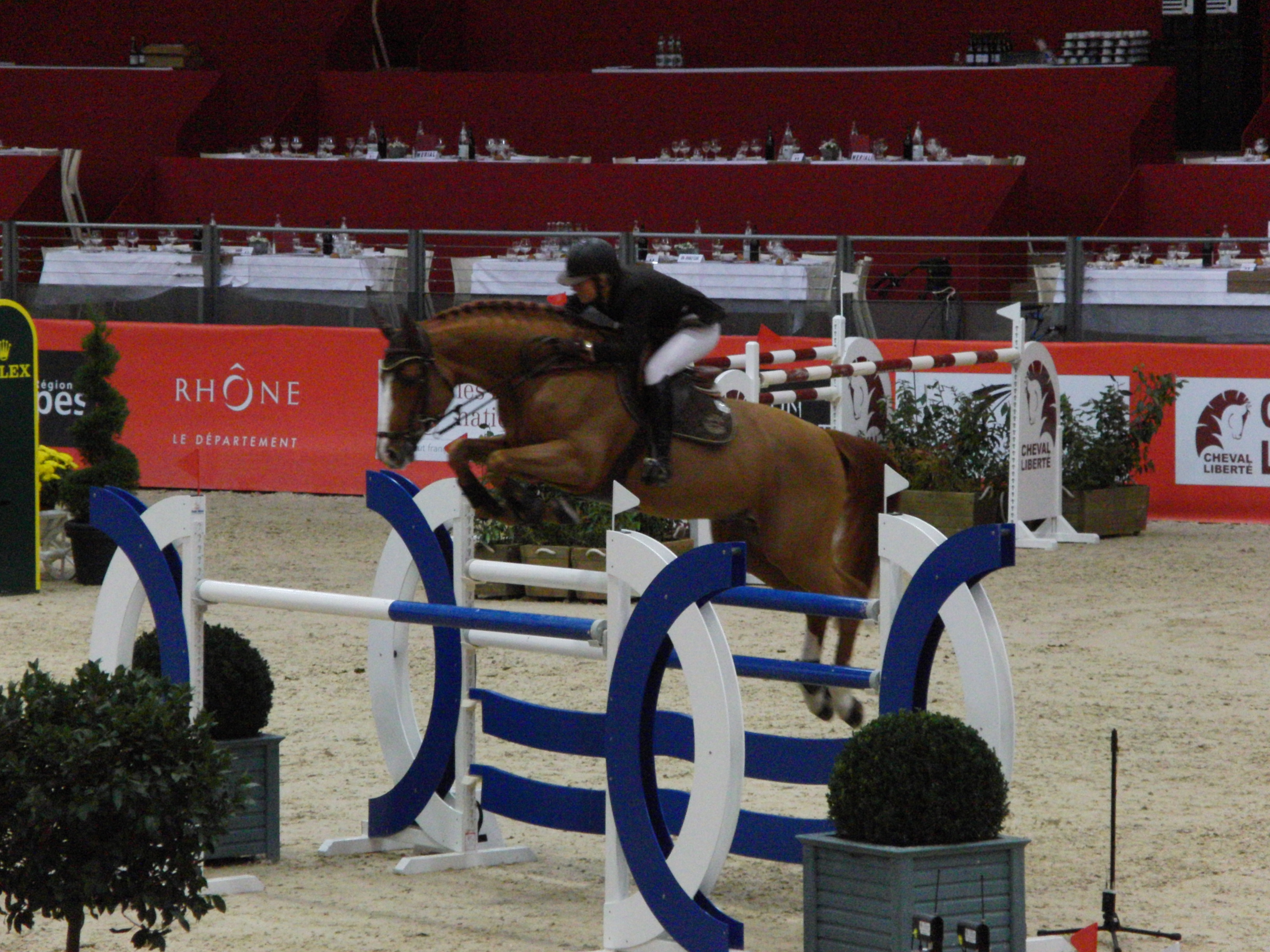

Personal information
- Nationality: French
- Born: Eugénie Legrand; 27 June 1970 (age 56)

Sport
- Sport: Equestrian

Eugénie Angot (French: [øʒeni ɑ̃ɡo]; née Legrand; born 27 June 1970) is a French equestrian. She competed in individual jumping and team jumping at the 2004 Summer Olympics in Athens.

Her father was composer Michel Legrand (1932–2019). She was previously married to fellow equestrian Patrice Delaveau. They had a daughter, Camille Delaveau (born c. 1994). They were later divorced. She married Cédric Angot, another fellow equestrian, in 1999. They had one son, Stanislas Angot.
