= Tim Amitrano =

Australian equestrian

Personal information
- Nationality: Australian
- Born: 27 May 1979 (age 47) Swan Hill, Victoria, Australia

Sport
- Sport: Equestrian
- Event: Show jumping

Tim Amitrano (born 27 May 1979) is an Australian equestrian. He competed in the individual jumping event at the 2004 Summer Olympics.
