= Grzegorz Kubiak =

Polish equestrian

Personal information
- Nationality: Polish
- Born: 9 February 1963 (age 62); Bogusławice, Poland

Sport
- Sport: Equestrian

Grzegorz Kubiak (born 9 February 1963) is a Polish equestrian. He competed in the individual jumping event at the 2004 Summer Olympics.
