= Kevin Babington =

Irish equestrian

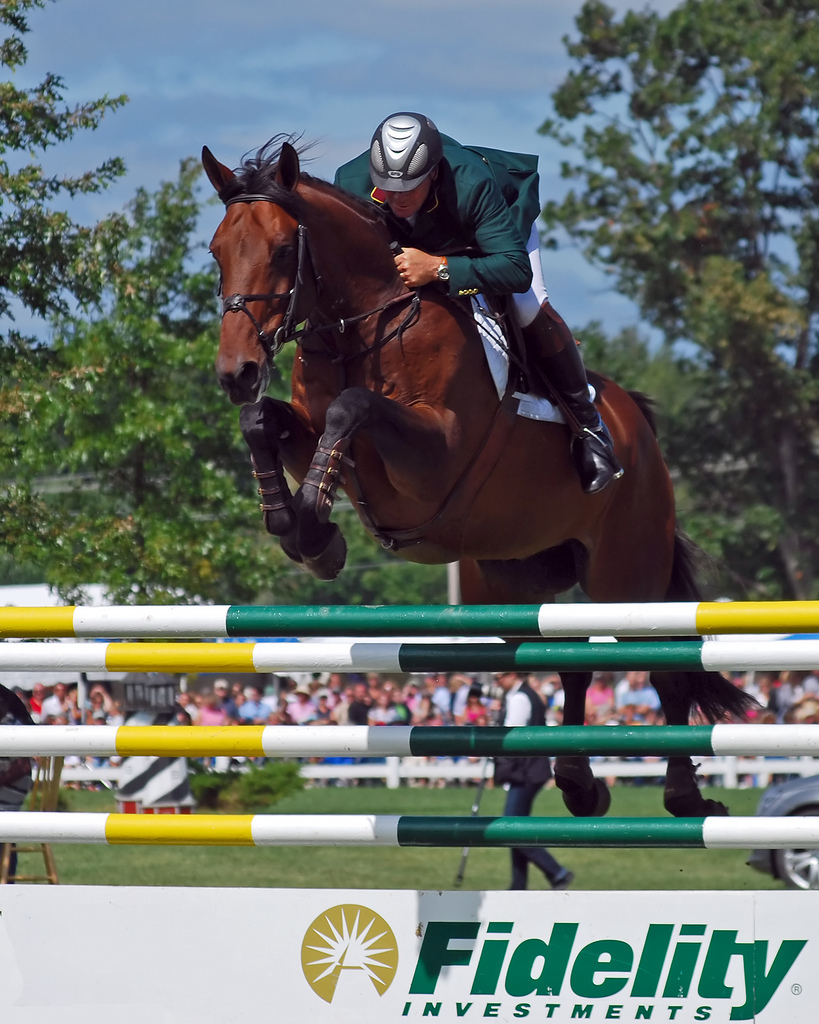

Personal information
- Nationality: Irish
- Born: 24 August 1968 (age 56); Clonmel, County Tipperary, Ireland

Sport
- Sport: Equestrian

Kevin Babington (born 24 August 1968) is an Irish equestrian. He competed in two events at the 2004 Summer Olympics. In 2019, Babington was paralyzed from the neck down following a fall at the Hampton Classic Horse Show.

== Biography ==
Babington was born in 1968 in Clonmel, County Tipperary, the youngest of eleven children. He attended a riding school in Kill, County Kildare when he was 17, undertaking his riding instructor exams with the British Horse Society. The following year, he moved to the United States to become a professional show jumper.

After working as an instructor at a summer camp, he moved to New Jersey, setting up his own business. In 2001, he was part of the Irish team that won gold at the European Championships, before finishing in eighth place at the FEI World Equestrian Games a year later. At the 2000 FEI Nations Cup, he was part of Ireland's team that won gold, the first for Ireland at the Nations Cup in more than sixty years.

At the 2004 Summer Olympics in Athens, Babington competed in the individual jumping and team jumping events, with a best finish of joint-fourth in the individual event. Originally, Babington had finished in fifth place, but the horse ridden by the original gold medal winner, Cian O'Connor, was disqualified for doping.

In August 2019, Babington was riding at the Hampton Classic Horse Show in Bridgehampton, New York, where he fell from his horse. As a result from the fall, he was paralyzed from the neck down. Despite his injury, Babington continued to work as a horse trainer. In February 2021, Babington was awarded with a lifetime achievement award by the American magazine Robb Report's Horsepower Gala.
