= Carling King =

Irish show-jumping horse

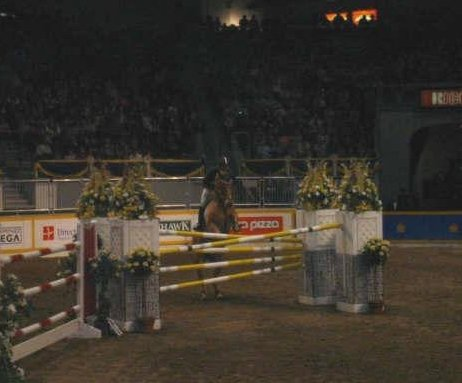
- Kevin Babington and Carling King show jumping indoors
- Breed: Irish Sport Horse
- Sire: Clover Hill (RID)
- Grandsire: Golden Beaker (Thoroughbred)
- Dam: Gortnageer Star (ID Sport Horse)
- Maternal grandsire: Chair Lift (Thoroughbred)
- Sex: Gelding
- Foaled: 1991; Glenamaddy, County Calway, Ireland
- Died: 16 February 2014 (aged 22–23); Pennsylvania, United States
- Country: Ireland
- Colour: Chestnut
- Owner: Kindle Hill Farm, Pennsylvania

Carling King
Medal record

Equestrian

European Championships
Gold medal – first place	2001 Arnhem	Jumping Team

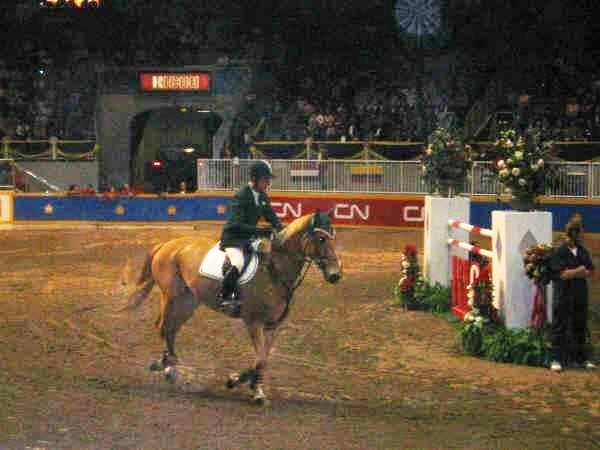
Kevin Babington and Carling King

Carling King (1991 – 16 February 2014) was a horse that was ridden by the Irish international showjumper Kevin Babington.

Carling King was originally bought as a 7-year-old as a mount for his owner, amateur Saly Glassman. After arriving in the United States, his talent (and a somewhat difficult nature) was discovered and Irishman Kevin Babington took over the reins shortly thereafter. Since then, Carling King was eighth in the World Equestrian Games in Jerez, Spain 2002, won multiple international Nation's Cups in 2003, and was the 2001 Samsung Nation's Cup leading horse. Kevin and Carling King placed 4th individually at the 2004 Summer Olympics in Athens. After winning several major Grand Prix competitions in 2004, King was sidelined with an injury to one of his ligaments but has since returned to competition successfully.

Before his arrival in the US, "King", as he was nicknamed, was crowned the 5 year-old champion at the prestigious RDS Dublin Horse Show with rider Michael Buckley. The class was renamed in his honor as the "Carling King Five Year Old National Championship".

King was famous for his incredible consistency in competition and his stylish technique. Although most of his grooms managed to find a softer side, he was known for being somewhat tough and would, on occasion, bite the arm of those not paying enough attention.

Carling King was officially retired on 9 March 2007 at the age of 16. He was euthanized on 16 February 2014.
