= Vladimir Tuganov =

Russian equestrian

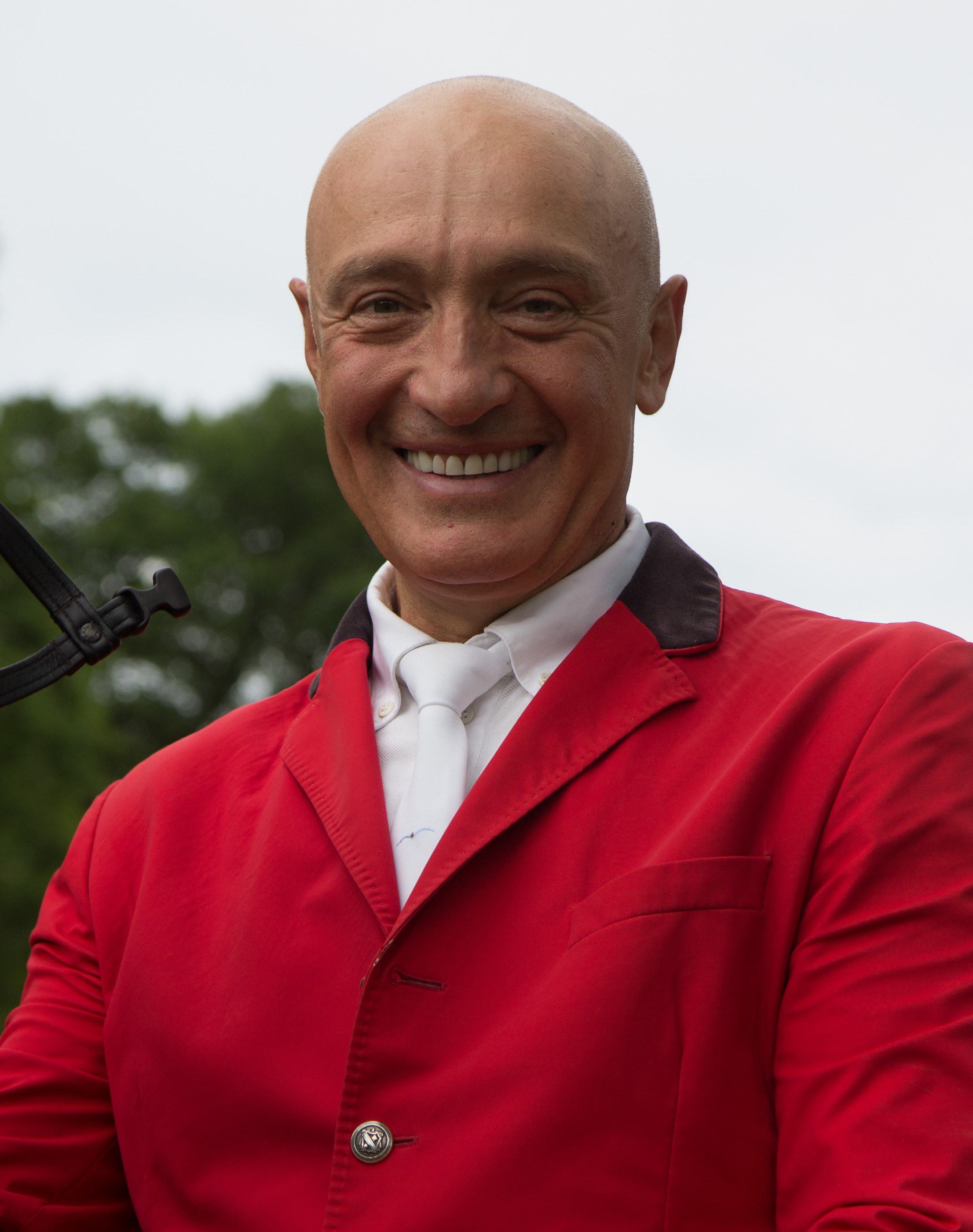
- Vladimir Tuganov in 2018

Personal information
- Nationality: Russian
- Born: 17 July 1961 (age 64) Vladikavkaz, Russia

Sport
- Sport: Equestrian

Vladimir Tuganov (Russian: Владимир Петрович Туганов, Iron Ossetic: Тугъанаты Петыры фырт Владимир, romanized: Tughanaty Petyry fyrt Vladimir; born 17 July 1961) is a Russian equestrian. He competed in two events at the 2004 Summer Olympics. Formerly the vice-president of the Russian Equestrian Federation, Tuganov resigned from his position in 2023 after changing his sporting nationality to Palestine with the aim of competing in the Paris 2024 Olympic Games.
