= Daniel Meech =

New Zealand equestrian

Personal information
- Full name: Daniel William Meech
- Born: 19 November 1973 (age 52) Hastings, New Zealand

Sport
- Country: New Zealand
- Sport: Equestrian
- Event: Show jumping

Daniel William Meech (born 19 November 1973) is a New Zealand equestrian.

Meech was born in Hastings in 1973. He received his education at Lindisfarne College and at Hastings Boys' High School. Aged 20, he relocated to Germany for an apprenticeship with German showjumper Paul Schockemöhle.

Meech competed in individual jumping at the 1996 Summer Olympics in Atlanta, and is New Zealand Olympian number 730. He competed in individual and team jumping at the 2004 Summer Olympics in Athens, In Athens, he was third going into the final round and would have won gold by dropping one bar, but he dropped three bars and came in 12th place. Meech was nominated for the 2008 Summer Olympics in Beijing, but his horse Sorbas was injured and he was replaced by Kirk Webby.
