= Guy Thomas =

New Zealand equestrian

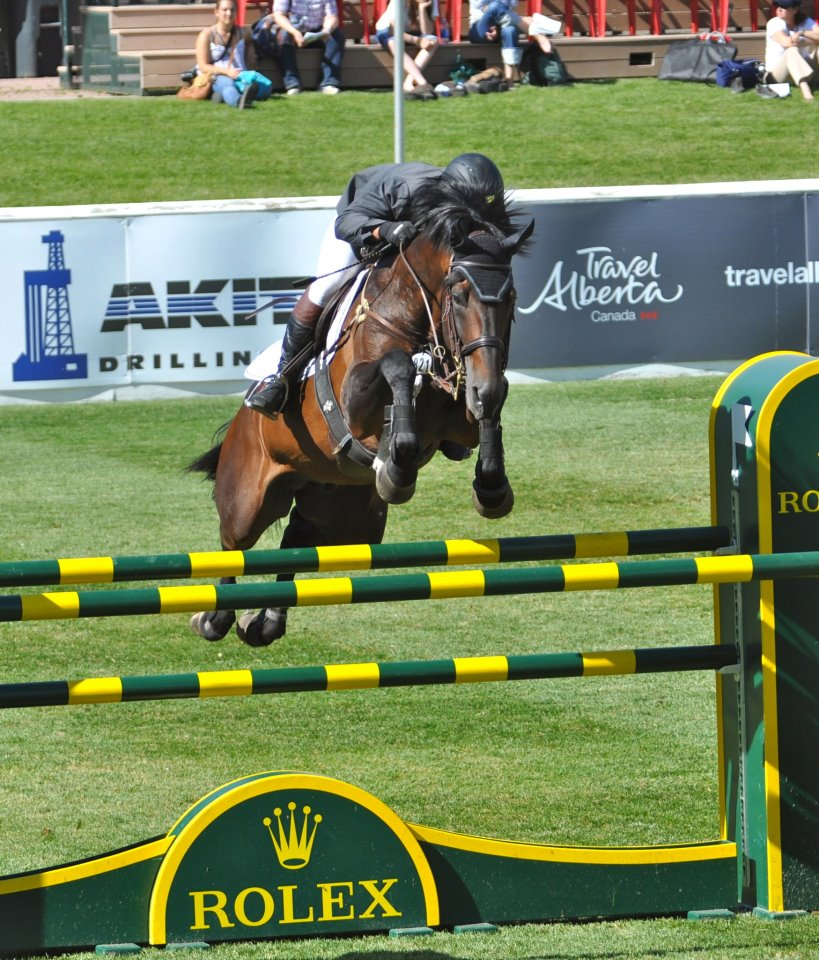
- Thomas on Peterbilt at Spruce Meadows

Personal information
- Nationality: New Zealand
- Discipline: Show Jumping
- Born: 30 August 1977 (age 48); Burson, California
- Height: 1.8 m (5.9 ft)
- Weight: 88.5 kg (195 lb)
- Horse(s): Peterbilt, Magno, Acomulado, S&L Elite, Queen B

Guy Thomas (born 30 August 1977) is a New Zealand equestrian. His speciality is show jumping, either individually or as part of a team.

== Personal life ==
Guy Thomas was born 30 August 1977 in Burson, California, the son of Graeme "Butch" Thomas and Lu Thomas, both former international riders.

Guy Thomas grew up in a riding family. His parents, Graeme "Butch" and Lu Thomas, are highly successful riders and trainers, both having competed in the FEI World Cup Finals. Guy was a natural rider from the time he started riding at the age of two and a half. During his upbringing, rather than exerting pressure to join the family business, his parents pledged their support for whatever life path Guy ultimately chose to pursue.

== Career ==
Guy Thomas competed at the 2004 Summer Olympics in Athens, Greece for the New Zealand Olympic team and also rode for the New Zealand Team at the 2010 World Equestrian Games in Lexington, KY. He qualified for and competed in the 2008 Rolex FEI World Cup Jumping Finals in Gothenburg, Sweden.

=== Career Grand Prix Highlights ===
- 2013
  - 1st Place, Menlo Grand Prix, Menlo Charity Horse Show in Atherton, CA with Peterbilt
  - 1st Place, Golden State Horse Show Grand Prix in Sacramento, CA with Peterbilt
  - 1st Place, HMI Equestrian Challenge Grand Prix in Sonoma, CA with Peterbilt
- 2012
  - 1st Place, Menlo Grand Prix, Menlo Charity Horse Show in Atherton, CA with Peterbilt
- 2011
  - 1st Place, Pebble Beach Equestrian Classic III Grand Prix in Pebble Beach, CA with Lavito
  - 2nd Place, Pebble Beach Equestrian Classic III Grand Prix in Pebble Beach, CA with Acomulado
  - 1st Place, Pebble Beach Equestrian Classic II Grand Prix in Pebble Beach, CA with Lavito
- 2010
  - 1st Place, Cargill Cup, Spruce Meadows Canada One in Calgary, Alberta, Canada with Peterbilt
  - 1st Place, Pickwick Summer Classic Grand Prix in Sacramento, CA with Peterbilt
  - 1st Place, Golden State Horse Show Grand Prix in Sacramento, CA with Peterbilt
  - 2nd Place, Golden State Horse Show Grand Prix in Sacramento, CA with Carino
  - 1st Place, Capital City Classic Horse Show Grand Prix in Sacramento, CA with Peterbilt
  - 2nd Place, Capital City Classic Horse Show Grand Prix in Sacramento, CA with Carino
  - 2nd Place, HITS Thermal $300k Lamborghini Grand Prix of the Desert in Thermal, CA with Peterbilt
  - 1st Place, HITS Thermal Grand Prix in Thermal, CA with Carino
  - 1st Place, HITS Thermal Purnia Mills Grand Prix in Thermal, CA with Peterbilt
- 2009
  - 1st Place, Pickwick Summer Classic Grand Prix in Sacramento, CA with Peterbilt
  - 1st Place, Showpark Jumper Classic Grand Prix in Del Mar, CA with Peterbilt

== Horses ==
| Name | Age | Gender | Colour | Breed | Sire | Dam | Damsire | References |
|---|---|---|---|---|---|---|---|---|
| Peterbilt | 13 Years | Stallion | Dark Bay | Holstein | Liocalyon | Jeribos | Concorde | |
| Magno | 13 Years | Stallion | Grey | Selle Français | Maui LS | unk. | unk. | |
| Acomulado | 10 Years | Gelding | Bay | Warmblood | Acorado | unk. | unk. | |
| S&L Elite | 8 Years | Gelding | Chestnut | Belgian Warmblood | Action Breaker | unk. | Galoubet | |
| Queen B | 6 Years | Mare | Chestnut | Belgian Warmblood | Uno de Laubry | Queen Charlotte B | unk. | |
| NZ Madison | 1994 | Mare | Bay | Clydesdale / NZ TB | N/A | N/A | N/A | |
