= Yuka Watanabe =

Japanese equestrian (born 1967)

Personal information
- Nationality: Japanese
- Born: 26 August 1967 (age 58)

Sport
- Sport: Equestrian

Yuka Watanabe (born 26 August 1967) is a Japanese equestrian. She competed in two events at the 2004 Summer Olympics.
