= Roberto Arioldi =

Italian equestrian (born 1955)

Personal information
- Nationality: Italian
- Born: 29 November 1955 (age 70) Monza, Italy

Sport
- Sport: Equestrian
Medal record
Equestrian
Representing Italy
Mediterranean Games
| Gold medal – first place | 2005 Almería | Team jumping |
| Silver medal – second place | 1997 Bari | Team jumping |

Roberto Arioldi (born 29 November 1955) is an Italian equestrian. He competed in two events at the 2004 Summer Olympics.
