= Danai Tsatsou =

Greek equestrian (born 1980)

Personal information
- Nationality: Greek
- Born: 12 July 1980 (age 44); Athens, Greece

Sport
- Sport: Equestrian

Danai Tsatsou (born 12 July 1980) is a Greek equestrian. She competed in two events at the 2004 Summer Olympics.
