= Ju Jeong-hyeon =

South Korean equestrian (born 1974)

Personal information
- Nationality: South Korean
- Born: 31 August 1974 (age 51)

Sport
- Sport: Equestrian
Medal record
Equestrian
Representing South Korea
Asian Games
Silver medal – second place	2006 Doha	Team jumping
Bronze medal – third place	2006 Doha	Individual jumping

Ju Jeong-hyeon (Korean: 주정현, also transliterated Joo Jung-hyun, born 31 August 1974) is a South Korean equestrian. He competed in two events at the 2004 Summer Olympics.
