= Hannah Roberson-Mytilinaiou =

Greek equestrian (born 1967)

Personal information
- Nationality: Greek, British
- Born: 30 April 1967 (age 57); Athens, Greece

Sport
- Sport: Equestrian

Hannah Roberson-Mytilinaiou (born 30 April 1967) is a Greek equestrian. She competed in two events at the 2004 Summer Olympics.

Roberson-Mytilinaiou is the mother of professional show-jumper Ioli Mytilineou, who has been nominated to compete at the 2024 Olympic Games.
