= U Jung-ho =

South Korean equestrian

Personal information
- Nationality: South Korean
- Born: 19 March 1971 (age 55)
- Height: 168 cm (5 ft 6 in) (2004)
- Weight: 58 kg (128 lb) (2004)

Sport
- Sport: Equestrian
Medal record
Equestrian
Representing South Korea
Asian Games
Silver medal – second place	1998 Bangkok	Team jumping

U Jung-ho (Korean: 우정호, also transliterated Woo Jung-ho, born 19 March 1971) is a South Korean equestrian. He competed in two events at the 2004 Summer Olympics.
