= Gustavo Ramos Hernández =

Mexican equestrian

Personal information
- Born: 16 June 1974 (age 50); Mexico City, Mexico

Sport
- Sport: Equestrian

Gustavo Ramos Hernández (born 16 June 1974) is a Mexican equestrian. He competed in two events at the 2004 Summer Olympics.
