= Burson, California =

Unincorporated community in California, United States

Burson
- Unincorporated community
- Location in California Burson (the United States)
- Coordinates: 38°11′02″N 120°53′26″W
- Country: United States
- State: California
- County: Calaveras County
- Elevation: 413 ft (126 m)

Burson is an unincorporated community in Calaveras County, California, United States. It lies at an elevation of 98 feet (45 m). Although unincorporated, Burson is served by the ZIP code of 95225.

== History ==
Burson was platted in 1884 when the San Joaquin and Sierra Nevada Railroad was extended to that point. The community was named for Daniel Smith Burson, the original owner of the town site. A post office has been in operation at Burson since 1884.

== Geography ==
Burson is located near Valley Springs and Rancho Calaveras, only a few miles away.

=== Climate ===
Burson has a Csa-Hot Summer Mediterranean climate typical of the Sierra Nevada foothills. Winters are cool and wet with mild days, chilly nights, and substantial rainfall. Summers are hot and dry with very hot days, cool nights, and minimal rainfall. Due to the orographic effect, rainfall in all seasons is significantly greater than on the valley floor to the west.

Climate data for Burson (Valley Springs)
Month	Jan	Feb	Mar	Apr	May	Jun	Jul	Aug	Sep	Oct	Nov	Dec	Year
Mean daily maximum °F (°C)	53 (12)	59 (15)	63 (17)	69 (21)	79 (26)	88 (31)	94 (34)	93 (34)	88 (31)	77 (25)	62 (17)	53 (12)	73.2 (22.9)
Daily mean °F (°C)	46.0 (7.8)	50.5 (10.3)	53.5 (11.9)	58.0 (14.4)	65.5 (18.6)	72.5 (22.5)	76.9 (24.9)	78.0 (25.6)	73.5 (23.1)	65.0 (18.3)	53.5 (11.9)	46.0 (7.8)	61.6 (16.4)
Mean daily minimum °F (°C)	39 (4)	42 (6)	44 (7)	47 (8)	52 (11)	57 (14)	62 (17)	62 (17)	59 (15)	53 (12)	45 (7)	39 (4)	50.1 (10.1)
Average precipitation inches (mm)	4.13 (105)	3.86 (98)	3.82 (97)	2.01 (51)	1.18 (30)	0.28 (7.1)	0 (0)	0.04 (1.0)	0.43 (11)	1.3 (33)	2.68 (68)	3.74 (95)	23.47 (596)
