= Federico Enrique Sztyrle =

Argentine equestrian

Personal information
- Born: 9 September 1964 (age 60); San Martín, Argentina

Sport
- Sport: Equestrian

Federico Enrique Sztyrle (born 9 September 1964) is an Argentine equestrian. He competed in two events at the 2004 Summer Olympics.
