= Peter Wylde =

American equestrian (born 1965)

Personal information
- Born: July 30, 1965 (age 61) Boston, Massachusetts, U.S.
Medal record
Equestrian
Representing the United States
Olympic Games
| Gold medal – first place | 2004 Athens | Team jumping |
Pan American Games
| Silver medal – second place | 1999 Winnipeg | Individual jumping |

Peter Wylde (born July 30, 1965) is an American show jumping competitor and Olympic champion.

At the 2004 Olympic Games in Athens, Wylde won the team jumping gold medal for the United States along with teammates McLain Ward, Beezie Madden and Chris Kappler.

== Early life and education ==
Wylde was born in Boston, Massachusetts. His hometown is Medfield, Massachusetts. Wylde trained at Joe and Fran Dotoli's Young Entry Stable for three years before winning the New England Horseman's Council's equitation final in 1981. He rode to victory on a Thoroughbred called Native Surf. The next year, Wylde won the Maclay National Equitation Championship at the National Horse Show, again riding Native Surf. Wylde attended Tufts University and was a member of Tufts Equestrian Team. As a student, he won the Intercollegiate Horse Show Association's prestigious Cacchione Cup in 1986.

== Career ==
Wylde started training and competing as a professional in 1988, shortly after graduating from Tufts University. For the next six years, he trained riders and competed in grand prix. He traveled to Switzerland for a year of training with Gerhard Etter. In 1996, Wylde won the President's Cup at the Washington International Horse Show. He represented the United States at the 1997 and 1999 World Cup Finals in Gothenburg, Sweden. In 1997, he won a grand prix during the Winter Equestrian Festival. In 1998, he had three grand prix wins and placed second at a USET World Equestrian Games Selection Trial. In 1999, he was champion of the Rolex-USET Show Jumping Championship and won team and individual silver medals at the Pan American Games.

In 2000, Wylde moved to Germany to work as a rider and trainer. That year, he won the Van Vlanderan Grand Prix in Belgium. In 2001, he was sixth in the World Cup Final. He competed for the United States at the 2002 Show Jumping World Championships. Riding Fein Cera, he won an individual bronze. At the 2004 Olympic Games in Athens, Wylde again rode Fein Cera, and won team gold for the United States.

Fein Cera was retired in 2007, and Wylde did not compete at the 2008 Olympic Games. In 2012, Wylde moved back to the United States. He is involved in the USHJA Emerging Athletes Program, and runs a horse training business.
