= Antonis Petris =

Greek equestrian (born 1958)

Personal information
- Nationality: Greek
- Born: 13 November 1958 (age 67) Nicosia, Cyprus

Sport
- Sport: Equestrian
Medal record
Equestrian
Representing Greece
Mediterranean Games
| Bronze medal – third place | 2009 Pescara | Team jumping |

Antonis Petris (born 13 November 1958) is a Greek equestrian. He competed in two events at the 2004 Summer Olympics.
