= Emmanouela Athanasiadi =

Greek equestrian (born 1965)

Personal information
- Nationality: Greek
- Born: 3 April 1965 (age 59)

Sport
- Sport: Equestrian

Emmanouela Athanasiadi (born 3 April 1965) is a Greek equestrian. She competed in two events at the 2004 Summer Olympics.
