= Thomas Velin =

Danish equestrian

Personal information
- Nationality: Danish
- Born: 14 April 1975 (age 49)

Sport
- Sport: Equestrian

Thomas Velin (born 14 April 1975) is a Danish equestrian. He competed at the 2000 Summer Olympics and the 2004 Summer Olympics.
