= Marion Hughes =

Irish equestrian

Personal information
- Nationality: Irish
- Born: 18 May 1968 (age 56); County Waterford, Ireland

Sport
- Sport: Equestrian

Marion Hughes (born 18 May 1968) is an Irish equestrian. She competed in two events at the 2004 Summer Olympics.
