= Fabio Crotta =

Swiss equestrian

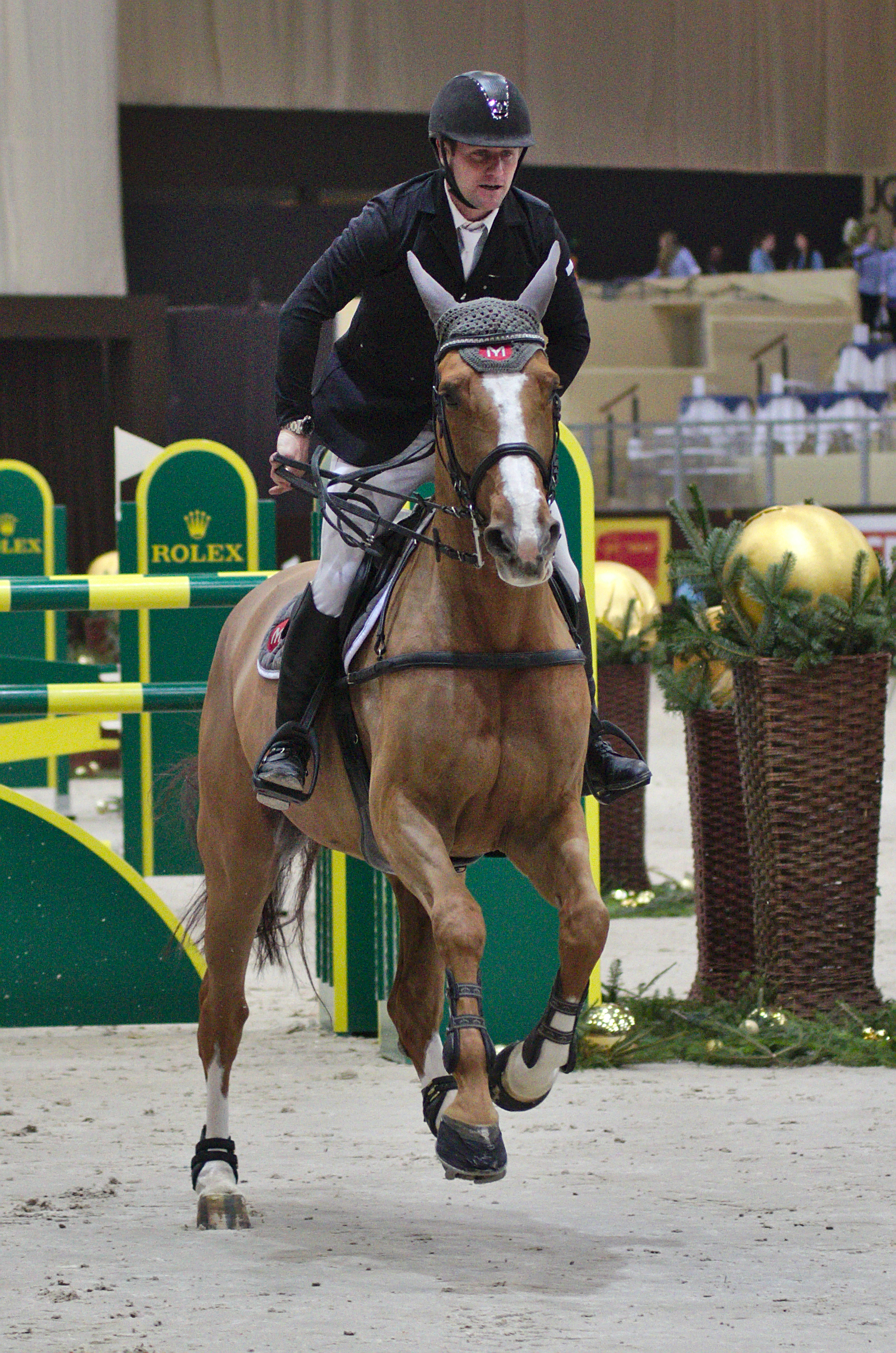
- Fabio Crotta in 2013

Personal information
- Nationality: Swiss
- Born: 4 September 1979 (age 45); Locarno, Switzerland

Sport
- Sport: Equestrian

Fabio Crotta (born 4 September 1979) is a Swiss equestrian. He competed in two events at the 2004 Summer Olympics.
