= Florian Angot =

French equestrian

Personal information
- Nationality: French
- Born: 7 May 1973 (age 53) Saint-Lô, France

Sport
- Sport: Equestrian

Florian Angot (French: [flɔʁjɑ̃ ɑ̃ɡo]; born 7 May 1973) is a French former equestrian. He competed in two events at the 2004 Summer Olympics.
