= Bruno Broucqsault =

French equestrian

Personal information
- Nationality: French
- Born: 15 January 1973 (age 52)

Sport
- Sport: Equestrian

Bruno Broucqsault (born 15 January 1973) is a French equestrian. He competed in two events at the 2004 Summer Olympics. In April 2004 in Milan, he won the Show Jumping World Cup on the horse Dileme de Cephe.
