= Ibrahim Bisharat =

Jordanian equestrian

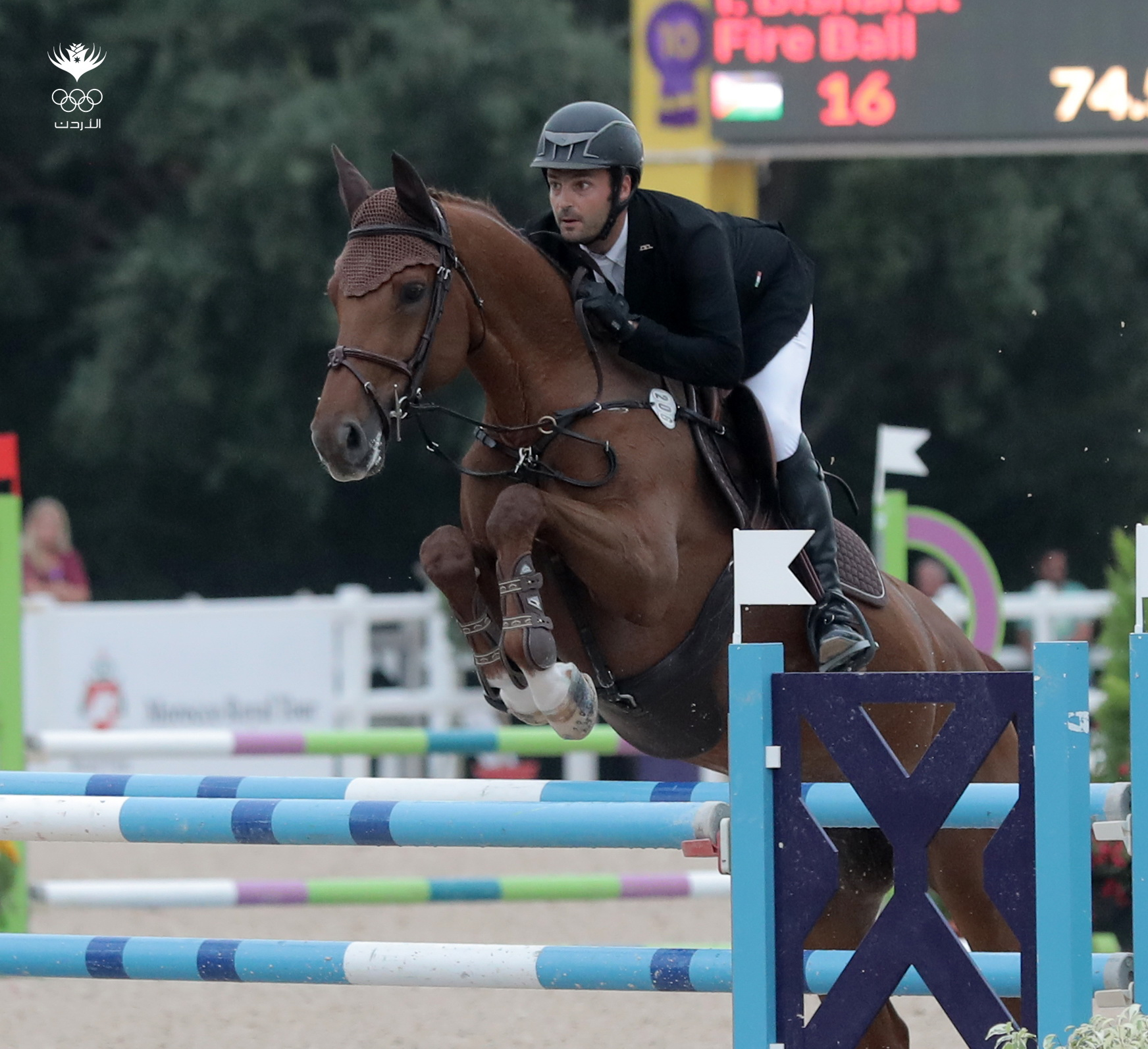

Personal information
- Full name: Ibrahim Hani Bisharat
- Nationality: Jordan
- Discipline: Show jumping
- Born: February 22, 1984 (age 42); Amman, Jordan
- Height: 5 ft 9 in (1.75 m)
- Weight: 146 lb (66 kg; 10 st 6 lb)
- Horse(s): Qwinto, Sam-Sam, Vrieda O, Blushing, Lesther

Ibrahim Hani Bisharat (Arabic: ابراهيم هاني بشارات; born February 22, 1984, in Amman) is a Jordanian equestrian rider. He is a four-time Olympian and is currently ranked no. 350 in the world by the Longiness Ranking of the Fédération Équestre Internationale (FEI).

== Career ==
At age twenty, Bisharat made his official debut for the 2004 Summer Olympics in Athens, where he competed in the individual jumping event, along with his horse Qwinto. He placed fifty-second at the end of qualifying rounds, with a total of forty-two penalties.

At the 2008 Summer Olympics in Beijing, Bisharat rode his second horse Sam-Sam in the individual jumping event, where he received a total of forty-one penalties in the second qualifying round, and was thereby eliminated from the competition.

At the 2012 Summer Olympics in London, Bisharat selected his third and current horse Vrieda O to ride and compete for the third time in the individual jumping event. Unlike his two previous games, Bisharat was immediately eliminated at the first stage of the qualifying rounds after knocking down three fences, and incurring time penalties, which placed him in the bottom fifteen places of a seventy-five strong field.

Bisharat became the first Jordanian athlete to comepete in four different Olympic Games when he competed in the 2020 Summer Olympics with his gelding Blushing, ultimately withdrawing from the competition.

Bisharat is currently coached by Dutch-born Belgian equestrian rider Jos Lansink, a seven-time Olympian and gold medalist for the jumping event at the 1992 Summer Olympics in Barcelona, Spain.

== Personal life ==
Bisharat is the son of Jordanian equestrian Hani Bisharat. He manages the Bisharat Stables in Essen, Belgium alongside his father.
