= Lucas Werthein =

Argentine equestrian

Personal information
- Born: 6 October 1981 (age 43); Buenos Aires, Argentina

Sport
- Sport: Equestrian

Lucas Werthein (born 6 October 1981) is an Argentine equestrian. He competed in two events at the 2004 Summer Olympics.
