= Gregorio Werthein =

Argentine equestrian

Personal information
- Born: 15 September 1983 (age 41); Buenos Aires, Argentina

Sport
- Sport: Equestrian

Gregorio Werthein (born 15 September 1983) is an Argentine equestrian. He competed in two events at the 2004 Summer Olympics.
