= Vincenzo Chimirri =

Italian equestrian

Personal information
- Nationality: Italian
- Born: 7 December 1973 (age 51); Catanzaro, Italy

Sport
- Sport: Equestrian
- Club: Fiamme Oro

Vincenzo Chimirri (born 7 December 1973) is an Italian equestrian. He competed in two events at the 2004 Summer Olympics.
