= Wim Schröder =

Dutch equestrian

Wilhelmus Gerardus "Wim" Schröder (born 17 April 1971, in Almelo) is a Dutch show jumping equestrian.

Wim Schröder represented the Netherlands at the 2004 Summer Olympics where he took part in the individual jumping competition and the show jumping team event, alongside Gerco Schröder, Leopold van Asten and Gert-Jan Bruggink. As an individual driving on his horse "Montreal", Schröder reached the final, where he ended up on the 28th position. With the Dutch show jumping team he finished fourth with a total of 24 penalty points.

His twin brother Ben Schröder and his younger brother Gerco Schröder are also Dutch equestrians (show jumping).
