= Leopold van Asten =

Dutch equestrian

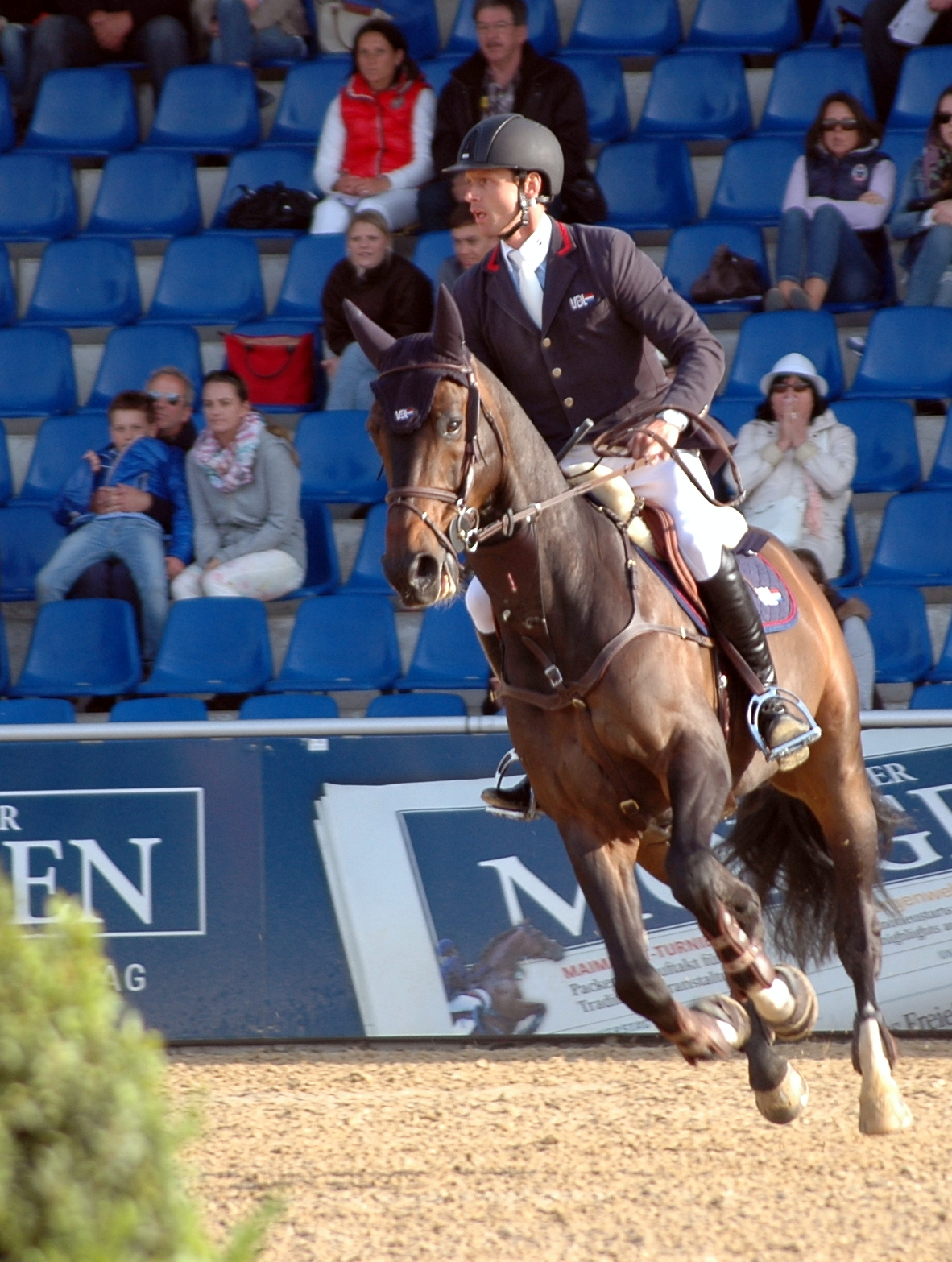

Leopold Leonardus Petronella van Asten (born 19 October 1976 in Venray) is a Dutch show jumping equestrian.

Van Asten represented the Netherlands at the 2004 Summer Olympics, where he competed in both the individual jumping competition and the show jumping team event alongside Gerco Schröder, Wim Schröder and Gert-Jan Bruggink. Individually, Van Asten reached the final with his horse, Joel, and finished in 30th position. With the Dutch show jumping team, he finished fourth with a total of 24 penalty points.
