= Gerco Schröder =

Dutch equestrian

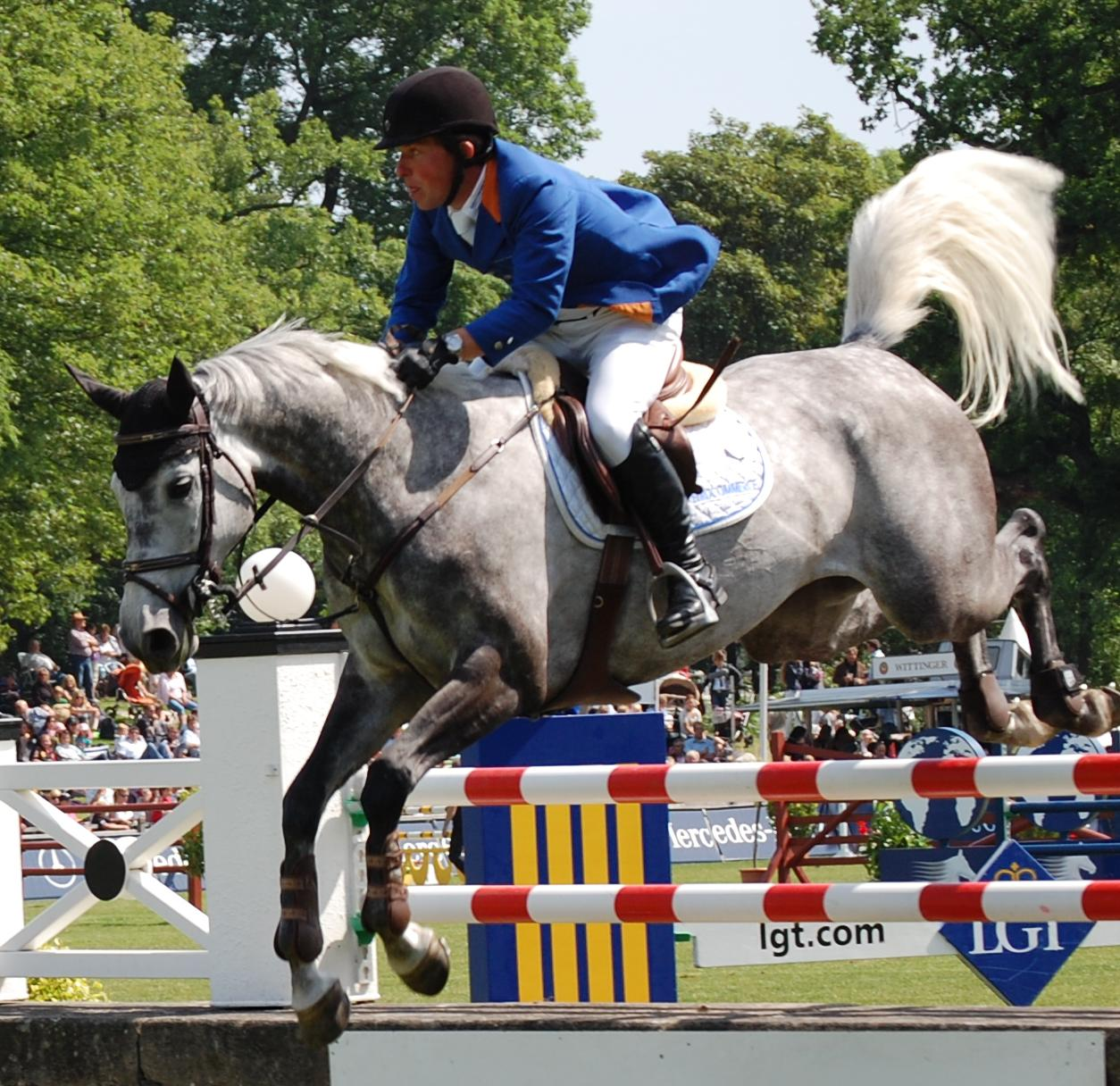

Personal information
- Full name: Gerco Bernardus Schröder
- Nationality: Netherlands
- Discipline: Show jumping
- Born: 28 July 1978 (age 48); Tubbergen, Overijssel
- Height: 5 ft 5 in (1.65 m)
- Weight: 157 lb (71 kg; 11 st 3 lb)
- Horse: London
Medal record
Representing Netherlands
Equestrian
Olympic Games
| Silver medal – second place | 2012 London | Individual jumping |
| Silver medal – second place | 2012 London | Team jumping |
World Championships
| Gold medal – first place | 2006 Aachen | Team jumping |
| Gold medal – first place | 2014 Normandy | Team jumping |
European Championships
| Gold medal – first place | 2007 Mannheim | Team jumping |
| Gold medal – first place | 2015 Aachen | Team jumping |
| Bronze medal – third place | 2005 San Patrignano | Team jumping |

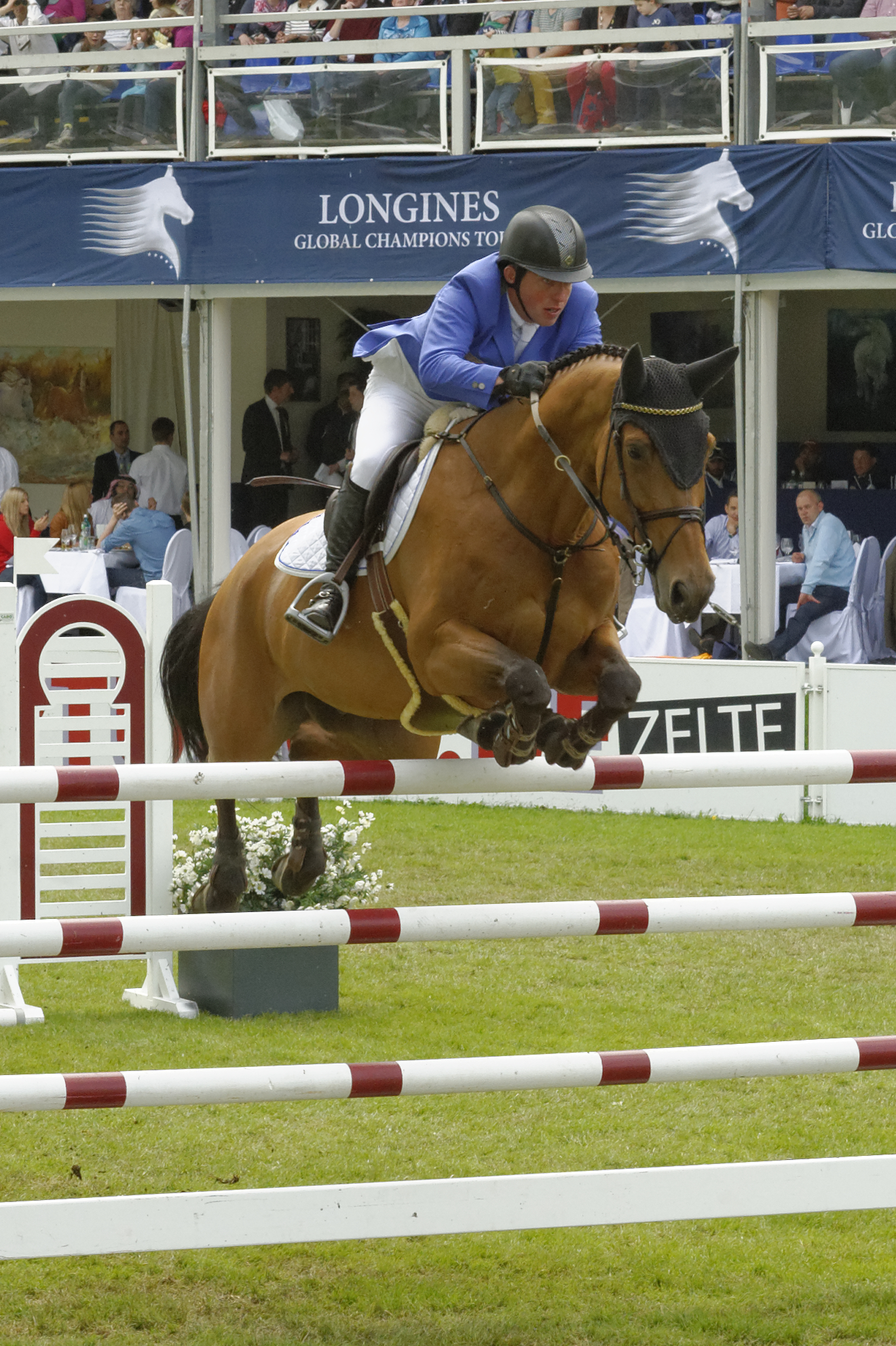
Gerco Schröder on "Seoul" at the Internationalen PfingstTurnier Wiesbaden 2013

Gerco Bernardus Schröder (born 28 July 1978, in Tubbergen) is a Dutch show jumping equestrian. He currently ranks third on the FEI Rolex Ranking List.

Gerco Schröder represented the Netherlands at the 2004 Summer Olympics where he took part in the individual jumping competition and the show jumping team event alongside Wim Schröder, Leopold van Asten and Gert-Jan Bruggink. As an individual driving on his horse 'Monaco', Schröder was eliminated in the qualification round, ending up on the 48th position. He was 21st after the first qualification round, but 8 penalty points in his second round eliminated him. With the Dutch show jumping team he finished fourth with a total of 24 penalty points.

In 2006 Schröder won team gold alongside Jeroen Dubbeldam, Piet Raijmakers and Albert Zoer at the World Equestrian Games in Aachen.

In 2010 he won the Dutch national championship.

At the 2012 Olympic Games in London, Schröder won the silver medal in the individual jumping competition after a jump-off for silver and bronze with Ireland's Cian O'Connor. He was also part of the Dutch silver medal-winning team in the team jumping event.

At the 2013 CHI Al Shaqab event in Doha, Qatar, Schröder and his horse London won the CSI 5* Grand Prix title.

== Family ==
Schröder has a wife named Evelien, and together they have a son named Thomas. When asked what his hobbies were, he said "spending time with his family".

His older brothers Ben and Wim are also Dutch equestrians (show jumping).
