= Chris Kappler =

American show jumper

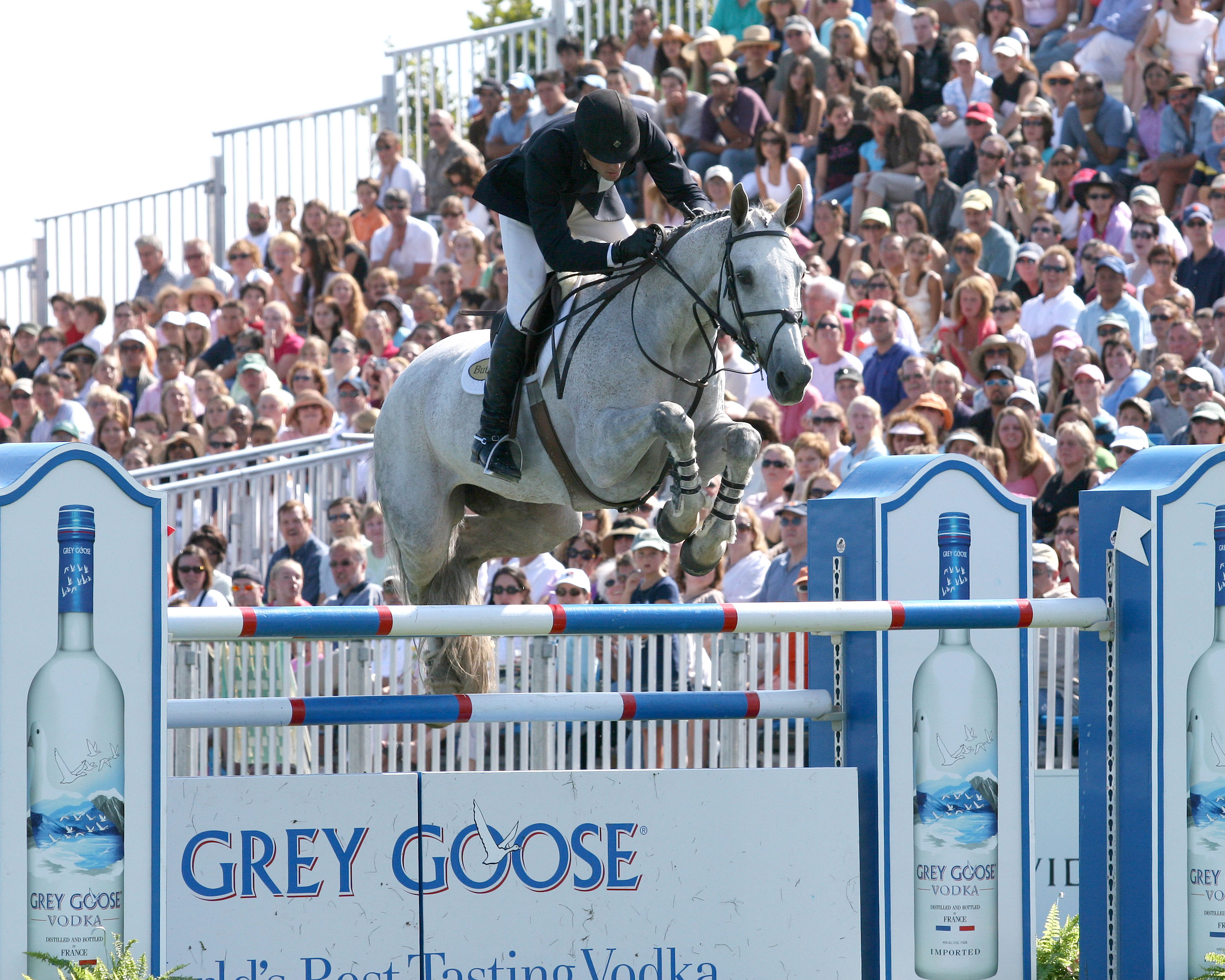

Personal information
- Full name: Chris Kappler
- Nationality: United States
- Discipline: Show jumping
- Born: February 9, 1967 (age 59); St. Charles, Illinois, U.S.
- Height: 6 ft 3 in (1.91 m)
- Weight: 159 lb (72 kg; 11 st 5 lb)
Medal record
Equestrian
Representing the United States
Olympic Games
Gold medal – first place	2004 Athens	Team jumping
Silver medal – second place	2004 Athens	Individual jumping
Pan American Games
Gold medal – first place	2003 Santo Domingo	Team jumping
Silver medal – second place	2003 Santo Domingo	Individual jumping

Chris Kappler (born February 9, 1967) is an American show jumper and horse trainer. He is an Olympic gold and silver medalist, and the winner of over 100 Grand Prixs. He is a founder of the North American Riders Group.

== Early life ==
Kappler grew up in Barrington, Illinois. He started riding at age nine, and began his show career training with Alex Jayne. He was discovered by George Morris and trained at Morris' stable, Hunterdon. He placed second in the USEF Medal Finals, third in the ASPCA Maclay Finals, and second in the USET Talent Search Finals.

== Career ==
Kappler worked for George Morris for almost 25 years. Kappler was named Midwest Rider of the Year in 1987, 1988, 1989 and 1991. In 1989, he won the Lionel Guerrand-Hermes Trophy. He won the American Invitational and American Gold Cup three times each, and won the American Grand Prix Championship once. At the 2003 Pan American Games, Kappler won the team gold and individual silver riding Royal Kaliber. Also in 2003, Kappler was named the Equestrian of the Year by the United States Equestrian Federation. In 2004, Kappler represented the United States at the Olympic Games. Riding Royal Kaliber, he won team gold and individual silver. Kappler won the Budweiser Invitational in Tampa on his horse VDL Oranta in 2009.

Kappler was a US Team Selector for the 2015 Pan American Games and the 2016 Summer Olympics. Kappler has been a USEF committee member.

By 2018, Kappler decided to stop riding competitively and focus on training horses and riders. He often travels to teach clinics.

== Personal life ==
Kappler is a resident of the Pittstown section of Franklin Township, Hunterdon County, New Jersey.
