= Grant Cashmore =

New Zealand equestrian

Personal information
- Born: 12 September 1968 (age 57)

Sport
- Country: New Zealand
- Sport: Equestrian
- Event: Show jumping

Grant Cashmore (born 12 September 1968) is a New Zealand equestrian. He competed in show jumping at the 2004 Summer Olympics in Athens.
