= Bruno Chimirri =

Italian equestrian

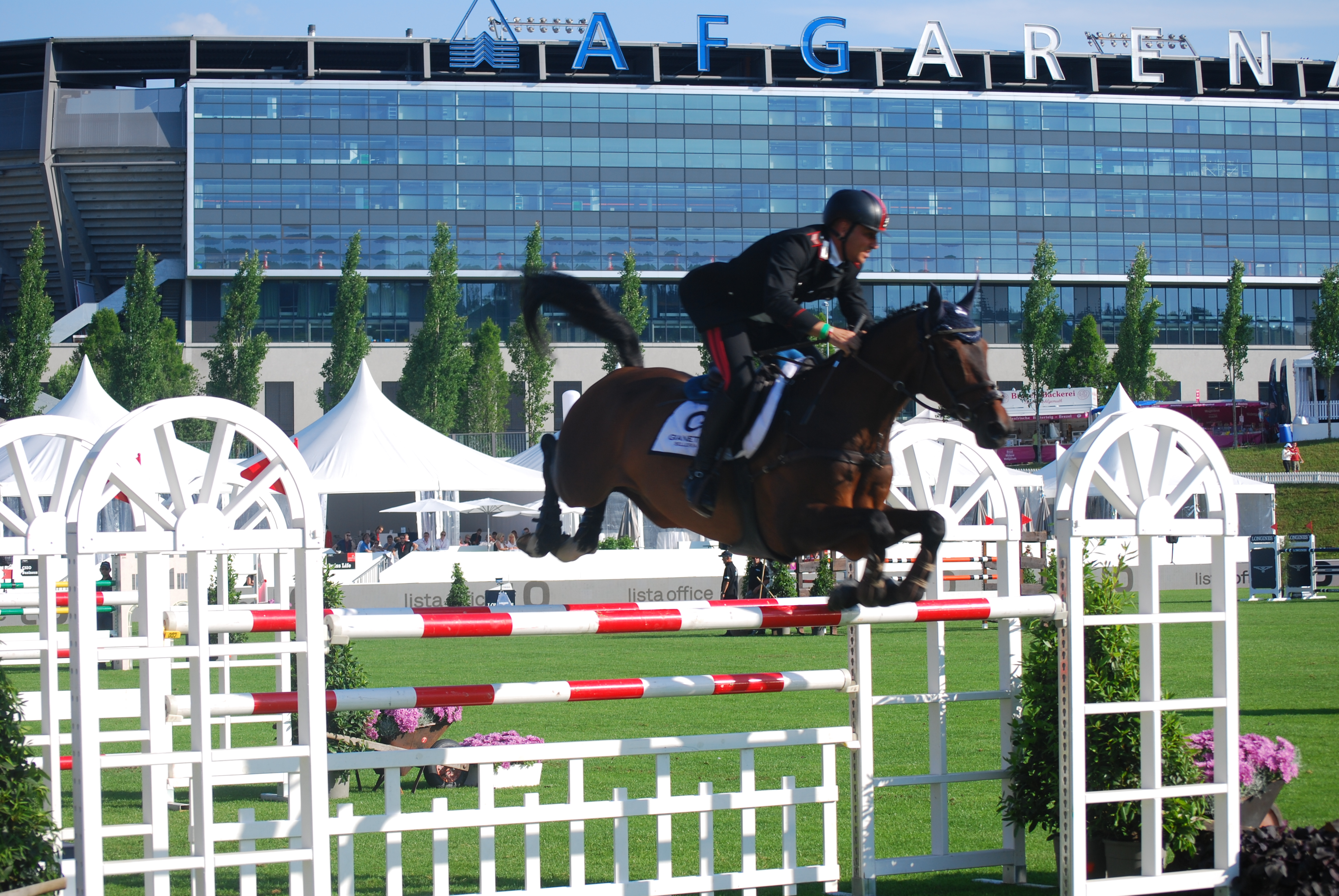

Personal information
- Nationality: Italian
- Born: 13 November 1971 (age 53); Catanzaro, Italy

Sport
- Sport: Equestrian

Bruno Chimirri (born 13 November 1971) is an Italian equestrian. He competed in two events at the 2004 Summer Olympics.
