= Otto Becker (equestrian) =

German equestrian (born 1958)

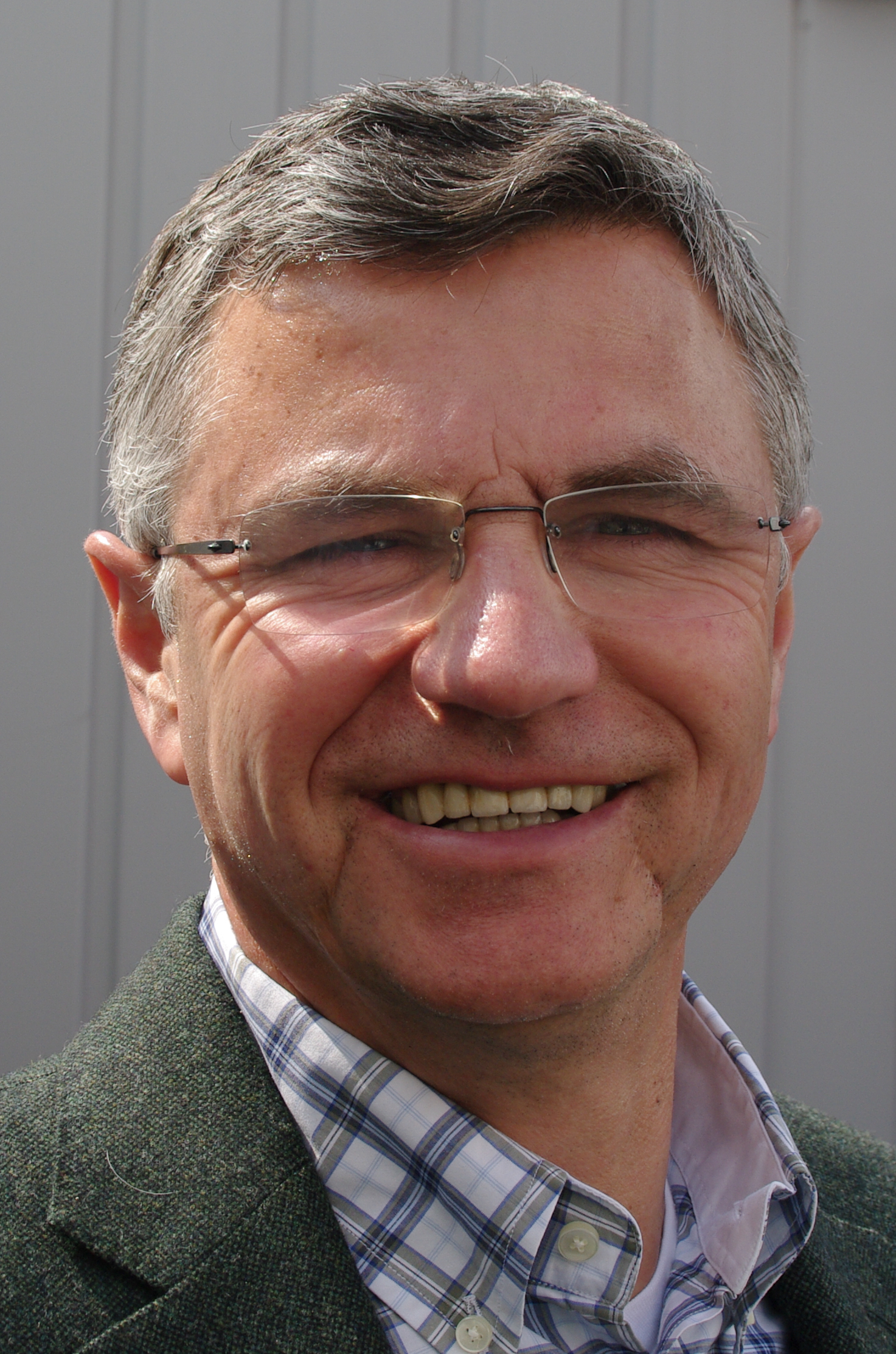

Medal record

Men's equestrian

Representing West Germany

World Championships
Silver medal – second place	1990 Stockholm	Team jumping

Representing Germany

Olympic Games
Gold medal – first place	2000 Sydney	Team jumping
Bronze medal – third place	2004 Athens	Team jumping

Otto Becker (born 3 December 1958 in Großostheim) is a former German show jumping champion, Olympic champion from 2000. Since January 2009 he is the coach of the German show jumping team.

== Olympic record ==
Becker participated at the 2000 Summer Olympics in Sydney, where he won a gold medal in team show jumping, together with Lars Nieberg, Marcus Ehning and Ludger Beerbaum. He received a bronze medal in team show jumping in 2004.
