= Hwang Sun-won (equestrian) =

South Korean equestrian

Personal information
- Nationality: South Korean
- Born: 11 February 1974 (age 52)

Sport
- Sport: Equestrian
Medal record
Equestrian
Representing South Korea
Asian Games
Silver medal – second place	2006 Doha	Team jumping

Hwang Sun-won (Korean: 황순원, also transliterated Hwang Soon-won, born 11 February 1974) is a South Korean equestrian. He competed in two events at the 2004 Summer Olympics.
