= Ryuichi Obata =

Japanese equestrian

Personal information
- Nationality: Japanese
- Born: 9 February 1955 (age 70)

Sport
- Sport: Equestrian

Ryuichi Obata (born 9 February 1955) is a Japanese equestrian. He competed at the 1976 Summer Olympics, the 1984 Summer Olympics and the 2004 Summer Olympics.
