= Gert-Jan Bruggink =

Dutch equestrian

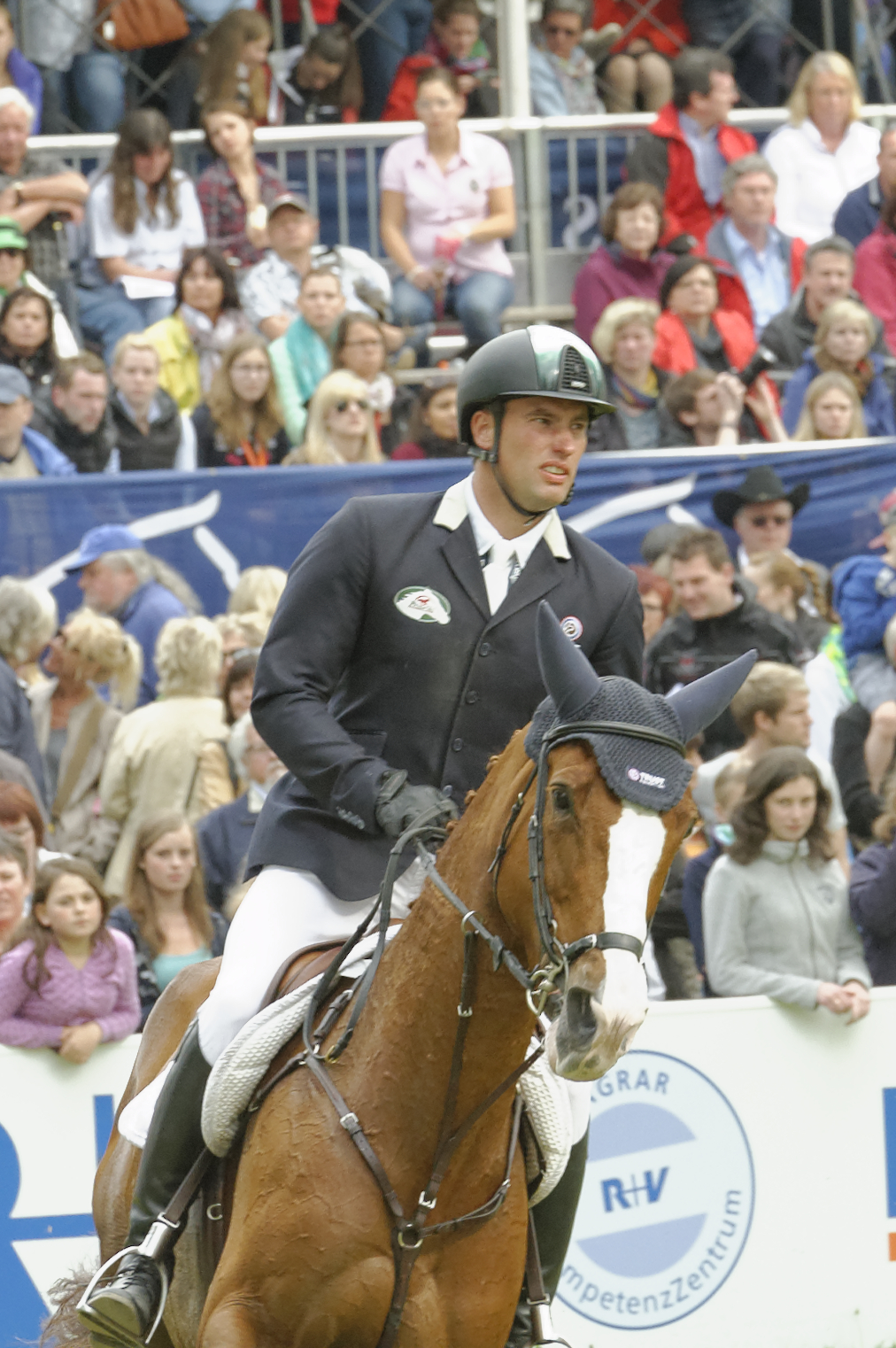
Gert-Jan Bruging with Andrea at Internationalem Pfingst Turnier Wiesbaden 2013

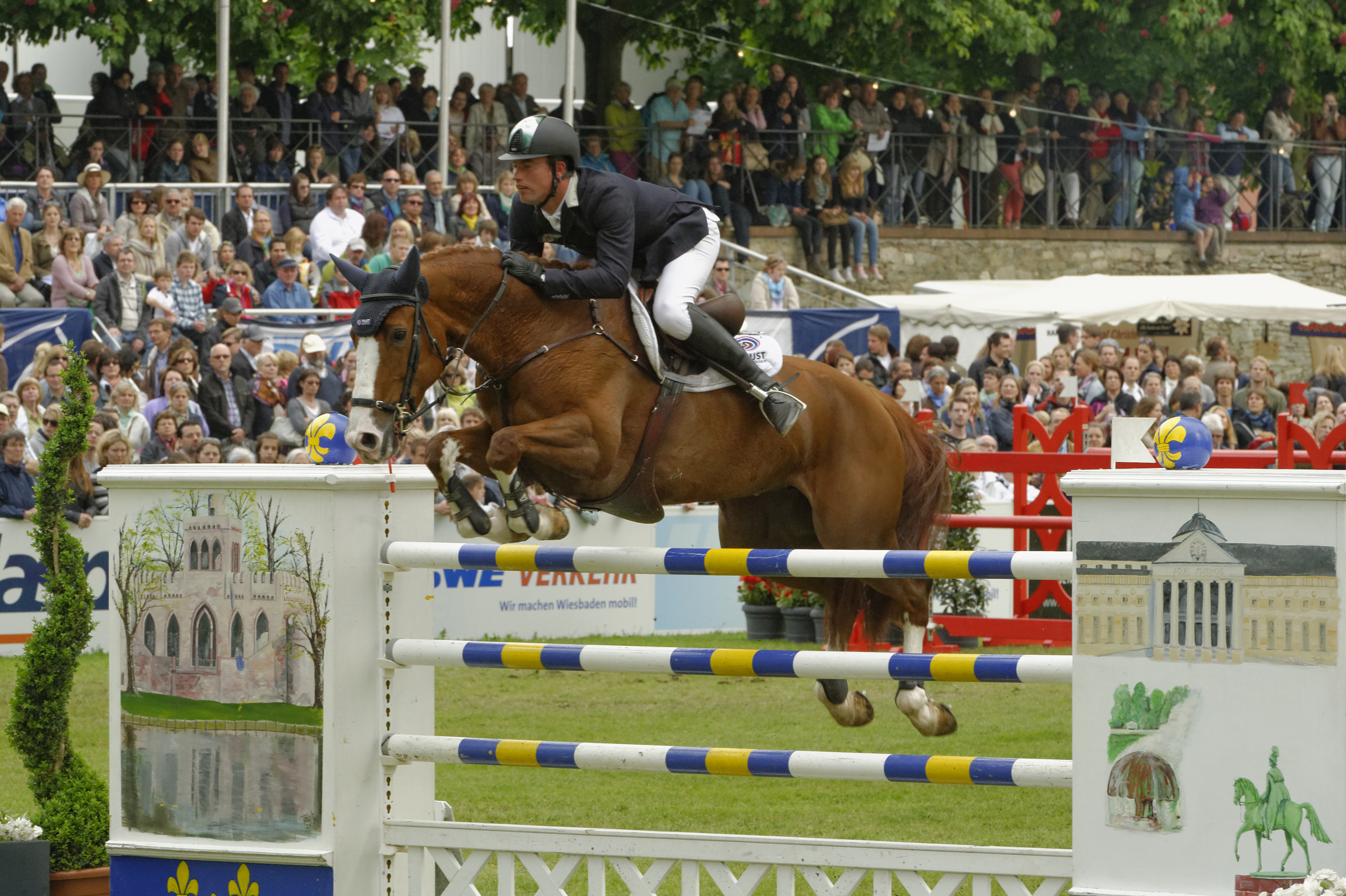
Gert-Jan Bruging with Andrea at Internationalem Pfingst Turnier Wiesbaden 2013

Gert Jan Jozef "Gert-Jan" Bruggink (born 17 March 1981 in Hengelo) is a Dutch show jumping equestrian.

Bruggink represented the Netherlands at the 2004 Summer Olympics where he took part in the individual jumping competition and the show jumping team event, alongside Gerco Schröder, Wim Schröder and Leopold van Asten. As an individual on his horse Joel, Bruggink reached the final where he ended up on the 33rd position. With the Dutch show jumping team he finished fourth with a total of 24 penalty points.

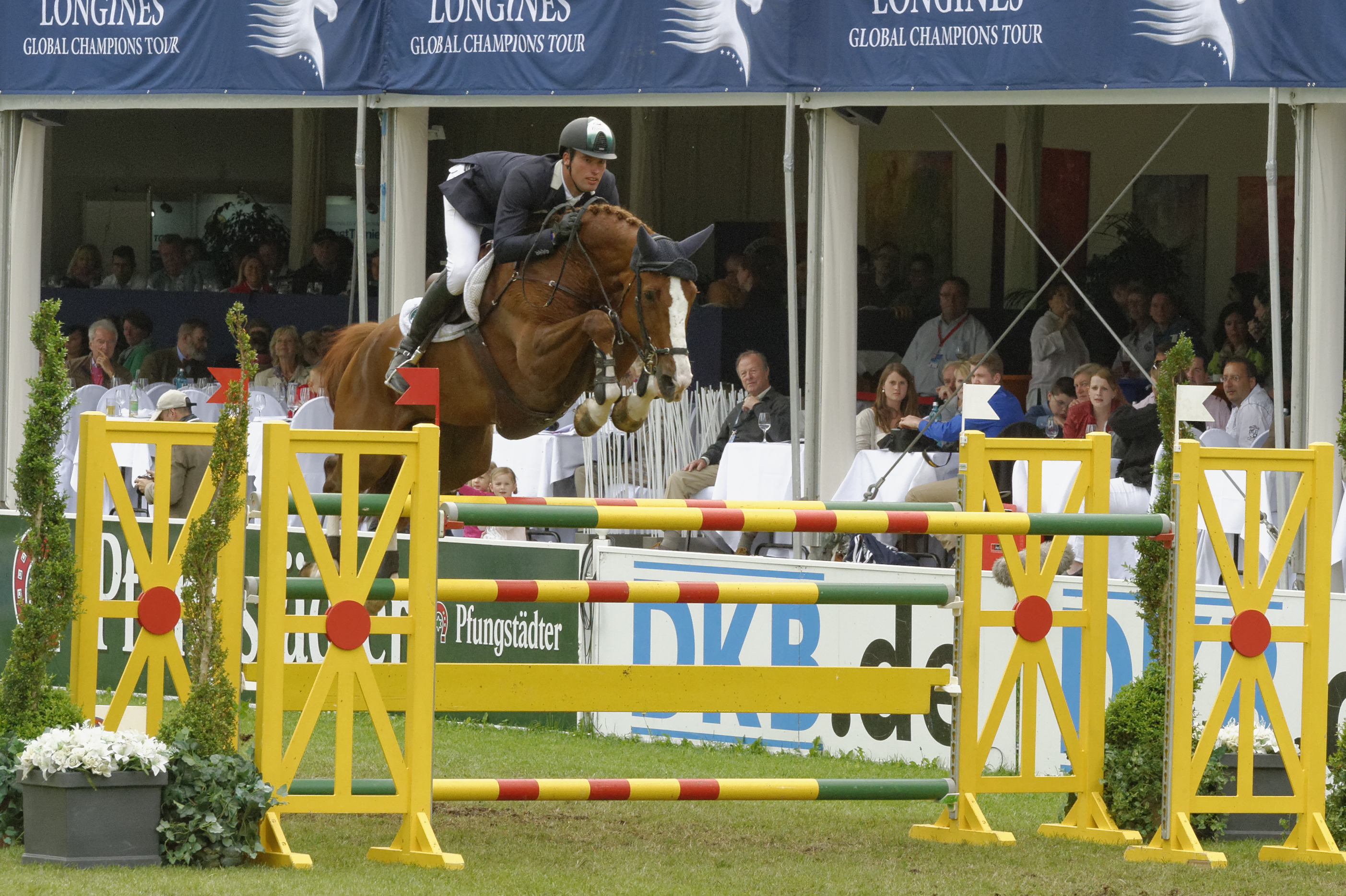

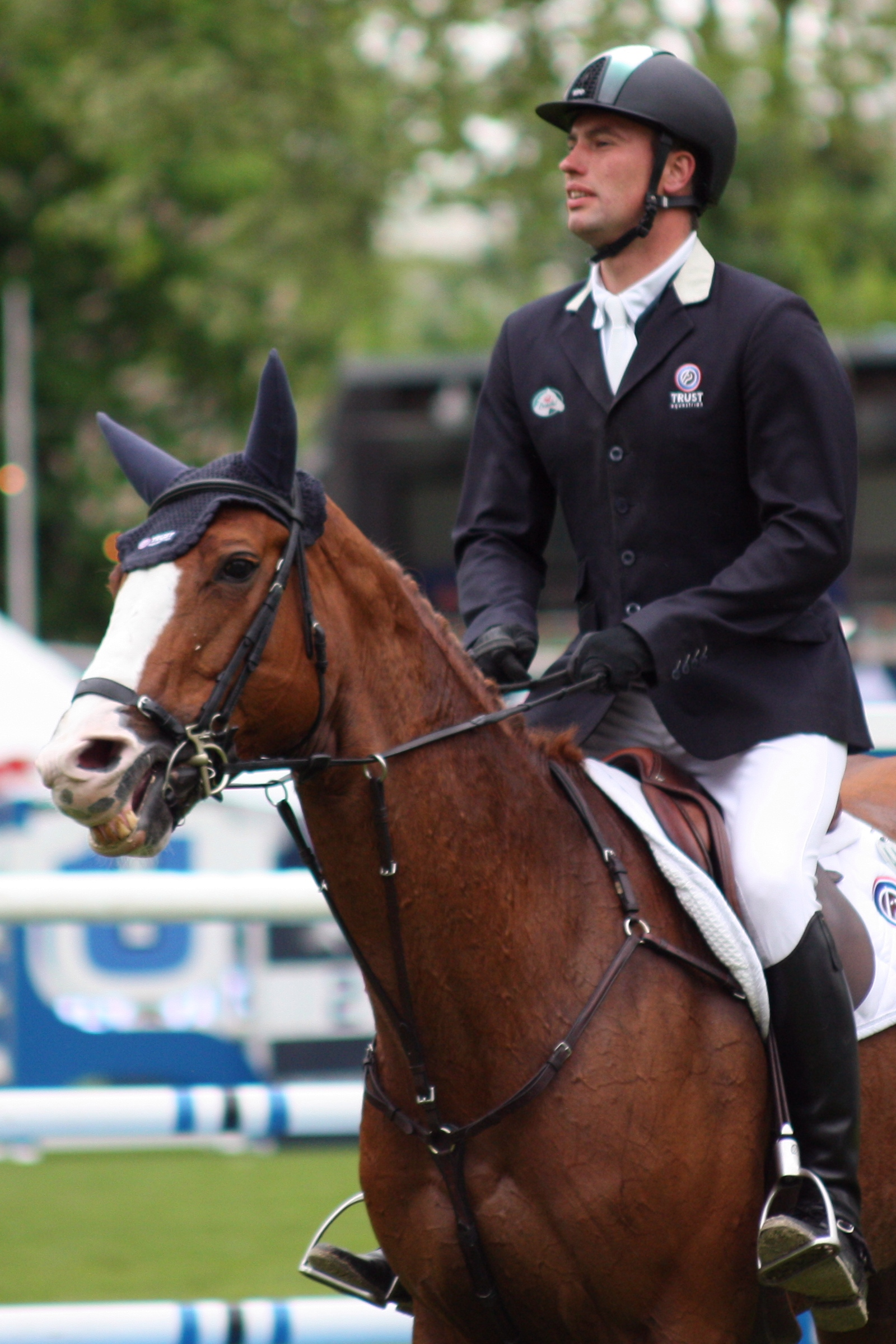

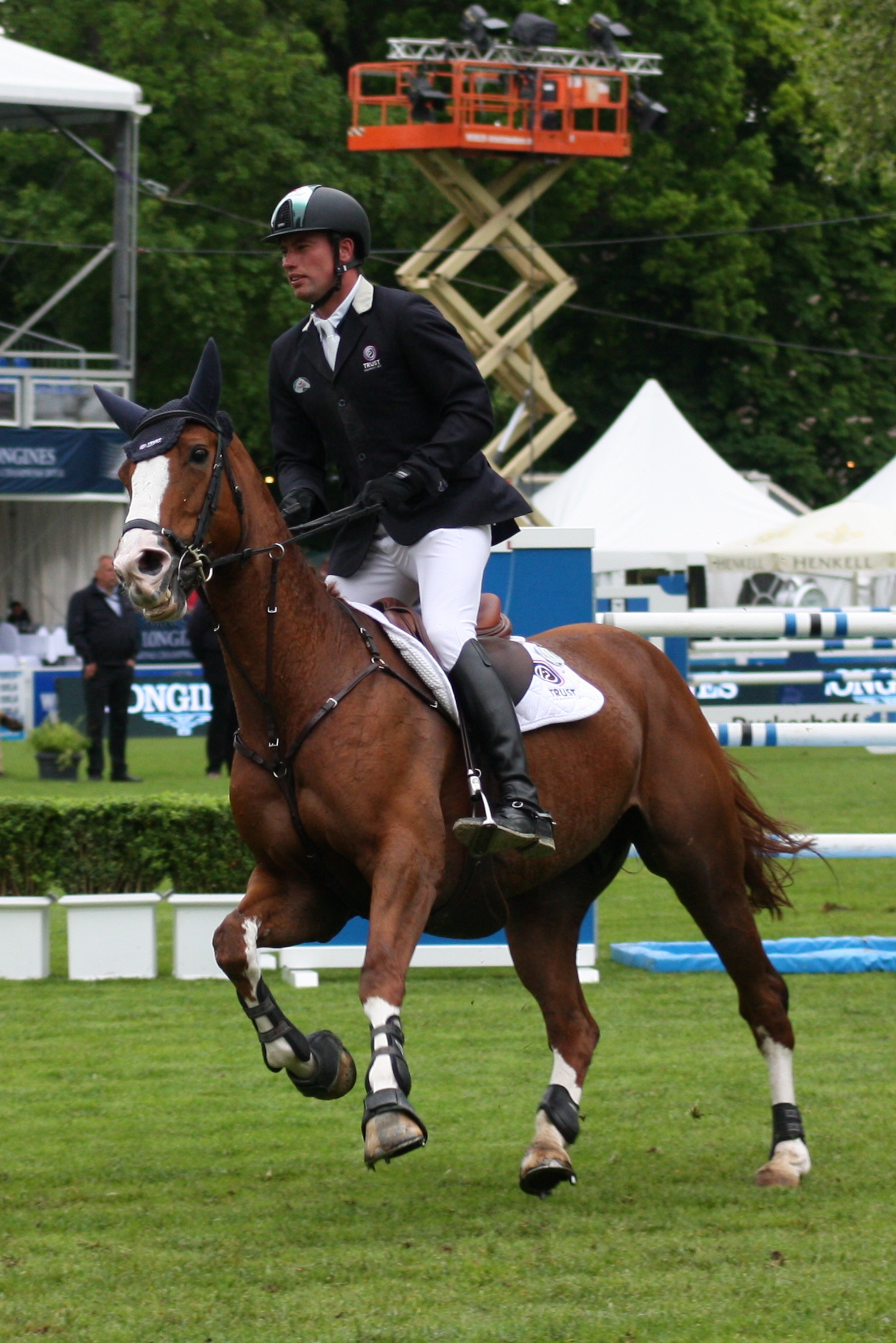
