= Peter Eriksson (equestrian) =

Swedish equestrian

Olympic medal record

Equestrian
Silver medal – second place	2004 Athens	Team jumping

Peter Eriksson (born 6 October 1959) is a 5'9" Swedish equestrian who's competed at several Summer Olympics. In the 2004 Olympics held in Athens, Greece, Eriksson competed aboard a gray stallion named Cardento, and together they helped the Swedish Equestrian Team win a silver medal in Team Showjumping with their clear round and jump-off time of 45.51. For the following 2008 Summer Olympics held in Beijing, Eriksson competed on a dark bay stallion, Jaguar Mail, and placed 32nd overall in Individual Showjumping
