= Equestrian events at the 2004 Summer Olympics =

Equestrian at the Games of the XXVIII Olympiad
- Venue: Markopoulo Olympic Equestrian Centre
- Dates: 16–27 August 2004
- Competitors: 203 from 38 nations

Equestrian events at the 2004 Summer Olympics featured three equestrian disciplines: dressage, eventing and jumping. All three disciplines are further divided into individual and team contests for a total of six events.

The Markopoulo Olympic Equestrian Centre, on the outskirts of Markopoulo in the Attica region of Greece, hosted the dressage and jumping events while the eventing took place in the nearby Eventing Park.

== Medal table ==
| Rank | Nation | Gold | Silver | Bronze | Total |
|---|---|---|---|---|---|
| 1 | United States | 1 | 2 | 2 | 5 |
| 2 | Germany | 1 | 1 | 2 | 4 |
| 3 | Great Britain | 1 | 1 | 1 | 3 |
| 4 | Brazil | 1 | 0 | 0 | 1 |
| 4 | France | 1 | 0 | 0 | 1 |
| 4 | Netherlands | 1 | 0 | 0 | 1 |
| 7 | Spain | 0 | 1 | 1 | 2 |
| 8 | Sweden | 0 | 1 | 0 | 1 |
| Totals (8 entries) | | 6 | 6 | 6 | 18 |

== Medalists ==
| Games | Gold | Silver | Bronze |
|---|---|---|---|
| Individual dressage | Anky van Grunsven on Salinero; Netherlands | Ulla Salzgeber on Rusty; Germany | Beatriz Ferrer-Salat on Beauvalais; Spain |
| Team dressage | Germany; Heike Kemmer on Bonaparte; Hubertus Schmidt on Wansuela Suerte; Martin Schaudt on Weltall; Ulla Salzgeber on Rusty | Spain; Beatriz Ferrer-Salat on Beauvalais; Juan Antonio Jiménez on Guizo; Ignacio Rambla on Oleaje; Rafael Soto on Invasor | United States; Lisa Wilcox on Relevant 5 Günter Seidel on Aragon; Deborah McDonald on Brentina; Robert Dover on Kennedy |
| Individual eventing | Leslie Law on Shear L'Eau; Great Britain | Kimberly Severson on Winsome Andante; United States | Philippa Funnell on Primmore's Pride; Great Britain |
| Team eventing | France; Arnaud Boiteau on Expo du Moulin; Cédric Lyard on Fine Merveille; Didier Courrèges on Débat D'Estruval; Jean Teulère on Espoir de la Mare; Nicolas Touzaint on Galan de Sauvegère | Great Britain; Jeanette Brakewell on Over To You; Mary King on King Solomon III; Leslie Law on Shear L'Eau; Pippa Funnell on Primmore's Pride; William Fox-Pitt on Tamarillo | United States; Kimberly Severson on Winsome Andante; Darren Chiacchia on Windfall II; John Williams on Carrick; Amy Tryon on Poggio II; Julie Richards on Jacob Two Two |
| Individual jumping | Rodrigo Pessoa on Baloubet du Rouet; Brazil | Chris Kappler on Royal Kaliber; United States | Marco Kutscher on Montender 2 Germany |
| Team jumping | United States; Peter Wylde on Fein Cera; McLain Ward on Sapphire; Beezie Madden on Authentic; Chris Kappler on Royal Kaliber | Sweden; Rolf-Göran Bengtsson on Mac Kinley; Malin Baryard on Butterfly Flip; Peter Eriksson on Cardento; Peder Fredericson on Magic Bengtsson | Germany; Otto Becker on Cento; Marco Kutscher on Montender 2 Christian Ahlmann on Cöster |

== Schedule ==
Equestrian events took place over 14 days, from 14 August to 27 August. Eventing was held on the first five days, while the other two disciplines overlapped for most of the rest of the schedule.

1. 14 August
  - Eventing - first horse inspection
2. 15 August
  - Eventing - dressage
3. 16 August
  - Eventing - dressage
4. 17 August
  - Eventing - cross country
5. 18 August
  - Eventing - second horse inspection
  - Eventing - first round of jumping (used for team jumping portion and individual qualification)
  - Eventing - individual jumping final
6. 19 August
  - Dressage - horse inspection
  - Jumping - training
7. 20 August
  - Dressage - grand prix
  - Jumping - first horse inspection
8. 21 August
  - Dressage - grand prix
9. 22 August
  - Jumping - first qualifier
10. 23 August
  - Dressage - grand prix special
11. 24 August
  - Jumping - second qualifier (first team round)
  - Jumping - third qualifier (second team round)
  - Jumping - team jump-off
12. 25 August
  - Dressage - grand prix freestyle
13. 26 August
  - Jumping - second horse inspection
14. 27 August
  - Jumping - final round A
  - Jumping - final round B
  - Jumping - jump-off

== Officials ==
Appointment of officials was as follows:

Dressage

- (Belgium) Mariëtte Withages (Ground Jury President)
- (Italy) Vincenzo Truppa (Ground Jury Member)
- (Netherlands) Francis Verbeek-van Rooy (Ground Jury Member)
- (Poland) Wojktek Markowski (Ground Jury Member)
- (Germany) Dieter Schüle (Ground Jury Member)
- (Switzerland) Beatrice Bürchler-Keller (Ground Jury Member)
- (United Kingdom) Stephen Clarke (Ground Jury Member)

Jumping

- (Sweden) Sven Holmberg (Ground Jury President)
- (Spain) José Alvarez de Bohorques (Ground Jury Member)
- (Canada) Francois Ferland (Ground Jury Member)
- (Greece) Leonidas Georgopoulos (Ground Jury Member)
- (Germany) Olaf Petersen (Course Designer)
- (Venezuela) Leopoldo Palacios (Technical Delegate)

Eventing

- (Germany) Christoph Hess (Ground Jury President)
- (United Kingdom) Angela Tucker (Ground Jury Member)
- (Canada) Cara Whitham (Ground Jury Member)
- (Italy) Albino Garbari (Course Designer)
- (United Kingdom) Michael Etherington-Smith (Technical Delegate)
