= Equestrian at the 2008 Summer Olympics – Individual jumping =

Individual jumping at the Games of the XXIX Olympiad
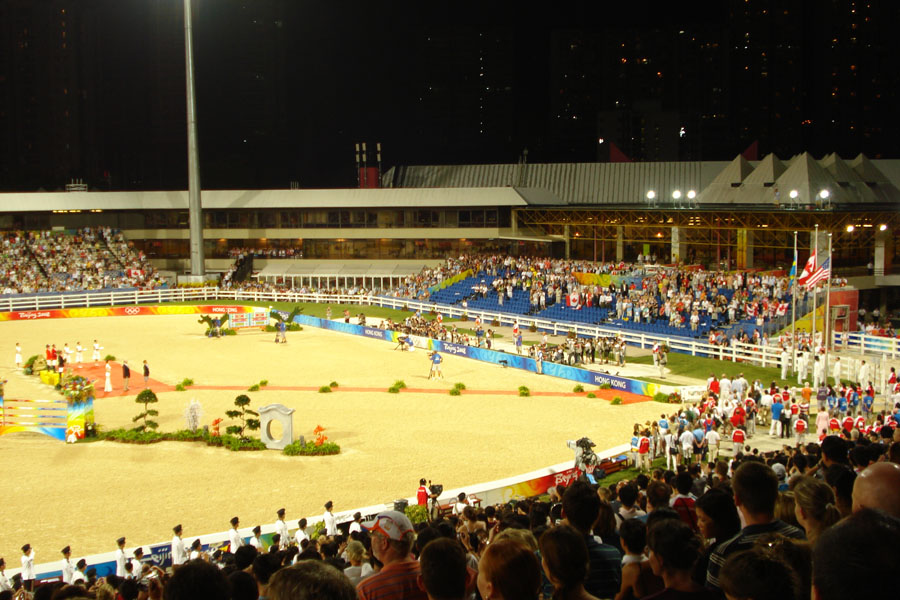
- Medal ceremony
- Venue: Hong Kong Sports Institute
- Dates: 15–21 August
- Competitors: 77 from 29 nations
- Winning total: 0 faults

Medalists
1st place, gold medalist(s)		Eric Lamaze; Canada
2nd place, silver medalist(s)		Rolf-Göran Bengtsson; Sweden
3rd place, bronze medalist(s)		Beezie Madden; United States

The individual show jumping at the 2008 Summer Olympics took place between 15 and 21 August, at the Hong Kong Sports Institute. Like all other equestrian events, the jumping competition was mixed gender, with both male and female athletes competing in the same division. There were 77 competitors from 29 nations. The event was won by Eric Lamaze of Canada, the nation's first victory in individual jumping and first medal of any color in the event since 1976. Silver went to Rolf-Göran Bengtsson of Sweden, that nation's first medal in individual jumping since 1932. American Beezie Madden, who had led through the three qualifying rounds in 2004 before a bad first final round put her in 30th overall in Athens, took the bronze medal in Beijing.

== Background ==
This was the 23rd appearance of the event, which had first been held at the 1900 Summer Olympics and has been held at every Summer Olympics at which equestrian sports have been featured (that is, excluding 1896, 1904, and 1908). It is the oldest event on the current programme, the only one that was held in 1900.

Four of the top 11 riders (including ties for 10th place) from the 2004 Games returned: gold medalist Rodrigo Pessoa of Brazil, bronze medalist Marco Kutscher of Germany, fourth-place finisher Rolf-Göran Bengtsson of Sweden, and tenth-place finisher Nick Skelton of Great Britain. 1992 Olympic gold medalist Ludger Beerbaum of Germany also returned yet again. Jos Lansink of Belgium, a perennial Olympian like Beerbaum, was the reigning World Champion.

Azerbaijan, Bermuda, the People's Republic of China, Hong Kong, Ukraine, and the United Arab Emirates each made their debut in the event. The United States competed for the 20th time, matching absent France for most of any nation.

Four horses were banned from competing for doping, Bernardo Alves of Brazil, Christian Ahlmann of Germany, Denis Lynch of Ireland and Tony Andre Hansen of Norway.

== Qualification ==
Each National Olympic Committee (NOC) could qualify up to 4 horse and rider pairs; there were a total of 79 quota places. Each of the 16 nations qualified for the team jumping could enter 4 pairs in the individual event. The qualified teams were:

- Hosts China and Hong Kong
- 5 teams from the World Equestrian Games: the Netherlands, the United States, Germany, Ukraine, and Switzerland
- 3 teams from the European Jumping Championship: Great Britain, Sweden, and Norway
- 3 teams from the Pan American Games: Brazil, Canada, and Mexico
- 1 team each from regional groups F and G at the World Games: Saudi Arabia and Australia
- 1 team from the group G qualification event: New Zealand

There were also 15 individual qualification places, with NOCs not earning team spots able to earn up to 2 individual spots. All of these places were assigned by regional groups:

- Groups A and B had two spots, assigned through rankings
- Group C had three spots, assigned through rankings
- Group D had one spot and Group E had 4 spots, assigned through the Pan American Games
- Group F had three spots, two assigned through the World Games and one through a qualification event
- Group G had two spots, one assigned through the World Games and one through a qualification event

== Competition format ==
The competition used the five-round format introduced in 1992, with three rounds in the qualifying round and two rounds in the final. The first three rounds made up the qualifying stage. The second and third of those rounds were also used for the team jumping event. Following the qualifying rounds, the top 35 pairs moved on to the final stage. That stage was held over two rounds; only the top 20 pairs competed in the second of the two final rounds. Overall scores and final rankings were based on the sum of scores from both rounds of the final stage.

== Schedule ==
All times were China Standard Time (UTC+8)

Date	Time	Round
Friday, 15 August 2008	19:15	Qualifying round 1
Sunday, 17 August 2008	19:15	Qualifying round 2
Monday, 18 August 2008	19:15	Qualifying round 3
Thursday, 21 August 2008	19:15; 22:10	Final round A Final round B

== Results ==
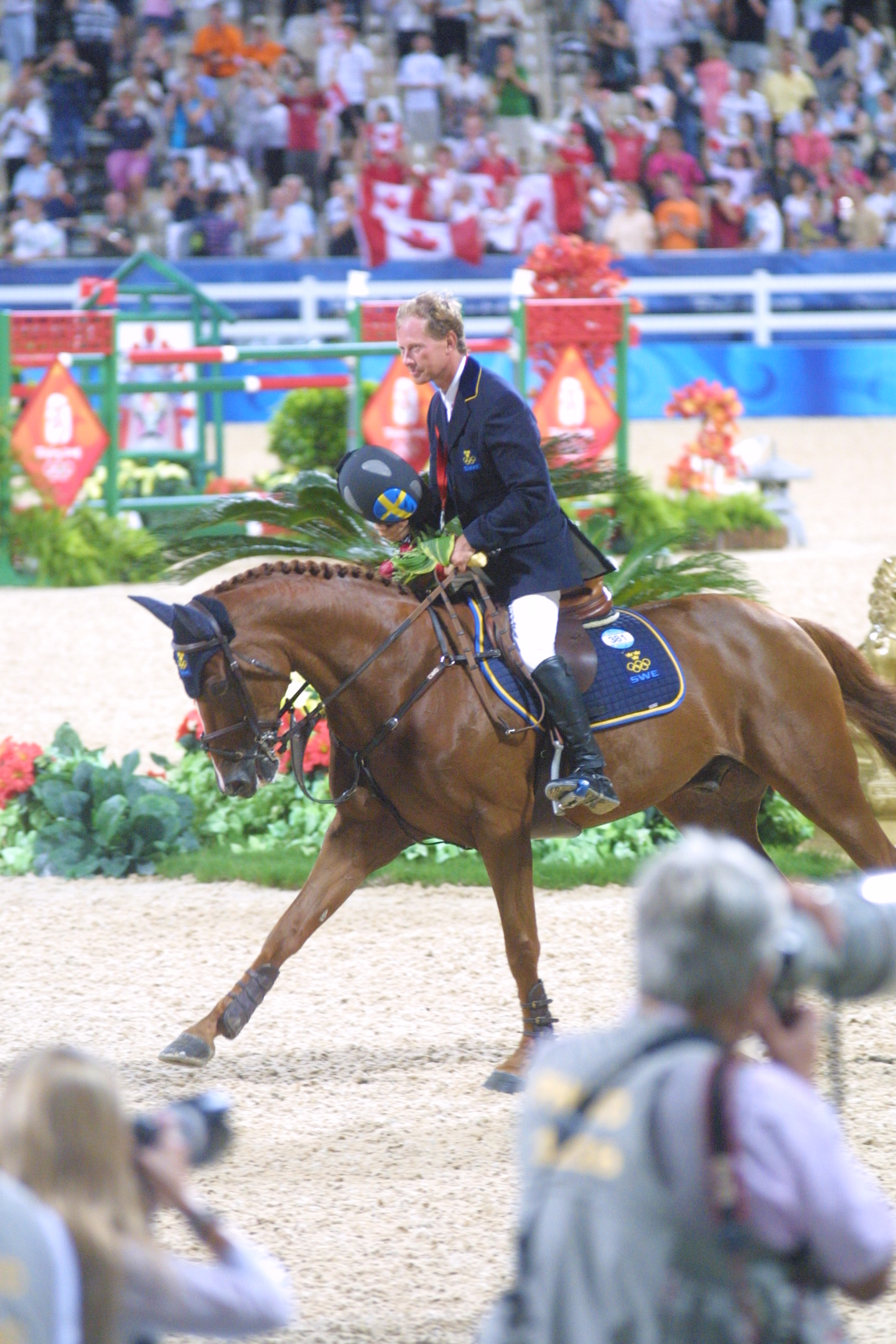
Rolf-Göran Bengtsson and Ninja La Silla

=== Qualifying round ===
==== Round 1 ====
Rank	Rider	Nation	Horse	Penalties		
Rank	Rider	Nation	Horse	Jump	Time	Total
1	Christina Liebherr	Switzerland	No Mercy	0	0	0
1	Pedro Veniss	Brazil	Un Blanc de Blancs	0	0	0
1	Taizo Sugitani	Japan	California	0	0	0
1	Mac Cone	Canada	Ole	0	0	0
1	Stein Endresen	Norway	Le Beau	0	0	0
1	McLain Ward	United States	Sapphire	0	0	0
1	Patrick Lam	Hong Kong	Urban	0	0	0
1	Bernardo Alves	Brazil	Chupa Chup	0	0	0
1	Vincent Voorn	Netherlands	Alpapillon-Armanie	0	0	0
1	Niklaus Schurtenberger	Switzerland	Cantus	0	0	0
1	Eric Lamaze	Canada	Hickstead	0	0	0
1	Will Simpson	United States	Carlsson vom Dach	0	0	0
1	Beezie Madden	United States	Authentic	0	0	0
14	Nick Skelton	Great Britain	Russel	0	1	1
14	Laurie Lever	Australia	Drossel Dan	0	1	1
14	Jill Henselwood	Canada	Special Ed	0	1	1
14	Morten Djupvik	Norway	Casino	0	1	1
14	Antonio Chedraui	Mexico	Don Porfirio	0	1	1
14	Jamal Rahimov	Azerbaijan	Ionesco de Brekka	0	1	1
14	Eiken Sato	Japan	Cayak	0	1	1
14	Ben Maher	Great Britain	Rolette	0	1	1
14	Denis Lynch	Ireland	Lantinus	0	1	1
14	Steve Guerdat	Switzerland	Jalisca Solier	0	1	1
14	Jos Lansink	Belgium	Cumano	0	1	1
14	Tony Andre Hansen	Norway	Camiro	0	1	1
14	Federico Fernandez	Mexico	Zorro	0	1	1
27	Marc Houtzager	Netherlands	Opium	0	2	2
27	Ramzy Al Duhami	Saudi Arabia	Allah Jabek	0	2	2
29	Angelique Hoorn	Netherlands	O'Brien	4	0	4
29	Peter McMahon	Australia	Genoa	4	0	4
29	Tim Stockdale	Great Britain	Corlato	4	0	4
29	Pius Schwizer	Switzerland	Nobless M	4	0	4
29	Kirk Webby	New Zealand	Sitah	4	0	4
29	Edwina Alexander	Australia	Itot du Chateau	4	0	4
29	Matt Williams	Australia	Leconte	4	0	4
29	Ian Millar	Canada	In Style	4	0	4
29	Rolf-Göran Bengtsson	Sweden	Ninja	4	0	4
38	Jean-Claude Van Geenberghe	Ukraine	Quintus	4	1	5
38	Laura Kraut	United States	Cedric	4	1	5
38	Lotta Schultz	Sweden	Calibra II	4	1	5
38	Camila Benedicto	Brazil	Bonito Z	4	1	5
38	Gerco Schröder	Netherlands	Monaco	4	1	5
38	John Whitaker	Great Britain	Peppermill	4	1	5
38	Jillian Terceira	Bermuda	Chaka III	4	1	5
45	Marco Kutscher	Germany	Cornet Obolensky	4	2	6
45	Meredith Michaels-Beerbaum	Germany	Shutterfly	4	2	6
45	Kenneth Cheng	Hong Kong	Can Do	4	2	6
48	Peter Eriksson	Sweden	Jaguar Mail	8	0	8
48	Lyubov Kochetova	Russia	Ilion Kilen	8	0	8
48	Helena Lundback	Sweden	Erbblume	8	0	8
51	Pablo Barrios	Venezuela	Sinatra	8	1	9
51	Juan Andres Rodriguez	Guatemala	Orestus	8	1	9
51	Enrique González	Mexico	Frida	8	1	9
51	Li Zhenqiang	China	Jumpy des Fontaines	4	5	9
55	Christian Ahlmann	Germany	Coster	8	2	10
55	Huang Zuping	China	Pablo II	8	2	10
55	Abdullah Al Saud	Saudi Arabia	Obelix	8	2	10
55	Bjorn Nagel	Ukraine	Magic Bengtsson	8	2	10
55	Ludger Beerbaum	Germany	All Inclusive	8	2	10
60	Faisal Al Shalan	Saudi Arabia	Wido	8	3	11
60	Latifa bint Ahmed Al Maktoum	United Arab Emirates	Kalaska de Semilly	8	3	11
60	Kamal Bahamdan	Saudi Arabia	Rivaal	8	3	11
63	Alberto Michan	Mexico	Chinobampo Lavita	8	4	12
64	Geir Gulliksen	Norway	Cattani	12	1	13
66	Jose Larocca	Argentina	Royal Power	12	2	14
66	Samantha Lam	Hong Kong	Tresor	12	2	14
66	Bruce Goodin	New Zealand	Yamato	12	2	14
68	Zhao Zhiwen	China	Tadonia	16	1	17
69	Oleksandr Onyshchenko	Ukraine	Codar	16	2	18
70	Ibrahim Bisharat	Jordan	Sam-Sam	16	3	19
71	Manuel Torres	Colombia	Chambacunero	20	1	21
72	Katharina Offel	Ukraine	Lord Spezi	20	7	27
73	Zhang Bin	China	Coertis	28	2	30
74	Sharn Wordley	New Zealand	Rockville	44	3	47
75	Karim El Zoghby	Egypt	Aladin	48	4	52
76	Katie McVean	New Zealand	Forest	72	0	72
—	Rodrigo Pessoa	Brazil	Rufus	~~0~~	~~1~~	DPG

==== Round 2 ====
Rank	Rider	Nation	Horse	Penalties				Notes
Rank	Rider	Nation	Horse	Jump	Time	Round 1	Total	Notes
1	McLain Ward	United States	Sapphire	0	0	0	0	Q
1	Eric Lamaze	Canada	Hickstead	0	0	0	0	Q
3	Denis Lynch	Ireland	Lantinus	0	1	1	2	Q
3	Jos Lansink	Belgium	Cumano	0	1	1	2	Q
3	Tony Andre Hansen	Norway	Camiro	0	1	1	2	Q
6	Marc Houtzager	Netherlands	Opium	0	1	2	3	Q
7	Rolf-Göran Bengtsson	Sweden	Ninja	0	0	4	4	Q
7	Stein Endresen	Norway	Le Beau	4	0	0	4	Q
7	Christina Liebherr	Switzerland	No Mercy	4	0	0	4	Q
7	Edwina Alexander	Australia	Itot du Chateau	0	0	4	4	Q
7	Niklaus Schurtenberger	Switzerland	Cantus	4	0	0	4	Q
12	Ben Maher	Great Britain	Rolette	4	0	1	5	Q
12	Steve Guerdat	Switzerland	Jalisca Solier	4	0	1	5	Q
14	Ramzy Al Duhami	Saudi Arabia	Allah Jabek	4	1	2	7	Q
15	Angelique Hoorn	Netherlands	O'Brien	4	0	4	8	Q
15	Tim Stockdale	Great Britain	Corlato	4	0	4	8	Q
15	Pius Schwizer	Switzerland	Nobless M	4	0	4	8	Q
15	Will Simpson	United States	Carlsson vom Dach	8	0	0	8	Q
15	Matt Williams	Australia	Leconte	4	0	4	8	Q
15	Ian Millar	Canada	In Style	4	0	4	8	Q
21	Patrick Lam	Hong Kong	Urban	8	1	0	9	Q
21	Antonio Chedraui	Mexico	Don Porfirio	8	0	1	9	Q
21	Nick Skelton	Great Britain	Russel	8	0	1	9	Q
21	Laura Kraut	United States	Cedric	4	0	5	9	Q
25	Lotta Schultz	Sweden	Calibra II	4	1	5	10	Q
25	Meredith Michaels-Beerbaum	Germany	Shutterfly	4	0	6	10	Q
25	Federico Fernandez	Mexico	Zorro	8	1	1	10	Q
28	Beezie Madden	United States	Authentic	8	3	0	11	Q
29	Kirk Webby	New Zealand	Sitah	8	0	4	12	Q
29	Mac Cone	Canada	Ole	12	0	0	12	Q
29	Bernardo Alves	Brazil	Chupa Chup	12	0	0	12	Q
32	Jean-Claude Van Geenberghe	Ukraine	Quintus	8	0	5	13	Q
32	Morten Djupvik	Norway	Casino	12	0	1	13	Q
34	Peter Eriksson	Sweden	Jaguar Mail	8	0	8	16	Q
34	Vincent Voorn	Netherlands	Alpapillon-Armanie	16	0	0	16	Q
36	Taizo Sugitani	Japan	California	16	1	0	17	Q
36	Laurie Lever	Australia	Drossel Dan	16	0	1	17	Q
36	Gerco Schröder	Netherlands	Monaco	12	0	5	17	Q
39	Juan Andres Rodriguez	Guatemala	Orestus	8	1	9	18	Q
39	Christian Ahlmann	Germany	Coster	8	0	10	18	Q
39	Ludger Beerbaum	Germany	All Inclusive	8	0	10	18	Q
39	Camila Benedicto	Brazil	Bonito Z	12	1	5	18	Q
43	Marco Kutscher	Germany	Cornet Obolensky	12	1	6	19	Q
43	Bjorn Nagel	Ukraine	Magic Bengtsson	8	1	10	19	Q
43	Jill Henselwood	Canada	Special Ed	16	2	1	19	Q
46	Helena Lundback	Sweden	Erbblume	12	0	8	20	Q
46	Peter McMahon	Australia	Genoa	16	0	4	20	Q
48	Alberto Michan	Mexico	Chinobampo Lavita	8	1	12	21	Q
49	Pablo Barrios	Venezuela	Sinatra	12	2	9	23	Q
50	Eiken Sato	Japan	Cayak	24	0	1	25	
50	Enrique Gonzalez	Mexico	Frida	16	0	9	25	
50	Geir Gulliksen	Norway	Cattani	12	0	13	25	
53	Latifa bin Ahmed Al Maktoum	United Arab Emirates	Kalaska de Semilly	12	3	11	26	
53	Kamal Bahamdan	Saudi Arabia	Rivaal	12	3	11	26	
53	Bruce Goodin	New Zealand	Yamato	12	0	14	26	
56	Kenneth Cheng	Hong Kong	Can Do	20	1	6	27	
57	Faisal Al Shalan	Saudi Arabia	Wido	16	2	11	29	
58	Jose Larocca	Argentina	Royal Power	16	0	14	30	
59	Abdullah Al Saud	Saudi Arabia	Obelix	28	2	10	40	
60	Ibrahim Bisharat	Jordan	Sam-Sam	20	32	19	41	
60	Ljubov Kochetova	Russia	Ilion Kilen	28	5	8	41	
62	Manuel Torres	Colombia	Chambacunero	20	2	21	43	
62	Samantha Lam	Hong Kong	Tresor	28	1	14	43	
64	Katharina Offel	Ukraine	Lord Spezi	16	1	27	44	
65	Huang Zuping	China	Pablo II	36	0	10	46	
66	Li Zhenqiang	China	Jumpy des Fontaines	32	7	9	48	
67	Zhao Zhiwen	China	Tadonia	32	0	17	49	
68	Zhang Bin	China	Coertis	24	7	30	61	
69	Sharn Wordley	New Zealand	Rockville	24	1	47	72	
70	Katie McVean	New Zealand	Forest	40	5	72	117	
–	Pedro Veniss	Brazil	Un Blanc de Blancs	Eliminated		0	Elim.	
–	Jamal Rahimov	Azerbaijan	Ionesco de Brekka	Eliminated		1	Elim.	
–	Jillian Terceira	Bermuda	Chaka III	Eliminated		5	Elim.	
–	Oleksandr Onyshchenko	Ukraine	Codar	Eliminated		18	Elim.	
—	John Whitaker	Great Britain	Peppermill	DNS		5	DNF	
—	Karim El Zoghby	Egypt	Aladin	DNS		52	DNF	
—	Rodrigo Pessoa	Brazil	Rufus	~~0~~	~~0~~	~~1~~	~~1~~	Q, DPG

==== Round 3 ====
Rank	Rider	Nation	Horse	Penalties				Notes
Rank	Rider	Nation	Horse	Jump	Time	Round 1+2	Total	Notes
1	Tony Andre Hansen	Norway	Camiro	0	1	2	3	Q
2	Jos Lansink	Belgium	Cumano	0	2	2	4	Q
2	McLain Ward	United States	Sapphire	4	0	0	4	Q
2	Edwina Alexander	Australia	Itot du Chateau	0	0	4	4	Q
2	Eric Lamaze	Canada	Hickstead	4	0	0	4	Q
6	Ben Maher	Great Britain	Rolette	0	0	5	5	Q
7	Denis Lynch	Ireland	Lantinus	4	2	2	8	Q
7	Marc Houtzager	Netherlands	Opium	4	1	3	8	Q
7	Ian Millar	Canada	In Style	0	0	8	8	Q
7	Rolf-Göran Bengtsson	Sweden	Ninja	4	0	4	8	Q
11	Laura Kraut	United States	Cedric	0	0	9	9	Q
12	Steve Guerdat	Switzerland	Jalisca Solier	4	1	5	10	Q
13	Niklaus Schurtenberger	Switzerland	Cantus	8	0	4	12	Q
14	Pius Schwizer	Switzerland	Nobless M	4	1	8	13	Q
15	Meredith Michaels-Beerbaum	Germany	Shutterfly	4	0	10	14	Q
16	Beezie Madden	United States	Authentic	4	0	11	15	Q
17	Ramzy Al Duhami	Saudi Arabia	Allah Jabek	8	1	7	16	Q
17	Angelique Hoorn	Netherlands	O'Brien	8	0	8	16	Q
17	Stein Endresen	Norway	Le Beau	12	0	4	16	Q
17	Tim Stockdale	Great Britain	Corlato	8	0	8	16	Q
17	Will Simpson	United States	Carlsson vom Dach	8	0	8	16	3/NOC
22	Jean-Claude Van Geenberghe	Ukraine	Quintus	4	0	13	17	Q
22	Antonio Chedraui	Mexico	Don Porfirio	8	0	9	17	Q
22	Morten Djupvik	Norway	Casino	4	0	13	17	Q
25	Jill Henselwood	Canada	Special Ed	0	0	19	19	Q
26	Bernardo Alves	Brazil	Chupa Chup	8	0	12	20	Q
26	Peter Eriksson	Sweden	Jaguar Mail	4	0	16	20	Q
28	Laurie Lever	Australia	Drossel Dan	4	0	17	21	Q
28	Gerco Schröder	Netherlands	Monaco	4	0	17	21	Q
30	Christian Ahlmann	Germany	Coster	4	0	18	22	Q
30	Nick Skelton	Great Britain	Russel	12	1	9	22	Q
32	Kirk Webby	New Zealand	Sitah	12	0	12	24	Q
32	Federico Fernandez	Mexico	Zorro	12	2	10	24	Q
32	Ludger Beerbaum	Germany	All Inclusive	4	2	18	24	Q
35	Matt Williams	Australia	Leconte	16	1	8	25	Q
36	Taizo Sugitani	Japan	California	8	1	17	26	
37	Camila Benedicto	Brazil	Bonito Z	8	1	18	27	
37	Christina Liebherr	Switzerland	No Mercy	20	3	4	27	
39	Lotta Schultz	Sweden	Calibra II	20	0	10	30	
40	Juan Andres Rodriguez	Guatemala	Orestus	12	1	18	31	
41	Helena Lundback	Sweden	Erbblume	16	1	20	37	
42	Marco Kutscher	Germany	Cornet Obolensky	16	3	19	38	
43	Pablo Barrios	Venezuela	Sinatra	16	4	23	43	
43	Vincent Voorn	Netherlands	Alpapillon-Armanie	24	3	16	43	
45	Patrick Lam	Hong Kong	Urban	28	8	9	45	
46	Alberto Michan	Mexico	Chinobampo Lavita	24	1	21	46	
—	Mac Cone	Canada	Ole	DNS		12	DNF	
—	Bjorn Nagel	Ukraine	Magic Bengtsson	DNS		19	DNF	
—	Peter McMahon	Australia	Genoa	DNS		20	DNF	
—	Rodrigo Pessoa	Brazil	Rufus	~~4~~	~~2~~	~~1~~	~~7~~	Q, DPG

=== Final round ===
==== Round A ====
Rank	Rider	Nation	Horse	Penalties			Notes
Rank	Rider	Nation	Horse	Jump	Time	Total	Notes
1	Camila Benedicto	Brazil	Bonito Z	0	0	0	Q
1	Angelique Hoorn	Netherlands	O'Brien	0	0	0	Q
1	Stein Endresen	Norway	Le Beau	0	0	0	Q
1	Tim Stockdale	Great Britain	Corlato	0	0	0	Q
1	Beezie Madden	United States	Authentic	0	0	0	Q
1	Marc Houtzager	Netherlands	Opium	0	0	0	Q
1	Rolf-Göran Bengtsson	Sweden	Ninja	0	0	0	Q
1	Ben Maher	Great Britain	Rolette	0	0	0	Q
1	Jos Lansink	Belgium	Cumano	0	0	0	Q
1	Eric Lamaze	Canada	Hickstead	0	0	0	Q
11	Lotta Schultz	Sweden	Calibra II	4	0	4	Q
11	Matt Williams	Australia	Leconte	4	0	4	Q
11	Ludger Beerbaum	Germany	All Inclusive	4	0	4	Q
11	Gerco Schröder	Netherlands	Monaco	4	0	4	Q
11	Jill Henselwood	Canada	Special Ed	4	0	4	Q
11	Jean-Claude Van Geenberghe	Ukraine	Quintus	4	0	4	Q
11	Morten Djupvik	Norway	Casino	4	0	4	Q
11	Meredith Michaels-Beerbaum	Germany	Shutterfly	4	0	4	Q
11	Steve Guerdat	Switzerland	Jalisca Solier	4	0	4	Q
11	McLain Ward	United States	Sapphire	4	0	4	Q
11	Edwina Alexander	Australia	Itot du Chateau	4	0	4	Q
23	Laurie Lever	Australia	Drossel Dan	8	0	8	
23	Ramzy Al Duhami	Saudi Arabia	Allah Jabek	8	0	8	
23	Pius Schwizer	Switzerland	Nobless M	8	0	8	
23	Niklaus Schurtenberger	Switzerland	Cantus	8	0	8	
23	Laura Kraut	United States	Cedric	8	0	8	
23	Ian Millar	Canada	In Style	8	0	8	
28	Alberto Michan	Mexico	Chinobampo Lavita	12	0	12	
28	Taizo Sugitani	Japan	California	12	0	12	
28	Federico Fernandez	Mexico	Zorro	12	0	12	
28	Nick Skelton	Great Britain	Russel	12	0	12	
32	Peter Eriksson	Sweden	Jaguar Mail	16	0	16	
33	Kirk Webby	New Zealand	Sitah	24	0	24	
—	Rodrigo Pessoa	Brazil	Rufus	~~4~~	~~0~~	~~4~~	Q, DPG

==== Round B ====
Rank	Rider	Nation	Horse	Penalties				Notes
Rank	Rider	Nation	Horse	Jump	Time	Round A	Total	Notes
1	Rolf-Göran Bengtsson	Sweden	Ninja	0	0	0	0	Q
1	Eric Lamaze	Canada	Hickstead	0	0	0	0	Q
3	Ludger Beerbaum	Germany	All Inclusive	0	0	4	4	B
3	Meredith Michaels-Beerbaum	Germany	Shutterfly	0	0	4	4	B
3	McLain Ward	United States	Sapphire	0	0	4	4	B
3	Angelique Hoorn	Netherlands	O'Brien	4	0	0	4	B
3	Beezie Madden	United States	Authentic	4	0	0	4	B
3	Marc Houtzager	Netherlands	Opium	4	0	0	4	B
9	Jean-Claude Van Geenberghe	Ukraine	Quintus	4	0	4	8	
9	Morten Djupvik	Norway	Casino	4	0	4	8	
9	Steve Guerdat	Switzerland	Jalisca Solier	4	0	4	8	
9	Edwina Alexander	Australia	Itot du Chateau	4	0	4	8	
9	Camila Benedicto	Brazil	Bonito Z	8	0	0	8	
9	Jos Lansink	Belgium	Cumano	8	0	0	8	
15	Gerco Schröder	Netherlands	Monaco	12	0	4	16	
15	Stein Endresen	Norway	Le Beau	16	0	0	16	
15	Tim Stockdale	Great Britain	Corlato	16	0	0	16	
18	Lotta Schultz	Sweden	Calibra II	12	1	4	17	
19	Ben Maher	Great Britain	Rolette	20	0	0	20	
20	Matt Williams	Australia	Leconte	20	0	4	24	
—	Jill Henselwood	Canada	Special Ed	DNF		4	DNF	
—	Rodrigo Pessoa	Brazil	Rufus	~~4~~	~~0~~	~~4~~	~~8~~	B, DPG

==== Bronze medal jump-off ====
Rank	Rider	Nation	Horse	Penalties	Time (s)
3rd place, bronze medalist(s)	Beezie Madden	United States	Authentic	0	35.25
4	Meredith Michaels-Beerbaum	Germany	Shutterfly	0	35.37
5	McLain Ward	United States	Sapphire	4	35.39
6	Ludger Beerbaum	Germany	All Inclusive	4	36.16
7	Marc Houtzager	Netherlands	Opium	8	36.77
8	Angelique Hoorn	Netherlands	O'Brien	8	36.89
—	Rodrigo Pessoa	Brazil	Rufus	~~0~~	~~37.04~~

==== Gold medal jump-off ====
Rank	Rider	Nation	Horse	Penalties	Time (s)
1st place, gold medalist(s)	Eric Lamaze	Canada	Hickstead	0	38.39
2nd place, silver medalist(s)	Rolf-Göran Bengtsson	Sweden	Ninja	4	38.39
