= Equestrian at the 2008 Summer Olympics – Team jumping =

Team jumping at the Games of the XXIX Olympiad
- Venue: Hong Kong Sports Institute
- Date: 15–18 August

Medalists
1st place, gold medalist(s)		Laura Kraut; Beezie Madden; Will Simpson; McLain Ward	United States
2nd place, silver medalist(s)		Mac Cone; Jill Henselwood; Eric Lamaze; Ian Millar	Canada
3rd place, bronze medalist(s)		Christina Liebherr; Pius Schwizer; Niklaus Schurtenberger; Steve Guerdat	Switzerland

The team jumping at the 2008 Summer Olympics took place from August 15 to 18, at the Hong Kong Sports Institute.

The second and third rounds of show-jumping from the individual jumping event were used to determine scores for the team round. The best three scores from teams having more than three competing pairs were used to determine the team score.

== Medalists ==
Gold:		Silver:		Bronze:	
United States		Canada		Switzerland	
Laura Kraut	Cedric	Mac Cone	Ole	Christina Liebherr	No Mercy
Beezie Madden	Authentic	Jill Henselwood	Special Ed	Pius Schwizer	Nobless M
Will Simpson	Carlsson Vom Dach	Eric Lamaze	Hickstead	Niklaus Schurtenberger	Cantus
McLain Ward	Sapphire	Ian Millar	In Style	Steve Guerdat	Jalisca Solier

== Results ==
The first round of the competition were held on August 17, 2008. The eight highest ranked teams in the first round progressed to the second round, which was held on August 18, 2008.

Rank	Name	Round 1		Round 2		Team Total Penalties	Jump-off			
Rank	Name	Penalties		Penalties		Team Total Penalties	Penalties		Time	
Rank	Name	Individual	Team	Individual	Team	Team Total Penalties	Individual	Team	Individual	Team
1st place, gold medalist(s)	United States; McLain Ward; Laura Kraut; Will Simpson; Beezie Madden	0; 4; 8; ~~11~~	12	4; 0; ~~8~~; 4	8	20	0; 0; 0; ~~DNS~~	0	37.05; 39.86; 38.50	115.41
2nd place, silver medalist(s)	Canada; Mac Cone; Jill Henselwood; Eric Lamaze; Ian Millar	12; ~~18~~; 0; 4	16	~~WD~~; 0; 4; 0	4	20	~~DNS~~; 4; 0; ~~DNS~~	4	40.32; 36.35	76.67
3rd place, bronze medalist(s)	Switzerland; Christina Liebherr; Pius Schwizer; Niklaus Schurtenberger; Steve Guerdat	4; 4; 4; ~~4~~	12	~~23~~; 5; 8; 5	18	30				
=4	Netherlands; Angelique Hoorn; Marc Houtzager; Vincent Voorn; Gerco Schroder	4; 1; ~~16~~; 12	17	8; 5; ~~27~~; 4	17	34				
=4	Germany; Christian Ahlmann; Marco Kutscher; Meredith Michaels-Beerbaum; Ludger Beerbaum	8; ~~13~~; 4; 8	20	4; ~~19~~; 4; 6	14	34				
6	Great Britain; Nick Skelton; Tim Stockdale; Ben Maher; John Whitaker	8; 4; 4; ~~DNS~~	16	13; 8; 0; ~~DNS~~	21	37				
7	Sweden; Peter Eriksson; Lotta Schultz; Helena Lundback; Rolf-Göran Bengtsson	8; 5; ~~12~~; 0	13	4; ~~20~~; 17; 4	25	38				
8	Australia; Peter McMahon; Laurie Lever; Edwina Alexander; Matt Williams	16; ~~16~~; 0; 4	20	~~DNS~~; 4; 0; 17	21	41				
9	Mexico; Alberto Michan; Antonio Chedraui; Enrique Gonzalez; Federico Fernandez	9; 8; ~~16~~; 9	26							
10	Norway; Stein Endresen; Morten Djupvik; Geir Gulliksen; ~~Tony Andre Hansen~~	4; 12; 12; ~~DSQ~~	28	~~12~~; ~~4~~; ~~5~~; ~~DSQ~~	~~21~~					
11	Ukraine; Oleksandr Onyshchenko; Jean-Claude Van Geenberghe; Bjorn Nagel; Katharina Offel	~~EL~~; 8; 9; 17	34							
12	Saudi Arabia; HH F. Al Shalan; Kamal Bahamdan; HRH A. Al Saud; Ramzy Al Duhami	18; 15; ~~30~~; 5	38							
13	New Zealand; Katie McVean; Kirk Webby; Sharn Wordley; Bruce Goodin	~~45~~; 8; 25; 12	45							
14	Hong Kong; Patrick Lam; Samantha Lam; Kenneth Cheng	9; 29; 21	59							
15	China; Huang Zuping; Zhang Bin; Zhao Zhiwen; Li Zhenqiang	36; 31; 32; ~~39~~	99							
EL	Brazil; Pedro Veniss; Bernardo Alves; Camila Benedicto; ~~Rodrigo Pessoa~~	EL; 12; 13; ~~DSQ~~	EL							

== Illegal substance use ==
After Tony André Hansen's horse Camiro tested positive for use of capsaicin, Norway has been stripped of their bronze medals.
