= New Zealand at the 2008 Summer Olympics =

- IOC code: NZL
- NOC: New Zealand Olympic Committee
- Website: www.olympic.org.nz

in Beijing
- Competitors: 182 in 17 sports
- Flag bearers: Mahé Drysdale (opening); Georgina and Caroline Evers-Swindell (closing)
- Medals Ranked 25th: Gold 3 Silver 2 Bronze 4 Total 9

Summer Olympics appearances (overview)
- 1908; 1912; 1920; 1924; 1928; 1932; 1936; 1948; 1952; 1956; 1960; 1964; 1968; 1972; 1976; 1980; 1984; 1988; 1992; 1996; 2000; 2004; 2008; 2012; 2016; 2020; 2024

Other related appearances
- Australasia (1908–1912)

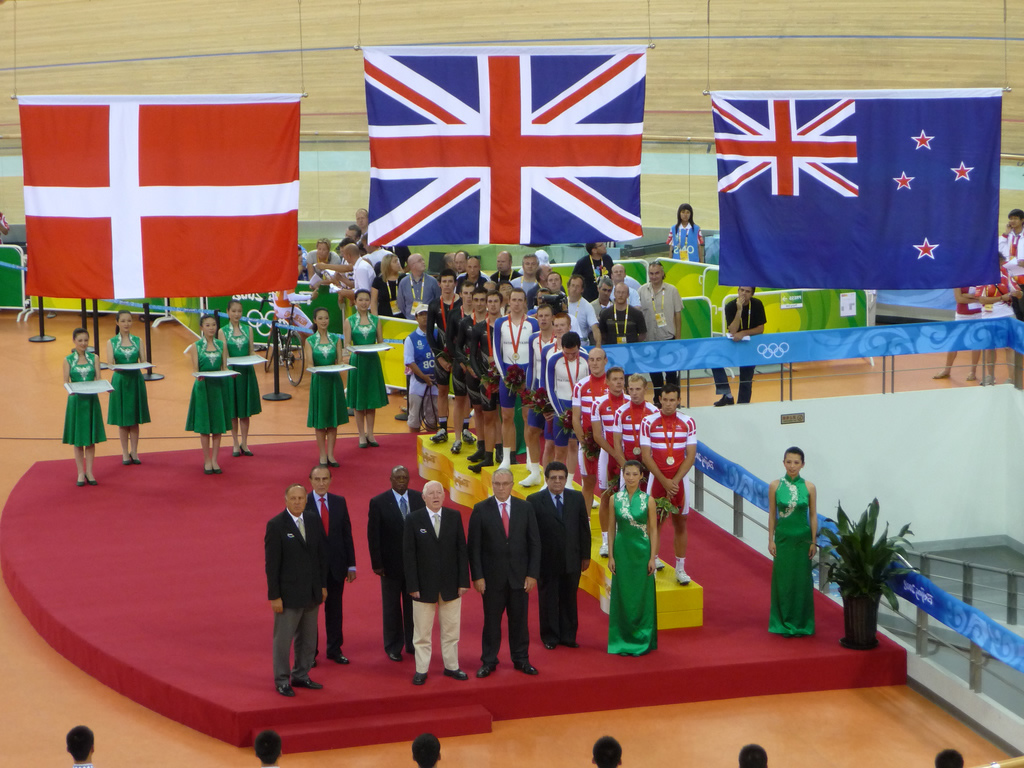
The bronze medal winning New Zealand men's team pursuit cyclists on the podium

New Zealand took part in the 2008 Summer Olympics in Beijing, China. The country sent 182 competitors, making this its largest ever delegation to the Olympic Games. It was also one of the most successful, equalling New Zealand's combined medal tally from the previous two Summer games. On 16 August – dubbed "Super Saturday" by journalists – New Zealand had its greatest single day at any Olympics, winning 5 medals: two gold, one silver and two bronze. New Zealand also gained its first Olympic track medal since 1976 when Nick Willis won the silver medal in the men's 1500 metres, becoming the sixth New Zealander to win an Olympic medal in that event. The success at the Olympics has boosted Athletics participation since then.

== Medallists ==
Medal	Name	Sport	Event
Gold	Georgina Evers-Swindell; Caroline Evers-Swindell	Rowing	Women's double sculls
Gold	Valerie Vili	Athletics	Women's shot put
Gold	Tom Ashley	Sailing	Men's sailboard
Silver	Hayden Roulston	Cycling	Men's individual pursuit
Silver	Nick Willis	Athletics	Men's 1500 m
Bronze	Mahé Drysdale	Rowing	Men's single sculls
Bronze	Nathan Twaddle; George Bridgewater	Rowing	Men's coxless pair
Bronze	Hayden Roulston; Jesse Sergent; Marc Ryan; Sam Bewley	Cycling	Men's team pursuit
Bronze	Bevan Docherty	Triathlon	Men's triathlon

== Delegation ==
New Zealand sent 182 representatives competing in 17 sports. Seventeen-year-old footballer Merissa Smith (born 11 November 1990) was New Zealand's youngest competitor, while 52-year-old equestrian eventer Mark Todd (born 1 March 1956) was the oldest competitor.

The following is the list of number of competitors participating in the Games. Note that reserves in fencing, field hockey, football, and handball are not counted as athletes:

Sport	Men	Women	Total
Athletics	4	6	10
Badminton	2	1	3
Basketball	0	12	12
Canoeing	3	2	5
Cycling	12	5	17
Equestrian	5	4	9
Field hockey	16	16	32
Football	18	18	36
Rowing	11	5	16
Sailing	7	2	9
Shooting	3	1	4
Swimming	9	6	15
Synchronized swimming	0	2	2
Taekwondo	2	1	3
Tennis	0	1	1
Triathlon	3	3	6
Weightlifting	2	0	2
Total	97	85	182

== Athletics ==
Men
Track & road events

Athlete	Event	Heat		Quarterfinal		Semifinal		Final	
Athlete	Event	Result	Rank	Result	Rank	Result	Rank	Result	Rank
Adrian Blincoe	5000 m	13:55.27	7	—				Did not advance	
James Dolphin	200 m	20.98	6	Did not advance					
Nick Willis	800 m	DNS		—		Did not advance			
Nick Willis	1500 m	3:36.01	2 Q	—		3:37.54	5 Q	3:34.16	2nd place, silver medalist(s)

Field events

Athlete	Event	Qualification		Final	
Athlete	Event	Distance	Position	Distance	Position
Stuart Farquhar	Javelin throw	76.14	20	Did not advance	

Women
Track & road events

Athlete	Event	Final	
Athlete	Event	Result	Rank
Liza Hunter-Galvan	Marathon	2:34:51	35
Nina Rillstone	Marathon	2:31:16	16
Kimberley Smith	10000 m	30:51.00	9

Field events

Athlete	Event	Qualification		Final	
Athlete	Event	Distance	Position	Distance	Position
Beatrice Faumuina	Discus throw	57.15	28	Did not advance	
Valerie Vili	Shot put	19.73	1 Q	20.56	1st place, gold medalist(s)

Combined events – Heptathlon

Athlete	Event	100H	HJ	SP	200 m	LJ	JT	800 m	Final	Rank
Rebecca Wardell	Result	14.07	1.71	14.28	24.64	5.84	42.14	2:13.65	5989	22*
Rebecca Wardell	Points	968	867	813	920	801	708	912	5989	22*

* The athlete who finished in second place, Lyudmila Blonska of Ukraine, tested positive for a banned substance. Both the A and the B tests were positive, therefore Blonska was stripped of her silver medal, and Wardell moved up a position.

Key

- Note–Ranks given for track events are within the athlete's heat only
- Q = Qualified for the next round
- q = Qualified for the next round as a fastest loser or, in field events, by position without achieving the qualifying target
- NR = National record
- N/A = Round not applicable for the event
- Bye = Athlete not required to compete in round

== Badminton ==
Athlete	Event	Round of 64	Round of 32	Round of 16	Quarterfinal	Semifinal	Final / BM	
Athlete	Event	Opposition Score	Opposition Score	Opposition Score	Opposition Score	Opposition Score	Opposition Score	Rank
John Moody	Men's singles	Bye	Chen J (CHN); L 9–21, 11–21	Did not advance				
Craig Cooper; Renee Flavell	Mixed doubles	—		Lee H-j / Lee Y-d (KOR); L 12–21, 11–21	Did not advance			

== Basketball ==
=== Women's tournament ===
Roster

The following is the New Zealand roster in the women's basketball tournament of the 2008 Summer Olympics.

New Zealand women's national basketball team – 2008 Summer Olympics roster
Players
Coaches

Pos.	No.	Name	Age – Date of birth	Height	Club	Ctr.
F	4	Charmian Purcell	29 – January 7, 1979	5 ft 11 in (1.8 m)	Christchurch Sirens	(New Zealand)
G	5	Noni Wharemate	26 – January 17, 1982	5 ft 7 in (1.7 m)	Christchurch Sirens	(New Zealand)
G	6	Angela Marino	22 – February 3, 1986	5 ft 5 in (1.65 m)	Adelaide Lightning	(Australia)
G	7	Micaela Cocks	22 – May 2, 1986	5 ft 8 in (1.73 m)	Oregon Ducks	(United States)
F	8	Natalie Taylor	25 – December 24, 1982	6 ft 0 in (1.83 m)	Christchurch Sirens	(New Zealand)
G	9	Suzie Bates	20 – September 16, 1987	5 ft 8 in (1.73 m)	Christchurch Sirens	(New Zealand)
F	10	Lisa Wallbutton	22 – January 14, 1986	6 ft 0 in (1.83 m)	Christchurch Sirens	(New Zealand)
G	11	Kate McMeeken-Ruscoe	28 – November 19, 1979	5 ft 8 in (1.73 m)	Christchurch Sirens	(New Zealand)
C	12	Jessica McCormack	18 – September 8, 1989	6 ft 4 in (1.93 m)	Connecticut Huskies	(United States)
G	13	Clare Bodensteiner	23 – October 11, 1984	5 ft 9 in (1.75 m)	Stanford Cardinal	(United States)
F	14	Jillian Harmon	21 – March 3, 1987	6 ft 1 in (1.85 m)	Stanford Cardinal	(United States)
F	15	Aneka Kerr (C)	27 – March 1, 1981	6 ft 0 in (1.83 m)	Christchurch Sirens	(New Zealand)

Head coach

- (Australia) Mike McHugh

Assistant coach(es)

- (Australia) Leigh Gooding

Legend

- (C) Team captain
- Club – describes last
  club before the tournament
- Age – describes age
  on August 9, 2008

Group play

Pos	Team	Pld	W	L	PF	PA	PD	Pts	Qualification
1	United States	5	5	0	491	276	+215	10	Quarterfinals
2	China (H)	5	4	1	358	346	+12	9	Quarterfinals
3	Spain	5	3	2	357	324	+33	8	Quarterfinals
4	Czech Republic	5	2	3	346	356	−10	7	Quarterfinals
5	New Zealand	5	1	4	320	423	−103	6	
6	Mali	5	0	5	255	402	−147	5	

Source: FIBA archive
Rules for classification: 1) points; 2) head-to-head points; 3) head-to-head points difference; 4) head-to-head number of points scored.
(H) Hosts

9 August 2008
11:15

Report

Mali	72–76	New Zealand
Scoring by quarter: 18–18, 15–24, 21–18, 18–16
Pts: Maïga 18; Rebs: Coulibaly 12; Asts: Maïga 3		Pts: Marino 19; Rebs: Harmon 8 Asts: Marino 4

Wukesong Indoor Stadium, Beijing
Attendance: 11,083
Referees: Stephen Seibel (CAN)

11 August 2008
09:00

Report

New Zealand	62–85	Spain
Scoring by quarter: 7–18, 20–22, 20–20, 15–25
Pts: Harmon 22; Rebs: Wallbutton 6 Asts: Harmon 3		Pts: Sanchez 19; Rebs: Montañana 7 Asts: Aguilar, Sánchez, Torrens 2

Wukesong Indoor Stadium, Beijing
Attendance: 11,083
Referees: Abreu Muhimua (MOZ)

13 August 2008
16:45

Report

China	80–63	New Zealand
Scoring by quarter: 26–18, 24–13, 15–17, 15–15
Pts: Chen 26; Rebs: Chen 17; Asts: Miao 6		Pts: Harmon, Marino 14; Rebs: Harmon 8 Asts: Bates 4

Wukesong Indoor Stadium, Beijing
Attendance: 11,083
Referees: Yuji Hirahara (JPN)

15 August 2008
09:00

Report

Czech Republic	90–59	New Zealand
Scoring by quarter: 26–12, 18–19, 21–7, 25–21
Pts: Machová 23; Rebs: Vesela 10; Asts: Vesela 5		Pts: Marino 22; Rebs: Wallbutton 10; Asts: Bates 5

Wukesong Indoor Stadium, Beijing
Attendance: 11,083
Referees: Chantal Julien (FRA)

17 August 2008
22:15

Report

New Zealand	60–96	United States
Scoring by quarter: 18–23, 6–27, 18–25, 18–21
Pts: Marino 17; Rebs: Harmon 7 Asts: Marino 17		Pts: Thompson 15; Rebs: Leslie, Fowles 6 Asts: Taurasi 5

Wukesong Indoor Stadium, Beijing
Attendance: 11,083
Referees: Luigi Lamonica (ITA)

== Canoeing ==
=== Slalom ===
Athlete	Event	Preliminary						Semifinal		Final			
Athlete	Event	Run 1	Rank	Run 2	Rank	Total	Rank	Time	Rank	Time	Rank	Total	Rank
Luuka Jones	Women's K-1	162.35	20	110.01	16	272.36	21	Did not advance					

=== Sprint ===
Athlete	Event	Heats		Semifinals		Final	
Athlete	Event	Time	Rank	Time	Rank	Time	Rank
Ben Fouhy	Men's K-1 1000 m	3:33.037	3 QS	3:33.542	2 Q	3:29.193	4
Steven Ferguson	Men's K-1 500 m	1:37.538	4 QS	1:42.238	1 Q	1:38.512	8
Steven Ferguson; Mike Walker	Men's K-2 1000 m	3:19.167	4 QS	3:23.511	2 Q	3:15.329	5
Erin Taylor	Women's K-1 500 m	1:52.517	6 QS	1:54.300	5	Did not advance	

Qualification Legend: QS = Qualify to semi-final; QF = Qualify directly to final

== Cycling ==
=== Road ===
Athlete	Event	Time	Rank
Glen Chadwick	Men's road race	6:39:42	91
Julian Dean	Men's road race	6:34:06	54
Timothy Gudsell	Men's road race	Did not finish	
Catherine Cheatley	Women's road race	3:41:08	53
Jo Kiesanowski	Women's road race	3:33:17	28

=== Track ===
Pursuit

Athlete	Event	Qualification		Semifinals		Final	
Athlete	Event	Time	Rank	Opponent Results	Rank	Opponent Results	Rank
Hayden Roulston	Men's individual pursuit	4:18.997	2 Q	Phinney (USA); 4:19:232	2 Q	Wiggins (GBR); 4:19:611	2nd place, silver medalist(s)
Alison Shanks	Women's individual pursuit	3:34.312	4 Q	Hammer (USA); 3:32.478	4 Q	Kalytovska (UKR); 3:34.156	4
Sam Bewley; Westley Gough; Hayden Roulston; Marc Ryan; Jesse Sergent	Men's team pursuit	3:59.277	2 Q	Spain; 3:57.536	3 Q	Australia; 3:57.776	3rd place, bronze medalist(s)

Omnium

Athlete	Event	Points	Laps	Rank
Greg Henderson	Men's points race	13	0	10
Catherine Cheatley	Women's points race	0	0	17
Greg Henderson; Hayden Roulston	Men's madison	5	−1	10

=== Mountain biking ===
Athlete	Event	Time	Rank
Kashi Leuchs	Men's cross-country	2:06:30	24
Rosara Joseph	Women's cross-country	1:51:07	9

=== BMX ===
Athlete	Event	Seeding		Quarterfinals		Semifinals		Final	
Athlete	Event	Result	Rank	Points	Rank	Points	Rank	Result	Rank
Marc Willers	Men's BMX	36.519	17	9	2 Q	23	8	Did not advance	
Sarah Walker	Women's BMX	37.187	4	—		6	2 Q	38.805	4

== Equestrian ==
=== Eventing ===
Athlete	Horse	Event	Dressage		Cross-country			Jumping						Total	
Athlete	Horse	Event	Dressage		Cross-country			Qualifier			Final			Total	
Athlete	Horse	Event	Penalties	Rank	Penalties	Total	Rank	Penalties	Total	Rank	Penalties	Total	Rank	Penalties	Rank
Joe Meyer	Snip	Individual	43.90	19	21.20	65.10	19	25.00	90.10	28 Q	12.00	102.10	24	102.10	24
Andrew Nicholson	Lord Killinghurst	Individual	44.60	21	Eliminated			Did not advance							
Caroline Powell	Lenamore	Individual	48.00	26	21.20	69.20	26	4.00	73.20	19 Q	0.00	73.20	14	73.20	14
Mark Todd	Gandalf	Individual	49.40 #	30	27.20	76.60	29	1.00	77.60	21 Q	0.00	77.60	17	77.60	17
Heelan Tompkins	Sugoi	Individual	55.60 #	49	75.20	130.80 #	56	8.00	138.80 #	=48	Did not advance			138.80	50
Joe Meyer; Andrew Nicholson; Caroline Powell; Mark Todd; Heelan Tompkins	See above	Team	136.50	6	94.40	230.90	6	10.00	240.90	5	—			240.90	5

# – Indicates that points do not count in team total

=== Show jumping ===
Athlete	Horse	Event	Qualification								Final					Total	
Athlete	Horse	Event	Round 1		Round 2			Round 3			Round A		Round B			Total	
Athlete	Horse	Event	Penalties	Rank	Penalties	Total	Rank	Penalties	Total	Rank	Penalties	Rank	Penalties	Total	Rank	Penalties	Rank
Bruce Goodin	Yamato	Individual	14	66	12	26	54	Did not advance								26	54
Katie McVean	Forest	Individual	72	77	45	117	71	Did not advance								117	71
Kirk Webby	Sitah	Individual	4	30	8	12	30 Q	12	24	33 Q	24	34	Did not advance			24	34
Sharn Wordley	Rockville	Individual	47	75	25	72	70	Did not advance								72	70
Bruce Goodin; Katie McVean; Kirk Webby; Sharn Wordley	See above	Team	—								45	14	Did not advance			45	13

== Field hockey ==
=== Men's tournament ===
Team roster

The following is the New Zealand roster in the men's field hockey tournament of the 2008 Summer Olympics.

Head Coach: Shane McLeod

3. David Kosoof
6. Simon Child
7. Blair Hopping
8. Dean Couzins
9. Casey Henwood
10. Ryan Archibald (c)
12. Bradley Shaw
16. Paul Woolford (GK)
17. Kyle Pontifex (GK)
18. Phil Burrows
19. Hayden Shaw
20. James Nation
24. Gareth Brooks
25. Shea McAleese
30. Benjamin Collier
31. Steve Edwards

Reserve:

28. Richard Petherick
32. Nick Wilson

Group play

Pos	Team	Pld	W	D	L	GF	GA	GD	Pts	Qualification
1	Spain	5	4	0	1	9	5	+4	12	Semi-finals
2	Germany	5	3	2	0	12	6	+6	11	Semi-finals
3	South Korea	5	2	1	2	13	11	+2	7	Fifth place game
4	New Zealand	5	2	1	2	10	9	+1	7	Seventh place game
5	Belgium	5	1	1	3	9	13	−4	4	Ninth place game
6	China (H)	5	0	1	4	7	16	−9	1	Eleventh place game

(H) Hosts

11 August 2008
18:00

South Korea	1–3	New Zealand
Lee Nam-yong 12'	Report	H. Shaw 43', 57', 64'

Umpires:
David Gentles (AUS)
Andy Mair (GBR)

13 August 2008
20:30

New Zealand	0–1	Spain
	Report	Freixa 70'

Umpires:
John Wright (RSA)
Christian Blasch (GER)

15 August 2008
18:00

Belgium	2–4	New Zealand
Dekeyser 43'; Gucassoff 69'	Report	Child 19', 20'; Brooks 30'; McAleese 60'

Umpires:
David Leiper (GBR)
Xavier Adell (ESP)

17 August 2008
18:30

New Zealand	2–2	China
Child 34'; McAleese 54'	Report	Song Yi 3', 17'

Umpires:
Murray Grime (AUS)
Andy Mair (GBR)

19 August 2008
10:30

Germany	3–1	New Zealand
T. Weß 5'; Witthaus 9'; Keller 55'	Report	H. Shaw 46'

Umpires:
David Gentles (AUS)
Andy Mair (GBR)

Classification match for 7th/8th place

21 August 2008
11:00

New Zealand	4–2	Pakistan
Child 26'; H. Shaw 39', 53'; Brooks 43'	Report	Bilgrami 46'; Butt 56'

Umpires:
Kim Hong-lae (KOR)
Gary Simmonds (RSA)

=== Women's tournament ===
Team roster

The following is the New Zealand roster in the women's field hockey tournament of the 2008 Summer Olympics.

Head Coach: Kevin Towns

1. Kayla Sharland
2. Emily Naylor
3. Krystal Forgesson
4. Kate Saunders
8. Jaimee Claxton
10. Lizzy Igasan (c)
11. Stacey Carr
13. Jo Galletly
14. Kim Noakes
15. Beth Jurgeleit (GK)
17. Caryn Paewai
21. Niniwa Roberts
22. Gemma Flynn
23. Tara Drysdale
24. Sheree Horvath
26. Anita Wawatai (GK)

Reserve:

28. Charlotte Harrison
29. Jasmine McQuinn

Group play

Team	Pld	W	D	L	GF	GA	GD	Pts	Qualification
Germany	5	4	0	1	12	8	+4	12	Advanced to semifinals
Argentina	5	3	2	0	13	7	+6	11	Advanced to semifinals
Great Britain	5	2	2	1	7	9	−2	8	
United States	5	1	3	1	9	8	+1	6	
Japan	5	1	1	3	5	7	−2	4	
New Zealand	5	0	0	5	6	13	−7	0	

10 August 2008
08:30

Japan	2–1	New Zealand
Morimoto 12'; Tsukui 17'	Report	Claxton 25'

Umpires:
Lee Keum-ju (KOR)
Minka Woolley (AUS)

12 August 2008
21:00

Germany	2–1	New Zealand
Scholz 59'; Kühn 69'	Report	Forgesson 31'

Umpires:
Anne McRae (GBR)
Soledad Iparruguirre (ARG)

14 August 2008
21:00

New Zealand	1–2	Great Britain
Flynn 28'	Report	Danson 31'; Cullen 50'

Umpires:
Julie Ashton-Lucy (AUS)
Carolina de la Fuente (ARG)

16 August 2008
08:30

New Zealand	1–4	United States
Galletly 37'	Report	Smith 1', 42'; Loy 12'; Bashore 47'

Umpires:
Stella Bartlema (NED)
Anne McRae (GBR)

18 August 2008
20:30

Argentina	3–2	New Zealand
Rebecchi 15'; García 43'; Hernández 46'	Report	Roberts 33'; Igasan 61'

Umpires:
Gina Spitaleri (ITA)
Marelize de Klerk (RSA)

Classification match for 11th/12th place

22 August 2008
08:30

South Africa	4–1	New Zealand
Marescia 14'; Wilson 34'; Vida Ryan 51'; Brown 59'	Report	Flynn 17'

Umpires:
Lee Keum-ju (KOR)
Carol Metchette (IRL)

== Football ==
=== Men's tournament ===
Roster

The following is the New Zealand squad in the men's football tournament of the 2008 Summer Olympics.

Head coach: Stu Jacobs

No.	Pos.	Player	Date of birth (age)	Caps	Goals	Club
1	GK	Jacob Spoonley	3 March 1987 (aged 21)	0	0	(New Zealand Football) Wellington Phoenix
2	DF	Aaron Scott	18 July 1986 (aged 22)	0	0	(New Zealand Football) Waikato FC
3	DF	Ian Hogg	15 December 1989 (aged 18)	0	0	(New Zealand Football) Hawke's Bay United
4	MF	Cole Peverley	3 July 1988 (aged 20)	0	0	(New Zealand Football) Hawke's Bay United
5	DF	Ryan Nelsen* (c)	18 October 1977 (aged 30)	32	6	(The Football Association) Blackburn Rovers
6	DF	Michael Boxall	18 August 1988 (aged 19)	0	0	(United States Soccer Federation) UC Santa Barbara
7	MF	Simon Elliott*	10 June 1974 (aged 34)	48	6	(The Football Association) Fulham
8	FW	Craig Henderson	24 June 1987 (aged 21)	0	0	(United States Soccer Federation) Dartmouth College
9	FW	Daniel Ellensohn	9 August 1985 (aged 22)	1	0	(New Zealand Football) Team Wellington
10	FW	Chris Killen*	8 October 1981 (aged 26)	21	8	(Scottish Football Association) Celtic
11	MF	Jeremy Brockie	7 October 1987 (aged 20)	7	0	(New Zealand Football) Hawke's Bay United
12	DF	Steven Old	17 February 1986 (aged 22)	14	1	(Football Australia) Macarthur Rams
13	MF	Shaun van Rooyen	27 April 1987 (aged 21)	0	0	(New Zealand Football) Waikato FC
14	DF	Cole Tinkler	5 May 1986 (aged 22)	0	0	(New Zealand Football) Team Wellington
15	FW	Greg Draper	13 August 1989 (aged 18)	0	0	(New Zealand Football) Wellington Phoenix
16	DF	Sam Jenkins	17 February 1987 (aged 21)	0	0	(New Zealand Football) Hawke's Bay United
17	FW	Sam Messam	2 March 1986 (aged 22)	0	0	(New Zealand Football) Hawke's Bay United
18	GK	Liam Little	27 July 1986 (aged 22)	0	0	(New Zealand Football) Otago United

* Over-aged player.

Group play

Pos	Team	Pld	W	D	L	GF	GA	GD	Pts	Qualification
1	Brazil	3	3	0	0	9	0	+9	9	Qualified for the quarterfinals
2	Belgium	3	2	0	1	3	1	+2	6	Qualified for the quarterfinals
3	China (H)	3	0	1	2	1	6	−5	1	
4	New Zealand	3	0	1	2	1	7	−6	1	

(H) Hosts
7 August 2008
19:45

China	1–1	New Zealand
Dong Fangzhuo 88'	Report	Brockie 53'

Shenyang Olympic Stadium, Shenyang
Attendance: 41,407
Referee: Martín Vázquez (Uruguay)
10 August 2008
17:00

New Zealand	0–5	Brazil
	Report	Anderson 3'; Pato 33'; Ronaldinho 55', 61' (pen.); Sóbis 90+3'

Shenyang Olympic Stadium, Shenyang
Attendance: 44,951
Referee: Stéphane Lannoy (France)
13 August 2008
19:45

New Zealand	0–1	Belgium
	Report	Haroun 35'

Shanghai Stadium, Shanghai
Attendance: 45,202
Referee: Pablo Pozo (Chile)

=== Women's tournament ===
Roster

Head coach: (United Kingdom) John Herdman

New Zealand named a squad of 18 players and 4 alternates for the tournament.

No.	Pos.	Player	Date of birth (age)	Caps	Goals	Club
1	GK	Jenny Bindon	25 February 1973 (aged 35)	23	0	(New Zealand Football) Waitakere City
2	DF	Ria Percival	7 December 1989 (aged 18)	24	2	(United States Soccer Federation) FC Indiana
3	DF	Anna Green	20 August 1990 (aged 17)	8	1	(New Zealand Football) Three Kings United
4	MF	Katie Hoyle	1 February 1988 (aged 20)	12	0	(New Zealand Football) Lynn-Avon United
5	DF	Abby Erceg	20 November 1989 (aged 18)	24	2	(New Zealand Football) Western Springs
6	DF	Rebecca Smith	17 June 1981 (aged 27)	17	2	(Swedish Football Association) Sunnanå SK
7	FW	Ali Riley	30 October 1987 (aged 20)	19	0	(United States Soccer Federation) Stanford Cardinal
8	MF	Hayley Moorwood (captain)	13 February 1984 (aged 24)	32	3	(New Zealand Football) Lynn-Avon United
9	FW	Amber Hearn	28 November 1984 (aged 23)	9	1	(New Zealand Football) Lynn-Avon United
10	MF	Emily McColl	1 November 1985 (aged 22)	17	0	(United States Soccer Federation) Coastal Carolina University
11	MF	Kirsty Yallop	4 November 1986 (aged 21)	16	5	(New Zealand Football) Lynn-Avon United
12	FW	Merissa Smith	11 November 1990 (aged 17)	15	1	(New Zealand Football) Three Kings United
13	FW	Rebecca Tegg	18 December 1985 (aged 22)	5	0	(New Zealand Football) Eastern Suburbs
14	DF	Kristy Hill	1 July 1979 (aged 29)	2	0	(New Zealand Football) Three Kings United
15	FW	Emma Kete	1 September 1987 (aged 20)	11	2	(New Zealand Football) Lynn-Avon United
16	FW	Renee Leota	16 May 1990 (aged 18)	10	1	(New Zealand Football) Miramar Rangers
17	DF	Marlies Oostdam	29 July 1977 (aged 31)	24	0	(New Zealand Football) Eastern Suburbs
18	GK	Rachel Howard	30 November 1977 (aged 30)	14	0	(German Football Association) TSV Crailsheim

Group play

Pos	Team	Pld	W	D	L	GF	GA	GD	Pts	Qualification
1	United States	3	2	0	1	5	2	+3	6	Qualified for the quarterfinals
2	Norway	3	2	0	1	4	5	−1	6	Qualified for the quarterfinals
3	Japan	3	1	1	1	7	4	+3	4	Qualified for the quarterfinals
4	New Zealand	3	0	1	2	2	7	−5	1	

6 August 2008
17:00

Japan	2–2	New Zealand
Miyama 72' (pen.); Sawa 86'	Report	Yallop 37'; Hearn 56' (pen.)

Qinhuangdao Olympic Sports Center Stadium, Qinhuangdao
Attendance: 10,270
Referee: Deidre Mitchell (South Africa)
9 August 2008
19:45

New Zealand	0–1	Norway
	Report	Wiik 8'

Qinhuangdao Olympic Sports Center Stadium, Qinhuangdao
Attendance: 7,285
Referee: Estela Alvarez (Argentina)
12 August 2008
19:45

United States	4–0	New Zealand
O'Reilly 1'; Rodriguez 43'; Tarpley 56'; Hucles 60'	Report

Shenyang Olympic Stadium, Shenyang
Attendance: 12,453
Referee: Dagmar Damkova (Czech Republic)

== Rowing ==
Men

Athlete	Event	Heats		Repechage		Quarterfinals		Semifinals		Final	
Athlete	Event	Time	Rank	Time	Rank	Time	Rank	Time	Rank	Time	Rank
Mahé Drysdale	Single sculls	7:28.80	1 QF	—		6:50.18	1 SA/B	7:05.57	3 FA	7:01.56	3rd place, bronze medalist(s)
George Bridgewater; Nathan Twaddle	Pair	6:41.65	1 SA/B	Bye		—		6:36.05	2 FA	6:44.19	3rd place, bronze medalist(s)
Nathan Cohen; Rob Waddell	Double sculls	6:24.32	1 SA/B	Bye		—		6:24.16	3 FA	6:30.79	4
Peter Taylor; Storm Uru	Lightweight double sculls	6:16.78	1 SA/B	Bye		—		6:30.53	4 FB	6:27.14	7
Hamish Bond; James Dallinger; Carl Meyer; Eric Murray	Four	6:00.73	2 SA/B	Bye		—		5:57.31	4 FB	6:06.30	7

Women

Athlete	Event	Heats		Repechage		Quarterfinals		Semifinals		Final	
Athlete	Event	Time	Rank	Time	Rank	Time	Rank	Time	Rank	Time	Rank
Emma Twigg	Single sculls	7:45.12	1 QF	—		7:34.24	3 SA/B	7:38.09	4 FB	7:51.63	9
Nicky Coles; Juliette Haigh	Pair	7:31.45	2 R	7:32.64	1 FA	—				7:28.80	5
Caroline Evers-Swindell; Georgina Evers-Swindell	Double sculls	7:03.92	1 FA	Bye		—				7:07.32	1st place, gold medalist(s)

Qualification Legend: FA=Final A (medal); FB=Final B (non-medal); FC=Final C (non-medal); FD=Final D (non-medal); FE=Final E (non-medal); FF=Final F (non-medal); SA/B=Semifinals A/B; SC/D=Semifinals C/D; SE/F=Semifinals E/F; QF=Quarterfinals; R=Repechage

== Sailing ==
New Zealand qualified 1 boat for each of the following events. Although Aaron McIntosh and Mark Kennedy qualified for the Tornado class, they did not compete at these Games.

Men

Athlete	Event	Race											Net points	Final rank
Athlete	Event	1	2	3	4	5	6	7	8	9	10	M*	Net points	Final rank
Tom Ashley	RS:X	4	7	7	1	5	5	3	6	8	~~32~~	6	52	1st place, gold medalist(s)
Andrew Murdoch	Laser	2	5	~~40~~	20	24	5	5	17	1	CAN	2	81	5
Peter Burling; Carl Evans	470	7	10	14	12	~~BFD~~	10	22	12	1	7	EL	95	11
Hamish Pepper; Carl Williams	Star	4	9	2	11	1	12	11	~~13~~	5	11	14	80	9

Women

Athlete	Event	Race											Net points	Final rank
Athlete	Event	1	2	3	4	5	6	7	8	9	10	M*	Net points	Final rank
Barbara Kendall	RS:X	12	7	12	4	2	4	3	6	13	~~21~~	12	75	6
Jo Aleh	Laser Radial	~~22~~	4	2	2	2	14	14	14	20	CAN	18	90	7

Open

Athlete	Event	Race											Net points	Final rank
Athlete	Event	1	2	3	4	5	6	7	8	9	10	M*	Net points	Final rank
Dan Slater	Finn	~~21~~	19	18	4	9	7	13	6	CAN	CAN	EL	76	12

M = Medal race; EL = Eliminated – did not advance into the medal race; CAN = Race cancelled

== Shooting ==
Men

Athlete	Event	Qualification		Final	
Athlete	Event	Points	Rank	Points	Rank
Robert Eastham	50 m rifle prone	594	14	Did not advance	
Graeme Ede	Trap	114	20	Did not advance	
Graeme Ede	Double trap	113	18	Did not advance	
Yang Wang	10 m air pistol	571	39	Did not advance	

Women

Athlete	Event	Qualification		Final	
Athlete	Event	Points	Rank	Points	Rank
Nadine Stanton	Trap	63	10	Did not advance	

== Swimming ==
Men

Athlete	Event	Heat		Semifinal		Final	
Athlete	Event	Time	Rank	Time	Rank	Time	Rank
Moss Burmester	100 m butterfly	52.67	32	Did not advance			
Moss Burmester	200 m butterfly	1:55.80	10 Q	1:55.26	7 Q	1:54.35	4
Dean Kent	200 m individual medley	2:01.12	21	Did not advance			
Glenn Snyders	100 m breaststroke	1:00.98	20	Did not advance			
Glenn Snyders	200 m breaststroke	2:11.19	16 Q	2:12.07	16	Did not advance	
Corney Swanepoel	100 m butterfly	51.78 NR	9 Q	52.01	12	Did not advance	
William Benson; Orinoco Faamausili-Banse; Cameron Gibson; Mark Herring	4 × 100 m freestyle relay	3:15.41	11	—		Did not advance	
Daniel Bell; Cameron Gibson; Glenn Snyders; Corney Swanepoel	4 × 100 m medley relay	3:34.09	6 Q	—		3:33.39	5

Women

Athlete	Event	Heat		Semifinal		Final	
Athlete	Event	Time	Rank	Time	Rank	Time	Rank
Elizabeth Coster	100 m backstroke	1:00.66	15 Q	1:01.45	16	Did not advance	
Melissa Ingram	100 m backstroke	1:01.24	20	Did not advance			
Melissa Ingram	200 m backstroke	2:09.34	8 Q	2:09.70	11	Did not advance	
Helen Norfolk	200 m individual medley	2:13.50	18	Did not advance			
Helen Norfolk	400 m individual medley	4:44.22	24	—		Did not advance	
Lauren Boyle; Natasha Hind; Helen Norfolk; Hayley Palmer	4 × 200 m freestyle relay	DSQ		—		Did not advance	

== Synchronized swimming ==
Athlete	Event	Technical routine		Free routine (preliminary)			Free routine (final)		
Athlete	Event	Points	Rank	Points	Total (technical + free)	Rank	Points	Total (technical + free)	Rank
Lisa Daniels; Nina Daniels	Duet	40.750	23	40.417	81.167	23	Did not advance		

== Taekwondo ==
Athlete	Event	Round of 16	Quarterfinals	Semifinals	Repechage	Bronze Medal	Final	
Athlete	Event	Opposition Result	Opposition Result	Opposition Result	Opposition Result	Opposition Result	Opposition Result	Rank
Logan Campbell	Men's −68 kg	Sung Y-C (TPE); L 0–4	Did not advance					
Matthew Beach	Men's +80 kg	Liu Xb (CHN); L 1–4	Did not advance					
Robin Cheong	Women's −57 kg	Bah (CIV); W 1–0	Lim S-J (KOR); L 1–4	Did not advance	Su L-W (TPE); L 0–1	Did not advance		

== Tennis ==
Athlete	Event	Round of 64	Round of 32	Round of 16	Quarterfinals	Semifinals	Final / BM	
Athlete	Event	Opposition Score	Opposition Score	Opposition Score	Opposition Score	Opposition Score	Opposition Score	Rank
Marina Erakovic	Women's singles	Morita (JPN); L 7–5, 6–7^{(7–9)}, 4–6	Did not advance					

== Triathlon ==
Athlete	Event	Swim (1.5 km)	Trans 1	Bike (40 km)	Trans 2	Run (10 km)	Total Time	Rank
Bevan Docherty	Men's	18:45	0:28	1:17:42	0:26	30:57	1:49:05.59	3rd place, bronze medalist(s)
Kris Gemmell	Men's	19:06	0:25	1:17:40	0:27	35:42	1:53:49.47	39
Shane Reed	Men's	18:00	0:28	1:17:47	0:27	34:34	1:52:48.16	34
Andrea Hewitt	Women's	19:54	0:29	1:24:38	0:29	35:38	2:00:45.99	8
Debbie Tanner	Women's	19:57	0:29	1:24:43	0:29	35:54	2:01:06.92	10
Samantha Warriner	Women's	19:58	0:30	1:24:43	0:35	36:55	2:02:13.60	16

== Weightlifting ==
Athlete	Event	Snatch		Clean & Jerk		Total	Rank
Athlete	Event	Result	Rank	Result	Rank	Total	Rank
Mark Spooner	Men's −69 kg	123	26	158	19	281	21
Richie Patterson	Men's −77 kg	130	25	170	18	300	21

== Officials ==
- Chef de Mission: Dave Currie

== See also ==
- New Zealand at the 2008 Summer Paralympics
