= Vincent Voorn =

Dutch show jumper (born 1984)

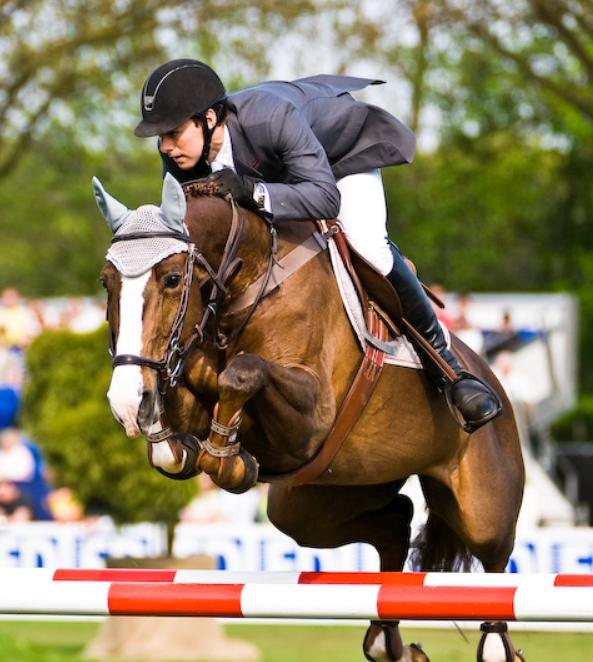
Vincent Voorn with Radja, Grand Prix of Eindhoven (CSI 3*) 2008

Vincent Voorn (born 16 February 1984 in Someren) is a Dutch show jumper. His father is Albert Voorn who also competed as an international show jumper.

Voorn won the Dutch National Championship for young riders in 2004 with his horse Gestion Priamus Z. In 2005 he represented the Netherlands at the European Championships in Schaffhausen where he and Gestion Priamus Z won the gold medal. Two years later in Mannheim, 2007 he won another European title, although this time in the team competition instead of as an individual.

Voorn was selected by coach Rob Ehrens to represent the Netherlands at the 2008 Summer Olympics in Beijing. He formed a team with Gerco Schröder, Marc Houtzager and Angelique Hoorn. Houtzager and Hoorn joined the team after former Olympic champions Jeroen Dubbeldam and Albert Zoer had to withdraw due to injuries. He finished tied for 40th position in the individual show jumping and was part of the Dutch team that finished 4th in the team jumping.
