= Lyubov Kochetova =

Russian equestrian

Personal information
- Nationality: Russian
- Born: 7 May 1982 (age 42); Kuzmolovsky, Russia

Sport
- Sport: Equestrian

Lyubov Kochetova (born 7 May 1982) is a Russian equestrian. She competed in the individual jumping event at the 2008 Summer Olympics.
