= Zhang Bin (equestrian) =

Chinese equestrian

Personal information
- Full name: 张滨, Pinyin: Zhāng Bīn
- Nationality: CHN
- Discipline: Show jumping
- Born: 5 February 1973 (age 53); Shanghai, China
- Height: 5 ft 11 in (180 cm)
- Weight: 73 kg (161 lb)
- Horse: Coertis

Zhang Bin (born 5 February 1973) is a Chinese equestrian rider. He competed in the individual and team jumping events at the 2008 Summer Olympics. He also came first in the 2005 National Games in the same competitions.
