= Faisal Al-Shalan =

Saudi Arabian equestrian (born 1987)

Faisal Al Shalan
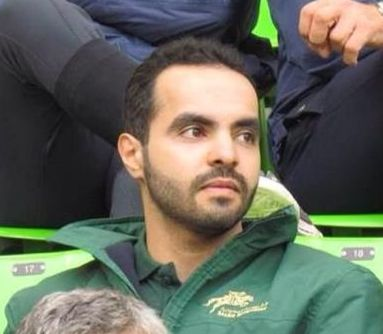

Personal information
- Full name: Prince Faisal Al Shalan
- Nationality: Saudi Arabia
- Discipline: Show jumping
- Born: 1 January 1987 (age 39); Riyadh, Saudi Arabia
- Height: 1.80 m (5 ft 11 in)
- Weight: 77 kg (170 lb)
Medal record
Equestrian
Representing Saudi Arabia
Asian Games
Silver medal – second place	2014 Incheon	Team jumping
Pan Arab Games
Gold medal – first place	2011 Doha	Team jumping
Bronze medal – third place	2011 Doha	Individual jumping
Islamic Solidarity Games
Gold medal – first place	2005 Jeddah	Individual jumping
Gold medal – first place	2005 Jeddah	Overall Individual jumping
FEI Children's International Jumping Final
Bronze medal – third place	1999 Abu Dhabi	Individual jumping

Prince Faisal Al Shalan (Arabic: الأمير فيصل الشعلان; born January 5, 1987, in Riyadh) is a Saudi Arabian equestrian rider. He won several medals in show jumping events, including gold for the national equestrian team, at the 2011 Pan Arab Games in Doha, Qatar. He also earned a silver medal in team jumping at the 2014 Asian Games in Incheon, South Korea.

== Equestrian career ==
Coming from the House of Saud, Al Shalan grew up around horses in his birthplace Riyadh, but derived a slight enjoyment with riding. At the age of seven, he won his first competition on his little white pony from England called Snowdrop, until he was bitten by a riding bug. While at elementary school, Al Shalan met Khaled Al Eid and Ramzy Al Duhami, who later served as his trainer for his career, in a summer clinic. Having tasted success, he progressed from ponies to horses, and claimed his first career title for the under-14 category at the Abu Dhabi World Championships.

In 2004, Al Shalan made his official debut on the international scene, when he reached the final of the King Abdulaziz Cup and Saudi Arabian Equestrian Championships. He achieved early successes by winning individual gold medals at the 2005 Islamic Games, and finishing second at the 2006 World Cup Arab League. Al Shalan also became the youngest ever competitor at the 2006 FEI World Equestrian Games in Aachen, Germany, riding on Uthago in the individual and team events.

Riding on Wido, Al Shalan eventually competed as a member of the Saudi Arabian equestrian team, at the 2008 Summer Olympics in Beijing. He was eliminated at the second stage of qualifying rounds for the individual event, after knocking down eight fences and incurring three time penalties, which placed him in the bottom twenty places of a 75-strong field. A few hours later, Al Shalan helped his teammates Al Duhami, Kamal Bahamdan, and His Royal Highness Prince Abdullah Al Saud to an eleventh-place finish in the team event.

At the 2011 Pan Arab Games in Doha, Qatar, Al Shalan was awarded a gold medal after a spectacular performance in the team event, along with his fellow riders Bahamdan, Al Eid, and Al Saud. He continued to capture a bronze medal in the individual show jumping event, with his 11-year-old mare Aphrodite van het Rexelhof.

== Personal life and education ==
In May 2011, he graduated from the University of Miami in the United States of America, with a Bachelor of Science in Business Administration (BSBA), majoring in Mathematical economics. He also has a Master of Science in Economics & Strategy from Imperial College London in the United Kingdom. He’s a CAIA charter holder; Chartered Alternative Investment Analyst, and a CISI member; Islamic finance qualification. Furthermore, He speaks 4 languages bilingual proficiency; Arabic, English, French, and Spanish. He spent most of his adult life living in Europe and abroad between Paris, Brussels, London, Miami and New York for the last twelve years.
