= Christina Liebherr =

Swiss equestrian

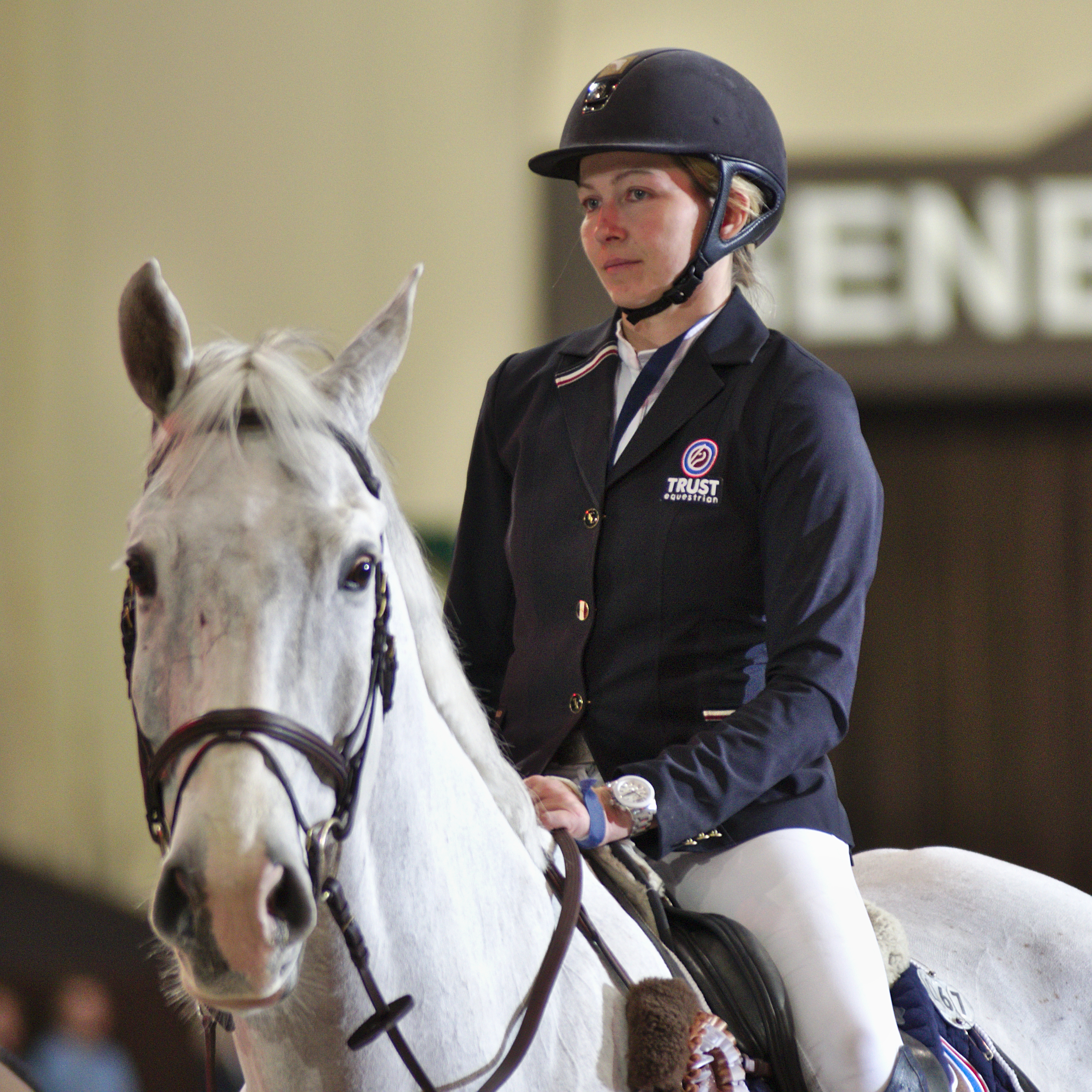

Personal information
- Full name: Christina Liebherr
- Nationality: Switzerland
- Discipline: Show jumping
- Born: 16 March 1979 (age 46); Stuttgart, West Germany
- Height: 5 ft 7 in (1.70 m)
- Weight: 132 lb (60 kg; 9 st 6 lb)
Medal record
Representing Switzerland
Equestrian
Olympic Games
Bronze medal – third place	2008 Beijing	Team jumping
European Championships
Silver medal – second place	2005 San Patrignano	Individual jumping
Silver medal – second place	2005 San Patrignano	Team jumping

Christina Liebherr (born 16 March 1979) is a Swiss equestrian who competes in the sport of show jumping.

She won the bronze medal at the 2008 Summer Olympics in team jumping following the disqualification of Norwegian rider Tony André Hansen.

== Career ==
Christina Liebherr began riding at the age of nine. From December 1995 till August 2011 she was trained by German Rider Susanne Behring.

She was selected for the 2008 Summer Olympics where she rode LB No Mercy and won the bronze medal in team jumping following the disqualification of Norwegian rider Tony André Hansen.

== Personal life ==
Her grandfather is the founder of the Liebherr Group; Hans Liebherr.

== Horses ==
=== Current ===
- LB Callas Sitte (born 1998), Zangersheide, Mare, sire: Calvaro Z, Owner: Hans Liebherr
- LB Con Grazia CH (born 2003), Mare, sire: Con Spirito R, damsire: Karondo v. Schlösslihof, Owner: Hans Liebherr

=== Former show horses ===
- LB No Mercy (born 1995), Gelding, sire: Libero H, damsire: Dillenburg, Owner: Hans Liebherr

== Successes ==
- Olympic Games:
  - 2004: with LB No Mercy - Rank 5 (Team) + Rank 14 (Individual)
  - 2008: with LB No Mercy - Rank 3 (Team)
- FEI World Equestrian Games
  - 2006, Aachen: Rank 5 (Team) + Rank 11 (Individual)
- European Championships:
  - 2005, San Patrignano: Rank 2 (Team) + Rank 2 (Individual)
