= Beezie Madden =

American equestrian (born 1963)

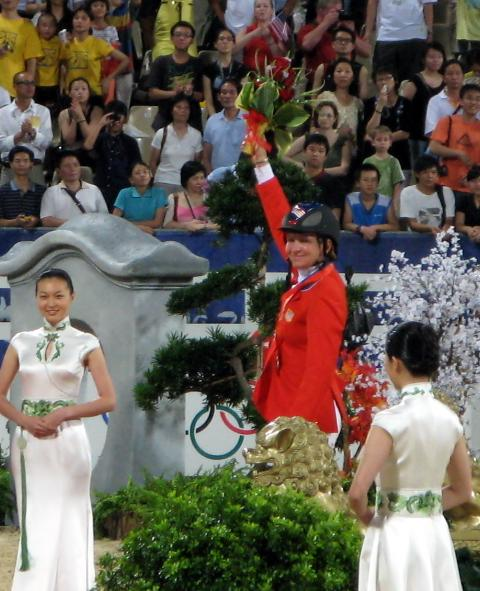
- Madden on the medals stand in 2008.

Personal information
- Full name: Elizabeth Madden
- Nickname: Beezie
- Born: Elizabeth Patton; November 20, 1963 (age 62) Milwaukee, Wisconsin, U.S.
- Spouse: John Madden
Medal record
Equestrian
Representing the United States
Olympic Games
Gold medal – first place	2004 Athens	Team jumping
Gold medal – first place	2008 Beijing	Team jumping
Silver medal – second place	2016 Rio de Janeiro	Team jumping
Bronze medal – third place	2008 Beijing	Individual jumping
World Championships
Silver medal – second place	2006 Aachen	Individual jumping
Silver medal – second place	2006 Aachen	Team jumping
Bronze medal – third place	2014 Normandy	Individual jumping
Bronze medal – third place	2014 Normandy	Team jumping
Pan American Games
Gold medal – first place	2003 Santo Domingo	Team jumping
Gold medal – first place	2011 Guadalajara	Team jumping
Silver medal – second place	2011 Guadalajara	Individual jumping
Bronze medal – third place	2019 Lima	Individual jumping
Bronze medal – third place	2019 Lima	Team jumping

Elizabeth Madden (née Patton; born 20 November 1963) is an American Olympic champion equestrian competing in show jumping. She has two Olympic golds and one silver in team jumping, and an individual bronze. She won the FEI Show Jumping World Cup twice; won two silvers and two bronzes at World Championships; and won two golds, one silver and two bronzes at the Pan American Games. She was the first American to break into the international top three show jumping ranking, and the first woman to win over one million dollars in show jumping prize money.

She competed at the 2004 Athens Olympics, winning team gold for the United States; at the 2008 Beijing Olympics winning team gold and individual bronze; at the 2012 London Olympics; and at the 2016 Rio Olympics winning team silver. She and her husband John Madden own and operate John Madden Sales, a horse training and sales business, out of Cazenovia, New York.

== Early life and education ==
Madden was born Elizabeth Patton in Milwaukee, Wisconsin, the daughter of Kathleen "Kathy" McGregor/Schlesinger and Joseph "Joe" Patton. Her parents were involved in horse training and sales, and eventually built a stable of their own. As a child, she rode at the Milwaukee Hunt Club, where her parents kept the horses they trained and sold. She began riding at three years old and received her first pony as a Christmas gift at roughly age four or five. She named the pony Flicka. Her brother Stuart also rode, and received a pony for Christmas that same year, naming it Fudge. They rode the ponies bareback, as they only had bridles. Madden began competing at about age six. She rode in the hunters for most of her junior career, but competed equitation for her last two junior years, and jumpers in her final year. Her highest finish in equitation was eighth at the Medal Final, a national competition.

She attended Southern Seminary Junior College and rode for the school's team in addition to playing basketball and softball. In 1984, she won the Cacchione Cup at the Intercollegiate Horse Show Association's national competition. Madden graduated as valedictorian and was accepted at University of Virginia. She opted to take a job at Katie Monahan's farm instead of attending university.

== Career ==
Madden worked and lived at Katie Monahan's property for four years. While there, she met her future husband, John Madden, who was also working for Monahan at the time.

Madden began riding grand prix, show jumping's highest level, at age 22 in 1985. She made her international debut in 1987, representing the United States at the World Cup in Paris. In 1988, John and Beezie bought a farm in Cazenovia, New York. In November 1998, they got married. In 2002, she attended her first World Equestrian Games in Jerez, Spain.

At the 2004 Olympic Games in Athens, Madden won the gold medal as part of the United States team in team jumping, together with Peter Wylde, McLain Ward and Chris Kappler. That year, Madden also became the first woman ever to pass the $1 million mark in show jumping earnings.

At the 2008 Beijing Summer Olympics, Madden earned gold in the team jumping competition along with Laura Kraut, Will Simpson and McLain Ward. She also earned a bronze in the individual show jumping competition. She placed first in the Animal Planet Sport Horse cup aboard Judgement that year. During the 2008 Rolex Events in Las Vegas, Authentic threw Madden into a jump, and later was disqualified from the entire event.

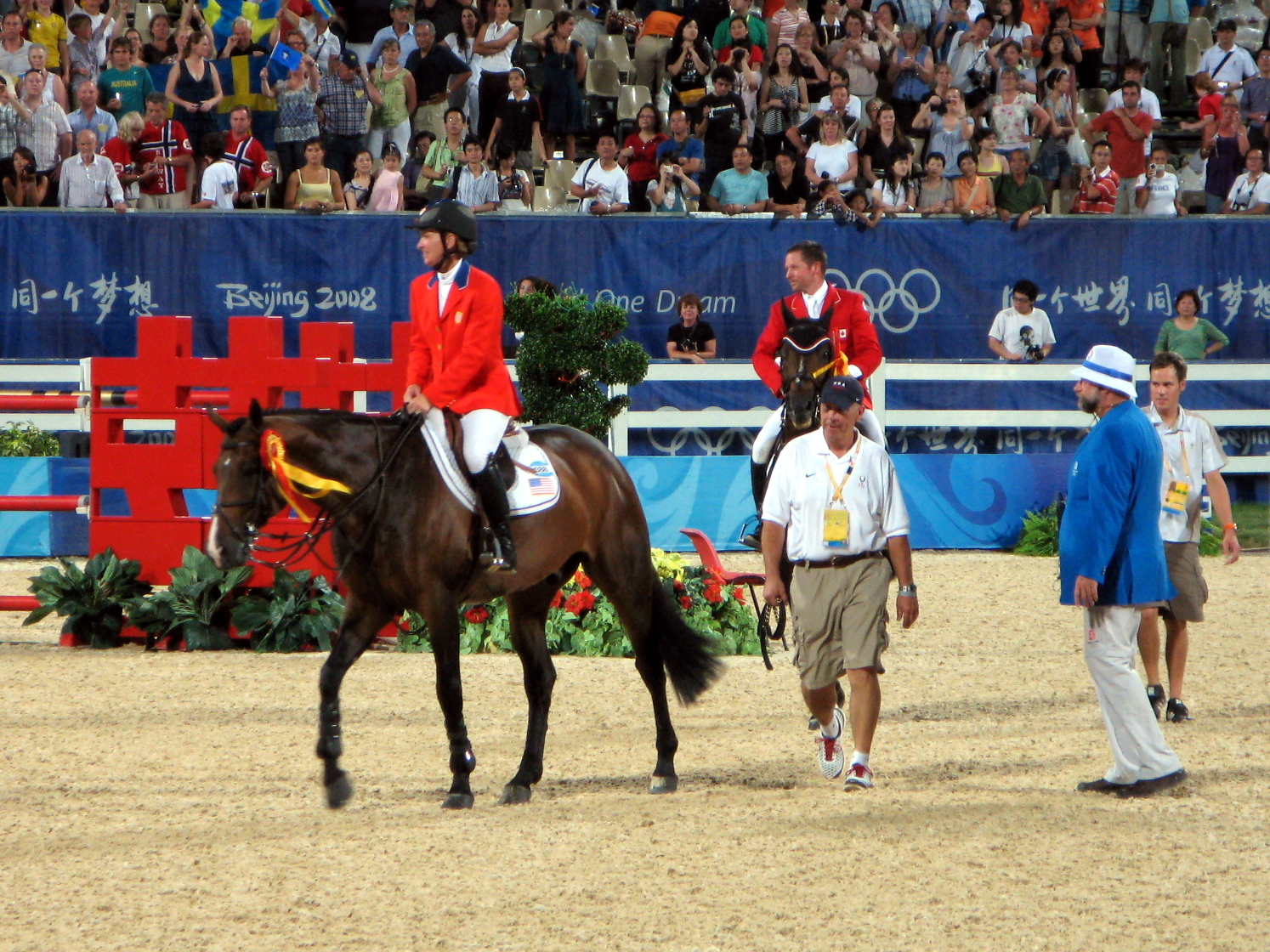
Madden riding Authentic (left) at the 2008 Olympic Games ceremony

In 2012, Madden competed in the 2012 London Summer Olympics for the United States on Coral Reef Via Volo.

In 2013, she was the 4th ranked rider in the world in the FEI Longines Rider Rankings and the number one woman rider. To accomplish this goal she won the Show Jumping World Cup in Gothenburg, Sweden on Simon, the $125,000 FEI World Cup Grand Prix at the FTI Consulting Winter Equestrian Festival in Wellington, Florida on Cortes 'C', was a member of Team USA winning the $75,000 Furusiyya FEI Nations Cup CSIO4* at the FTI Consulting Winter Equestrian Festival in Wellington, Florida, again on Simon, the $35,000 RBC Capital Markets Cup 1.50 m at Spruce Meadows in Calgary, Alberta on Amadora, the $60,000 Great West-Life Cup at Spruce Meadows in Calgary, Alberta on Coral Reef Via Volo. the Global Champions Tour CSI5* Grand Prix of Chantilly in France on Cortes 'C' and the $100,000 American Gold Cup Qualifier in North Salem, New York on Coral Reef Via Volo.

In 2014, riding Cortes 'C', Madden was the first woman to win the King George Gold Cup at Hickstead, and the first woman to win the same competition back to back in the King George V Cup when she won again on the same mount in 2015. In May 2014, Madden and Breitling LS fell during a competition. The horse was uninjured, but Madden broke her collarbone and was on a six-week hiatus after surgery. Immediately after the hiatus, Madden competed at the 2014 World Equestrian Games, winning a team and individual bronze aboard Cortes 'C'. The horse was voted the Best Horse of the Games. She also won the $200,000 Budweiser American Invitational in Tampa with Coral Reef Via Volo in 2014. As of 2014 Madden was 2nd in all-time prize money winnings at Spruce Meadows. Madden also won the USEF Equestrian of the Year award again in 2014, making her the first rider to win this award four times. In 2015, Madden competed in her tenth FEI Jumping World Cup Final with Simon in Las Vegas where she finished as the top US rider and 4th overall. Later that year, Madden and Breitling LS were 10th in the $50,000 Douglas Elliman Grand Prix Qualifier and 11th in the $250,000 Hampton Classic Grand Prix CSI****.

In 2016, the U.S. Team won the FEI Nations Cup with Madden aboard Breitling LS. Madden and Cortes 'C' were named to the 2016 U.S. Olympic show jumping team, making this her fourth Olympics, along with McLain Ward, Lucy Davis, and Kent Farrington. At the 2016 Olympics, Madden won team silver. Age fifty-two at the Games, she was the oldest female athlete on the United States Olympic team in Rio. Madden and Cortes 'C' traveled to Europe to show with the U.S. Team, as they tied with France for the silver medal in the Furusiyya FEI Nations Cup presented by Longines in Italy.

Some of Madden's best-known horses have been Authentic, Cortes C, and Judgement (now retired). As of 2016, Madden currently has seven horses that she competes on regularly; most are owned by her longtime sponsor, Abigail Wexner, of New Albany, Ohio.

In April 2018 she again became the Longines FEI World Cup champion riding Breitling LS. With this victory, Beezie Madden became the oldest athlete to win the World Cup, at age 54. In 2019, Madden competed at the Pan American Games in Lima, winning two bronzes.

In February 2020, Madden announced that she will semi-retire after the 2020 Tokyo Olympics, shifting her focus to training horses and riders.

== International Championship Results ==
Results
Year	Event	Horse	Placing	Notes
1987	World Cup Final	Medrano	18th	
2002	World Equestrian Games	Judgement	6th	Team
2002	World Equestrian Games	Judgement	29th	Individual
2003	World Cup Final	Judgement	30th	
2003	Pan American Games	Conquest II	1st place, gold medalist(s)	Team
2003	Pan American Games	Conquest II	33rd	Individual
2004	Olympic Games	Authentic	1st place, gold medalist(s)	Team
2004	Olympic Games	Authentic	28th	Individual
2006	World Cup Final	Judgement	13th	
2006	World Equestrian Games	Authentic	2nd place, silver medalist(s)	Team
2006	World Equestrian Games	Authentic	2nd place, silver medalist(s)	Individual
2007	World Cup Final	Authentic	39th	
2008	Olympic Games	Authentic	1st place, gold medalist(s)	Team
2008	Olympic Games	Authentic	3rd place, bronze medalist(s)	Individual
2009	World Cup Final	Danny Boy	12th	
2011	World Cup Final	Coral Reef Via Volo / Danny Boy	4th	
2011	Pan American Games	Coral Reef Via Volo	1st place, gold medalist(s)	Team
2011	Pan American Games	Coral Reef Via Volo	2nd place, silver medalist(s)	Individual
2012	World Cup Final	Cortes 'C'	17th	
2012	Olympic Games	Coral Reef Via Volo	6th	Team
2012	Olympic Games	Coral Reef Via Volo	EL	Individual
2013	World Cup Final	Simon	1st place, gold medalist(s)	
2014	World Cup Final	Simon	7th	
2014	World Equestrian Games	Cortes 'C'	3rd place, bronze medalist(s)	Team
2014	World Equestrian Games	Cortes 'C'	3rd place, bronze medalist(s)	Individual
2015	World Cup Final	Simon	4th	
2016	Olympic Games	Cortes 'C'	2nd place, silver medalist(s)	Team
2016	Olympic Games	Cortes 'C'	46th	Individual
2018	World Cup Final	Breitling LS	1st place, gold medalist(s)	
EL = Eliminated; RET = Retired; WD = Withdrew
