= Authentic (show jumping horse) =

Dutch warmblood gelding (1995–2025)

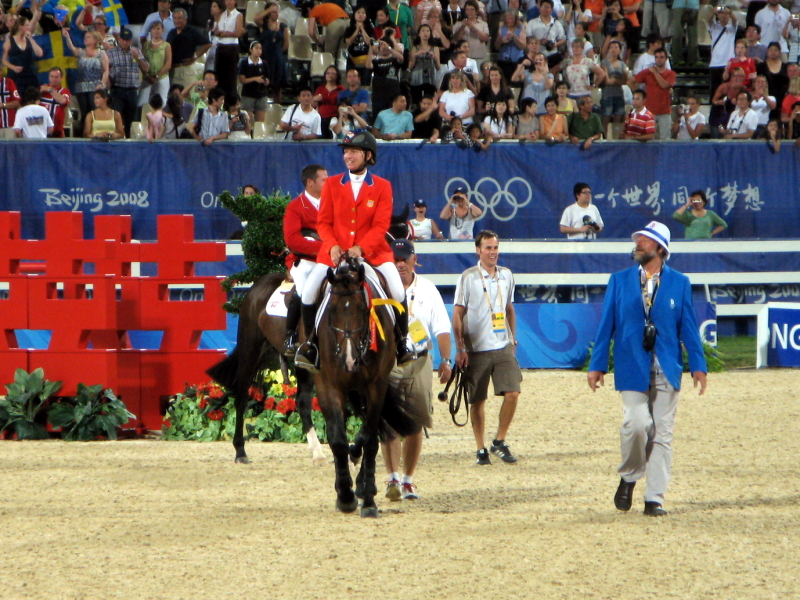
- Authentic, ridden by Beezie Madden, at the 2008 Olympics
- Breed: Dutch Warmblood (KWPN)
- Sire: Guidam (Selle Français)
- Dam: Gerlinda (KWPN)
- Maternal grandsire: Katell (TB)
- Sex: Gelding
- Foaled: June 22, 1995; Wierden, Netherlands
- Died: April 9, 2025 (aged 29)
- Country: United States
- Colour: Bay
- Owner: Abigail Wexner
- Rider: Beezie Madden

Authentic
Medal record

Equestrian

Representing the United States

Summer Olympics
Gold medal – first place	2004 Athens	Team show jumping
Gold medal – first place	2008 Beijing	Team show jumping
Bronze medal – third place	2008 Beijing	Individual show jumping

FEI World Equestrian Games
Silver medal – second place	2006 Aachen	Individual show jumping
Silver medal – second place	2006 Aachen	Team show jumping

Authentic (June 22, 1995 – April 9, 2025), nicknamed Bud, was a Dutch Warmblood gelding that competed in show jumping. He won three Olympic medals and two World Equestrian Games medals. He was owned by Abigail Wexner, and was ridden by Olympic medalist Beezie Madden. Authentic was a bay with a star and snip and stood 16.1 hands (65 inches, 165 cm) high. He was retired from competition in 2009 to Cazanovia, NY, at the Maddens' farm. Authentic died on April 9, 2025, at the age of 29.

== Pedigree ==
Jalisco B (Selle Français)
Quidam de Revel (Selle Français)
Dirka (Selle Français)
Guidam (Selle Français)
Venutard (Selle Français)
Fougere (Selle Français)
Bagatelle (Selle Français)
Authentic
Guillaume Tell (Thoroughbred)
Katell (Thoroughbred)
Ikatina (Thoroughbred)
Gerlinda (KWPN)
Lucky Boy (Thoroughbred)
Zinda (KWPN)
Linda (KWPN)

== Competitive career ==
In 2004, Authentic and Madden made double-clear rounds at the Athens Olympic Games which helped the U.S team win the gold medal. The team also won the $25,000 PDP WEP Challenge Cup Series Round V that same year.

In 2005 the pair were part of the American team that won its first ever Samsung Super League Nations' Cup. In 2006, at the FEI World Equestrian Games, Authentic and Madden won the Individual and Team Silver medal, in doing so, Authentic jumped nine rounds without dropping a rail. Recognizing these accomplishments, Authentic was named USEF Show Jumping Horse of the Year in both 2005 and 2006, and was named the 2006 Farnam/Platform United States Equestrian Federation Horse of the Year. In both 2006 and 2007, Authentic and Madden won the Budweiser American Invitational. In 2007, they won the Rolex Grand Prix of Aachen.

In 2008, Authentic and Madden won the $30,000 WEF Challenge Cup Round VIII, and the $200,000 CN Worldwide Grand Prix. The team next received the team show jumping gold medal and an individual bronze medal at the 2008 Beijing Olympic Games. Of particular note was the jump-off for the individual bronze, where Authentic jumped clean and with a fast time of 35.25 seconds on a shortened course where the time allowed was 40 seconds.
