= Niklaus Schurtenberger =

Swiss equestrian

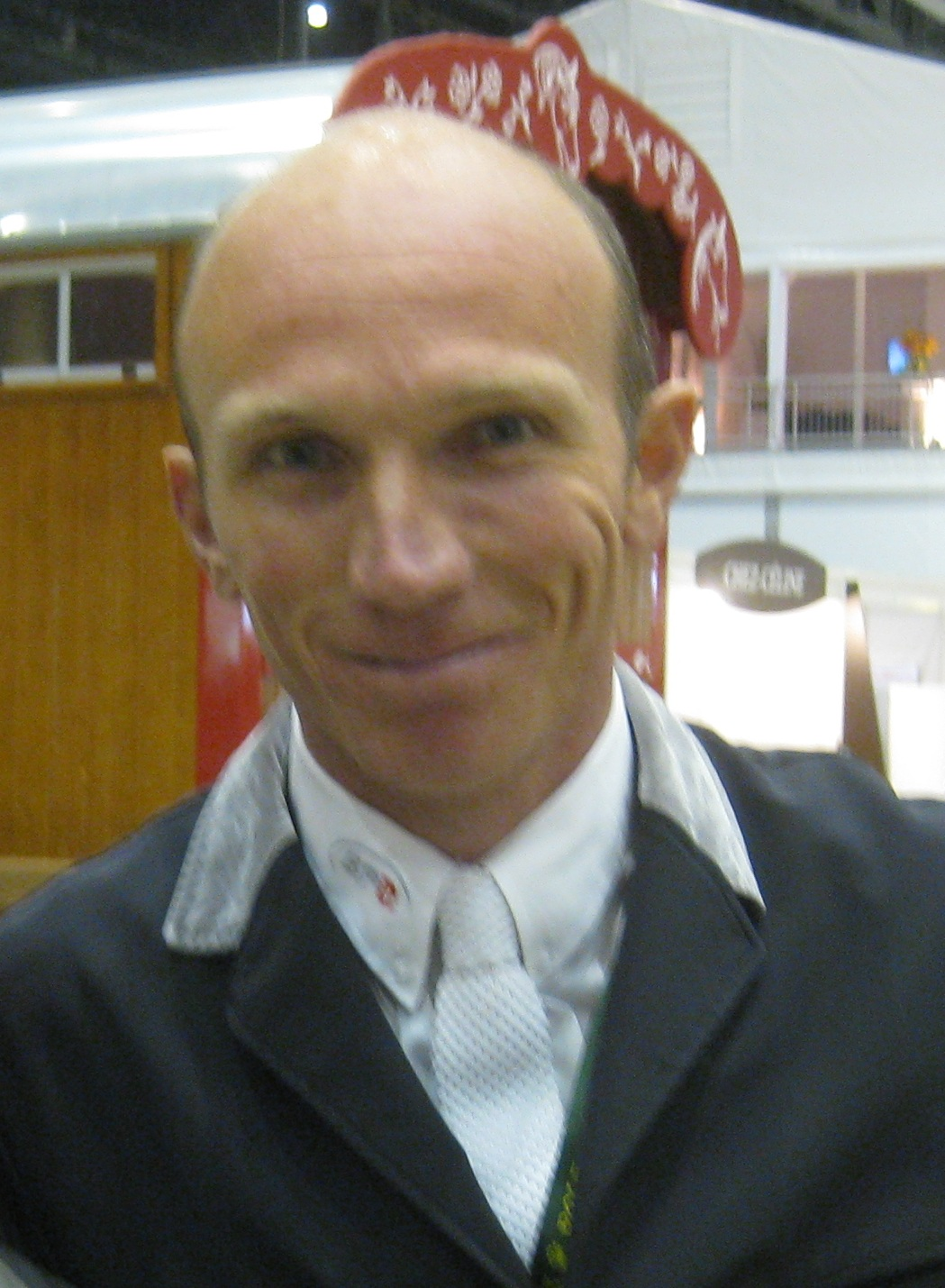

Personal information
- Full name: Niklaus Schurtenberger
- Nationality: Switzerland
- Discipline: Show jumping
- Born: 7 February 1968 (age 57); Lyss, Switzerland
- Height: 5 ft 5 in (1.65 m)
- Weight: 143 lb (65 kg; 10 st 3 lb)
Medal record
Representing Switzerland
Equestrian
Olympic Games
Bronze medal – third place	2008 Beijing	Team jumping

Niklaus Schurtenberger (born 7 February 1968) is a Swiss equestrian who competes in the sport of show jumping. He won the bronze medal at the 2008 Summer Olympics in team jumping following the disqualification of Norwegian rider Tony André Hansen.
