= Jamal Rahimov =

Azerbaijani equestrian

Personal information
- Nationality: Azerbaijani
- Born: 16 September 1987 (age 38) Baku, Azerbaijan
- Height: 1.78
- Weight: 72

Sport
- Country: Azerbaijan
- Sport: Show jumping
- Team: AZE

Achievements and titles
- Olympic finals: Beijing 2008, London 2012
Medal record
Heydar Aliyev Show Jumping Cup
Gold medal – first place	2011 Baku	Individual jumping
Gold medal – first place	2012 Baku	Individual jumping
Gold medal – first place	2014 Baku	Individual jumping

Jamal Rahimov (born 16 September 1987 in Baku) is an Azerbaijani equestrian showjumper. He has represented Azerbaijan twice at the Olympic Games: in 2008 and 2012.

== Career ==
He started show jumping in 1998 in Istanbul. He graduated from The Istanbul International Community School.

He is the first showjumper to represent Azerbaijan in the equestrian events at the Olympic Games.

== Personal life ==
He moved to Istanbul with his family, when he was three. He lives in Belgium.

He is the grandson of Hasan Hasanov, the former ambassador of Azerbaijan in Poland.

He has a B.A. in Business Management from the Regent's Business School in London. Rahimov fluently speaks Azerbaijani, English, French, Russian and Turkish. He has a good knowledge of Italian and Portuguese too.

== Olympics 2008 ==
At the 2008 Olympic Games Rahimov competed in the individual jumping. He ended at the second qualification round because he fell from his horse, Ionesco de Brekka who was bought by Rahimov for 1,96 mln euro.

== Olympics 2012 ==
At the 2012 Olympic Games Rahimov competed in the same event. He ended at the second qualification round too.
