= Mac Cone =

Canadian equestrian

Personal information
- Born: August 23, 1952 (age 74)
Medal record
Equestrian
Olympic Games
Silver medal – second place	2008 Beijing	Team jumping

Mac Cone (born August 23, 1952, in Memphis, Tennessee, United States) is a Canadian citizen who competes in show jumping.

At the 2008 Summer Olympics in Beijing, Cone won the silver medal as part of the Canadian team in team jumping, together with Jill Henselwood, Eric Lamaze, and Ian Millar.

He rides a 12-year-old Dutch Warmblood gelding named Ole. Mac also rides an 8-year-old Dutch Warmblood named Unanimous. Unanimous is by Andiamo and is owned by Southern Ways Limited and the Unanimous Group.

Mac Cone is the only rider to have ridden as a member of both the Canadian Equestrian Team and the United States Equestrian Team. He currently lives in King City, Ontario, Canada where he coaches at the Southern Ways equestrian facility.
