= Marc Houtzager =

Dutch equestrian (born 1971)

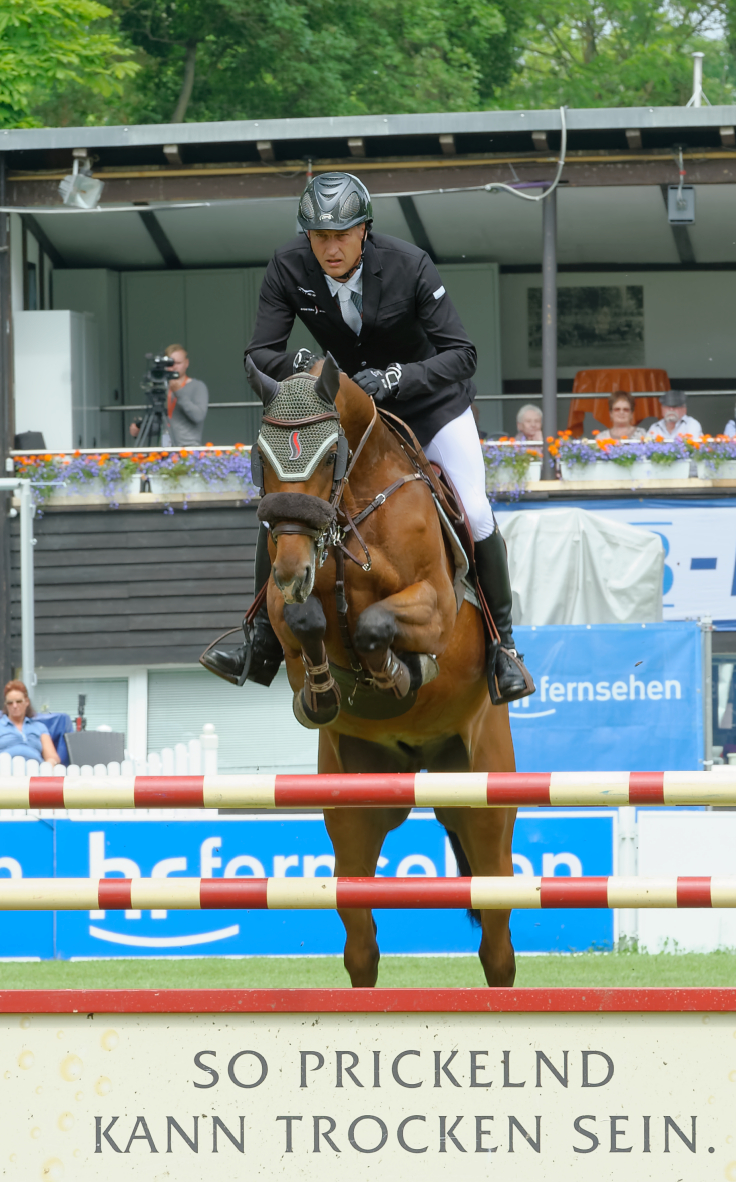
- Marc Houtzager with Claimer, Wiesbaden 2015 CSIYH*

Personal information
- Nationality: Dutch
- Born: 9 January 1971 (age 55)

Sport
- Country: Netherlands
- Sport: Equestrian
Medal record
Equestrian
Representing Netherlands
Olympic Games
Silver medal – second place	2012 London	Team jumping

Marc Houtzager (born 9 January 1971 in Rouveen) is a Dutch equestrian whose specialty is show jumping.

== Early life ==
Houtzager began riding when he was 10 years old. His parents were caterers and he began to ride ponies at a place where they worked.

== Competitions ==
At the 2012 Summer Olympics in London, Houtzager rode Sterrehof's Tamino as was part of the Dutch team that won the silver medal in the team jumping event.

Houtzager competed in the 2002 Show Jumping World Cup circuit and won the meeting in Dublin. After that he kept on riding international tournaments, but never succeeded on World Cup level again. In 2008 he and his teammates became Dutch national champion in Mierlo. Houtzager himself won an additional silver medal at the event in the individual competition. He was selected to represent the Netherlands at the Super League meeting in Rome where they finished fourth. At the CHIO in Rotterdam he became fifth in the individual competition. Later that year he finished fourth at the Grand Prix in Aachen with his horse Opium.

Due to injuries of former Olympic champion Jeroen Dubbeldam and Albert Zoer he and Angelique Hoorn were selected by coach Rob Ehrens to represent the Netherlands at the 2008 Summer Olympics in Beijing. Houtzager and Hoorn competed in both the individual as well as the team competition in which they formed a team with Gerco Schröder and Vincent Voorn.
