= Angelique Hoorn =

Dutch show jumper (born 1975)

Angelique Hoorn (born 25 April 1975 in Wanneperveen) is a Dutch show jumper.

As a newcomer Hoorn reached the fourth position at the 2000 Dutch National Show Jumping Championships, announcing her appearance for the upcoming years. Together with her horse Hascal she won the 2001 Championship in Papendal. She was selected to compete in the Show Jumping World Cup circuit and managed to win a silver medal at the meeting in Jerez in 2002. A few years of less successful years followed, but in 2006 she finished third at the Dutch nationals behind Gerco Schröder and Harrie Smolders. In Mierlo in 2007 she won her second national title with her horse Blaudendraad's O'Brien, finishing in front of Gerco Schröder, Erik van Vleuten and Ben Schröder.

Due to injuries of former Olympic champion Jeroen Dubbeldam and Albert Zoer she and Marc Houtzager were selected by coach Rob Ehrens to represent the Netherlands at the 2008 Summer Olympics in Beijing. Hoorn and Houtzager will compete in both the individual as well as the team competition in which they form a team with Gerco Schröder and Vincent Voorn.
