= Will Simpson (equestrian) =

American equestrian

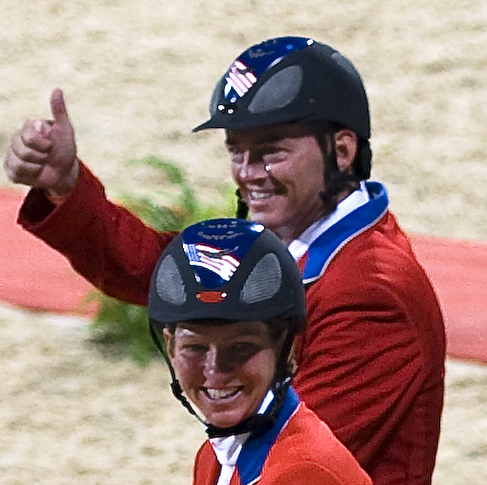
- Beezie Madden on Authentic and Will Simpson on Carlsson vom Dach

Personal information
- Born: June 9, 1959 (age 67); Springfield, Illinois, U.S
Medal record
Equestrian
Representing the United States
Olympic Games
Gold medal – first place	2008 Beijing	Team jumping

William "Will" Simpson (born June 9, 1959, in Springfield, Illinois) is an American show jumping competitor and Olympic champion.

At the 2008 Summer Olympics in Beijing, Simpson won the gold medal as part of the United States team in team jumping, together with McLain Ward, Laura Kraut, and Beezie Madden.

In 2010 Simpson was featured in the television series A Rider's Story along with his wife, fellow Grand Prix show jumper Nicole Shahinian-Simpson.

== Early life ==
Simpson grew up in Peoria, Illinois. He was one of six children, and his mother signed him up for riding lessons alongside his sister. He began riding when he was 11 years old at the Sangamon Pony Club. His first horse was Glenda Jo, a Thoroughbred mare. His mentors were George Morris, Rodney Jenkins and Bernie Traurig.

== Career ==
Simpson worked for Rodney Jenkins before setting out on his own in California. His business is based around riding, training and selling horses.

Simpson was the 2008 Olympics Show Jumping Team Gold Medalist, riding Carllson Vom Dach. Over his career, he has been a five-time World Cup finalist, the winner of over 75 Grand Prixs, and held the World Wall Record for ten years. He currently holds the North American High Jump Record.

== Personal life ==
Simpson is divorced and has two children, Sophie and Ty. He plays tennis, skis, and cooks.
