= Jill Henselwood =

Canadian equestrian (born 1962)

Personal information
- Nationality: Canada
- Discipline: Show jumping
- Born: November 1, 1962 (age 62); Ottawa, Ontario
- Height: 5 ft 6 in (1.68 m)
- Weight: 123 lb (56 kg; 8 st 11 lb)
Medal record
Olympic Games
Silver medal – second place	2008 Beijing	Team jumping
Pan American Games
Gold medal – first place	2007 Rio de Janeiro	Individual jumping

Jill Henselwood (born November 1, 1962) is a Canadian Equestrian Team member who competes in show jumping.

At the 2008 Summer Olympics in Beijing, Henselwood (riding her horse Special Ed) won the silver medal as part of the Canadian team in team jumping, together with teammates Mac Cone, Eric Lamaze, and Ian Millar.

She lives in Oxford Mills, Ontario.

Her horse, an Oldenburg gelding named Special Ed, was born in 1994 in Germany.
