= Lotta Schultz =

Swedish equestrian

Personal information
- Nationality: Swedish
- Born: 23 February 1968 (age 57); Uppsala, Sweden

Sport
- Sport: Equestrian

Lotta Schultz (born 23 February 1968) is a Swedish equestrian. She competed in two events at the 2008 Summer Olympics.
