= Huang Zuping =

Chinese equestrian

Huang Zuping (Chinese: 黄祖平; pinyin: Huáng Zǔpíng, born 1963-06-11) is an Olympic equestrian sportsman for China. His best performance is coming 6th place at the 2008 Germany Hagen Qualification. He will compete at the 2008 Summer Olympics in Beijing in the show jumping events.
