= Bernardo Alves =

Brazilian equestrian (born 1974)

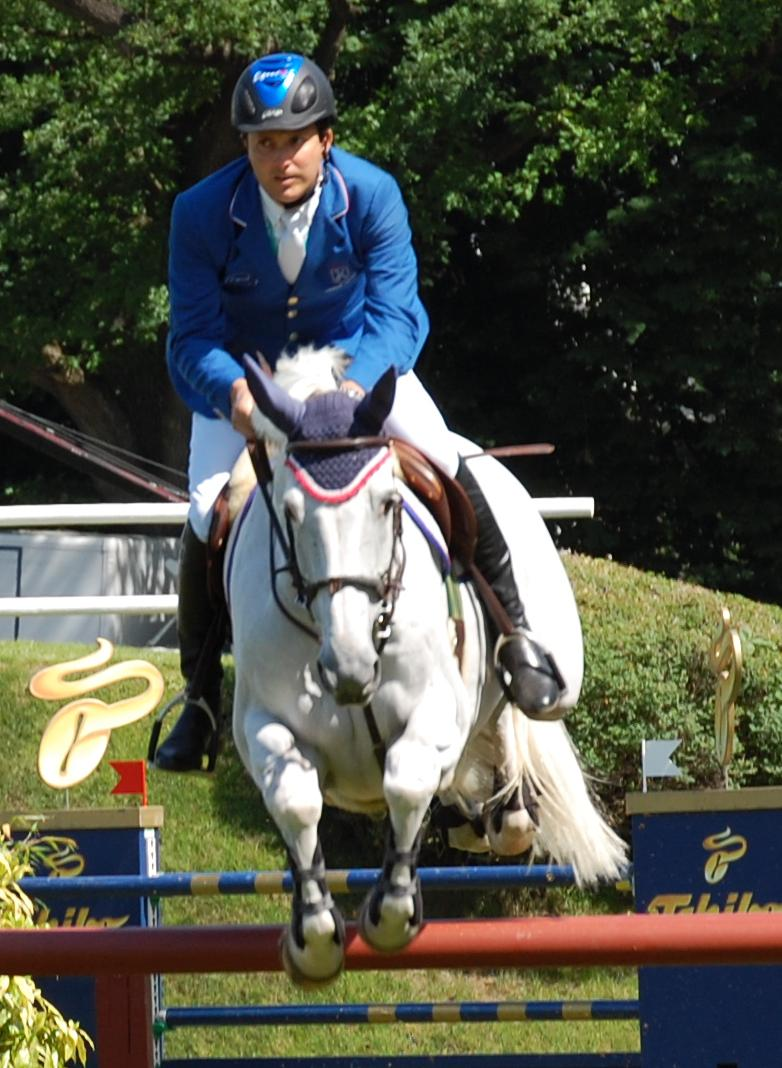
- Alves in 2011

Personal information
- Full name: Bernardo Cardoso de Resende Alves
- Discipline: Show jumping
- Born: 20 November 1974 (age 51); Belo Horizonte, Brazil
- Height: 1.86 m (6 ft 1 in)
- Weight: 76 kg (168 lb)
Medal record
Equestrian
Representing Brazil
Pan American Games
Gold medal – first place	1999 Winnipeg	Team jumping
Gold medal – first place	2007 Rio de Janeiro	Team jumping
Silver medal – second place	2011 Guadalajara	Team jumping
Bronze medal – third place	2003 Santo Domingo	Team jumping
Bronze medal – third place	2011 Guadalajara	Individual jumping

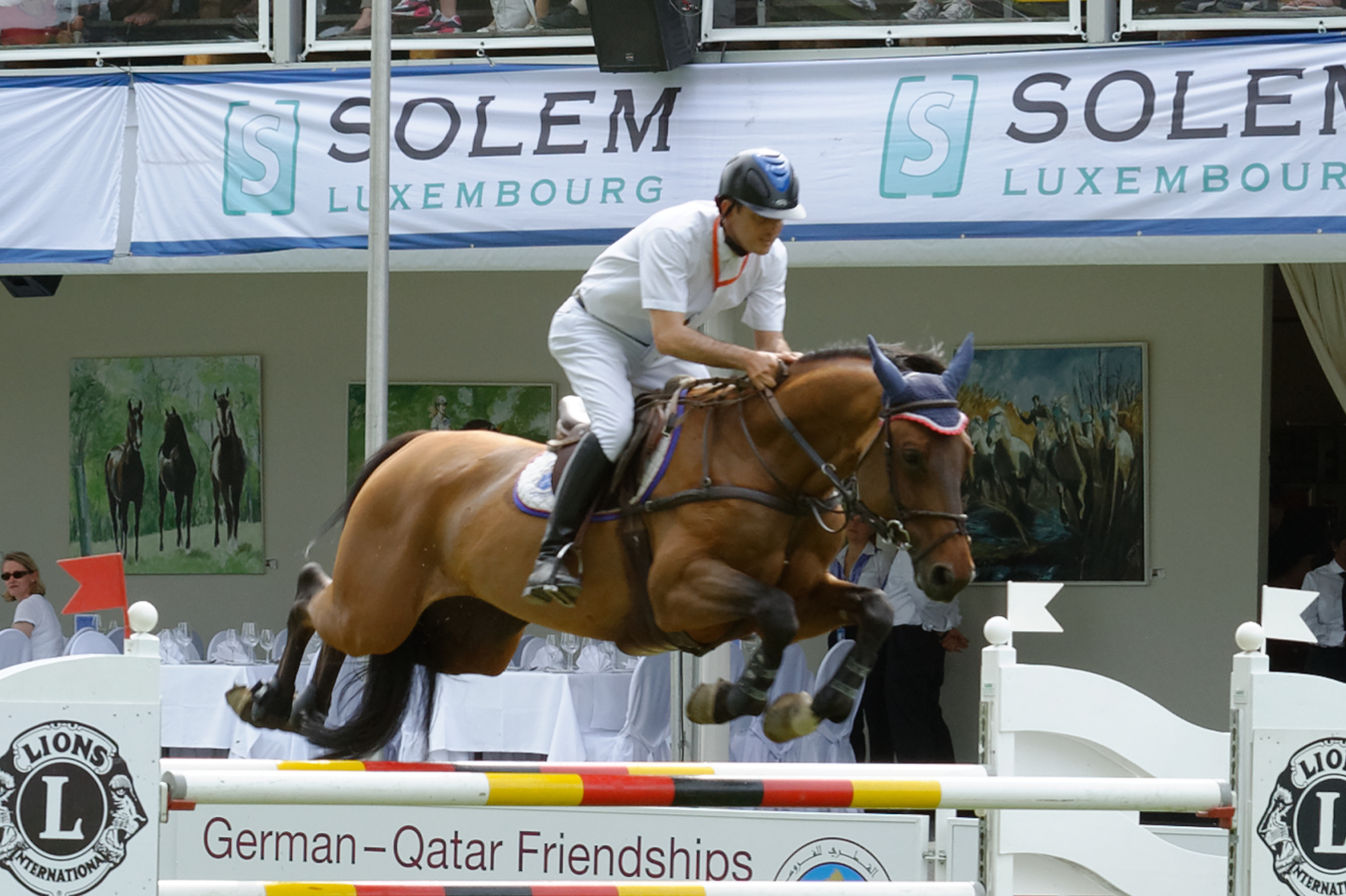
Internationales Pfingstturnier Wiesbaden 2014

Bernardo Cardoso de Resende Alves (born 20 November 1974, Belo Horizonte) is a Brazilian show jumping rider. He competed at the 2004 Summer Olympics and the 2008 Summer Olympics. In 2008, he was suspended after his horse was found to have a prohibited substance.

== Early life ==
He is the son of João Baptista Ribeiro de Resende Alves and Maria José Cardoso. His interest in the sport of show jumping began at age four on a visit to a farm. He began to learn the sport at this age under the instruction of Joseph Wilson. His first attempts were troubled as he took many falls, but he was determined and his trainer saw in him a lot of potential. By the age of eight, his determination noticeably paid off, as he won his first title and graduated to the tutelage of Vitor Alves Teixeira. By the age of 16, he was competing in the professional class. In May 2001, he trained for three months at the school of Nelson Pessoa in Belgium. This prepared him for his debut at the CHIO Aachen.

== Career highlights ==
- 2002
  - Bronze medal for Brazil, World Championship of Young Horses
- 2003
  - Voted the best rider of the CSI-W Mechelen, Belgium
  - 3rd place in Grand Prix CSI-A La Coruna, Spain
- 2004
  - 2nd place in the Grand Prix World Cup CSI-W Vigo, Spain
  - 1st place in Grand Prix CSI Bois-le-Roi, France
  - Bronze Medal (team) at the Pan American Games
  - 1st place in the King's Cup CSI-A Madrid
  - 2nd place in Grand Prix CSI-A Monte Carlo
  - 1st place in the IXth Grand Prix CSI Vejer de la Frontera
- 2009
  - 24–29 May: Winner of the Grand Prix of the Global Champions Tour's phase in Hamburg
