= Zhao Zhiwen =

Chinese show jumper

Zhao Zhiwen (born 27 November 1983 in Nantong) is an Olympic equestrian sportsman for China. His best performance is winning gold at the 2005 National Games - team jumping event. He will compete at the 2008 Summer Olympics in Beijing in the show jumping events.

Games	Discipline (Sport) / Event	NOC / Team	Pos	Medal	As
2008 Summer Olympics	Equestrian Jumping (Equestrian)	People's Republic of China			Zhao Zhiwen
	Jumping, Individual, Open (Olympic)	Tadonia	AC r1/2		
	Jumping, Team, Open (Olympic)	People's Republic of China	14 r2/3		
