= Matt Williams (equestrian) =

Australian equestrian (born 1985)

Personal information
- Full name: Matthew Williams
- Nationality: Australia
- Discipline: Show jumping
- Born: 9 May 1985 (age 40); Noble Park, Australia
- Height: 5 ft 10 in (1.78 m)
- Weight: 159 lb (72 kg; 11 st 5 lb)

Matt Williams (born 9 May 1985 in Melbourne, Victoria, Australia) is an Australian equestrian who competes in the sport of show jumping. Williams appeared at three Olympic Games, at the 2008 Summer Olympics, the 2012 Summer Olympics and the 2016 Summer Olympics.

Williams was brought up in Tonimbuk, Victoria and began riding at the age of three. He was introduced to the sport by his father, who had also been a show jumper. At the age of 18, Williams left Australia to ride in Europe.

At the 2008 Summer Olympics, he was the youngest Australian equestrian to have competed for Australia. In Beijing, he came in 21st individually and 7th with the Australian team.

He also appeared at the 2012 Summer Olympics. At the 2016 Summer Olympics competed with the horse Valinski S.
