= Camila Benedicto =

Brazilian equestrian

Personal information
- Born: 7 December 1977 (age 47); São Paulo, Brazil

Sport
- Sport: Equestrian

Camila Benedicto (born 7 December 1977) is a Brazilian equestrian. She competed in two events at the 2008 Summer Olympics.
