= Laurie Lever =

Australian equestrian

Laurie Lever (born 12 October 1947 in Manchester, England) is an Olympic-level equestrian rider, who competes for Australia. He was selected for the 2008 Summer Olympics at the age of 60, making him the oldest member of Australia's 2008 team and one of the oldest people to make an Olympic debut. He competed in jumping at Beijing aboard Ashleigh Drossel Dan. He finished in 23rd position in the individual event, and 7th in the teams event.
