= Katie Laurie =

Australian Show jumper

Personal information
- Full name: Katie Ann Laurie
- Born: Katie Ann McVean; 29 May 1986 (age 40) Oxford, Oxfordshire, Great Britain

Sport
- Country: New Zealand (until 2019); Australia (from 2019)
- Sport: Equestrian
- Event: Show jumping

Katie Ann Laurie (née McVean, born 29 May 1986) is an Australian equestrian. She competed for New Zealand in show jumping at the 2008 Summer Olympics in Beijing.

Laurie became New Zealand's youngest showjumping equestrian when competing at the 2008 Summer Games. Her father Jeff McVean competed for Australia at the 1984 Summer Olympics and the 1988 Summer Olympics before moving to New Zealand in 1990. She started representing Australia following a dispute with Equestrian Sports New Zealand in 2017.

Laurie married her husband Jackson Laurie in 2014. They have a daughter Grace, born in 2015. They were based at Mystery Creek in Hamilton, New Zealand, before moving to Australia to a 1000-acre site in New England (New South Wales). They then moved to Alberta, Canada.

In June 2021, Laurie was announced as part of the Australian team to compete at the 2020 Summer Games in Tokyo, Laurie rode Casebrooke Lomond a 10-year old whom she has ridden since he was 3. She was not able to progress to the final.
