= Rob Ehrens =

Dutch equestrian

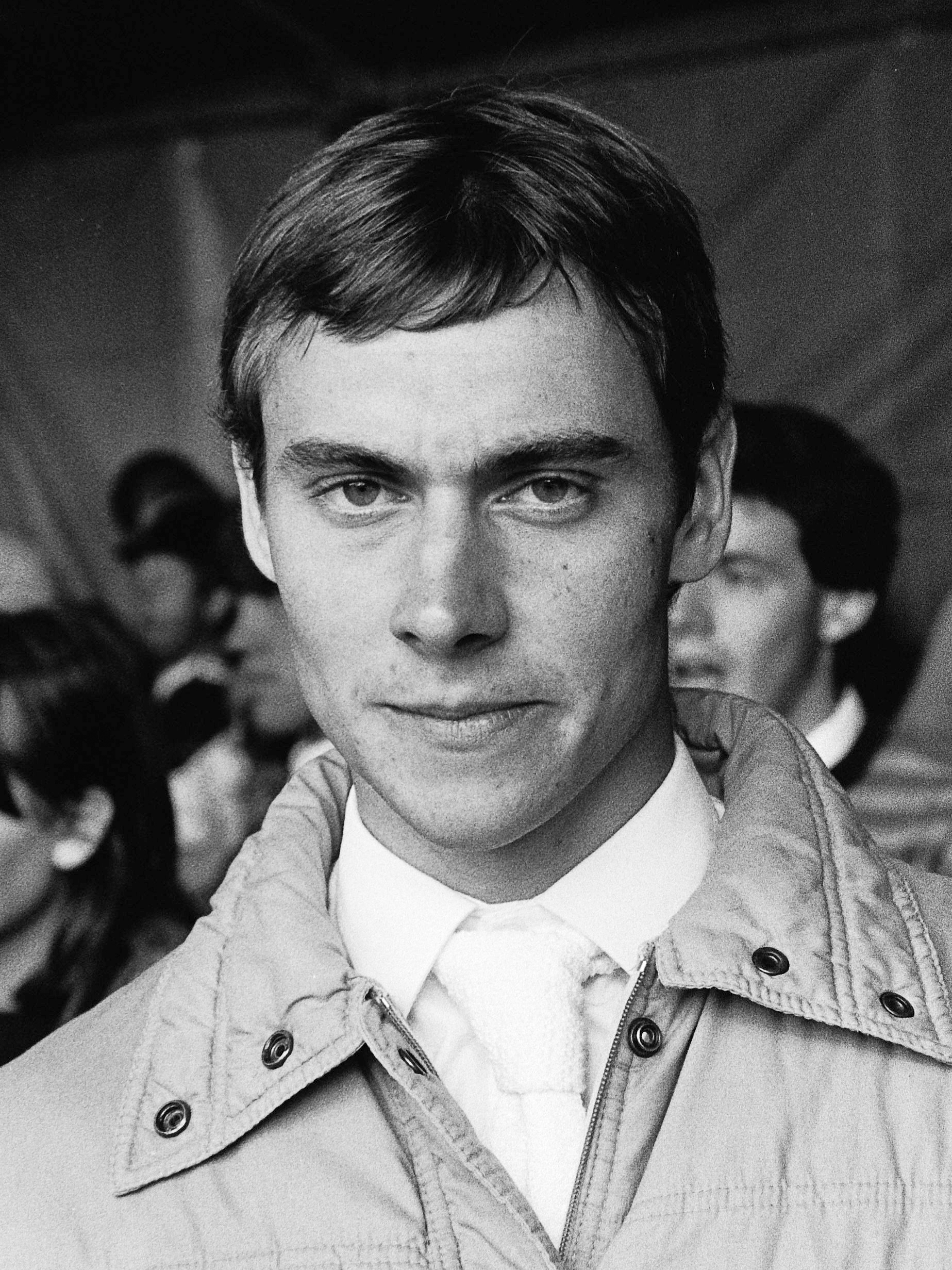
- Rob Ehrens in 1980

Personal information
- Nationality: Dutch
- Born: 30 October 1957 (age 68) Echt, Netherlands

Sport
- Sport: Equestrian

Rob Ehrens (born 30 October 1957) is a Dutch equestrian. He competed in two events at the 1988 Summer Olympics.
