= Bruce Goodin =

New Zealand equestrian

Personal information
- Born: 10 November 1969 (age 56) Huntly, New Zealand

Sport
- Country: New Zealand
- Sport: Equestrian
- Event: Show jumping

Bruce Goodin (born 10 November 1969) is a New Zealand equestrian. He competed in show jumping at the 1992, 2000, 2004, 2008, and at the 2020 Summer Olympics in Tokyo.

In 2024, Goodin suffered a broken neck vertebra during a showjumping event in Sweden.
