= Sharn Wordley =

New Zealand equestrian

Personal information
- Born: 8 June 1974 (age 52)

Sport
- Country: New Zealand
- Sport: Equestrian
- Event: Show jumping

Sharn Wordley (born 8 June 1974) is a New Zealand equestrian. He competed in show jumping at the 2008 Summer Olympics in Beijing.
