= Kirk Webby =

New Zealand equestrian

Personal information
- Born: 30 September 1970 (age 55)

Sport
- Country: New Zealand
- Sport: Equestrian
- Event: Show jumping

Kirk Webby (born 30 September 1970) is a New Zealand equestrian. He competed in show jumping at the 2008 Summer Olympics in Beijing. Webby was a reserve for the New Zealand Olympic equestrian team and he and his horse were called up when Daniel Meech's horse Sorbas was ruled out due to injury.
