= CSIO Spruce Meadows 'Masters' Tournament =

Equestrian show jumping event

The CSIO Spruce Meadows' 'Masters' Tournament is an annual fall equestrian show jumping event held at Spruce Meadows in Calgary, Alberta, presented by Rolex as of 2022. It is highlighted by the BMO Financial Group Nations' Cup which offers a C$350,000 purse and is notable as the "richest team show jumping event in the world", as well as by the $3,000,000 CPKC International Grand Prix presented by ROLEX.

Total purse amounts for the Spruce Meadows 'Masters' amount to over $4 million, making it the richest show jumping event in the world.

Historically, Great Britain currently holds more Nation's Cup titles at Spruce Meadows than any other nation with 10 victories out of the past 29. The 2006 victory by Canada marks the first time the home team has won a nation's cup at the Masters Tournament.

== BMO Financial Group Nation's Cup Past Winners ==
Year	Nation	Anchor	Anchor Horse	Total Faults	Runner up Nation	Total Faults	Third place Nation	Total Faults
2015	Brazil	Rodrigo Pessoa	Status	13	France	16	Canada	24
2014	Canada	Eric Lamaze	Zigali P.S.	9	United States	13	Belgium	21
2013	Germany	Hans Dieter Dreher	Colore	8* (0)	Belgium	8 (4)	France	8 (4)
2012	Germany	Christian Ahlmann	Taloubet Z	17	Ireland	22	Netherlands	25
2011	France	Roger-Yves Bost	Ideal de la Loge	18	Canada	21	Switzerland	25
2010	United States			17	Ireland	21	Canada	25
2009	Netherlands			1	United States	12	Mexico	14
2008	United States			4	Netherlands, Canada and Germany			8
2007	Germany	Christian Ahlmann	Cöster	12* (0)	Netherlands	12 (4)	Canada	13
2006	Canada	Ian Millar	In Style	10* (4)	Great Britain	10 (8)	United States	16
2004	Germany							
2003	Germany							
2002	United States			20	Germany	32	Switzerland	35
2001	Ireland				United States			
2000	Ireland							
1999	Germany							
1998	Germany							
1997	Netherlands							
1996	Great Britain							
1995	Ireland							
1994	United States							
1993	France							

* Denotes win by jump-off with the bracketed numbers indicating faults taken during jump-off

- The 2005 competition failed to yield results due to heavy rains.

=== 2006 Nation's Cup Results ===
Despite taking only a mere six faults up to the final round, Great Britain created a jump-off situation during their final ride as their squad gained four faults to equal Canada's ten. The competition then culminated in a thrilling jump-off between the two teams as anchor riders Michael Whitaker and Ian Millar were selected to represent their respective teams. Despite faulting for the first time that day, it was Canada's Ian Millar riding eleven-year-old gelding In Style who ensured Canada's first victory at this tournament. Taking the bronze was United States' national team, who rode strongly; taking only sixteen faults. The remaining rankings saw Germany take fourth place, the Netherlands achieving fifth place, and Belgium finishing in sixth.

Despite fairly warm temperatures and windy afternoon showers, attendance at the 2006 Nation's cup final held Saturday, September 9, approximated 60 870; a single day record for Spruce Meadows.

== Masters Grand Prix ==
The Masters tournament culminates with one of the top Grands Prix in the world of show jumping: the $1 Million CN International Grand Prix (formerly known as the du Maurier Limited International Grand Prix)

=== CP International Grand Prix Past Winners ===
- 2025 Scott Brash GBR and Hello Jefferson
- 2024 Martin Fuchs SWI and Leone Jei
- 2023 Martin Fuchs SWI and Leone Jei
- 2022 Daniel Deusser DEU and Killer Queen
- 2021 Steve Guerdat SWI and Venard de Cerisy
- 2020 Not run due to Covid-19
- 2019 Beezie Madden USA and Darry Lou
- 2018 Sameh El Dahan EGY and Suma's Zorro
- 2017 Philipp Weishaupt DEU and LB Convall
- 2016 Scott Brash GBR and Ursula XII
- 2015 Scott Brash GBR and Hello Sanctos
- 2014 Ian Millar CAN and Dixson
- 2013 Pieter Devos BEL and Candy
- 2012 Olivier Philippaerts BEL and Cabrio Van De Heffinck
- 2011 Eric Lamaze CAN and Hickstead
- 2010 Jeroen Dubbeldam NED and Simon
- 2009 McLain Ward USA and Sapphire
- 2008 Nick Skelton GBR and Arko III
- 2007 Eric Lamaze CAN and Hickstead
- 2006 Eugenie Angot FRA and Cigale du Tallis
- 2005 Beezie Madden USA and Judgement
- 2004 Jos Lansink BEL and Cumano
- 2003 Otto Becker DEU and Dobels Cento
- 2002 Ludger Beerbaum DEU and Goldfever 3
- 2001 Rodrigo Pessoa BRA and Gandini Lianos
- 2000 Rodrigo Pessoa BRA and Gandini Lianos
- 1999 Rene Tebbel DEU and Radiator
- 1998 Nick Skelton GBR and Virtual Village Hopes Are High
- 1997 Leslie Burr-Howard USA and S'Blieft
- 1996 Peter Charles IRL and La Ina
- 1995 Michael Whitaker GBR and Everest Two-Step
- 1994 John Whitaker GBR and Everest Grannusch
- 1993 Nick Skelton GBR and Everest Dollar Girl
- 1992 John Whitaker GBR and Henderson Gammon
- 1991 Ian Millar CAN and Big Ben
- 1990 Otto Becker DEU and Optibeurs Pamina
- 1989 Michael Whitaker GBR and Next Mon Santa
- 1988 George Morris USA and Rio
- 1987 Ian Millar CAN and Big Ben
- 1986 John Whitaker GBR and Next Milton
- 1985 Nick Skelton GBR and Everest St. James
- 1984 Heidi Robbiani CH and Jessica V
- 1983 Norman Dello Joio USA and I Love You
- 1982 Malcolm Pyrah GBR and Towerlands Anglezarke
- 1981 David Broome GBR and Queens Way Philco
- 1980 Rob Ehrens NED and Koh i Noor
- 1979 Eddie Macken IRL and Carroll's Boomerang
- 1978 Caroline Bradley GBR and Tigre
- 1977 John Simpson CAN and Texas
- 1976 Michael Vaillancourt CAN and Branch County

* Results courtesy of the Spruce Meadows secretary.
