= FEI World Cup Jumping 2008/2009 =

The FEI World Cup Jumping 2008–09 was the 31st edition of the premier international show jumping competition run by the FEI. The final, held at the Thomas & Mack Center in Las Vegas, Nevada from April 15, 2009, to April 19, 2009, was won by Meredith Michaels-Beerbaum of Germany, who was the defending champion, having won the final the previous year (2007–08) in Gothenburg, Sweden.

== Arab League ==
Location	Dates	Event	Winner
Tripoli, Libya	October 17, 2008 – October 20, 2008	CSI-W	cancelled
Alexandria, Egypt	November 6, 2008 – November 9, 2008	CSI*-W	cancelled
Alexandria, Egypt	November 13, 2008 – November 16, 2008	CSI*-W	cancelled
Doha, Qatar	December 11, 2008 – December 14, 2008	CSI***-W	(Saudi Arabia) HRH Prince Abdullah Bin Metab Al-Saud on Obelix
Doha, Qatar	December 18, 2008 – December 21, 2008	CSI****-W	(United Arab Emirates) Abdullah Mohd Al-Marri on Vallee d'Alezan van den Blauwaert
Dubai, United Arab Emirates	January 8, 2009 – January 10, 2009	CSI***-W	(Saudi Arabia) Ramzy Hamad Al-Duhami on Riverstone
Sharjah, United Arab Emirates	January 22, 2009 – January 24, 2009	CSI**-W	(Saudi Arabia) HRH Prince Abdullah Bin Metab Al-Saud on Obelix
Abu Dhabi, United Arab Emirates	January 15, 2009 – January 17, 2009	CSI**-W	(Saudi Arabia) Khaled Abdulaziz Al-Eid on Ayriyadh

== Caucasian League ==
Location	Dates	Event	Winner
(Georgia (country)) Tbilisi, Georgia	October 9, 2008 – October 12, 2008	CSI**-W	cancelled
Baku, Azerbaijan	October 18, 2008 – October 21, 2008	CSIO*-W	cancelled
Baku, Azerbaijan	October 25, 2008 – November 2, 2008	CSI**-W	cancelled

== Central Asian League ==
Location	Dates	Event	Winner
Bishkek, Kyrgyzstan	May 22, 2008 – May 25, 2008	CSIO**-W	(Kazakhstan) Yegor Morotskiy on Graf-Grannus N.P.
Tashkent, Uzbekistan	June 12, 2008 – June 15, 2008	CSIO**-W	(Uzbekistan) Gairat Nazarov on Sanaslan
Astana, Kazakhstan	July 1, 2008 – July 5, 2008	CSIO**-W	(Uzbekistan) Umid Kamilov on Rio-Sakramento

== Central European League ==
=== North Sub-League ===
Location	Dates	Event	Winner
Chernyakhovsk, Russia	May 23, 2008 – May 25, 2008	CSI***-W	(Estonia) Tiit Kivisild on Cinnamon
Bucharest, Romania	May 30, 2008 – June 1, 2008	CSIO****-W	(Germany) Martin Schäufler on Levis 23
Vilnius, Lithuania	May 30, 2008 – June 1, 2008	CSI**-W	(Russia) Vladimir Beletskiy on Larkanaro
Piatra Neamţ, Romania	June 6, 2008 – June 8, 2008	CSI***-W	(Hungary) Zoltán Czékus on Karina
Tallinn, Estonia	July 10, 2008 – July 13, 2008	CSIO****-W	(Italy) Emanuele Gaudiano on Uppercut DS
Riga, Latvia	July 18, 2008 – July 20, 2008	CSI**-W	(Russia) Arseny Shpakonskiy on Campino 51
Prague, Czech Republic	September 11, 2008 – September 14, 2008	CSIO****-W	(Italy) Emanuele Gaudiano on Uppercut DS
Moscow, Russia	September 19, 2008 – September 21, 2008	CSI***-W	(Russia) Artur Bagdasaryan on Konkord
Tallinn, Estonia	October 3, 2008 – October 5, 2008	CSI**-W	(Estonia) Hanno Ellermann on Poncorde
Leszno, Poland	November 13, 2008 – November 16, 2008	CSI***-W	(Denmark) Andreas Schou on Chicago
Poznań, Poland	February 13, 2009 – February 15, 2009	CSI**-W	(Estonia) Rein Pill on A Big Boy
Brno, Czech Republic	February 22, 2009 – February 24, 2009	CSI**-W	(Netherlands) Peter Geerink on Scotch

=== South Sub-League ===
Location	Dates	Event	Winner
Kiskunhalas, Hungary	May 1, 2008 – May 4, 2008	CSIO****-W	(Hungary) Jamie Wingrave on Agropoint Calira
Athens, Greece	May 30, 2008 – June 1, 2008	CSI***-W	(Greece) Elina Dendrinou on W.K. Liberty 0000
Sofia, Bulgaria	June 13, 2008 – June 15, 2008	CSIO****-W	(Bulgaria) Angel Niagolov on Rue Blanche du Gibet
Albena, Bulgaria	June 20, 2008 – June 22, 2008	CSI***-W	(Bulgaria) Samantha McIntosh on Equitta
Istanbul, Turkey	June 27, 2008 – June 29, 2008	CSIO****-W	(Greece) György Körmendy on Siljona B
Bratislava, Slovakia	July 24, 2008 – July 27, 2008	CSIO****-W	(Finland) Piia Pantsu on Chauvinist
Lipica, Slovenia	August 29, 2008 – August 31, 2008	CSI**-W	(Italy) Davide Kainich on Merveille de Muze
Ugar, Ribnica, Slovenia	September 19, 2008 – September 21, 2008	CSI***-W	(France) Kevin Staut on Le Prestige St Lois
Zagreb, Croatia	September 25, 2008 – September 28, 2008	CSIO****-W	(Switzerland) Manfred Müller on Cheenook's Boy CH
Athens, Greece	October 2, 2008 – October 5, 2008	CSIO****-W	(Italy) Emanuele Gaudiano on Uppercut DS
Budapest, Hungary	December 5, 2008 – December 7, 2008	CSI***-W	(Switzerland) Willi Melliger on Lea C

=== Final ===
Location	Dates	Event	Winner
Warsaw, Poland	March 20, 2009 – March 22, 2009	CSI-W	(Poland) Msciwoj Kiecon on Urbane

== Japan League ==
Location	Dates	Event	Winner
Osaka, Japan	April 5, 2008	CSI*-W	(Japan) Satoshi Hirao on Udaryllis
Tochigi, Japan	May 25, 2008	CSI*-W	(Japan) Tadahiro Hayashi on Beleno
Osaka, Japan	June 22, 2008	CSI*-W	(Japan) Daisuke Fukushima on Royal Selections
Minamisōma, Japan	July 6, 2008	CSI*-W	(Japan) Tadayoshi Hayashi on Telexio
Gotemba, Japan	September 7, 2008	CSI*-W	(Japan) Ryuma Hirota on Zero
Gotemba, Japan	October 18, 2008	CSI*-W	(Japan) Takamichi Mashiyama on Top Gear I
Osaka, Japan	October 25, 2008	CSI*-W	(Japan) Daisuke Kawaguchi on Snowyriver II

== Mexican League ==
Location	Dates	Event	Winner
Monterrey, Mexico	October 14, 2008 – October 26, 2008	CSI****-W	(Mexico) Alberto Michan Halbinger on Lavita
Balvanera, Corregidora, Mexico	November 23, 2008	CSI-W	(Puerto Rico) Francis Tress Roig on Lady in Blue
Balvanera, Corregidora, Mexico	March 6, 2009	CSI*-W	(Mexico) Antonio Maurer on As Hyo Hugo

== North American League ==
=== Canada ===
Location	Dates	Event	Winner
Langley, British Columbia, Canada	May 28, 2008 – May 31, 2008	CSI**-W	(United States) Kyle King on Capone I
Blainville, Quebec, Canada	June 9, 2008 – June 13, 2008	CSI**-W	(United States) Alison Robitaille on Intrépide du Valon
Bromont, Quebec, Canada	June 16, 2008 – June 20, 2008	CSI***-W	(United States) Todd Minikus on Pavarotti
Palgrave, Ontario, Canada	June 30, 2008 – August 3, 2008	CSI***-W	(Canada) Eric Lamaze on Tempete van het Lindehof
Palgrave, Ontario, Canada	September 19, 2008 – September 21, 2008	CSI***-W	(Canada) Ian Millar on In Style
Toronto, Ontario, Canada	November 7, 2008 – November 15, 2008	CSI****-W	(Canada) Eric Lamaze on Hickstead

=== United States East Coast ===
Location	Dates	Event	Winner
Bridgehampton, New York, United States	August 24, 2008 – August 31, 2008	CSI****-W	(United States) Hillary Dobbs on Corlett
Chagrin Falls, Ohio, United States	September 17, 2008 – September 21, 2008	CSI***-W	(United States) Norman Dello Joio on Malcolm
Lexington, Kentucky, United States	September 26, 2008 – September 27, 2008	CSI**-W	(United States) Kent Farrington on Up Chiqui
Harrisburg, Pennsylvania, United States	October 16, 2008 – October 18, 2008	CSI**-W	(United States) Kent Farrington on Up Chiqui
Washington, D.C., United States	October 21, 2008 – October 26, 2008	CSI***-W	(United States) McLain Ward on Sapphire
Syracuse, New York, United States	October 29, 2008 – November 2, 2008	CSI****-W	(United States) Christine McCrea on Vegas
Wellington, Florida, United States	December 4, 2008 – December 7, 2008	CSI***-W	(United States) Kent Farrington on Up Chiqui
Green Cove Springs, Florida, United States	January 14, 2009 – January 17, 2009	CSI***-W	(Brazil) Rodrigo Pessoa on Let's Fly
Wellington, Florida, United States	February 4, 2009 – February 8, 2009	CSI***-W	(Brazil) Rodrigo Pessoa on Rufus
Wellington, Florida, United States	March 4, 2009 – March 8, 2009	CSI****-W	(United States) McLain Ward on Sapphire
Tampa, Florida, United States	March 18, 2009 – March 22, 2009	CSI**-W	(United States) Kent Farrington on Up Chiqui

=== United States West Coast ===
Location	Dates	Event	Winner
Del Mar, California, United States	August 27, 2008 – August 31, 2008	CSI**-W	(Iran) Ali Nilforushan on Warco van de Halhoeve
San Juan Capistrano, California, United States	September 10, 2008 – September 14, 2008	CSI**-W	(United States) Karl Cook on Carlos
Burbank, California, United States	September 17, 2008 – September 21, 2008	CSI**-W	(United States) Macella O'Neill on Rockstar
Las Vegas, Nevada, United States	October 29, 2008 – November 2, 2008	CSI**-W	(Iran) Ali Nilforushan on Warco van de Halhoeve
Rancho Murieta, California, United States	November 6, 2008 – November 9, 2008	CSI***-W	(Australia) Harley Brown on Cassiato
Burbank, California, United States	November 12, 2008 – November 16, 2008	CSI**-W	(United States) Will Simpson on Archie Bunker
Thermal, California, United States	January 27, 2009 – February 1, 2009	CSI**-W	(United States) Mandy Porter on San Diego
Thermal, California, United States	February 3, 2009 – February 8, 2009	CSI**-W	(United States) Will Simpson on Archie Bunker
Thermal, California, United States	February 17, 2009 – February 22, 2009	CSI**-W	(United States) Ashlee Bond on Cadett 7
Thermal, California, United States	March 3, 2009 – March 8, 2009	CSI**-W	(United States) Ashlee Bond on Cadett 7
San Juan Capistrano, California, United States	March 25, 2009 – March 29, 2009	CSI**-W	(United States) Mandy Porter on San Diego

== Pacific League ==
=== Australia ===
Location	Dates	Event	Winner
Sydney, Australia	March 27, 2008	CSI*-W	(Australia) Adam Mellers on Animate
Toowoomba, Australia	August 3, 2008	CSI*-W	(Australia) Clem Smith on Benaloo Dark Ages
Brisbane, Australia	August 12, 2008	CSI*-W	(Australia) Robert Goodwin on Sandon
Caboolture, Australia	August 17, 2008	CSI*-W	(Australia) Amy Graham on Transatlantic
Gawler, Australia	August 31, 2008	CSI*-W	(Australia) Julia Hargreaves on Hmen Pierville
Adelaide, Australia	September 11, 2008	CSI*-W	(Australia) Clem Smith on Dark Ages
Glenelg, Australia	September 14, 2008	CSI*-W	(Australia) Amy Graham on Transatlantic
Melbourne, Australia	September 21, 2008	CSI*-W	(Australia) Wendy Schaeffer on Koyuna Sun Set
Perth, Australia	September 29, 2008	CSI*-W	(Australia) David Dobson on Pico Bello
Brigadoon, Australia	October 18, 2008	CSI*-W	(Australia) Linda Dobson on Argyle Stables Indigo
Shepparton, Australia	November 9, 2008	CSI*-W	(Australia) Jamie Winning on Vangelo des Hazalles
Wodonga, Australia	November 15, 2008	CSI*-W	(Australia) Chris Chugg on Vivant
Melbourne, Australia	November 20, 2008 – November 23, 2008	CSI*-W	(Australia) Laurie Lever on Ashleigh Drossel Dan
Sale, Australia	November 30, 2008	CSI*-W	(Australia) Laurie Lever on Ashleigh Drossel Dan
Sydney, Australia	December 14, 2008	CSI*-W	(Australia) Rebecca Allen on Ted

=== New Zealand ===
Location	Dates	Event	Winner
Hastings, New Zealand	October 22, 2008 – October 24, 2008	CSI*-W	(New Zealand) Simon Wilson on Right Royal
Cambridge, New Zealand	November 8, 2008 – November 9, 2008	CSI*-W	(New Zealand) Maurice Beatson on My Gollywog
Tauranga, New Zealand	December 5, 2008 – December 7, 2008	CSI*-W	(New Zealand) Ike Unsworth on Seremonie VDL
Taupō, New Zealand	December 18, 2008 – December 21, 2008	CSI*-W	(New Zealand) Anna Trent on Muskateer NZPH
Dannevirke, New Zealand	January 3, 2009 – January 4, 2009	CSI*-W	(New Zealand) Claire Wilson on Answer Back
Waitemata City, New Zealand	January 10, 2009 – January 11, 2009	CSI*-W	(New Zealand) Anna Trent on Muskateer NZPH
Gisborne, New Zealand	January 14, 2009 – January 25, 2009	CSI*-W	(New Zealand) Simon Wilson on Right Royal
Gisborne, New Zealand (League Final)	January 14, 2009 – January 25, 2009	CSI*-W	(New Zealand) Bernard Denton on Suzuki

== South African League ==
Location	Dates	Event	Winner
Pietermaritzburg, South Africa	April 10, 2008 – April 13, 2008	CSI*-W	(South Africa) Lexi Carter on Pickpocket
Midrand, South Africa	May 29, 2008 – June 1, 2008	CSI*-W	(South Africa) Sean Henderson on Fact and Fancy
Port Elizabeth, South Africa	July 3, 2008 – July 6, 2008	CSI*-W	(South Africa) Nicola Sime-Nel on Sharp Colt
Pretoria, South Africa	August 29, 2008 – August 31, 2008	CSI*-W	(South Africa) Dominey Alexander on Capital Shiraz
Parys, South Africa	September 11, 2008 – September 14, 2008	CSI*-W	(South Africa) Sean Henderson on Fact and Fancy
Cape Town, South Africa	November 20, 2008 – November 23, 2008	CSI*-W	(South Africa) Gareth Neill on Something Special

== South American League ==
Location	Dates	Event	Winner
Porto Alegre, Brazil	May 8, 2008 – May 11, 2008	CSI***-W	(Brazil) Andre Luiz Martins dos Santos on Cardal Jmen
Buenos Aires, Argentina	May 15, 2008 – May 18, 2008	CSI*-W	(Chile) Carlos Milthaler on Cupido Z
São Paulo, Brazil	August 28, 2008 – August 31, 2008	CSI**-W	(Brazil) Francisco Mesquita Musa on Werca van het Guet
São Paulo, Brazil	September 3, 2008 – September 7, 2008	CSI**-W	(Brazil) Simone Machado Macedo dos Santos on Trivitano Miroflores
Haras El Capricho, Capilla del Señor, Argentina	November 12, 2008 – November 16, 2008	CSIO****-W	(Chile) Bernardo Naveillan on Marioso du Terral
Haras El Capricho, Capilla del Señor, Argentina	November 20, 2008 – November 23, 2008	CSI*-W	(Chile) Samuel Parot on Adventure Van Der Werf
Rio de Janeiro, Brazil (League Final)	November 27, 2008 – November 30, 2008	CSI**-W	(Brazil) Vitor Alves-Teixeira on Yuri Itapuã

== South East Asia League ==
Location	Dates	Event	Winner
Putrajaya, Malaysia	June 15, 2008	CSI*-W	(Sweden) Helena Gabrielsson on King Power Aladdin
Putrajaya, Malaysia	June 28, 2008	CSI*-W	(Sweden) Helena Gabrielsson on Nixon de la Tourette
Kuang, Malaysia	July 13, 2008	CSI*-W	(Malaysia) Qabil Ambak Mahamad Fathil on Parvina
Kuang, Malaysia	July 27, 2008	CSI*-W	(Sweden) Helena Gabrielsson on King Power Aladdin
Kuang, Malaysia	August 3, 2008	CSI*-W	(Malaysia) Qabil Ambak Mahamad Fathil on Amadeus van de Boswinning

== Western European League ==
Location	Dates	Event	Winner
Oslo, Norway	October 10, 2008 – October 12, 2008	CSI****-W	(Spain) Rutherford Latham on Guarana Champeix
Helsinki, Finland	October 16, 2008 – October 19, 2008	CSI****-W	(Netherlands) Gerco Schröder on Milano
Verona, Italy	November 6, 2008 – November 9, 2008	CSI****-W	(Germany) Alois Pollmann-Schweckhorst on Lord Luis
Stuttgart, Germany	November 19, 2008 – November 23, 2008	CSI*****-W	(Germany) Meredith Michaels-Beerbaum on Shutterfly
Geneva, Switzerland	December 11, 2008 – December 14, 2008	CSI*****-W	(Canada) Eric Lamaze on Hickstead
London, United Kingdom	December 18, 2008 – December 22, 2008	CSI*****-W	(Australia) Edwina Alexander on Itot du Chateau
Mechelen, Belgium	December 26, 2008 – December 30, 2008	CSI*****-W	(Belgium) Ludo Philippaerts on Winningmood
Leipzig, Germany	January 15, 2009 – January 18, 2009	CSI*****-W	(Republic of Ireland) Jessica Kürten on Libertina
Zürich, Switzerland	January 20, 2009 – January 25, 2009	CSI*****-W	(Republic of Ireland) Jessica Kürten on Libertina
Bordeaux, France	February 6, 2009 – February 8, 2009	CSI****-W	(Netherlands) Albert Zoer on Okidoki
Vigo, Spain	February 12, 2009 – February 15, 2009	CSI****-W	(Germany) Marco Kutscher on Cash
Gothenburg, Sweden	February 19, 2009 – February 22, 2009	CSI*****-W	(Sweden) Svante Johansson on Saint Amour
's-Hertogenbosch, Netherlands	March 19, 2009 – March 22, 2009	CSI****-W	(Switzerland) Daniel Etter on Peu a Peu

== World Cup Final ==
Location	Dates	Event	Winner
Las Vegas, Nevada, United States	April 15, 2009 – April 19, 2009	CSI-W Final	(Germany) Meredith Michaels-Beerbaum on Shutterfly
