= 2010 Spruce Meadows Masters =

The 2010 Spruce Meadows 'Masters' Tournament was the 2010 edition of the CSIO Spruce Meadows 'Masters' Tournament, the Canadian official show jumping horse show at Spruce Meadows (Calgary, Alberta). It was held as CSIO 5*.

With over $2 million in prize money it is the one-week horse show with the highest prize money in the world.

The first edition of the Spruce Meadows 'Masters' Tournament was held 35 years ago in 1976. The BMO Nations Cup, at this time the only outdoor Show Jumping Nations Cup in North America, is held since 1977.

The 2010 edition of the Spruce Meadows 'Masters' Tournament was held between September 8, 2010 and September 12, 2010.

== ENCANA Cup ==
The ENCANA Cup was the main show jumping competition of Friday, September 10, 2010 at 2010 Spruce Meadows 'Masters' Tournament. It was held at 4:15 pm. This competition was a show jumping competition with one round and one jump-off, the fences were up to 1.60 meters high.

It is endowed with Can$100,000.

	Rider	Horse	Round 1		jump-off		prize money
	Rider	Horse	Penalties	Time (s)	Penalties	Time (s)	prize money
1	(Belgium) Rik Hemeryck	Quarco de Kerambars	0	-	0	37.063	Can$25,000
2	(United States) Beezie Madden	Mademoiselle	0	-	0	38.898	Can$20,000
3	(Switzerland) Werner Muff	Quax II	0	-	4	40.470	Can$15,000
4	(Netherlands) Gerco Schröder	New Orleans	1	89.648			Can$10,000
5	(Mexico) Jaime Guerra	Watch me van het Grootveldhof	1	89.787			Can$7,000

(Top 5 of 19 Competitors)

== FEI Nations Cup of Canada ==
The BMO 2010 Nations Cup (FEI Nations Cup of Canada) was part of the 2010 Spruce Meadows Masters.

The competition was a show jumping competition with two rounds and optionally one jump-off. The fences were up to 1.60 meters high.

It was held on Saturday, September 11, 2010 at 12:00 pm. The competition was endowed with Can$350,000.

== CN International Grand Prix ==
The $1,000,000 CN International, the Show jumping Grand Prix of the 2010 Spruce Meadows 'Masters', was the major show jumping competition at this event. The sponsor of this competition was Canadian National Railway. It was held on Sunday, September 12, 2010.

The competition was a show jumping competition with two rounds and optionally one jump-off. The fences were up to 1.60 meters high. If two riders, which were not qualified for the jump-off, had the same number of faults after two rounds, the time of the first round would have counted for the position in the final ranking.

With a prize money of Can$1,000,000 it is, together with the Pfizer-1,000,000 US-$-Grand Prix in Saugerties, NY, USA (which was held at the same day), the show jumping competition with the highest prize money in the world.

	Rider	Horse	Round 1		Round 2		Total faults (Round 1 + Round 2)	Jump-off	
	Rider	Horse	Penalties	Time (s)	Penalties	Time (s)	Total faults (Round 1 + Round 2)	Penalties	Time (s)
1	(Netherlands) Jeroen Dubbeldam	Simon	0	88.175	1	73.900	1		
2	(United States) Richard Spooner	Cristallo	0	88.358	4	72.261	4		
3	(Canada) Eric Lamaze	Hickstead	0	86.243	7	84.218	7		
4	(Netherlands) Gerco Schröder	New Orleans	1	91.656	6	77.469	7		
5	(United Kingdom) Robert Smith	Talan	4	87.107	5	75.177	9		

(Top 5 of 31 Competitors)
