= 2011 Spruce Meadows Masters =

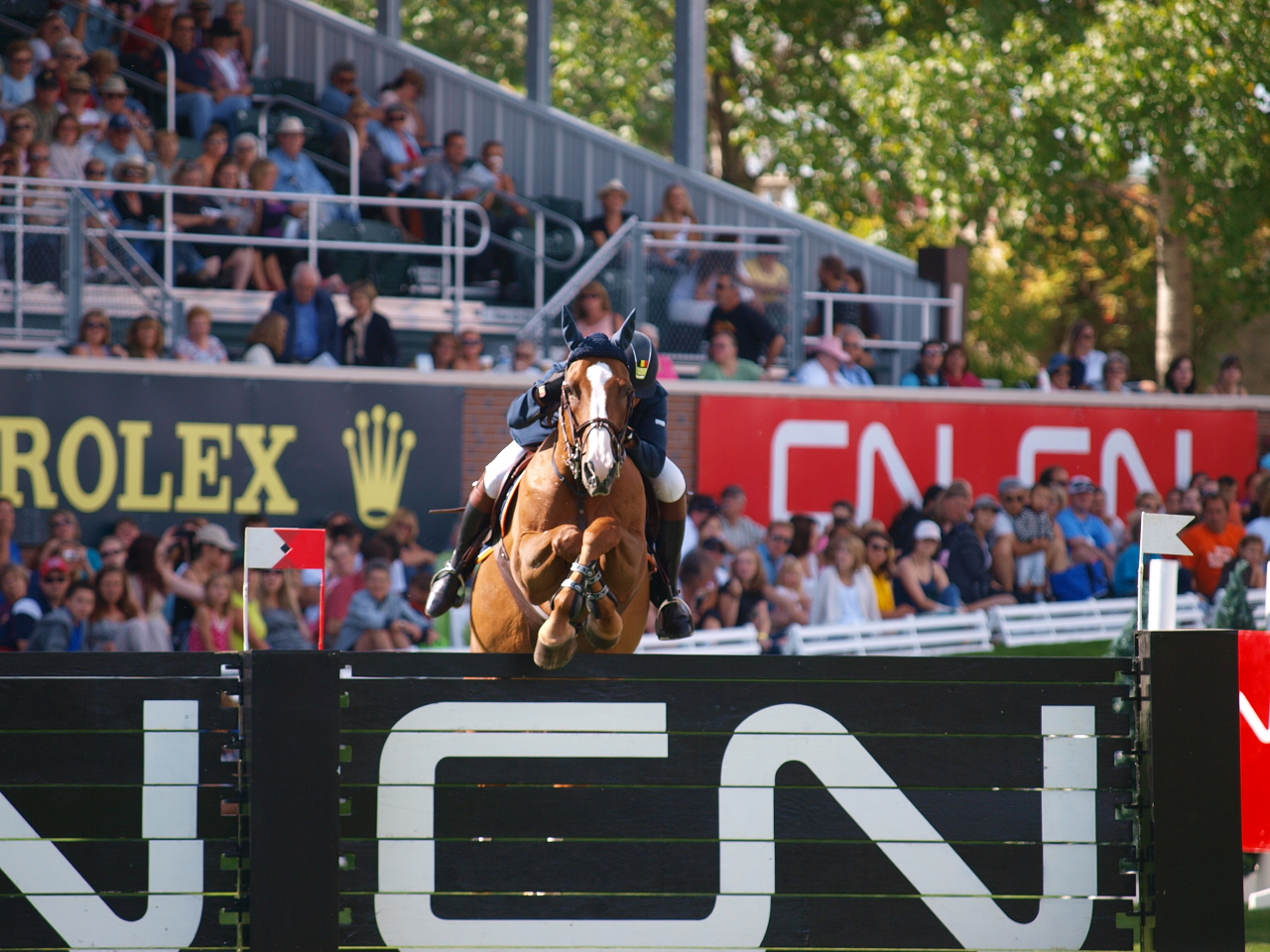
2011 Spruce Meadows Masters

The 2011 Spruce Meadows 'Masters' Tournament was the 2011 edition of the CSIO Spruce Meadows 'Masters' Tournament, the Canadian official show jumping horse show at Spruce Meadows (Calgary, Alberta). It is held as CSIO 5*.

With over $2 million in prize money, it was the one-week horse show with the highest prize money in the world.

The first edition of the Spruce Meadows 'Masters' Tournament was held 35 years ago in 1976. The BMO Nations Cup, at this time the only outdoor Show Jumping Nations Cup in North America, is held since 1977.

The 2011 edition of the Spruce Meadows 'Masters' Tournament was held between September 7, 2011 and September 12, 2011.

== ENCANA Cup ==
The ENCANA Cup was the main show jumping competition on Friday, September 9, 2011, at 2011 Spruce Meadows 'Masters' Tournament. It was held at 5:15 pm. This competition was a show jumping competition with one round and one jump-off, the fences were up to 1.60 meters high.

It was endowed with Can$100,000.

	Rider	Horse	Round 1		jump-off		prize money
	Rider	Horse	Penalties	Time (s)	Penalties	Time (s)	prize money
1	(United States) Lauren Hough	Blue Angel	0	-	0	43.52	Can$30,000
2	(Saudi Arabia) Kamal Bahamdan	Delphi	0	-	4	43.79	Can$20,000
3	(Canada) Tiffany Foster	Victor	0	-	8	42.47	Can$15,000
4	(Belgium) Niels Bruynseels	Conisha van de Helle	1	82.08			Can$10,000
5	(Netherlands) Gert-Jan Bruggink	Ulke	1	82.56			Can$6,000

(Top 5 of 25 Competitors)

== FEI Nations Cup of Canada ==
The BMO 2011 Nations Cup (FEI Nations Cup of Canada) was part of the 2011 Spruce Meadows Masters.

The competition was a show jumping competition with two rounds and optionally one jump-off. The fences were up to 1.60 meters high. It was held on Saturday, September 10, 2011 at 2:00 pm. The competition was endowed with Can$350,000.

== CN International Grand Prix ==
The $1,000,000 CN International, the Show jumping Grand Prix of the 2011 Spruce Meadows 'Masters', was the major show jumping competition at this event. The sponsor of this competition was Canadian National Railway. It was held on Sunday, September 11, 2011.

The competition had two rounds and optionally one jump-off. The fences were up to 1.60 meters high. If two riders, which were not qualified for the jump-off, had the same number of faults after two rounds, the time of the first round would have counted for the position in the final ranking.

With a prize money of Can$1,000,000 it is, behind the Grand Prix of Rio de Janeiro and before the Pfizer-1,000,000 US$-Grand Prix in Saugerties, NY, USA (which is held at the same day), the show jumping competition with the second highest prize money in the world.

	Rider	Horse	Round 1		Round 2		Total faults (Round 1 + Round 2)	Jump-off	
	Rider	Horse	Penalties	Time (s)	Penalties	Time (s)	Total faults (Round 1 + Round 2)	Penalties	Time (s)
1	(Canada) Eric Lamaze	Hickstead	0	-	0	66.41	0		
2	(Belgium) Niels Bruynseels	Nasa	4	-	0	67.72	4		
3	(Switzerland) Martin Fuchs	Principal	0	-	4	67.73	4		
4	(Saudi Arabia) Khaled Al Eid	Presley Boy	5	-	0	67.04	5		
5	(Mexico) Santiago Lambre	Wonami van den Aard	5	-	0	67.53	5		

(Top 5 of 35 Competitors)
