= Ludger Beerbaum =

German equestrian (born 1963)

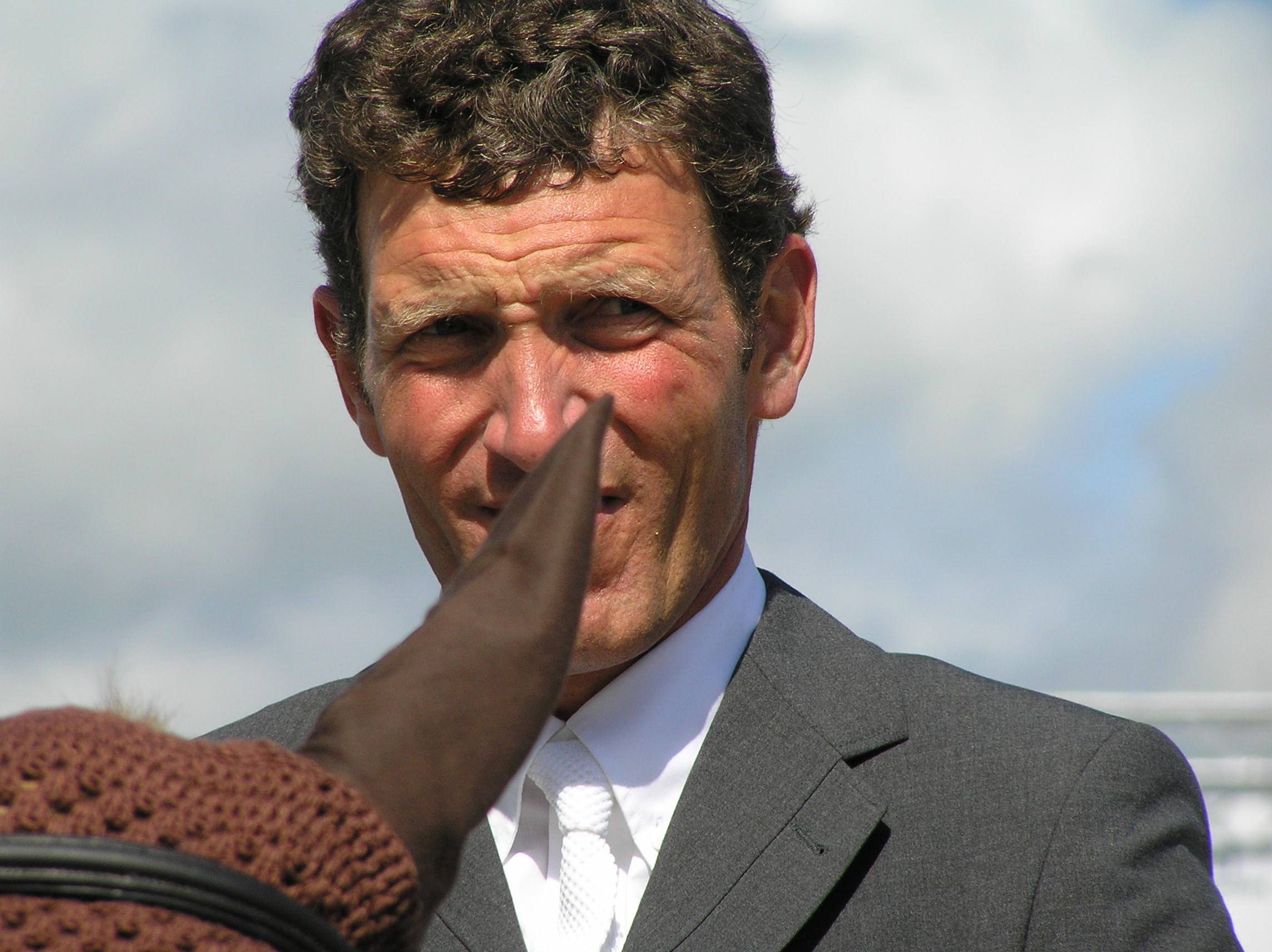

Personal information
- Nationality: Germany
- Discipline: Show jumping
- Born: 26 August 1963 (age 63); Detmold, West Germany
- Height: 6 ft 2 in (1.88 m)
- Weight: 176 lb (80 kg)
Medal record
Equestrian
Representing West Germany
Olympic Games
Gold medal – first place	1988 Seoul	Team jumping
World Championships
Silver medal – second place	1990 Stockholm	Team jumping
Representing Germany
Olympic Games
Gold medal – first place	1992 Barcelona	Individual jumping
Gold medal – first place	1996 Atlanta	Team jumping
Gold medal – first place	2000 Sydney	Team jumping
Disqualified	2004 Athens	Team jumping
Bronze medal – third place	2016 Rio de Janeiro	Team jumping
World Championships
Gold medal – first place	1994 The Hague	Team jumping
Gold medal – first place	1998 Rome	Team jumping
Bronze medal – third place	2006 Aachen	Team jumping
European Championships
Gold medal – first place	1997 Mannheim	Individual jumping
Gold medal – first place	1997 Mannheim	Team jumping
Gold medal – first place	1999 Hickstead	Team jumping
Gold medal – first place	2001 Arnhem	Individual jumping
Gold medal – first place	2003 Donaueschingen	Team jumping
Silver medal – second place	2003 Donaueschingen	Individual jumping
Silver medal – second place	2007 Mannheim	Team jumping
Silver medal – second place	2013 Herning	Team jumping
Silver medal – second place	2015 Aachen	Team jumping
Bronze medal – third place	2001 Arnhem	Team jumping
Bronze medal – third place	2007 Mannheim	Individual jumping
World Cup
Gold medal – first place	1993 Gothenburg	Individual jumping
Silver medal – second place	2002 Leipzig	Individual jumping
Silver medal – second place	2010 Geneva	Individual jumping
Silver medal – second place	2014 Lyon	Individual jumping
Bronze medal – third place	1998 Helsinki	Individual jumping

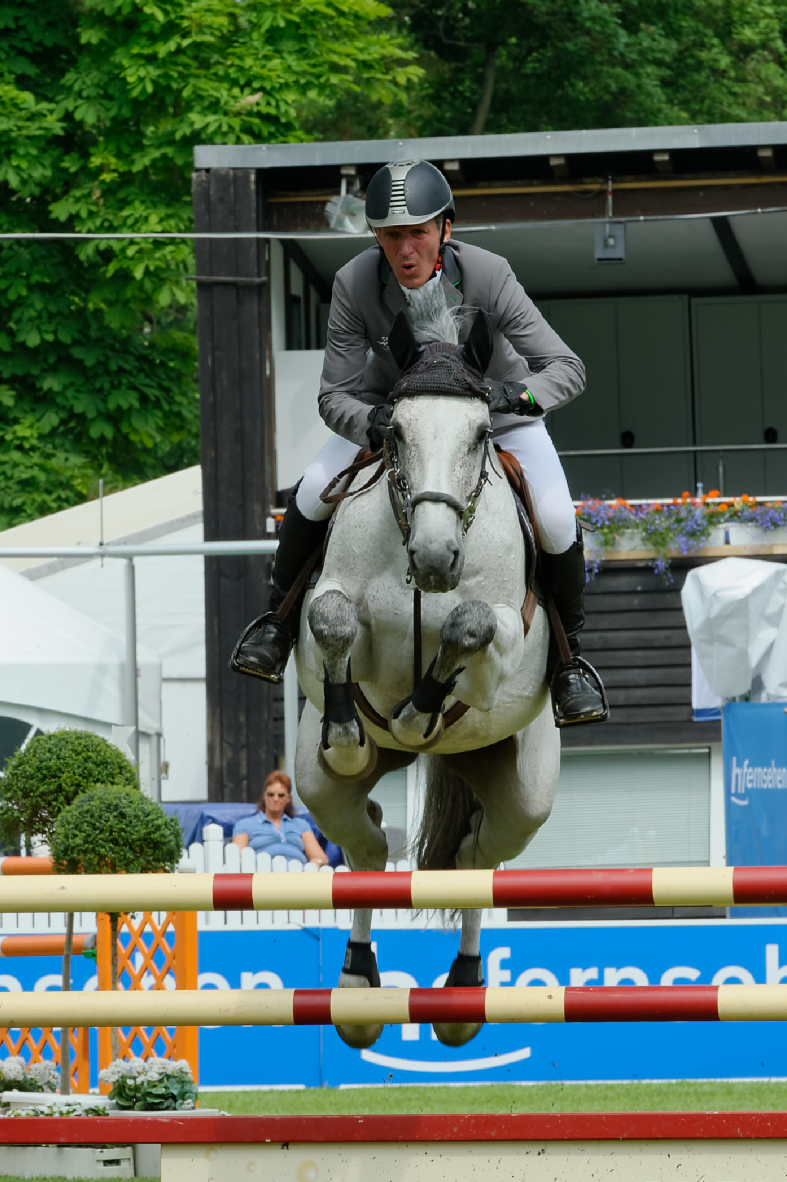
Beerbaum with A-Corrada at CSIYH* in Wiesbaden 2015

Ludger Beerbaum (German pronunciation: [ˈluːtɡɛʁ ˈbeːɐˌbaʊ̯m], audio; born 26 August 1963) is a German equestrian who competes in show jumping. He has been ranked the No. 1 Show Jumper in the world by the FEI on multiple occasions. He is also a four-time Olympic Gold medalist team and individual.

== Early life and competitive career ==
Beerbaum was born in Detmold, West Germany. In school, he took Business Studies, but eventually gave it up for a career in show jumping.

Beerbaum began riding on a Highland Pony at the age of 8. He had a very successful career as a young rider which continued into his adulthood. His most notable accomplishments include winning 4 Olympic Golds (his first at age 25) and numerous European and World Championship medals.

On Sunday 21 September 2008, at the Samsung Super League Final in Barcelona, Beerbaum was a member of the winning German Nations Cup team. He was awarded Leading Rider of the 2008 Super League, along with 50,000 CHF ($46,000). In the Final, he rode the nine-year-old Westphalian gelding, All Inclusive NRW to a double clear round, and was one of only two riders to do so, his teammate Marco Kutscher being the other.

== Family ==
Ludger Beerbaum is the oldest of 4 children, his siblings being Ruth, Monika, and show jumper Markus Beerbaum.

He is married to Arundell Davison, with whom he has two daughters (Cecilia Sophie and Mathilde). From his previous marriage, he has a son (Alexander).

He is also brother-in-law to Meredith Michaels-Beerbaum.

== Top horses ==
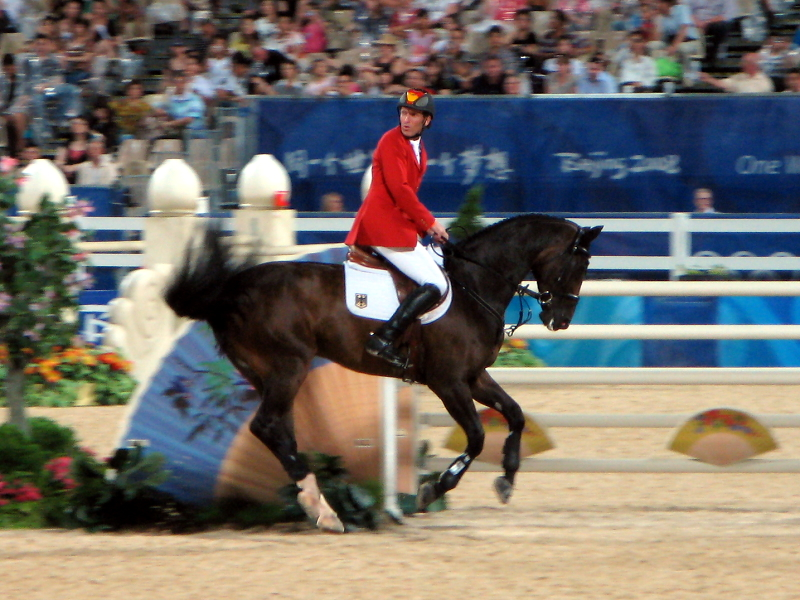
Ludger Beerbaum at the 2008 Olympics

- Goldfever: 1991 chestnut Hanoverian stallion (by Grosso Z)
- Classic Touch 1984 Bay (Holstein) Mare by Caletto II (GOLD Barcelona olympics 1992)
- Ratina Z: 1982 bay Hanoverian mare (Ramiro Z x Almé Z)
- Gladdys S: 1992 chestnut Westphalian mare (Grandeur x Apart)
- PS Priamos: 1982 chestnut Westphalian gelding (Pilot x Direx)
- Enorm: 1997 bay Hanoverian gelding (Escudo I x Calypso II)
- Couleur Rubin: 1996 chestnut Oldenburg stallion (by Cordalme Z)
- L'Espoir: 1996 chestnut Zangersheide gelding (by Landwind II)
- All Inclusive: 1999 bay Westphalian gelding (Arpeggio x Phantom)

== Doping offense ==
At the 2004 Olympic Games, Beerbaum and his mount, Goldfever, managed to finish with only 4 penalty points, helping Germany earn the team gold medal. However, following the competition, Goldfever tested positive for the prohibited substance betamethasone. The International Equestrian Federation found Beerbaum guilty of breaking the rules, stripping both him and his German team of their gold medals, dropping Germany down to bronze. Beerbaum believed the substance to have been present in an ointment administered to the horse due to a skin irritation, and the FEI agreed that the substance provided no competitive advantage. However, in accordance with the rule, Beerbaum was disqualified. He then appealed the decision to the CAS. After the hearing took place, they ruled that Germany's stripped gold medal was then given to the Americans and the silver to the Swedish show jumping team. The Germans, however, were still able to take the bronze medal, even without Goldfever's results.

== Major achievements ==
=== Olympic Games ===
- Team gold medal - 1988 Olympic Games Seoul: 17.25 penalties (The Freak)
- Individual gold medal - 1992 Olympic Games Barcelona: 0 penalties (Classic Touch)
- Team gold medal - 1996 Olympic Games Atlanta: 1.75 penalties (Ratina Z)
- Team gold medal - 2000 Olympic Games Sydney: 15 penalties (Goldfever 3)
- Disqualified, losing team gold medal at the 2004 Olympic Games Athens —See "Doping Offense" above (Goldfever 3)
- Team bronze medal - 2016 Summer Olympics Rio de Janeiro: Casello

=== World Championships ===
- Team silver medal & 73rd Individually - 1990 World Equestrian Games, Stockholm, Sweden (Gazelle)
- Team gold medal & 4th Individually - 1994 World Equestrian Games in The Hague, Netherlands (Ratina Z)
- Team gold medal & 5th Individually - 1998 World Equestrian Games in Rome, Italy (P.S. Priamos)
- 4th place & 22nd Individually - 2002 World Equestrian Games in Jerez de la Frontera, Spain (Gladdys S)
- Team bronze medal & 5th Individually - 2006 World Equestrian Games in Aachen, Germany (L'Espoir)

=== European Championships ===
- Team bronze & Individual bronze - 1984 CH-EU-Y in Cervia, Italy (Wittersfernde)
- Team 5th & Individually 23rd - 1987 CH-EU in St. Gallen, Switzerland (Wiener Domspatz)
- Team 5th & Individually 21st - 1991 CH-EU in La Baule-Escoublac, France (Grand Plaisir)
- Team 4th & Individually 29th - 1993 CH-EU in Gijón, Spain (Rush On)
- Team gold & Individual gold - 1997 CH-EU in Mannheim, Germany (Ratina Z)
- Team gold & Individually 26th - 1999 CH-EU in Hickstead, Great Britain (Champion du Lys)
- Team bronze & Individual gold - 2001 CH-EU in Arnhem, Netherlands (Gladdys S)
- Team gold & Individual silver - 2003 CH-EU in Donaueschingen, Germany (Goldfever 3)
- Team silver & Individual bronze - 2007 CH-EU in Mannheim, Germany (Goldfever 3)
- Team gold & Individually 8th - 2011 CH-EU in Madrid, Spain (Gotha FRH)
- Team silver & Individually 6th - 2013 CH-EU in Herning, Denmark (Chiara 222)
- Team silver & Individually 12th - 2015 CH-EU in Aachen, Germany (Chiara 222)

=== World Cup Final ===
- 1st - 1993 World Cup Final in Gothenburg, Sweden (Ratina Z)
- 4th - 1995 World Cup Final in Gothenburg, Sweden (Gaylord & Ratina Z)
- 6th - 1996 World Cup Final in Geneva, Switzerland (Gaylord & Rush On)
- 3rd - 1998 World Cup Final in Helsinki, Finland (P.S. Priamos)
- 6th - 1999 World Cup Final in Gothenburg, Sweden (Ratina Z & P.S. Priamos)
- 4th - 2000 World Cup Final in Las Vegas, United States (Goldfever 3)
- 2nd - 2002 World Cup Final in Leipzig, Germany (Gladdys S)
- 8th - 2003 World Cup Final in Las Vegas, United States (Goldfever 3)
- 12th - 2005 World Cup Final in Las Vegas, United States (Couleur Rubin)
- 4th - 2008 World Cup Final in Gothenburg, Sweden (All Inclusive NRW)
- 6th - 2009 World Cup Final in Las Vegas, United States (Coupe de Coeur)
- Joint 2nd - 2010 World Cup Final in Le Grand-Saconnex near Geneve, Switzerland (Gotha FRH)
- 2nd - 2014 World Cup Final in Lyon, France (Chaman & Chiara 222)

=== Other major achievements ===
- Multiple World No. 1 Show Jumper ranking by the FEI
- 8-time winner of the German masters (1988, 1992, 1993, 1997, 1998, 2000, 2001, 2004)
- 3-time Rider of the Year (2001, 2002, 2003)
- 3-time winner of the Grand Prix of Aachen (1996 Ratina Z; 2002 and 2003 Goldfever 3)
- Winner of the Bambi prize in 1992
- Winner of the 2002 CN International at the Spruce Meadows Masters on the stallion, Goldfever 3.
