= Chiara 222 =

Holsteiner mare from Germany

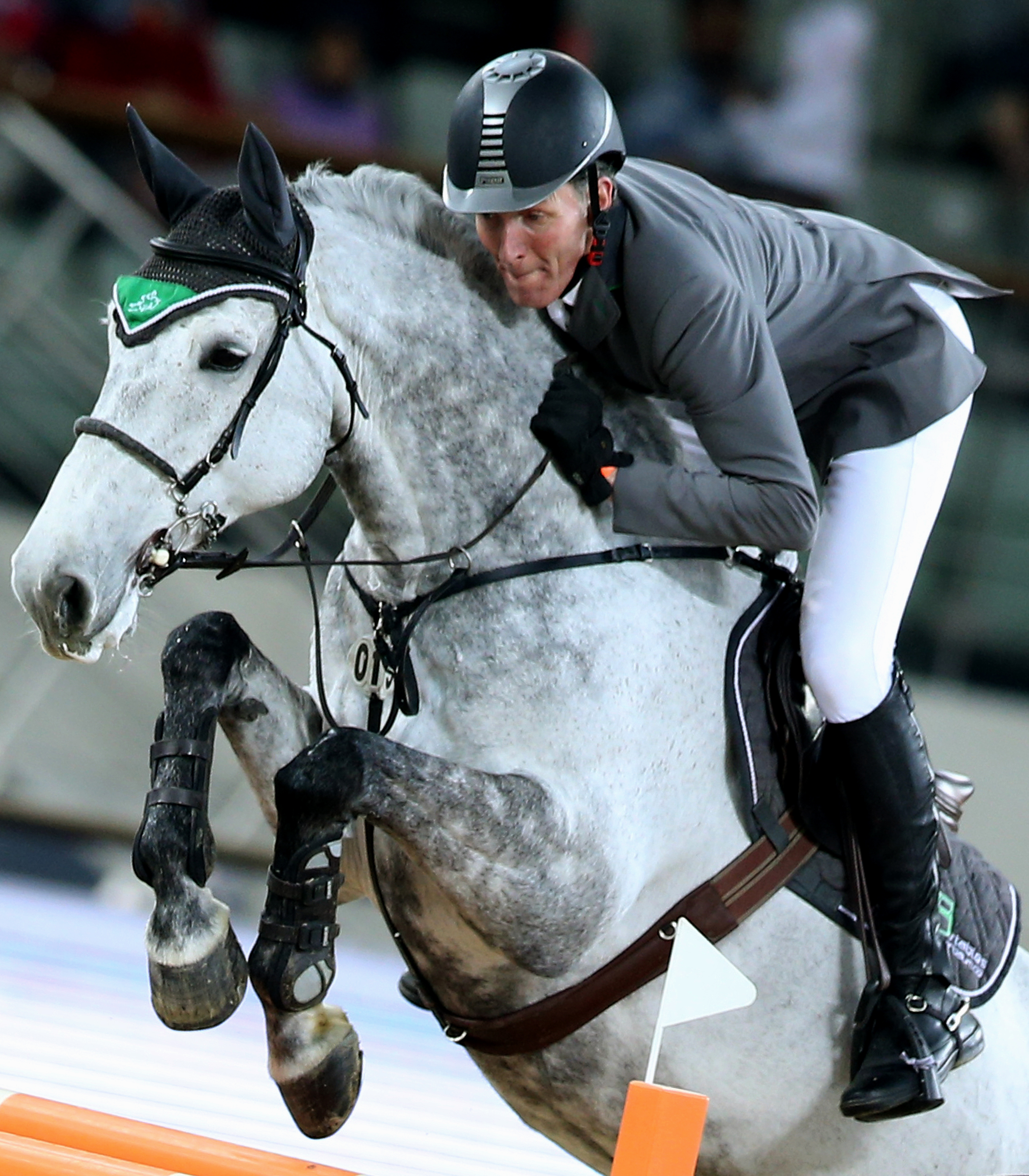
- German rider Ludger Beerbaum at the CHI Al Shaqab in Doha, with his mare Chiara 222.
- Breed: Holsteiner
- Sire: Contender
- Dam: Larissa
- Sex: Female
- Foaled: Bahrenfleth
- Died: 2019

Chiara 222 (April 16, 2003, Bahrenfleth - April 24, 2019) was a gray mare registered in the Holsteiner studbook and ridden in show jumping. This daughter of Contender was born in the Oldenburg region. After a successful debut under the saddle of Irish rider Cameron Hanley, she was snapped up by Germany's Ludger Beerbaum, with whom she won three silver medals, at the 2013 European Dressage and Show Jumping Team Championships, at the 2013-2014 Show Jumping World Cup Final as an individual, and then at the 2014 World Equestrian Games as a team. She was euthanized in April 2019, at the age of 16, following a bout of colic, without the possibility of retirement.

Chiara 222 stood out for her atypical jumping style, with a raised head carriage and low forehand passage. Her character was said to be very gentle, as Ludger Beerbaum let his daughter ride her.

== History ==
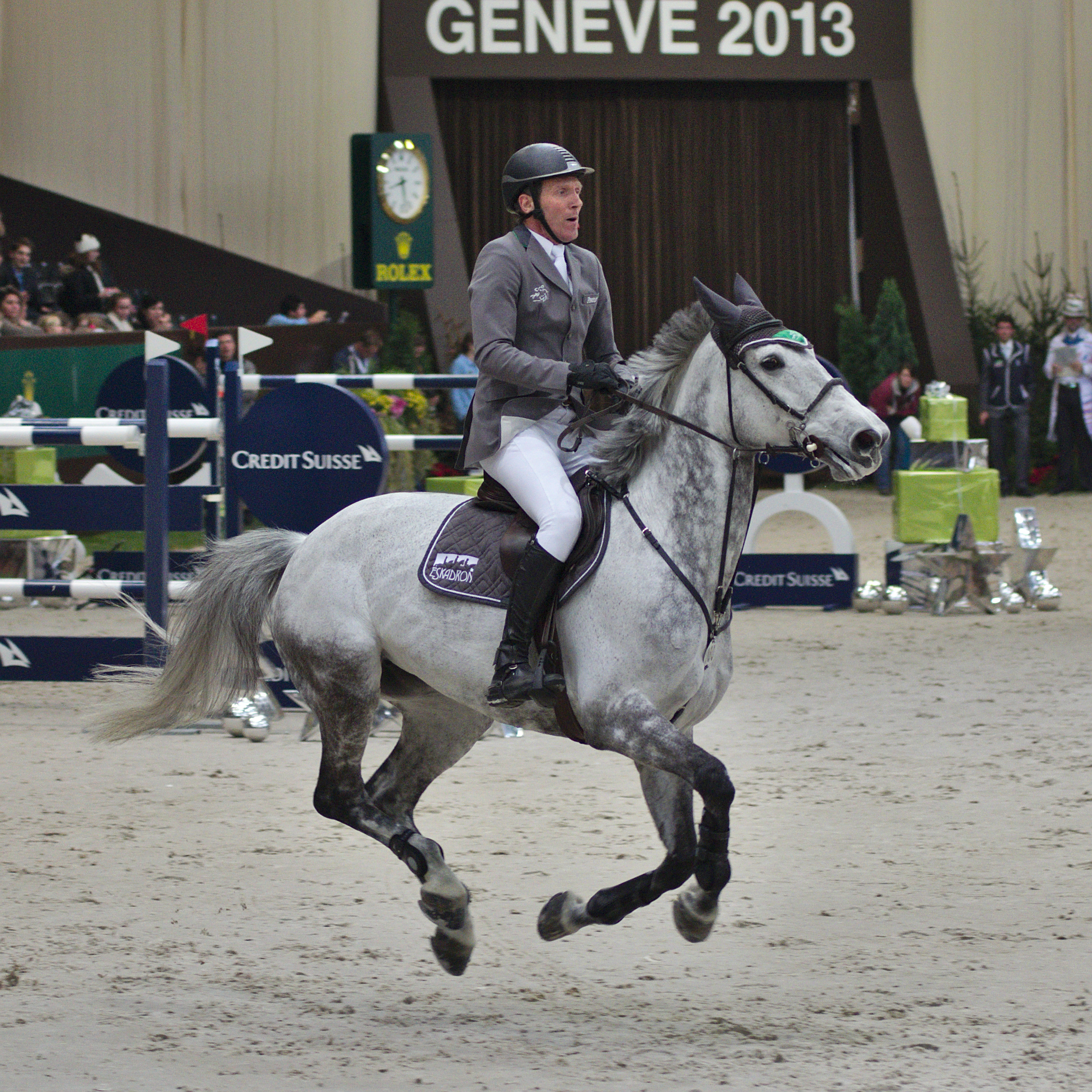
Ludger Beerbaum and Chiara 222 at the CHI in Geneva, 2013.

Chiara 222 was born on April 16, 2003 at the Guenter Schueder stud in Bahrenfleth, Germany. Although a Holsteiner studbook mare, she was born in the heart of the Oldenburg region. Her breeder described her as a normal filly, and sold her at auction at the age of two and a half. She was acquired by Anna Gkouskova.

Her career at the highest level began at the age of 8, in 2011, with Irish rider Cameron Hanley, who took her up to the 1.45 m level, winning her first event at the Concours de saut international deux étoiles (CSI2*). After a brief stay at Giulia Martinengo Marquet's Italian stables for 4 competitions in June 2011, she was ridden by German rider Ludger Beerbaum from September onwards. She has been owned by Madeleine Winter-Schulze, Ludger Beerbaum's horse owner, since September 2011.

The agreement with Beerbaum was immediate. As early as 2012, they took second place in the George V Cup at Hickstead; the following year, they won two Nations Cup stages, and were team silver medallists in the European Championships. The couple was selected by Otto Becker to represent Germany at the 2014 World Equestrian Games. In November 2014, Chiara suffered from colic on arrival at the CSI5* in Doha, prompting Beerbaum to compete with his other horse, Zinedine, to preserve her.

Chiara 222 competed in the 2017 World Cup Final at Omaha, despite a lacklustre winter season. In November 2018, she wins the final qualifying round of the Global Champions Tour.

Her last competition was a victory over 1.60 m in Doha at the beginning of March 2019, where she signed the fastest double clear of the three courses. She suffered a bout of colic shortly afterwards, which led to her euthanasia a month later, on the morning of April 24, 2019, at the age of 16, due to a sudden deterioration in her health, and the lack of recovery after her operation. Beerbaum declared that he was affected by the loss of his mare.

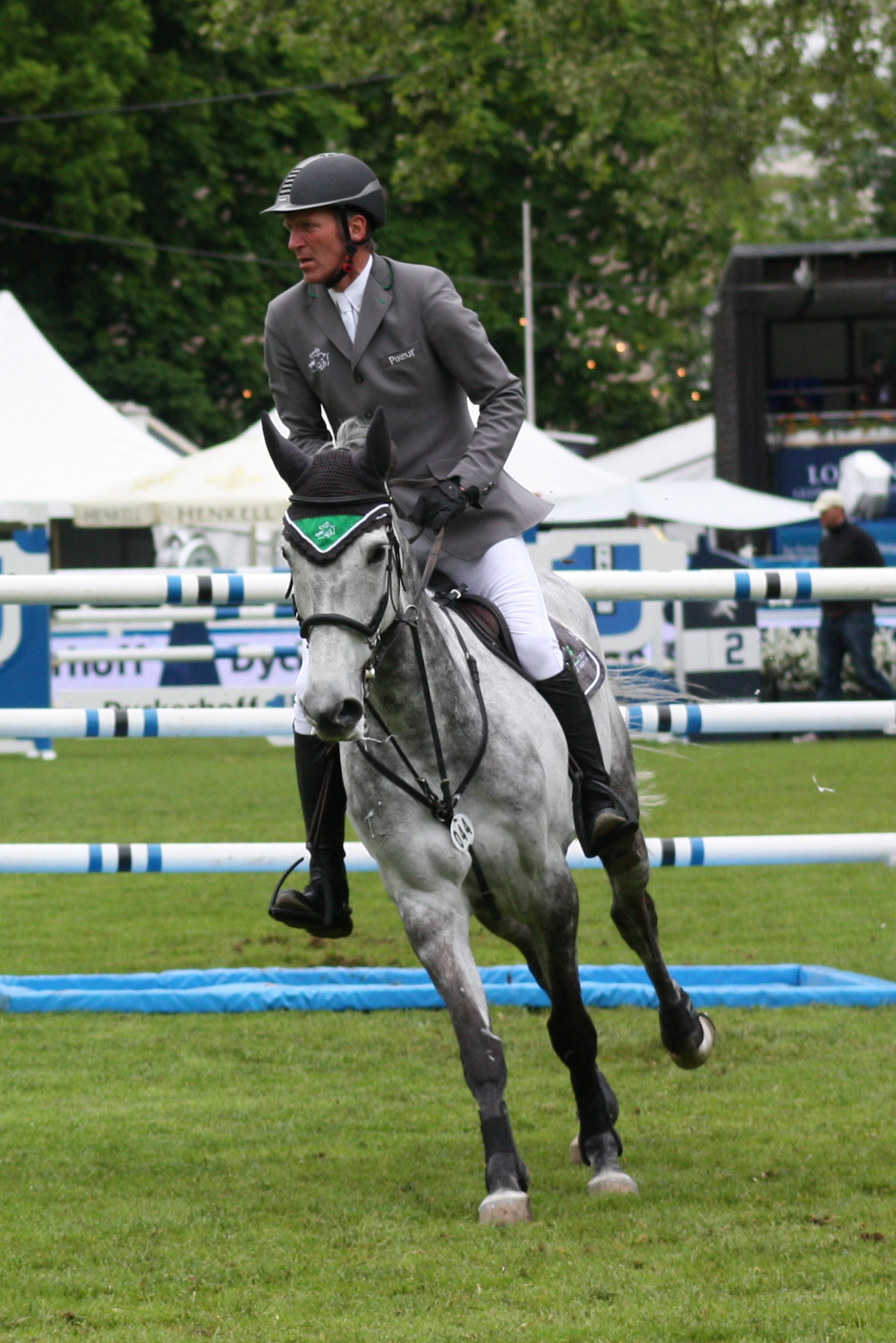
Chiara 222 ridden by Ludger Beerbaum at the International Wiesbaden Whitsun Tournament 2013, CSI5* Opening Jumping.

== Description ==
Chiara 222 was a Holsteiner studbook mare. Her gray coat, originally dappled, became lighter over the years. The mare proved equally at home in outdoor and indoor competitions. Chiara 222 had atypical movements, in particular a head carriage in the air, and a rather low foreleg movement. This head movement was the biggest difficulty to master when riding her in competition. According to Beerbaum, Chiara had a very gentle character, as he left his 7-year-old daughter ride her.

== Results ==
Chiara 222 was one of the most important horses in Ludger Beerbaum's career, and he competed with her for 8 years. She won 15 races during her sporting career. A mainstay of the German national team, she competed three times at the renowned Aachen International Show Jumping Competition, placing highly at each of these events.

=== 2011 season ===
Chiara 222 was ridden by three different riders during the 2011 season: Cameron Hanley at the start of the year, Giulia Martinengo Marquet in June, then Ludger Beerbaum from September onwards.

- February 6, 2011: Winner of the Grand Prix at the CSI2* in Treffen.
- October 26, 2011: 7th in the Equita'Masters at 1.60 m, at the 5-star International Jumping Competition World Cup ranking (CSI5*-W) in Lyon.

=== 2012 season ===
- February 16, 2012: second in the Grand Prix at 1.55 m at the CSI3* in Neumünster.
- April 18, 2012: 4th in the Grand Prix at 1.55 m at the CSI3* in Bois-le-Duc.
- June 14, 2012: 7th in the Global Champions Tour leg at 1.50 m at the CSI5* in Cannes.
- July 3, 2012: 8th in the Prix de Rhénanie-du-Nord-Westphalie at 1.55 m at the 5-star International Olympic Jumping Competition (CSIO5*) in Aachen.
- July 19, 2012: 3rd in the British Nations Cup at 1.60 m at the CSIO5* in Hickstead; second in the George V Cup at 1.60 m.
- September 14, 2012: 7th in the Prix Nissan at 1.45 m and 8th in the Grand Prix de la Ville de Lausanne at 1.45 m-1.50 m at the Lausanne CSI5*.
- October 31, 2012: 4th in the Equita'Masters at 1.60 m, at the CSI5*-W in Lyon.
- December 6, 2012: 3rd in the Coupe de Genève at 1.50 m, CSI5* Geneva.

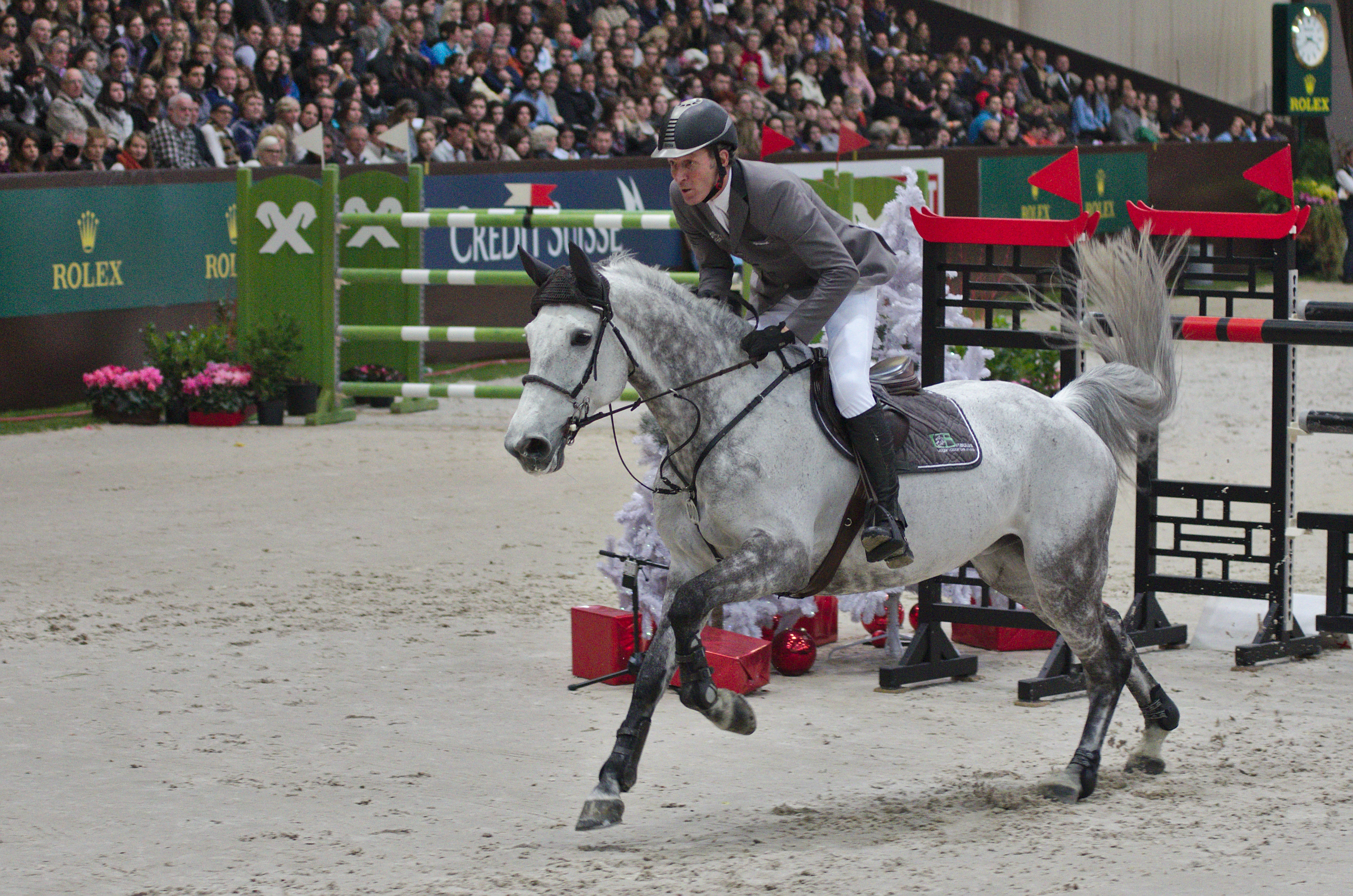
Chiara 222 ridden by Ludger Beerbaum at the CHI5* in Geneva, December 2013.

=== 2013 season ===
She was 23rd in the World Breeding Federation for Sport Horses (WBFSH) world ranking of show jumping horses in October 2013.

- February 8, 2013: 7th in the Prix à 1.50 m at the CSI5* Bordeaux.
- March 27, 2013: 4th in the Grand Prix Al Shaqab at 1.60 m at the CSI5* in Doha.
- May 18, 2013: 4th in the 1.60 m Global Champions Tour Grand Prix at the CSI5* in Wiesbaden.
- June 20, 2013: Winner of the Nations Cup 1.60 m stage at the Rotterdam CSIO5*.
- June 25, 2013: 3rd in the 1.50 m event at the CSIO5* in Aachen; 6th in the Grand Prix at 1.60 m.
- August 2, 2013: winner of the Nations' Cup 1.60-m class at the CSIO5* in Hickstead.
- August 4, 2013: 5th in the 1.60 m Grand Prix at the CSIO5* in Hickstead.
- August 21, 2013: Team silver medal and 6th individual at 1.60 m at the European Championships in Herning.
- September 8, 2013: Winner of the 1.60 m class at the Donetsk CSI5*.
- November 23, 2013: second in the Al Shaqab Grand Prix at 1.60 m, at the CSI5* in Doha.
- December 8, 2013: 5th in the Gucci Grand Prix at 1.60 m, at the CSI5* in Paris.

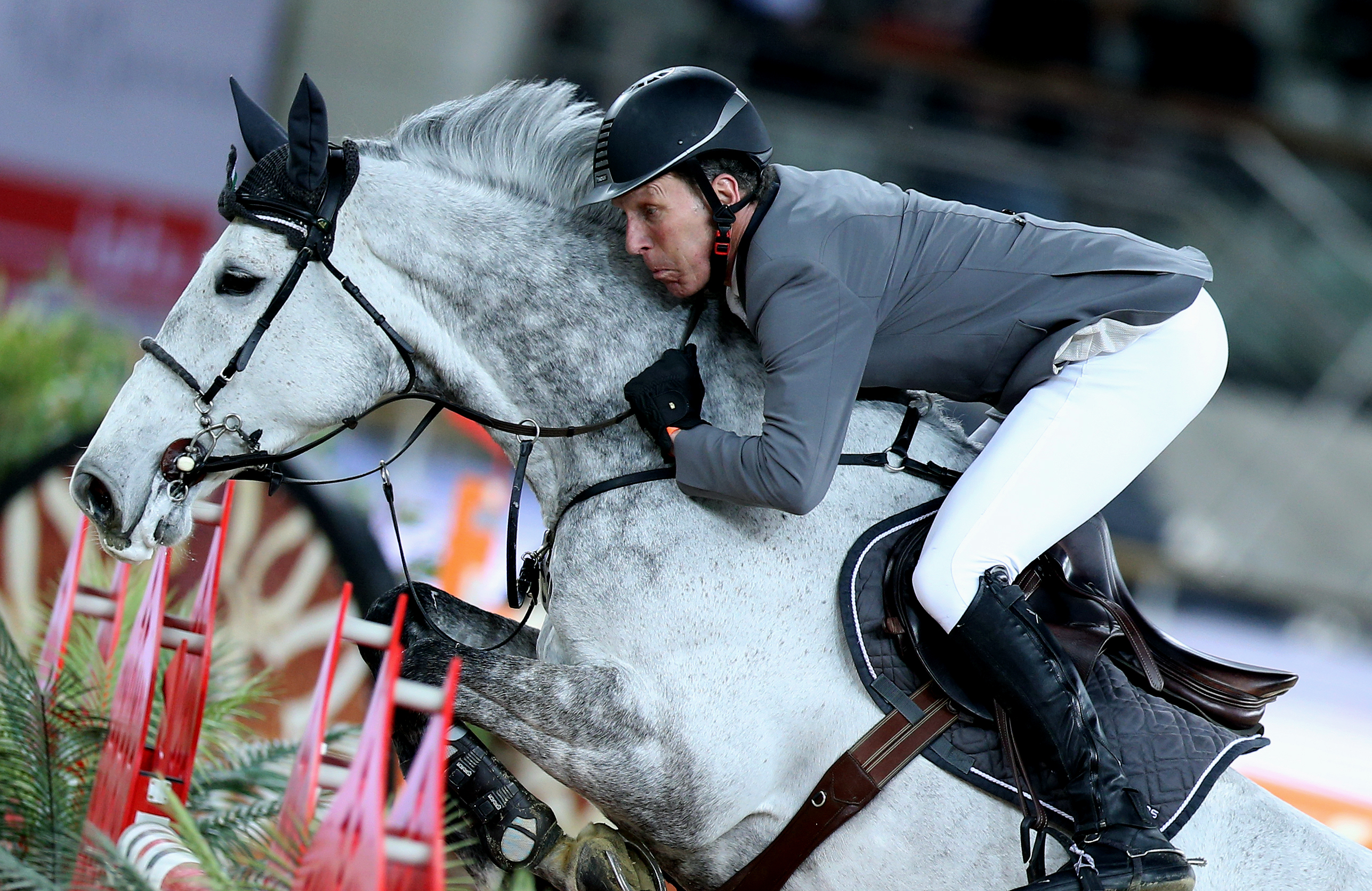
Chiara 222 ridden by Ludger Beerbaum at the CSI5* Al Shaqab in Doha, March 2014.

=== 2014 season ===
She was voted best horse in Germany in 2014, she was ranked 4th best show jumping horse in the world in the WBFSH rankings in June, then 7th in the same rankings in October.

- January 12, 2014: second in the 1.60 m Grand Prix at the CSI5* Basel, Halle Saint-Jacques.
- February 28, 2014: 4th in a 1.50 m class on the World Cup stage of the CSI5* in Gothenburg.
- March 15, 2014: winner of the 2014 Al Shaqab Grand Prix at 1.60 m at the CSI5* in Doha.
- April 21, 2014: individual silver medal in the World Cup final at 1.50 m-1.60 m in Lyon.
- May 23, 2014: 3rd in the Nations Cup leg at 1.60 m at the CSIO5* in Rome.
- June 20, 2014: 3rd in the 1.60 m Nations' Cup leg of the Rotterdam CSIO5*.
- July 20, 2014: 8th in the 1.60 m Rolex Grand Prix at the CSIO5* in Aachen.
- August 2, 2014: 3rd in the 1.60 m Global Champions Tour leg at Valkenswaard.
- September 2014: 33rd individual at the 2014 World Equestrian Games in Caen, 4th team.
- September 19, 2014: 5th in the 1.60 m Global Champions Tour event, in Ebreichsdorf - Magna Racino.
- October 11, 2014: 5th in the World Cup event (third event) at 1.60 m, in Barcelona.

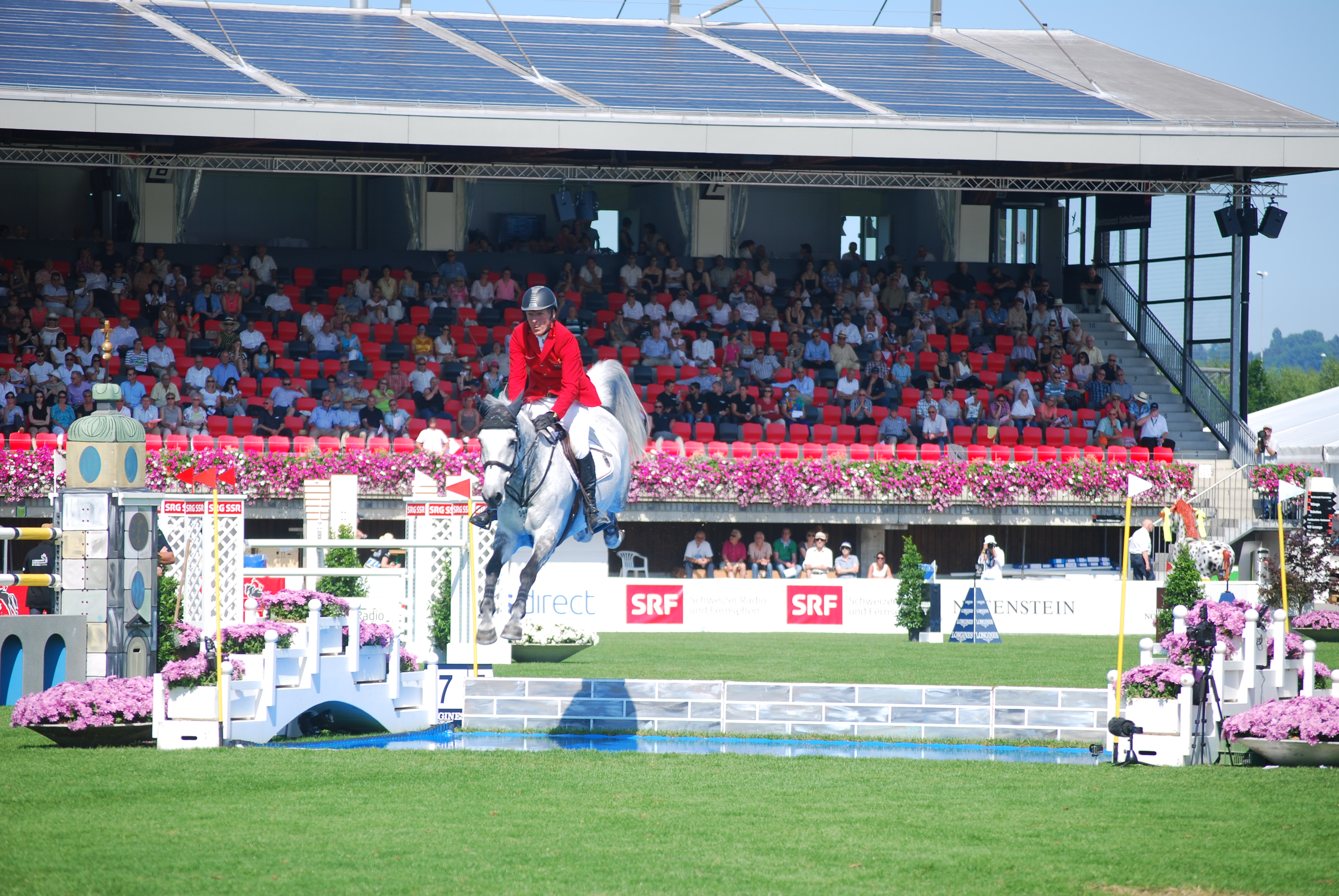
Chiara 222 ridden by Ludger Beerbaum at the CSIO5* in St. Gallen in June 2015.

=== 2015 season ===
Chiara 222 is considered one of the world's best show jumping horses of 2015. She ranks 13th in the WBFSH world rankings drawn up in October.

- March 4, 2015: 6th in a 1.50 m class at the CSI5* Al Shaqab in Doha.
- March 14, 2015: 5th in the′Audi Prijs, 1.55 m event at the CSI5* de Bois-le-Duc.
- May 1, 2015: 3rd in a 1.50 m class at the CSI5* Global Champions Tour in Madrid.
- May 3, 2015: 4th in a 1.55-m class at the CSI5* Global Champions Tour in Madrid.
- May 16, 2015: 8th in the 1.60 m Grand Prix at the CSI5* Global Champions Tour in Hamburg.
- May 31, 2015: 4th in the 1.60 m Grand Prix at the CSI5* Aachen.
- June 5, 2015: 5th in the 1.60 m Nations' Cup leg of the CSIO5* in St. Gallen.
- June 19, 2015: 4th in the Nations' Cup at 1.60 m, CSIO5* Rotterdam.
- June 21, 2015: 5th in the 1.60 m Grand Prix at the CSIO5* in Rotterdam.
- July 2015: Winner of the 1.60 m Grand Prix at the CSIO5* in Mannheim; 4th in the Nations' Cup stage at 1.60 m.
- August 2015: 13th individual and silver team medal at the European show jumping championships, on 1.60 m, in Aachen.
- September 26, 2015: 6th in the 1.60 m final of the CSIO5* Nations Cup stage in Barcelona.
- November 14, 2015: 7th in the 1.60 m Grand Prix of the CSI5* Global Champions Tour Al Shaqab in Doha.
- December 21, 2015: second in the 1.60 m Grand Prix at the CSI5*-W (World Cup stage) in London.

=== 2016 season ===
- March 5, 2016: winner of the 1.60 m Grand Prix at the CSI5* in Doha.
- May 13, 2016: 4th in the 1.60 m event at the CSIO5* Nations Cup stage in La Baule.
- May 28, 2016: winner of the 1.60 m Grand Prix at the CSI5* Global Champions Tour in Chantilly.
- July 15, 2016: 3rd in the Preis von Nordrhein-Westfalen at 1.55 m at the CSIO5* in Aachen.
- July 29, 2016: winner of the Nations Cup at 1.60 m at the CSIO5* in Hickstead.
- September 25, 2016: 3rd in the Barcelona City Cup at 1.55 m, at the Barcelona CSIO5*.
- November 5, 2016: 5th in the 1.50m-1.55m event at the CSI5* Global Champions Tour in Doha.
- November 24, 2016: second in the 1.50 m class at the CSI5*-W in Madrid.
- November 26, 2016: 3rd in the 1.50 m World Cup leg in Madrid.

=== 2017 season ===
- February 4, 2017: 7th in the 1.40m-1.60m World Cup stage in Bordeaux.
- March 19, 2017: 4th in the Grand prix Hermès at 1.60 m in Paris.
- March 27, 2017: 3rd in the World Cup Final Grand Prix at 1.60 m in Omaha.
- April 28, 2017: 7th in the 1.50m-1.55m event at the CSI5* Global Champions Tour in Shanghai.
- May 27, 2017: second in the 1.55m-1.60m event at the CSI5* Global Champions Tour in Hamburg.
- July 19, 2017: second in the Turkish Airlines-Preis von Europa at 1.55 m at the CSIO5* Grand Slam stage in Aachen.
- November 11, 2017: 3rd in the 1.45 m class at the CSI3* in Maastricht.
- November 24, 2017: 3rd in the 1.55 m class at the CSI5*-W in Madrid.
- December 8, 2017: 3rd in the 1.50 m-1.55 m class at the CSI5*-W in La Coruña.

=== 2018 and 2019 seasons ===
- April 8, 2018: 6th in the 1.50 m Grand Prix at the CSI3* in Lanaken.
- April 20, 2018: 4th in the 1.50m-1.60m event at the CSI5* Global Champions Tour Shanghai.
- August 11, 2018: winner of the 1.55 m class at the CSI5* Global Champions Tour in Valkenswaard.
- August 25, 2018: 3rd in the 1.45 m class at the CSI4* in Münster.
- September 29, 2018: second in the 1.55 m class at the CSI5* in Waregem.
- October 28, 2018: winner of the 1.45 m class at the CSI5*-W in Verona.
- November 8, 2018: winner of the 1.50 m-1.55 m class at the CSI5* Global Champions Tour Al Shaqab in Doha.
- November 24, 2018: 4th in the 1.50 m class at the CSI5*-W in Madrid.
- December 9, 2018: 4th in the 1.45 m class at the CSI5*-W in La Coruña.
- December 30, 2018: 6th in the 1.45-m class at the CSI5*-W in Mechelen.
- March 8, 2019: winner of a 1.60 m class at the CHI Al Shaqab in Doha.

== Origins ==
Chiara 222 is a daughter of the stallion Contender and the mare Larissa, by Coronado 3.

Pedigree of Chiara 222 (2003-2019)
Sire Contender (1984-2014)	Calypso II (1974)	Cor de la Bryère (1968-2000)	Rantzau (1946-1971)
Sire Contender (1984-2014)	Calypso II (1974)	Cor de la Bryère (1968-2000)	Quenotte (1960)
Sire Contender (1984-2014)	Calypso II (1974)	Tabelle (1959)	No info
Sire Contender (1984-2014)	Calypso II (1974)	Tabelle (1959)	No info
Sire Contender (1984-2014)	Gofine (1970)	Ramiro Z (1965-1995)	Raimond (1960)
Sire Contender (1984-2014)	Gofine (1970)	Ramiro Z (1965-1995)	Valine (1961)
Sire Contender (1984-2014)	Gofine (1970)	Cita (1966)	Ladykiller (1961)
Sire Contender (1984-2014)	Gofine (1970)	Cita (1966)	No info
Dam Larissa (1996)	Coronado (1990)	Corrado I (1985-2018)	Cor de la Bryère (1968-2000)
Dam Larissa (1996)	Coronado (1990)	Corrado I (1985-2018)	Soleil (1980)
Dam Larissa (1996)	Coronado (1990)	Zaala (1985)	No info
Dam Larissa (1996)	Coronado (1990)	Zaala (1985)	No info
Dam Larissa (1996)	Delia I (1989)	Capitol I (1975-1999)	Hasta (1971)
Dam Larissa (1996)	Delia I (1989)	Capitol I (1975-1999)	Capitano (1968)
Dam Larissa (1996)	Delia I (1989)	Folia (1968)	No info
Dam Larissa (1996)	Delia I (1989)	Folia (1968)	No info
