= Gandini Lianos =

- Breed: Holsteiner
- Sire: Landlord
- Dam: Vorr
- Sex: Gelding
- Foaled: 1987
- Country: Germany
- Colour: Bay
- Owner: Vittorio Orlandi

Gandini Lianos was a horse ridden by Rodrigo Pessoa. He won the World Championship in the sport of show jumping. He stands 16.2 hands (66 inches, 168 cm).

== Major achievements ==
- 1998 Rome: WEG World champion of show jumping
- 2000 Calgary: Spruce Meadows Grand Prix
- 2001 Calgary: Spruce Meadows Grand Prix
