= Simon Wilson (equestrian) =

New Zealand equestrian

Simon Wilson (born 1972 or 1973) is an equestrian from Waipukurau. He owns and trains horses in addition to his participation in various races. He has won in all of New Zealand's top equestrian competitions.

In 2004, he won the Olympic Cup, riding Vita Power Swinger, as well as the Kelt Capital Horse of the Year title. In 2006, he won the North Island Grand Prix showjumping championships at Dannevirke, riding Swinger; the World Cup final in Auckland, riding Vita Power Right Royal; and the 2006 Rutherford Cup in Christchurch, where he placed twice: in first on Right Royal and in fifth on Swinger. On the first day of the 2006 Horse of the Year Show in Hastings, he placed first on Right Royal and third on Swinger in the Norwood Gold Cup. That year, he was chosen as one of New Zealand's representatives on the first New Zealand Tri-Nations team.

In January 2007, he won the Bomac World Cup qualifiers at Dannevirke riding Swinger. He participated in FEI World Cup Jumping 2008/2009, placing twice at Hastings on 21 October 2008: first on Right Royal and second on Swinger; and placing first at Gisborne 13 January 2009 on Right Royal. In 2010, he was part of the New Zealand team winning the Nations Cup at the Kelt Capital Horse of the Year Show in Hastings.

== Personal life ==
Wilson grew up in Waverley, Taranaki, and is married to fellow equestrian Claire Wilson.
