= Emanuele Gaudiano =

Italian equestrian (born 1986)

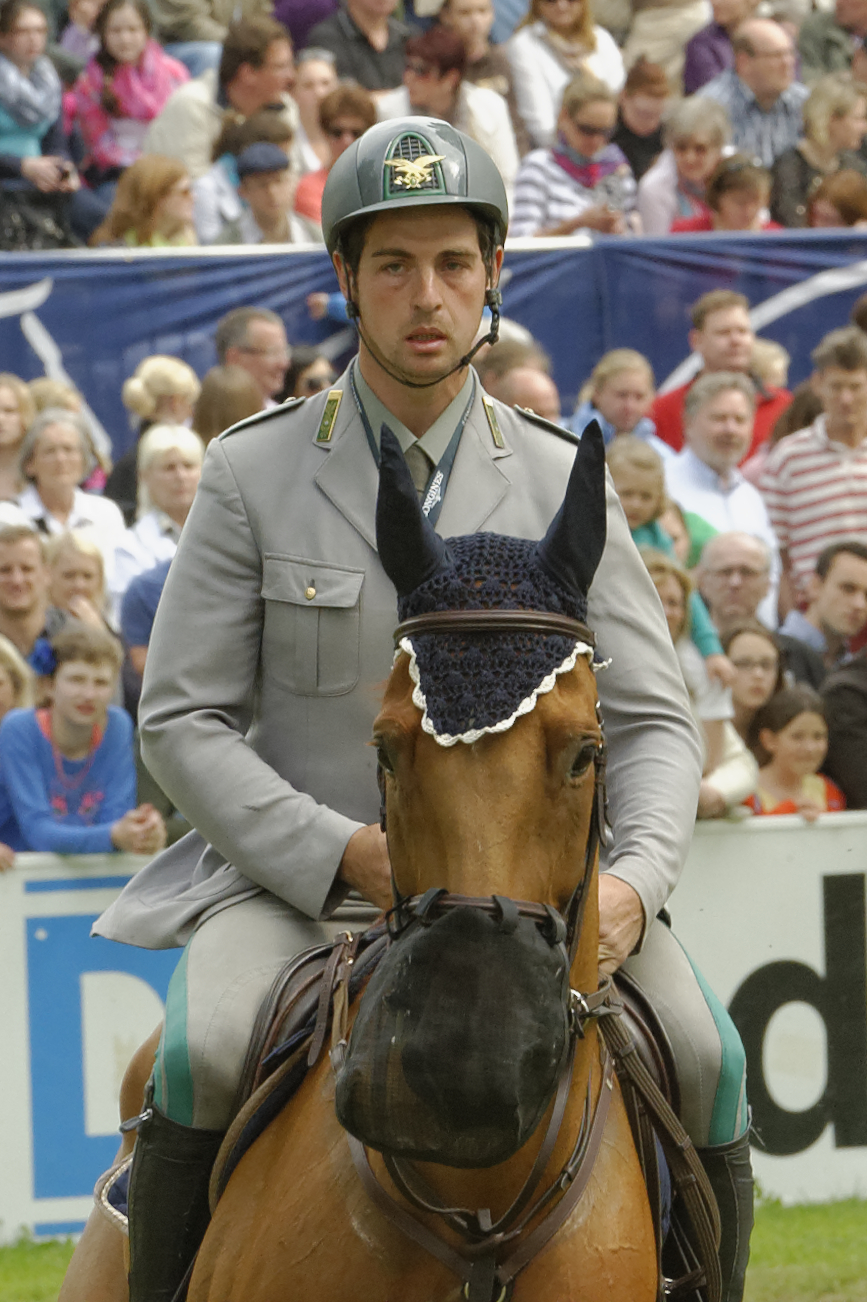
- Emanuele Gaudiano (2013)

Personal information
- Born: 30 June 1986 (age 39) Matera, Italy
- Height: 1.75 m (5 ft 9 in)
- Weight: 70 kg (154 lb)

Sport
- Sport: Olympic show jumping

Emanuele Gaudiano (born 30 June 1986) is an Italian Olympic show jumping rider. He competed at the 2016 Summer Olympics in Rio de Janeiro, Brazil, where he finished 67th in the individual competition.

Gaudiano participated at the 2014 World Equestrian Games and at three European Show Jumping Championships (in 2011, 2013 and 2015). He finished 7th in the team competition at the 2013 European Championships held in Herning, Denmark.

His main horse is called Chalou. he has a son called Elia Gaudiano and a daughter named Lisa Gaudiano. His wife is called henrike Gaudiano.
