= Bahrenfleth =

- Municipality
- Coat of arms

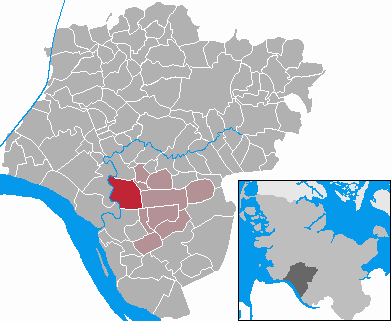
- Location of Bahrenfleth within Steinburg district
- Interactive map of Bahrenfleth
- Location within Germany Location within Schleswig-Holstein
- Coordinates: 53°52′N 9°25′E
- Country: Germany
- State: Schleswig-Holstein
- District: Steinburg
- Municipal assoc.: Krempermarsch

Government
  - Mayor: Harm Früchtenicht

Area
  - Total: 14.77 km^{2} (5.70 sq mi)
- Elevation: 8 m (26 ft)

Population (2025-12-31)
  - Total: 562
  - Density: 38.1/km^{2} (98.5/sq mi)
- Time zone: UTC+01:00 (CET)
  - Summer (DST): UTC+02:00 (CEST)
- Postal codes: 25569
- Dialling codes: 04824
- Vehicle registration: IZ
- Website: www.amt- krempermarsch.de

Bahrenfleth is a municipality in the Steinburg district, in Schleswig-Holstein, Germany. The town was founded in the 14th century.
