= Ian Millar =

Canadian equestrian

Ian Millar CM
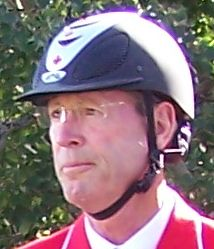

Personal information
- Full name: Ian Millar
- Nationality: Canada
- Discipline: Show jumping
- Born: January 6, 1947 (age 79); Halifax, Nova Scotia, Canada
- Height: 6 ft 1 in (1.85 m)
- Weight: 167 lb (76 kg; 11 st 13 lb)
Medal record
Equestrian
Representing Canada
Olympic Games
Silver medal – second place	2008 Beijing	Team jumping
Pan American Games
Gold medal – first place	1987 Indianapolis	Individual jumping
Gold medal – first place	1987 Indianapolis	Team jumping
Gold medal – first place	1999 Winnipeg	Individual jumping
Gold medal – first place	2015 Toronto	Team jumping
Silver medal – second place	1979 San Juan	Team jumping
Silver medal – second place	1983 Caracas	Team jumping
Silver medal – second place	1991 Havana	Team jumping
Silver medal – second place	2007 Rio de Janeiro	Team jumping
Bronze medal – third place	1979 San Juan	Individual jumping
Bronze medal – third place	1999 Winnipeg	Team jumping

Ian Millar CM (born January 6, 1947) is a Canadian Equestrian Team athlete for show jumping. He is a two-time winner of the Show Jumping World Cup, and an Olympic silver medallist. Due to his longevity and accomplishments, he is often nicknamed "Captain Canada." He holds the record for most Olympic appearances by any athlete in any sport (10), shared with Georgian shooter Nino Salukvadze. A member of Canada's 2012 Olympic Games team, he broke the record when he took part in his tenth Games in London 2012.

== Biography ==
Millar was born in Halifax, Nova Scotia. He operates "Millar Brooke Farm" near the small town of Perth, Ontario, alongside his children Jonathon Millar and Amy Millar, and daughter-in-law Kelly Soleau-Millar.

In 1986 he was made a Member of the Order of Canada, and in 1996 was inducted into the Canadian Sports Hall of Fame. In 2013, he was inducted into the Ontario Sports Hall of Fame.

He has a degree in business administration from Algonquin College, and received an honorary doctorate from the University of Guelph.

His wife Lynn died of cancer in March 2008.

=== Equestrian career ===
Millar is a twelve-time winner of the Canadian Show Jumping Championship. He has been a staple on the Canadian Equestrian Team for decades, and has amassed over $3.5 million in prize earnings at the prestigious Spruce Meadows venue in Calgary, Alberta.

With his horse, Big Ben (1976–1999), Millar won more than 40 Grand Prix titles worldwide and the Show Jumping World Cup two years in a row (1988 & 1989). At the Pan American Games in August 1987, Ian Millar became the second Canadian to win an individual gold medal. He now has nine Pan American Games medals, including two individual golds. He holds the North American record for Grand Prix and Derby wins. He was a member of every Canadian Equestrian Team at the Show Jumping World Championships from 1972 to 2014. At the 2012 Summer Olympics, Millar competed at his tenth games (his first having been in 1972, having only missed the 1980 Games due to the US-led boycott against the Soviet Union), breaking the record set by Hubert Raudaschl.

On 18 August, at the 2008 Summer Olympics in Beijing, at the age of 61, Millar anchored his team (also including Jill Henselwood, Eric Lamaze, and Mac Cone) to a first-place standing. Riding In Style, he completed a faultless round to lead the Canadian team into a jump-off for gold with the United States. Ultimately Canada would finish behind the American team to capture silver – Millar's first Olympic medal.

Millar was named to the 2012 Olympic team, making that appearance, his tenth, a record for any Olympic athlete's appearances at Olympics. In the 2012 Olympics' Individual Jumping event, Millar finished in a three-way tie for ninth aboard his gelding Star Power, the best Canadian result. In Team Jumping, Millar, along with fellow riders Jill Henselwood and Eric Lamaze, scored a fifth-place finish for Canada.

On September 14, 2014, Millar won the $1.5-million CP International at Spruce Meadows aboard Dixson, who shares bloodlines with Big Ben. This was the third time he had won the class, having won previously in 1987 and 1991 with Big Ben.

On July 23, 2015, Millar won a gold medal in the Pan American Games team jumping event.

On May 1, 2019, Millar announced his retirement from international competition to re-focus his attention on coaching and developing young horses.

== International championship results ==
Results
Year	Event	Horse	Placing	Notes
1972	Olympic Games	The Shoeman	6th	Team
1976	Olympic Games	Count Down	5th	Team
1979	Pan American Games	Brother Sam	2nd place, silver medalist(s)	Team
1979	Pan American Games	Brother Sam	3rd place, bronze medalist(s)	Individual
1980	World Cup Final	Year of the Cat	14th	
1980	World Championships	Brother Sam	1st place, gold medalist(s)	Team
1980	World Championships	Brother Sam	RET	Individual
1982	World Championships	Wunderbar	5th	Team
1982	World Championships	Wunderbar	49th	Individual
1983	Pan American Games	Foresight	2nd place, silver medalist(s)	Team
1983	Pan American Games	Foresight	5th	Individual
1984	World Cup Final	Wotan	18th	
1984	Olympic Games	Big Ben	4th	Team
1984	Olympic Games	Big Ben	14th	Individual
1985	World Cup Final	Big Ben	8th	
1986	World Cup Final	Big Ben	2nd place, silver medalist(s)	
1986	World Championships	Big Ben	4th	Team
1986	World Championships	Big Ben	10th	Individual
1987	World Cup Final	Big Ben	5th	
1987	Pan American Games	Big Ben	1st place, gold medalist(s)	Team
1987	Pan American Games	Big Ben	1st place, gold medalist(s)	Individual
1988	World Cup Final	Big Ben	1st place, gold medalist(s)	
1988	Olympic Games	Big Ben	4th	Team
1988	Olympic Games	Big Ben	15th	Individual
1989	World Cup Final	Big Ben	1st place, gold medalist(s)	
1990	World Cup Final	Czar	12th	
1991	World Cup Final	Czar	15th	
1992	World Cup Final	Big Ben	40th	
1992	Olympic Games	Big Ben	9th	Team
1992	Olympic Games	Big Ben	54th	Individual
1993	World Cup Final	Future Vision	37th	
1994	World Equestrian Games	Future Vision	7th	Team
1994	World Equestrian Games	Future Vision	27th	Individual
1996	Olympic Games	Play It Again	16th	Team
1996	Olympic Games	Play It Again	47th	Individual
1997	World Cup Final		28th	
1998	World Equestrian Games	Mont Cenis	10th	Team
1998	World Equestrian Games	Mont Cenis	39th	Individual
1999	Pan American Games	Ivar	3rd place, bronze medalist(s)	Team
1999	Pan American Games	Ivar	1st place, gold medalist(s)	Individual
2000	World Cup Final	Ivar	30th	
2000	Olympic Games	Dorincord	9th	Team
2000	Olympic Games	Dorincord	13th	Individual
2003	Pan American Games	Promise Me	5th	Team
2003	Pan American Games	Promise Me	7th	Individual
2004	Olympic Games	Promise Me	22nd	Individual
2005	World Equestrian Games	In Style	13th	Team
2005	World Equestrian Games	In Style	90th	Individual
2007	Pan American Games	In Style	2nd place, silver medalist(s)	Team
2007	Pan American Games	In Style	4th	Individual
2008	Olympic Games	In Style	2nd place, silver medalist(s)	Team
2008	Olympic Games	In Style	22nd	Individual
2009	World Cup Final	In Style	15th	
2011	Pan American Games	Star Power	4th	Team
2011	Pan American Games	Star Power	24th	Individual
2012	Olympic Games	Star Power	5th	Team
2012	Olympic Games	Star Power	9th	Individual
2014	World Equestrian Games	Dixson	8th	Team
2014	World Equestrian Games	Dixson	36th	Individual
2015	Pan American Games	Dixson	1st place, gold medalist(s)	Team
2015	Pan American Games	Dixson	16th	Individual
EL = Eliminated; RET = Retired; WD = Withdrew

Records
Preceded by (Austria) Hubert Raudaschl	Athletes with the most appearances at Olympic Games; 2012 –	Succeeded by Incumbent
