= Hickstead (horse) =

Famous show jumping horse

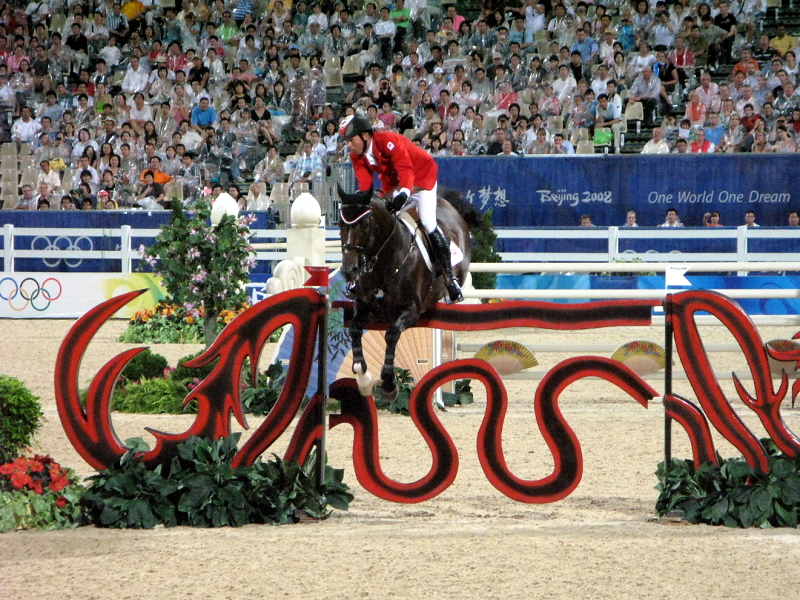
- Hickstead and Eric Lamaze at the 2008 Summer Olympics
- Breed: Dutch Warmblood
- Sire: Hamlet
- Grandsire: Nimmerdor
- Dam: Jomara
- Maternal grandsire: Ekstein
- Sex: Stallion
- Foaled: March 2, 1996
- Died: November 6, 2011
- Country: Belgium
- Colour: Bay
- Owner: Torrey Pines and Ashland Stables Inc

Medal record

Equestrian

Olympic Games
Gold medal – first place	2008 Beijing	Individual jumping
Silver medal – second place	2008 Beijing	Team jumping

World Equestrian Games
Bronze medal – third place	2010 Lexington	Individual jumping

Pan American Games
Silver medal – second place	2007 Rio de Janeiro	Team jumping
Bronze medal – third place	2007 Rio de Janeiro	Individual jumping

Hickstead (March 2, 1996 – November 6, 2011) was a stallion ridden by Canadian Eric Lamaze. With rider Lamaze, he was an Olympic gold and silver medallist in show jumping. Hickstead was owned by Torrey Pines and Ashland Stables Inc.

A Dutch Warmblood, Hickstead was 16 hands (64 inches, 163 cm) high and bay in colour. He was born in Belgium. During his career, he won more than $4 million CDN.

== Career ==
In 2006, Hickstead was a member of the winning Nations Cup Team in Florida. He also placed third in the Aachen Grand Prix and won the Duke Energy Cup at Spruce Meadows.

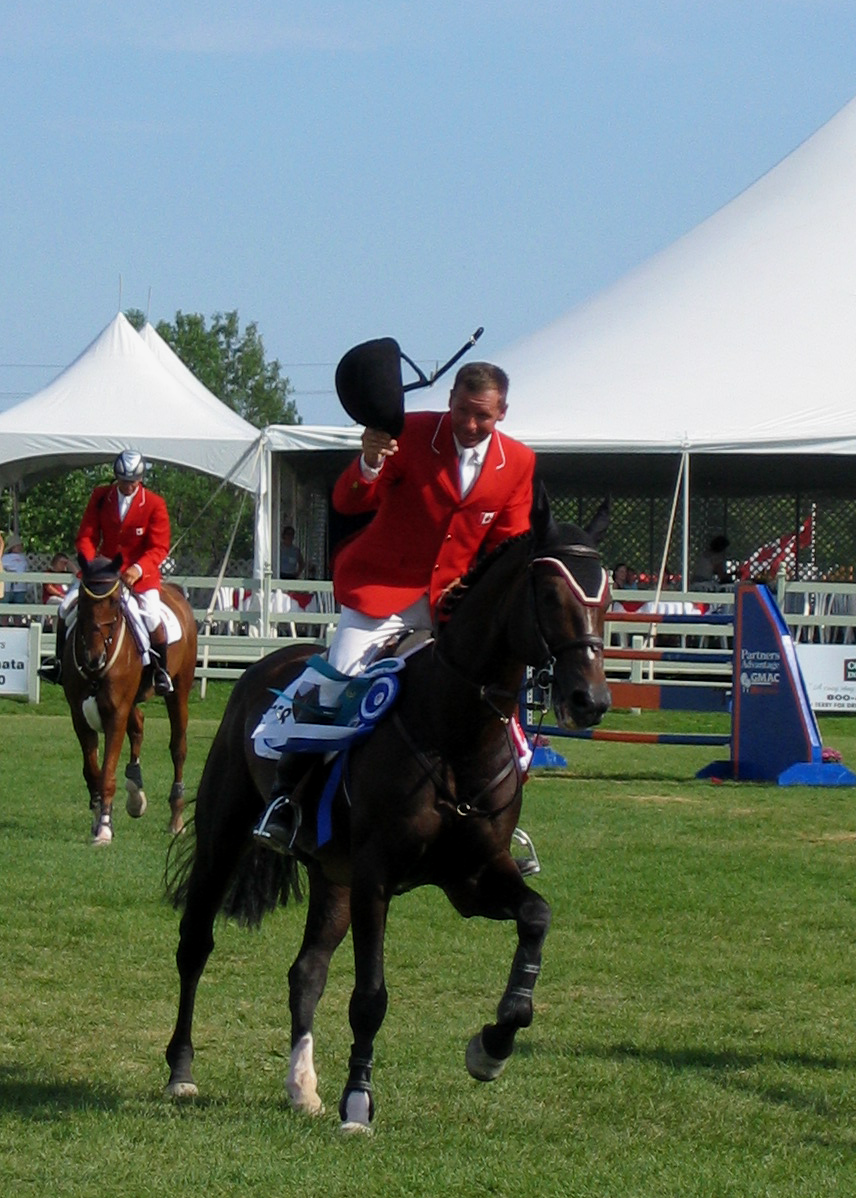
Eric Lamaze and Hickstead, winners of the 2006 Kubota Big Ben Memorial Grand Prix (Nepean National Equestrian Park, Ottawa, Canada).

In 2007 Hickstead and Eric Lamaze won the coveted $1Million CN International at the Spruce Meadows "Masters" Tournament in Calgary, Alberta (Canada). During that event, he also won a record four ATCO Power Queen Elizabeth II Cup titles.

At the 2007 Pan Am Games, Hickstead and Eric Lamaze won team silver and individual bronze medals.

In 2008, Hickstead and Eric Lamaze won Individual Gold and Team Silver for Canada at the Beijing Olympic Games. This was the first individual gold medal won in equestrian, and second overall gold won by Canada in Olympic history, the other being a team medal coming from the 1968 Olympics.

In 2010 Hickstead earned the title 'Best Horse in the World' at the Alltech FEI World Equestrian Games(WEG) in Lexington, Kentucky. After completing the feat of logging four clear rounds with four different riders in the Rolex Top Four Final, Hickstead was named Best Horse of the discipline. Under the unique format of the Top Four Final, riders with the four highest scores throughout the competition exchange horses.

Hickstead and Lamaze were also the 2010 champions of the Rolex Grand Prix at the prestigious CHIO Aachen: World Equestrian Festival in Germany. In a competition where the top three combinations completed both rounds and the jump-off without faults, Hickstead raced to victory – finishing the jump-off in a time that was twenty four one hundredths of a second faster than that of the second place 'Carlina', ridden by Pius Schwizer of Switzerland.

In 2011 Eric Lamaze and Hickstead won the $1 million CN International for a second time. The pair was second in the 2011 FEI World Cup Jumping Final in Leipzig, Germany.

On November 6, 2011, at a competition in Verona, Italy, Hickstead collapsed shortly after finishing a round and died of an aortic rupture. At the time, he was paired with Lamaze, the number one rider in the world. Eric Lamaze had praised this horse in 2006:

He's a great horse and a very good competitor. He's got a great personality, and he's a fun horse to ride because I know him so well. He's feisty, he knows why he is out there, and he knows that knocking down a rail is not good! Some horses just don't get it.

== Reactions to Hickstead's death ==
Hickstead really was a horse in a million and my heart goes out to Eric and everyone connected with this wonderful horse. This is a terrible loss, but Hickstead truly will never be forgotten. We were very lucky to have known him.

— Princess Haya bint Al Hussein, President of the FEI

We are shocked. This horse was in the past few years the measure of all things. (original: Wir sind geschockt. Dieses Pferd war in den letzten Jahren das Maß aller Dinge.)

— Marco Kutscher

Every horseman knows the proverb: For every rider there's one horse, and for every horse there's one rider — and they were that sort of partnership. Hickstead wasn't simply his partner in sport, he was his partner in his life's hopes & ambitions.

— Akaash Maharaj, CEO of Equine Canada

== See also ==
- List of historical horses
