= Eric Lamaze =

Canadian equestrian (born 1968)

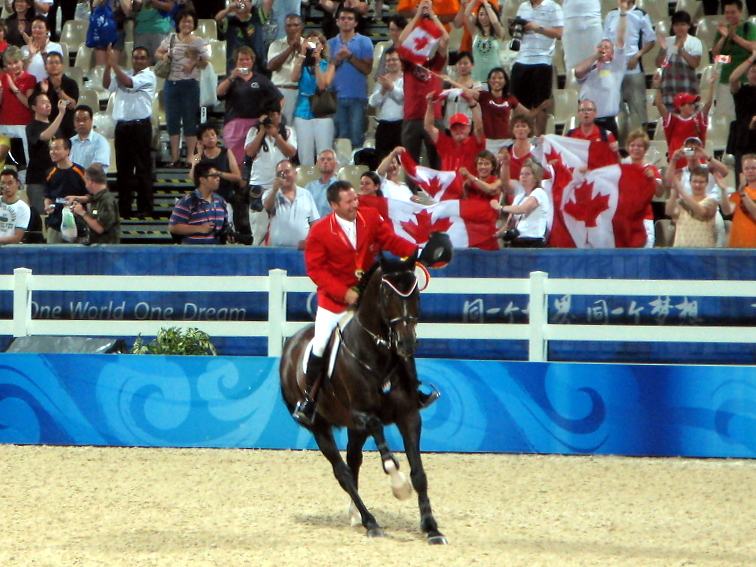

Personal information
- Full name: Eric Lamaze
- Nationality: Canada
- Discipline: Show jumping
- Born: April 17, 1968 (age 58); Montreal, Quebec, Canada
- Height: 5 ft 8 in (1.73 m)
Medal record
Representing Canada
Equestrian
Olympic Games
Gold medal – first place	2008 Beijing	Individual jumping
Silver medal – second place	2008 Beijing	Team jumping
Bronze medal – third place	2016 Rio de Janeiro	Individual jumping
World Equestrian Games
Bronze medal – third place	2010 Lexington	Individual jumping
Pan American Games
Gold medal – first place	2015 Toronto	Team jumping
Silver medal – second place	2007 Rio de Janeiro	Team jumping
Bronze medal – third place	1999 Winnipeg	Team jumping
Bronze medal – third place	2007 Rio de Janeiro	Individual jumping

Eric Lamaze (born April 17, 1968) is a Canadian showjumper and Olympic champion. He won individual gold and team silver at the 2008 Beijing Olympics, riding Hickstead. Lamaze has won three Olympic medals, as well as four Pan American Games medals and one World Equestrian Games bronze. He is considered one of Canada's best showjumpers. He is currently banned from participating in equestrian activities until 2027.

== Early life ==
Lamaze was born in Montreal, Quebec. He started riding at age twelve and worked in exchange for time in the saddle. He was considered a promising junior rider, and trained under Roger Deslauriers, George Morris, Jay Hayes and Hugh Graham.

== Career ==
=== 1991–2006 ===
Lamaze began competing at the grand prix level in 1991 or 1992. A year later, he was named to the Canadian equestrian team. His first major competition as a national team member was the 1994 World Equestrian Games.

Lamaze was named to the Canadian team for the 1996 Summer Olympics in Atlanta, Georgia, but lost his place and received a four-year suspension after testing positive for cocaine. Arbitrator Ed Ratushny overturned the suspension, although Lamaze had already missed the Atlanta Games when the ruling was delivered.

Lamaze rebuilt his career and ascended the rankings, being again regarded as a key member of the Canadian team for the Sydney Games. However he tested positive for a banned stimulant, which resulted in his removal from the team and facing a lifetime ban. Right afterwards, a despondent Lamaze contemplated suicide and while drunk he smoked a cigarette laced with cocaine. Forty-eight hours later, the test for the banned stimulant was reversed on appeal, however Lamaze then tested positive for cocaine which would also have meant a lifetime ban. Arbitrator Ed Ratushny overturned the cocaine test, but the Canadian Olympic Committee refused to reinstate Lamaze on the Canadian team.

=== 2007–2011: Hickstead years ===
In 2007, Lamaze became the first Canadian jumping rider in 20 years to make the top ten in the world rankings. He was also the first North American jumping rider to exceed one million in prize money a year, a third of these earnings the result of winning the CN International Grand Prix at Spruce Meadows. The CN International Grand Prix was Lamaze's first major win with the stallion Hickstead.

Lamaze competed in the Beijing Olympics, riding Hickstead. He was awarded a silver medal after a strong performance in the team event. Lamaze went on to win a gold medal in the individual show jumping event of the 2008 Beijing Olympics at the Shatin Equestrian Venue in Hong Kong as a result of a jump off between himself riding Hickstead and the Swedish rider Rolf-Göran Bengtsson, riding Ninja.

In the January 2009 Rolex World Rankings for show jumping by the International Equestrian Federation, Lamaze was named to the top spot for the first time. In October 2009, Lamaze won the €120,000 Equita Masters in Lyon, France, riding Hickstead.

Lamaze returned to first place in the Rolex Rankings for July 2010. In July that year, he had two major wins with Hickstead, at the Aachen World Equestrian Festival and the Spruce Meadows Queen Elizabeth II Cup.

In 2011, Lamaze and Hickstead won the €200,000 Rome Grand Prix, the €200,000 La Baule Grand Prix, the Spruce Meadows Queen Elizabeth II Cup, the €23,000 1.55m in Rotterdam, the $1 million CN International Grand Prix, and the €100,000 Barcelona Grand Prix.

Hickstead died during an event for the FEI Show Jumping World Cup in Verona, Italy. Lamaze was distraught and considered retirement.

=== 2012–2023 ===
After the death of Hickstead in 2011, Lamaze selected the nine-year-old mare Derly Chin De Muze to ride at the 2012 London Olympics.

In July 2016, he was again named to Canada's Olympic team, serving as the leader following Ian Millar's decision to not compete again. Lamaze rode the Hanoverian mare, Fine Lady 5. As a member of Canada's jumping team, he competed in a climactic jump-off for the bronze medal, which was ultimately won by the German team. Later, he won a bronze medal in the individual jumping event, a single knocked rail preventing him from earning a second gold medal.

In 2017, Lamaze claimed he was diagnosed with brain cancer, which he revealed to the public in 2019. He continued competing for some time, winning a gold medal at the Spruce Meadows Masters tournament in June 2019.

In 2021, he was selected for random drug testing at an event in the Netherlands, which he failed to comply. Also that year he announced that he would not seek to be part of the Canadian Olympic team for the 2020 Summer Olympics in Tokyo, saying that while his health was stable he felt there were too many risks. Lamaze's battle with brain cancer continued, and on March 31, 2022 he announced that he would be retiring from competition in order to focus on his health. He planned to remain as the Canadian showjumping team's chef d'équipe. After announcing his retirement, he said: "I've always said that I will retire under my own terms when the time is right. The situation with my health has forced me to make the decision earlier than I had envisioned, but the silver lining is that I still have the will to win and can contribute to the Canadian team and the sport I love through my new role."

During a lawsuit in 2023, Lamaze testified his brain cancer, a glioblastoma, had shrunk by 2021, which did free him of brain cancer, leaving him only with throat cancer, despite his claims of having brain cancer at the time.

Citing Lamaze's refusal to undertake drug testing and his forgery of medical documents, the FEI banned Lamaze from competition until September 11, 2027.

== Legal issues ==
In 2010, Iron Horse Farm brought a suit against Lamaze for misrepresenting horses he sold to the farm. As the case slowly made its way through the court system, evidence emerged suggesting Lamaze had forged his medical history.

=== Forgery of Cancer Documents ===
In August 2023, it was found that Lamaze had forged medical documents submitted to the Ontario Supreme Court.

As a result of these findings, Lamaze's lifelong attorney, Tim Danson, stepped down as counsel.

It is alleged that Lamaze's ongoing cancer and alleged treatments during his career were faked by Lamaze in order to delay and avoid several ongoing court cases brought against Lamaze in relation to horse sale disputes.

In order to dismiss this allegation that his cancer and health issues are entirely faked, Lamaze would need to produce reliable medical evidence to prove his claims. Lamaze has publicly declined to do so, stating in an 11 September 2023 article:

They want a doctor’s note; have they seen me? People were telling me to go home, every day for years, as I was so sick. People who have never seen me and don’t know, believe what they see online. I’ve always spoken the truth and will continue to.

Lamaze has said he was unaware of letters and documents submitted to the court and cited issues such as data protection relating to his medical records, and the need to protect people who have treated him.

In a Florida lawsuit from November 2023, the judge ruled that Lamaze's conduct to obfuscate his medical condition was fraudulent and deliberate. Lamaze was found liable for $1.4 million in damages for fraud, breach of contract, and breaking Florida law, related to the purchase and sale of two horses.

After nearly 15 years in the court system, in August 2024, a Canadian court found in support of Iron Horse Farm, who brought suit against Lamaze for misrepresenting horses he later sold to the farm. The court ordered Lamaze to return the money for the horse sales, as well as to cover damages and court costs, totaling $786,000. Iron Horse Farm said they did not expect Lamaze would be in a position to pay back the farm for their damages.

== International Championship Results ==
Results
Year	Event	Horse	Placing	Notes
1994	World Equestrian Games	Cagney	7th	Team
1994	World Equestrian Games	Cagney	28th	Individual
1995	World Cup Final	Cagney	18th	
1996	World Cup Final	Rio Grande	RET	
1998	World Cup Final	Cagney	23rd	
1998	World Equestrian Games	Cagney	10th	Team
1998	World Equestrian Games	Cagney	53rd	Individual
1999	Pan American Games	Kahlua	3rd place, bronze medalist(s)	Team
1999	Pan American Games	Kahlua	10th	Individual
2002	World Equestrian Games	Raphael	10th	Team
2002	World Equestrian Games	Raphael	69th	Individual
2003	Pan American Games	Rosalinde	5th	Team
2003	Pan American Games	Rosalinde	18th	Individual
2005	World Cup Final	Tempete v/h Lindehof	16th	
2006	World Equestrian Games	Hickstead	13th	Team
2006	World Equestrian Games	Hickstead	27th	Individual
2007	Pan American Games	Hickstead	2nd place, silver medalist(s)	Team
2007	Pan American Games	Hickstead	3rd place, bronze medalist(s)	Individual
2008	Olympic Games	Hickstead	2nd place, silver medalist(s)	Team
2008	Olympic Games	Hickstead	1st place, gold medalist(s)	Individual
2010	World Equestrian Games	Hickstead	5th	Team
2010	World Equestrian Games	Hickstead	3rd place, bronze medalist(s)	Individual
2011	World Cup Final	Hickstead	2nd place, silver medalist(s)	
2011	Pan American Games	Coriana van Klapscheut	4th	Team
2011	Pan American Games	Coriana van Klapscheut	11th	Individual
2012	World Cup Final	Coriana van Klapscheut	12th	
2012	Olympic Games	Derly Chin de Muze	5th	Team
2012	Olympic Games	Derly Chin de Muze	29th	Individual
2014	World Equestrian Games	Zigali P S	8th	Team
2014	World Equestrian Games	Zigali P S	34th	Individual
2015	Pan American Games	Coco Bongo	1st place, gold medalist(s)	Team
2015	Pan American Games	Coco Bongo	22nd	Individual
2016	Olympic Games	Fine Lady 5	4th	Team
2016	Olympic Games	Fine Lady 5	3rd place, bronze medalist(s)	Individual
2018	World Equestrian Games	Chacco Kid	10th	Team
2018	World Equestrian Games	Chacco Kid	58th	Individual
EL = Eliminated; RET = Retired; WD = Withdrew

== See also ==
- Canada at the 2008 Summer Olympics
