= List of equestrian sports =

Pictogram for Equestrian at the Summer Olympics

Equestrian sports are sports, or more accurately disciplines, that use horses as a main part of the sport. This usually takes the form of the rider being on the horse's back, or the horses pulling some sort of horse-drawn vehicle.

== General ==
- 4-H – Youth development organization
- Equitation – Art or practice of horse riding or horsemanship
- Horse show – Judged exhibition of horses
- Icelandic equitation – Form of horse riding traditional to Iceland
- Jineteada gaucha – Traditional sport of Argentina and the Cono Sur
- Mounted orienteering – Sport of orienteering while riding a horse
- Pleasure riding – Form of equestrianism
- Pony Club – International youth organization
- Sidesaddle – Form of equestrianism
- Sinjska alka – Equestrian competition in Sinj, Croatia
- Techniques de Randonnée Équestre de Compétition – Equestrian discipline
- Trail riding – Traveling on trails and forest roads
- Working equitation – Equestrian discipline

== FEI international disciplines ==
- Combined driving – Sport involving horses pulling carriages
- Dressage – Equestrian sport and art
- Endurance – Equestrian sport
- Eventing – Equestrian triathlon
- Para-equestrian – Type of disability sport
- Show jumping – Competitive equestrian sport
- Equestrian vaulting – Gymnastics and dance on horseback

=== Regional governance ===
- Horseball – Team sport on horseback
- Tent pegging – Equestrian sport

== Olympic disciplines ==
- Dressage – Equestrian sport and art
- Eventing – Equestrian triathlon
- Show jumping – Competitive equestrian sport

=== Paralympic disciplines ===
- Dressage only at the Paralympics; dressage and combined driving at other FEI events

=== Dressage ===
- Doma menorquina – Traditional style of riding of the island of Menorca
- Doma vaquera – Traditional horse riding discipline of Spain

== Racing ==
- Chuckwagon racing – Equestrian rodeo sport
- Flat racing – Equestrian sport
- Harness racing – Form of horse racing that uses a two-wheeled cart
- Point-to-point – Form of horse racing
- Steeplechase – Horse race featuring jumps over obstacles
- Thoroughbred horse racing – Horse racing

=== Other timed events ===
- Gymkhana – Equestrian event
- Skijoring – Winter sport involving being pulled on skis

== English riding ==
- Classical dressage – Art of riding
- Dressage – Equestrian sport and art
- English pleasure – Style of horse show class
- Eventing – Equestrian triathlon
- Field hunter – Type of horse
- Foxhunting – Traditional equestrian hunting activity
- Hunt seat – Competitive equestrian sport
- Saddle seat – Style of horse riding
- Show hunter – Type of competition horse
- Show hunter (British) – Horse type in UK
- Show jumping – Competitive equestrian sport
- Show hack – Type of competition horse
- Team chasing

== Western riding ==
- Cowboy mounted shooting – Type of competitive equestrian sport
- Cowboy polo – Form of polo played mostly in the western United States
- Horsemanship – Use of horses for sport or work
- O-Mok-See – Equestrian event
- Reining – Type of western horse riding competition
- Trail (horse show) – Competitive class in horse shows
- Western dressage – Dressage riding in western tack
- Western pleasure – Competition at horse shows
- Western riding

== Stock handling ==
- Camargue equitation – Traditional horse riding from Camargue region of France
- Campdrafting – Sport involving a horse and rider working cattle
- Charrería – National sport of Mexico
- Coleo de toros – Venezuelan/Colombian sport similar to rodeo
- Cutting – Western-style equestrian competition
- Ranch sorting – Western-style equestrian sport
- Team penning – Western equestrian sport
- Working cow horse – Western-style equestrian competition event

== Rodeo ==
- American rodeo events
  - Barrel racing – Competitive equestrian rodeo sport
  - Breakaway roping – Rodeo event
  - Dally ribbon roping – Team sport in rodeo
  - Goat tying – Youth rodeo event
  - Pole bending – Rodeo event with six poles
  - Saddle bronc and bareback riding – Rodeo event that involves riding a bucking horse
  - Steer roping – Rodeo event
  - Steer wrestling – Rodeo event
  - Team roping – Competitive rodeo team sport
  - Tie-down roping – Rodeo event
- Australian rodeo – Rodeo style in Australia
- Charrería – National sport of Mexico
- Chilean rodeo – Traditional equestrian sport in Chile

== Harness ==
- Ban'ei racing – Form of horse racing
- Combined driving – Sport involving horses pulling carriages
- Draft horse showing – Horse show competition
- Fine harness – American competition with high-stepping driving horses
- Harness racing – Form of horse racing that uses a two-wheeled cart
- Pleasure driving – Horse show class involving horses pulling carts
- Roadster – Horse and pony driving competition
- Scurry driving — High speed obstacle competition

== Team sports ==
- Deporte de lazo – Team sport roping calves in Panama
- Equestrian drill team – Horse teams riding choreographed patterns
- Horseball – Team sport on horseback
- Pato – Team sport played on horseback
- Polo – Equestrian team sport
- Polocrosse – Team sport combining polo and lacrosse

== Regional ==
- Buzkashi – Afghanistan's national sport played on horseback
- Corrida de sortija – Equestrian sport derived from jousting
- Jousting – Martial game between two horsemen wielding lances with blunted tips
- Mounted archery – Using a bow and arrow while riding from horseback
- Mounted games – Equestrian event
- Tent pegging – Equestrian sport
