= Doma menorquina =

Traditional style of riding of the island of Menorca

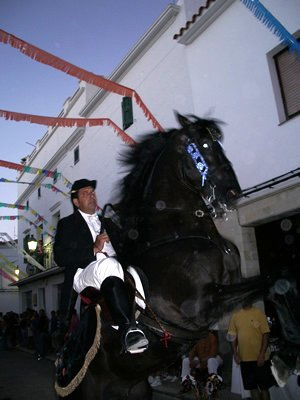
Menorcan horse and rider at Ciutadella de Menorca

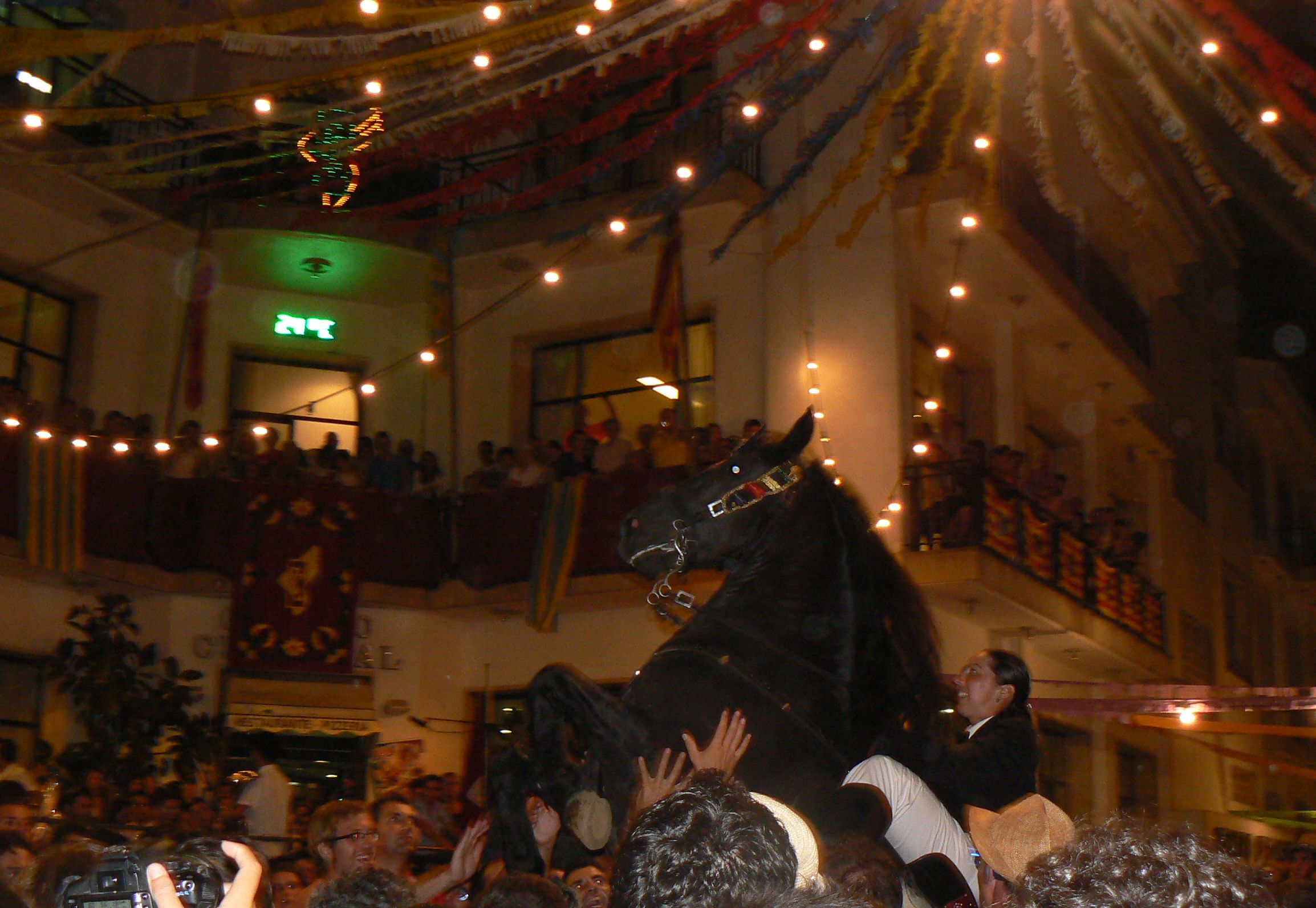
Menorcan horse and rider at Alaior

Doma menorquina is the traditional style of riding of the island of Menorca. It is closely associated with the Menorquín horse.

Doma menorquina is based on classical dressage and resembles a combination of alta escuela and doma vaquera disciplines. Usually, stallions 3–4 years old are trained. From the three basic gaits, walk, trot and gallop, training progresses to the Spanish walk, half pass, flying changes and piaffe and culminates in the bot, or walking courbette. The remarkable ability of Menorcan horses in the bot is the most notable element of Menorcan riding; during the manoeuvre, the rider sits motionless, supported by the rigid back of the sella menorquina, the Menorcan saddle.

Horses and riders are at the centre of local festa celebrations, in a tradition that may go back to the fourteenth century and incorporate elements of Christian, pagan and Moorish ritual. Some 150 riders participate in the festival of Mare de Déu de Gràcia (8–9 September) in Mahón and in that of Saint John the Baptist (23–24 June) in Ciutadella de Menorca. Riders pass through the crowds, executing caracoles and repeatedly performing the bot; the more often it is performed and the greater the distance travelled, the greater the applause of the crowd. Touching the horses is believed to bring good luck. At Ciutadella three types of contest of skill are also held: the ensortilla, in which the rider armed with a lance attempts to take a small ring suspended from a cord; the rompre ses carotes, a jousting contest in which one rider attempts to break a hand-painted circular wooden shield held by the other; and the most dangerous, córrer abraçats, "running embraced", in which two horses gallop with their riders arm-in-arm.

The elevade, in which the horse beats the air with the front hooves, is also a part of the ritual of the festa.
