= Gaucho culture =

Cultural traditions of the South American gauchos

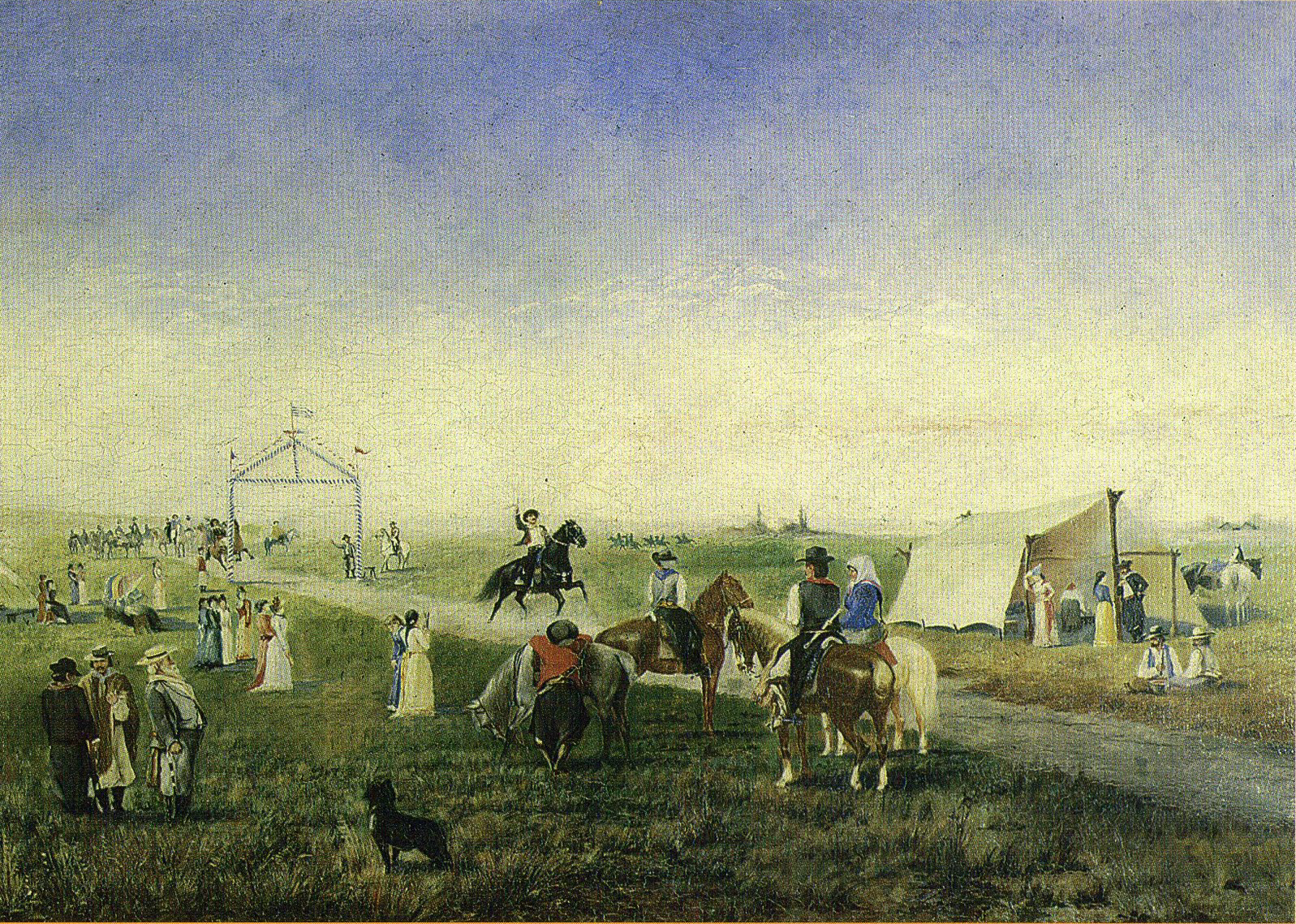
A typical corrida de sortija game as depicted by Horacio Espondaburu.

The Gaucho culture is the set of knowledge, arts, tools, food, traditions and customs that have served as a reference to the gaucho.

Geographically, in the 18th and 19th centuries it was extended by a region of South America that covers much of the territory of Argentina, all of Uruguay, the state of Rio Grande do Sul in southern Brazil and western Patagonia in southern Chile, where it is known as Gaucho culture. In historical gauchos were reputed to be brave, if unruly, the word is also applied metaphorically to mean "Noble, brave and generous", but also "One who is skillful in subtle tricks, crafty". The Gaucho culture has resulted in styles and forms of expression in music, literature and theater is very defined. Some of its main components are related to the importance of rural life of plain, horse, guitar, mate and beef, as well as the values of solidarity, loyalty, hospitality and courage.

Gaucho culture is celebrated in Uruguay at the Fiesta de la Patria Gaucha (Spanish for 'Festival of the Gaucho Homeland').

== Historical review ==
It appeared in the 16th century during the colonization of Spain and Portugal from those regions, acquired its own identity from the special type of livestock rural work that was developed there, because of the multiplication of bovines in the wild, a fact that allowed a wide degree of freedom for those trabajadores.

== Characteristics ==
Characteristics of the rural gaucho culture are expressed in horse, beef, leather, guitar, loneliness, housing (e.g. the ranch), family, stay, work and facón etc.

== See also ==
- Gaucho
- Gaucho literature
- Western lifestyle
