= Hispano-Árabe =

Breed of horse

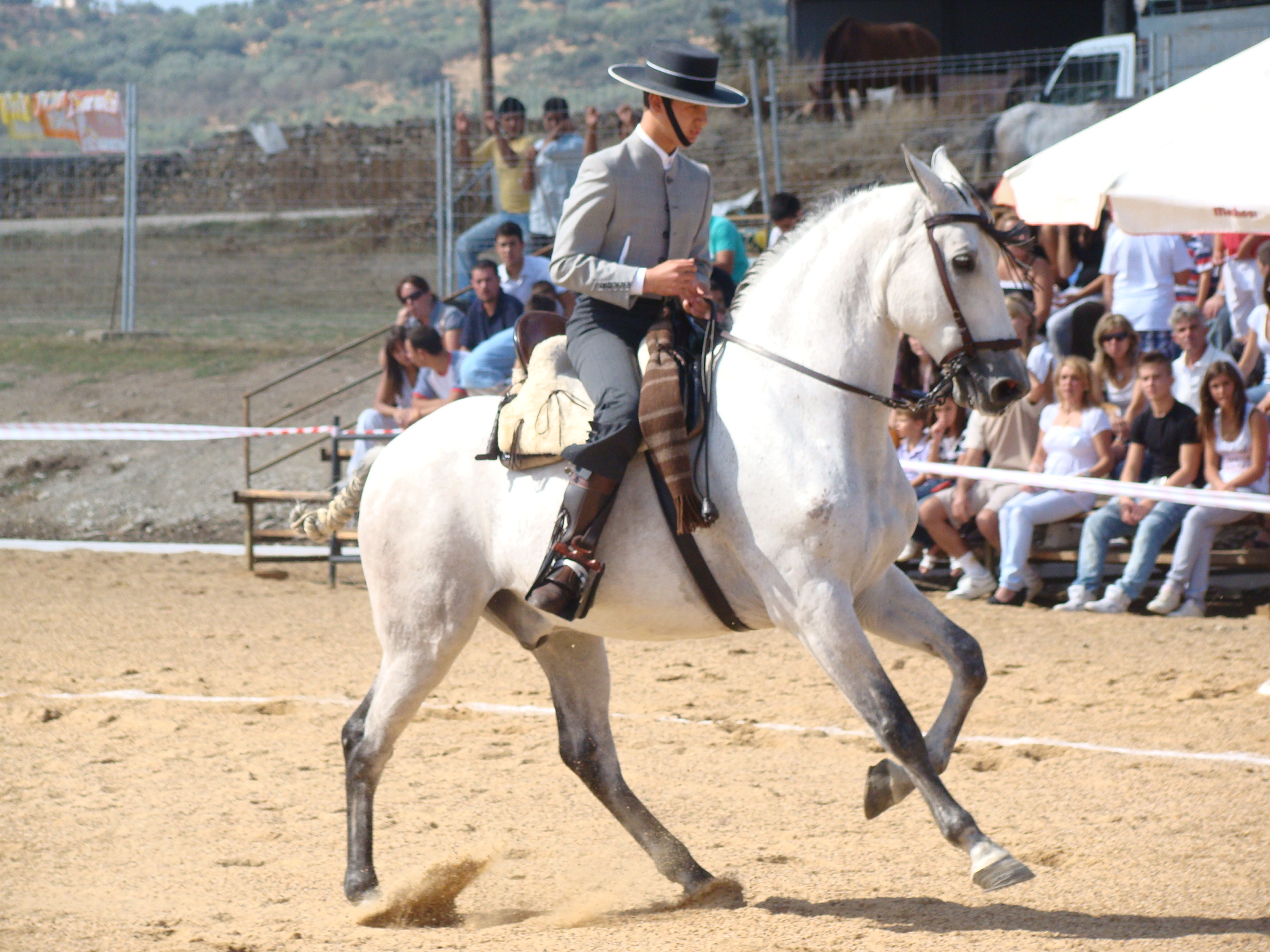
- Country of origin: Spain

Traits
- Weight: Male: 450 kg; Female: 400 kg
- Height: Male: 158 cm; Female: 155 cm

Breed standards
- Ministerio de Medio Ambiente, y Medio Rural y Marino; Andalusian Horse Association of Australasia; British Association for the Pura Raza Hispano-Árabe

The Hispano-Árabe is a Spanish horse breed originating from the cross-breeding of Arab and Andalusian horses.

== History ==
The Hispano-Árabe has been bred in Andalusia since about 1800. The current breed standard was published in 2002, and modified in 2005. Since 2008 the stud book has been held by the breeders' association, the Union Española de Ganaderos de Pura Raza Hispano-Árabe (UEGHá). At the end of 2010, a total of 5835 horses were registered, of which approximately 60% were in Andalusia. The breed is considered a "Raza Autóctona en Peligro de Extinción", or autochthonous breed in danger of extinction.

Hispano-Árabe horses can also be registered with the Andalusian Horse Association of Australasia and with the British Association for the Pura Raza Hispano-Árabe.

== Characteristics ==
The Hispano-Árabe is well-proportioned and harmoniously made, with a slender outline and light movements. Due to the origins of the breed, there is considerable variation in appearance, which however does not in itself constitute a reason for disqualification from registration. It is usually either grey or dark-coloured.

Males average 158 cm (15.2 hands) at the withers and 450 kg (990 lb) in weight; females average 155 cm and 400 kg.

== Uses ==
The Hispano-Árabe is a saddle-horse, suitable for equestrian sports such as acoso y derribo, show-jumping, dressage, cross-country, endurance and TREC; as a working horse for doma vaquera and herding, its traditional use; and for trekking and group sports.
