= Haute école =

Haute école may refer to:

- The haute école (F. "high school"), advanced components of Classical dressage
- The "airs above the ground", dressage movements practiced at classical riding schools such as the Spanish Riding School, Vienna, Austria
- A vocational university
