= Carthusian Spanish horse =

Purebreed Spanish horse in Andalucia

Carthusian horse
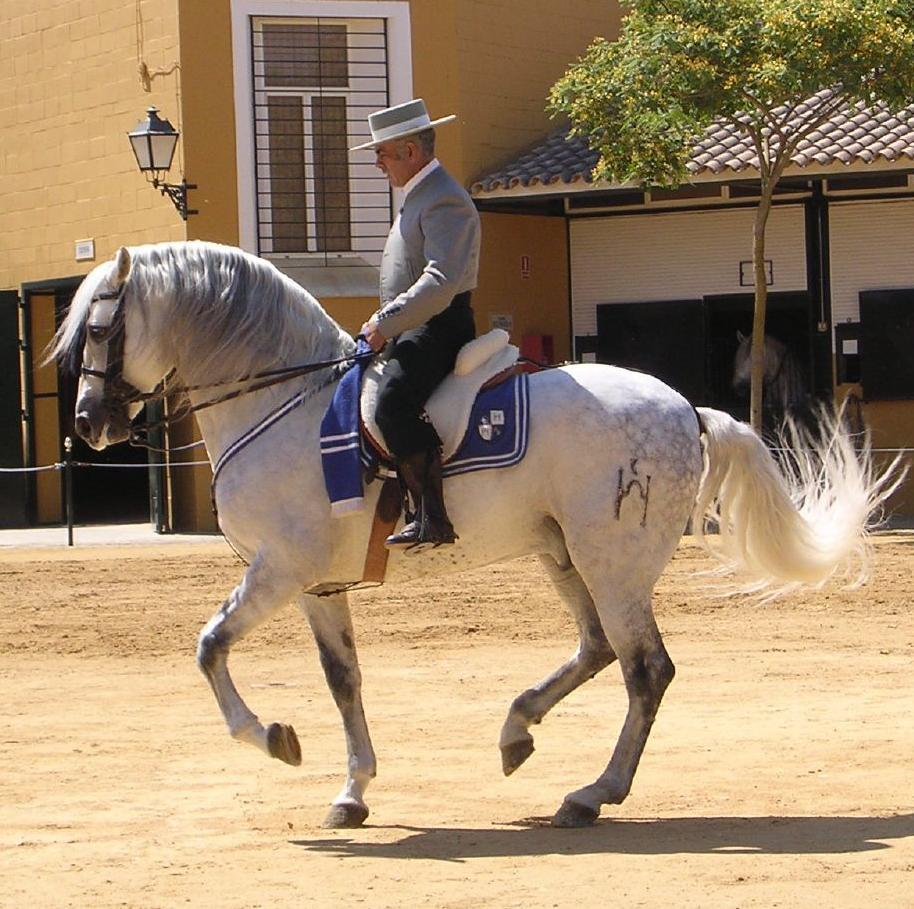
- Country of origin: Spain
- Use: Dressage

Traits
- Height: 1.55 m
- Color: Gray

The Carthusian horse, also known as Cartujano in Spanish, is a bloodline group within the Purebred Spanish horse (PRE). Its lineage can be traced back to 1476, which supports claims that its breed registry is one of the oldest in the world. The Carthusian lineage originates from a gray stallion named Esclavo, who became the property of the Carthusian monks of Andalusia. The monks successfully developed this breeding program, which gained widespread recognition throughout Europe in the 18th century. Morphologically, the Carthusian horse is characterized by a lighter body and a straighter head profile compared to other PRE lines, often exhibiting bony protuberances. The predominant coat color of the Carthusian horse is gray. This breed is commonly utilized in dressage and is well-suited for combined driving. Carthusian breeding is primarily concentrated in its region of origin, Andalusia, particularly around Jerez de la Frontera, Badajoz and Córdoba.

== Etymology ==
The Spanish name for this line, Cartujano, translates into English as Carthusian and into French as Chartreux or Cheval des Chartreux. The Carthusian horse is generally classified as a Purebred Spanish horse (PRE), meaning it is not considered a separate breed but rather a distinguished bloodline within the PRE category.

== History ==
Carthusian performing the Spanish walk

The Carthusian horse is regarded by enthusiasts as a distinguished descendant of the Purebred Spanish horse (PRE), boasting one of the oldest breed registries in the world, with documented lineage tracing back to the 15th century. This lineage has been bred and preserved by Carthusian monks since at least 1476. There was a spiritual dimension to this breeding, as evidenced by an account of the perception of God's face in a horse's eye. These monks exerted a strong influence on horse breeding in their region, and their horses were highly regarded in Christian Europe.

The Yeguada de la Cartuja (Carthusian stud farm), near Jerez, housed over 700 animals in 1700. The Carthusian bloodline was solidified in the early 18th century when brothers Andrés and Diego Zamora acquired a stallion named El Soldado, along with two mares descended from horses purchased by the King of Spain, which had been placed at Aranjuez, one of Spain's oldest stud farms. One of El Soldado's descendants, a dark gray colt named Esclavo, became the founding sire of the lineage. Noted for its qualities during that period, Esclavo was known for its mane and temperament. It has an abundant mane and has an excellent temperament. Notably, he carried what were described as "warts under its tail", which were actually melanomas, and this trait was often seen as proof of descent from Esclavo. Esclavo was sold to Don Pedro Picado in Portugal, but a group of mares he had sired were given to Carthusian monks to settle a debt, around 1736. Other animals from these lineages are absorbed into the main Andalusian breed. The stock given to the monks is bred as a special line, known as the Zamorano. Over the next century, the Carthusian monks fiercely protected this lineage, resisting royal orders to cross their horses with Neapolitan and Central European breeds, although they did introduce Arabian and Barb bloodlines to improve their stock.

Before the Napoleonic Wars, a breeder named Romualdo Carrera bred horses of renown. An emissary of the King of Prussia offered 50,000 reals in 1803 for the purchase of a stallion born in Jerez. The initial stock of Carthusian horses was considerably depleted during the Spanish War of Independence, leaving only one foal from a Carthusian stallion at the Carrera stud. The lineage would have faced extinction if not for the efforts of the Zapata family, leading to the occasional designation of Carthusian horses as "Zapata horses". In 1835, the convent's stud farm was dissolved, and management of the horses was transferred to the Spanish state and select private breeders. The dissolution of the Carthusian religious order established at the Carthusian monastery in Jerez led to the sale and dispersal of the horses to a number of private breeders in the region.

In the 1980s, Carthusian horses became highly sought after in Spain, commanding high prices. The usage of a horse from the lineage by wine merchant Thomas Terry popularized the name "Terry line" for Carthusian horses.

== Description ==
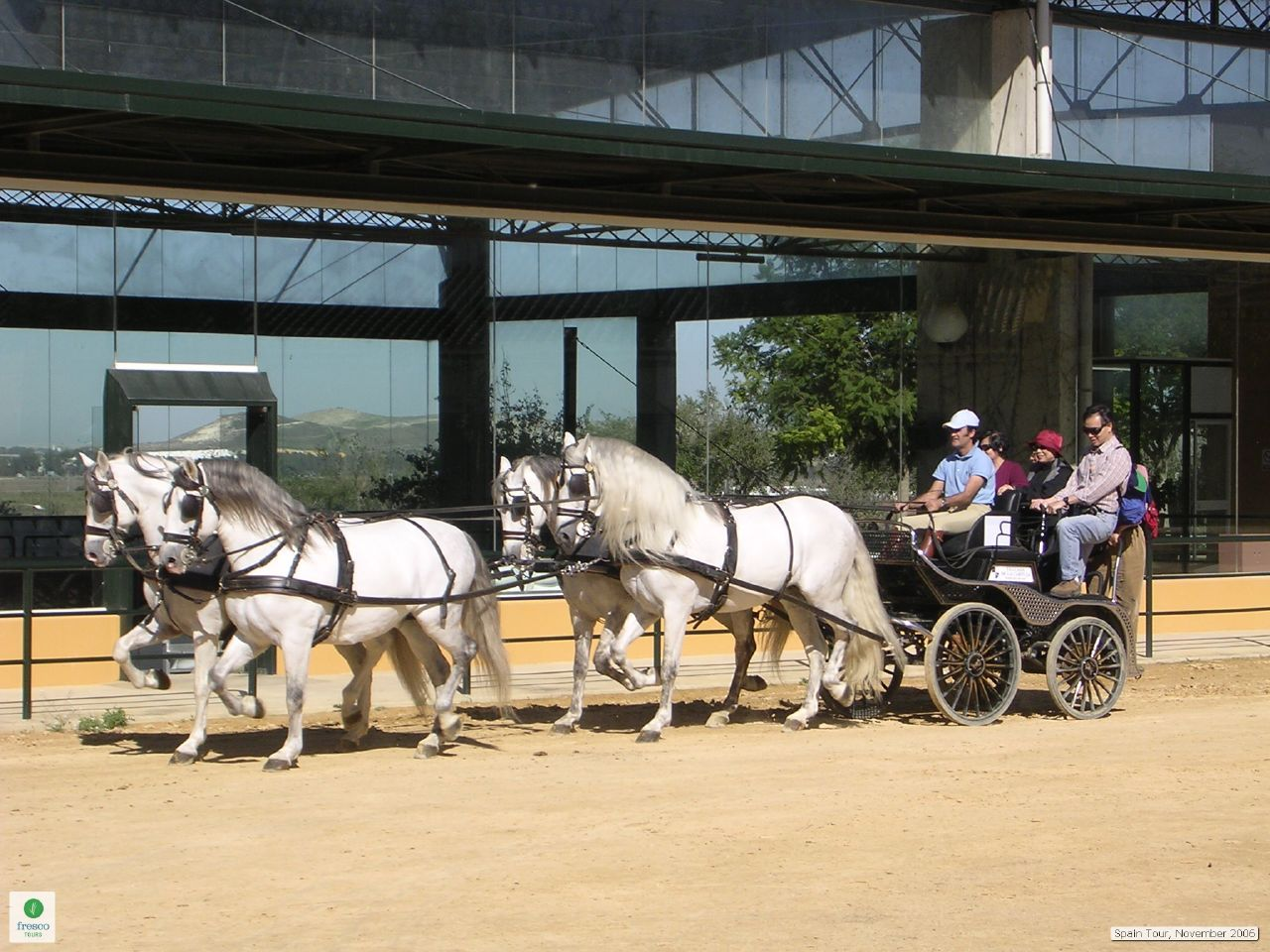
Four Carthusian horses pulling a sports carriage

The Carthusian horse is recognized as a saddle horse that embodies the typical morphology of the Iberian horse. While classified as a line of Purebred Spanish horses (PRE), slight physical differences are noted between Carthusian horses and other PREs. According to a 2007 study by Maurizio Bongianni and the University of Oklahoma study, the average height of Carthusian horses ranges from 1.54 to 1.55 meters (15.2 hands), while a 2016 CAB International study indicated an average height of 1.57 meters. Alberto Soldi reported a range of 1.50 to 1.57 meters in 2014. Overall, the Carthusian horse is lighter and more slender compared to other PREs, characterized by its elegance, strength, and well-conformed body.

Morphologically, the Carthusian is distinguished by a more "oriental" or concave in its head shape. The head is relatively small, light, and well-shaped, often described as rectilinear or slightly convex, and considered more beautiful and noble than in other PREs. The forehead is broad, the ears small and the eyes large and lively. In contrast, non-Carthusian PREs typically exhibit more convex profiles. The nose has a graceful tip, accompanied by small, thin lips. A rare feature is the presence of two small bumps on the bridge of the nose, referred to as "horns", which are calcium deposits located beneath the ears and thought to be inherited from Asian ancestors; however, this characteristic is not a criterion for lineage recognition.

The neck of the Carthusian horse is graceful, muscular, and slightly arched, with a well-proportioned base. The chest is deep, although less so than in other PREs, with sloping shoulders and a broad thorax. The withers are fairly low. The back is rather short and straight. The rump is round or sloping, with the tail set fairly high, carried raised in movement. The forearms are well-defined, and the legs are strong with well-defined joints, ending in relatively small hooves with solid horns.

Known for their athleticism, Carthusian horses are also recognized for their docile and quiet temperament. They are recognized for their movements, the quality of their walk, and the cadence of their gallop.

Carthusian horses have traditionally been branded. The original Carthusian monk's mark, representing a bell, was replaced in the 18th century by a bit-shaped mark.

=== Coat ===
Carthusian horses are predominantly gray, a trend attributed to the use of two breeding stocks with this coat color in the first half of the 20th century. There are also individuals with chestnut, black, and bay coats. Other PREs are more likely to feature coat colors such as bay. In evaluations of Andalusian horses by show judges, the gray coat color is often associated with better ratings by the same judges. In fact, the majority of horses elected Spanish champions are gray Carthusians.

=== Genetics and hematology ===
Most contemporary Carthusian horses are descendants of Esclavo. A genetic study carried out in 2006 identified no genetic differences between Carthusian and other Purebred Spanish horses. The study recommended crossbreeding between Carthusian and non-Carthusian PREs to maintain the genetic diversity of the lineage. Carthusian have been favored in Purebred Spanish breeding, leading to a high proportion of ancestry from a small number of breeding horses, which may have limited PRE genetic diversity. A 2005 study compared the genetic distance between Carthusian horses and other PREs. They calculated a fixation index (F_{ST}) based on pedigree information. The distinction between the two is not supported by genetic evidence.

Additionally, hematology studies involving approximately forty-four Carthusian mares indicated significant variations in blood composition with age, particularly noticeable after the age of 13.

== Usage ==
The Carthusian horse, classified as both a saddle horse and a light draft horse, has traditionally been favored for riding, particularly among nobility and high-ranking clergy. Its use as a horse-drawn vehicle was reserved for exceptional ceremonies. Since then, it has been bred for its "grace", particularly for dressage practice.

The Carthusian has influenced the Paso Fino breed found in South America.

== Distribution ==
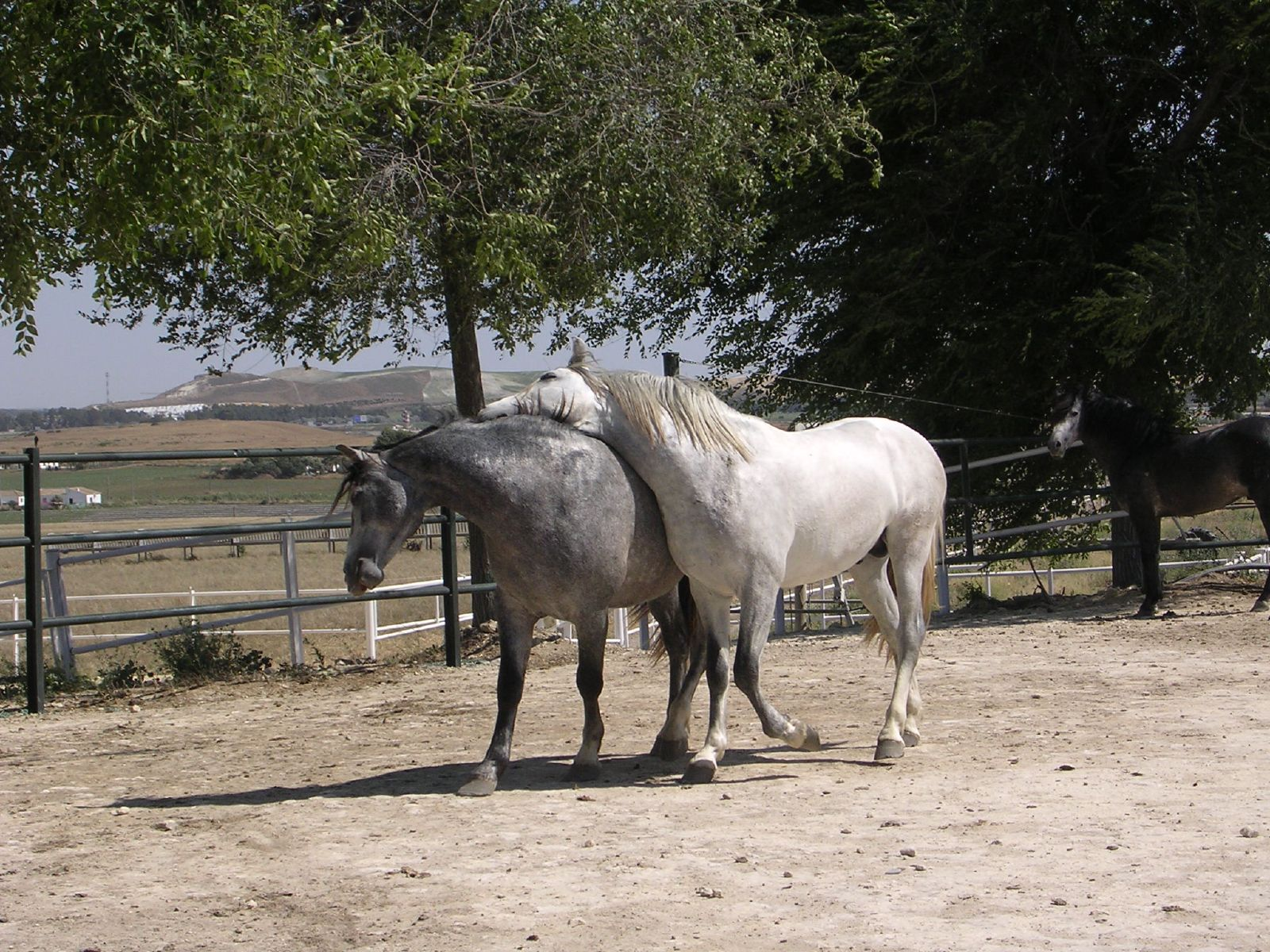
Carthusian foals at a stud in Andalusia

Many Spanish breeders claim to possess Carthusian bloodlines, although pure Carthusians are relatively rare. They account for approximately 12% of registered Andalusian horses since the establishment of the studbook in the 19th century. Currently, they represent only 3.6% of all breeding stock but make up 14.2% of stallions actively used for breeding. The Carthusian strain is bred at state stud farms around Jerez de la Frontera (such as the yeguada del Hierro del Bocado) Badajoz and Cordoba, as well as by several private families. Since 1990, the National Stud of La Fuente del Suero, created near the Jerez de la Frontera Charterhouse, has been preserving the lineage. Carthusian horses generally fetch a higher price than other PREs, as a gray Carthusian is considered more valuable than a non-gray and/or non-Carthusian horse.

The Carthusian, along with the Moyle and the Chinese "dragon horse", is notable for featuring bony protuberances on the muzzle. This has led to the hypothesis that American Moyles may be descended from Carthusian horses.

== In the culture ==
Thomas Terry, a member of the Marbella Club and a wine and spirits merchant, is also a breeder of Carthusian horses. In 1962, he selected his finest stallion, Nico, to represent the Terry Centenario brand. This notable horse plays an important role in promoting the brand.

== See also ==
- List of Iberian horse breeds
- List of horse breeds
- Order of Carthusians

== Bibliography ==
- Benítez, Manuel (1994). El caballo en Andalucía : orígenes e historia, cría y doma (in Spanish) (2nd ed.). Ediciones Agrotécnicas.
- Bongianni, Maurizio (1988). Simon & Schuster's guide to horses & ponies of the world. Translated by Dejey, Ardèle. New York: Simon & Schuster. ISBN 0-671-66067-5. OCLC 16755485.
- de Laiglesia y Darrac, Francisco (1831). Memoria sobre la cria caballar de España. Amarita.
- Hendricks, Bonnie (2007). International Encyclopedia of Horse Breeds (2nd ed.). University of Oklahoma Press. ISBN 978-0-8061-3884-8.
- Kholová, Helena (1997). Chevaux (in French). Translated by Dubourg-Savage, Marie-Jo. Gründ. ISBN 2-7000-1832-X.
- Mandina, Maria Laura (2008). Are negative breeding traits in Andalusian horses correlated with coat color and Carthusian ancestry ? (PDF). Florida Atlantic University.
- Porter, Valerie; Alderson, Lawrence; Hall, Stephen; Sponenberg, Dan (2016). Mason's World Encyclopedia of Livestock Breeds and Breeding (6th ed.). CAB International. ISBN 978-1-84593-466-8.
- Ripart, Jacqueline (2001). Chevaux du monde (in French). La Martinière. ISBN 2-7324-2738-1.
- Rousseau, Elise (2014). "Pure race espagnole". Tous les chevaux du monde (in French). Delacheau et Nietslé. p. 544. ISBN 978-2603018651.
- Soldi, Alberto (2014). "Certosino". Cavalli: Conoscere, riconoscere e allevare tutte le razze equine più note del mondo (in Italian). De Agostini. ISBN 978-8841876909.
