= Mezair =

Mezair may refer to:

- Hichem Mezaïr, an Algerian footballer
- One of the Airs above the ground or school jumps performed by horses in classical dressage.
