= Acoso y derribo =

Spanish traditional equestrian sport

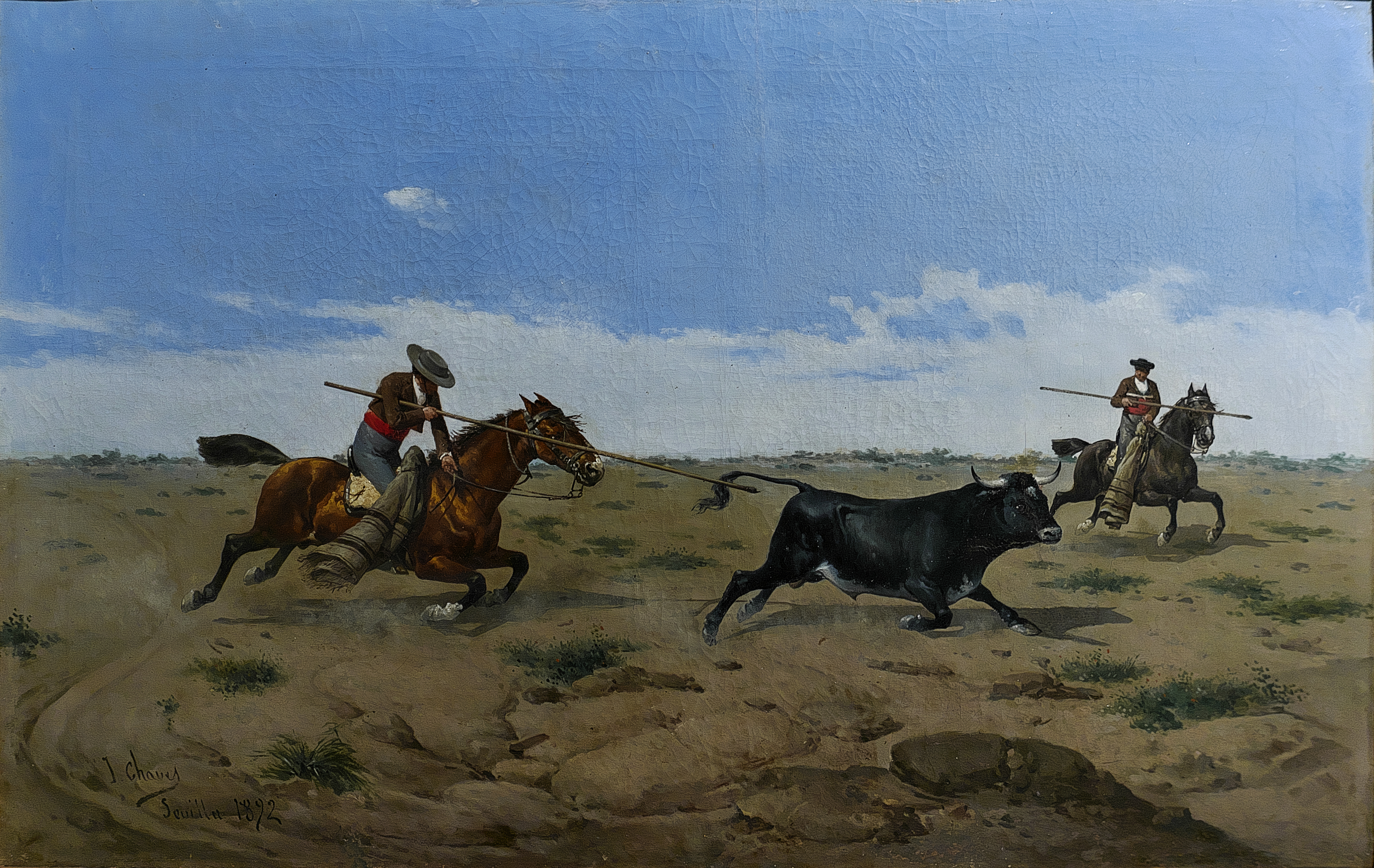
Painting by José Chaves Ortiz, 1892

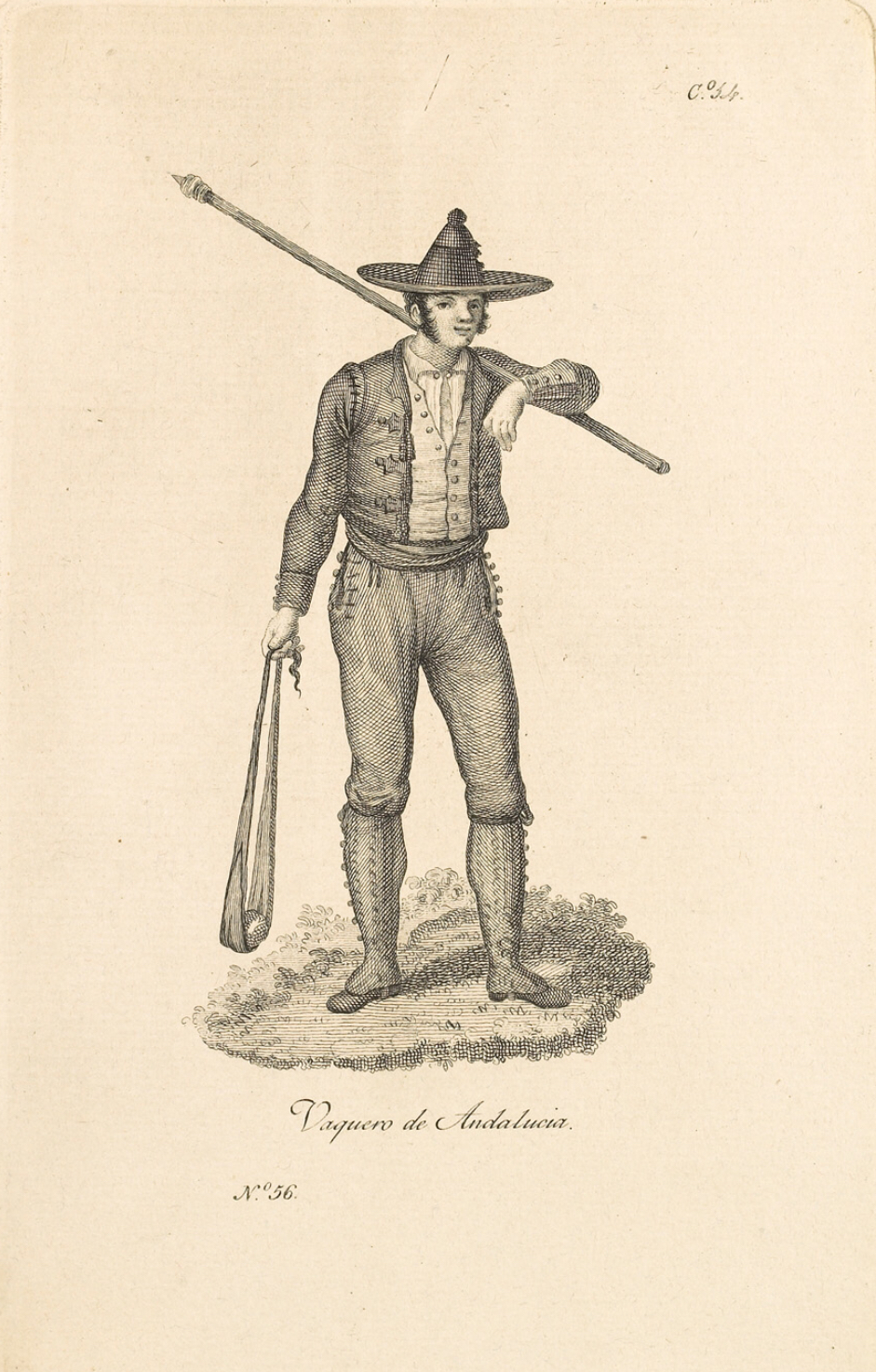
Andalusian Vaquero (1825). A Spanish vaquero or garrochista, uses a “garrocha” or lance and a “honda’ or sling to herd cattle.

Acoso y derribo is traditional sport in the doma vaquera equestrian tradition of Spain, in which cattle are brought to the ground by two riders, the garrochista and the amparador, using the garrocha or lance. The horses used are often of tres sangres (Andalusian x Arab x Thoroughbred) or Hispano-Árabe stock.

== History ==
The practice of acoso y derribo derives from the tentaderos, traditional tests of fighting spirit in fighting cattle, and dates from the mid-nineteenth century. The first national championship took place in Salamanca in 1970.

In 2010 the Real Federación Hípica Española resolved to eliminate this competition from its official list of equestrian sports.

== Competition ==
The field for the competition is divided into four areas: the corrales de querencia or holding pens for the cattle; the rodeo, where the cattle are held at the start of the competition; the corredero, where the garrochista and the amparador perform the acoso, driving the target animal at high but controlled speed to the cuadrilatero or soltadero, where the garrochista performs the derribo, bringing the animal to the ground.
