= Fiesta de la Patria Gaucha =

Folk event in Tacuarembó, Uruguay

Festival of the Gaucho Homeland Fiesta de la Patria Gaucha
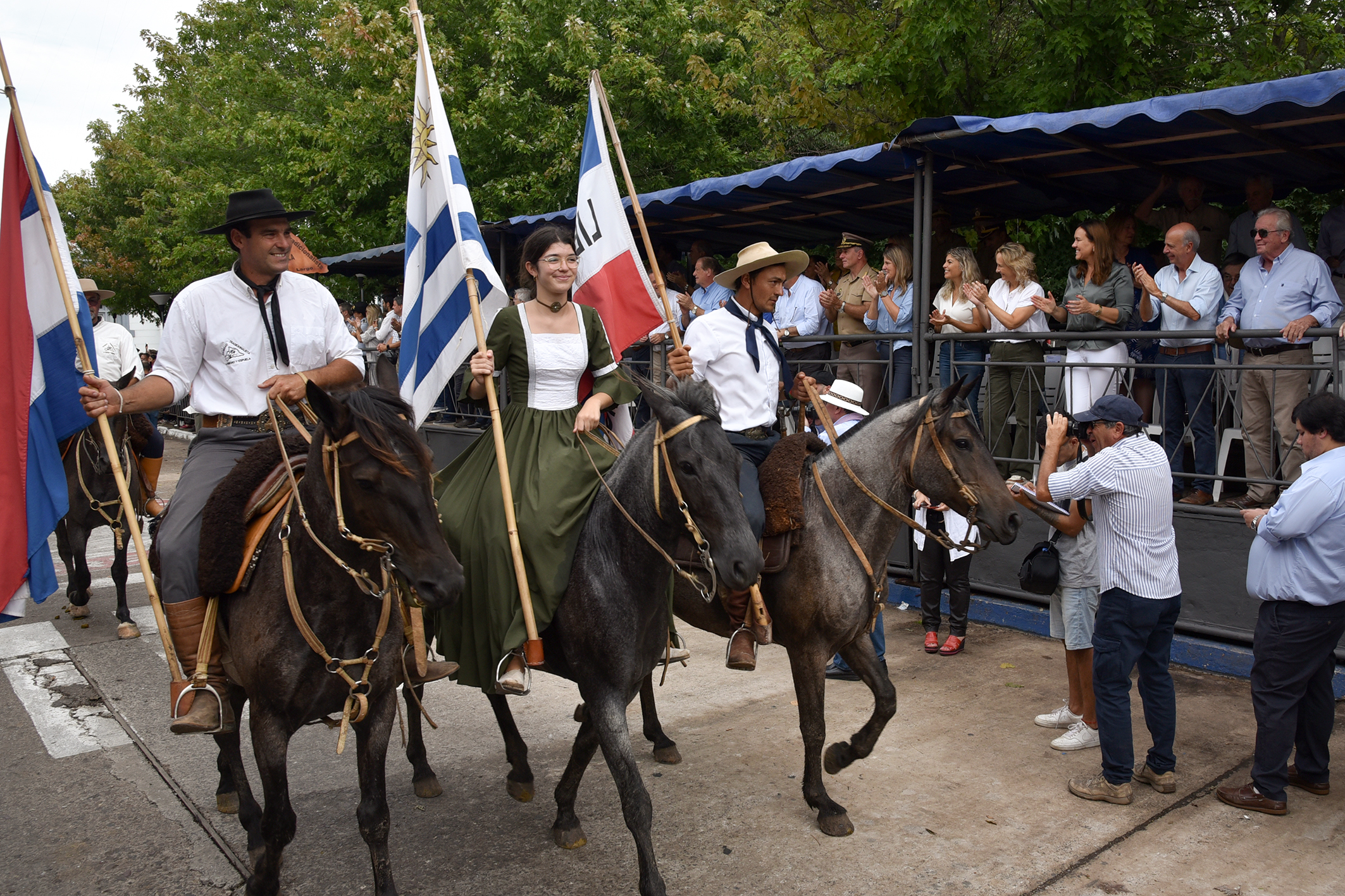
- Traditional parade
- Genre: Rodeo, fair and cultural heritage festival
- Dates: 9 days in March; 2026: March 7–15
- Locations: Tacuarembó, Uruguay
- Founded: 1986; 40 years ago
- Website: www.patriagaucha.com.uy

The Festival of the Gaucho Homeland (Spanish: Fiesta de la Patria Gaucha) is an annual festival held in early March in Tacuarembó, Uruguay. The nine-day event celebrates the traditions, customs, and cultural expressions of the Gaucho heritage, regarded as a national symbol in Uruguay. Featuring rodeos and equestrian parades, stage performances, diverse musical concerts, and demonstrations of traditional gaucho life, the event is a significant celebration reflecting the country’s identity.

== History ==
The Fiesta de la Patria Gaucha was first conceived on December 18, 1986, when the Tacuarembó Department Legislature unanimously approved a bill aimed at highlighting the local gaucho identity through the participation of local representatives and nativist societies.

The first edition was held from February 13 to 15, 1987, coordinated by the Departmental Tourism Commission. From the second edition onwards, the municipal executive took over the organization, appointing the commission members annually, which include municipal officials, professionals, and representatives of criollo societies. The festival’s name reflects Tacuarembó’s location within the area historically associated with the gaucho heritage of southern Brazil, Uruguay, and the Argentine littoral, known as the Patria Gaucha (Spanish for 'Gaucho Homeland').

Over time, the event has evolved into a widely attended cultural gathering, incorporating a diverse range of performances and recreational activities. It has become a central point for the expression and preservation of gaucho heritage, attracting participants and audiences from across the region. Additionally, it has developed into a significant source of economic activity for the city, contributing to local commerce and tourism.

== Events ==
=== Equestrian parade ===
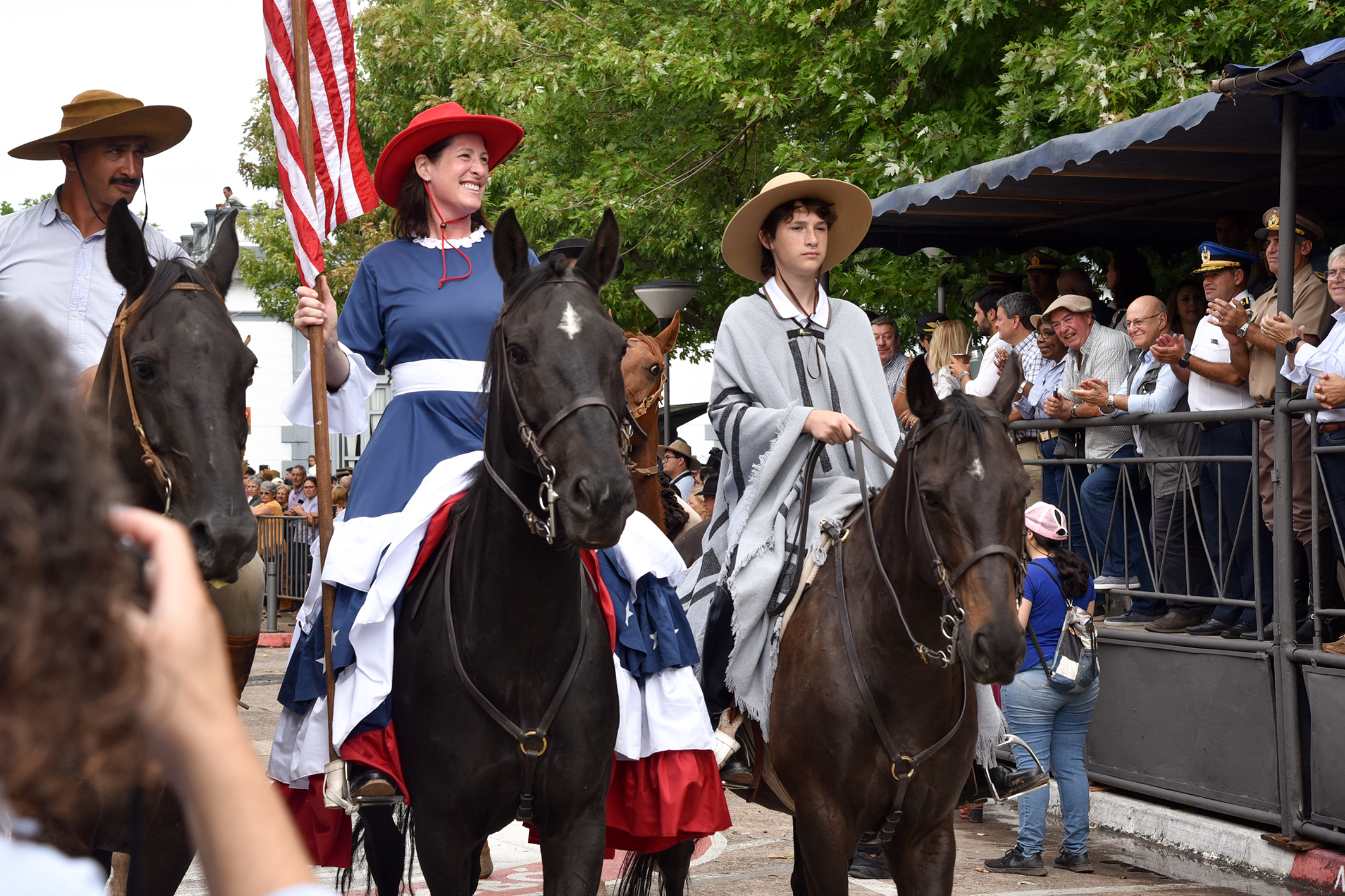
U.S. Ambassador Heide B. Fulton riding on horseback during the main traditional parade, 2024

The Festival begins with the traditional parade of horses, riders, and historic carriages adorned in traditional gaucho attire. Approximately 4,000 horses traverse the city of Tacuarembó, ridden by members of various Sociedades Criollas (Spanish for 'Criollo Societies'). These societies are associations of aparcerías, which are landholdings traditionally worked under a sharecropping system.

The parade occasionally includes the presence of notable representatives from diplomatic, political, and institutional spheres. Along the main avenue, an official stand is established to host authorities, among them the President of the Republic and high-ranking officials.

=== Fogones ===
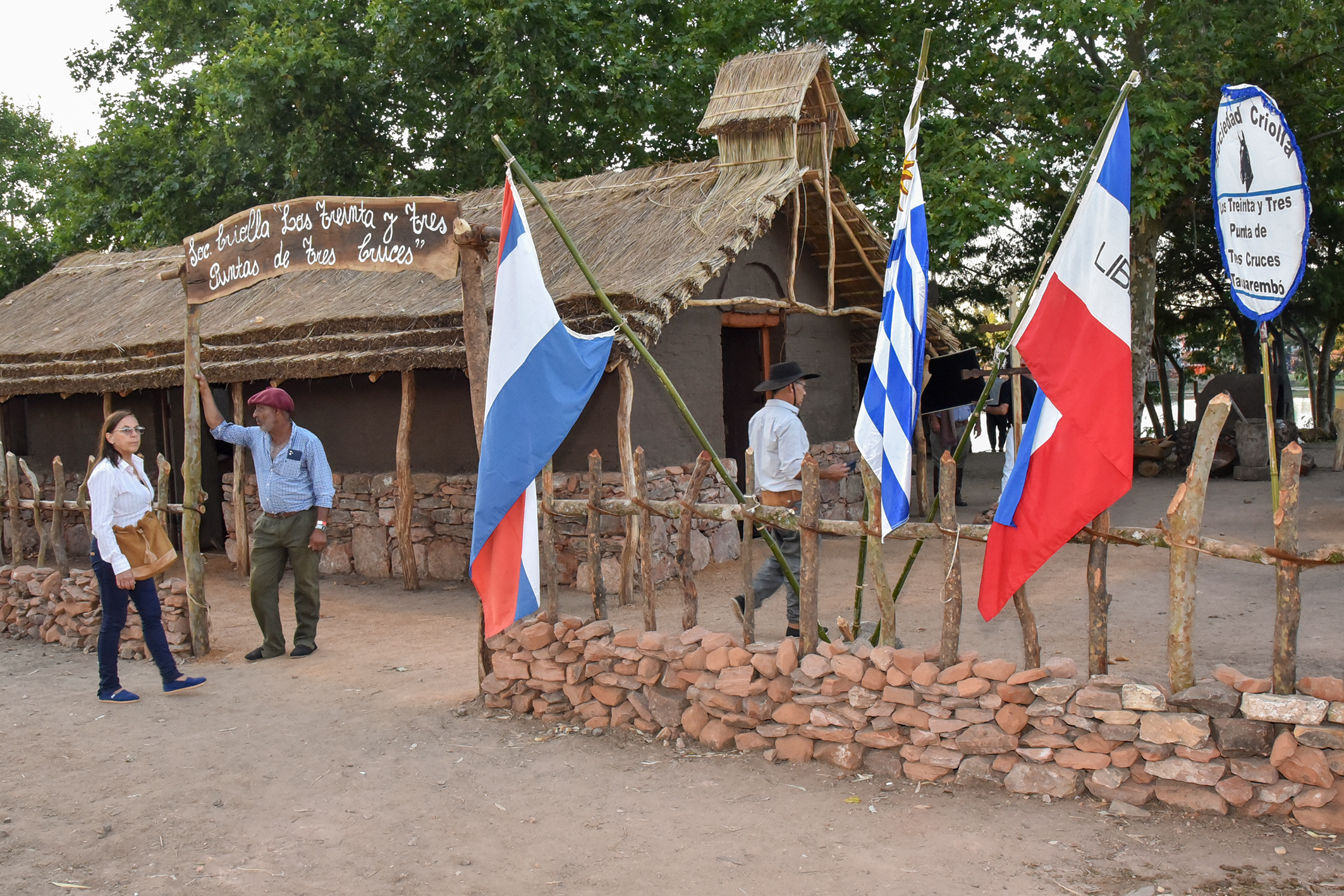
A fogón (Note: “Fogón” is the singular form of “fogones,” referring to individual gaucho homestead exhibits that recreate rural estates and small settlements.) at the 37th edition of the Fiesta de la Patria Gaucha

One of the central features of the event is the construction of the fogones—gaucho homestead exhibits. Within Criollo Societies, aparcerías construct full-scale recreations of rural estates and small settlements, showcasing the architecture, livestock, and lifestyle of the gaucho from the colonial period through the late 19th century. These exhibits include reconstructed homesteads, schools, churches, and other village structures, furnished with period-appropriate tools and household items to illustrate daily life, and are presented for public viewing. Additionally, the event features an official competition among the participating fogones.

=== Rodeo ===
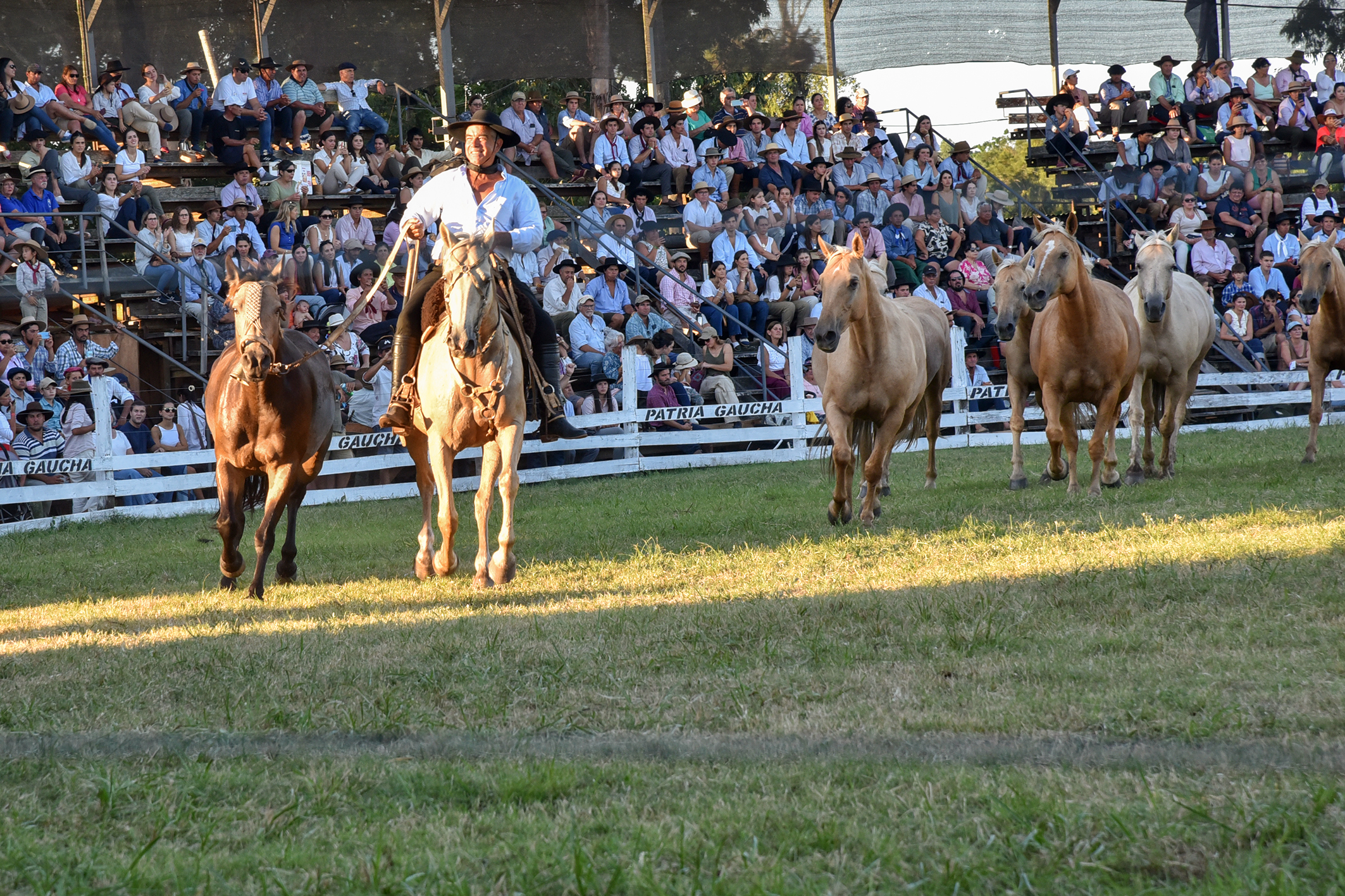
Rodeo

A central feature of the event is the rodeo, where the traditional Jineteada gaucha takes place. In this competition, riders mount Criollo horses and must remain on them while performing sudden movements and jumps, typically using the Basto Oriental, a traditional Uruguayan saddle designed to provide stability and safety during the ride.

In addition to the traditional jineteada, the rodeo also includes other competitions, such as roping, a discipline in which the rider, mounted on a horse, must throw a lasso to catch an animal, usually a calf or cow.

=== Stage performances ===
The festival grounds of Patria Gaucha feature several stages where traditional dance performances and Uruguayan folk music are performed. These stages serve as central gathering points for attendees and host performances by both Uruguayan and international artists in various genres, occurring alongside the rodeo and other competitions. In each edition, a beauty pageant is held among the sociedades criollas to select the Reina del pago (Spanish for 'Queen of the Region').

=== Other events ===
Patria Gaucha features a variety of exhibition stands presenting agricultural products, livestock-related services, machinery, and artisanal goods, as well as displays of Uruguayan cuisine. One of the central elements of the festival is a competition among sociedades criollas, which compete for a final prize. Nighttime activities include open-air dance events. A Catholic service known as the “misa criolla” is also held as part of the program.
