= Moyle horse =

Breed of horse

The Moyle is a rare riding horse breed suitable for ranch work and trail riding. It is believed to be descended from horses bred by Mormon settlers in Utah from Mustangs and Cleveland Bay lines, developed into its modern form by Rex Moyle. At present, there is no registry or breed association for these horses.

== Characteristics ==
Moyle horses often have small frontal skull bosses, referred to as "horns" on their foreheads, a trait seen only in a few breeds, such as the Carthusian horse of Spain. They are also noted for unusual freedom of movement in the shoulder, associated with the positioning of their forelegs a bit further forward than other breeds.

The Moyle is most commonly brown or bay, but comes in almost all solid coat colors. They rarely have face or leg markings.

== History ==
The breed is thought to have origins in the horses bred by Mormon people in Utah during the mid-1800s, and it is believed that the Moyle horse of today was bred by Rex Moyle in the mid 20th century, incorporating Mustangs and Cleveland Bay into the lineage. DNA studies in the 1990s indicated that the Moyle horse has genetic markers suggesting some common ancestry with the Spanish Horse.
