= Jineteada gaucha =

Traditional sport of Argentina and the Cono Sur

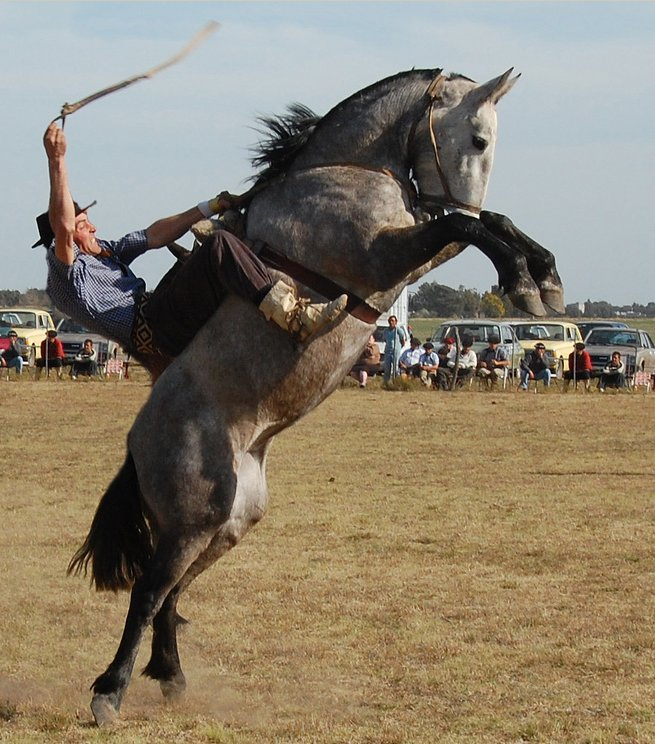
Jineteada gaucha in Argentina

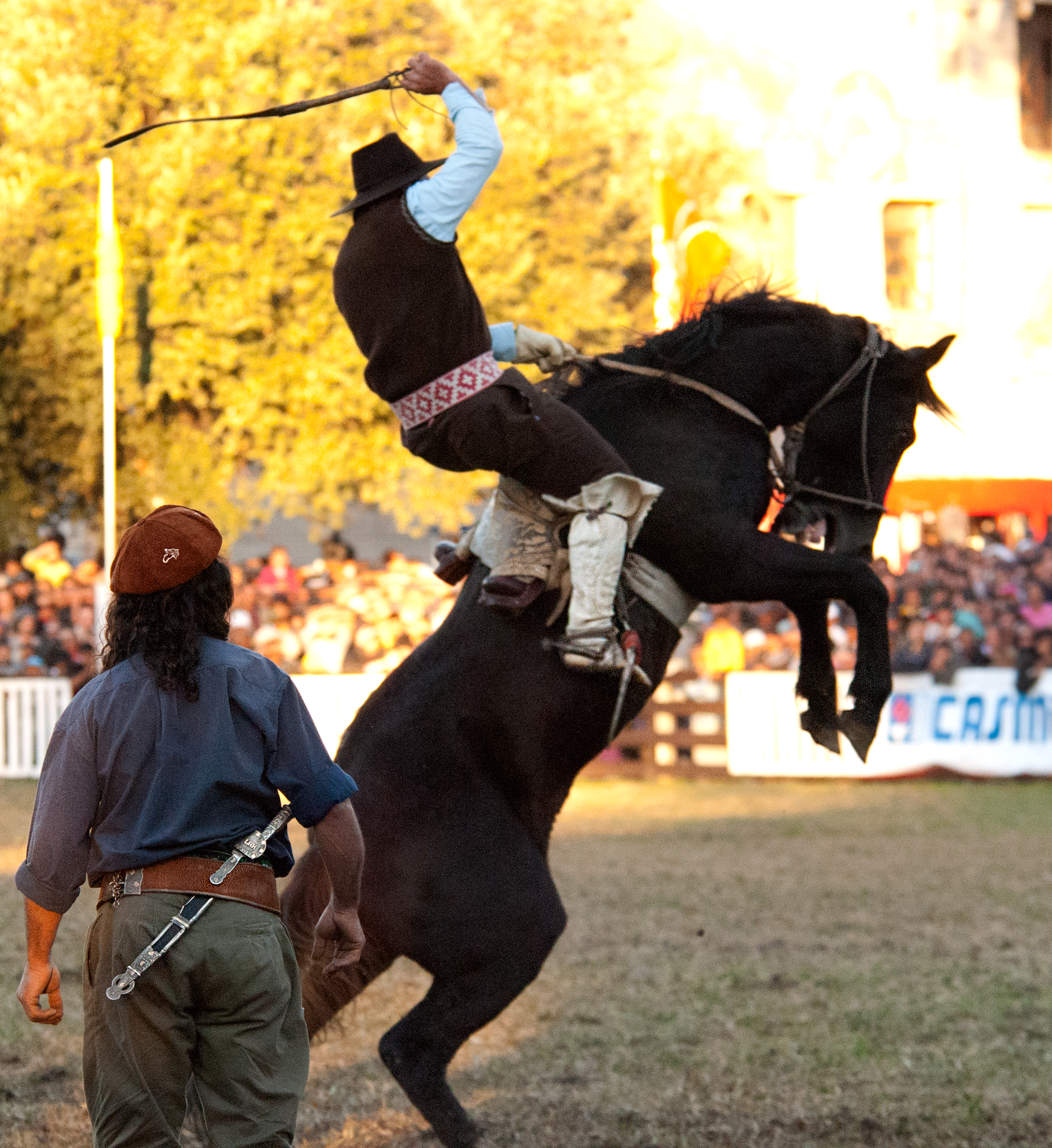
Jineteada in the Criolla del Prado in Montevideo, Uruguay

Jineteada gaucha or doma gaucha is a traditional sport in the gaucho culture of the Cono Sur – Argentina, Uruguay and the Rio Grande do Sul of southern Brazil. The objective is for the rider to stay on an untamed horse for a number of seconds. The specified time varies from 8 to 14 seconds, depending on the category. In Argentina it may be considered a part of the national intangible cultural heritage. A law enacted in Uruguay in 2006 established "las destrezas gauchos" as the national sport.

The event forms part of the programme of the annual Festival Nacional de Doma y Folklore held at Jesús María in the province of Córdoba. Under the rules of the competition there, there are three categories:

- Crina Limpia or bareback: the rider holds on to a leather strap passed round the neck of the horse and must stay mounted for 8 seconds; spurs are used.
- Sureña or Surera: the horse carries a girthed pad of sheepskin in the place of a saddle; the rider holds the reins in one hand, a whip in the other and must stay mounted for 12 seconds.
- Bastos con Encimera: the horse is saddled; the rider must not lose the stirrups and must stay mounted for 14 seconds.

The rider may not touch the horse with his/her hands at any time.

Jineteada gaucha is a central part of the Fiesta de la Patria Gaucha in Uruguay.

== See also ==
- Sport in Argentina
- Chilean rodeo
- Rodeo
- Bronc riding
