= Icelandic equitation =

Form of horse riding traditional to Iceland

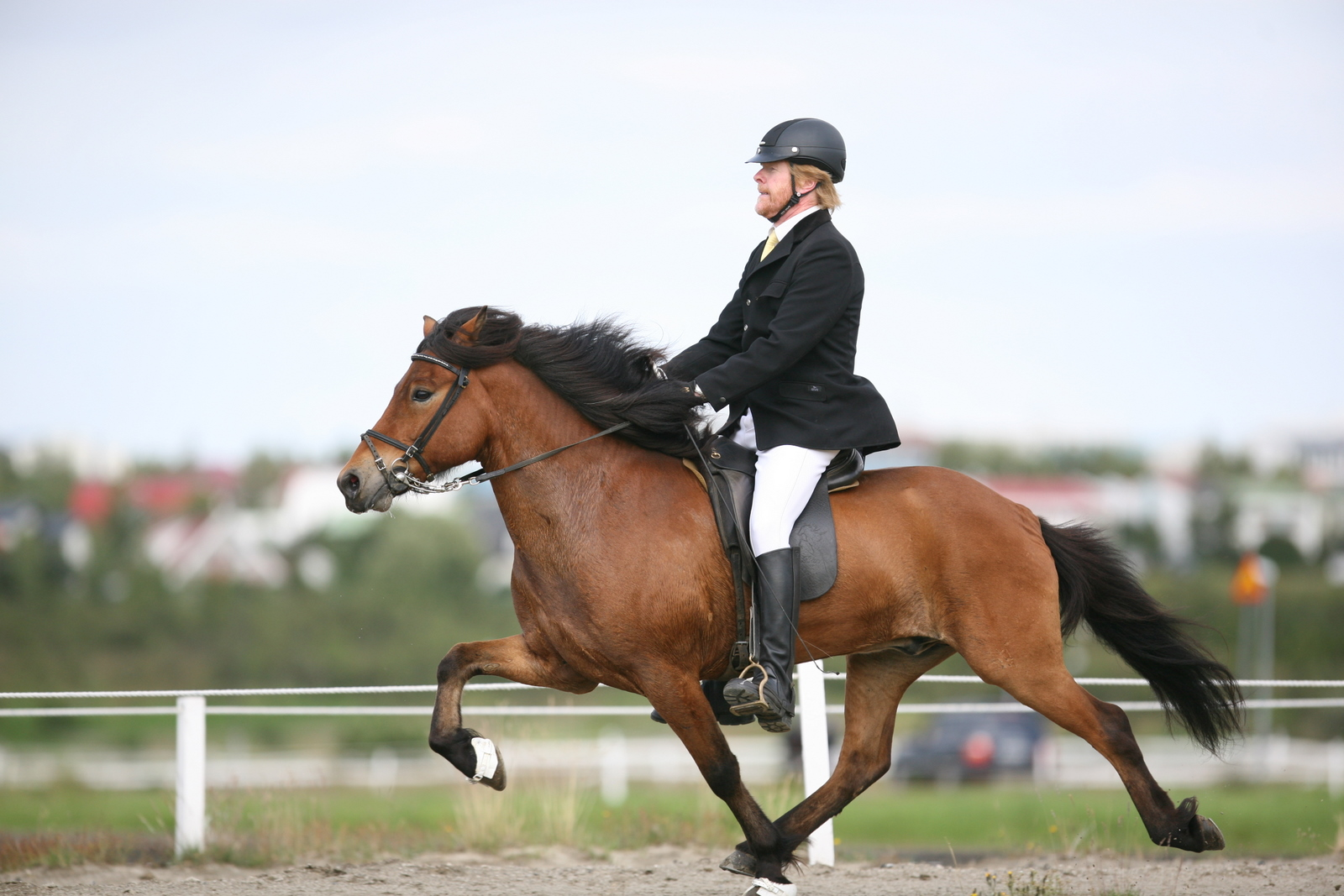
Performing tölt. The curb bit is of traditional Icelandic design.

Icelandic equitation is the traditional style of riding of Iceland. It is closely associated with the Icelandic horse.

The basis of Icelandic equitation lies in the long traditions of riding horse transport. On an island with little wood, making and using carriages or sleighs was not practical in Iceland. Thus horses had to be ridden for long distances, and the style of equitation formed to accommodate comfort and endurance. A large proportion of the population of Iceland rides; the seat is normally relaxed and long-legged. The ideal seat is straight and balanced, with light cues and a light rein. Verbal cues are often used as well as seat and leg commands. Overall, the style is meant to be comfortable due to the animal's smooth gait as well as pleasurable. There are slight differences in tack, but for the most part it is very similar to English tack.

The Icelandic horse is able to pace as well as perform a smooth ambling gait known as the tölt, and is able to perform these gaits at a variety of tempi ranging from a walk to the speed of gallop. There is much organization around the breed within the country. This leads to competitions pitting animals against one another for gait, as well as some racing. Winners of these competitions win not only prizes, but also breeding popularity.

As the Icelandic is a fairly small horse and many riders are adults, the ratio of the body weight of the rider to that of the horse may be considerably higher than in some other styles of riding.
