= Deporte de lazo =

Team sport roping calves in Panama

The Deporte de Lazo or Competencia de Lazo is an equestrian sport of Panama, where it is among the most popular sporting events and is unofficially considered the national sport. Teams of twelve riders compete to lasso a calf weighing about 136 kilograms (300 lb) in the shortest possible time. The national association is the Federación Nacional de Lazo, which was formed in 1976.
