= Western dressage =

Dressage riding in western tack

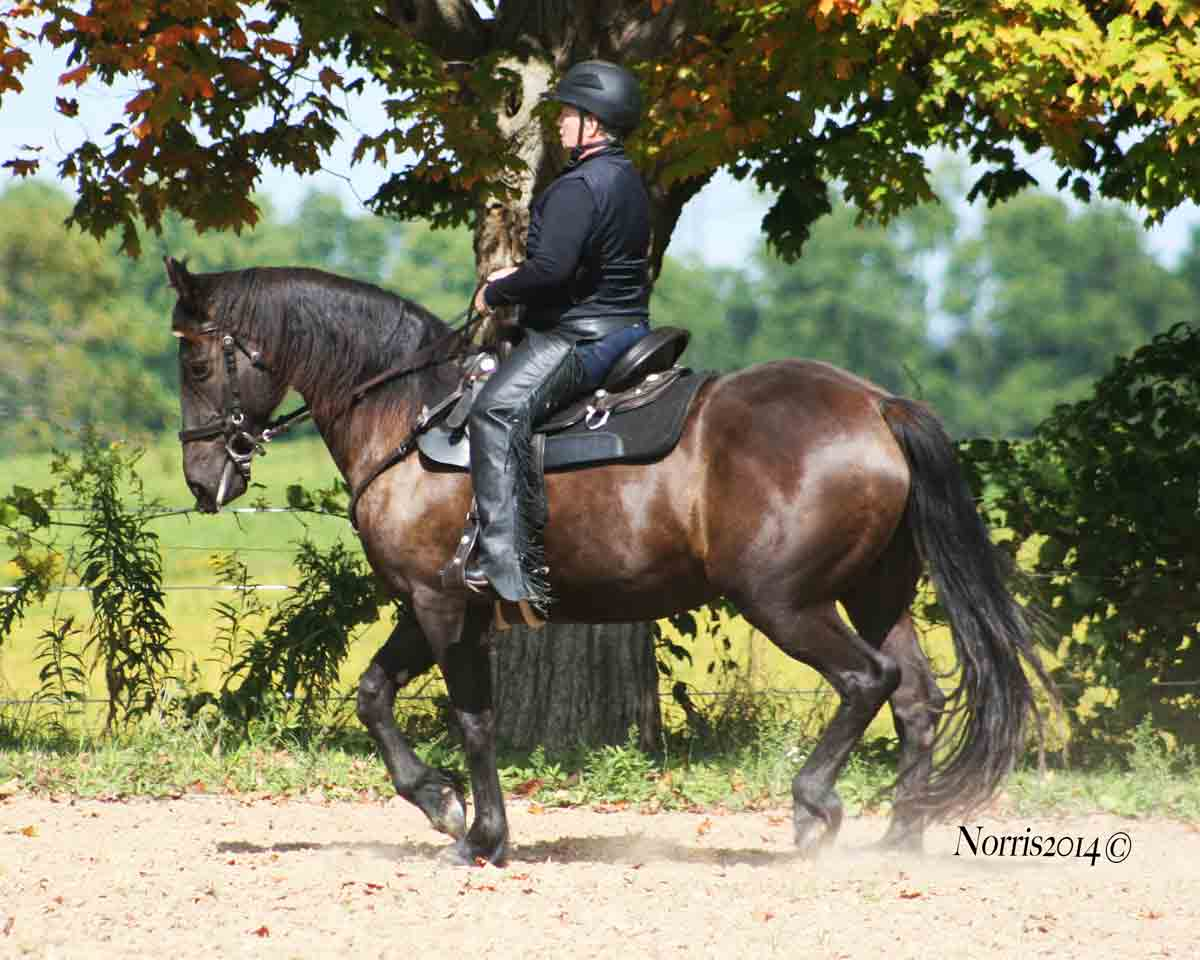
A horse and rider performing western dressage.

Western dressage is an equestrian sport that combines the principles of dressage riding and the use of western tack. Riders typically wear western attire, such as button-up shirts, cowboy boots and jeans. All horse breeds are permitted to compete in western dressage.

== Description ==
Western dressage consists of a basic test performed by horse and rider. At lower levels, competitors must perform a walk, trot or jog, and canter or lope. Higher level tests include lateral work and flying lead changes. Competitors are scored on how well they perform each movement within the test, by means of a score from 0 (not performed) to 10 (excellent).

Riders usually wear western shirts, jeans or show pants, and cowboy boots. Chaps are allowed but not always worn. Cowboy hats are traditionally worn, but some riders may choose to wear equestrian helmets. Horse tack typically consists of western saddles, western-style bridles, and saddle blankets. Either a curb or snaffle bit may be used.

Any breed of horse, pony, or mule is allowed to compete. Gaited horses may compete using their intermediate gait instead of the trot.

== Organizations ==
In the United States, the Western Dressage Association of America is the largest group devoted to western dressage and is affiliated with the United States Equestrian Federation. North American Western Dressage offers western dressage tests and specializes in virtual competitions which allow people to submit videos of themselves riding in order to compete from home or a local barn. The sport has associations in other countries in the Western Style Dressage Association of Canada, and the Western Dressage Association of Australia.
