= Menorquín horse =

Breed of horse from Menorca

Menorquín
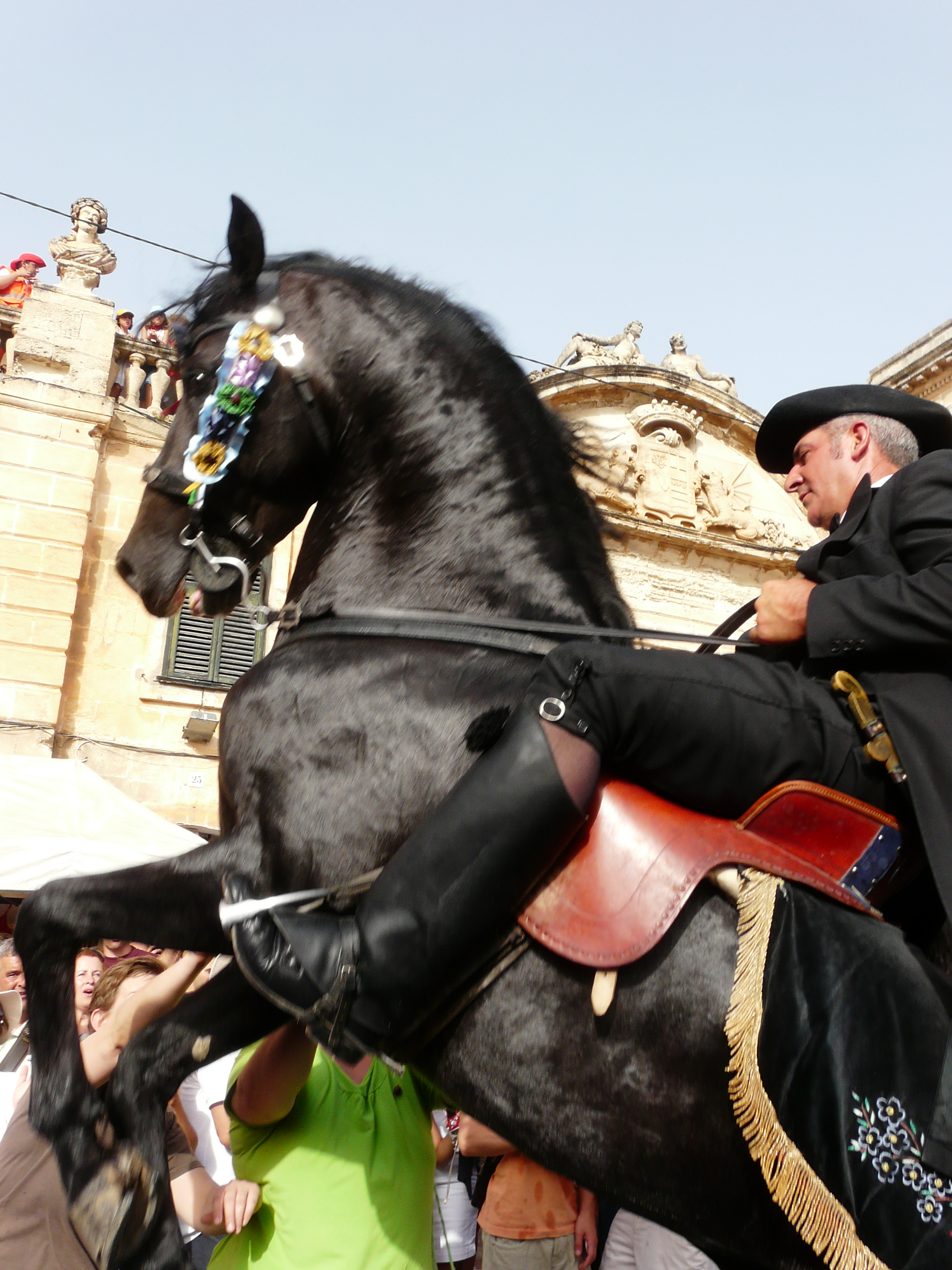
- Menorquín horse and rider
- Conservation status: FAO 2007: endangered
- Other names: Cavall Menorquí; Menorquina
- Country of origin: Spain
- Distribution: Menorca

Traits
- Height: average 1.60 m; Male: minimum 1.54 m; Female: minimum 1.51 m
- Colour: black

Breed standards
- Dirección General de Recursos Agrícolas y Ganaderos

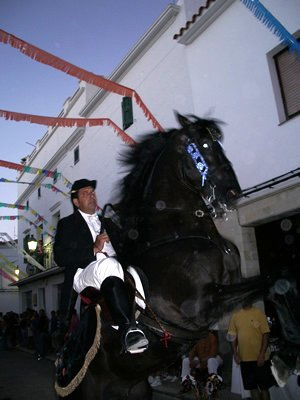
Menorquín horse and rider at Ciutadella

The Menorquín or Catalan: Cavall Menorquí is a breed of horse indigenous to the island of Menorca in the Balearic Islands, from which it takes its name. It is closely associated with the doma menorquina style of riding.

== History ==
Menorca was under Moorish domination from 903 to 1287. According some sources, research has shown links between the Menorquín and Arab breeds, while others have shown it to be of Berber origin, and yet others believe that it was brought to Menorca from central Europe by King James I of Aragon. According to the Government of the Balearic Islands, it belongs to the eastern group of indigenous Iberian horses which also included the now extinct Catalan horse.

The Menorquín was officially recognised as an indigenous breed in 1989, and is listed in the Catálogo Oficial de Razas de Ganado de España in the group of autochthonous breeds in danger of extinction. The FAO lists it as "endangered". In April 2011, the total population was reported to be 2995, of which fewer than 200 were outside the Balearic Islands. A breeders' association, the Associació de Criadors i Propietaris de Cavalls de Raça Menorquina, was formed in August 1988.

The breed has remained agile and slender as it was not employed for agricultural work, for which the Balearic donkey was traditionally used.

== Characteristics ==
The Menorquín may only be black, in all its variations; horses of any other colour cannot be registered. Limited white markings are permitted. It is harmoniously made, tranquil and obedient, noble and elegant. The average height is 1.60 metres (15.3 hands), and the minimum permissible height 1.54 m (15.1 h) for males and 1.51 m (14.3 h) for mares. The profile is slightly convex, the body and limbs long, the eye round and lively. It is strong and energetic, slender, powerful, and muscular and suited to any type of saddle or driving use. Its most valued quality is its suitability for the traditional festivals of Menorca, where it is irreplaceable, and for the elevade and bot movements of the doma menorquina.

== See also ==
- Mallorquín
