= Horacio Espondaburu =

Uruguayan painter

- Born: 31 October 1855; Minas, Uruguay
- Died: 27 September 1902 (aged 46); Montevideo, Uruguay
- Known for: Painting
- Notable work: Capataz de estancia, Tropa de ganado atravesando un arroyo, El enlazador, Jesus Asleep on the Cross
- Movement: costumbrista art

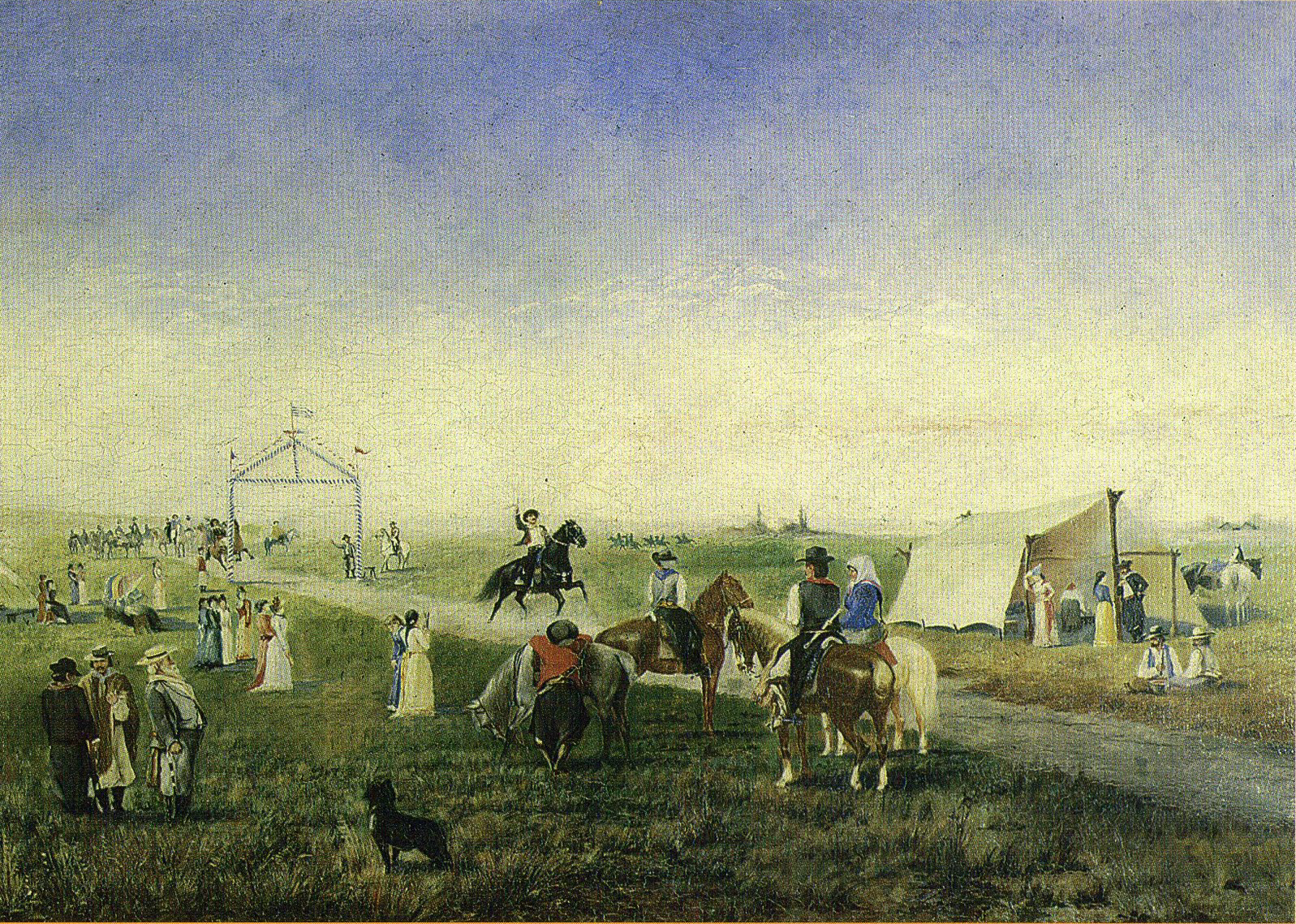
“Corrida de sortijas” (“Ring-Spearing Contest”) by Horacio Espondaburu

Horacio Espondaburu (born September 24, 1855, Minas, Uruguay – died September 27, 1902, Montevideo, Uruguay) was a Uruguayan painter who specialized in costumbrista art, focusing on rural scenes and gaucho culture.

== Early life and education ==
Espondaburu was born in Minas, Uruguay, and later moved to Montevideo with his family. He became a disciple of the Uruguayan artist Juan Manuel Blanes. In 1885, the Uruguayan government awarded him a five-year scholarship to study painting in Europe.

Espondaburu studied primarily at the Academy of Fine Arts in Madrid, Spain, while also spending a short time at art schools in Paris. During this period, he produced both original works and reproductions, such as a copy of Murillo's Jesus Asleep on the Cross, based on the original in the Prado Museum.

== Career in Uruguay ==
Upon his return to Montevideo, Espondaburu balanced his work as a painter with teaching. He taught drawing at the Internado de Señoritas and in his private studio. In 1898, he returned to Minas, where he created numerous portraits and paintings by commission. In 1899, Espondaburu's daughter Áurea was born but passed away three months later. His health began to decline due to tuberculosis, exacerbated by his bohemian lifestyle. Espondaburu died in Montevideo in 1902.

== Artistic work ==
Espondaburu was a prominent landscape and costumbrista painter, alongside artists like Carlos María Herrera. His works often depicted the life of gauchos, showcasing aspects of their everyday activities. Notable works include the watercolor Capataz de estancia, the oil painting Tropa de ganado atravesando un arroyo, and El enlazador, which was published in El Indiscreto in 1884.

== Legacy ==
Espondaburu's contributions to Uruguayan art are primarily seen in his depictions of rural life and gaucho culture, making him a significant figure in the country's costumbrista movement. His attention to detail and dedication to the representation of Uruguayan customs and landscapes marked him as one of the important artists of his time. His work is recognized as part of Uruguay's cultural heritage, and he has been featured in critical art dictionaries and cultural histories focused on Uruguayan artists. Espondaburu's paintings reflect the visual and cultural landscape of Uruguay in the late 19th century.
