= Corrida de sortija =

Equestrian sport derived from jousting

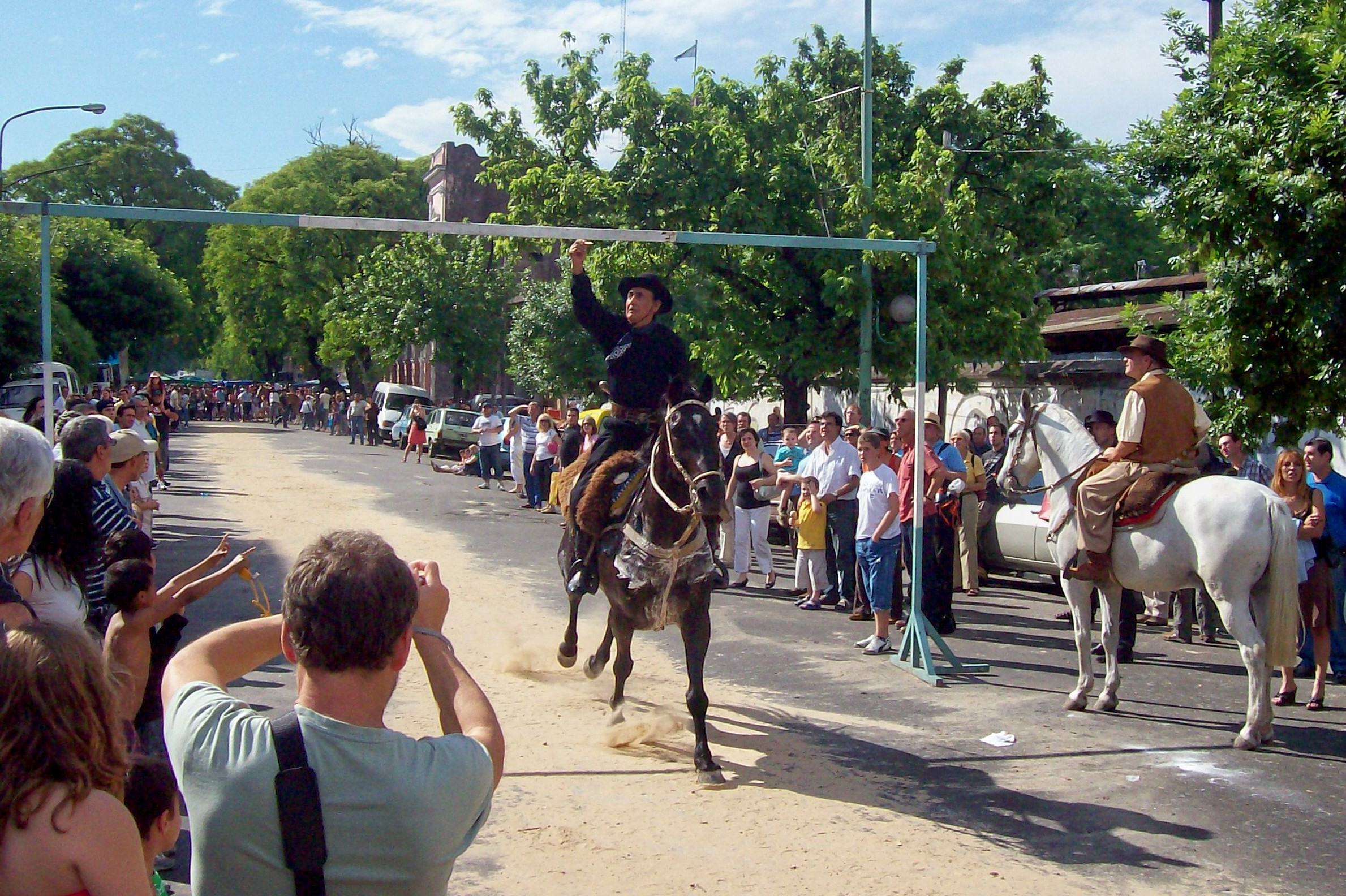
Corrida de la Sortija at the Feria de Mataderos in Buenos Aires

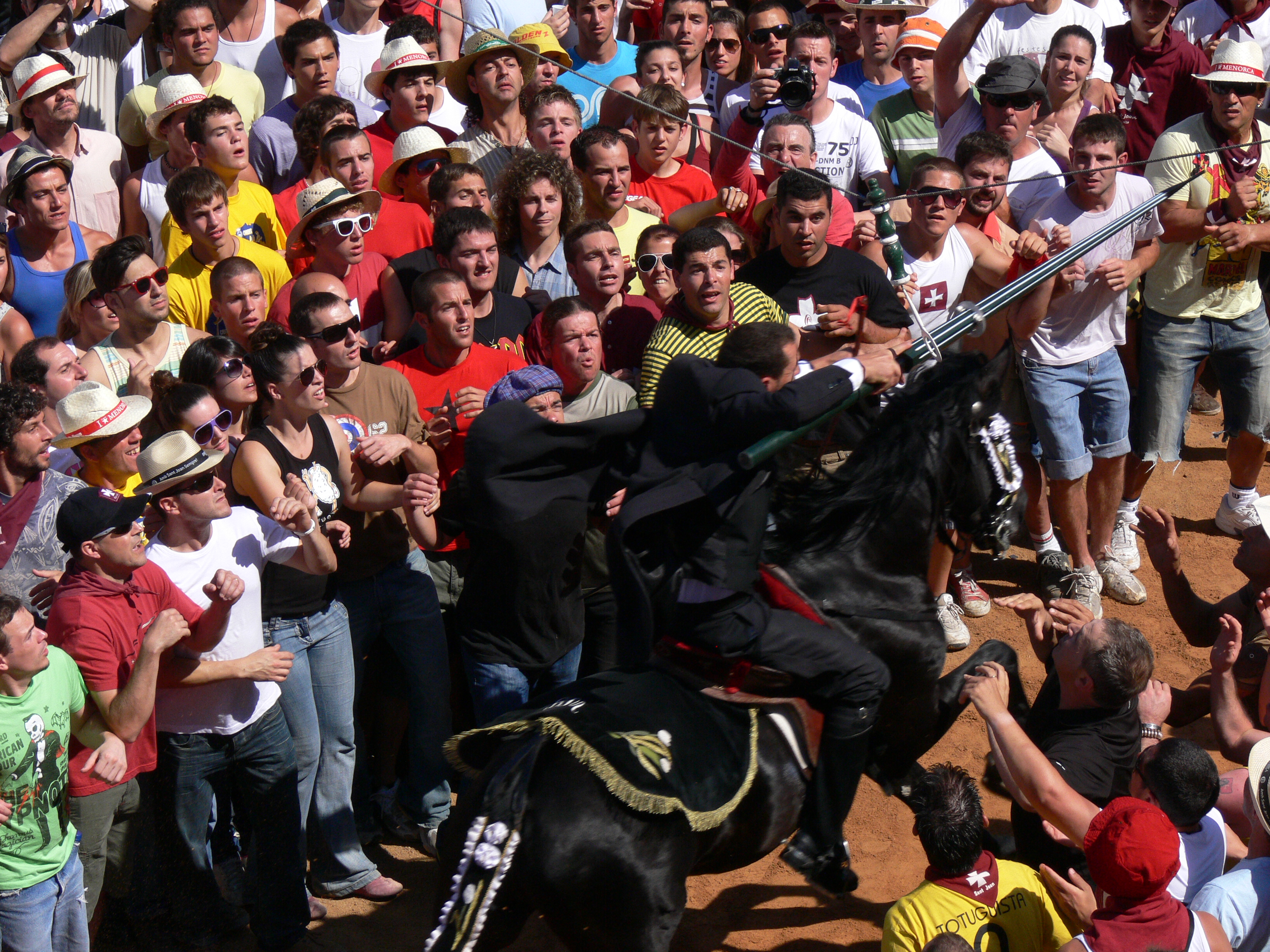
Festival of Sant Joan. Ciutadella de Menorca

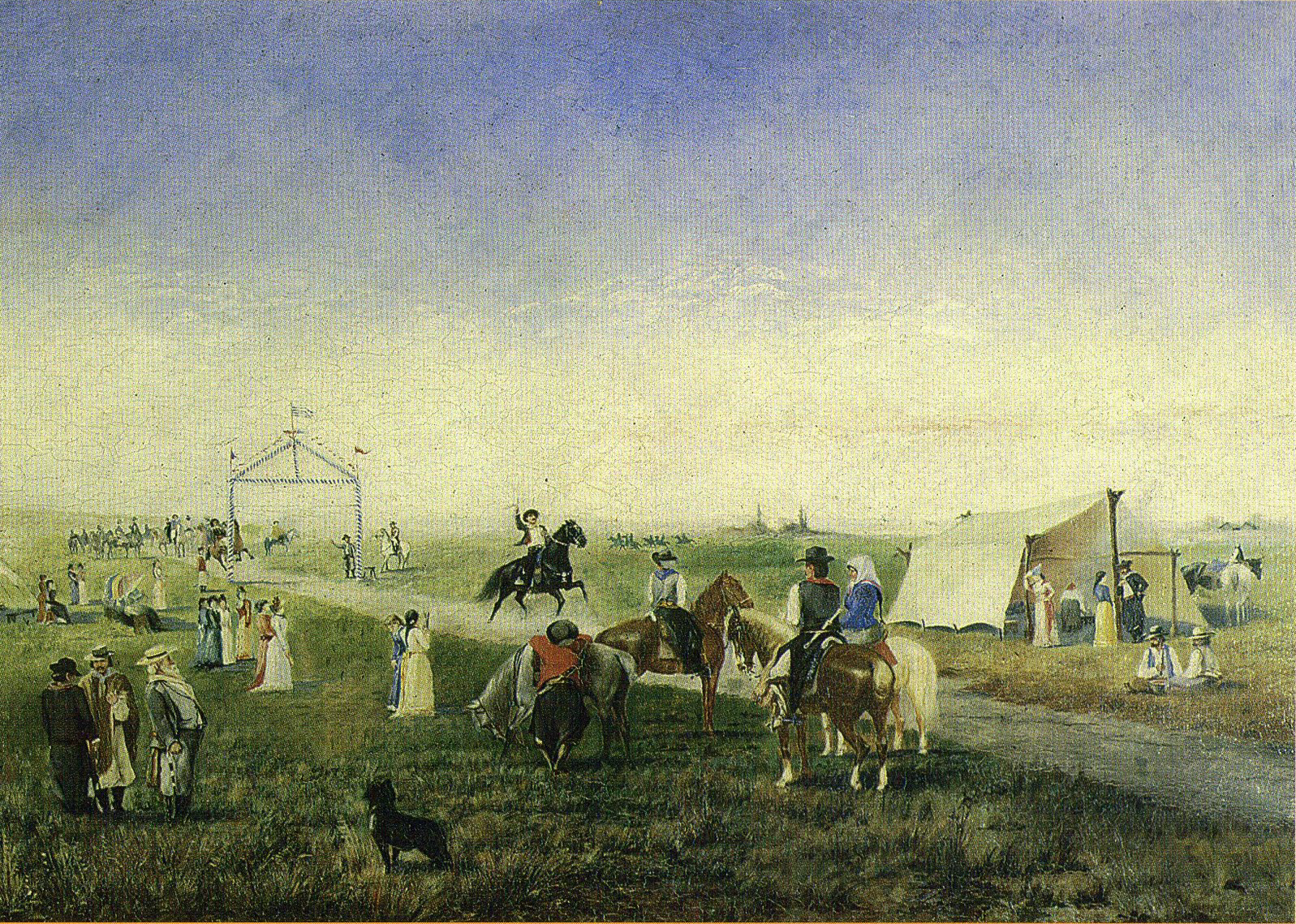
Corrida de sortijas, oil on canvas by the Uruguayan painter Horacio Espondaburu (1855-1902), now in the Museo Histórico Nacional of Montevideo

The corrida de sortija is a traditional gaucho sport of the Rio de la Plata area of South America that is similar to ring jousting.

In Spain, it forms part of the annual Festival of Sant Joan in Ciutadella de Menorca in the Balearic Islands, where it is known as córrer s'ensortilla.

It was described by Thomas Hutchinson in 1868:

"La Sortija" (the ring) is now-a-days the most frequent Gaucho sport, to be seen in Carnival and other festal times. It is played as follows. In the principal Plaza of the chief towns, and at about 5 pm, you will see placed in the centre of the main street, or principal Plaza, two upright wooden posts about ten feet high, crossed by a beam ... In the middle of this cross-beam, and underneath[,] is loosely suspended a small ring, not larger than a wedding-ring. A Gaucho, galloping at the fastest beneath this, is to bear off the ring on a bit of twig, about the calibre of an ordinary pencil, or the handle of a steel pen. Numberless are the failures, for knocking off, without retaining it on the stick, is not sufficient. But many, of course, are the successes, each of which is greeted by a "Viva!" "Viva!"

— Thomas Hutchinson, The Paraná: with incidents of the Paraguayan war, and South American recollections, from 1861-1868 E. Stanford 1868
