= Spanish walk =

Artificial gait of a horse

Animated sequence of the Spanish walk

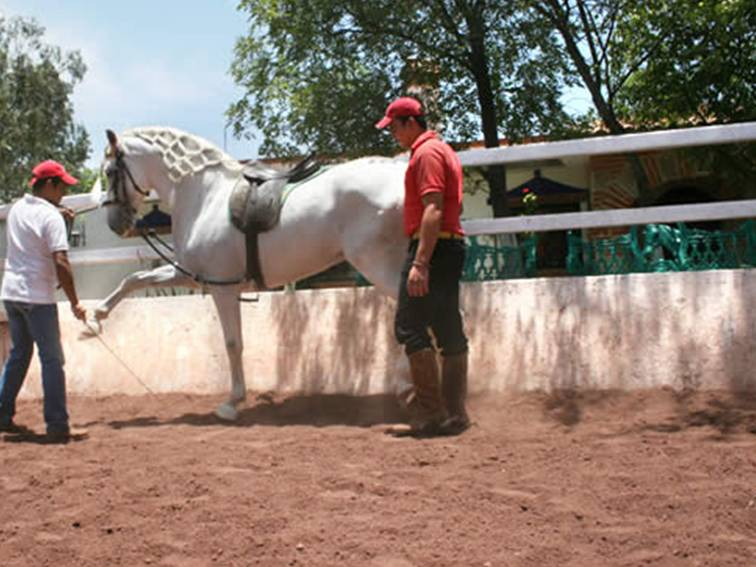
Horse being cued from the ground to perform the Spanish walk

The Spanish walk is a trained movement performed by a horse. While at a walk, as the horse raises each foreleg off the ground, it lifts the leg in an exaggerated upward and forward manner. While the Spanish walk is loosely affiliated with the field of dressage, it is more of a trick or circus movement and not included in any modern dressage tests. It is often taught to horses of the Andalusian and Lusitano breeds and is considered a part of the horse culture in Spain. The action is said to benefit the horse by helping it learn to open up its shoulder movement.
