= Doma vaquera =

Traditional horse riding discipline of Spain

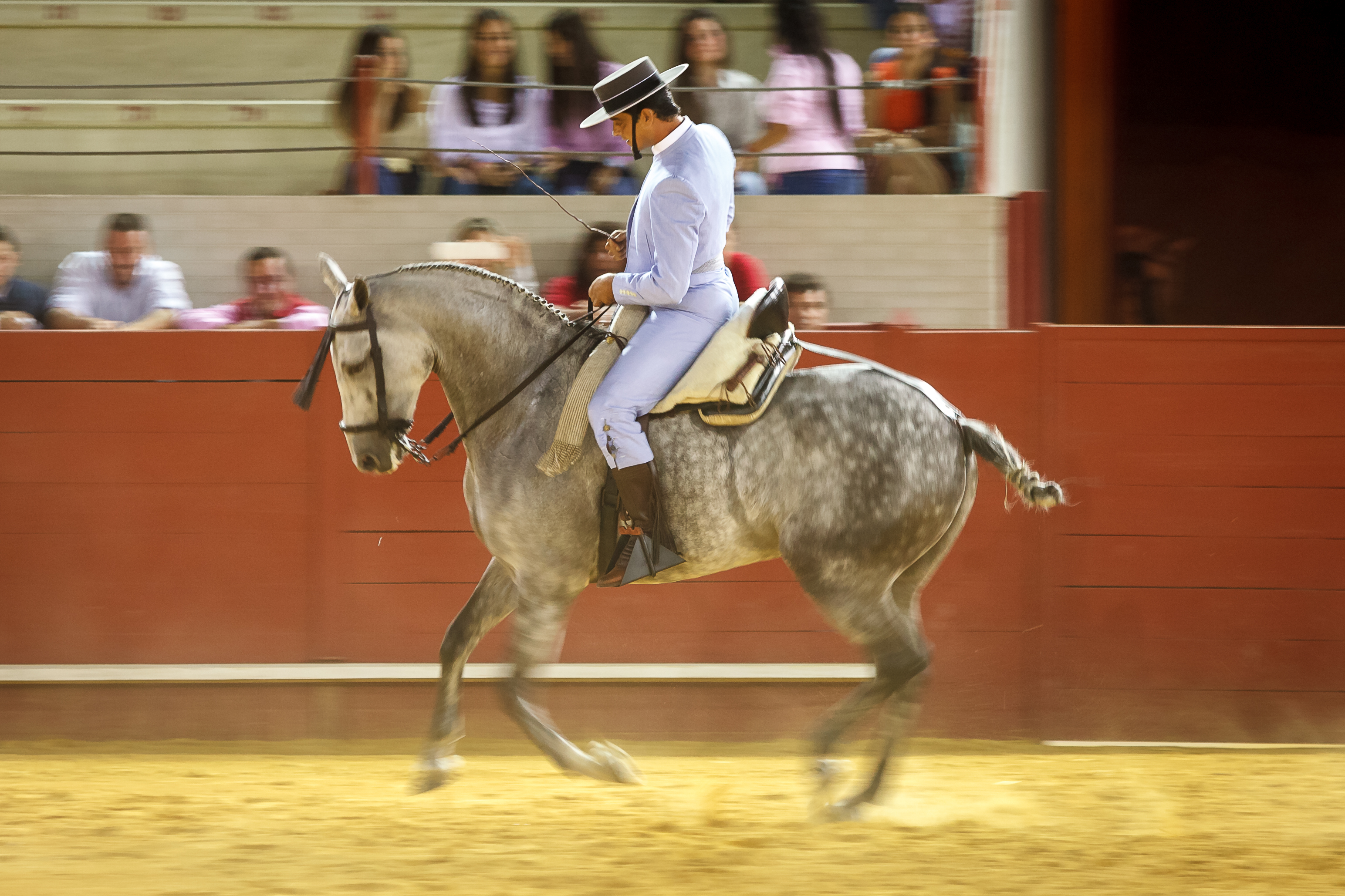
Doma vaquera

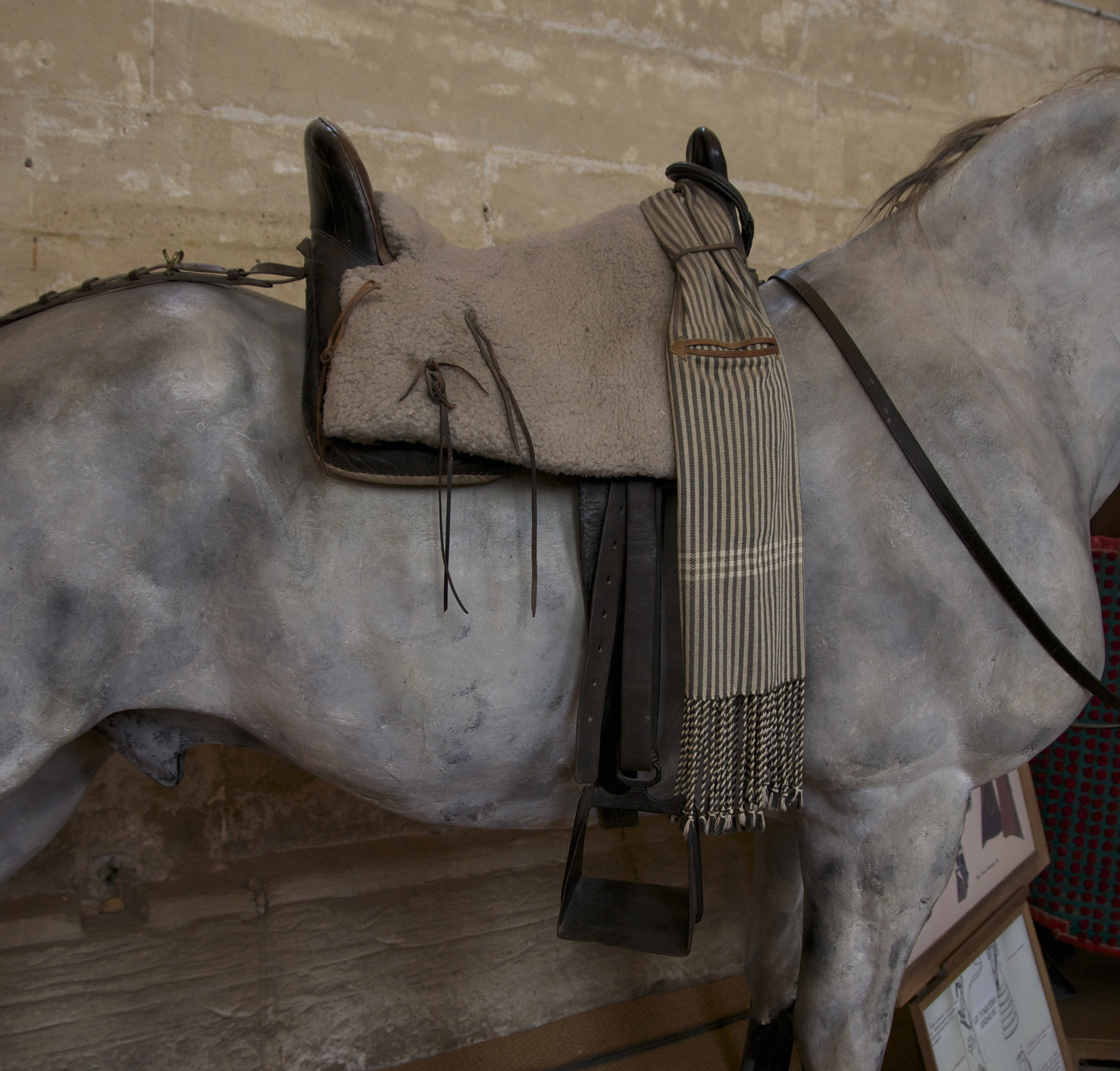
Spanish vaquero saddle

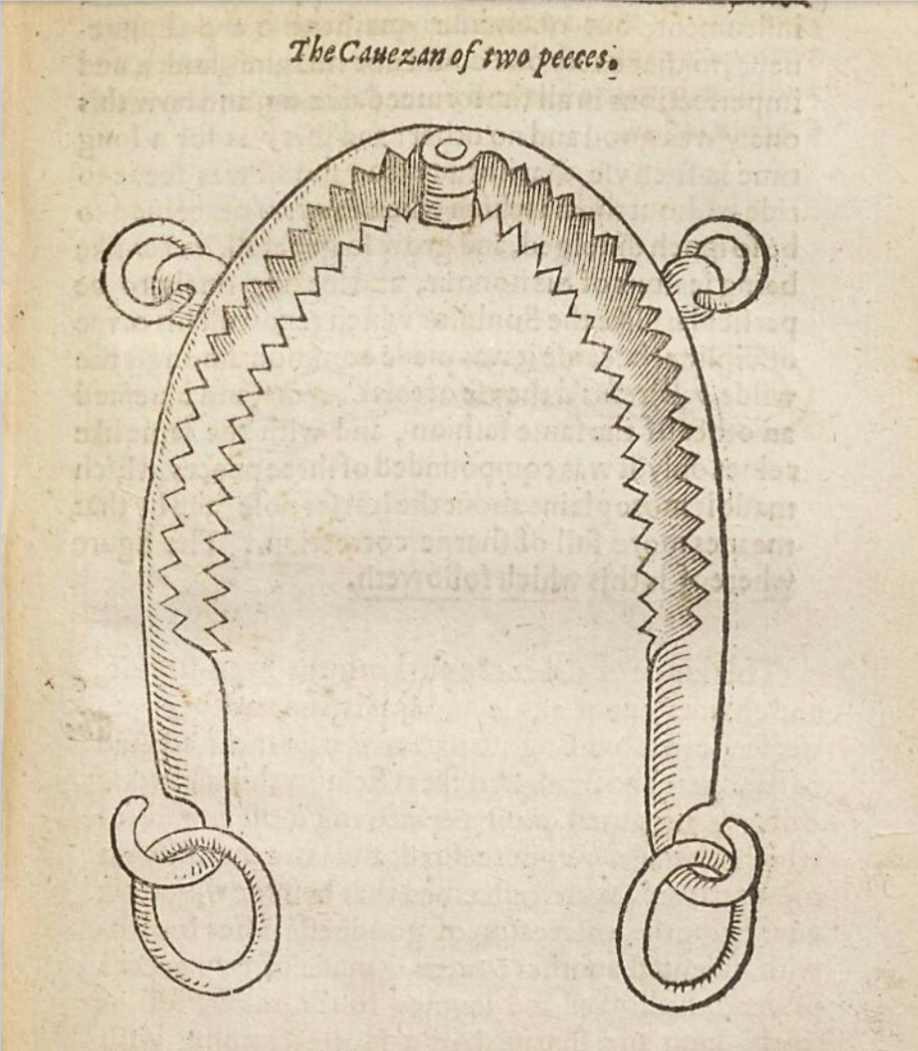
Serreta or serrated cavesson used in Doma Vaquera for training horses

The Doma vaquera (Spanish pronunciation: [ˈdoma βaˈkeɾa]) is the traditional working riding discipline of Spain created in the 1970s. It is based upon two distinct riding styles: "a la Brida", an ancient riding school in which the rider rode in long stirrups, with his legs straight, on a saddle with high pommel and cantle; it was the typical riding technique of heavy cavalry. And "a la Jineta", an Arab or African riding method in which the rider rode with shorter stirrups, with his legs bent, allowing the rider a more direct and precise contact of the "lower aids" with the horse's sides, sitting firmly in the center of the saddle, keeping the feet firmly resting on the stirrups; it was the typical riding method of light cavalry.

Beside these distinctions, the other main difference between these two riding schools were their teaching or breaking methods, as Brida horsemanship teaches and trains the horse with severity and violence, using the serrated cavesson or serreta and other punishments like the martingale; while Jineta only relied on the use of the bit and a lot of pulse, care and consideration of the hand on the reins to teach the horse. Spanish doma vaquera, like its predecessor "La Brida", relies heavily upon this harsh method by using the serrated cavesson or "serreta" to train horses. The use of the serreta gave rise to an old Spanish tradition that believed that on a horse "a bloody nose made a good mouth", indicating that using a serreta made a good obedient horse. Many horses trained in Doma vaquera have scars on their noses as a result of the serreta.

Along with rejoneo and acoso y derribo, it is distinct from the classical Spanish haute école or doma clásica.
