= Oldenburger =

Horse breed

Oldenburg
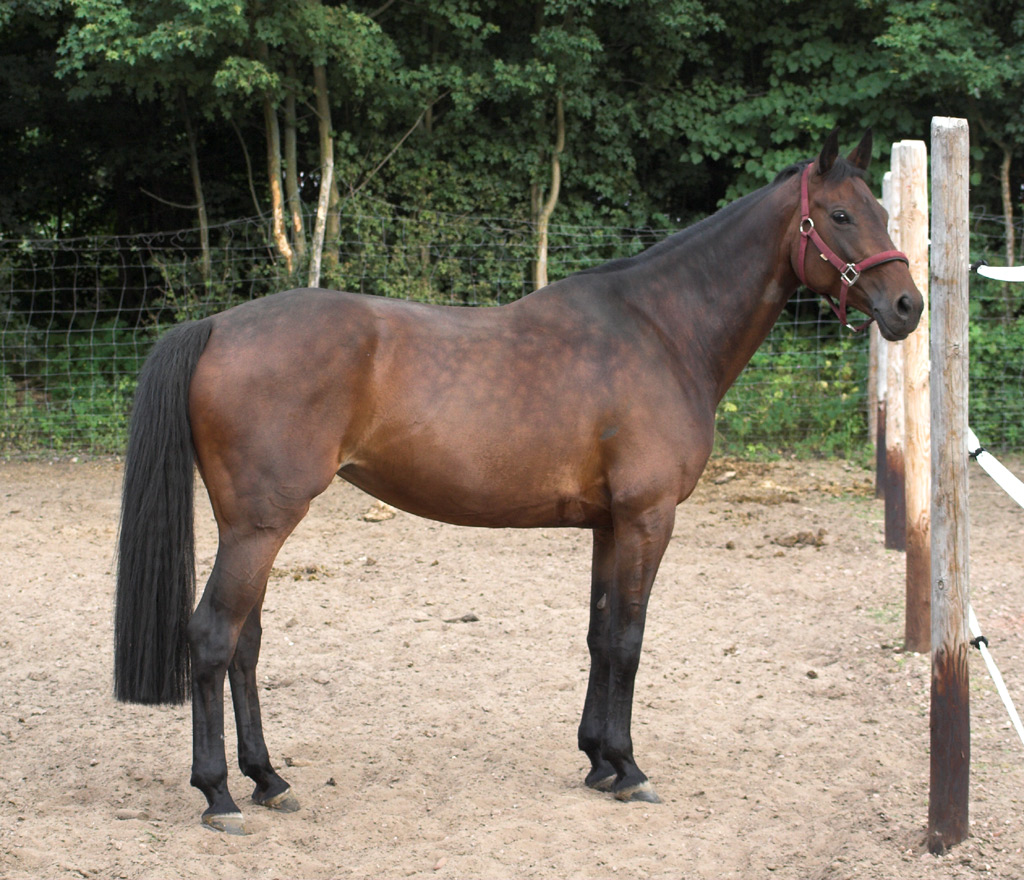
- Oldenburg mare
- Other names: Oldenburger
- Country of origin: Germany

Traits
- Distinguishing features: Modern sport horse type suitable for dressage and jumping.

Breed standards
- Verband der Zuechter des Oldenburger Pferdes e.V.; Oldenburg Horse Breeders' Society (GOV NA)

The Oldenburg or Oldenburger is a warmblood horse from the north-western corner of Lower Saxony, what was formerly the Grand Duchy of Oldenburg. The breed was built on a mare base of all-purpose farm and carriage horses, today called the Alt-Oldenburger. The modern Oldenburg is managed by the Association of Breeders of the Oldenburger Horse, which enacts strict selection of breeding stock to ensure that each generation is better than the last. Oldenburgers are tall sport horses with excellent gaits and jumping ability. The breeding of Oldenburg horses is characterized by very liberal pedigree requirements and the exclusive use of privately owned stallions rather than restriction to a state-owned stud farm.

== History ==
Until the 17th century, horses in the region of Oldenburg were likely small and plain, but strong enough to be used to work the heavy soil of the Frisian coast. These horses would become the foundation of the Oldenburg's neighbors from Holstein to Groningen. One of the first to take a vested interest in organized horse breeding was Count Johann XVI (1540–1603). Johann XVI purchased high-class Frederiksborgers from Denmark, refined Turkish horses and powerful Neapolitan and Andalusian horses for use with his own breeding stock. His successor, Count Anton Gunther (1583–1667) not only brought back from his travels the most desirable horses of the time, but made the stallions available to his tenants.

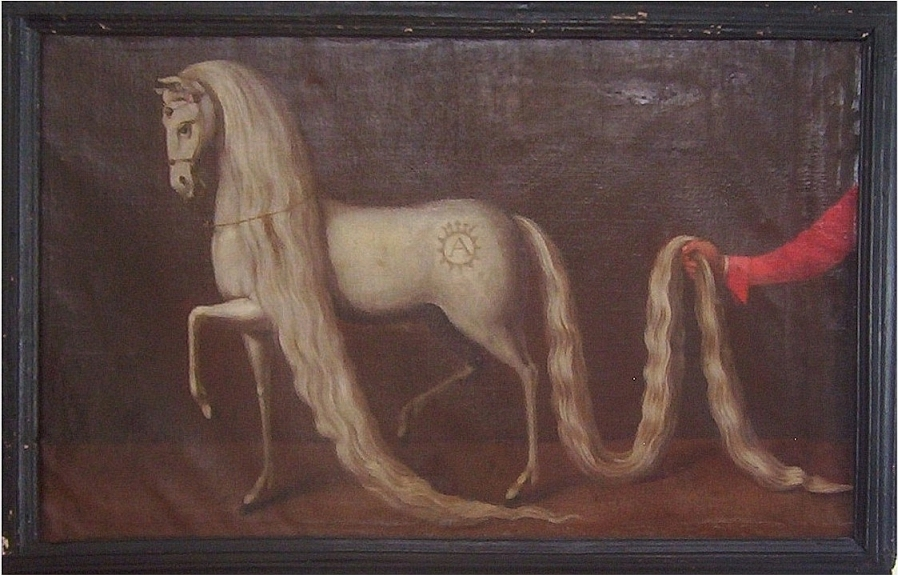
The Oldenburg stallion Kranich was bred by Anton Günther in around 1640. His Spanish-influenced type was the style of the time.

Rigorous stallion inspections were held beginning in 1715 in Ostfrisia, and spread to Oldenburg in 1755. Such inspections became mandatory under state regulation in 1820. These processes enabled breeders to mold the horses quickly to suit the market. In time, the Oldenburg and its neighbor the Ostfriesen became "luxury horses", stylish, high-stepping carriage horses, though they were practical farm horses as well. What set the Oldenburg and Ostfriesen apart was the lack of a state-owned stud farm. As private breeders, mare and stallion owners had and retain greater freedom in purchasing breeding stock, and as a result Oldenburg and Ostfriesen horses were exported far and wide. In 1923, the Ostfriesen studbook and Oldenburg studbook merged to form today's Oldenburg Horse Breeders' Association (GOV).

=== Post-war era ===
All the roles that the Alt-Oldenburger played – carriage horse, artillery horse, farm horse – were overtaken in succession by mechanization during the 1940s and 1950s. However, increased leisure time and expendable income set the stage for recreational riding to come into its own, which it did. Oldenburg breeders changed direction, moving towards producing riding horses of the same renown as their carriage horses.

The first foreign stallion imported to improve the riding horse qualities of the Oldenburg mares was Condor, a dark bay Anglo-Norman. He was followed by Adonis xx in 1959, this time a full Thoroughbred. A veritable slew of Thoroughbred sires were approved for Oldenburg mares over the next 15 years: Manolete xx, Miracolo xx, Guter Gast xx, More Magic xx, Makuba xx, and not least of all, Vollkorn xx. Vollkorn xx produced one of Oldenburg's first international sport horses: Volturno, out of a Manolette xx daughter, was a member of the Olympic silver medal-winning Eventing team in 1976.

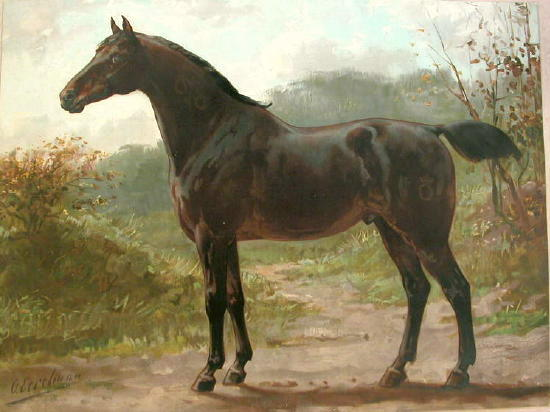
1898 lithograph of a carriage-type Oldenburg showing both hip and neck brands.

Condor's success encouraged the Oldenburg breeders to choose French sires over German ones. Prominent among these were Furioso II in 1968 and Futuro in 1969, both by Furioso xx, Tiro, and Zeus, who was by French Anglo-Arabian Arlequin x. There was also the Trakehner, Magister, though Trakehners were not used in Oldenburg to the same extent that they were in neighboring Hannover. In 1972 added flair came to the Oldenburg from the French Anglo-Arabian stallion, Inschallah x, who donated his expressive gaits and dry features to his offspring.

And technology continued to change the Oldenburg. Advances in artificial insemination techniques meant that stallions did not have to be nearby to be part of the breeding population. Since the 1970s, use of horses from all over Europe has greatly increased. German Warmbloods like the Hanoverian, Holsteiner, Westphalian, and Trakehner, in addition to Dutch Warmbloods and Selle Français continued to modernize the Oldenburg.

The slogan of the German Oldenburg Verband is that "Quality is the only standard that counts," evidenced by their liberal acceptance of a wide variety of pedigrees and colors. Unlike other registries that are limited to locally bred horses, or which prefer one color to another, the modern Oldenburg selects stallions and mares based only on their quality as dressage and jumping horses.

=== Modern Oldenburg ===
Today the Oldenburg Association or Verband has over 220 approved sires and 7000 mares in addition to the 96 sires and 1300 mares that are part of the "Oldenburg International" breeding program for show jumping. These figures make Oldenburg one of the largest studbooks in Germany. Oldenburg is the largest studbook in terms of breeding area.

Each autumn, the Oldenburg Verband holds the "Stallion Days" in Vechta, during which the young stallions undergo their licensing evaluation. After the results of the licensing are announced, many are auctioned off to new homes at stallion stations, or as gelding prospects bound for performance homes. The "Old Stallion Parade" occurs on the last day, showcasing all the fully approved, performance tested stallions. However, this event is not just a pageant, as the offspring of mature stallions are subject to intense scrutiny. The best stallions of their age class, based on their offspring, receive a "premium" or award for their achievements in breeding.

There are several other auctions throughout the year in Vechta featuring selected youngsters, köraspirants, elite riding horses and broodmares. The price-toppers at the elite sales regularly fetch over 100,000 Euros. At the mixed sales there are a wider range of horses available. The verband also puts on free jumping competitions for young horses.

The Oldenburg Verband places special emphasis on mare lines, many of which trace back to the Alt-Oldenburg ancestors. Selected from the mare inspections throughout the year, the best young mares are invited to the Elite Broodmare Show in Rastede. There they compete not only for the States Premium - originally a bribe to keep breeders from exporting high-quality broodmares - but for the title of Champion Mare.

== Characteristics ==
The modern Oldenburg can best be identified by the "O" and crown brand on the left hip. Horses of the "Oldenburg International" program have a similar brand, with an "S" within a crowned, incomplete "O". Underneath the Oldenburg brand are the last two numbers of the horse's life number. The official brand can only be placed on Oldenburg horses prior to 2 years of age. A digital micro-chip implanted in the crest of the neck is another identification method used.

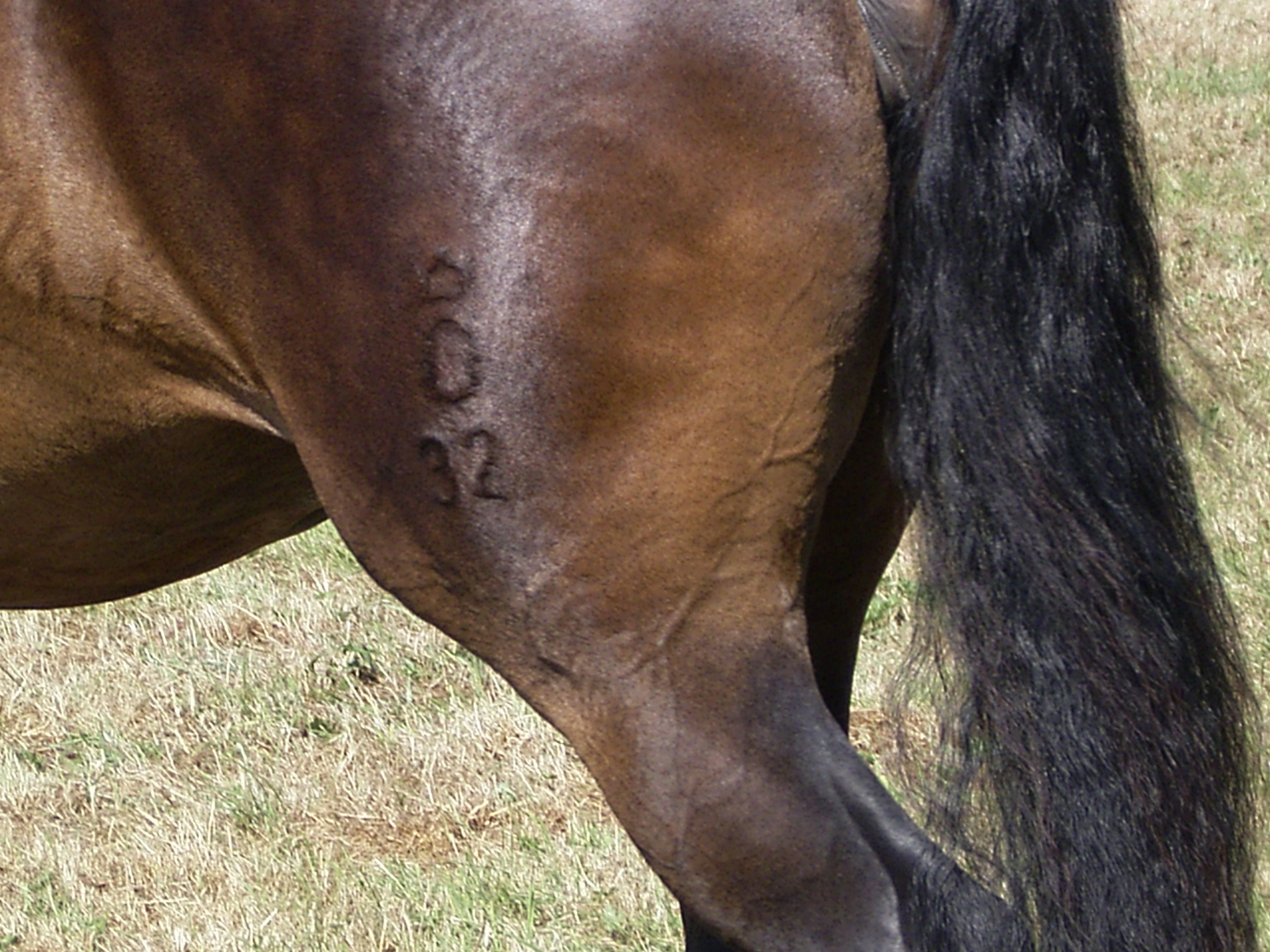
Oldenburg brand showing the "O"-and-crown and last 2 digits of the life number

The appearance of an individual Oldenburg can vary, and it is usually better to describe any warmblood by its actual parentage. However, Oldenburg is known for producing among the most "modern" examples of riding horses: expressive heads and long legs. Otherwise, they are selected to fit the model of a sport horse, generally built uphill with a reasonably long neck and a long, moderately sloped pelvis. Ideally, they stand between 16 and 17.2 hands (64 and 70 inches, 163 and 178 cm).

Oldenburg has, as part of its liberality, been very forward-thinking about unusually colored warmbloods. Between the United States and Germany, no fewer than 8 tobiano pinto stallions are included in the roster. Most Oldenburgers are black, brown, bay, chestnut, or grey.

Even among warmbloods, most Oldenburgers have expressive, elastic gaits with a great deal of suspension. The quality of the walk, trot, or canter is highly individual, but their gaits are selected to be suitable for sport. All three gaits are straight when viewed from the front or back, and rhythmical at all times. The walk is diligent and open, the trot is active and elastic, and the canter is uphill and adjustable. Over fences, even most dressage-bred Oldenburgers show some talent. The jumper-bred individuals are capable with great technique.

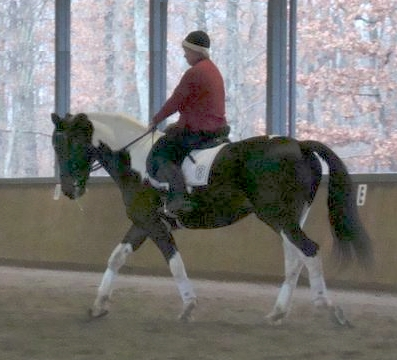
Certain bloodlines within the Oldenburg population may, as this horse, exhibit a tobiano pattern.

Several breeding societies have lately come under scrutiny for breeding their horses too "hot". This movement has come about as show jumping has exploded in popularity: sensitive, independent horses, in general, make better show jumpers. However, highly sensitive, independent horses are not suitable for most amateur riders, who make up the majority of the horse-buying market. This is when the importance of the performance test is clearest. The stallions and elite mares are scored on their interior qualities: temperament, character, constitution, and willingness to work, as well as rideability. Therefore, within the Oldenburg Verband, breeders have the tools to choose the route of high-performance horse, or one more suitable for the amateur rider. While a variety of temperaments exist within the population, finding one with the right elements is not difficult.

According to the verband rules, colts are to be named patrilineally, that is, the first letter of the son's name is the same as the first letter of the sire's name (Dream of Glory by Donnerhall). Fillies are named matrilineally (Fabina out of Fiesta). This practice makes it easy to trace female families.

== Uses ==
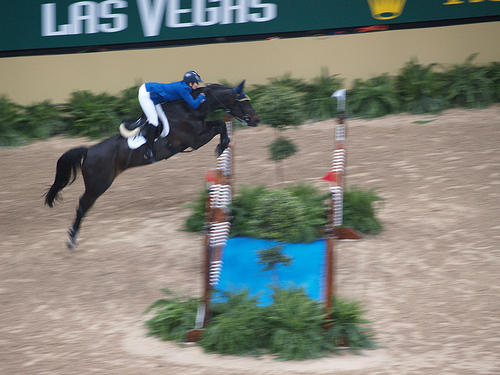
An Oldenburg competing at the 2007 World Cup in show jumping

Unless directly sired by a Thoroughbred, most Oldenburgers are too slow for eventing. All the same, in 2006 the Oldenburg Verband was #11 in the World Breeding Federation for Sport Horses (WBFSH) ranking of studbooks with the greatest prevalence in international eventing. One of the earliest Oldenburg horses to reach the highest echelons of sport was Volturno, a black stallion born in 1968, member of the 1976 silver-medal German Olympic eventing team.

Especially with the implementation of the Oldenburg Jumper Studbook in 2001, Oldenburgers have been very successful in the sport of show jumping. Bred to be courageous, cautious, powerful, scopey, and correct over fences, the Oldenburg Verband was #7 in the WBFSH ranking of studbooks in show jumping. Thanks to the likes of 2006 World Cup champion Sandro Boy and Arko III, only the Westphalian, Hanoverian, Dutch Warmblood and jumping-focused Holsteiner, Selle Français, and Belgian Warmblood had stronger showings in international sport.

The Oldenburg has become particularly successful in dressage, owing much of its continued success to sires like Donnerhall and now Sandro Hit, who top the rankings in the production of dressage horses. In 2006, Oldenburgers were the third most successful breed in the dressage ring, with only the Hanoverian and Dutch Warmblood breeds having higher WBFSH standings. Oldenburg horses have competed in Dressage at the Olympics.
