= Big Ben (horse, foaled 1976) =

Belgian show jumper

- Breed: Belgian Warmblood
- Sire: Etretat
- Grandsire: Vagabond
- Dam: Oekie
- Maternal grandsire: Flevo
- Sex: Gelding
- Foaled: April 20, 1976; Kalmthout, Belgium
- Died: December 11, 1999 (aged 23); Perth, Ontario, Canada
- Country: Canada
- Colour: Liver Chestnut with a blaze and socks on both hind legs
- Breeder: Jacobus van Hooydonk
- Owner: Ian Millar

Earnings
- $1.5 million +

Big Ben (April 20, 1976 – December 11, 1999) was a world champion show jumping horse and famous Belgian Warmblood.

== Birth and acquisition by Ian Millar ==
First named "Winston", Big Ben was born at the van Hooydonk Farm in Kalmthout (northern Belgium). Although his dam was only 15 hands (60 inches, 152 cm), Big Ben grew to be a very large horse standing 17.3 hands (71 inches, 180 cm) high. Soon after, he was purchased for Canadian equestrian Ian Millar for $45,000 and permanently relocated to Millar Brooke Farm in Perth, Ontario, Canada. Several lucrative offers were made to buy Big Ben throughout his career, but the ownership group, as well as Ian Millar, had such a strong bond with him that they refused all offers.

== Career ==
In 1984, the horse began competing in show jumping events, touching off what would become a long and successful career. Millar rode Big Ben to more than 40 Grand Prix titles including six Spruce Meadows Derbys, as well as taking the world cup show jumping championship two years in a row - the first World Cup Final coming at Gothenburg, Sweden in 1988, and then again the next year in Tampa, Florida. In 1989 he won the Grand Prix of Bordeaux, France and the Grand Prix of Stuttgart, Germany, ranking Millar number one in the world. Millar and Big Ben also won the du Maurier International twice, in 1987 and 1991, the world's richest grand prix event at that time.

In 1992 Big Ben survived two bouts with colic and an accident in which his horse trailer overturned on a highway after a head-on collision with a car. Two other horses died, and a third became unrideable due to its injuries. A fourth would never enter a trailer again. Big Ben won a Grand Prix only 2 months later. After much talk about his mounting injuries, he would go on to win his sixth Spruce Meadows Derby in front of 50,000 spectators. This was his final derby appearance.

== Retirement and death ==
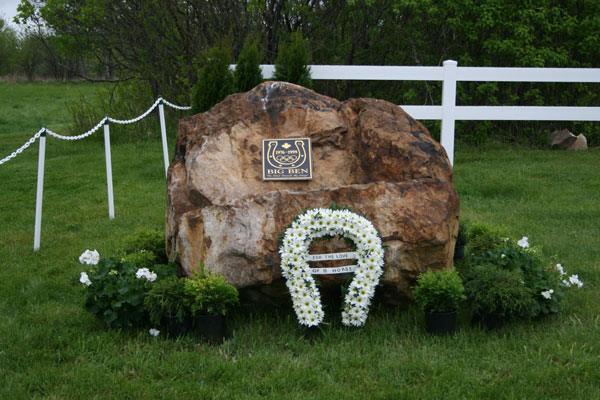
Big Ben's grave site at Millar Brooke Farm

After 11 years of competition, Big Ben was retired to Millar Brooke Farm in 1994. On December 11, 1999, two veterinarians informed Millar that Big Ben was suffering from a third, untreatable case of colic. He was euthanized at Millar Brooke Farm at 23 years of age. He was buried on a knoll overlooking the farm.

== Honours and memorials ==
In 1999, Big Ben was recognised as a Canadian icon when Canada Post honoured him with his own stamp. Big Ben was inducted into the Ontario Sports Hall of Fame and the Canadian Sports Hall of Fame. His story is told in the book titled "Big Ben", by author Lawrence Scanlan.

In 2000, Big Ben's personal groom, Sandra Patterson, wrote a tribute to Big Ben in the book titled "An Apple a Day: A Heartwarming Collection of True Horse Stories" edited by Kimberly Gatto. In 2005, the Perth and District Chamber of Commerce erected a bronze statue of Big Ben, with Ian Millar riding, in a park on the banks of the Tay River in downtown Perth, Ontario. Big Ben's image lives on as a Breyer model horse.

In 2011, a book titled "Unbridled Passion: Show Jumping's Greatest Horses and Riders", written by Jeff Papows, featured Big Ben and his owner and rider, Ian Millar. The book documented the challenges, such as the two bouts of life-threatening colic surgery, that Big Ben faced inside and outside the competitive ring. It features original research and interviews with Ian Miller and Big Ben's personal groom, Sandi Patterson.

== Achievements ==
- Won over $1.5 million in prize money
- First horse to win 2 consecutive World Cup Final titles 1988 Gothenburg and 1989 Tampa, Florida
- Team and Individual Gold medals at the 1987 Pan Am Games, Indianapolis
- Member of the 4th place Team at the 1984 Olympics in Los Angeles
- 2nd World Cup Finals in 1986 Gothenburg
- 5th World Cup Finals in 1987 Paris
- Member of the 4th place Team at the Show Jumping World Championships, Aachen
- Winner of Masters Grand Prix at Spruce Meadows in 1987 and 1991
- Member of the 4th place Team at the 1988 Olympics in Seoul
- Winner of Grand Prix of Stuttgart 1989
- Winner of Grand Prix of Bordeaux 1989
- Canadian National Show Jumping Champion 1988, 1991 and 1993
- Won the Spruce Meadows Derby 6 times in eight years (the Chrysler Classic in '86,'87 and '89 and the Shell Cup in '91,'92 and '93)
- One of only two horses inducted into the Canadian Sports Hall of Fame.

== Pedigree ==
Big Ben's sire was Etretat, a 16.2 hands (66 inches, 168 cm) or 16.3 hands (67 inches, 170 cm) French chestnut stallion who was 3/4 Thoroughbred, and 1/4 Selle Français, registered as a Selle Français. His dam, Oekie, was a 15 hands (60 inches, 152 cm) chestnut mare who was 3/4 Gelderlander and 1/4 Selle Français, registered as a Belgian Warmblood. Similar Selle Français, Gelderlander, and Thoroughbred crosses were used to create the closely related Dutch Warmblood horse breed.

Big Ben was descended in the male line from Precipitation (1933 – 1957), an influential British-bred Thoroughbred stallion who is found in the pedigrees of many racehorses and sport horses today. Precipitation was responsible for helping maintain the Matchem (1748 – 1781) and Godolphin Arabian sireline. Big Ben's dam, Oekie, was descended in the male line from Furioso (1939 – 1968), an influential Thoroughbred sire of sport horses who was also sired by Precipitation.

It is unclear where Big Ben's large 17.3 hands (71 inches, 180 cm) height came from in his pedigree. His ancestors ranged from 15.3 hands (63 inches, 160 cm) to 16.3 hands (67 inches, 170 cm), based on registration and studbook records.

Pedigree of Big Ben, chestnut horse foaled in 1976
Sire Etretat ch. 1970 Selle Français	Vagabond b. 1965; Selle Français	Enfant Terrible xx ch. 1957; Thoroughbred	Precipitation xx ch. 1933; Thoroughbred
Sire Etretat ch. 1970 Selle Français	Vagabond b. 1965; Selle Français	Enfant Terrible xx ch. 1957; Thoroughbred	Mahallat xx br. 1950; Thoroughbred
Sire Etretat ch. 1970 Selle Français	Vagabond b. 1965; Selle Français	Ossuna ch. 1958; Selle Français	Gagné Si Peu br. 1950; Selle Français
Sire Etretat ch. 1970 Selle Français	Vagabond b. 1965; Selle Français	Ossuna ch. 1958; Selle Français	Vaillante ch. 1943; Selle Français
Sire Etretat ch. 1970 Selle Français	Royal Route II xx br. 1962; Thoroughbred	Protee xx ch. 1946; Thoroughbred	Rovigo xx ch. 1925; Thoroughbred
Sire Etretat ch. 1970 Selle Français	Royal Route II xx br. 1962; Thoroughbred	Protee xx ch. 1946; Thoroughbred	Provocante xx ch. 1940; Thoroughbred
Sire Etretat ch. 1970 Selle Français	Royal Route II xx br. 1962; Thoroughbred	Route Royale xx b. 1955; Thoroughbred	Horatius xx br. 1936; Thoroughbred
Sire Etretat ch. 1970 Selle Français	Royal Route II xx br. 1962; Thoroughbred	Route Royale xx b. 1955; Thoroughbred	Rosapat xx br. 1947; Thoroughbred
Dam Oekie ch. 1968 Belgian Warmblood	Flevo br. 1964; Gelderlander	Artilleur br. 1959; Selle Français	Kami de l'Île (by Furioso) ch. 1954; Selle Français
Dam Oekie ch. 1968 Belgian Warmblood	Flevo br. 1964; Gelderlander	Artilleur br. 1959; Selle Français	Colombe; 1946; Selle Français
Dam Oekie ch. 1968 Belgian Warmblood	Flevo br. 1964; Gelderlander	Masara ch. 1948; Gelderlander	Graaf van Wittenstein ch. 1942; Gelderlander
Dam Oekie ch. 1968 Belgian Warmblood	Flevo br. 1964; Gelderlander	Masara ch. 1948; Gelderlander	Hara br. 1943; Gelderlander
Dam Oekie ch. 1968 Belgian Warmblood	Jekie ch. 1963; Gelderlander	Oregon br. 1950; Gelderlander	Kurassier br. 1946; Gelderlander
Dam Oekie ch. 1968 Belgian Warmblood	Jekie ch. 1963; Gelderlander	Oregon br. 1950; Gelderlander	Derka bl. 1939; Gelderlander
Dam Oekie ch. 1968 Belgian Warmblood	Jekie ch. 1963; Gelderlander	Oekie gr. 1950; Gelderlander	Helmar br. 1943; Gelderlander
Dam Oekie ch. 1968 Belgian Warmblood	Jekie ch. 1963; Gelderlander	Oekie gr. 1950; Gelderlander	Hennie gr. 1943; Gelderlander

== See also ==
- List of historical horses
