= Dutch Harness Horse =

Breed of horse

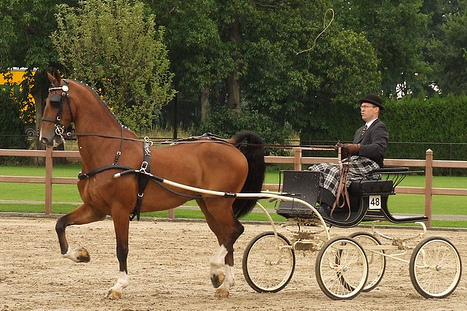
- Dutch Harness Horse at a horse show in the Netherlands
- Other names: Tuigpaard, KWPN Harness Horse
- Country of origin: Netherlands

Traits
- Distinguishing features: Fine carriage breed produced by strict selection, known for their high natural action, substance, and engagement of the hindend.

Breed standards
- KWPN; KWPN-NA

The Dutch Harness Horse, or Tuigpaard, is a warmblood breed of fine driving horse that has been developed in the Netherlands since the end of World War II. Their studbook is kept by the Koninklijk Warmbloed Paardenstamboek Nederland (Royal Warmblood Horse Studbook of the Netherlands) or KWPN. The breed is based on the native Groningen and Gelderland horses, which were formerly indispensable in agriculture and transportation services. Strict selection procedures and a clear breeding aim enabled breeders to produce a refined, high-stepping horse within a few decades. While with 40 sires and fewer than 2,000 broodmares the population is not large, Dutch Harness Horses are highly recognizable. In the past few years, a handful have come to North America, where they are used as sport horses and saddle seat horses alike.

== Characteristics ==
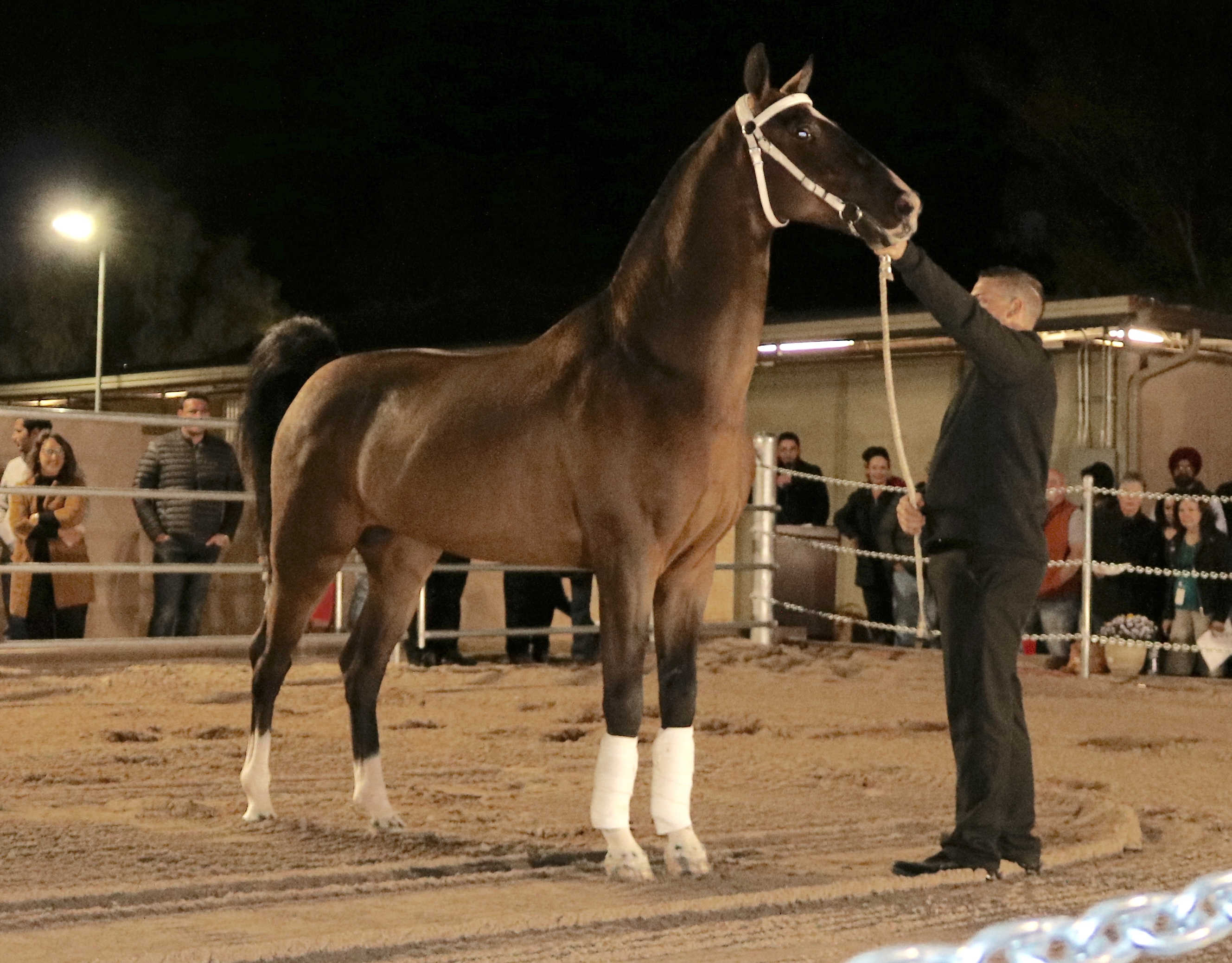
Dutch Harness Horse stallion exhibited in the USA

The Dutch Harness Horse is distinctive among warmbloods for its high action, and gaining popularity among those saddle seat aficionados who seek a larger, more substantial horse. They are traditionally shown with a braided mane and natural tail, and when shown in-hand often wear a white bridle without a cavesson. The hooves are usually allowed to grow longer than a riding horse's feet, but are never shod with weighted shoes. While the colors black, brown, bay and chestnut are most common, there are greys, true roans, and creme dilutes. Tuigpaarden are often very well-marked, and many have extensive sabino or rabicano markings. There are even some tobianos, though they are rare.

The expressive head is made up of straight lines and distinctly warmblood in type. It is usually narrow, long and quite dry, similar to the Saddlebred.

The neck is set on quite high, and the shoulders are uniformly long and powerful. The carriage of the head and the level croup with high-set tail distinguish the harness horses from their riding-type relatives. The longer back, more open loin, and flatter croup enable the hindlegs and forelegs to work independently and with great action. By comparison, the harness horse appears to stand higher off the ground.

Strict selection procedures mean that the Dutch Harness Horse is reasonably uniform in type and motion, and also means that the gait qualities of the horses are inherent. As the show horses are not asked to canter in harness, this gait receives less attention. The walk is diligent, but the trot is the true show gait. The forelegs are typically longer than the hindlegs - by design - and as such the horse will "sink" in the back and rise in the front. This quality is responsible for the powerful, active hind end and the great freedom in the forehand. These horses usually have a metronomic trot and ample suspension.

In comparison to the riding horse type, the Tuigpaarden are more hot and sensitive to the energy of a crowd. However, with the control of the stallion inspections, bad-tempered horses or those with poor constitutions are at the very least identified, if not culled outright. A dangerous stallion would never obtain breeding permission in the first place, and so the breed is reactive and courageous, but pleasant and kind.

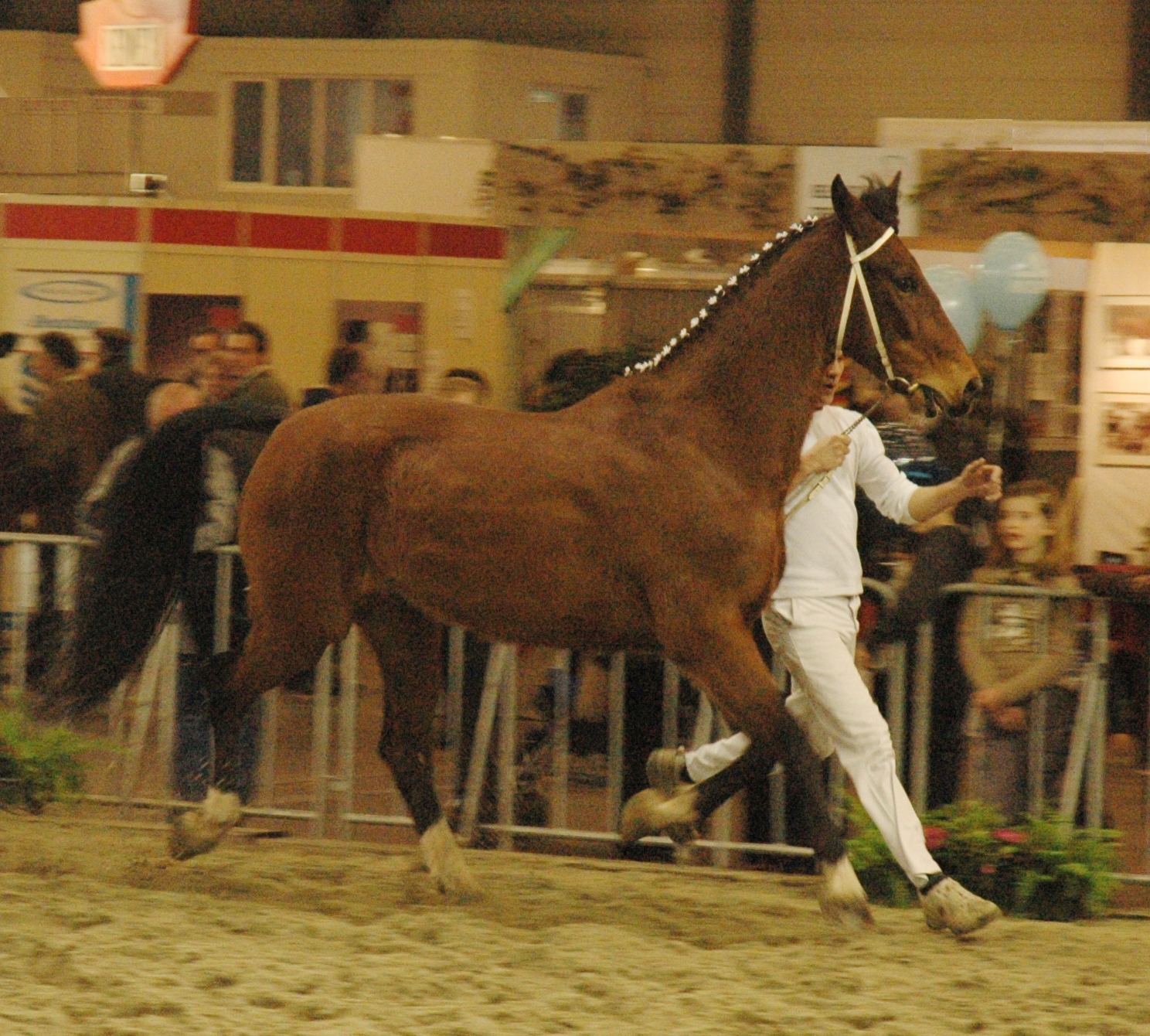
This Tuigpaard, at a Flanders regional agricultural show, turned out for exhibition in-hand.

Branding is now illegal in the Netherlands, so the lion-rampant brand of the KWPN appears on the left thigh of only older horses. Today, KWPN horses are microchipped instead.

The letter which begins a Dutch Harness Horse's name corresponds to his year of birth. Daughters are often given only a very slight variation of the dam's name, for example: 1988 was the "G" year, so the daughter of a mare named "Zilvia" was "Gilvia".

== History ==
The Dutch have a strong tradition of breeding driving horses, and during the late 19th century and early 20th century, these horses were known as "luxury horses." They consisted of two separate breeds: northern Groningens which were heavier and primarily dark colors, and Gelderlanders from the south which were taller, leggier, and usually chestnut. They were elegant, though heavy, carriage horses which could work on the farm too. Naturally, horse owners felt competitive about whose horse or horses were the finest and most showy. This was not forgotten when mechanization made agricultural horses obsolete and the driving horses needed a new occupation. The Royal Warmblood Horse Studbook of the Netherlands or KWPN was founded in 1969 and from the beginning featured a distinct studbook for driving horses.

Much of the development from heavy carriage horse to fine driving horse was completed within the native horse populations, however the influence of the Hackney stallion Cambridge Cole significantly helped the gene pool. Also influential was the chestnut American Saddlebred stallion, Immigrant (American Saddlebred Horse Association name Callaway's Mardi Gras), born in 1990. In comparison to his Dutch peers, his gaits were not considered impressive, but he did contribute his good character and dry type to the gene pool. Other Hackneys to cover Dutch Harness Horse mares were Marfleet Raffles and his son Grants Hornet, and Brook Acres Silversul. Currently the Hackney Horse stallions GTF Maker's Mark and Plain's Liberator are approved for use in Dutch Harness Horse breeding. A palomino American Saddlebred stallion, originally named Denmark's Golden Playboy, stood in the Netherlands as Holland's Golden Boy.

== Uses ==
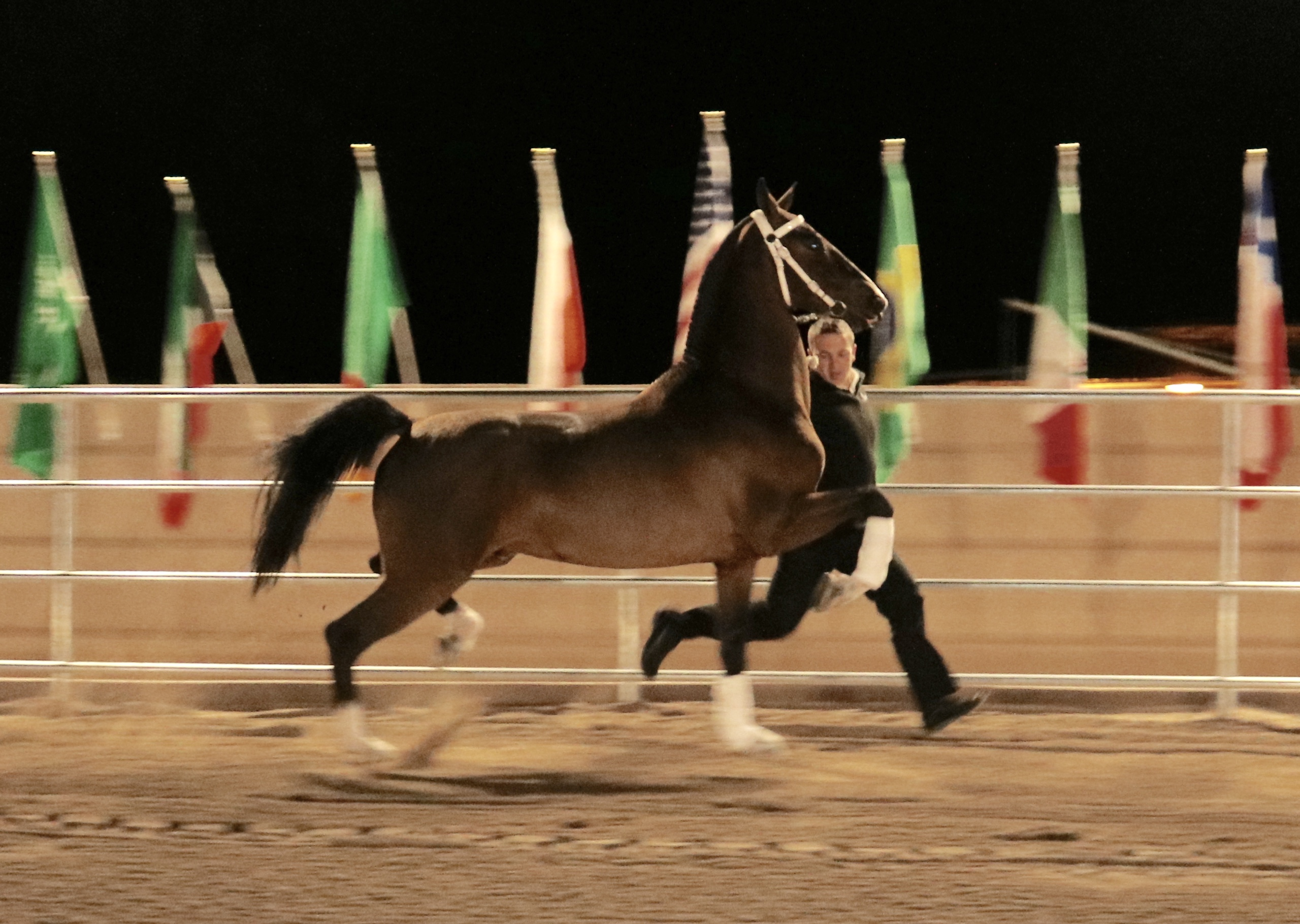
Dutch Harness stallion shod for in-hand exhibition in the United States

While most Tuigpaarden are shown in special fine harness competitions, they have also made their mark in combined driving. Several of the teams at the 2006 FEI World Equestrian Games were Dutch Harness Horses. A few have distinguished themselves in sport, rather than show, though they are the exception. Some of the successful sport Dutch Harness Horses include Constance Menard's Lianca and Anneke Muilwijk's Atuur, both of which compete in dressage.

The Dutch Harness Horse is unique from other high stepping trotting breeds in that it has strict shoeing rules for competition, the shoes must be within a certain width and thickness and no pads are allowed. This insures that the breed is sound and able to trot so spectacularly on its own accord, not because of special shoeing.

Of late, Dutch Harness Horses have been crossbred with Arabians in the United States to produce a more powerful horse for half-Arabian Saddle seat-style English pleasure, fine harness and "park" classes.

== Medical issues ==
Prior to licensing, Tuigpaard stallions must undergo a thorough vet check. Any horse with defects of the genitalia or bite, sub-par semen analysis, or any evidence of a congenital disorder or defect is not permitted to breed. A horse which has had surgery to correct a congenital abnormality is likewise culled. Furthermore, the stallions and elite performance mares must undergo a thorough radiographic exam of their joints. Horses with evidence of OCD lesions do not pass. For these reasons, the breed is healthy, sound, and long-lived. The primary concern facing the breed is inbreeding, due to the small size of the gene pool.

== See also ==
- Heavy warmblood
- Ostfriesen and Alt-Oldenburger
- Groningen Horse
- Gelderland (horse)
- Dutch Warmblood
- American Saddlebred
- Hackney (horse)
