= Ostfriesen and Alt-Oldenburger =

Breed of horse

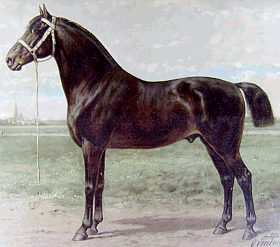
- 1898 lithograph depicting an Ostfriesen
- Country of origin: Germany
- Standard: Zuchtverband für das Ostfriesische und Alt-Oldenburger Pferd

The Alt-Oldenburger and Ostfriesen are representatives of a group of horse breeds primarily from continental Europe called heavy warmbloods. The breed has two names because the same horse was bred in two regions in the most north-western part of Germany: East Frisia and the former grand duchy of Oldenburg. The name "Alt-Oldenburger" – alt meaning "old" – simply distinguishes this horse from its descendant, the modern Oldenburg, which is bred for sport.

The AO/OF is bred by preservationists to fit the pre-World War model. Unlike the registries of the sport horses that followed them, their studbook is partly closed. However, external evaluation and performance testing of the breeding stock is still a key element in these registries.

== Geographic origins ==
The damp, low-lying region of Germany which lies between the Weser River and the Ems River is called Ostfriesland ("East Friesland"). It borders the Netherlands, and is part of a greater region traditionally known as Frisia. Frisia is characterized by the languages and dialects of the peoples who settled it, but also by its low-lying, coastal geography. In the west, it includes what are now the Dutch provinces of Friesland and Groningen; centrally, the Oldenburg region of Lower Saxony, and its northeastern region includes much of what is now Schleswig-Holstein to the border of Denmark. Frisia is the region best known for heavy warmbloods.

== Foundation ==
The word "Oldenburg" was first mentioned in reference to a town in 1108, and has had many meanings over the centuries. The name applies both to the city of Oldenburg, and also the surrounding rural district, and historically a state or Grand Duchy.

Prior to the 17th century, the horses of Oldenburg were of the same types found throughout Europe in the Middle Ages: small, hardy farm horses, smooth-stepping saddle horses, quicker "coursers", and a very few highly prized, powerful destriers. However, as the availability of firearms grew, heavily armored knights and their heavy mounts became impractical "relics of the past."

The Spanish horses, ancestors of the Andalusian, the Danish Fredriksborg, and the Neapolitan horse were particularly popular among the German nobility during the 17th and 18th centuries. As they collected these stallions, the residents bred them to their heavy mares. From this base of thick, primarily dark-colored horses, the Groningen, Friesian, East Friesian, and Oldenburg would eventually be born.

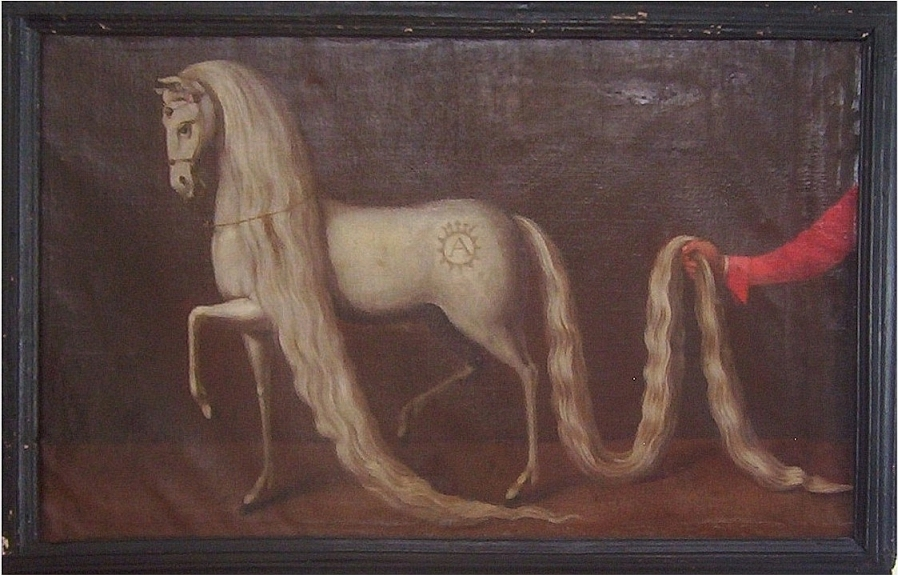
Kranich, an Oldenburg stallion bred by Anton Günther around 1640, shows Spanish influence that was popular at the time

The horses of Oldenburg have never had a State Stud, and they first gained recognition under Anton Günther (1583–1667), Count of Oldenburg, who is said to have taken great personal interest in the breeding of horses. Count Anton Günther returned from a trip lasting several years with a number of horses he admired in Spain, Italy, Turkey, and Poland. Later, a gift of Oldenburg horses kept the Count of Tilly from sacking Anton Günther's dominion.

While the breeding of horses in Ostfriese and Oldenburg was driven primarily by the nobles, without the aid of a studbook registry, the world's first ever stallion Körung occurred in the region. In 1715, Georg Albrecht Prince of Ostfriese adopted this practice of rigorous evaluation of potential herd sires. The Körung process spread to Oldenburg in 1755 even though state-mandated stallion inspections were almost 100 years in the future. The results were excellent, and the products were in high demand and exported for carriage driving.

While the breeders at Celle developed a more refined cavalry mount around 1800, those of the Frisian marshlands sought out Cleveland Bays and Yorkshire carriage horses in greater numbers. The results were solid, good-natured heavy coaching horses, which were molded into a stable mare base by the mid-17th century.

Following the state regulation of stallion inspections in 1820, the breeders of Oldenburg horses formed their own registry in 1861 and the breeders of the Ostfriesen horses did the same in 1869. Both employed rigorous selection along similar breeding goals, though up until the 20th century, few breeders kept pedigrees, and many mares and stallions were unregistered. However, participation improved as the 19th century came to a close and the threat of obsoletion became quite real. At this time, technological and economic developments were rendering irrevocable changes for the horse. Suited for the simple labor of unmechanized agriculture, the horses were now overshadowed by the versatile, powerful horses of Hanover, England, and Normandy.

== The Karossier ==
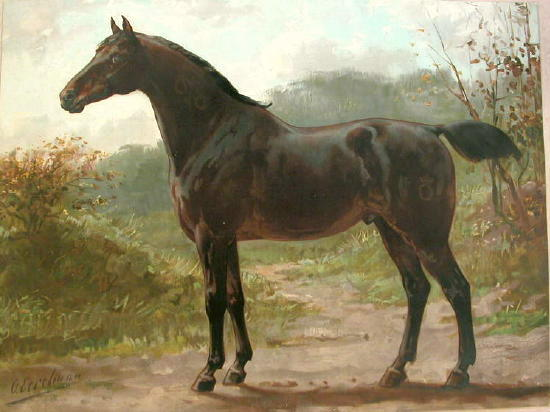
1898 lithograph of a carriage-type Oldenburg, showing the traditional neck brand and "O" and crown on left hip

The heyday of the elegant heavy carriage horse was the years between 1880 and 1920. Reporting from a local horse market in 1864, an observer writes that each year the sale has more horses to offer, all well-bred and beautiful, and that their buyers came from far and wide. "Trading is brisk, especially for the luxury horses, for which high prices are paid". Producing Ostfriesen and Oldenburg horses had become quite lucrative. They were exported even to the southern reaches of the German-speaking region; Oldenburg stallions populated the freshly rebuilt Bavarian State Stud of Schwaiganger from 1870 on. Their success was such that in a very important decision, the stud commission of the Saxon State Stud of Moritzburg developed a heavy warmblood plan in 1873 which aimed to produce a horse "similar in type to that of the Oldenburger". From 1877 and 1920, two thirds of the state stallions were Oldenburgers. The first part of the 20th century saw the State Stud of Zweibrücken follow suit.

The population of horses in Ostfriesland alone exceeded 30,000, about 40% of which were 3 years old or younger. The new breeding direction, calling for a strong, attractive, heavy horse "for use as both an elegant, high-stepping carriage horse and a work horse" was fruitful. The Körkommission in particular looked for excellent trot mechanics in the stallion selection.

In Oldenburg, the progress towards the Karossier type hinged on the use of Anglo-Normans, Cleveland Bays, and halfbred Hanoverians, and had advanced so well that already a considerable number of Oldenburgs were being sent to Ostfriesland. Soon all the Ostfriesen stallion lines were headed in the same, new direction. 1910 was the height of Ostfriesen horse breeding. The type was described as possessing a distinct outline, strong foundation and a friendly, expressive head, not to mention the "certain elegance about the whole appearance." In 1911 a spectator at the Körung in Aurich noted that three types reappeared year after year:

A) A horse similar to the Oldenburg, a type of noble, heavy Karossier with a swinging gait and great nerve, though slightly drier than most Oldenburgs;
B) A horse with reference to the Oldenburg type, though they are not always very distinctly outlined, and are without much nobility and usually quite common, but they are massive, robust, compact and strong. These stallions are excellent sires for agricultural horses,

C) An elegant, easy-mannered horse, which is influencing the Hanoverian and which the Hanoverian is more or less approaching. This type is most often an elegant chestnut, and is relatively rare.

These are the horses that made Oldenburg famous for elegant carriage horses.

== War era ==
After World War I broke out, the market for luxury horses suddenly became the market for military remounts. The increased availability of cars and tractors limited the roles that horses could play in agriculture and transportation. Starting in the forties, technical advancements in agricultural machinery initially required a new type of horse, but soon after made the horse superfluous altogether in the field. So to adapt, starting in 1920 the direction changed radically: a heavy warmblood of great economy with a good walk, calm temperament, which matures early and utilizes its feed well. The type was so heavy, it stood on the boundary with the lighter coldbloods. The coldbloods of Germany were already well-suited to the new demands of farming given their immense power, and the Ostfriesen had to prove it could offer these same qualities. The one advantage for the warmbloods was their versatility. They were subsequently bred to have greater depth, breadth and strength, at the expense of the dryness, nerve, expression and gait qualities for which they had previously been selected. From 1908 to 1940, the average height of Ostfriesisches decreased 4 cm while average weight increased from 630 kg to 760 kg. Other regions began to breed heavy warmbloods: Baden-Württemberg, Hesse, Bavaria, Thuringia, Saxony-Anhalt, Saxony, and Silesia. While they were founded on their own stock, horses from Oldenburg and Ostfriesland were sold there each year to help them realize their goals. The end of World War II saw the breeding in Ostfriesland reach record-breaking numbers, as these horses had become indispensable agricultural horses. In 1923 the two registries merged to form the Verband der Züchter des Oldenburger Pferdes e.V. (Oldenburg Horse Breeders' Association), which today serves the modern Oldenburg.

== Post-war era ==
By 1964, in the face of the superiority of tractors, the breeding of the heavy warmblood had completely collapsed. Stallions covered 10% of the mares that they had 20 years before. This scene played out in the 1950s and 60s throughout German horse breeding. During this time, though, increasing leisure time meant that horses soon found their modern cultural niche: recreational riding. The breeders of Ostfriesland aimed to develop their horses along this path, producing a lighter riding horse with all the economical traits that had made them popular before. Fearing that the Thoroughbred would detract from the amenable nature of their horses, the Ostfriesen breeders chose to use Arabian blood instead. Beginning in 1948, such stallions were made available to the breeders, who scarcely used them, being hard-put to change their beloved horses so drastically. However, the evidence was convincing, as the Freisen-Arabs were horses of excellent character, great capacity and riding quality. Unfortunately, they had missed the mark: the market demanded a light, elegant, but tall riding horses, and the Freisen-Arabs were smaller than their warmblood mothers. Limited in their competitiveness in dressage and jumping, the Freisen-Arabs did not sell, and the Ostfriesen horses seemed doomed to extinction. Meanwhile, the Oldenburg horses were being systematically redirected by the use of Anglo-Norman stallions like Condor, Thoroughbreds like Adonis xx, and Anglo-Arabs like Inschallah AA. Though the blood remained in their pedigrees, the Alt-Oldenburg mares could not produce stallion sons. Purebred Ostfriesisch-Oldenburg stallions were replaced in the studrows by Hanoverians, Trakehners, Thoroughbreds and Arabs. In 1967, 71% of the original mares had riding horse mates. The Ostfriesen mares were permitted into the Hanoverian forebook after producing a noble warmblood foal, but could not become stallion mothers. The last körung at Aurich took place in 1973, and in 1975 the Ostfriesische studbook became a district association of the Hanoverian Verband. The products of this new breeding direction became the modern Oldenburg (horse).

== Rescue ==
By the mid-eighties the stock of purebred mares had dwindled to just a handful, though there were some mares only a generation or two removed. In 1983 a group of supporters formed a special breed association under the jurisdiction of the Weser-Ems Studbook, approving stallions that were half-Hanoverian, half-Ostfriesen or Alt-Oldenburg. However, as the mares themselves were typically only halfbred, the foals did not have the desired type, and furthermore the genepool was simply too small. To replenish it, the breeders looked to the studs where Ostfriesen/Alt-Oldenburger stallions had stood for generations, picking up a few horses here and there. More horses came from greater strongholds: Silesian Heavy Warmbloods of Poland, the Danish Oldenbourgs, and the Groningen horse of the Netherlands. But the efforts of Dr. Herta Steiner, Moritzburg State Stud Equerry, were the keystone to saving the breed. She had championed for the last remaining heavy warmbloods in Saxony and Thuringia. Soon the old type was revived.

Since 1995, two Dutch Harness Horse stallions have been chosen to add elegance and responsiveness, though it is worth noting that these stallions had primarily Ostfriesen and Groningen pedigrees themselves, and no Hackney blood. The Zuchtverband für das Ostfriesische und Alt-Oldenburger Pferd e.V. ("Association for the Breeding of East Freisian and Old-Oldenburg Horses") was founded in 1986, and was recognized as an independent organization in 1988. Even after 20 years of hiatus, the goal is to produce a heavy, quality horse, responsive with an exceptionally good temperament. The unique character of the former farm horse is of paramount importance, as it was the peasant farms that led such kind horses to be bred in the first place. The breeding objective these days stretches back before the horses were called to haul tractors and artillery, to when they were heavy, elegant, and impressive Karossiers.

== The Ostfriesen and Alt-Oldenburg today ==
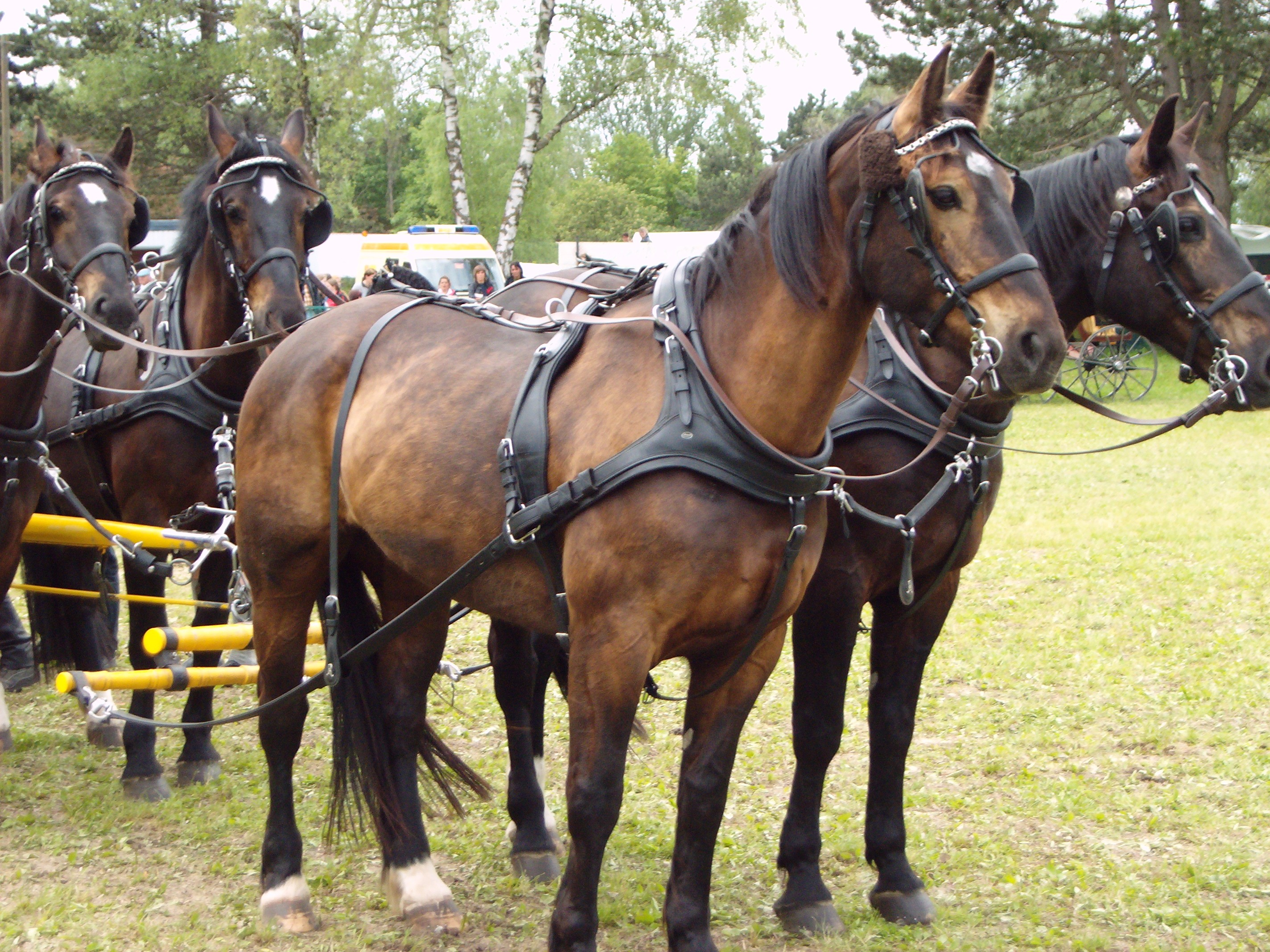
A team of Ostfriesen/Alt-Oldenburger geldings

Today there are 20 approved stallions and 160 broodmares in the northern population of heavy warmbloods. They are bred with a pure-breeding scheme, using Ostfriesen/Alt-Oldenburg, Groningen, Saxony-Thuringian Heavy Warmbloods, and Silesian Heavy Warmbloods. The goal is a versatile, correct and balanced horse with a calm temperament. Desirable is a horse with a strong constitution, peaceful companionable temperament, which utilizes its feed well, has high fertility, and is suitable as a riding and driving horse. The walk and trot should be efficient and expansive, the latter with some action. The physique should speak of a moderately elegant horse of great depth and breadth, well-sprung ribs and a strong hind end. The head should be expressive with a large, friendly eye. The neck is muscular, medium-length, well-formed and set high on a long, sloping, muscular shoulder with defined withers. The back is medium-long, solid and elastic with a broad loin, the croup slightly sloped, wide and muscular. The limbs should be correct and dry with great bone strength, very strong joints suited to the horse's size, ending in the all-important well-shaped hooves.

At three years the horse is expected to stand between 158 and 165 cm tall, with a canon circumference of 22 to 24 cm. The primary colors are black, seal brown, and dark bay, though bay, chestnut, and grey do occur. Typically, they are conservatively marked. They are traditionally shown in a wide white leather bridle without the cavesson.

Because of their gentle natures, Ostfriesen/Alt-Oldenburgers are useful not just in sport and driving, but for recreation, police work and therapeutic riding. They are also used in forests for ecological reasons.

Fourteen black Ostfriesen/Alt-Oldenburg geldings were sold recently to the Household Cavalry.

== See also ==
- Warmblood
- List of German horse breeds
