= Rox Dene =

- Breed: Dutch Warmblood/Thoroughbred
- Sex: Mare
- Foaled: 1986
- Color: Gray
- Breeder: Susan H. Hice in Marshall, Virginia
- Owner: Elaine and Chanda Boylen
- Rider: Laura Kent-Kraut, Bert Mutch, Rodney Bross, and Elizabeth Solter

Rox Dene (named after Roxdene of Bermuda) was one of the most notable horses to ever compete in hunter competition in the United States. She is considered "Hunter Horse of the Century." Breeding was by Aristos B , out of Ninety Nine by Frosty Hai.

The mare won championships at nearly every major horse show, and held the title of USEF Horse of the Year from 1991-1995. She is often held as a standard by which modern hunter horses are judged, possessing an almost perfect jumping form with great bascule, high knees and tight folding at the knees and ankles , excellent movement, and wonderful conformation.

Rox Dene's competitive career ended in 1996, and she took up the new role as a brood mare. Her owners began with embryo transfer, but the embryos did not take in the surrogate dams, so she was instead bred using artificial insemination (AI). She produced two healthy foals using this technique, a chestnut colt named "Rocky Rules" and a bay filly named "Roxy" , foaled two years apart. However, her 2000 breeding was lost 5 months after conception, and she lost her 2002 and 2003 foals in the first few months as well.

The Boylens decided to retry breeding Rox Dene using embryo transfer. She was bred to Popeye K, another Dutch Warmblood hunter, by whom she produced the filly Eyelet ("Poppy"); who is being successfully shown in green hunter divisions by Jennifer Alfano as "Rose Hill."

Rox Dene retired to Pine Meadow Farm in Vass, NC.

Rox Dene has also had a Breyer Horse Model made in her likeness.

== Sources ==
- Equus Magazine #340. February 2006. Pg 29-32.
