= Groninger =

Dutch breed of horse

- Conservation status: FAO (2007): endangered-maintained; DAD-IS (2026): at risk/endangered; SZH (2026): critical
- Other names: Groningen; Groninger Paard; Groningse paard
- Country of origin: Netherlands

Traits
- Weight: Male: 650 kg; Female: 600 kg
- Height: Male: 165 cm; Female: 160 cm

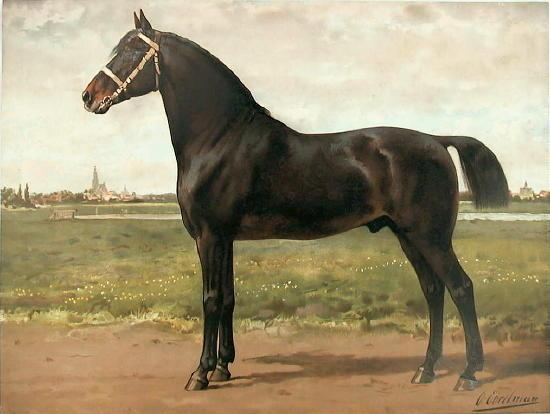
Lithograph by Otto Eerelman, 1898

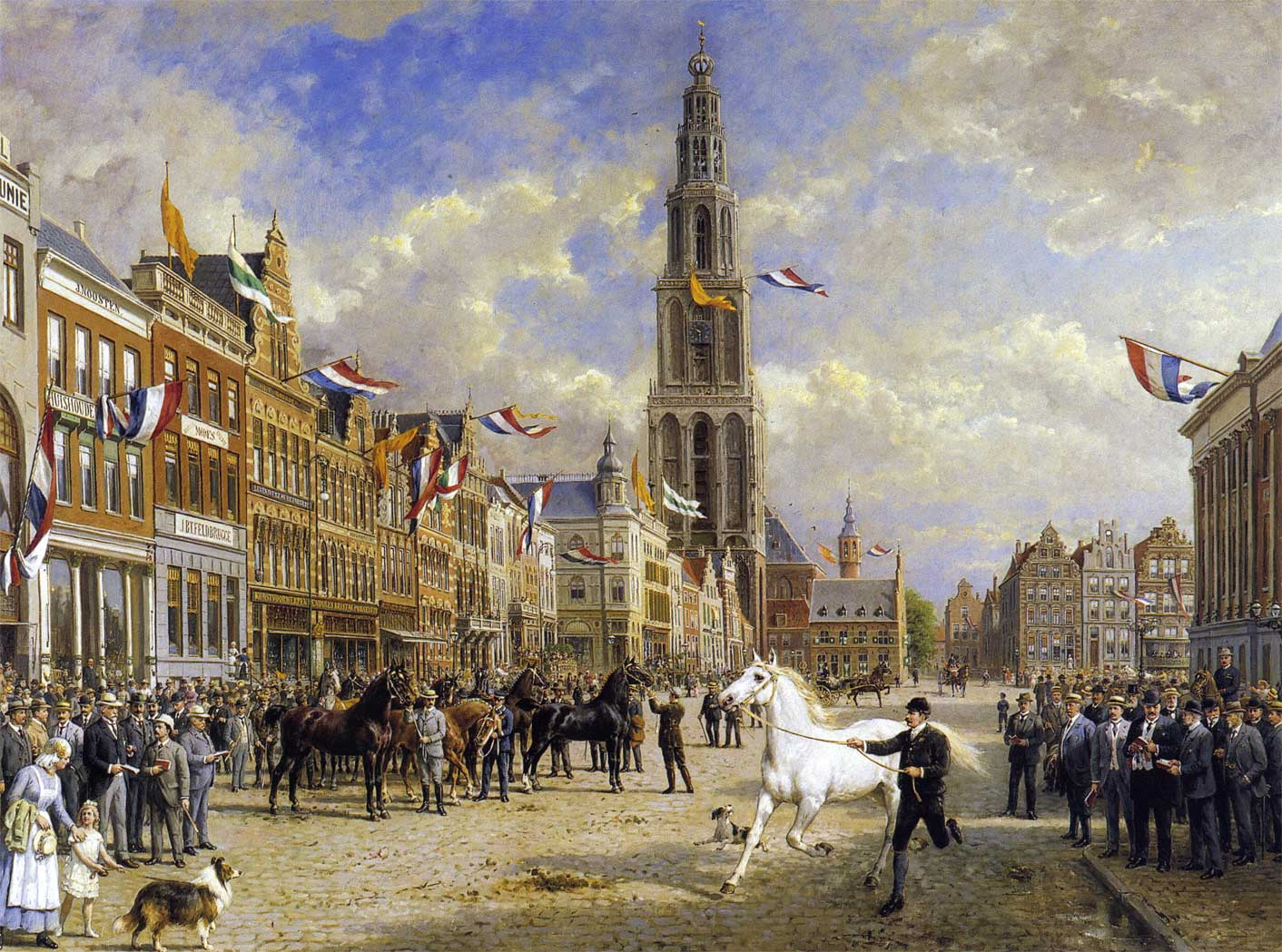
Otto Eerleman, Paardenkeuring op de Grote Markt, 1920 – horse showing in Groningen

The Groninger or Groningen is a Dutch breed of heavy warmblood horse. In 1965 it was merged with the Gelderlander to form the Dutch Warmblood or KWPN stud-book. Few of the original type remained, and by 1978 only one stallion could be found. A new breed society – the Vereniging Het Groninger Paard – was formed in 1982 with the remaining stallion and about twenty mares.

In the twenty-first century it is an endangered breed: its conservation status is listed by the Stichting Zeldzame Huisdierrassen as 'critical'.

== History ==
The Groninger shares much of its initial foundation with the Friesian, East Friesian and Alt-Oldenburger, and Holsteiner: small native farm horses and medieval destriers were influenced by popular Spanish, Neapolitan, and Arabian horses in the 17th and 18th centuries. Horses like England's Cleveland Bay were also utilized, producing a horse that was tall by the standards of the day, as well as reasonably elegant with deep, wide haunches and a thick, high-set neck.

Although selection procedures had been in use for many years, the first Dutch horse registries weren't founded until the late 19th and early 20th centuries. The North-Netherlands Warmblood Horse Studbook, or NWP, regulated horse breeding in Groningen, Friesland, and Drenthe, while the NSTg did the same for the southern regions, including Gelderland. The goals of the registries were characterized by distinct differences in the soil composition: Groningen had heavy, wet, clay soil and needed a particularly stout horse to till it, while the soil in Gelderland was sandier.

Nevertheless, both studbooks aimed to produce a horse that could perform farm work, retaining as much elegance as possible to make them attractive carriage horses. This goal echoed that of neighboring East Frisia and Oldenburg, regions with which breeding stock were freely exchanged. The NWP also utilized Holsteiners, which were rumored to have been influenced by the horses of Dutch immigrants. In reality, all parts of the region known as Frisia have ties beyond the similarity of their soil and weather.

The result of these exchanges was that at the turn of the century, the Groninger, East Friesian, Oldenburger, and Holsteiner were calm, substantial farm and carriage horses with primarily dark coats.

In the 1920s and 30's, horses were bred to be rather heavier, fulfilling the roles of tractor horse and artillery horse, though the lighter Karossier type was still present in all populations.

Following the wars, the breeding of heavy agricultural horses collapsed, and the breeders had to adapt. In 1964, the southern studbook opened a "Sportregister" with the aim of producing riding horses, and in 1969 the NWP and southern studbook merged to form the KWPN, the Royal Warmblood Horse Studbook of the Netherlands. There was a studbook for riding horses, a studbook for driving horses, and a studbook for Gelderlanders. All of the Groninger stallions lost their breeding approval, and mare owners were encouraged to breed them to foreign stallions. The breed was sure to disappear.

In 1978, the last remaining NWP Groninger stallion, Baldewijn, was saved from the butcher. A small group of interested breeders pooled their genetic resources – 20 mares and Baldewijn – and in 1982 formed a private association. In 1985 this association, called simply "The Groningen Horse", was recognized by Royal Decree and by the European Union 10 years later.

Alt-Oldenburg/East Friesian, Silesian, East-German, and Holsteiner horses of the appropriate type were used to re-establish the Groninger, as well as one Cleveland Bay stallion. Today there are 25 approved stallions and over 400 mares.

A foal

== Characteristics ==
The breed standard calls for a correct horse; heavy, with the legs about half the horse's height, and a rectangular frame, with the body from point-of-shoulder to point-of-buttock about 10% greater than the height of the horse at the withers. The topline is level, muscular neck set on fairly high, and the loins and haunches are broad and powerful. The head is workman-like and the hooves large and sound. Ideal height is between 15.3 and 16.1 hands high at the withers.

In motion, the walk is diligent with a long stride, the trot is brisk and economical with some action, and the canter is of sufficient quality. The canter was not of great importance to the breeders, who did not have need for a heavy galloping horse, and so this gait is not as strong or expressive as the trot.

The horses are known for their even temperaments, though they are seldom spiritless. They are described as "sober" with a tremendous work ethic. Dark colors predominate: almost 90% are black or some shade of bay.
