= Gelderlander =

Dutch breed of horse

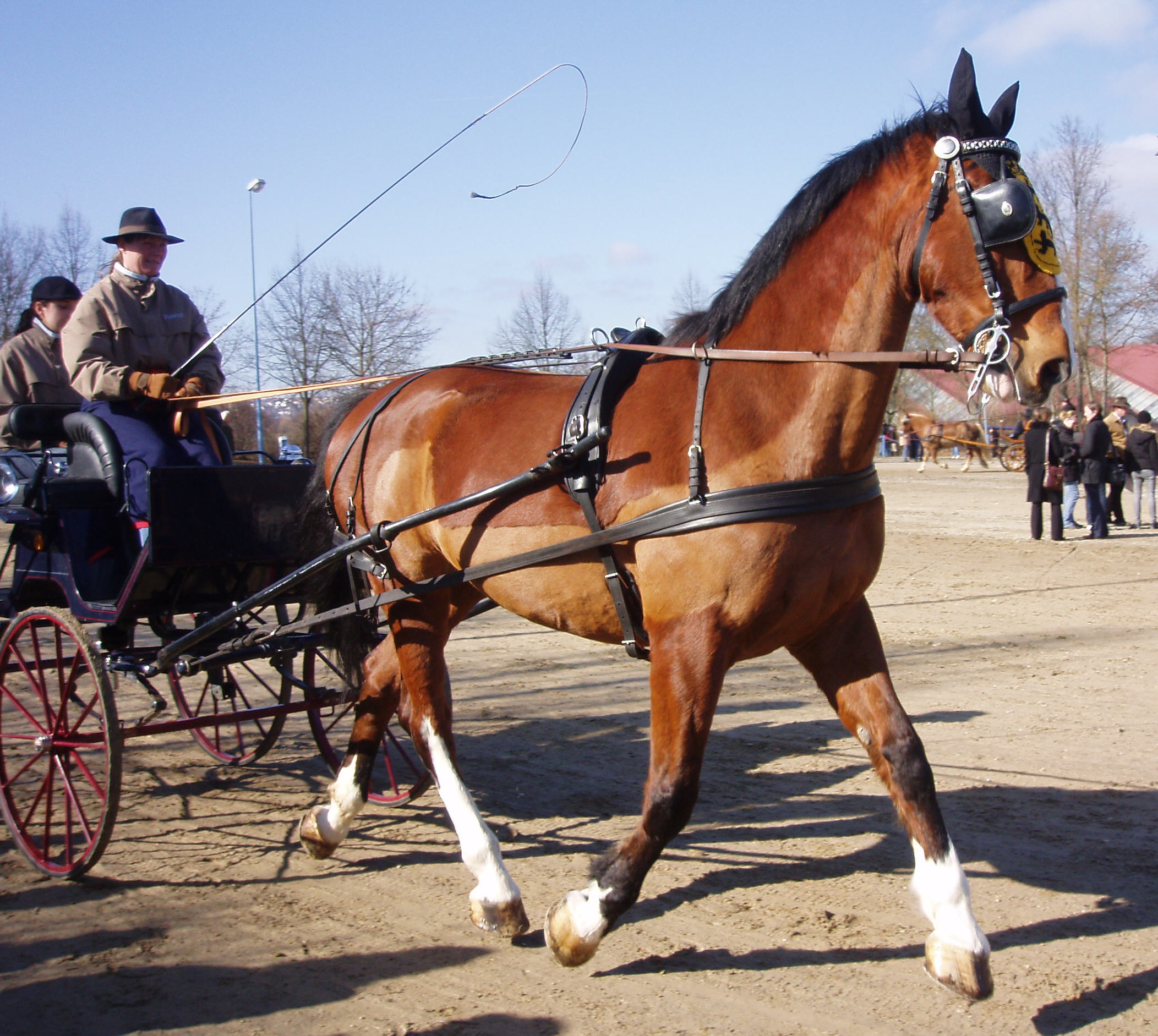
- In harness

- Pair of geldings in competition at Rennes
- Conservation status: FAO (2007): endangered-maintained; DAD-IS (2021): endangered
- Other names: Gelders Paard; Basispaard
- Country of origin: Netherlands
- Standard: KWPN
- Use: competitive carriage driving

Traits
- Weight: 600 kg
- Height: Male: 168 cm; Female: 165 cm
- Colour: most often chestnut

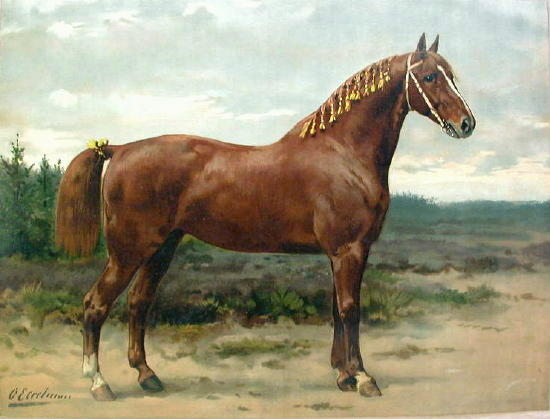
Lithograph by Otto Eerelman, 1898

The Gelderlander is a Dutch breed of warmblood horse. It was bred in the province of Gelderland in the Netherlands as a carriage horse capable also of farm work. In 1965 it was one of the foundation breeds of the Dutch Warmblood or KWPN, the other being the heavier Groninger horse from the north. It is registered in a division of the Royal Dutch Sport Horse stud-book, which also has divisions for the Dutch Warmblood and for the Dutch Harness Horse.

In the twenty-first century it is an endangered breed; in 2017 the breeding population numbered 600 mares and 35 stallions.

== History ==
The Gelderlander was bred from the late nineteenth century in the province of Gelderland in the Netherlands as a carriage horse capable also of farm work, and with some capability as a heavy riding horse. Local mares were cross-bred with imported stallions of a wide range of breeds and types, among them Alt-Oldenburger and Ostfriesen, Anglo-Arab, Arab, Cleveland Bay, English half-bred, Furioso, Hackney, Nonius, Norfolk Roadster, Orlov and Orlov-Rostopchin.

In 1969 the Vereniging tot bevordering van de Landbouwtuigpaardenfokkerij in Nederland, (Note: roughly 'association for the promotion of agricultural harness horse breeding in Holland') which registered the Gelderlander, was merged with the Nederlands Warmbloed Paard stud-book, which registered the Groninger, to form the Koninklijk Warmbloed Paardenstamboek Nederland or Royal Dutch Sport Horse stud-book. In this, three breed types were registered: riding horses (the Dutch Warmblood); harness horses (the Dutch Harness Horse); and the Gelderlander.

In 2005 a new breeders' association, the Gelderlander Paard Associatie, was formed to preserve the original type of the Gelderlander.

== Characteristics ==
The Gelderlander is most often chestnut, often with extensive white markings; skewbald colouring occurs rarely. Stallions and geldings usually stand about 168 cm (16.2hh) at the withers, mares a few centimetres less; average body weight is about 600 kg.

== Uses ==
The Gelderlander is much used in competitive carriage driving; it jumps well and reliably but is not fast.
