= Dutch Warmblood =

Dutch breed of horse

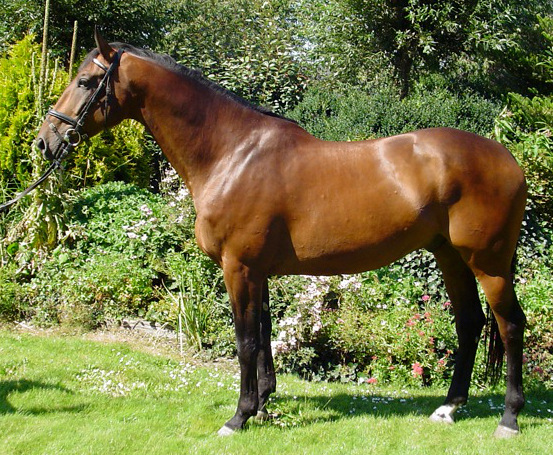

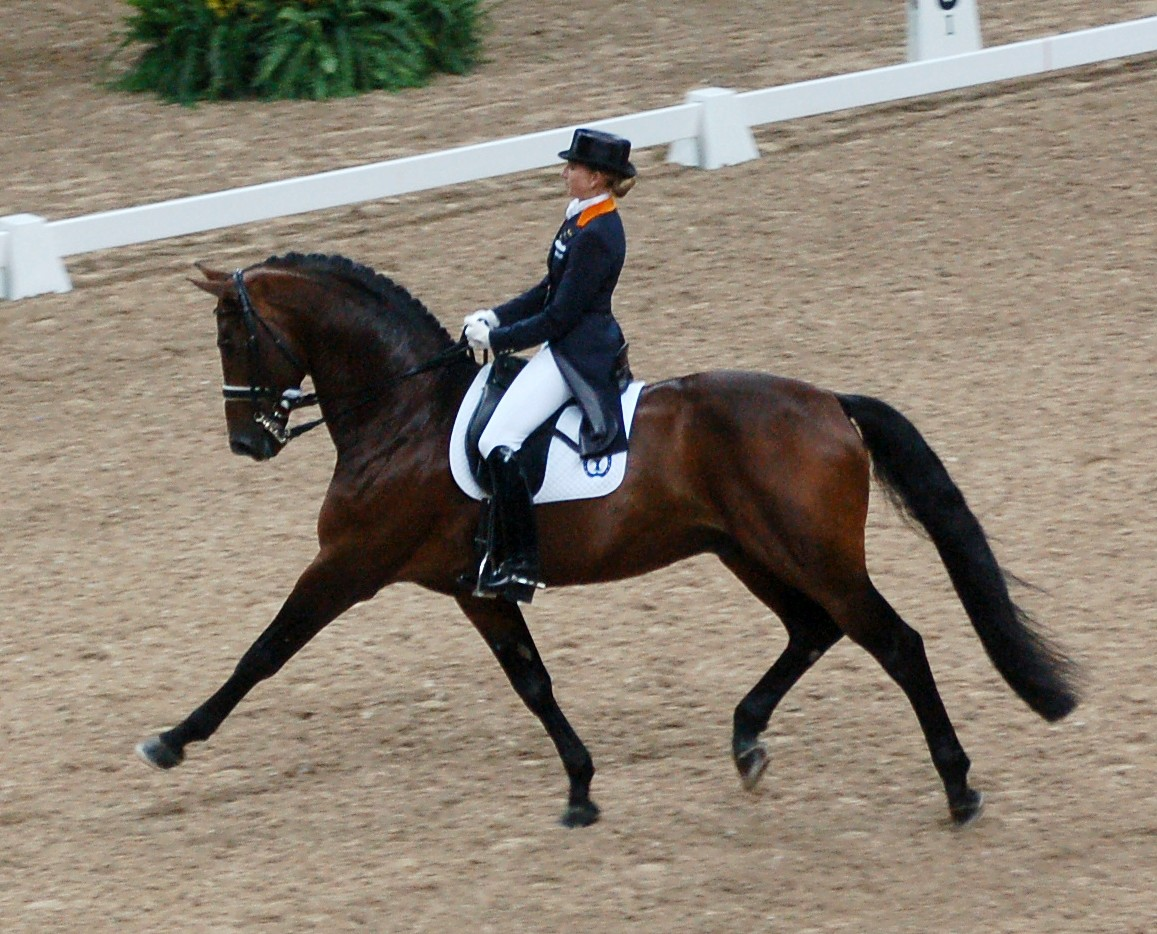
- Other names: Dutch Riding Horse
- Country of origin: Netherlands

Traits
- Distinguishing features: Modern warmblood horse suitable for dressage and show jumping.

Breed standards
- Royal Warmblood Horse Studbook of the Netherlands

A Dutch Warmblood or KWPN is a breed of warmblood horse registered with the Royal Dutch Sport Horse stud-book, which governs the breeding of competitive dressage and show jumping horses, as well as the show harness horse and Gelderlander, and a hunter studbook in North America. Developed through a breeding program that began in the 1960s, the Dutch Warmbloods are some of the most successful competition horses developed in postwar Europe.

== History ==
Prior to World War II, there were two types of utility horse in the Netherlands: Gelderlanders bred in the south under the Gelderlander Horse Studbook (1925) and the Groningen bred in the north under the NWP (1943). The Groningen was, and still is, a heavy-set warmblood horse very similar to the Alt-Oldenburger and East Friesian. The Gelderlander was a more elegant variation, often serving as a carriage horse in addition to a useful draft horse. While the Groningen were almost unwaveringly solid black, brown, or dark bay, the Gelderlanders were more often chestnut with flashy white markings. These two registries merged to form the Royal Warmblood Horse Studbook of the Netherlands (KWPN).

After the Second World War, the Gelderlander and Groninger were replaced by tractors and cars, and horses began to become a luxury rather than a necessity. As early as the 1950s, stallions like the French-bred L'Invasion and Holsteiner Normann were imported to encourage a change in the type of Dutch horses, followed soon after by the Holsteiner Amor and Hanoverian Eclatant. The carriage-pulling foundation stock contributed their active, powerful front ends and gentle dispositions to the Dutch Warmblood.

Today the KWPN comprises four sections: the Gelderlander, the Tuigpaard or Dutch Harness Horse, and riding horses bred for either dressage or show jumping.

== Characteristics ==
Dutch law has made branding illegal, so today only the oldest Dutch Warmbloods from the Netherlands still bear the lion-rampant brand on the left hip. Instead, the horses are microchipped. However, North American Dutch Warmbloods may still be branded. To become a breeding horse, mares must stand at least 15.2 hands (62 inches, 157 cm) and stallions at least 15.3 hands (63 inches, 160 cm) at the withers. There is no upper height limit, though too-tall horses are impractical for sport and not desirable.

Most Dutch Warmbloods are black, brown, bay, chestnut, or grey, and white markings are common. The population also has a number of tobiano horses from the influence of the approved stallion Samber, though a second tobiano stallion has not been approved since.

Breeding goals calls for dressage and showjumping horses to be suitable for Grand Prix level riding, while hunter and harness horses should be able to perform at the highest level in their sport. Strict selection procedures ensure that bad-tempered stallions and mares do not go on to produce unmanageable horses, however, the Dutch Warmblood is significantly more sensitive than its Gelderlander and Groningen ancestors. Performance test results allow breeders and buyers to identify horses with amateur-suitable temperaments. All Dutch Warmbloods are selected to be uncomplicated to handle and ride. Among the dressage horses, cooperativeness is paramount as an element of the submission required in that sport. From the show jumpers, a level of courage and reflexivity is required to effectively navigate a course.

Since the turn of the millennium, Dutch Warmblood breeding has shifted from breeding a "riding horse" to further specialization into dressage type and jumper type horses. The reason behind the choice for specialisation is the negative genetic correlation between the ability for dressage and show jumping. By dividing the whole population in two subpopulations, faster genetic progress can be achieved in both traits compared to simultaneous selection in the whole population.

To protect against losing canter quality in the dressage horse and conformation, gaits and rideability in the jumper type, genetic material continues to be freely exchanged between the two types.

The Dutch Warmblood is long-legged but substantial with a smooth topline and dry, expressive head. They are built level to uphill in a rectangular frame. A number of traits are desirable in both directions, such as "long lines" or a rectangular frame, "balanced proportions" and attractiveness. The requirements for the two types differ in the desired interior qualities, but also in form. The exact outline of the Dutch Warmblood varies depending on the pedigree.

== Medical issues ==
Dutch Warmbloods are sound and long-lived due to the stringent requirements placed on stallions and elite mares. While mild navicular changes, sesamoids, pastern arthritis and bone spavin may be permitted on radiographs, osteochondrosis in the hock or stifle is not allowed. Horses are disqualified from breeding for congenital eye defects, over- or underbite, or a lack of symmetry in stifles, hocks, hooves, or movement.

== Uses ==
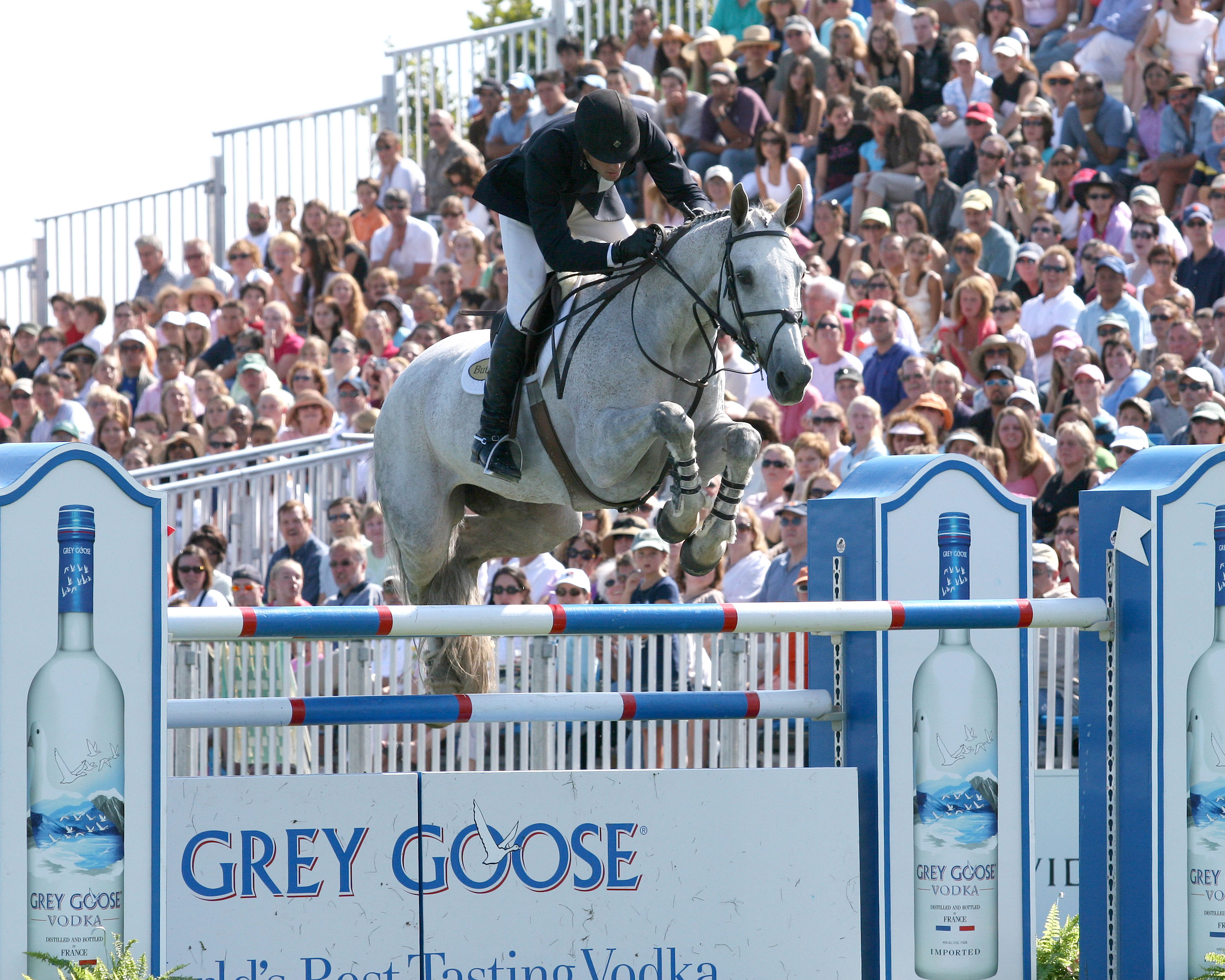
Dutch Warmblood mare show jumping at the Grand Prix level

In 2010, Dutch Warmbloods were ranked #1 in jumping by the World Breeding Federation for Sport Horses (WBFSH). as well as in dressage. A few of the recent Olympic medalists bred in the Netherlands include Royal Kaliber, Montender, Authentic (Nimrod),Mac Kinley in 2004, De Sjiem in 2000 and Hickstead in 2008.

Recent Dutch Warmblood Olympic medal-winners in dressage include Ferro and Udon. The Dutch Warmblood stallion Moorlands Totilas held the world record for the highest dressage score in Grand Prix Freestyle Dressage, and won three gold medals at the 2010 FEI World Equestrian Games. The current World Record holder for Grand Prix Freestyle Dressage is Valegro, with British rider Charlotte Dujardin. Valegro is KWPN sired by Negro.

In North America, the Dutch Warmblood is preferred for the hunter ring. Rox Dene, named "Hunter of the Century" by the Chronicle of the Horse, was sired by the Dutch Warmblood stallion Aristos B. The North American branch of the KWPN has begun selection for Dutch Hunter horses; one of the first approved stallions was a Dutch Warmblood named Popeye K. Rox Dene was later bred to Popeye K.

A Dutch warmblood stallion by the name of Uraeus was cast in the role of Brego in The Lord of the Rings.
