= Neapolitan horse =

Breed of horse

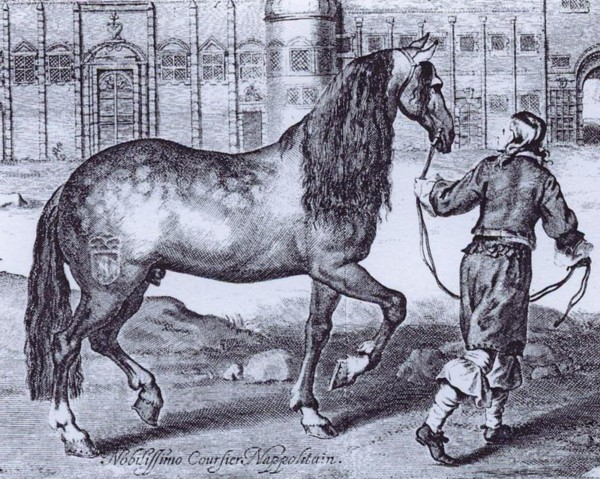
- 17th-century engraving of a Neapolitan horse
- Other names: Neapolitan Horse, Cavallo Napoletano
- Country of origin: Italy, native to Campania

Breed standards
- Associzione Italiana Allevatori

The Neapolitan Horse, Italian: (Cavallo) Napoletano, Neapolitano or Napolitano, is a horse breed that originated in the plains between Naples and Caserta, in the Campania region of Italy, but which may have been bred throughout the Kingdom of Naples. The Neapolitan horse was frequently mentioned in literature from the 16th to the 19th centuries, and is noted for its quality. Corte wrote in 1562: "in Italy the horses of the Kingdom of Naples are greatly esteemed; [there] many fine coursers are born ... suitable for use in war and in the manège and for every service that the rider may require". The decline of the breed was noted in the early 20th century by Mascheroni (1903) and Fogliata (1908). Some sources state that by 1950, the original Neapolitan horse was deemed extinct, but its lines were incorporated into other breeds, most notably the Lipizzaner. An attempt to recreate this breed resulted in the modern breed called Napolitano.

== Description ==
A description of the Neapolitan Horse was given in The Sportsman's Dictionary in 1800:

"This horse is highly esteemed for his strength and courage, which, together with his gentle dispositions, make him more valued.

His limbs are strong, and well knit together; his pace is lofty, and he is very docile for the performance of any exercise, but a nice eye may discover that his legs are something too small, which seems to be his only imperfection.

He may be known by his head, which is long, lean, and slender, bending from the eyes to the nostrils, like a hawk's beak; he also has a very full eye, and a sharp ear."

== History ==
Between the 16th and 19th centuries, Naples and the surrounding regions were known for their high-quality Neapolitan horses. The best horses were bred by nobles for transportation and cavalry. At the beginning of this time, the horses were likely small, coarse, and heavy, suitable for carrying heavily armored warriors. However, as elsewhere, the use of firearms brought on the desire for a more attractive, agile horse. This was achieved through selective breeding, but also through the use of horses from the Near and Middle East. The horses from these arid lands were, if not properly Arabian themselves, at least in type would have been very like Arabians, Barbs, and Akhal-Tekes.

Neapolitan breeders, it seems, regularly exchanged stock with those in Andalusia, which would have encouraged the Barb influence. The head was straight to convex in structure, but dry-featured. The body was deep and broad, but short-backed, with wide round hindquarters and a crested, powerful neck set on high.

Neapolitan horses are often mentioned in the history of European horse breeds. A modern breed considered similar to the ancient Neapolitan is one of its descendants, the Lipizzaner.

=== Timeline ===
1508 – Ferdinand of Spain joins the League of Cambrai, which returns Apulia to Spain, along with southern Italy, the port of Brindisi, and Sardinia, where he founds an Andalusian stud at Abbasanta. Several other Andalusian studs follow. Italian horses receive a heavy dose of Spanish blood.

1567 – 1,200 mares are selected for a project by Philip II of Spain to breed the "perfect" Spanish horse. They are crossed with Neapolitans, which had been heavily crossed with Andalusians during the time of Ferdinand.

1572 – The first foals of Philip II's project are born and he decides to save these animals for his own use and to present them as gifts to other royals. Highly colored, they are elegant, with an elevated gait, and capable of performing the difficult "Airs above the Ground."

1624 – Classical dressage is being taught in Italy. Neapolitan stallions perform the "Airs above the Ground" between pillars.

1767 – Conversano, a black Neapolitan stallion, is foaled, later to become a foundation sire for the Lipizzan breed.

1790 – Neapolitano, a brown stallion from the Po Region of Italy, is foaled. He is another foundation sire for the Lipizzan breed.

1819 – Maestoso is foaled in Hungary. He is half Spanish, half Neapolitan, and another foundation sire of the Lipizzan breed.

1950 – The Neapolitan is thought to have become extinct.

== Modern Recreation ==
A breed called the Napolitano exists in Italy today, and is recognized by the Italian government. According to Gouraud, "a dedicated breeder ... is hoping to be able to rebuild it". La Repubblica reports that the attempt is based on a single stallion, Neapolitano "Il Vecchio", which belonged as a foal to Marshal Tito and passed when old to a Serbian farmer, from whom it was purchased and imported to Italy in 1989.

The Napoletano as it is known today is one of the 15 indigenous horse "breeds of limited distribution" currently recognised by the AIA, the Italian breeders' association, under the terms of ministerial decree D.M. 24347 dated 5 November 2003; its status was listed in 2007 as critical by the Food and Agriculture Organization of the United Nations. In 2005, a total population of 20 mares and four stallions was registered.

The Napoletano is suitable for light or medium driving and as a saddle horse, but particularly for dressage and haute école.

=== Characteristics ===
According to the breed standard, the Napoletano may be bay, black, "burnt chestnut" or grey, and must stand at least 150 cm (14.3 hands) (59 in) at the withers. The head is "proud and square", the forehead broad, the eyes large, the profile straight becoming convex over the nose, the nostrils flattened, and the ears small. The neck is muscular, long and elegantly curved; the mane is thick and long. The shoulder is deep and well sloped, with high and well-pronounced withers. The croup is broad, rounded, and almost double, and the tail is thick and long, set on medium low. The legs are well-proportioned and very muscular, particularly behind, dry and with pronounced tendons, the joints broad and dry. The action is "elegant, pronounced and majestic", the temperament "lively, bold and generous."

=== Timeline ===
1989 – The stallion Neapolitano "Il Vecchio", which belonged as a foal to Marshal Tito is imported to Italy, with the hopes of rebuilding the Napolitano breed.

2003 – The Napoletano is recognised by the AIA under the terms of ministerial decree D.M. 24347

2005 – A total population of 20 mares and four stallions was registered.

2007 – The status of the Napoletano was listed in 2007 as critical by the Food and Agriculture Organization of the United Nations.

== See also ==
- Andalusian horse
