= Studbook selection =

Evaluation of horse for breed registry

Studbook selection is a process used in certain breeds of horses to select breeding stock. It allows a breed registry to direct the evolution of the breed towards the ideal by eliminating unhealthy or undesirable animals from the population. The removal of individuals from a population is called culling, and does not suggest killing the animal in question. Typically, culls are castrated or they and their offspring are unable to be registered.

Registries which implement studbook selection differ from registries which require only two parents of the proper pedigree or registration status. For example, a horse foal with two Thoroughbred parents is almost certainly a Thoroughbred, but a foal with two Oldenburg parents may not be accepted through studbook selection to be an Oldenburg.

The pattern of studbook selection varies from nation to nation and registry to registry, but among horse registries, particularly warmblood registries, the general outline includes an inspection of foals before formal registration, evaluation of conformation and movement of broodmares, and evaluation of the conformation, movement, health, and performance ability of stallions. Decisions about which mares and stallions are suitable breeding stock are made by elected breed judges, who strive for objectivity and transparency.

== Foal inspection ==
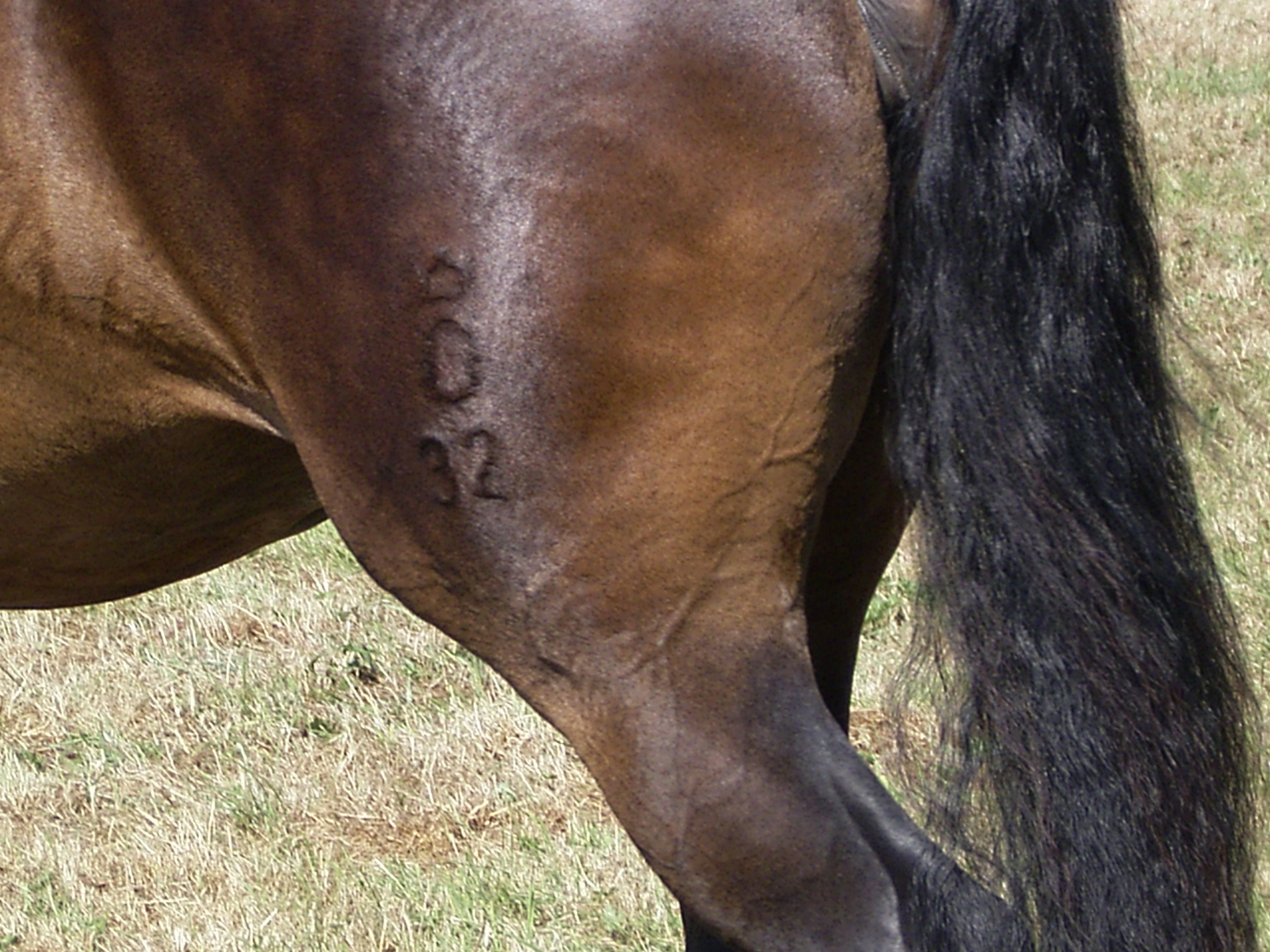
Oldenburg brand showing the last 2 digits of the UELN

Foals are usually presented at a local mare and foal show by their dam's side. If the foal's sire and dam are in the studbook, and he generally fits into the breeding goal, he receives his papers and a brand on the left thigh. The brand identifies his registry. Although foals are not usually scored, some registries award "Premium" status to high-quality foals, and colts may be deemed stallion prospects by the judge(s).

Foal inspections are also used to determine whether or not a stallion is producing offspring that fit the breeding goal.

== Studbook inspection ==
The first method of evaluating breeding stock in many warmblood registries is the studbook inspection. Fillies may be evaluated at age 3 at a local mare and foal show, and colts may be evaluated at age 2 at the Körung, which translates to "breed survey", "bonitation" or "licensing".

Typically there are prerequisites in terms of pedigree and height, which vary depending on the registry. Most registries would like to see colts at least 15.3 hands high at the withers, and fillies at least 15.2hh, with the expectation that they will grow a bit more.
Pedigree requirements also vary, and many studbooks expect to see only stallion sons of Main Mare Book mares. This encourages local breeders to keep high-quality mares in the region. Preferably, future breeding stock have at least 4 generations of approved sport horse pedigree. Mares with less pedigree, or less than is desirable to her registry, may be entered into a "Pre-Mare Book", though she generally cannot produce stallion sons. What constitutes "approved" also depends on the registry.

Most studbook inspections follow a similar outline. The horse is judged on their conformation from each side, and then led to and away the judge(s) at the walk and trot on a hard surface to show the gaits. To evaluate the canter, horses are turned loose in an enclosed area one at a time. To evaluate jumping ability, the horse is sent down a chute over fences without a rider ("free jumping").

Horses are scored from 1 to 10 on a variety of traits, which may include any of the following: type, conformation, gaits, jumping, and overall impression.

=== Type ===
Type is a subjective quality, divided into "breed type" and "sex type." A horse with high sex type exhibits strong secondary sex characteristics; in other words, feminine mares and masculine stallions. Breed type varies widely between registries, but essentially refers to the attractiveness of the horse and its suitability for sport. This aesthetic is an important part of breeding marketable horses, though registries and their judges tend to be conscious of the danger of overweighing beauty.

=== Conformation ===
Standards of conformation do not vary as significantly for horses as they do for dogs, as a horse's conformation is extremely important to its ability to perform and stay sound doing so. Generally, all horses are ideally divisible into three equal parts: forehand, trunk, hindquarters. This is called "harmony" and has that effect on the eye. Another quality generally agreed upon is that from the front and rear, all four legs should be straight. Beyond that, uphill build, high-set neck, a mobile head-neck connection and long legs are more important in dressage horses than jumping horses. The musculature and outline of the back and loin, called the topline, is important to most registries, as are large joints and hooves with "dry" legs.

Conformation scores are usually broken down further to allow breeders to compare specific traits in horses - for instance the "forelimbs" and "hindlimbs" are almost always awarded separate scores.

=== Gaits ===
The walk, trot, and canter are the gaits needed for sport. All three are important for dressage, and the canter is especially important for jumping. In all three, a long stride and even rhythm are paramount. Most registries look for a diligent, marching walk in which the entire body is used. The trot and canter are ideally energetic with obvious suspension (moment in which the horse is totally airborne) and an elastic quality. The energy for all three gaits should come from the hind end.

Scores may be given for "walk", "trot" and "canter" individually, with a separate score for "correctness of gaits". Some registries do not ask to see the mare canter, though this is uncommon. The canter is, in some cases, weighted more heavily for jumping mares.

=== Jumping ===
The free jump can give insight into the jumping talent of a horse. At inspections, stallions in particular are judged on their ability to jump and their form. The best jumpers approach the jump confidently and alter their stride to find the correct take-off spot ("scope"), arc over the jump ("bascule") and draw their forelegs up out of the way. Horses that do not arc over the fence, knock down fences, lose their rhythm, dangle their legs or hold their heads high and stiff are not good jumpers.

All registries require stallions to free jump to pass the studbook inspection, though usually dressage-oriented stallions are not asked to jump as high. Mares may not jump at all, or may only be asked to jump if they are from jumping-oriented families.

=== Overall impression ===
The category for "overall impression" gives the judge(s) a place to comment on other qualities. Obvious behavioral tendencies or personality traits may be noted here, as is the physical maturity of the horse.

=== Results ===
Most registries require that a stallion earn an average 7.0 with no score below 5.0 to be licensed. Mares who do not earn a sufficient score (usually average 6.0 none below 5.0) are usually entered into the Pre-Mare Book.

== Health examinations ==
Almost all studbooks have some type of health requirement for stallions seeking approval. The veterinary exam may occur before, during, or after the Körung, and always rules out stallions with congenital defects of the genitalia or dentition. Stallions may also undergo radiographs to screen against OCD, laryngoscopies to screen against airway obstructions, and semen analysis to ensure fertility. Stallions which have had surgeries or other treatments to correct a congenital defect are not allowed to breed. Based on the registry, stallions may have to be free of cribbing, recurrent airway obstruction ("heaves"), equine recurrent uveitis ("moon blindness"), laryngeal hemiplegia ("roaring"), glanders, etc.

== Performance tests ==
Performance tests take place when the breeding horses are old enough to be ridden, and are designed to give the registry detailed, objective information on the actual performance ability of the horses. It is mandatory for a stallion to prove himself in sport, and mares complete performance requirements to earn awards.

Mare performance tests (German: Stutenleistungsprüfung) are often open to geldings, as well. By comparing mother-daughter scores, patterns in the traits that stallions pass on can be calculated. A performance test for mares or geldings is either a one-day "Field Test" or 2- to 5-week "Station Test".

A stallion performance test (German: Hengsteigenleistungsprüfung) is either a 30-day "suitability test", or a "station test" lasting 70, 100, or even 300 days. Today, only young stallions owned by the State Stud of Celle attend the 300-Day Test. The suitability test must be combined with a performance record in order to fulfill a stallion's performance requirement.

=== Field test ===
The field test lasts only one day and is designed for mares and geldings with some education under saddle. In a field test, the horse is scored on the basic gaits, free jumping ability, and rideability. A guest rider is also used.

=== Station test ===
The station test is attended by young horses, held separately for stallions, is made up of an initial training period and a final test. The training environment, usually held at one of the state-owned stud farms, is standardized to increase the reliability of the results. Before the final test, the training director scores the horses on a number of traits. The final test is run by visiting experts and guest riders, who also score the horses. The results of the station test provide insight into the physical ability and the interior qualities that make a riding horse a good partner. Horses attending a station test are evaluated on the following:

==== Interior qualities ====
The scores for the "inner" qualities are given by the training director, who depends on the input of the horse's riders and handlers. The interior qualities include character, temperament, constitution, and willingness. A horse with a good character is affable and people-oriented, and does not display defensive reactions such as ear-pinning during grooming, saddling, or everyday handling. A horse with a good temperament is balanced, attentive, responsive, sensitive with a desire to please. A horse with a good constitution is resilient physically and psychologically, not succumbing to pressure, and is healthy with a lot of stamina. A willing horse is courageous, curious, trainable and does not balk from being asked to work.

==== Gaits ====
The basic gaits are evaluated under saddle both during the training period and by the guest experts. The regulations require that the movements be as natural as possible. A good walk is flat-footed with a regular 4-beat rhythm, diligent with long stride. A poor walk is arhythmical, pacey or short-strided. A good trot and canter are rhythmical and never disconnected. The stride is long, the horse swings through a relaxed topline. The trot and canter are elastic and give the impression that the horse is pushing from the rear. In particular, the canter must have a distinct uphill tendency. Short or choppy canter strides are not desirable.

==== Jumping ====
Jumping is scored a number of different ways. The training director scores his or her general impression of the horse's aptitude, and the experts evaluate the horse while jumping with and without a rider. A good jumper never loses the rhythm of his canter. He approaches the jump in balance, arcs over the fence (bascule), draws both the front and rear legs out of the way, and adapts his stride to the space between the jumps (scope).

==== Rideability ====
Rideability is scored by both the training director and the guest riders, and is of paramount importance. A highly rideable horse is comfortable and uncomplicated to ride, and does not require the rider to hold him or her up (self-carriage). The horse is balanced, attentive, intelligent and obedient.

==== Cross country ====
The cross-country test serves to test the stallion's stamina, though he is also judged on his canter and jumping during this part of the final test. His recovery time and heart rate are taken as part of the veterinary examination.

=== Results ===
The 70-Day, 100-Day and 300-Day tests fulfill a stallion's performance requirements, and both the station and field tests satisfy a mare or gelding's. A stallion that attends the suitability test must perform at an age-appropriate level in open competition to complete his requirements. A mare or stallion may also fulfill these requirements with performance at a higher level of competition. Most registries prefer to see show results in dressage and show jumping, though eventing and combined driving are sometimes permitted. Some North American branches of sport horse registries even accept show results in show hunters.

Registries may have further requirements for stallions to retain their approval for breeding. Most will disapprove a stallion whose offspring do not fit the breeding aim.

== Awards ==
In the past, registries offered breeders a monetary prize or "premium" for exceptional mares. The condition of accepting the prize was that the mare couldn't be exported, a method of ensuring that high-quality mare lines were not lost. Today, mares can earn the "States Premium" award by receiving above-average scores on her studbook inspection and completing the performance requirements. Such a mare is recognized by the prefix "St.Pr.St." or "SPS" before her name. Mares who complete these requirements but don't fit the pedigree regulations can earn the "Verbands Premium" or "Registry Premium", which has the prefix "V.Pr.St.". A stallion may also earn a premium.
