= Black horse =

Horse coat color

Black
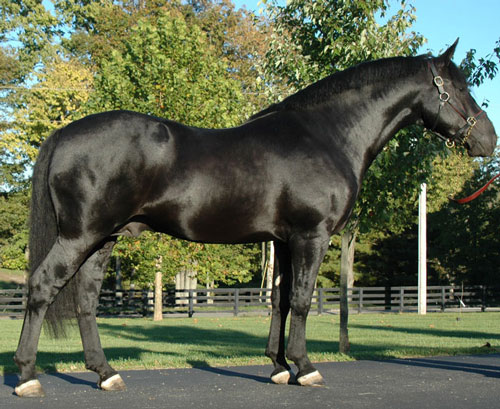
- Black Irish Draught horse
- Variants: Fading, non-fading, possibly genetic

Genotype
- Base color: Extension "E"
- Modifying genes: none
- Description: Solid black base color uniform over entire body other than markings
- Skin: Black
- Eyes: Brown

Black is a hair coat color of horses in which the entire hair coat is black. It is not uncommon to mistake dark chestnuts or bays for black.

Black horses have dark brown eyes, black skin, and wholly black hair coats without any areas of permanently reddish or brownish hair. They may have pink skin beneath any white markings under the areas of white hair, and if such white markings include one or both eyes, the eyes may be blue. Many black horses "sun bleach" with exposure to the elements and sweat, and therefore their coats may lose some of their rich black character and may even resemble bay or seal brown, though examination of the color of hair around the eyes, muzzle and genitals will determine color.

Some breeds of horses, such as the Friesian horse, Murgese and Ariegeois (or Merens), are almost exclusively black, whilst the Menorquín can only be black. Black is also common in the Fell pony, Dales pony, Ostfriesen and Alt-Oldenburger, Kladruber, and Groningen.

== Visual identification ==
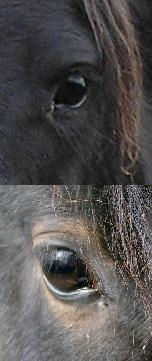
Black horse (top) with sun bleached mane compared against dark bay or seal brown horse (bottom) with reddish hairs around the eye.

When identifying the base color of a horse, it is important to disregard all pink-skinned white markings. White markings and patterns such as pinto and leopard have no bearing on the underlying base coat color of the animal.

Black foals are typically born a mousey gray but can be darker shades. As many foals have primitive markings at birth, some black foals are mistaken for grullo or even bay dun; the primitive markings on a black foal will, however, disappear as the black hair coat grows in. Black foals have dark skin and eyes at birth. An adult-like black foal coat often indicates that the foal will gray, if the foal has at least one gray parent. Graying can be confirmed by the presence of white hairs around the eyes and muzzle. Gray Lipizzaner horses are frequently born black.

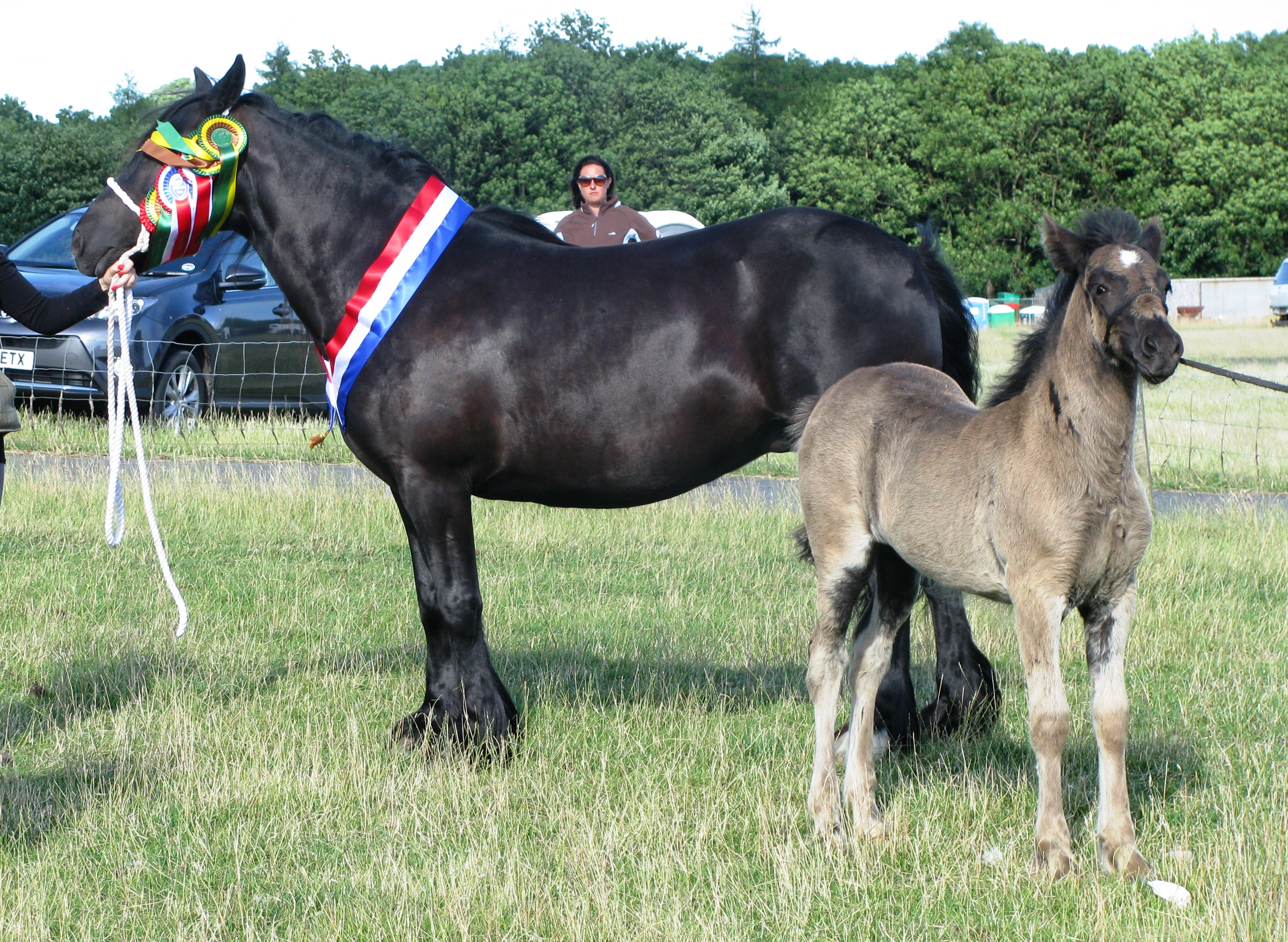
As seen in this photo, black foals are often born a "mousy" color that sheds off as they get older

Black adult horses are easier to identify, as the coat must be entirely black, even if superficially sun bleached. A sun bleached black may be confused with a dark bay, but a trained eye can distinguish between them, particularly by examining the fine hairs around the eyes and muzzle. When a black horse is sun-bleached, the mane and tail often sun bleach most prominently, and the rest of the coat may have a rusty tinge. A sun-bleached black may also be mistaken as being smoky black, however their phenotypes overlap so there is no reliable way to identify them visually; some smoky black horses are solid black, and some regular black horses are heavily sun bleached.

== Black mimics ==
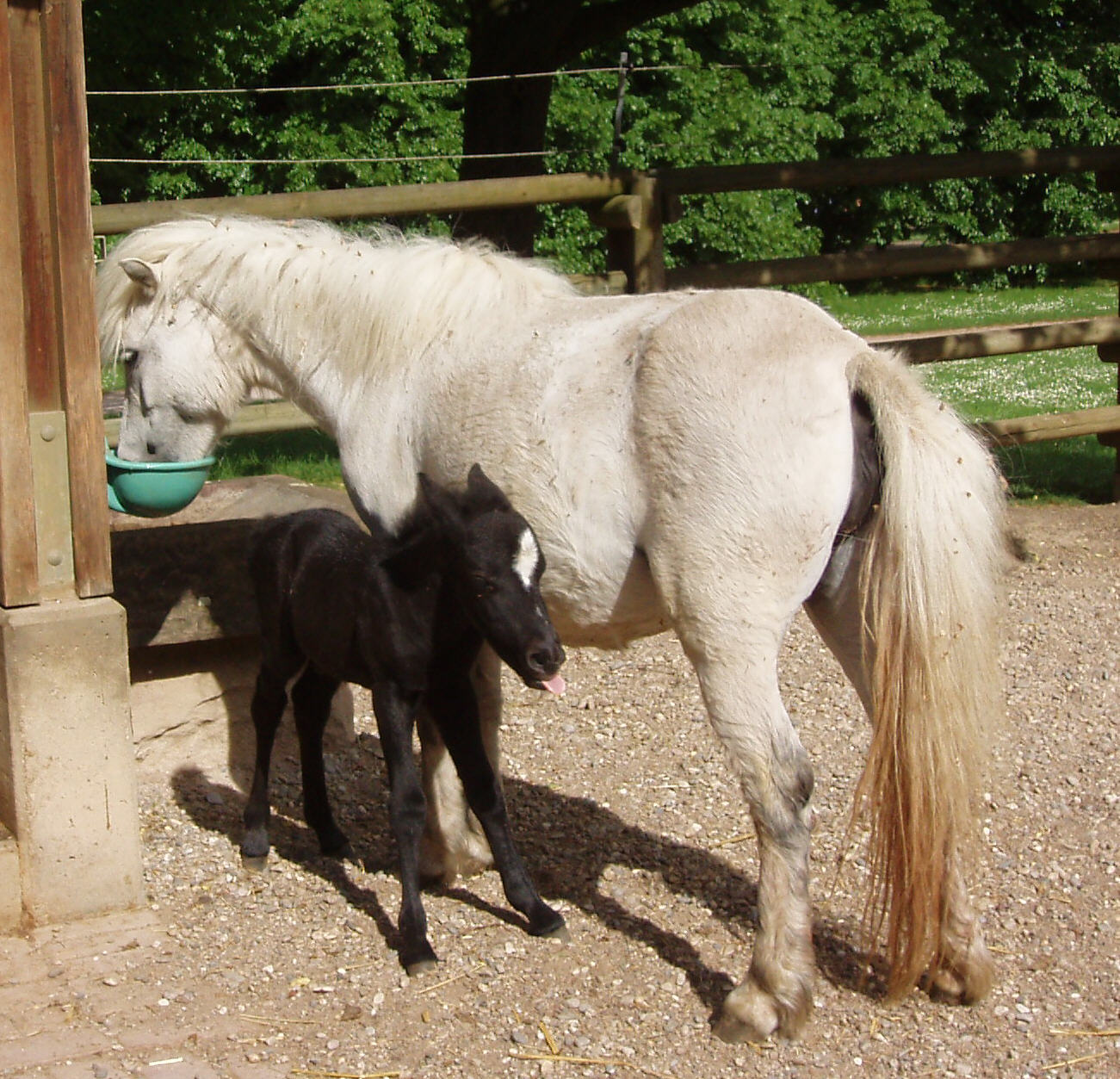
This black Shetland Pony foal was born very dark and will likely gray like its mother

- Dark bay or seal brown: The darkest shades of bay are commonly confused with black, even by experienced horse persons. However, a dark bay will always show some rich red character in its coat. Horses with a very dark coat that may appear black, but have tan or reddish hairs around the eyes, muzzle, armpits, and stifle are sometimes called "seal brown", "mahogany bay", or "black bay." Both colors are genetically distinct from black and can be confirmed with a DNA test.
- Liver chestnut: Some red horses are so dark that they appear black, and are often called "black chestnuts" as a consequence. However, even the darkest liver chestnuts will show some red character in their coats, usually in the hair around the pastern or in the mane or tail. Even dark liver chestnuts do not have any true black pigment in their coats. This can be verified with DNA testing. Liver chestnut is very common in the Morgan horse.
- Smoky black: The action of the cream gene in the heterozygous condition has a minimal effect on black pigment, so heterozygous creams with a black base coat (smoky blacks) differ little from true blacks. A smoky black will have at least one cream parent, is often born a pewter shade with blue eyes, and usually retains reddish hair inside the ear through adulthood.

== Genetic identification ==
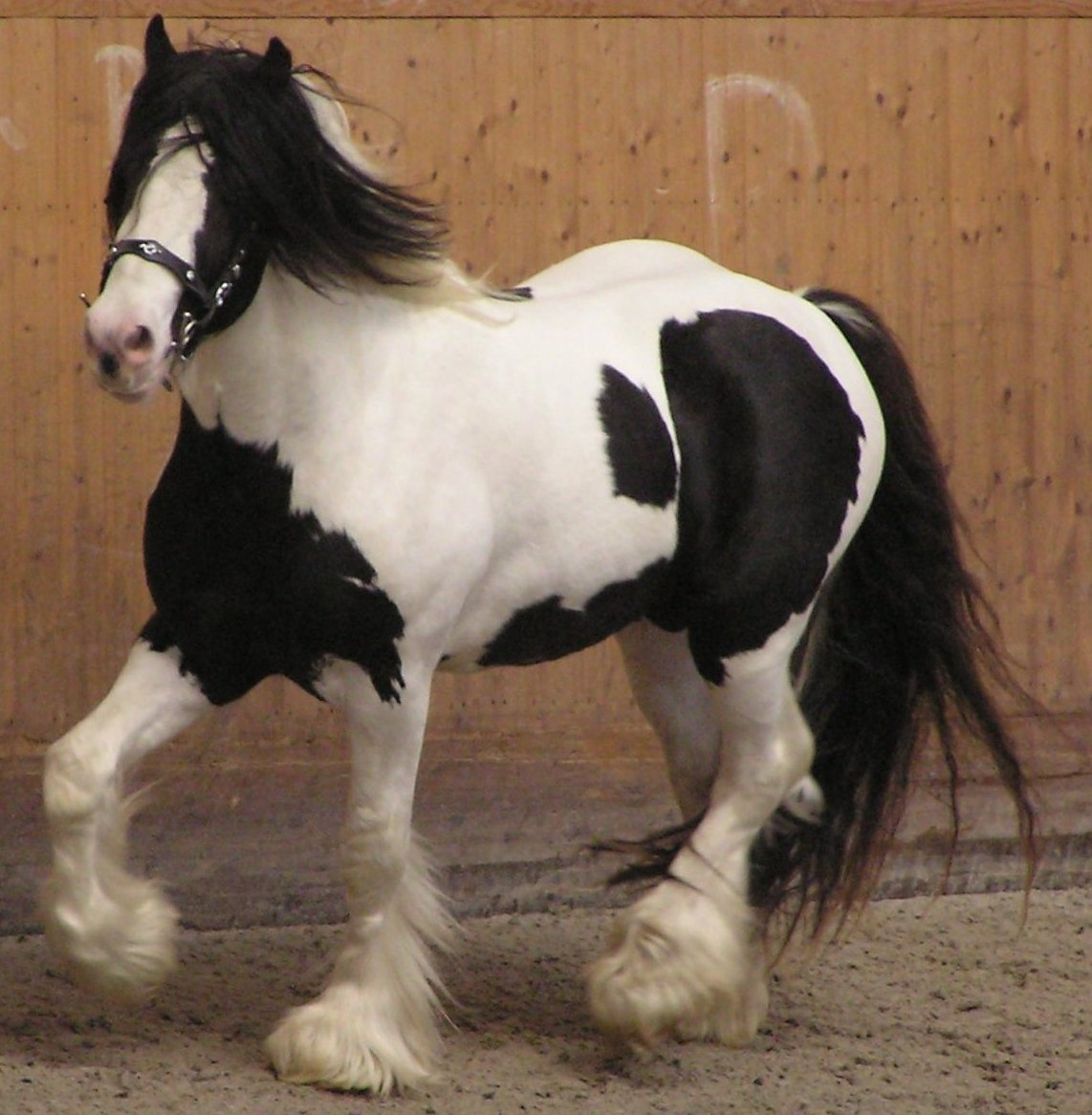
A horse with a black base coat overlain by tobiano-patterned white markings, called a piebald in some countries.

In the study and discussion of equine coat color genetics, black is considered a "base" color, as is red. This designation makes the effects of other coat color genes easier to understand. Coat colors that are designated "black-based" include grullo (also called blue dun), smoky black, smoky cream, silver black, classic champagne, and blue roan. Sometimes this designation includes the bay family: bay, seal brown, buckskin, bay dun, silver bay, perlino, amber champagne, and bay roan. Horses with a black-based coat may also have added spotting patterns including leopard patterns seen on Appaloosas and the pinto coloring known as piebald.

The genetics behind the black horse are relatively simple. The color black is primarily controlled by two genes: Extension and Agouti. The functional, dominant allele of the extension gene (labeled "E") enables the horse to produce black pigment in the hair. Without this gene (homozygous recessive condition "ee"), the coat is devoid of black pigment and the horse is some shade of red. The functional, dominant allele (or alleles) of the agouti gene (labeled "A") enable the horse to restrict black pigment to certain parts of the coat, notably the legs, mane and tail, allowing the underlying red to show through, resulting in bay coloring. Without this gene (homozygous recessive condition "aa"), any black pigment present is unrestricted, resulting in a uniformly black coat.

Thus a black horse has at least one copy of the functional, dominant "E" allele and two copies of the non-functional, recessive "a" allele. A mature true black horse can be safely said to possess at least one dominant extension gene (EE or Ee); and has no other dominant genes (such as agouti, gray, or any of the dilution factors) that further modify color.

A DNA test, which uses hair with the root intact, has been developed to test for the Extension and Agouti genotypes. However, the terminology can be manipulated. Unfortunately, the extension test is often mislabeled as the "black test", leading to confusion. Neither the extension test nor the agouti test alone can identify a black horse. Together, they can determine that a horse that appears visually black is not actually a dark bay or liver chestnut.

Horses described as "homozygous black" are simply homozygous for the dominant extension gene (EE); they are homozygous "not-red". Such horses are only "guaranteed" to never produce a red foal. The actual horse may carry additional genetic modifiers that could make it bay, buckskin, gray, bay roan, perlino, silver bay, and so on. A visually black horse that is tested "homozygous black" is EE and has no other color modifiers.

However, it has become popular for individuals owning a horse that is homozygous for the extension gene (EE) to claim that the horse will "throw black." But, generally speaking, one horse cannot be guaranteed to "throw black" with all mates. The mate of a true black horse may contribute the a dominant Agouti allele, which will suppress the black coloring and result in a bay foal. If a black is bred to a gray, the ensuing foal may also be gray. Other modifiers present in the mate may produce additional dilution colors or spotting patterns. Nonetheless, certain individual pairings with appropriate DNA testing can, in some cases, be guaranteed to produce black.
