= Warlander =

Horse breed

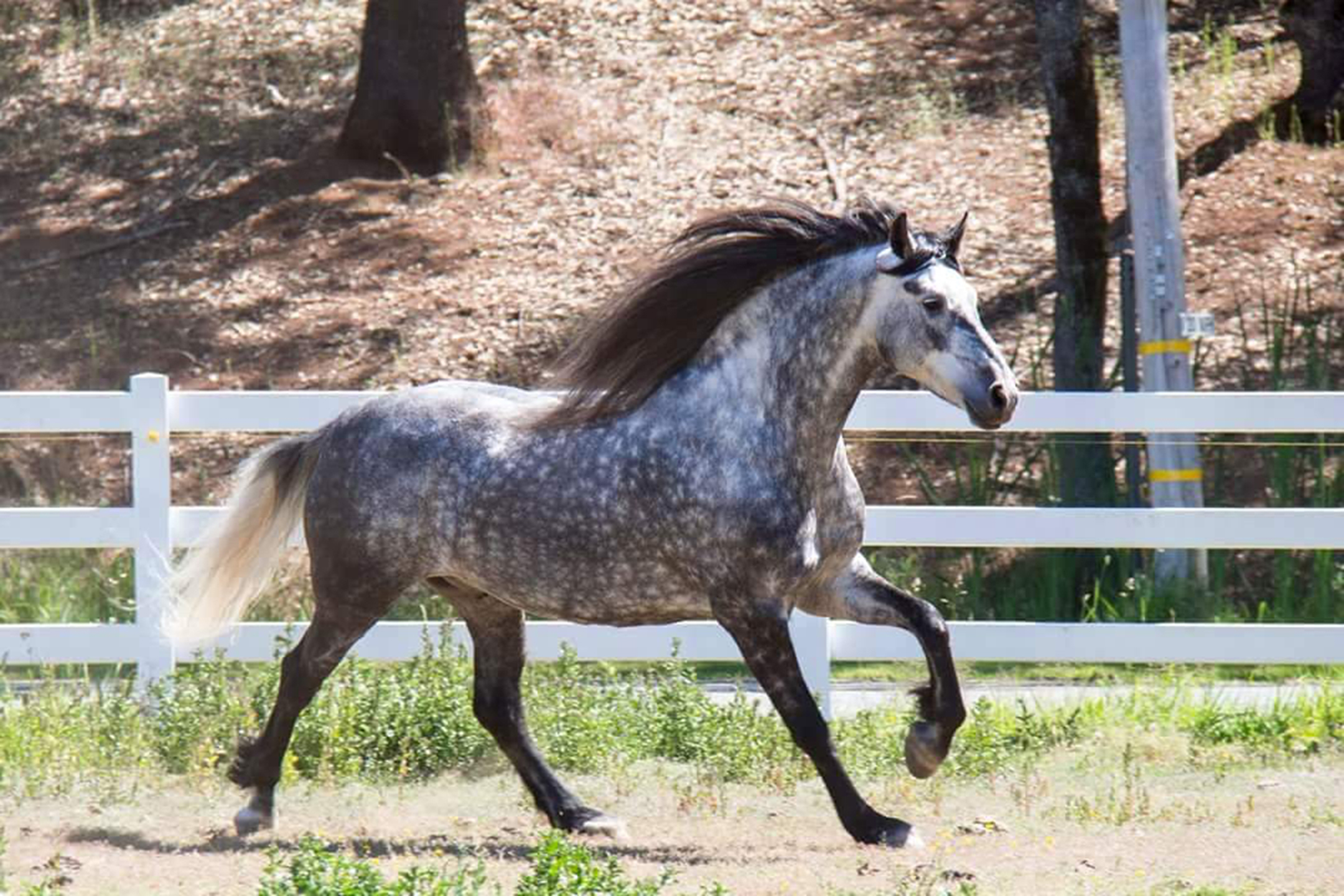
- Other names: Andalusian-Friesian
- Standard: BZVKS (in German)

The Warlander is a crossbreed produced by crossing Friesian horses with horses of a purebred registered Iberian horse breed such as the Andalusian, Lusitano, or Menorquín.

== History ==
For much of the sixteenth century, the Low Countries were under Spanish rule; Iberian horses brought there from Spain may have influenced the development of local horse types including the Friesian.

The Classical Sporthorse Stud in Western Australia named the breed after their association with veterinarian Warwick Vale in the late twentieth century.

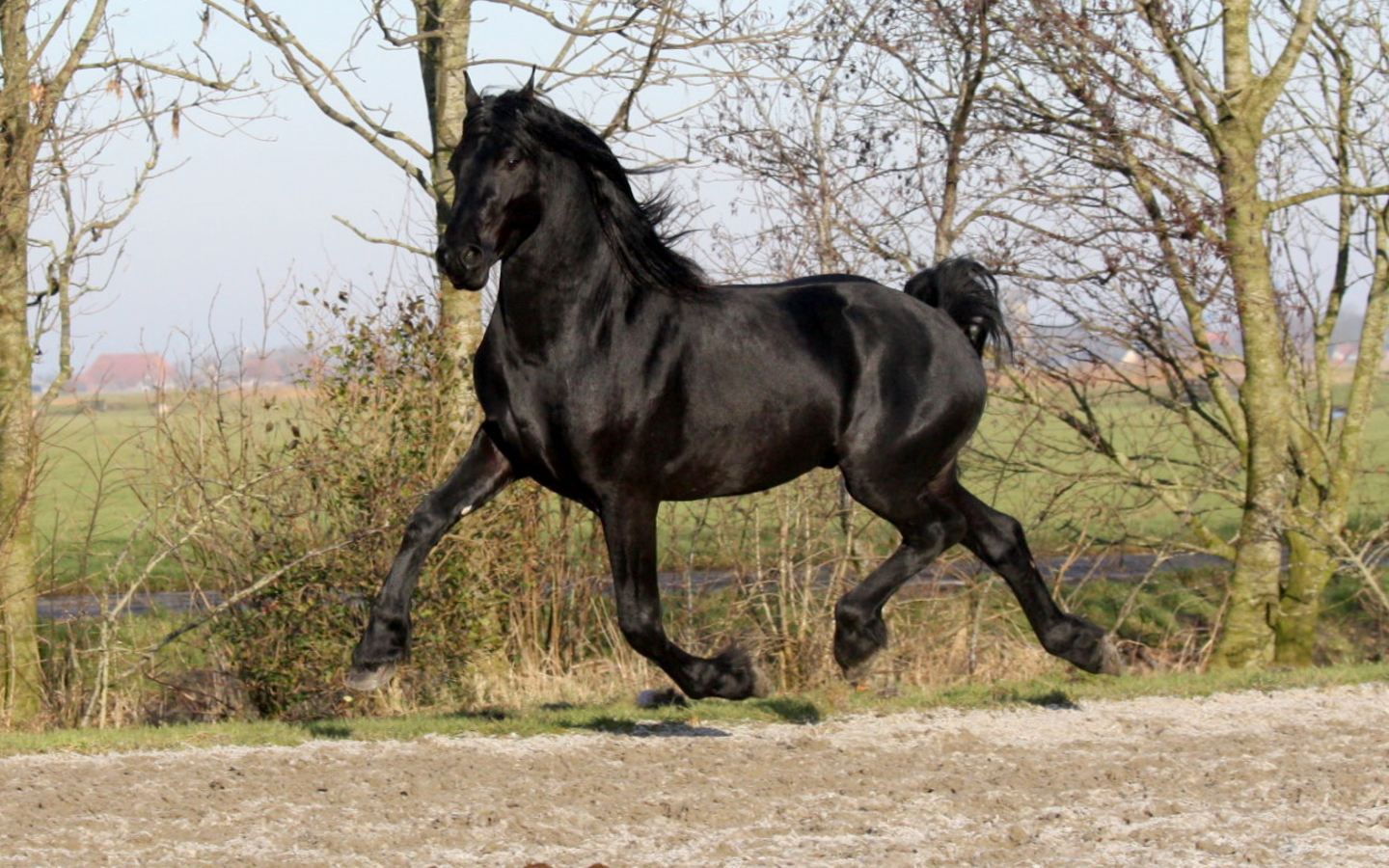

The Warlander is not listed by the Universal Equine Life Number foundation. A bred standard is published by the Bayerischer Zuchtverband für Kleinpferde und Spezialpferderassen, which has a UELN number.

== Characteristics ==
Significant debate exists over whether a Warlander will only obtain genetic benefit if it is an F1 hybrid. A crossbred animal is likely to enjoy hybrid vigor and therefore have genetic gains over both of its parents. However, there is uncertainty over whether an F2 horse - produced by a Warlander-Warlander, Warlander-Andalusian, or Warlander-Friesian pairing - would be likely to suffer from genetic atavism. The statistically tiny number of F2 and subsequent generation Warlander horses bred internationally has meant empirical resolution of this question has not yet been possible. The Warlander Studbook Society acknowledges that the following genetic defects are known to come from the base breeds of the Warlander and WSS breeders must notify the society if any horses show the following - Cryptorchidism, Monorchidism, Dwarfism, Fallen Crest, Water head/crown head foals (hydrocephalus) and Mesocolic Rente.
