= Andalusian horse =

Horse breed from the Iberian Peninsula

Andalusian
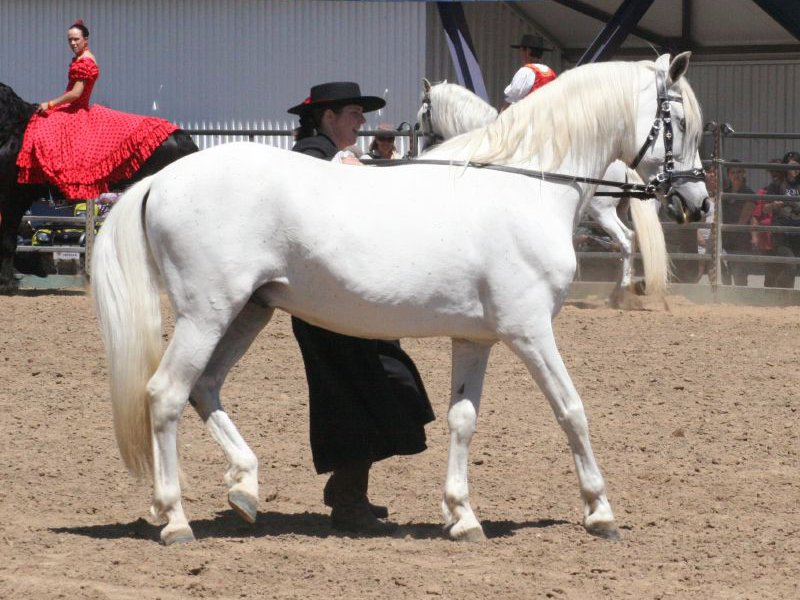

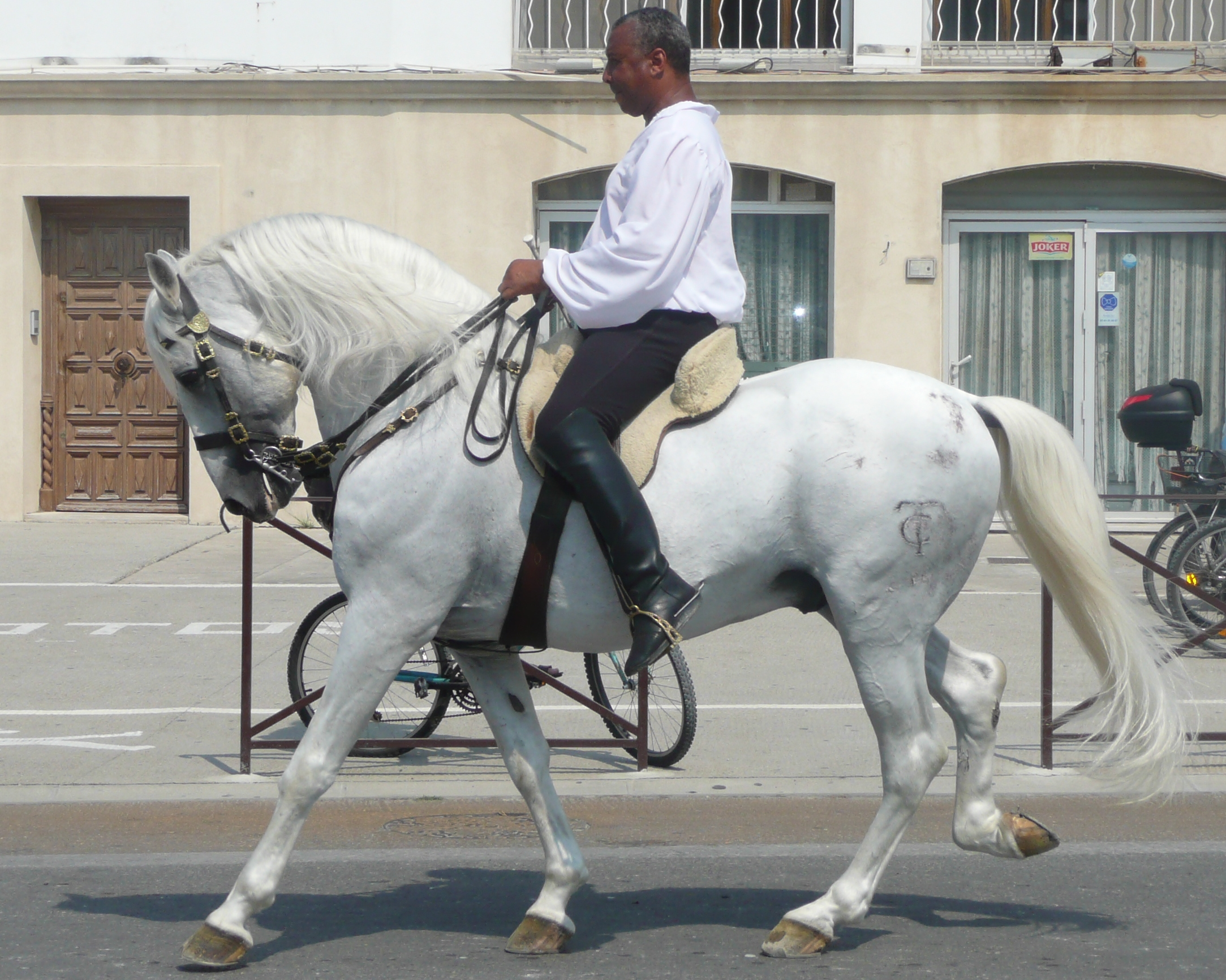
- Other names: Pura Raza Española; Pure Spanish Horse
- Country of origin: Spain
- Distribution: Throughout Spain; more than 65 other countries
- Standard: IALHA; Australasia Andalusian Association
- Use: Riding horse; Dressage (alta escuela or classical); Doma vaquera; Rejoneo; Acoso y derribo; Harness horse; Stock horse; Other equestrian sports

Traits
- Height: Male: Minimum 1.52 m (60 in); Female: Minimum 1.50 m (59 in)
- Distinguishing features: Strongly built, compact, elegant, thick mane and tail

The Andalusian, also known as the Pure Spanish Horse (Pura Raza Española, abbreviated PRE), is a Spanish breed of riding horse from the Iberian Peninsula, where its ancestors have lived for thousands of years. The Andalusian has been recognized as a distinct breed since the 15th century, and its conformation has changed very little over the centuries.

Throughout its history, it has been known for its prowess as a war horse, and was prized by the nobility. The breed was used as a tool of diplomacy by the Spanish government, and kings across Europe rode and owned Spanish horses. During the 19th century, warfare, disease, and crossbreeding reduced herd numbers dramatically, and despite some recovery in the late 19th century, the trend continued into the early 20th century. Exports of Andalusians from Spain were restricted until the 1960s, but the breed has since spread throughout the world, despite its low population. In 2010, more than 185,000 registered Andalusians existed worldwide.

Strongly built, and compact yet elegant, Andalusians have long, thick manes and tails. Their most common coat color is gray, although they can be found in many other colors. They are known for their intelligence, sensitivity, and docility. A sub-strain within the breed known as the Carthusian is considered by breeders to be the purest strain of Andalusian, though no genetic evidence for this claim is known. The strain is still considered separate from the main breed and is preferred by breeders because buyers pay more for horses of Carthusian bloodlines.

Several competing registries are keeping records of horses designated as Andalusian or PRE, but they differ on their definition of the Andalusian and PRE, the purity of various strains of the breed, and the legalities of stud book ownership. At least one lawsuit was in progress as of 2011 to determine the ownership of the Spanish PRE stud book.

The Andalusian is closely related to the Lusitano of Portugal, and has been used to develop many other breeds, especially in Europe and the Americas. Breeds with Andalusian ancestry include many of the warmbloods in Europe, as well as Western Hemisphere breeds such as the Azteca.

Over its centuries of development, the Andalusian breed has been selected for athleticism and stamina. The horses were originally used for classical dressage, driving, bullfighting, and working livestock. Modern Andalusians are used for many equestrian activities, including dressage, show jumping, and driving. The breed is also used extensively in movies, especially historical pictures and fantasy epics.

== Characteristics ==
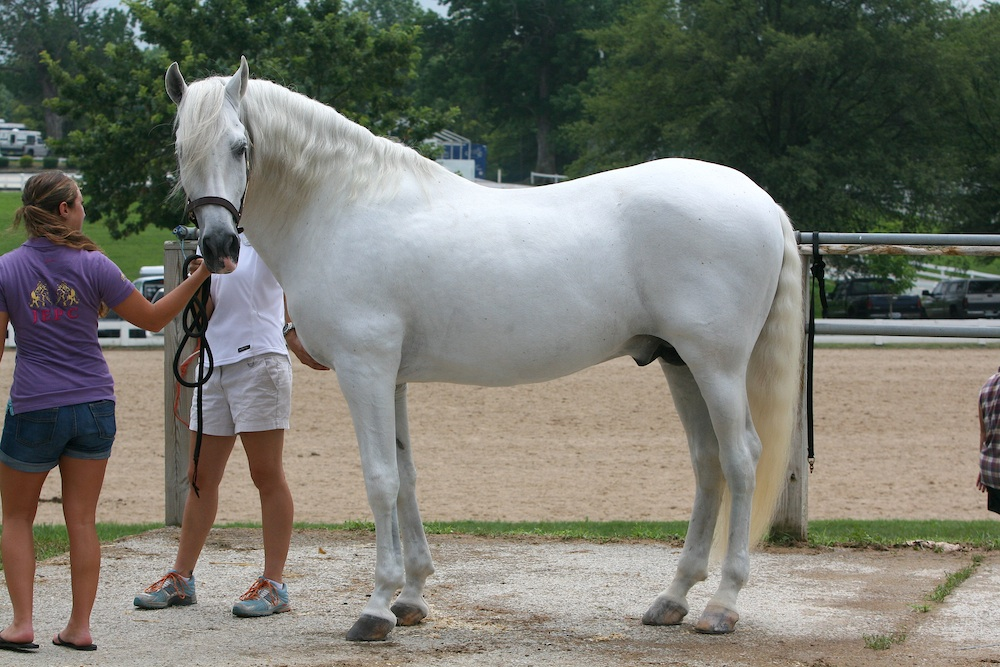
An Andalusian stallion

Andalusians average 15.1^{1}/_{2} hands (61.5 inches, 156 cm) at the withers; stallions and geldings are typically 512 kilograms (1,129 lb) in weight, while mares average 412 kilograms (908 lb). The Spanish government has set the minimum height for registration in Spain at 15.0 hands (60 inches, 152 cm) for males and 14.3 hands (59 inches, 150 cm) for mares; this standard is followed by the Association of Purebred Spanish Horse Breeders of Spain (Asociación Nacional de Criadores de Caballo de Pura Raza Española) and the Andalusian Horse Association of Australasia. The Spanish legislation also requires that for animals to be approved as either "qualified" or "élite" breeding stock, stallions must stand at least 15.1 hands (61 inches, 155 cm) and mares at least 15^{1}/_{4} hands (60.25 inches, 153 cm).

Andalusian horses are elegant and strongly built with a straight or slightly convex profile. Ultra convex and concave profiles are discouraged in the breed and are penalized in breed shows. Necks are long and broad, running to well-defined withers and a massive chest. They have a short back and broad, strong hindquarters with a well-rounded croup. The breed tends to have clean legs, with no propensity for blemishes or injuries, and energetic gaits. The mane and tail are thick and long, but the legs do not have excess feathering. Andalusians tend to be docile, while remaining intelligent and sensitive. When treated with respect, they are quick to learn, responsive, and cooperative.

Two additional characteristics are unique to the Carthusian strain, believed to trace back to the strain's foundation stallion Esclavo. The first is warts under the tail, a trait that Esclavo passed to his offspring and which some breeders felt was necessary to prove that a horse was a member of the Esclavo bloodline. The second characteristic is the occasional presence of "horns", which are frontal bosses, possibly inherited from Asian ancestors. The physical descriptions of the bosses vary, ranging from calcium-like deposits at the temple to small, horn-like protuberances near or behind the ear, but these "horns" are not considered proof of Esclavo descent, unlike the tail warts.

In the past, most coat colors were found, including spotted patterns. Today, most Andalusians are gray or bay; in the US, around 80% of all Andalusians are gray. Of the remaining horses, around 15% are bay and 5% are black, dun, palomino, or chestnut. Other colors, such as buckskin, pearl, and cremello, are rare, but are recognized as allowed colors by registries for the breed.

In the early history of the breed, certain white markings and whorls were considered to be indicators of character and good or bad luck. Horses with white socks on their feet were considered to have good or bad luck, depending on the leg or legs marked. A horse with no white markings at all was considered to be ill-tempered and vice-ridden, while certain facial markings were considered representative of honesty, loyalty, and endurance. Similarly, hair whorls in various places were considered to show good or bad luck, with the most unlucky being in places where the horse could not see them – for example the temples, cheek, shoulder, or heart. Two whorls near the root of the tail were considered a sign of courage and good luck.

The movement of Andalusian horses is extended, elevated, cadenced, and harmonious, with a balance of roundness and forward movement. Poor elevation, irregular tempo, and excessive winging (sideways movement of the legs from the knee down) are discouraged by breed registry standards. Andalusians are known for their agility and their ability to learn difficult moves quickly, such as advanced collection and turns on the haunches. A 2001 study compared the kinematic characteristics of Andalusian, Arabian, and Anglo-Arabian horses while moving at the trot. Andalusians were found to overtrack less (the degree to which the hind foot lands ahead of the front hoof print), but also exhibit greater flexing of both fore and hind joints, movement consistent with the more elevated way of going typically found in this breed. The authors of the study theorized that these characteristics of the breed's trot may contribute to their success as a riding and dressage horse.

A 2008 study found that Andalusians experience ischaemic (reduced blood flow) diseases of the small intestine at a rate significantly higher than other breeds; stallions had higher numbers of inguinal hernias, with risk for occurrence 30 times greater than other breeds. At the same time, they also showed a lower incidence of large intestinal obstruction. In the course of the study, Andalusians also showed the highest risk of laminitis as a medical complication related to the intestinal issues.

== Breed history ==
=== Early development ===
... the noblest horse in the world, the most beautiful that can be. He is of great spirit and of great courage and docile; hath the proudest trot and the best action in his trot, the loftiest gallop, and is the lovingest and gentlest horse, and fittest of all for a king in his day of triumph.

— William Cavendish, the Duke of Newcastle, 1667

The Andalusian horse is descended from the Iberian horses of Spain and Portugal, and derives its name from its place of origin, the Spanish region of Andalusia. Cave paintings show that horses have been present on the Iberian Peninsula as far back as 20,000 to 30,000 BCE. Although Portuguese historian Ruy d'Andrade hypothesized that the ancient Sorraia breed was an ancestor of the Southern Iberian breeds, including the Andalusian, genetic studies using mitochondrial DNA show that the Sorraia is part of a genetic cluster that is largely separated from most Iberian breeds.

Throughout history, the Iberian breeds have been influenced by many different peoples and cultures who occupied Spain, including the Celts, Carthaginians, Romans, various Germanic tribes, and Arabs. The Iberian horse was identified as a talented warhorse as early as 450 BCE. Mitochondrial DNA studies of the modern Andalusian horse of the Iberian Peninsula and Barb horse of North Africa present convincing evidence that both breeds crossed the Strait of Gibraltar and were used for breeding with each other, influencing one another's bloodlines. Thus, the Andalusian may have been the first European "warmblood", a mixture of heavy European and lighter Oriental horses. Some of the earliest written pedigrees in recorded European history were kept by Carthusian monks, beginning in the 13th century. Because they could read and write, thus were able to maintain careful records, monastics were given the responsibility for horse breeding by certain members of the nobility, particularly in Spain. Andalusian stud farms for breeding were formed in the late 15th century in Carthusian monasteries in Jerez, Seville, and Cazalla.

The Carthusians bred powerful, weight-bearing horses in Andalusia for the Crown of Castile, using the finest Spanish Jennets as foundation bloodstock. These horses were a blend of Jennet and warmblood breeding, taller and more powerfully built than the original Jennet. By the 15th century, the Andalusian had become a distinct breed, and was being used to influence the development of other breeds. They were also noted for their use as cavalry horses. Though in the 16th and 17th centuries, Spanish horses had not reached the final form of the modern Andalusian, by 1667 William Cavendish, the Duke of Newcastle, called the Spanish horse of Andalusia the "princes" of the horse world, and reported that they were "unnervingly intelligent". The Iberian horse became known as the "royal horse of Europe" and was seen at many royal courts and riding academies, including those in Austria, Italy, France, and Germany. By the 16th century, during the reigns of Charles V (1500–1558) and Phillip II (1556–1581), Spanish horses were considered the finest in the world. Even in Spain, quality horses were owned mainly by the wealthy. During the 16th century, inflation and an increased demand for harness and cavalry horses drove the price of horses extremely high. The always-expensive Andalusian became even more so, and finding a member of the breed to purchase at any price was often impossible.

=== Dissemination ===
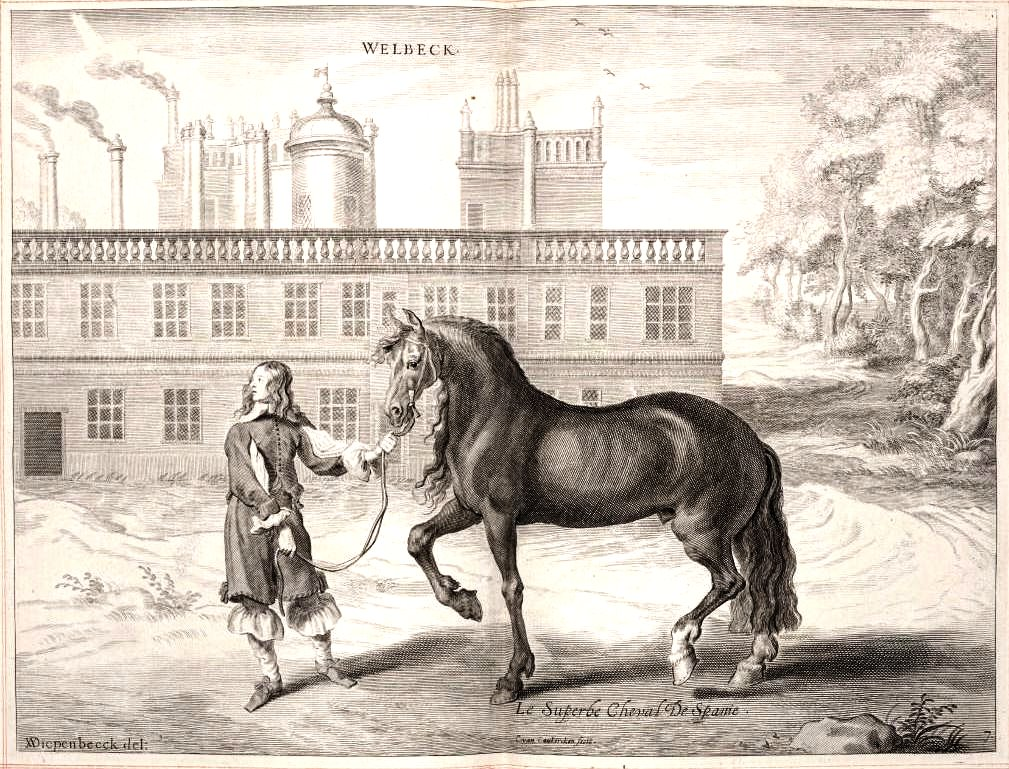
A 1743 engraving of a "Spanish horse"

Spanish horses also were spread widely as a tool of diplomacy by the government of Spain, which granted both horses and export rights to favored citizens and other royalty. As early as the 15th century, the Spanish horse was widely distributed throughout the Mediterranean, and was known in Northern European countries, despite being less common and more expensive there. As time went on, kings from across Europe, including every French monarch from Francis I to Louis XVI, had equestrian portraits created showing themselves riding Spanish-type horses. The kings of France, including Louis XIII and Louis XIV, especially preferred the Spanish horse; the head groom to Henri IV, Salomon de la Broue, said in 1600, "Comparing the best horses, I give the Spanish horse first place for its perfection, because it is the most beautiful, noble, graceful and courageous". War horses from Spain and Portugal began to be introduced to England in the 12th century, and importation continued through the 15th century. In the 16th century, Henry VIII received gifts of Spanish horses from Charles V, Ferdinand II of Aragon and the Duke of Savoy and others when he wed Katherine of Aragon. He also purchased additional war and riding horses through agents in Spain. By 1576, Spanish horses made up one third of British royal studs at Malmesbury and Tutbury. The Spanish horse peaked in popularity in Great Britain during the 17th century, when horses were freely imported from Spain and exchanged as gifts between royal families. With the introduction of the Thoroughbred, interest in the Spanish horse faded after the mid-18th century, although they remained popular through the early 19th century. The conquistadores of the 16th century rode Spanish horses, particularly animals from Andalusia, and the modern Andalusian descended from similar bloodstock. By 1500, Spanish horses were established in studs on Santo Domingo, and Spanish horses made their way into the ancestry of many breeds founded in North and South America. Many Spanish explorers from the 16th century on brought Spanish horses with them for use as warhorses and later as breeding stock. By 1642, the Spanish horse had spread to Moldavia, to the stables of Transylvanian Prince George Rákóczi.

=== 19th century to present ===
Despite their ancient history, all living Andalusians trace to a small number of horses bred by religious orders in the 18th and 19th centuries. An influx of heavy horse blood, beginning in the 16th century, resulted in the dilution of many of the bloodlines; only those protected by selective breeding remained intact to become the modern Andalusian. During the 19th century, the Andalusian breed was threatened because many horses were stolen or requisitioned in wartime, including the War of the Oranges, the Peninsular War, and the three Carlist Wars. Napoleon's invading army also stole many horses. One herd of Andalusians was hidden from the invaders, however, and subsequently used to renew the breed. In 1822, breeders began to add Norman blood into Spanish bloodlines, as well as further infusions of Arabian blood. This was partially because increasing mechanization and changing needs within the military called for horses with more speed in cavalry charges, as well as horses with more bulk for pulling gun carriages. In 1832, an epidemic seriously affected Spain's horse population, from which only one small herd survived in a stud at the monastery in Cartuja. During the 19th and early 20th centuries, European breeders, especially the Germans, changed from an emphasis on Andalusian and Neapolitan horses (an emphasis that had been in place since the decline of chivalry), to an emphasis on the breeding of Thoroughbreds and warmbloods, further depleting the stock of Andalusians. Despite this change in focus, Andalusian breeding slowly recovered, and in 1869, the Seville Horse Fair (originally begun by the Romans), played host to between 10 and 12 thousand Spanish horses. In the early 20th century, Spanish horse breeding began to focus on other breeds, particularly draft breeds, Arabians, Thoroughbreds, and crosses between these breeds, as well as crosses between these breeds and the Andalusian. The purebred Andalusian was not viewed favorably by breeders or the military, and their numbers decreased significantly.

Andalusians only began to be exported from Spain in 1962. The first Andalusians were imported into Australia in 1971, and in 1973, the Andalusian Horse Association of Australasia was formed for the registration of these Andalusians and their offspring. Strict quarantine guidelines prohibited the importation of new Andalusian blood to Australia for many years, but since 1999, regulations have been relaxed and more than half a dozen new horses have been imported. Bloodlines in the United States also rely on imported stock, and all American Andalusians can be traced directly to the stud books in Portugal and Spain. Around 8,500 animals are in the United States, where the International Andalusian and Lusitano Horse Association (IALHA) registers around 700 new purebred foals every year. These numbers indicate that the Andalusian is a relatively rare breed in the United States. In 2003, 75,389 horses were registered in the stud book, and they constituted almost 66% of the horses in Spain. Breed numbers have been increasing during the 21st century. At the end of 2010, a total of 185,926 pura raza española horses was recorded in the database of the Spanish Ministerio de Medio Ambiente, y Medio Rural y Marino. Of these, 28,801 or about 15%, were in other countries of the world; of those in Spain, 65,371, or about 42%, were in Andalusia.

=== Strains and sub-types ===
The Carthusian Andalusian or Cartujano is generally considered the purest Andalusian strain and has one of the oldest recorded pedigree lines in the world. The pure subtype is rare, as only around 12% of the Andalusian horses registered between the founding of the stud book in the 19th century and 1998 were considered Carthusians. They made up only 3.6% of the overall breeding stock, but 14.2% of the stallions used for breeding. In the past, Carthusians were given preference in breeding, leading to a large proportion of the Andalusian population claiming ancestry from a small number of horses and possibly limiting the breed's genetic variability. A 2005 study compared the genetic distance between Carthusian and non-Carthusian horses. It found a fixation index (F_{ST}) based on genealogical information and concluded that the distinction between the two is not supported by genetic evidence. Slight physical differences exist, though; Carthusians have more "oriental" or concave head shapes and are more often gray in color, while non-Carthusians tend toward convex profiles and more often exhibit other coat colors such as bay.

The Carthusian line was established in the early 18th century when two Spanish brothers, Andrés and Diego Zamora, purchased a stallion named El Soldado and bred him to two mares. The mares were descended from mares purchased by the Spanish king and placed at Aranjuez, one of the oldest horse-breeding farms in Spain. One of the offspring of El Soldado, a dark gray colt named Esclavo, became the foundation sire of the Carthusian line. One group of mares sired by Esclavo around 1736 was given to a group of Carthusian monks to settle a debt. Other animals of these bloodlines were absorbed into the main Andalusian breed; the horses given to the monks were bred into a special line, known as Zamoranos. Throughout the following centuries, the Zamoranos bloodlines were guarded by the Carthusian monks, to the point of defying royal orders to introduce outside blood from the Neapolitan horse and central European breeds. They did, however, introduce Arabian and Barb blood to improve the strain. The original stock of Carthusians was greatly depleted during the Peninsular Wars, and the strain might have become extinct if not for the efforts of the Zapata family. Today, the Carthusian strain is raised in state-owned stud farms around Jerez de la Frontera, Badajoz and Córdoba, and also by several private families. Carthusian horses continue to be in demand in Spain, and buyers pay high prices for members of the strain.

=== Influence on other breeds ===
Spain's worldwide military activities between the 14th and 17th centuries called for large numbers of horses, more than could be supplied by native Spanish mares. Spanish custom also called for mounted troops to ride stallions, never mares or geldings. Due to these factors, Spanish stallions were crossed with local mares in many countries, adding Spanish bloodlines wherever they went, especially to other European breeds.

Because of the influence of the later Habsburg families, who ruled in both Spain and other nations of Europe, the Andalusian was crossbred with horses of Central Europe and the Low Countries, thus was closely related to many breeds that developed, including Neapolitan, Groningen, Lipizzaner, and Kladruber horses. Spanish horses have been used extensively in classical dressage in Germany since the 16th century. They thus influenced many German breeds, including the Hanoverian, Holstein, East Friesian and Oldenburg. Dutch breeds such as the Friesian and Gelderland also contain significant Spanish blood, as do Danish breeds such as the Frederiksborg and Knabstrupper.

Andalusians were a significant influence on the creation of the Alter Real, a strain of the Lusitano, and the Azteca, a Mexican breed created by crossing the Andalusian with American Quarter Horse and Criollo bloodlines. The Spanish jennet ancestors of the Andalusian also developed the Colonial Spanish Horse in America, which became the foundation bloodstock for many North and South American breeds. The Andalusian has also been used to create breeds more recently, with breed associations for both the Warlander (an Andalusian/Friesian cross) and the Spanish-Norman (an Andalusian/Percheron cross) being established in the 1990s.

== Naming and registration ==
Until modern times, horse breeds throughout Europe were known primarily by the name of the region where they were bred. Thus, the original term "Andalusian" simply described the horses of distinct quality that came from Andalusia in Spain. Similarly, the Lusitano, a Portuguese horse very similar to the Andalusian, takes its name from the ancient Roman province of Lusitania, now part of western Spain and most of Portugal.

The Andalusian horse has been known historically as the Iberian Saddle Horse, Iberian War Horse, Spanish Horse, Portuguese, Peninsular, Extremeño, Villanos, Zapata, Zamoranos, Castilian, and Jennet. The Portuguese name refers to what is now the Lusitano, while the Peninsular, Iberian Saddle Horse, and Iberian War Horse names refer to horses from the Iberian Peninsula as a whole. The Extremeño name refers to Spanish horses from the Extremadura province of Spain and the Zapata or Zapatero name to horses that come from the Zapata family stud. The Villano name has occasionally been applied to modern Andalusians, but originally referred to heavy, crossbred horses from the mountains north of Jaen. The Carthusian horse, also known as the Carthusian-Andalusian and the Cartujano, is a subtype of the Andalusian, rather than a distinct breed in itself. A common nickname for the Andalusian is the "Horse of Kings". Some sources state that the Andalusian and the Lusitano are genetically the same, differing only in the country of origin of individual horses.

In many areas today, the breeding, showing, and registration of the Andalusian and Lusitano are controlled by the same registries. One example of this is the International Andalusian and Lusitano Horse Association (IALHA), claimed to have the largest membership of any Andalusian registering organization. Other organizations, such as the Association of Purebred Spanish Horse Breeders of Spain (Asociación Nacional de Criadores de Caballo de Pura Raza Española, ANCCE), use the term pura raza española or PRE to describe the true Spanish horse, and claim sole authority to officially register and issue documentation for PRE horses, both in Spain and anywhere else in the world. In most of the world, the terms "Andalusian" and "PRE" are considered one and the same breed, but the public position of the ANCCE is that terms such as "Andalusian" and "Iberian horse" refer only to crossbreds, which the ANCCE considers to be horses that lack quality and purity, without official documentation or registration from official Spanish Stud Book.

In Australasia, the Australasia Andalusian Association registers Andalusians (which the registry considers an interchangeable term for PRE), Australian Andalusians, and partbred Andalusians. They share responsibility for the Purebred Iberian Horse (an Andalusian/Lusitano cross) with the Lusitano Association of Australasia. In the Australian registry, various levels of crossbred horses are known. A first-cross Andalusian is a crossbreed that is 50% Andalusian, while a second-cross Andalusian is the result of crossing a purebred Andalusian with a first-cross horse, resulting in a horse of 75% Andalusian blood. A third-cross horse, also known by the registry as an Australian Andalusian, is when a second-cross individual is mated with a foundation Andalusian mare. This sequence is known as a "breeding up" program by the registry.

=== Pure Spanish Horse (PRE) ===
The name pura raza española (PRE), usually rendered in English "Pure Spanish Horse" (not a literal translation) is the term used by the ANCCE, a private organization, and the Ministry of Agriculture of Spain. The ANCCE uses neither the term "Andalusian" nor "Iberian horse", and only registers horses that have certain recognized bloodlines. In addition, all breeding stock must undergo an evaluation process. The ANCCE was founded in 1972. Spain's Ministry of Agriculture recognizes the ANCCE as the representing entity for PRE breeders and owners across the globe, as well as the administrator of the breed stud book. ANCCE functions as the international parent association for all breeders worldwide who record their horses as PRE. For example, the United States PRE association is affiliated with ANCCE, follows ANCCE rules, and has a wholly separate governance system from the IALHA.

A second group, the Foundation for the Pure Spanish Horse or PRE Mundial, has begun another PRE registry as an alternative to the ANCCE. This new registry claims that all of their registered horses trace back to the original stud book maintained by the Cria Caballar, which was a branch of the Spanish Ministry of Defense, for 100 years. Thus, the PRE Mundial registry asserts that their registry is the most authentic, purest PRE registry functioning today.

As of August 2011, a lawsuit was in progress to determine the legal holder of the PRE stud book. The Unión de Criadores de Caballos Españoles (UCCE or Union of Spanish Horse Breeders) has brought a case to the highest European Union courts in Brussels, charging that the Ministry of Spain's transfer of the original PRE Libro de Origen (the official stud book) from the Cria Caballar to ANCCE was illegal. In early 2009, the courts decided on behalf of UCCE, explaining that the Cria Caballar formed the Libro de Origin. Because it was formed by a government entity, it is against European Union law for the stud book to be transferred to a private entity, a law that was broken by the transfer of the book to ANCCE, which is a nongovernmental organization. The court found that by giving ANCCE sole control of the stud book, Spain's Ministry of Defense was acting in a discriminatory manner. The court held that Spain must give permission to maintain a breed stud book (called a Libro Genealógico) to any international association or Spanish national association that requests it. Based on the Brussels court decision, an application has been made by the Foundation for the Pure Spanish Horse to maintain the United States stud book for the PRE. As of March 2011, Spain has not revoked ANCCE's right to be the sole holder of the PRE stud book, and has instead reaffirmed the organization's status.

== Uses ==
The Andalusian breed over the centuries has been consistently selected for athleticism. In the 17th century, referring to multikilometer races, Cavendish said, "They were so much faster than all other horses known at that time that none was ever seen to come close to them, even in the many remarkable races that were run." In 1831, horses at five years old were expected to be able to gallop, without changing pace, four or five leagues, about 12 to 15 miles (19 to 24 km). By 1925, the Portuguese military expected horses to "cover 40 km over uneven terrain at a minimum speed of 10 km/h, and to gallop a flat course of 8 km at a minimum speed of 800 metres per minute carrying a weight of at least 70 kg", and the Spanish military had similar standards.

From the beginning of their history, Andalusians have been used for both riding and driving. Among the first horses used for classical dressage, they still compete in international competition in dressage today. At the 2002 World Equestrian Games, two Andalusians were on the bronze medal-winning Spanish dressage team, which went on to take the silver medal at the 2004 Summer Olympics. Today, the breed is increasingly being selectively bred for increased aptitude in classical dressage. Historically, however, they were also used as stock horses, especially suited to working with Iberian bulls, known for their aggressive temperaments. They were and still are known for their use in mounted bull fighting. Mares were traditionally used for la trilla, the Spanish process of threshing grain practiced until the 1960s. Mares, some pregnant or with foals at their side, spent full days trotting over the grain. As a traditional farming practice, it also served as a test of endurance, hardiness, and willingness for the maternal Andalusian lines.

Andalusians today are also used for show jumping, western pleasure, and other horse show events. As of 2025, the mascot of the University of Southern California is an Andalusian named Traveler IX. The dramatic appearance of the Andalusian horse, with its arched neck, muscular build, and energetic gaits, has made it a popular breed to use in film, particularly in historical and fantasy epics. Andalusians have been present in films ranging from Gladiator to Interview with the Vampire, and Lara Croft Tomb Raider: The Cradle of Life to Braveheart. The horses have also been seen in such fantasy epics as The Lord of the Rings film trilogy, King Arthur, and The Chronicles of Narnia: The Lion, the Witch and the Wardrobe. In 2006, a rearing Andalusian stallion, ridden by Spanish conquistador Don Juan de Oñate, was recreated as the largest bronze equine in the world. Measuring 11 m (36 ft) high, the statue currently stands in El Paso, Texas.

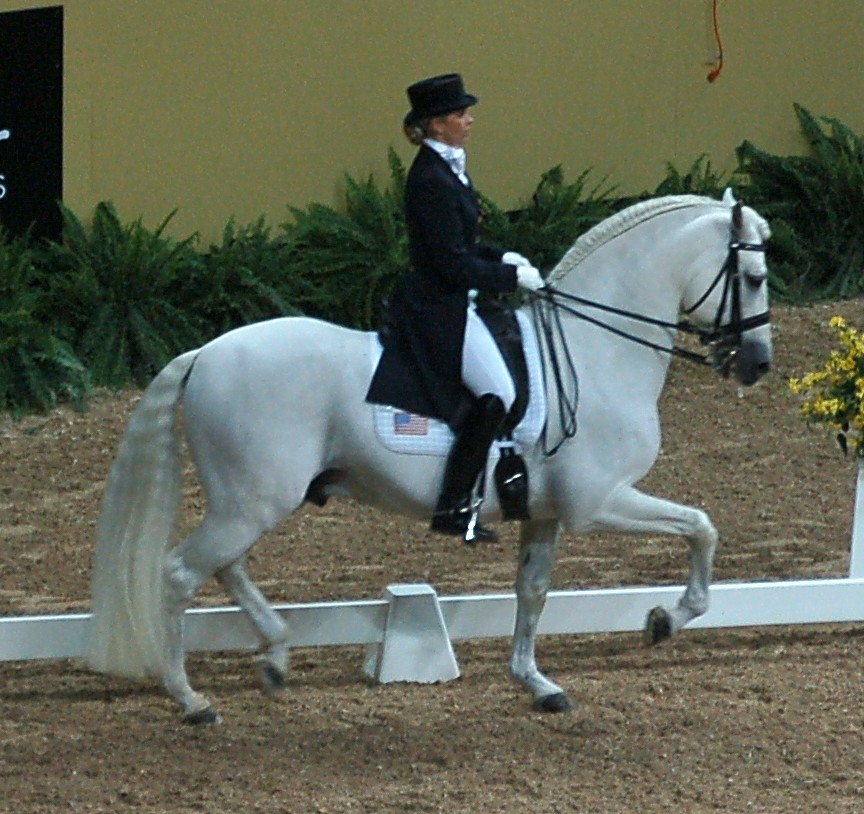
Performing dressage

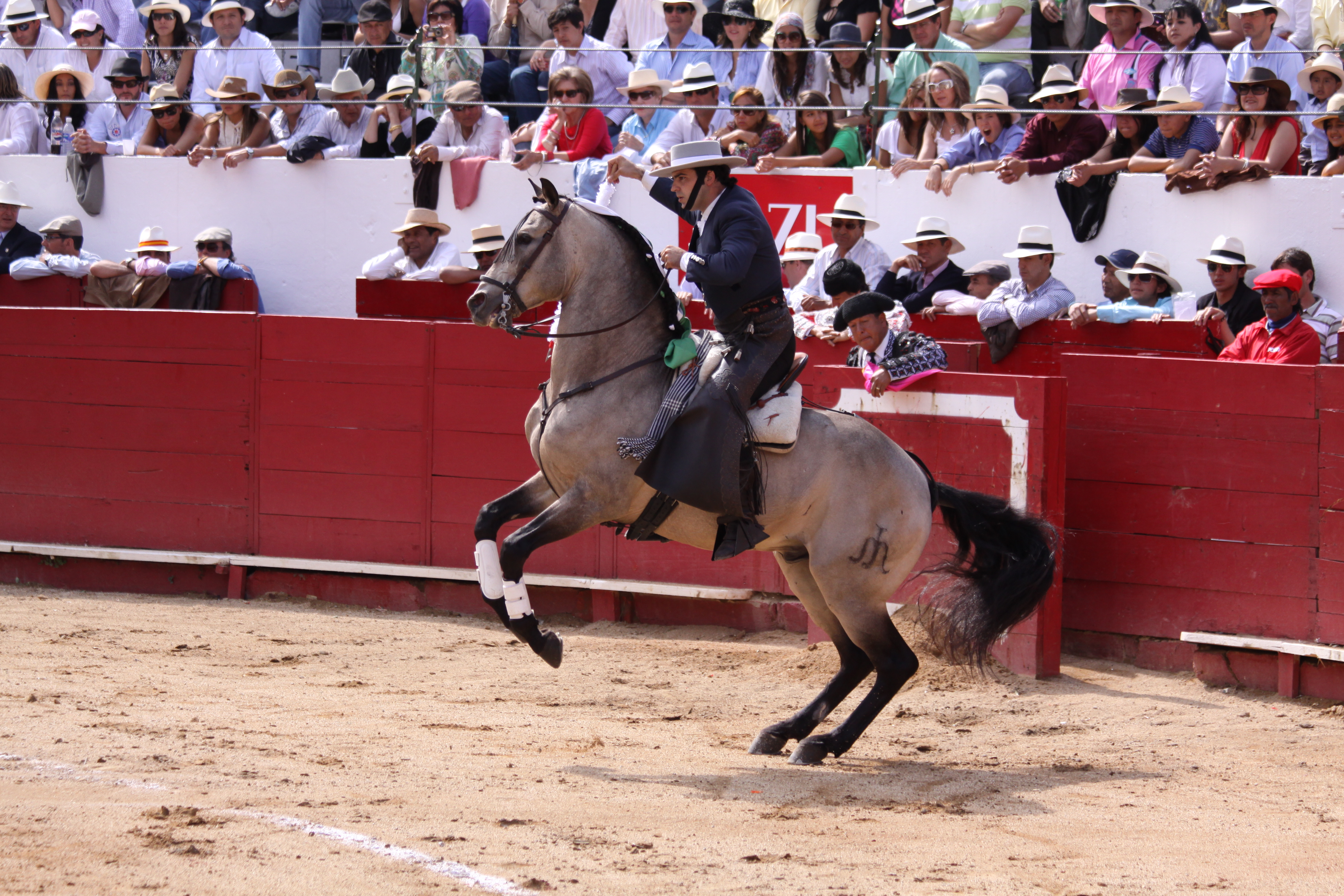
In the bullfighting ring

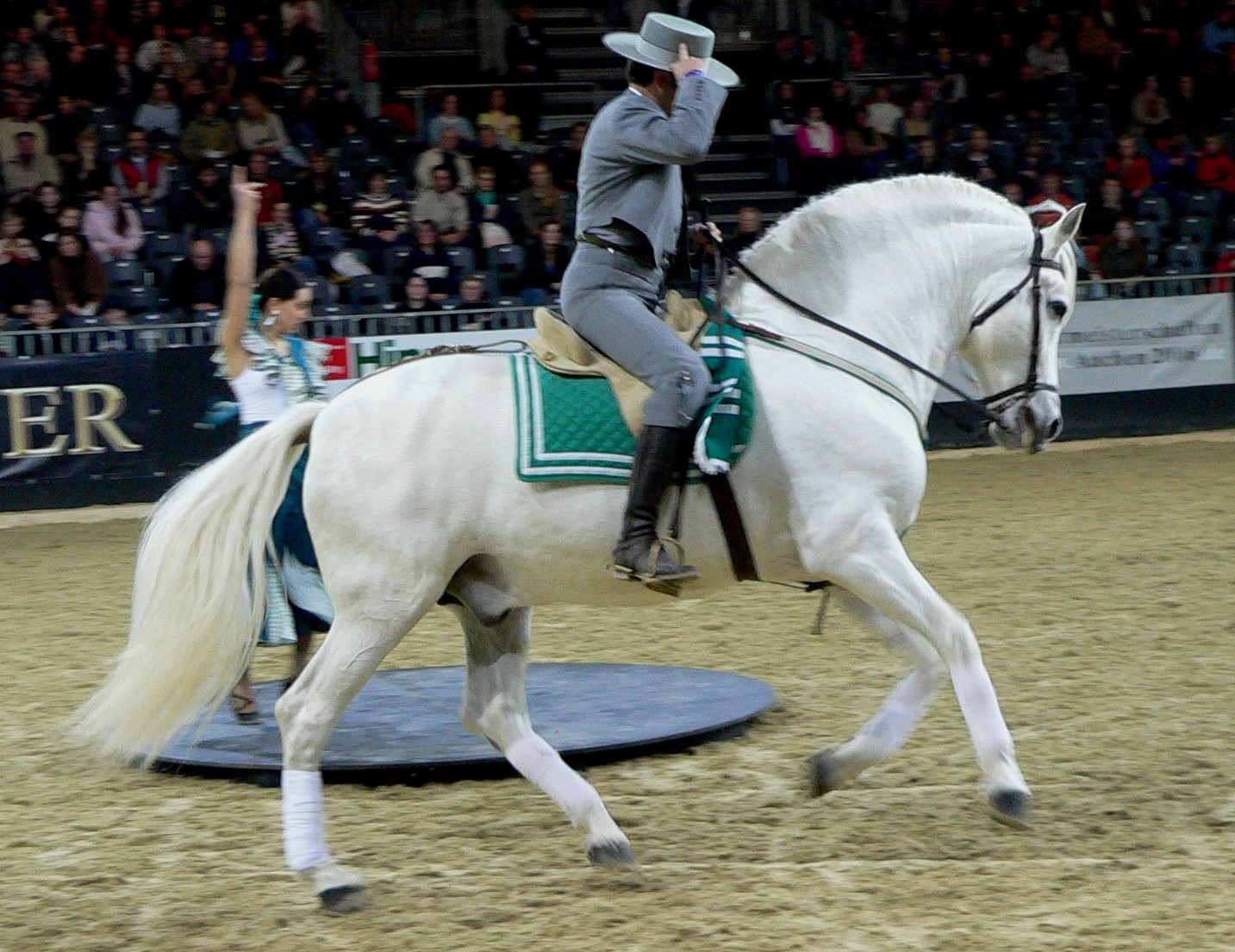
Demonstration of doma vaquera riding

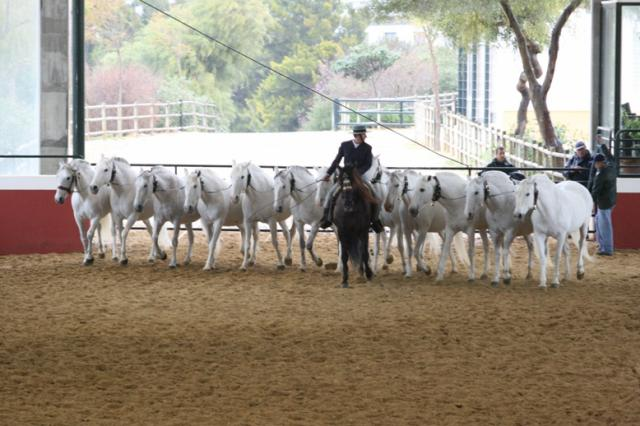
A "cobra" of Andalusians
