= Azteca horse =

Breed of horse

Azteca
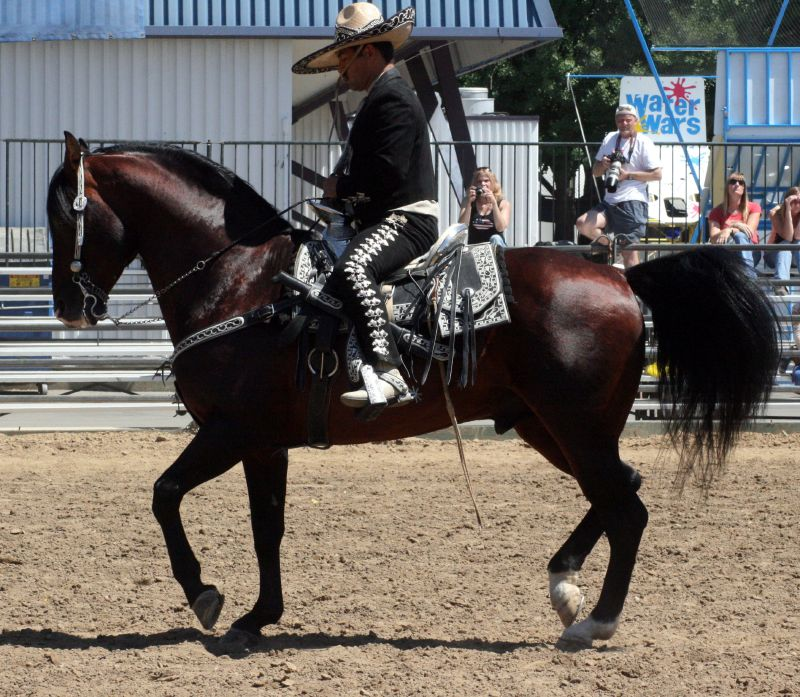

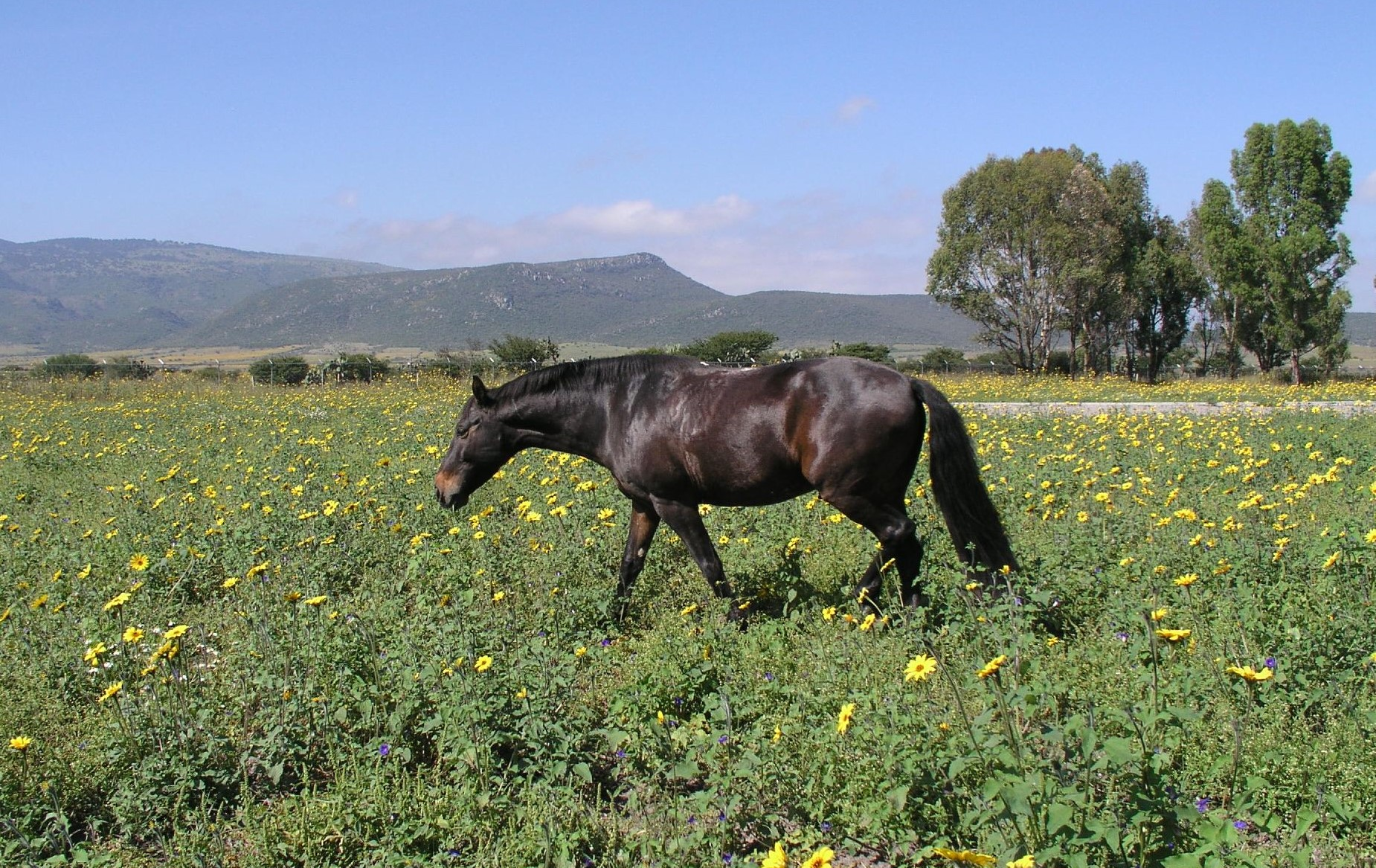
- Country of origin: Mexico

The Azteca is a horse breed from Mexico, with a subtype, called the "American Azteca", found in the United States. They are well-muscled horses that may be of any solid color, and the American Azteca may also have Pinto coloration. Aztecas are known to compete in many western riding and some English riding disciplines. The Mexican registry for the original Azteca and the United States registries for the American Azteca have registration rules that vary in several key aspects, including ancestral bloodlines and requirements for physical inspections. The Azteca was first developed in Mexico in 1972, from a blend of Andalusian, American Quarter Horse and Mexican Criollo bloodlines. From there, they spread to the United States, where American Paint Horse blood was added.

== Characteristics ==
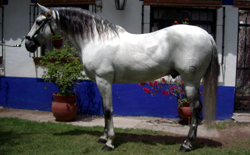
Side view

The three foundation breeds of the Azteca are the Andalusian (defined by the Mexican registry as either Pura Raza Española or Lusitano), American Quarter Horse, and Mexican Criollo or Criollo militar. They were chosen to produce a breed that combined athletic ability with a good temperament and certain physical characteristics. Azteca stallions and geldings measure between 15 and 16.1 hands (60 and 65 inches, 152 and 165 cm) at the withers, while mares stand between 14.3 and 16 hands (59 and 64 inches, 150 and 163 cm). The ideal height is 14.3–15.1 hands (59–61 inches, 150–155 cm). Both sexes usually weigh from 1,000 to 1,200 pounds (450 to 540 kg). The facial profile of the breed is straight or convex and the neck slightly arched. Overall, they are well-muscled horses, with broad croup and chest, as well as long, sloping shoulders. Gaits are free and mobile, with natural collection derived from the Andalusian ancestry of the breed. The breed is found in all solid colors, although gray is most often seen. White markings are allowed on the face and lower legs by breed associations. The American Azteca registry also allows non-solid pinto coloration.

=== Registration ===
According to the breed standard of the Mexican registry, Azteca horses cannot have more than 75 percent of their parentage from any one of the foundation breeds (Andalusian, Quarter Horse and Mexican Criollo); Criollo blood may be no more than 50%, and only from unregistered mares within Mexico. Horses are classified in one of six registration categories, designated with letters A through F, depending on their parentage. Only certain crosses between the different classes are permitted. In Mexico, Azteca horses must conform to a strict phenotype standard established by the Secretaría de Agricultura, Ganadería, Desarrollo Rural, Pesca y Alimentación (SAGARPA), the Mexican agriculture ministry, which requires inspection of foals at seven months for the issue of a "birth certificate"; a foal that does not meet the breed standards may be denied registration even if both parents are registered Aztecas approved for breeding. Full registration and approval for breeding are subject to a second and more detailed inspection at age three or more, and granted only to those horses that fully satisfy the requirements of the standard.

In the American Azteca registry, horses with American Paint Horse (APHA) breeding are also allowed. However, horses with more than 25 percent Thoroughbred blood in their pedigrees (common in many Paints and Quarter Horses) within four generations cannot be registered. American Aztecas have four categories of registration based on the relative degree of blood from each foundation breed, seeking an ideal blend of 3/8 Quarter Horse and 5/8 Andalusian. Unlike their Mexican counterparts, they do not have to go through physical inspections before being registered.

== Breed history ==
The Azteca was first bred in 1972 as a horse for charros, the traditional horsemen of Mexico. Antonio Ariza Cañadilla, along with others, was instrumental in the creation of the Azteca horse as the national horse of Mexico and with its official recognition by the Mexican Department of Agriculture on November 4, 1982. Ariza used imported Andalusians, crossed with Quarter Horses and Criollos and began to breed the foundation horses of the Azteca breed at Rancho San Antonio near Texcoco, Mexico. Early in the Azteca's history, breeders realized the need for a unified breeding program in order to produce horses that met the required characteristics. The Azteca Horse Research Center was created at Lake Texcoco, and in partnership with breeders developed the phenotype of the breed today. The first official Azteca was a stallion named Casarejo, who was a cross between an Andalusian stallion named Ocultado and a Quarter Horse mare named Americana. He was foaled at the Centro de Reproduccion Caballar Domecq in 1972.

The Associacion Mexicana de Criadores de Caballos de Raza Azteca, or Mexican Breeders Association for the Azteca Horse, is the original breed registry and still maintains the international registry. The International Azteca Horse Association and its regional affiliates was formed in 1992. The majority of Aztecas are found in Mexico, and the Mexican association had registered between 10,000 and 15,000 horses as of 2005, according to the Texas Department of Agriculture. The Mexican registry adds approximately 1,000 horses per year.

The Azteca Horse Registry of America was formed in 1989 for registering the US portion of the breed, followed by the Azteca Horse Owners Association in 1996 as an owners association. This registry has slightly different registration and breeding rules, and is not approved by the Mexican government to register Azteca horses. The American registry, now called the American Azteca Horse International Association, allows the use of American Paint horses, which are essentially Quarter Horses with pinto coloration, if they have less than 25 percent Thoroughbred breeding. However, the US registry does not incorporate Criollo bloodlines. The Mexican registry allows only the blood of Quarter Horses, Andalusians and Criollos in its registered Aztecas.

== Uses ==
Because of the breeds that make up the Azteca, they are known for their athleticism. They have been seen in competition in western riding events such as reining, cutting, team penning and roping, as well as English riding events such as dressage and other events such as polo and bullfighting. They are also used for pleasure riding.
