= Spanish Norman =

American breed of horse

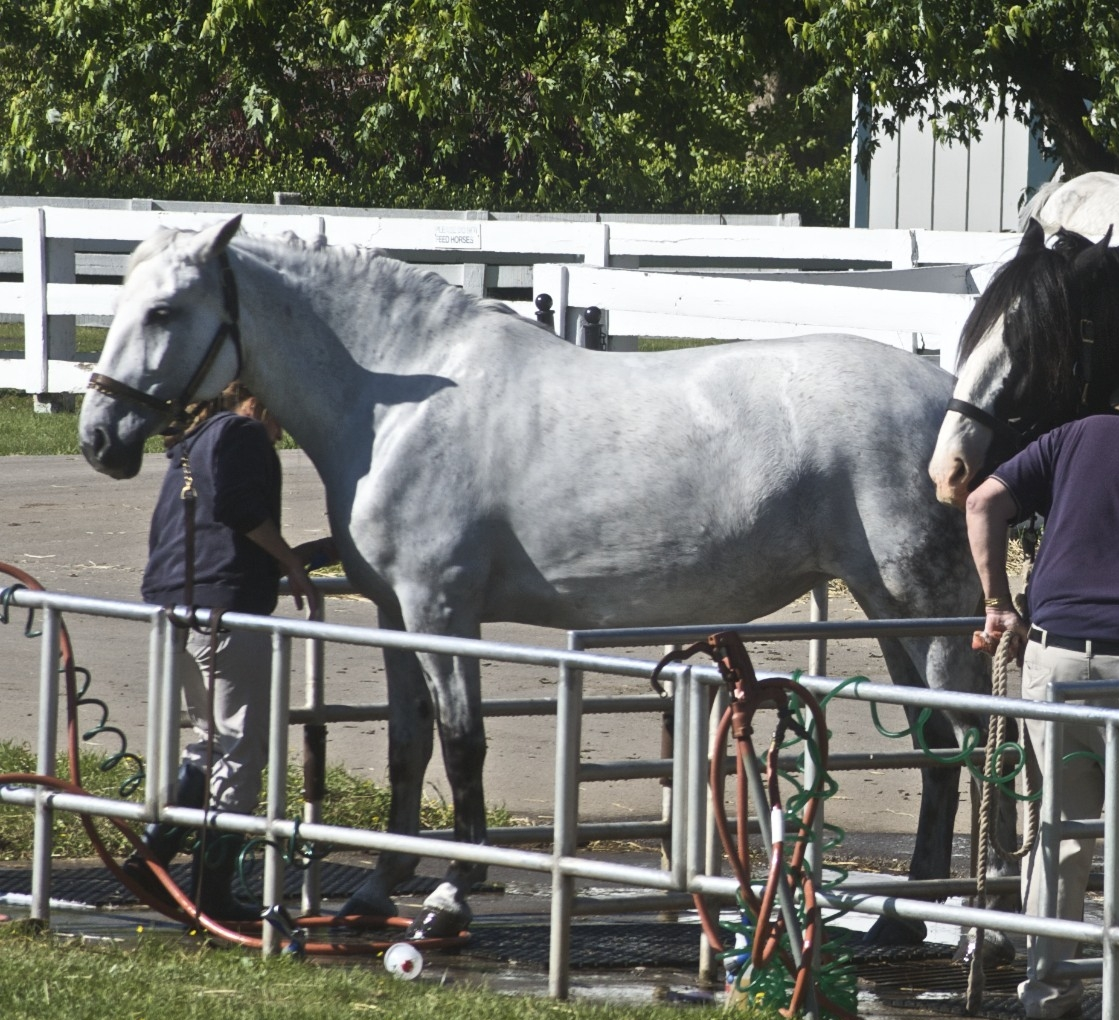
- A Spanish Norman horse
- Conservation status: FAO (2007): not listed; DAD-IS (2023): not listed
- Other names: Spanish-Norman Horse
- Country of origin: United States
- Use: sport horse, driving, showing

Traits
- Height: 160–173 cm (15.3–17.0 h)
- Color: gray, black or bay

Breed standards
- Spanish-Norman Horse Registry; British Association for the Purebred Spanish Horse

The Spanish Norman is an American horse of warmblood type, a crossbreed of the Andalusian and Percheron. In 1991, a registry was created in Connecticut in the United States to maintain records of the breed. The Spanish-Norman is bred primarily as a sport horse.

== History ==
Both the Andalusian and the Percheron have Spanish and Barb ancestry. The Andalusian horse is descended from the Iberian horses of Spain and Portugal, and derives its name from its place of origin, the Spanish region of Andalusia. Throughout history, the Iberian breeds have been influenced by many different people and cultures who occupied Spain, including the Celts, the Carthaginians, the Romans, various Germanic tribes and the Moors. The Iberian horse was identified as a talented war horse as early as 450 BCE. Despite their ancient history, all living Andalusians trace to a small number of horses bred by religious orders in the 18th and 19th centuries. An influx of heavy horse blood beginning in the 16th century, resulted in the dilution of many of the bloodlines; only those protected by selective breeding remained intact to become the modern Andalusian.

The Percheron breed originated in France, taking its name from the former Perche province. Its exact origins are unknown, and several theories have been put forth as to the ancestors of the breed. These theories include the Percheron originating variously from Arabian stallions brought to the area by 8th century Muslim invaders, Moorish cavalry horses from the Battle of Poitiers and Boulonnais horses used by Caesars legions. It is known that much Arabian, Oriental and Spanish blood was added during the breed's history.

== Breed characteristics ==
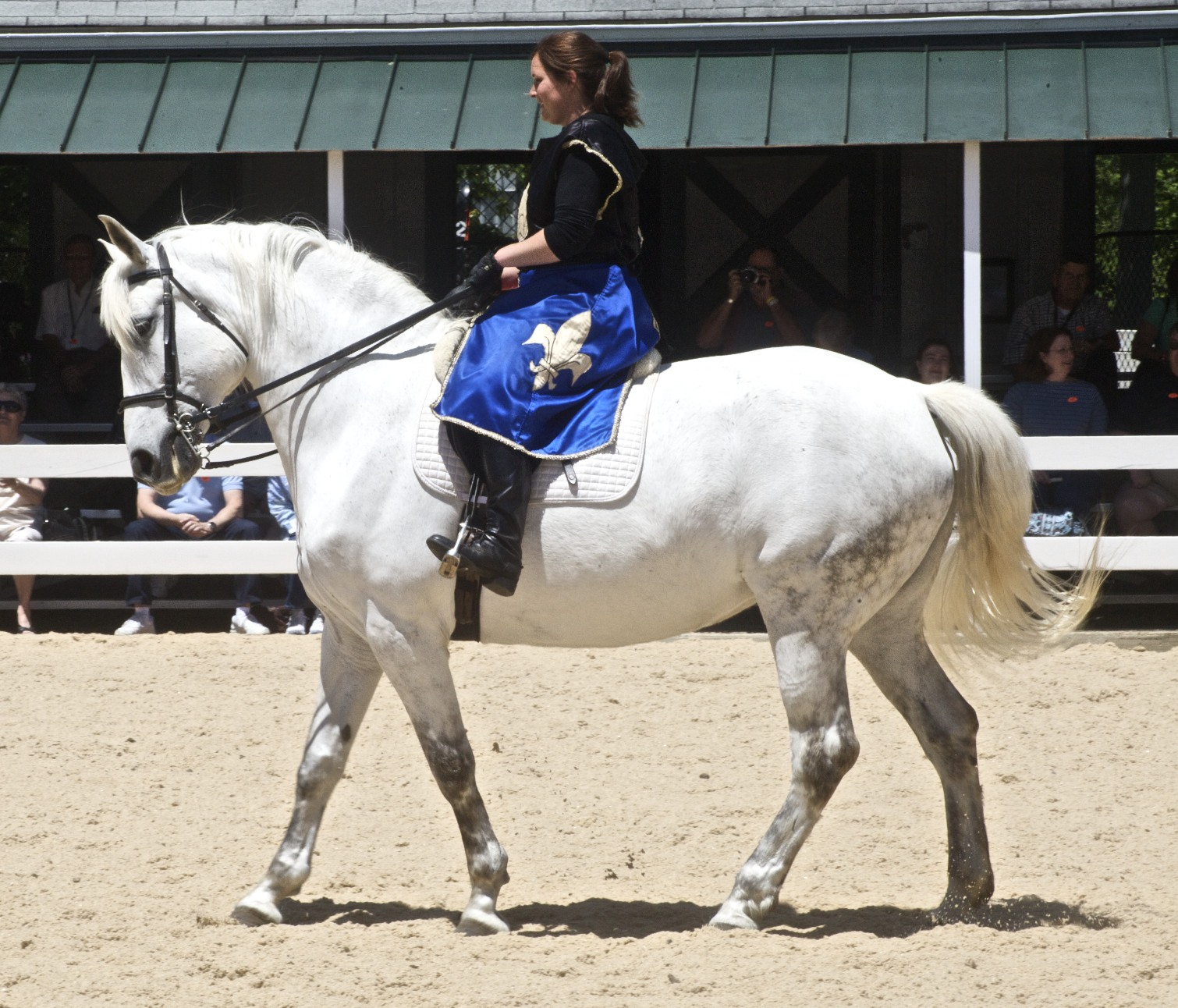
A Spanish-Norman showing the typical gray color

The Spanish-Norman stands 15.3 to 17 hands (63 to 68 inches, 160 to 173 cm). Like both the Percheron and the Andalusian the predominant color is gray, although some bay and black individuals are also seen. It shares the Percheron's size and density of bone; like the Andalusian, the Spanish-Norman has a refined, convex head, long neck and legs, broad chest, short back, well-muscled hindquarters and a generous mane and tail. Since Spanish-Norman horses are required to possess at least 50 percent Andalusian blood, they are eligible for dual registry as half-Andalusians by the International Andalusian and Lusitano Horse Association and eligible to compete in IALHA-sponsored shows. As of 2011, over 100 Andalusian stallions are registered as foundation sires in the Spanish-Norman breed registry. Percheron mares are required to be registered with either the Percheron Association of America or the Canadian Percheron Association.

== Uses ==
With a combination of strength from the Percheron and elegance from the Andalusian, the Spanish-Norman is well suited for the show ring in driving classes and eventing. Like the Andalusian, it is also used as a parade and exhibition horse.

== See also ==
Designer crossbred
