= Hair whorl (horse) =

Horse coat feature

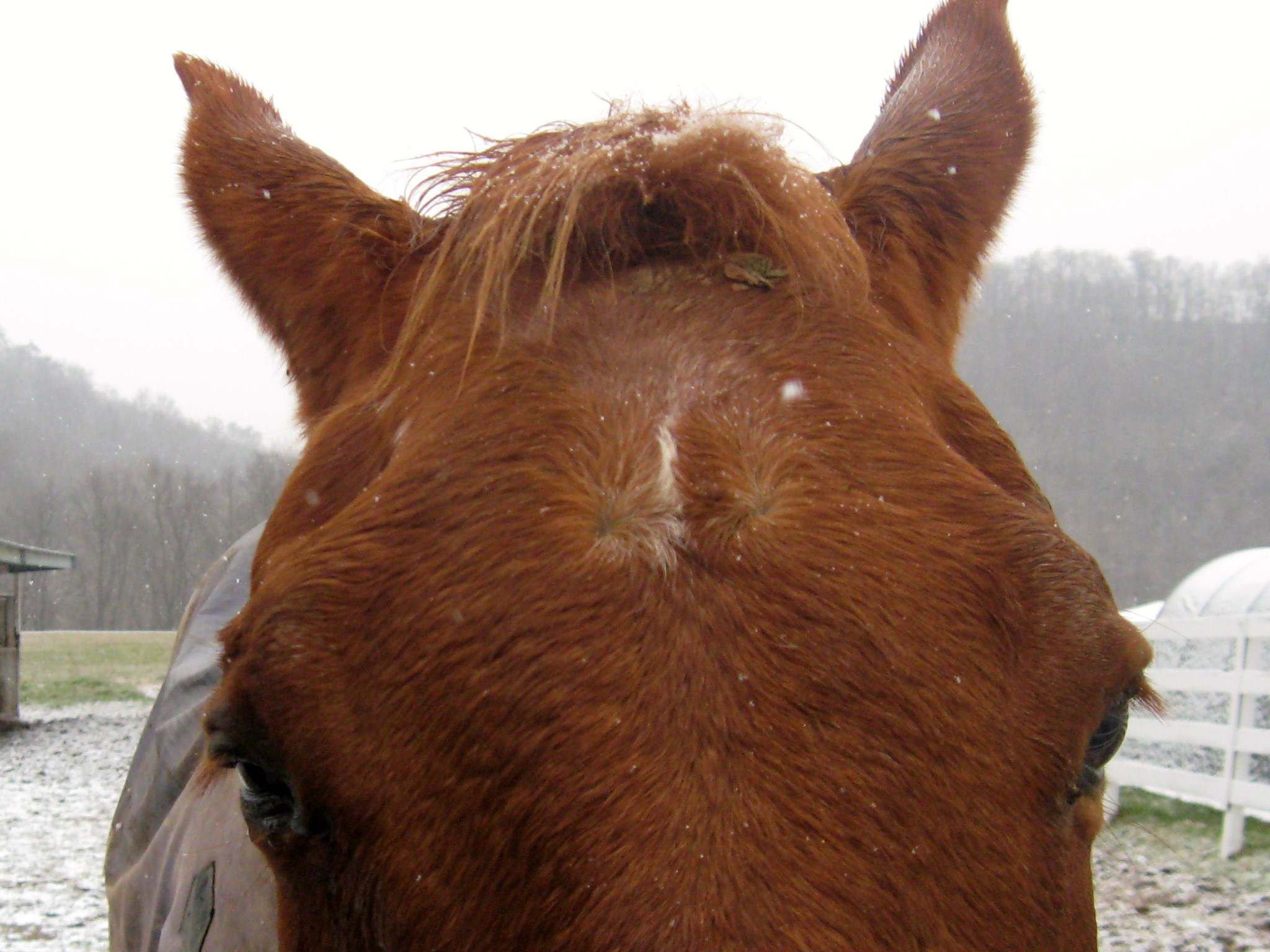
A horse with two hair whorls on its forehead

A hair whorl is a patch of hair growing in the opposite direction of the rest of the hair. Hair whorls can occur on animals with hairy coats, and are often found on horses and cows. Locations where whorls are found in equines include the stomach, face, stifle and hocks. Hair whorls in horses are also known as crowns, swirls, trichoglyphs, or cowlicks.

Hair whorls are sometimes classified according to the direction of hair growth (e.g. clockwise or counterclockwise), shape, or other physical characteristics.

Anecdotal evidence claims a statistical correlation between the location, number, or type of whorls and behaviour or temperament in horses and other species. (Note: See Correlation does not imply causation) There is some research suggesting that the direction of hair whorls may correlate to a horse's preference for the right or left lead and other directionality.

== History ==
The theories that hair whorls could describe various physical and personality characteristics in horses have been around for thousands of years.

There are references of hair whorls in the works of the Indian sage Salihotra. Bedouin horsemen used whorls to determine the value of horses for sale. One Arabian horse has been recorded with 40 whorls on his body, although the average horse has around six. Bedouins looked for whorls between the horse's ears as a sign of swiftness, and if there were any on either side of the neck, they were known as the 'finger of the Prophet'.

One legend of whorls is the "Prophet's Thumbprint" a birthmark in the form of an indentation, usually found on the side of a horse’s neck, totally harmless although it comes with a legend.

The Prophet Mohammed was wandering the desert with his herd of horses for many days, and as they approached an oasis he sent them forth to drink. But as the thirsty horses approached the water, he called them back. Only five of his mares stopped and returned to him, and to thank them for their loyalty he blessed them by pressing his thumbprint into their necks.

It’s believed that a horse with such a mark will be outstanding, being a descendant of one of these brood mares that the Prophet Mohammed particularly treasured.

Other Bedouin beliefs include:

- A whorl on the chest meant prosperity.
- A whorl on the girth was a sign of good fortune, and an increase in flocks
- A whorl on the flank was known as a 'spur whorl' and if curved up meant safety in battle; if inclined downwards it meant prosperity. The Byerley Turk, a founding sire of the Thoroughbred breed, was said to have spur whorls and was never hurt in battle.
- The Whorl of the Sultan was located on the windpipe, and meant love and prosperity.
- Whorls above the eyes meant the master was to die of a head injury
- The whorl of the coffin was located close to the withers. If sloping downwards towards the shoulder it meant the rider would die in the saddle, probably in battle or from a gunshot.

== Classification ==
There are several types of whorls on horses:

- Simple: hairs draw into a single point from all directions
- Tufted: hairs converges and piles up into a tuft
- Linear: hair growing in opposite directions meet along the same line vertically
- Crested: hair growing in opposite directions meet to form a crest
- Feathered: hair meets along a line but at an angle to form a feathered pattern
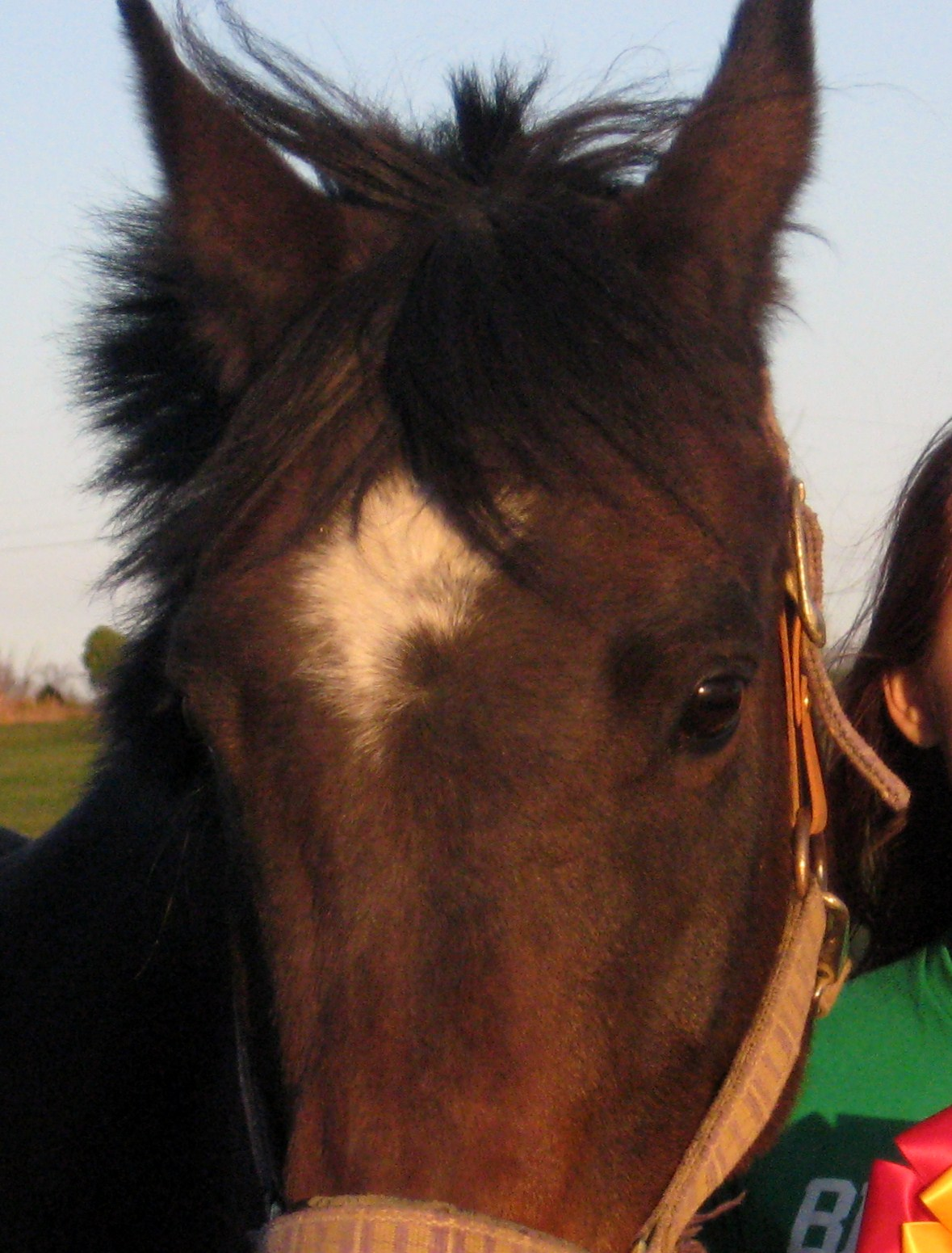
Single simple counter-clockwise whorl

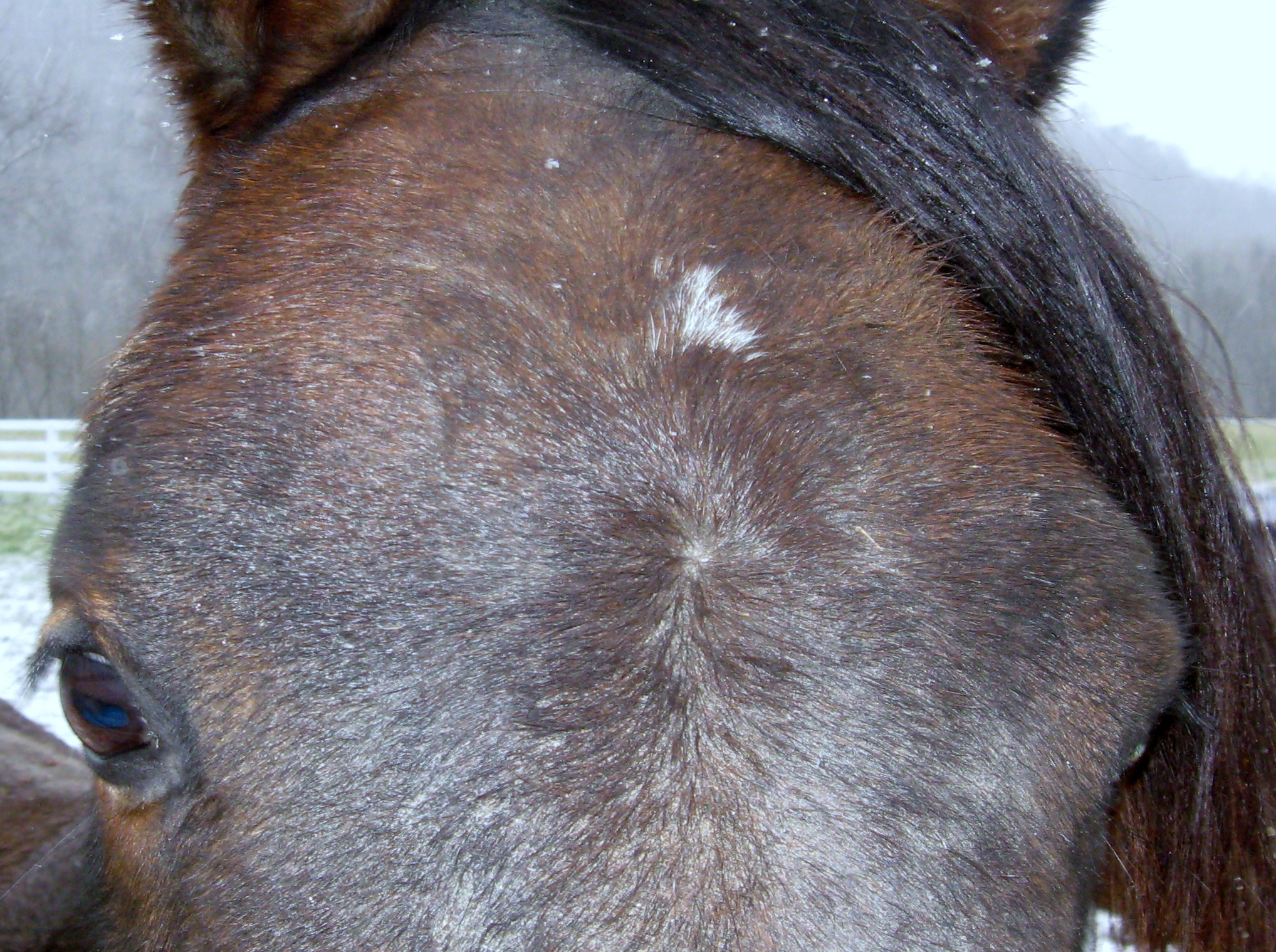
Single simple counter-clockwise whorl

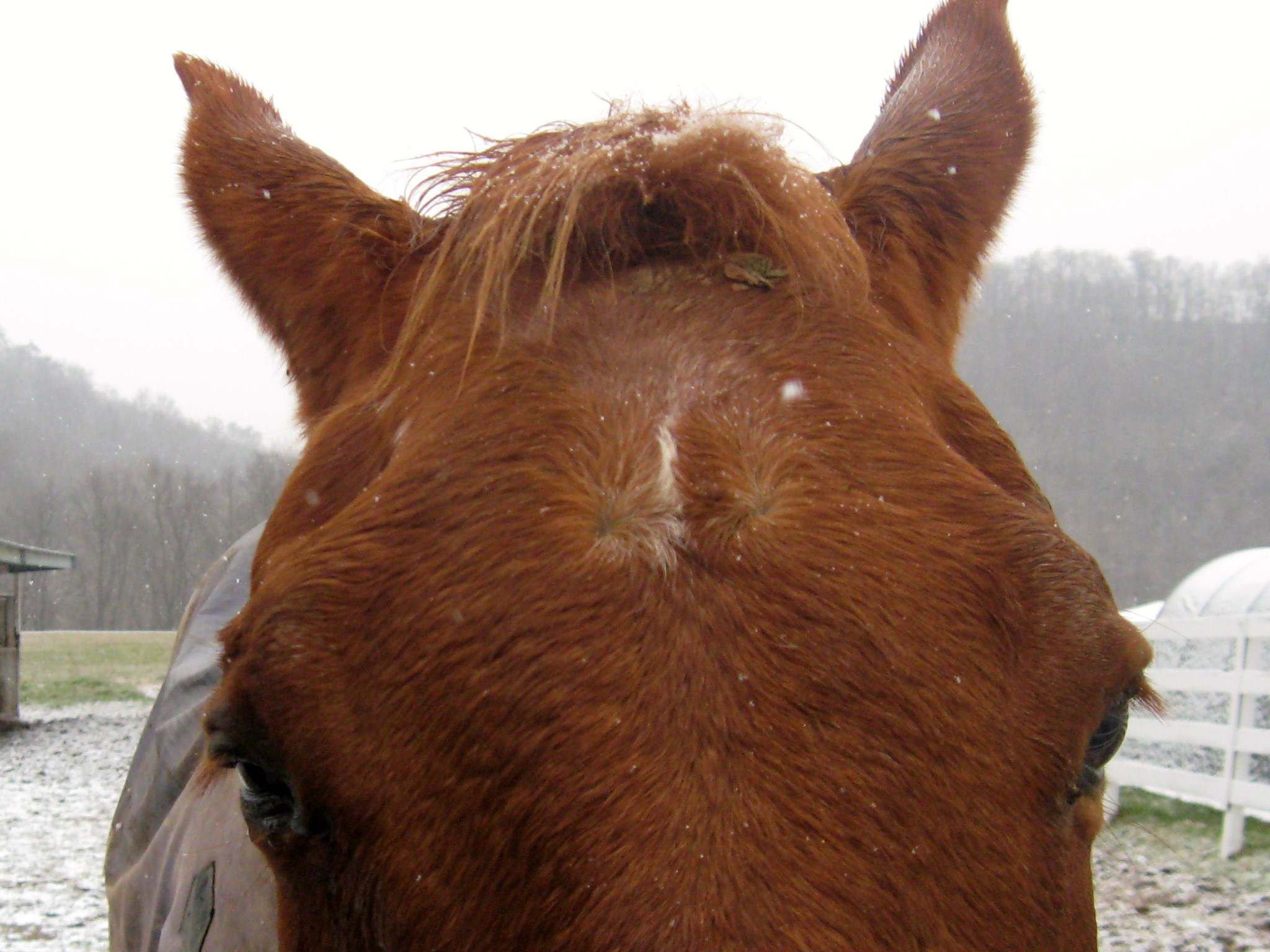
Two whorls: one simple counter-clockwise and one simple clockwise

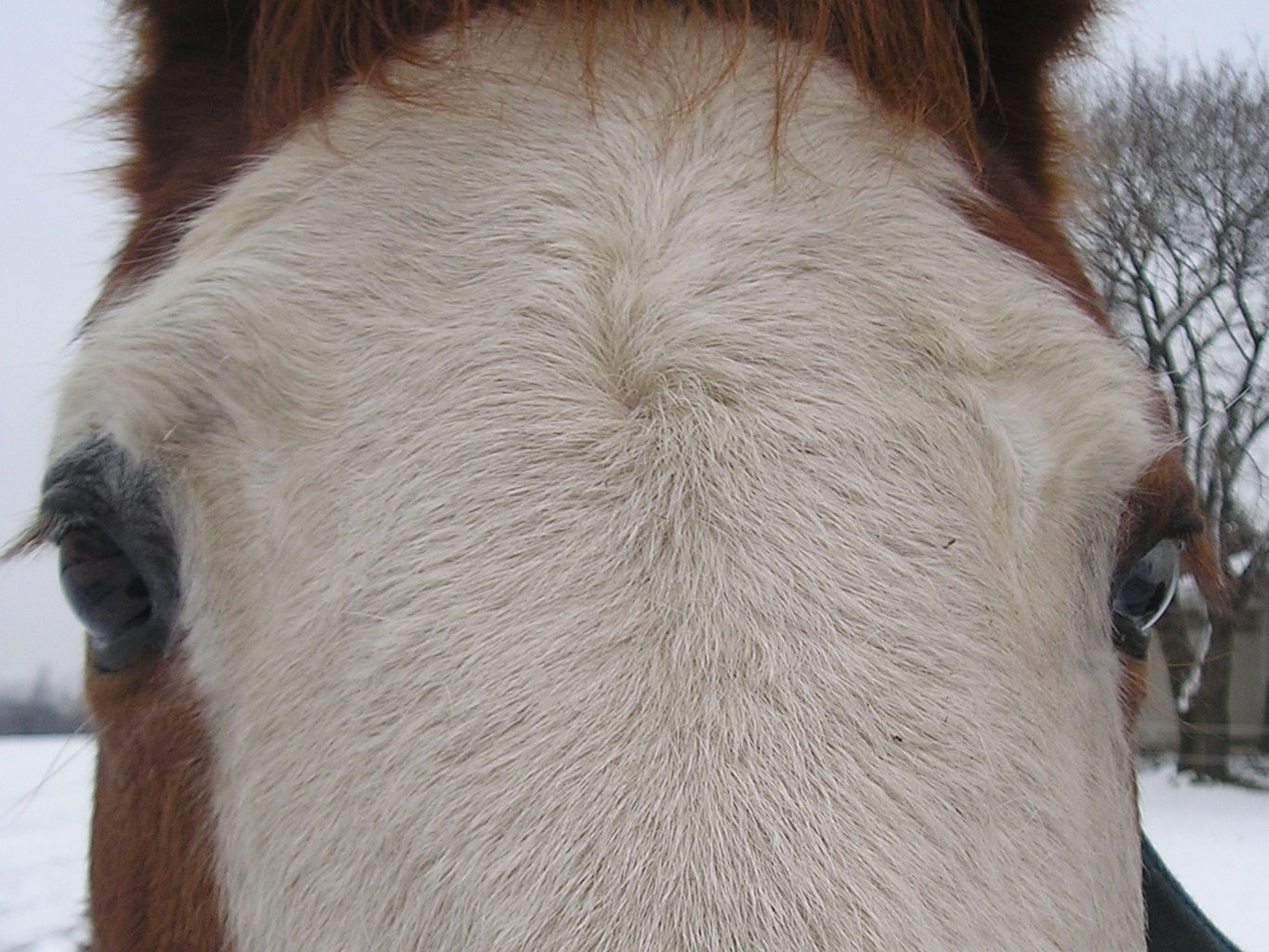
Slightly tufted clockwise whorl

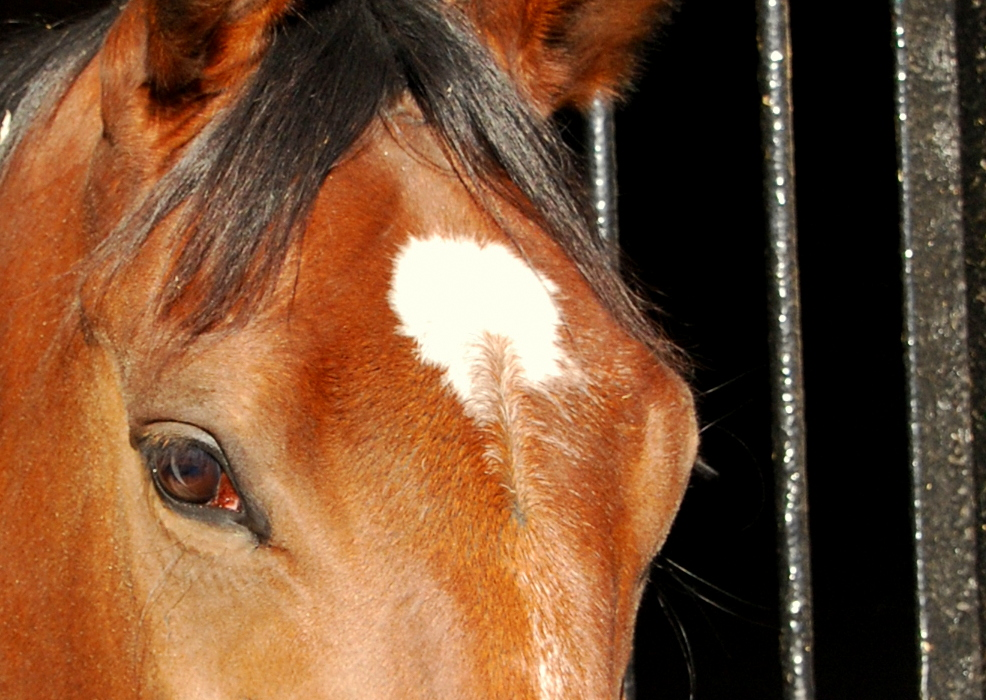
Linear whorl

== Relation to behaviour ==
Several studies have reported a statistical relationship between the location, number, or type of whorls and behaviour or temperament in horses.

One study of 219 working horses found a relation between the direction of facial hair whorls and motor laterality; right-lateralised horses had significantly more clockwise facial hair whorls and left-lateralised horses had significantly more counter-clockwise facial hair whorls.

Konik horses with a single whorl located above their eyes were rated as more difficult to handle whereas horses that also had a single whorl but located below or right in between their eyes were easier to handle. Whorls that were found to be elongated or doubled acted the most cautious when coming up to an unfamiliar object. They looked longer and were slower to approaching then the single whorled horses.

Lundy ponies with 'left' whorls score highly on calmness, placidness, enthusiasm and friendliness, whereas those with 'right' whorls score highly on wariness, associated flightiness and unfriendliness. Ponies with two facial whorls are rated as significantly more 'enthusiastic' and less 'wary' than those with one or three facial whorls.

Whorls on Thoroughbred horses may be physical indicators of a predisposition to perform repetitive abnormal behaviours, i.e. stereotypies.
