= Lusitano =

Horse breed from Portugal

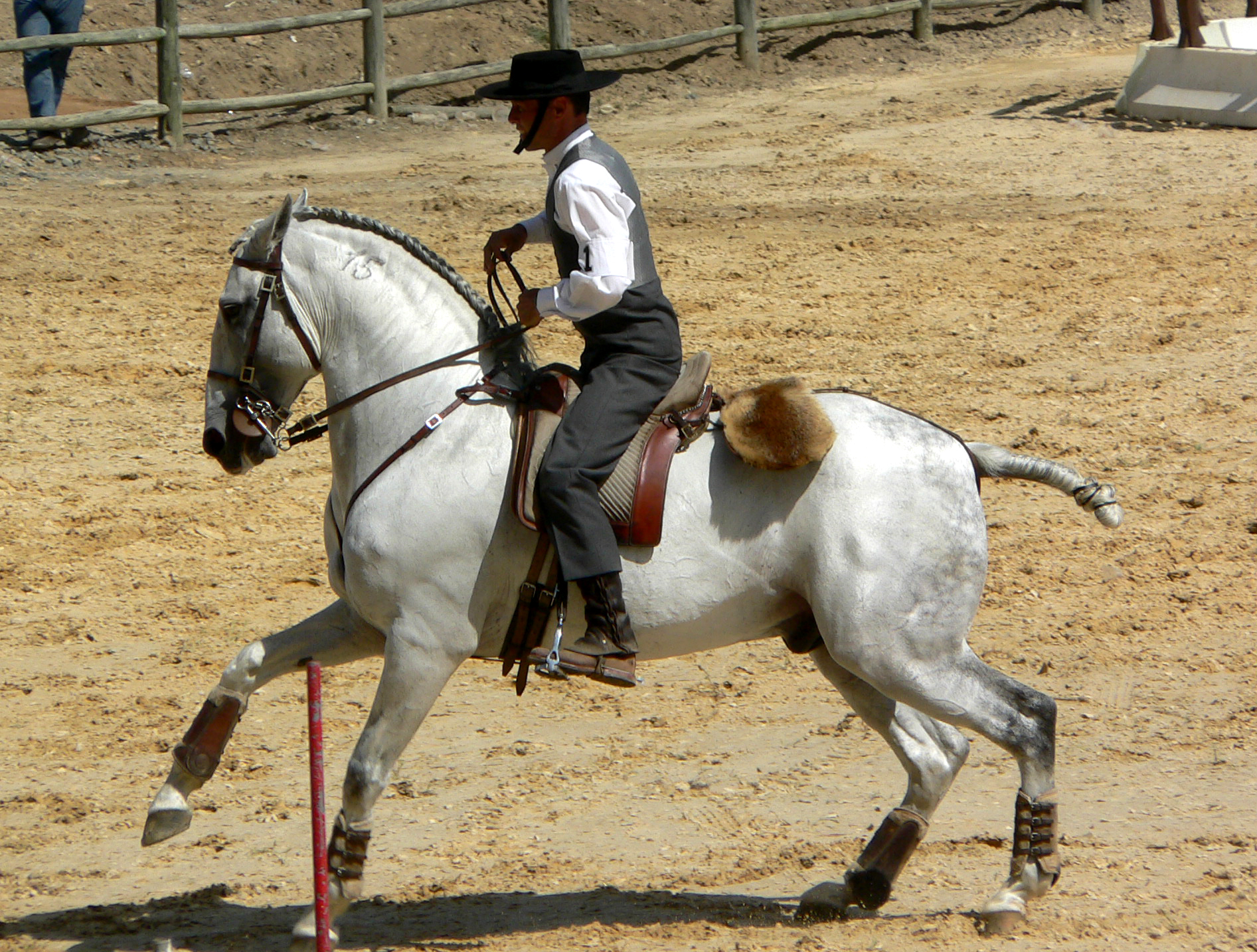

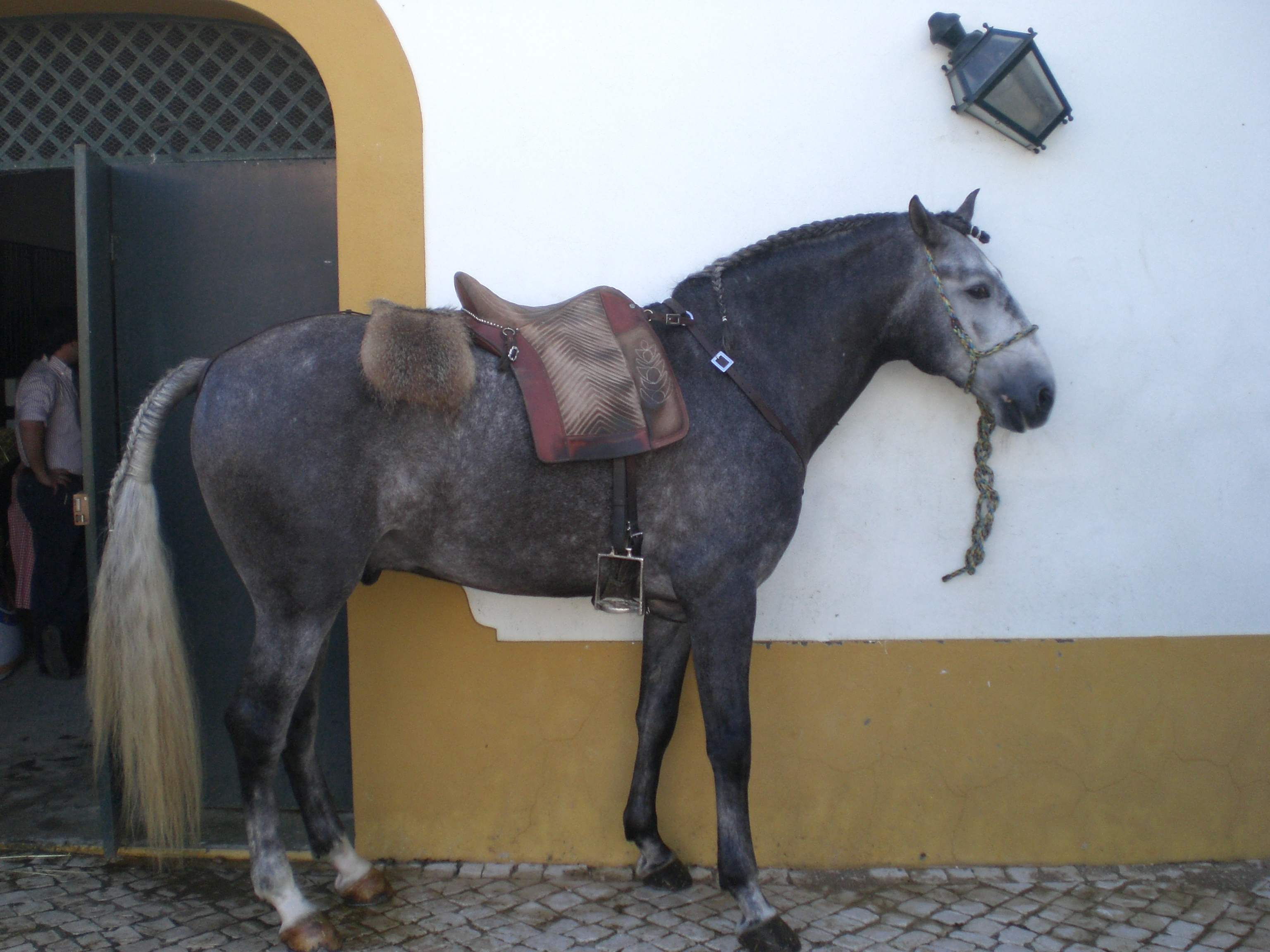
- Other names: Portuguese horse, Peninsular horse, Betico-lusitano
- Country of origin: Portugal

Traits
- Distinguishing features: Convex profile, powerful neck and hindquarters, high-stepping gait

Breed standards
- APSL; IALHA (USA); LHAA (Australasia)

The Lusitano, also known as the Pure Blood Lusitano or PSL (Puro Sangue Lusitano), is a Portuguese horse breed. Horses were known to be present on the Iberian Peninsula as far back as 20,000 BC, and by 800 BC the region was renowned for its war horses. The fame of the horses from Lusitania goes back to the Roman Age, which attributed its speed to the influence of the West wind, who was considered capable of fertilizing the mares. When the Muslims invaded Iberia in 711 AD, they brought Arabian horses with them that were crossed with the native horses, developing a horse that became useful for war, dressage and bull fighting. The Portuguese horse was named the Lusitano, after the word Lusitania, the ancient Roman name for the region that modern Portugal occupies. There are four main breed lineages within the breed today, and characteristics differ slightly between each line.

Lusitanos can be any solid color, although they are generally gray, bay or chestnut. Horses of the Alter Real strain are always brown. Members of the breed have convex facial profiles, heavy muscling, intelligent and willing natures, with agile and elevated movement. Originally bred for war, dressage and bullfighting, Lusitanos are still used today in the latter two. They have competed in several Olympics and World Equestrian Games as part of the Portuguese and Spanish dressage teams. They have also made a showing in driving competitions, with a Belgian team of Lusitanos winning multiple international titles.

== History ==
Horses were known to humans on what is now the Iberian Peninsula as far back as 25,000 to 20,000 BC, as shown by cave paintings in the area. Among the local wild horses originally used by humans were the probable ancestors of the modern Lusitano, as studies comparing ancient and modern horse DNA indicate that the modern "Lusitano C" group contains maternal lineages also present in wild Iberian horses from the Early Neolithic period. These ancient horses were used for war, with clear evidence of their use by Phoenicians around 1100 BC and Celts around 600 BC. It is believed that these invaders also brought horses with them, contributing outside blood to the ancestry of the modern Iberian breeds. By 800 BC, the alliance known as Celtiberians had been formed by the Iberians and Celts, and from this point on the horses bred in this area were renowned as war horses. Xenophon, writing around 370 BC, admired the advanced horsemanship and riding techniques used by Iberian horsemen in war, made possible in part by their agile horses. Legend claimed that mares of the area were sired by the wind (hence their amazing swiftness, passed onto their foals), and one modern hypothesis suggests that the bond between Iberian humans and horses was the initial inspiration for the centaur, which was believed to come from the area of the Tagus River. Later invasions into the area by Carthaginians and Romans resulted in these civilizations establishing stud farms that bred cavalry horses for the Roman army from local stock.

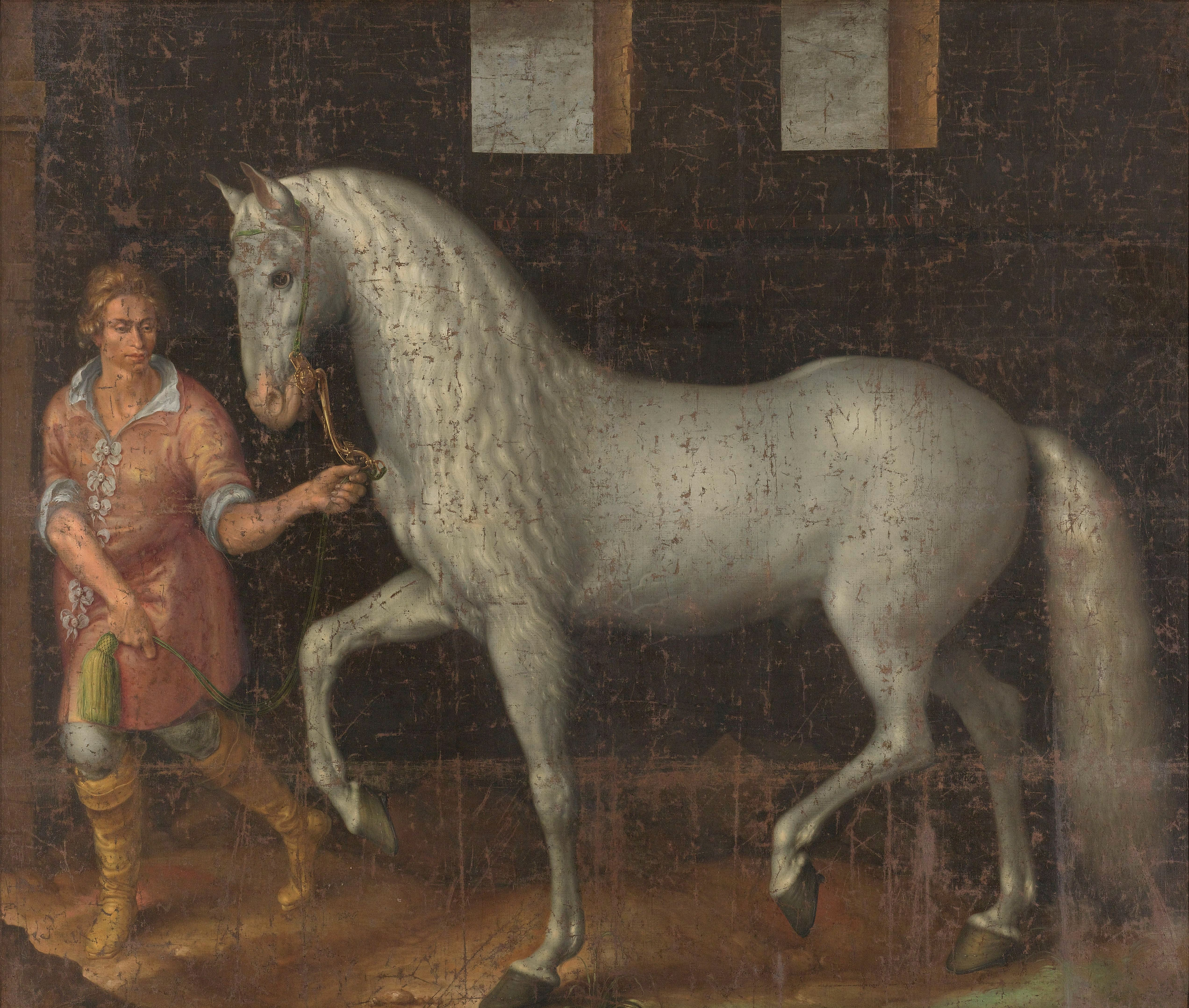
A 1603 painting of a Spanish war horse, an ancestor of the modern Lusitano

When the Umayyad Muslims invaded the Iberian peninsula in 711 AD, their invasion brought Barb horses, which were crossed with native Iberian horses. The cross between these two breeds produced a war horse superior even to the original Iberian horse, and it was this new type that the Conquistadors introduced to the Americas. Called the Iberian war horse, this ancestor of the Lusitano was used both on the battlefield and in major riding academies throughout Europe. Bullfighting on horseback and displays of high school dressage were common entertainment for the Portuguese gentry.

Mitochondrial DNA studies of the closely related modern Andalusian horse, compared to the Barb horse of North Africa, present convincing evidence that Barbs and Iberian horses crossed the Strait of Gibraltar in each direction, were crossbred with each other, and thus each influenced the other's maternal bloodlines. While Portuguese historian Ruy d'Andrade hypothesized that the ancient Sorraia breed was an ancestor of the Southern Iberian breeds, including the Lusitano, genetic studies using mitochondrial DNA show that the Sorraia is part of a genetic cluster that is largely separated from most Iberian breeds. One maternal lineage is shared with the Lusitano, however, Sorraia lineages in Iberian breeds are relatively recent, dating to the Middle Ages, making the Sorraia an unlikely prehistoric ancestor of the Lusitano.

Prior to modern times, horse breeds throughout Europe were known primarily by the name of the region where they were bred. The Lusitano takes its name from Lusitania, an ancient Roman name for the region that today is Portugal. A very similar horse, the Spanish Andalusian, originally described the horses of distinct quality that came from Andalusia in Spain. Some sources state that the Andalusian and the Lusitano are genetically the same breed, and the only difference is the country in which individual horses are born. The Lusitano is also known as the Portuguese, Peninsular, National or Betico-lusitano horse.

During the 16th and 17th centuries, horses moved continually between Spain and Portugal, and horses from the studs of Andalusia were used to improve the Portuguese cavalry. Portugal's successful restoration war against Spain (1640–1668) was in part based on mounted troops riding war horses of Spanish blood. During the reign of Philip III of Portugal (also Philip IV of Spain), Portuguese horse breeding reached its lowest point. The Spanish passed laws to halt the country's production of cavalry horses, and what stud farms did exist were run in secrecy with horses smuggled or stolen from Spain. These secret farms, however, provided the base for the modern Lusitano. In 1662, when Charles II of England married Catherine of Braganza of Portugal, the royal dowry included Portugal's Tangier and Bombay garrisons. These garrisons included large groups of Portuguese cavalry, mounted on Iberian horses.

Prior to the 1960s, the Iberian-type horse was called the Andalusian in both Portugal and Spain. In 1966, the Lusitano name was adopted by Portugal after a studbook separation by the two countries. The revolutions of Portugal's African colonies resulted in the near economic collapse of Portugal. The landed class attracted political agitators, estates were vacated, and stud farms were broken up and their horses sold to Spain. However, the best lines were saved through the efforts of breeders, and breeding soon increased. Today, Lusitanos are bred mainly in Portugal and Brazil, but maintain a presence in many other countries throughout the world, including Australia, the United States, Great Britain, South Africa, and other European countries. Crossbred horses of partial Lusitano blood are popular, especially when crossed with Andalusian, Arabian or Thoroughbred blood.

=== Strains and sub-types ===
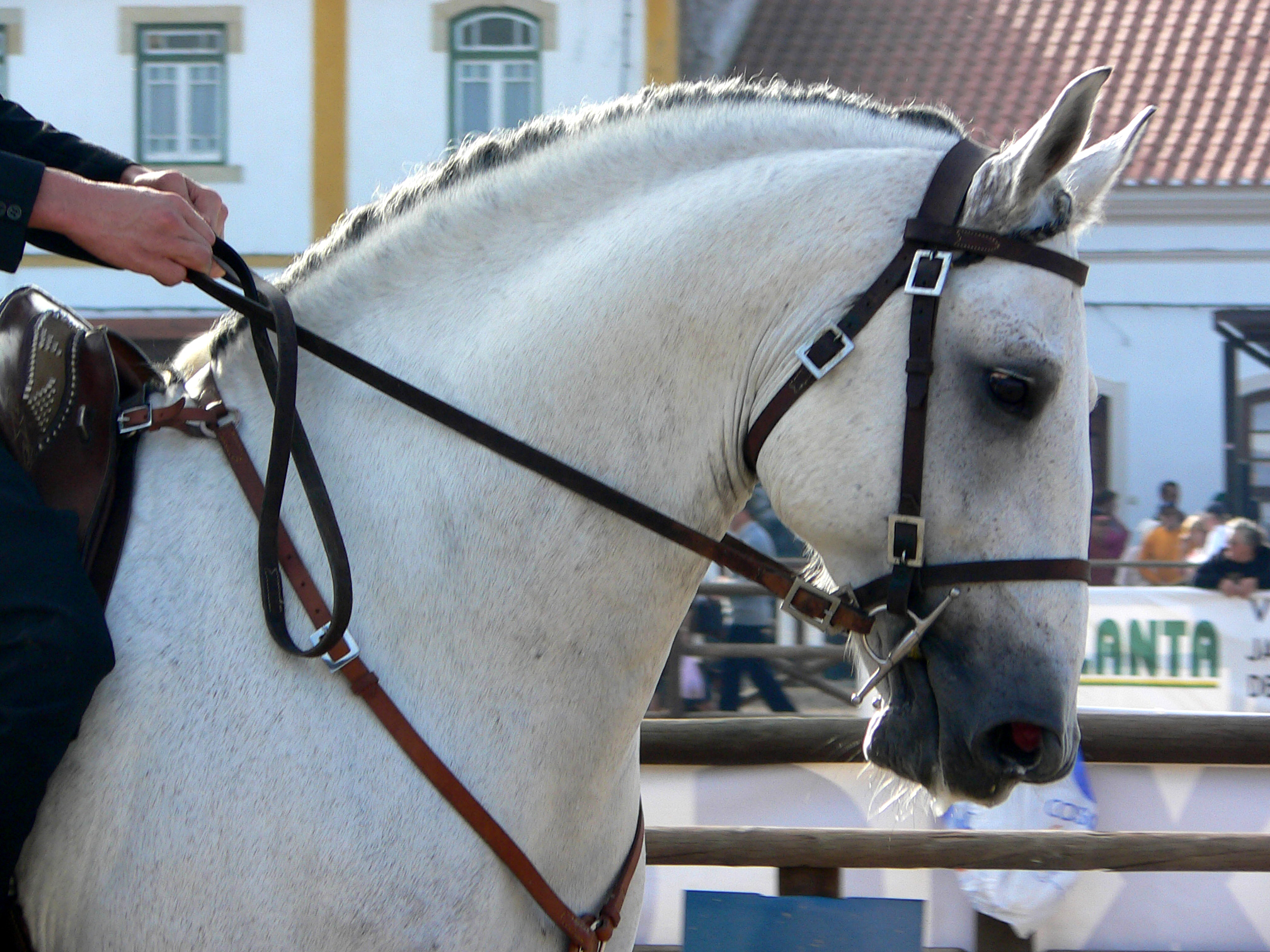
A modern Lusitano

The Portuguese stud book recognizes six horses (five stallions and one mare) that are called the "heads of lineage". These six horses are the foundation horses of the three main breed lineages: Andrade, Veiga and Coudelaria Nacional (Portuguese State Stud). Although each line meets breed standards, they differ from each other in individual characteristics. The six foundation horses are:

- Agareno, a 1931 Veiga stallion, out of Bagocha, by Lidador
- Primorosa, a 1927 Dominquez Hermanos stallion, out of Primorosa II, by Presumido
- Destinado, a 1930 Dominquez Hermanos stallion, out of Destinada, by Alegre II
- Marialva II, a 1930 Antonio Fontes Pereira de Melo stallion, out of Campina, by Marialva
- Regedor, a 1923 Alter Real stallion, out of Gavina, by Gavioto
- Hucharia, a 1943 Coudelaria Nacional mare, out of Viscaina, by Cartujano

=== Alter Real ===
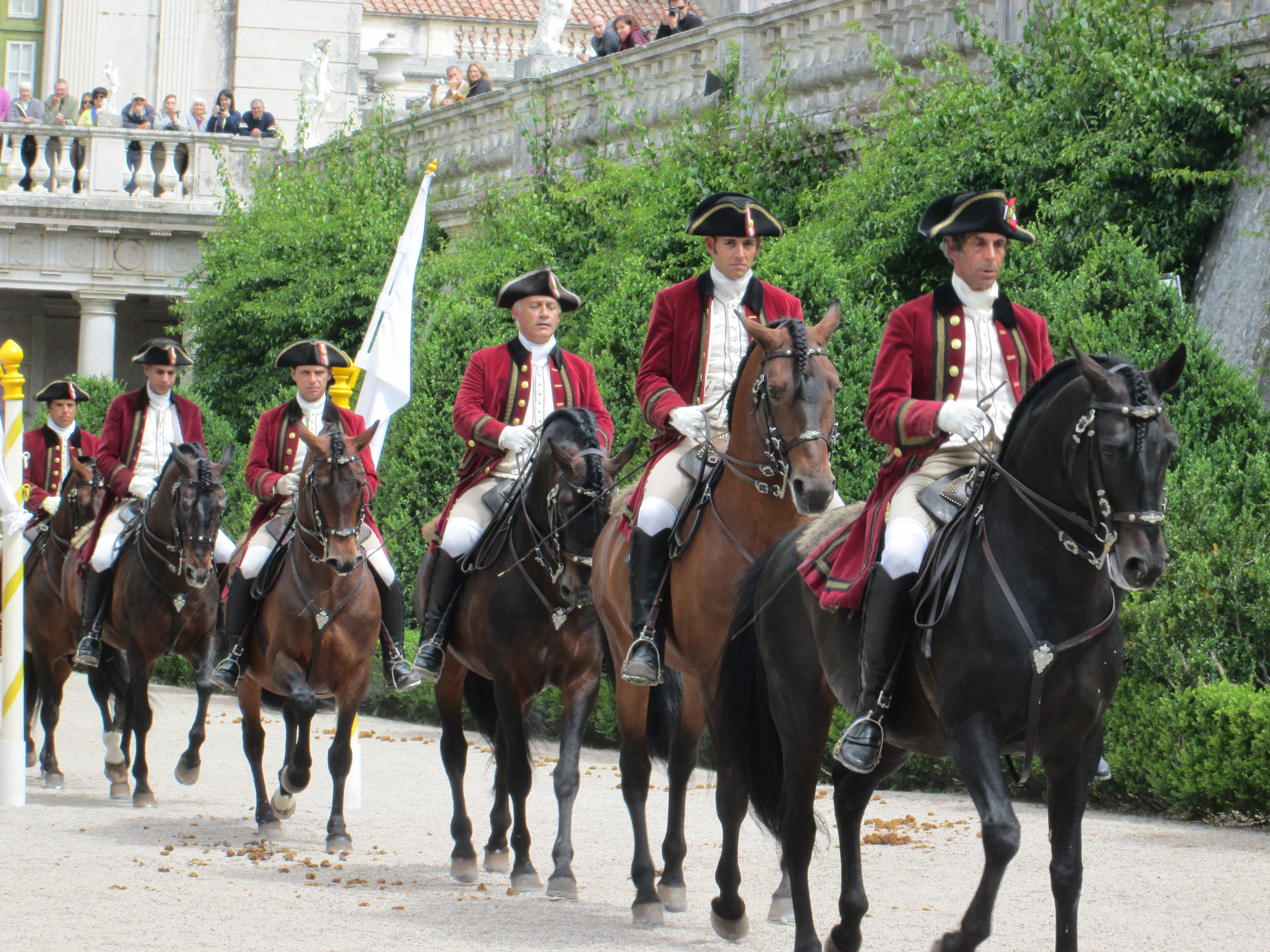
Alter Real horses of the Portuguese School of Equestrian Art

The Alter Real is a strain of the Lusitano which is bred only at the Alter Real State Stud in Portugal. The stud was founded in 1748 by the Portuguese royal family to provide horses for the national riding academy and royal use. The Portuguese School of Equestrian Art (Escola Portuguesa de Arte Equestre) uses these horses exclusively in their performances. The strain was developed from 300 Iberian mares imported from Spain in 1747. When Napoleon invaded Spain in the early 19th century, the Alter Real strain deteriorated due to the introduction of Arabian, Thoroughbred, Spanish-Norman and Hanoverian blood. However, in the 19th and 20th centuries the strain was re-established with the further introduction of Spanish blood.

In the early 20th century, with the 1910 revolution that ended the monarchy, the Alter Real strain faced extinction, as records were burned, stallions were gelded and the stud discontinued. Ruy d'Andrade, a specialist in Iberian horse breeds, saved two stallions and several mares, and was able to re-establish the strain, turning his herd over to the Portuguese Ministry of Agriculture in 1942, when the stud was reopened. The Portuguese state has maintained ownership of the stud, and continues to produce horses for use in high school dressage.

== Registration ==
Today, outside of Portugal and Spain, breeding, showing and registration of both Lusitanos and Andalusians are often closely linked. One example is the Australasian Lusitano Horse Association of Australasia (LHAA), which shares responsibility for the Purebred Iberian Horse (an Andalusian/Lusitano cross) with the Australasia Andalusian Association, as well as hosting a combined National Show for the two breeds in Australia. The LHAA was formed in 2003 to register and promote the Lusitano breed in Australia and New Zealand, and in June 2005 signed an agreement with their parent organization, the Portuguese Associação Portuguesa de Criadores do Cavalo Puro Sangue Lusitano, to follow that association's rules and regulations. The LHAA maintains two studbooks (for the purebred Lusitano and the purebred Iberian) and a crossbred registry for horses with one Lusitano parent. An example of a combined registry is the International Andalusian and Lusitano Horse Association (IALHA).

== Characteristics and uses ==
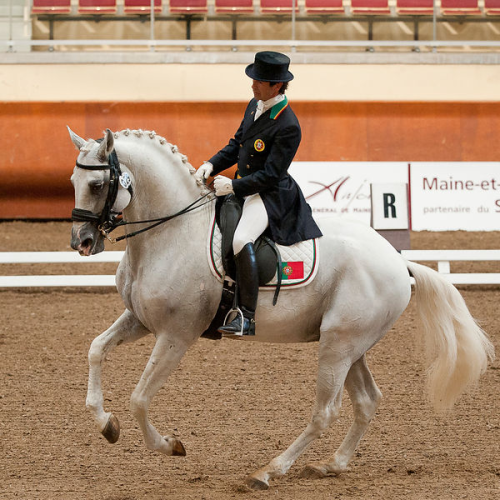
Soberano III, a Lusitano, competes in dressage

Lusitanos are generally gray, bay or chestnut, though they can be of any solid color, including black, buckskin and palomino. Only bays are bred at the Alter Real stud. They usually stand 15.2 and 15.3 hands (62 and 63 inches, 157 and 160 cm) high, although some stand over 16 hands (64 inches, 163 cm). Members of the breed have narrow, but well-proportioned, heads with profiles that are slightly convex. The necks are thick and arched, leading to well defined withers, shoulders that are muscular and sloping and a deep, broad chest. The horses have short, strong backs and rounded, sloped croups, leading to a low-set tail. The legs are sturdy and muscled. Lusitanos are known as powerful horses, noted for their intelligence and willing nature. The breed's gaits are agile and elevated, but generally comfortable to ride. The Lusitano differs from the Andalusian through having a more sloped croup, a lower-set tail, and a more convex head profile. The mane and tail are extremely thick in both breeds.

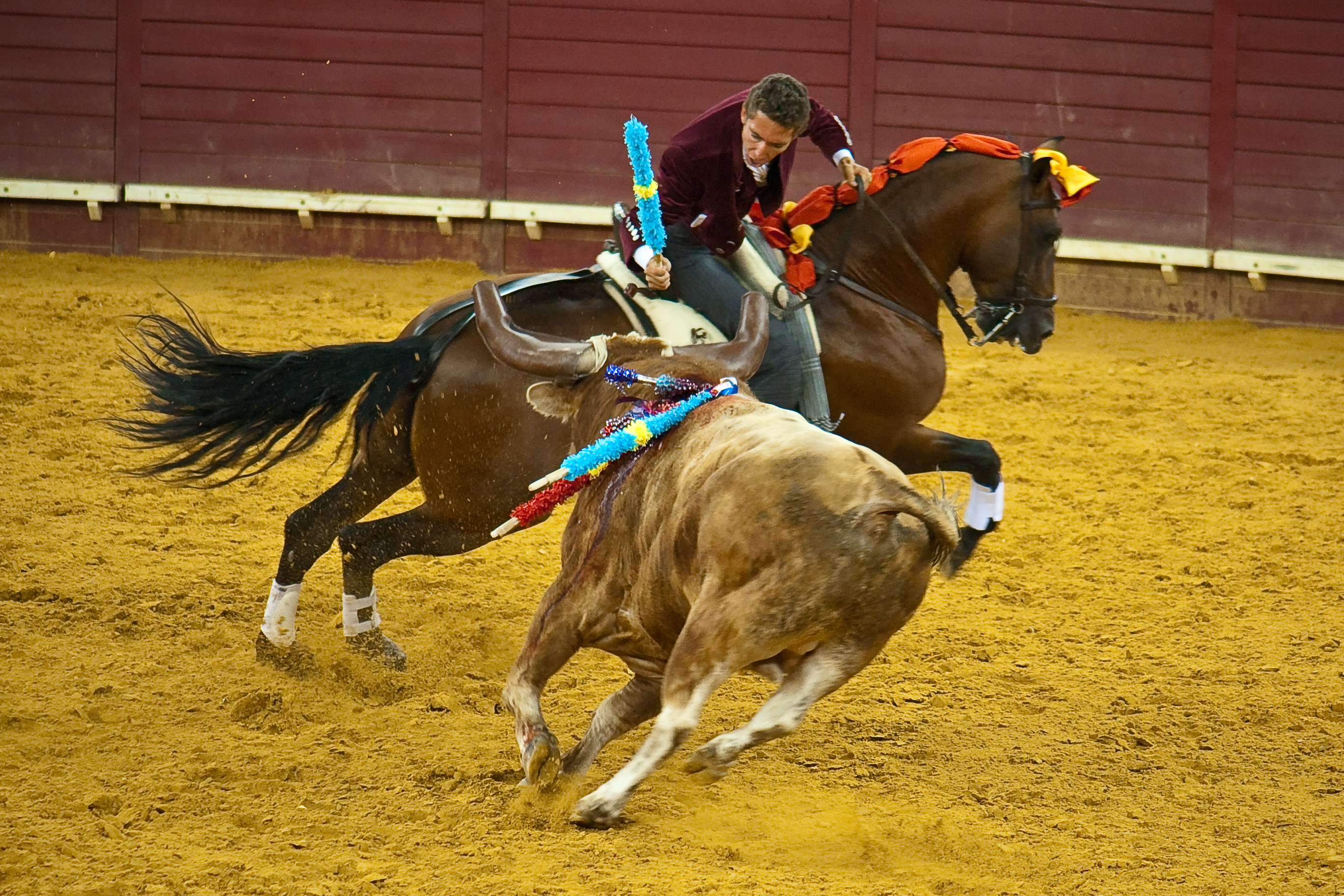
Lusitano in a bullfight

The ancestors of the Lusitano were originally used for classical dressage, driving and bullfighting on horseback. Today, Lusitanos are seen in internationdisciplines, including high-level combined driving competition. In 1995, a four-in-hand team driven by Belgian Felix Brasseur won the FEI Driving World Cup, and took the World Championships in 1996. In 2002, there was a Lusitano on the World Equestrian Games bronze-winning dressage team that went on to collect a silver medal at the 2004 Summer Olympics. In 2006, the entire Portuguese dressage team rode Lusitanos at the World Equestrian Games, as did one Spanish dressage competitor. The Belgian Brasseur took the gold medal in four-in-hand driving at the same competition with a team composed solely of Lusitanos.

They are still used for mounted bullfighting today, in a form where the bull is not killed and it is considered a disgrace to the rider if the horse is injured. Horses bred for this sport must be agile and calm, remaining in the control of the rider even when confronted by a bull. Between 1980 and 1987, Lusitanos were used for breeding Colorado Ranger horses, although these crosses are no longer allowed by the breed registry. An Alter Real stallion, taken to Brazil prior to Napoleon's invasion, was a foundation stallion of the Mangalarga Marchador breed.

== = Sources ==
- Bennett, Deb (1998). Conquerors: The Roots of New World Horsemanship (1st ed.). Solvang, CA: Amigo Publications Inc. ISBN 978-0-9658533-0-9.
- Bongianni, Maurizio, ed. (1988). Simon & Schuster's Guide to Horses and Ponies. New York, NY: Simon & Schuster, Inc. ISBN 978-0-671-66068-0.
- Draper, Judith (1998). The book of horses and horse care: an encyclopedia of horses, and a comprehensive guide to horse and pony care. Barnes & Noble. ISBN 978-0-7607-0714-2.
- Dutson, Judith (2005). Storey's Illustrated Guide to 96 Horse Breeds of North America. Storey Publishing. ISBN 978-1-58017-613-2.
- Edwards, Elwyn Hartley (1994). The Encyclopedia of the Horse (1st American ed.). New York, NY: Dorling Kindersley. ISBN 978-1-56458-614-8.
- Hendricks, Bonnie (2007). International Encyclopedia of Horse Breeds. University of Oklahoma Press. ISBN 978-0-8061-3884-8.
- Loch, Sylvia (1986). The Royal Horse of Europe: The Story of the Andalusian and Lusitano. London: J. A. Allen. ISBN 978-0-85131-422-8.
