= Belgian horse =

Belgian horse may refer to:

- American Belgian Draft, an American breed of horse
- Belgian Draught, a Belgian breed of heavy horse
- Belgian Sport Horse, a Belgian breed of warmblood horse
- Belgian Trotter, a Belgian breed of trotting horse
- Belgian Warmblood, a Belgian breed of warmblood horse
- Zangersheide, a Belgian breed of warmblood horse

== See also ==
- List of Belgian horse breeds
