= Horse cloning =

Equine cloning over the world

Horse cloning is the process of obtaining a horse with genes identical to that of another horse, using an artificial fertilization technique. Interest in this technique began in the 1980s. The Haflinger foal Prometea, the first living cloned horse, was obtained in 2003 in an Italian laboratory. Over the years, the technique has improved. It is mainly used on high-performance but castrated or infertile animals, for reproductive cloning. These horses are then used as breeding stock. Horse cloning is only mastered by a handful of laboratories worldwide, notably in France, Argentina, North America and China. The technique is limited by the fact that some differences remain between the original and its clone, due to the influence of mitochondrial DNA.

Reproductive cloning of the Pieraz and Quidam de Revel horses began in 2005. The International Federation for Equestrian Sports (FEI by its acronym in French) decided to ban clones from competition in 2007, before authorizing them in 2012. A few clones are used in equestrian sports, winning major titles such as the Argentine polo championship in 2013. Nevertheless, the number of cloned horses is growing every year. The practice is highly controversial, particularly for bioethical reasons, since it involves a high failure rate on embryos. It also raises questions about the management of horses' genetic diversity, the future of the horse breeding profession, and the outbreak of new genetic disorders or fraud.

The horse is the seventh species to be cloned yet.

== History ==
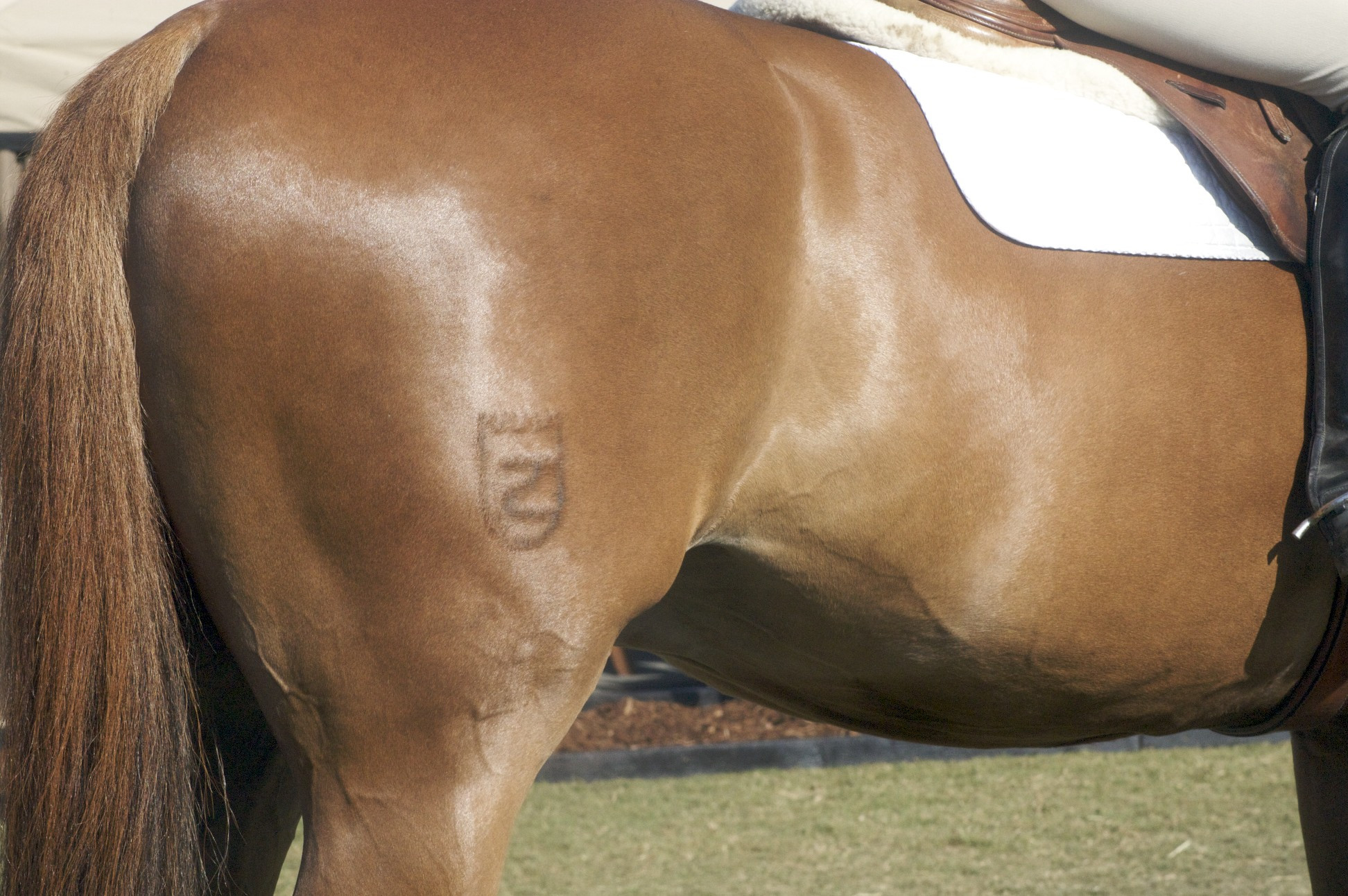
The Zangersheide stud farm (shown here with their branding) has been a driving force behind the development of horse cloning.

Horse cloning has undergone a rapid qualitative and quantitative evolution. While Italian professor Cesare Galli believes that horse cloning has aroused less interest than that of other large mammals, other scientists believe that the high commercial value attained by some horses has created immediate interest, unlike in the case of less valuable agricultural animal species. Equine cloning owes much of its development to the Belgian stud farm of Zangersheide, one of the pioneers of artificial insemination and embryo transfer. According to Éric Palmer, a French biologist specializing in horse reproduction (who introduced ultrasound to mares and produced the first foal by in vitro fertilization), the way for the use of cloning was initiated in the 1980s by veterinarian surgeon Dr. Leo de Backer. He was in contact with some of the world's leading sports stables. According to Palmer, the ones that are interested are Alwin Schockemöhle, Jan Tops, Thomas Fruhman, John and Michael Whitaker, Willi Melliger, Jean-Claude Van Geensbergen and La Silla (in Mexico), among many others. The value of cloning high lineage horses was recognized as early as 1998, with the Westhusin study. Research to this end was publicly announced in 2001. That same year, with the support of Genopole, Éric Palmer founded Cryozootech, a company dedicated to preserving the genes of horses with exceptional performance, with a view to future cloning. The horse is not the first large mammal to be cloned, as Dolly the sheep and other animals precede it, making it the seventh mammal to be cloned.

=== Birth of Prometea and Pieraz ===
The birth of three cloned mules in the United States on May 4, 2003, came just before that of the first horse. The first successful attempt to produce a viable clone was made by the Italian laboratory LTR-CIZ, which gave birth to Prometea on May 28, 2003, a Haflinger foal carried to term by her mother, whose genetic copy she is. Her birth was announced publicly on August 6, 2003. The name "Prometea" is the feminine form of Prometeo ("Prometheus" in Greek). These scientists worked under the guidance of Professor Cesare Galli.

Dr. Cesare Galli and others at the lab experimented with 841 reconstructed embryos; of the 14 viable embryos, four were implanted in surrogate mothers - only that of Prometea succeeded in being born. Prometea was born to her twin mother who her cloning cells originated from. Texas A&M University was also undertaking a horse-cloning project when the Italian team first succeeded.

In 2002, LTR-CIZ merged with Cryozootech. In Italy, they produced the world's second cloned horse, Pieraz-Cryozootech-Stallion. This is a purely commercial clone, aimed at obtaining a fertile genetic copy of a successful but castrated horse. According to Bernard Debré, the birth of Pieraz-étalon heralded the commercial direction that equine cloning would later take. Prometea and Pieraz were obtained using the same method, that of Professor Galli.

=== Entering the commercial phase ===
Shortly afterwards, on 13 March 2005, Dr Katrin Hinrichs gave birth to Paris-Texas, a clone of Quidam de Revel, in a laboratory at Texas A&M University in Texas (USA). The clone foal is also produced commercially for breeding purposes, at the request of Quidam's owner. The technique used is slightly different from that of the Italians. As a result, the number of clones produced has increased over the years. In 2009, the E.T. FRH clone became the first cloned show jumping horse authorized for breeding by a studbook (the Zangersheide studbook), while endurance champion Pieraz's clone entered its third breeding season. In Argentina, polo player Adolfo Cambiaso uses Crestview Genetics to clone his polo ponies. At the end of 2010, a clone of his polo mare Cuartetera was sold at auction for a record $800,000. In May 2013, a non-clone foal was born for the first time from two parents cloned by embryo transfer. On 7 December 2013, a cloned polo pony won a major sporting competition for the first time. It was the Argentine polo championship. In 2018, equine cloning was widely used in Argentina's polo scene. The Argentine polo horse has become the most cloned animal in the world.

== Technique ==
Cloning research is often carried out in secret, due to poor public acceptance. Commercial cloning companies sometimes reveal the births of these horses, but the techniques employed remain mostly secret. According to the French national stud farm, the cloning technique used, known as "somatic" cloning, involves taking cells by biopsy, usually from the breast of an adult animal. Fibroblasts are extracted and cultured in vitro until a sufficient number is obtained, then stored in liquid nitrogen. Oocytes are harvested from a mare, either living or dead. The DNA is removed by enucleation, then in vitro culture makes it suitable for receiving fibroblast DNA from the animal to be cloned. Due to the high demand for mare oocytes, these are usually obtained from slaughterhouses.

After a week or so of in vitro culture, the resulting embryo is implanted into the uterus of a carrier mare, using the embryo transfer technique. After eleven months' gestation, the mare gives birth to the cloned foal. However, this type of gestation is much riskier than a conventional one.

=== Success rate ===
According to a Belgian researcher interviewed by Le Vif, the failure rate is the main reason for opposition to cloning, for bioethical reasons due to the mortality of embryos, fetuses and newborn foals. This rate is high, but is gradually decreasing thanks to better-controlled techniques. Professor Galli obtained 15% viable embryos for his second clone, Pieraz, compared with only 3% for Prometea, the first horse, which required 328 attempts. The first mule trials, in 2003, involved 118 embryos, 13 of which produced a gestation, resulting in 3 live mules. To clone Calvaro V in 2006, Cryozootech used over 2,000 oocytes, which produced 22 embryos, only one of which was carried to term.

Estimates of this rate vary from source to source. In 2012, according to a Belgian researcher, the average success rate for animal cloning was around 5%. Argentine researchers estimate that 6 or 7 embryos are needed out of 20 trials (in 2013). In 2010, according to a French source, around 2,500 mare oocytes had to be used to obtain a single viable foal. There are many abortions as well. Despite increased susceptibility to neonatal disease, a clone has the same life expectancy and robustness as a conventional horse. There is nothing to differentiate a clone from a conventionally bred horse.

=== Usage ===
The cost of equine cloning varies between €200,000 and €300,000, depending on the source. In 2010, clones intended for sporting competitions represented just 22% of operations. Cloning is therefore mainly carried out in Europe for the purpose of breeding high-performance horses. A gelding can be copied to ensure its progeny. The same applies to a stallion that has become too old to reproduce, or to a mare whose number of foals is naturally limited. The use of cloning relies heavily on the belief that DNA is the most important factor in competition performance. Anne Ricard's study estimates that, in equestrian disciplines (show jumping, dressage and endurance) where geldings represent around 40% of competitors, the use of reproductive clones will enable a genetic improvement of 4% per generation. Once their fertility has been established, their semen is frozen as for any other stallion.

Effective cloning remains very marginal due to its cost. In the US and Argentina, requests for equine cloning come mainly from polo players (who allow their mares to play all the seasons) and Arabian horse breeders. Cloning can also be used to preserve rare breeds threatened with extinction, but customers' motivations are essentially commercial. Nevertheless, the discovery of a perfectly preserved prehistoric foal in Siberia (in 2018) augurs well for cloning trials by Russian and Korean researchers, to resurrect extinct equine breeds or species. The foal's DNA matched the Lena horse (Equus lenensis), which went extinct around 5,000 years ago.

After the last Abaco Barb, a mare named Nunki, died in 2015, her cells were frozen for cloning purposes. In 2017, Viagen and other partners pledged services valued at approximately $2 million to support the project. Viagen nurtured enough genetic material to create two clones of Nunki, but it is unclear if the project was successful. One of the main issues with the Abaco Barb was inbreeding, with a population of 30 horses descended from just three individuals noted in 1992, and no new foals were born after 1999. The Wild Horses of Abaco Preservation Society, the nonprofit that manages the cloning project, proposed crossing Nunki's clones with selected Spanish Mustang or Colonial Spanish Horse stallions to revive the breed, as well as add genetic diversity.

=== Limits ===
If the foal is the genetic copy of its donor, the question of the influence of the mitochondria that remain present in the recipient oocyte is still open. Mitochondria represent only 1 or 2% of the genome, but could influence the clone's sporting performance. They are more important in the case of a mare than a stallion, since the mare transmits her mitochondria during reproduction, unlike the stallion. Similarly, the cloned horse is not necessarily a perfect copy of the donor in terms of phenotype and character. The horse markings may vary, and the character, depending less on genetics than on the influence of the mother and upbringing, may also turn out to be very different. The technique also has its limits when it comes to breeding, as the pattern sought in horses evolves over time. There is therefore little point in cloning a horse clone. It also takes a long time to implement, and the number of specialized laboratories and companies is limited. The Kheiron company in Argentina, for example, estimates its waiting time at eighteen years, with demand far outstripping supply. The ban on clones in a large number of stud books and in certain competitions also limits interest.

== Specialized companies ==
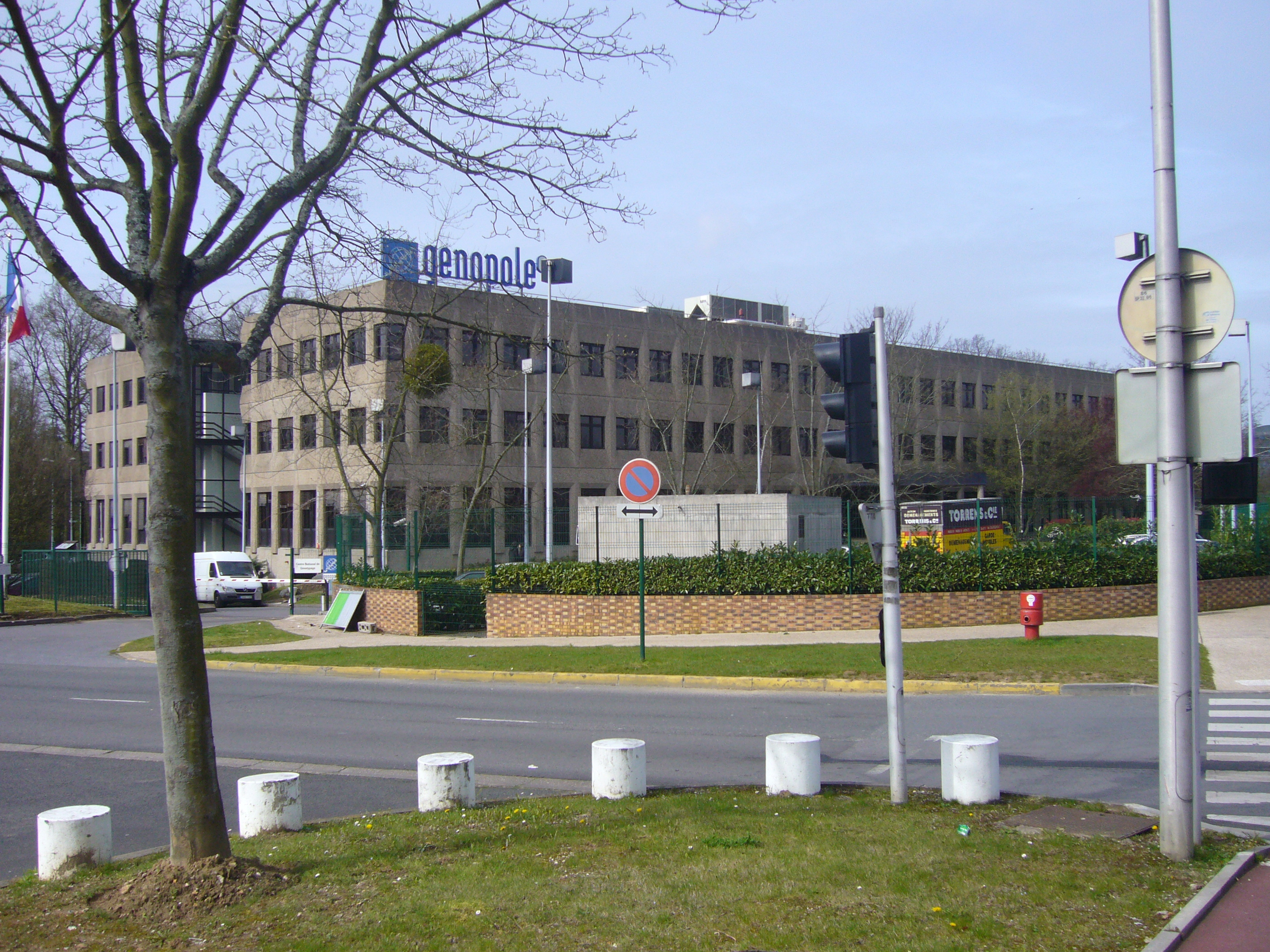
Genopole d'Évry supported the creation of Cryozootech, France's first commercial horse cloning company.

A few companies are known for their specialization in commercial equine cloning: Viagen, Replica Farms, Crestview Genetics, Kheiron and Cryozootech. Competition between these laboratories is fierce. French company Cryozootech is a pioneer in the field, having produced the first commercial clone in 2005. It has made the production of famous horse clones its specialty. Viagen was originally based in Texas in the United States, but the laboratory moved to Canada after the last American slaughterhouses closed in 2007, to source mare oocytes. Kheiron was set up in Argentina in 2009 with a team of eight people. Equine cloning has developed strongly in this country, thanks in particular to demand from polo players, the profusion of mare oocytes available for research (the country exports a lot of horse meat, and has numerous slaughterhouses supplying oocytes) and the easy breeding conditions in the Pampas. In 2012, Argentina was estimated to be the country producing the most horse clones in the world. In Texas, more than 900 clones were born between the creation of the first laboratory and 2014. In 2019, equine cloning companies are expected to open in China.

Cloning laboratories
Laboratory	Country	Creation date	Number of clones	Sources
Cryozootech	France	2001 (2005 for cloning activity)	28 (2001 – January 2014)	
Viagen	Texas, USA Canada since 2007	January 2002	World leader in equine cloning in North America	
Crestview Genetics	USA Argentina	2009	70 (creation – December 2013), capacity from 20 to 30 each year	
Kheiron	Argentina	2009	Capacity of 10 to 20 each year	
Replica Farms	USA Canada	2005		

== Reception in competitions and breeding registers ==
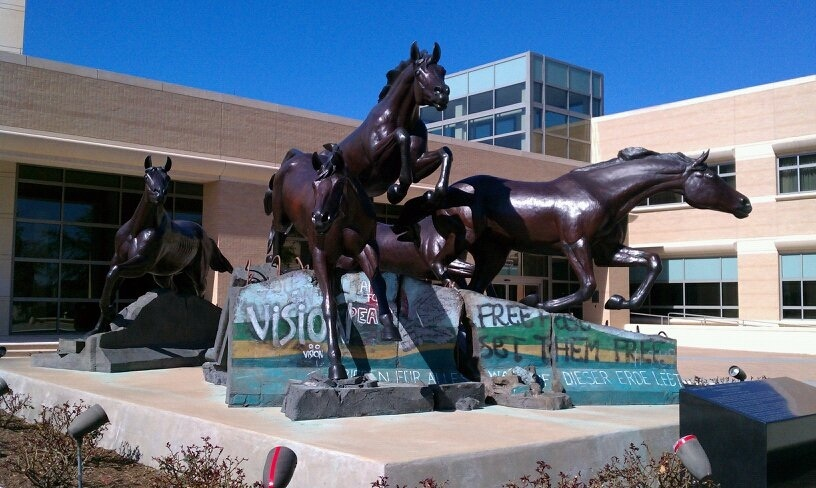
Allegory of the triumph of capitalism over communism at Texas A&M University, the first research institution on the American continent to successfully clone a horse.

The use of clones for the genetic improvement of horses' sporting performance is recognized, including by veterinarians, although skepticism remains high among some professionals. According to Éric Palmer, acceptance of horse cloning is growing, and attitudes are changing, in the same way as the gradual acceptance of in vitro fertilization and artificial insemination techniques in horses. Fears of the birth of malformed or monstrous animals diminished when clone owners realized that their animals were in good health.

=== Competitions ===
In 2007, the International Federation for Equestrian Sports ruled that cloned horses should be banned from the official competitions it organizes, believing that opening up participation to clones would be unjust and unfair to the competition. It revised its opinion in July 2012. Horse clones are now allowed in all FEI competitions. This reversal is seen as an important sign of recognition of the usefulness of clones in sport horse breeding.

In the United States, the National Cutting Horse Association and the National Barrel Horse Association allow clones in cutting and barrel racing competitions. The American Quarter Horse Association was taken to court by owners and riders of cloned horses in 2012, for refusing to allow these horses to take part in official breed competitions. The initial ruling ordered the association to amend its bylaws to allow clones to compete. A 2015 court ruling from the U.S. Court of Appeals for the Fifth Circuit overturned the lower court's decision that would have required the AQHA to register clones.

Training of certain clones - such as Sjors HF, clone of Sagacious HF, who qualified for the 2012 U.S. Dressage Championships and selection for the 2012 London Olympics - makes it possible for a clone horse to compete in the Olympics in the future. Kastel's Nintendo, ridden by Charlotte Jorst, was shortlisted for the U.S. Dressage Olympic team (including for the 2020 Tokyo Olympics and 2024 Paris Olympics), but the pair ultimately never qualified for, nor competed in, the Olympics. Jorst began aiming for future Olympics with younger prospects, including Nintendo's three clones. However, long-term programs beyond the 2028 Los Angeles Olympics, including equestrian sports, are subject to ongoing review by the International Olympic Committee (IOC).

=== Studbook entries ===
Clones are generally not entered in the stud books of their respective breeds. The American Jockey Club refuses to allow cloned horses to race. In France, clones are also banned from trotting and galloping races. Several European sport horse and warmblood studbooks accept clones: Zangersheide; Anglo-European (AES); Irish Sport Horse (ISH); Dutch Warmblood (KWPN); Belgian Warmblood (BWP); and Holsteiner. France's national stud farms advise against banning clones from the various studbooks, arguing that this will ultimately drive the best gene pool abroad.

== Cloned horses ==
The existence of clones is not always made public, due to the poor reception they receive. Although in Belgium, Isabelle Donnay believes that commercial cloning of horses has not been very successful, on a global scale, their numbers have clearly increased over time. Equidia Life's 2013 survey describes the practice as "booming". In winter 2010, 56 clones were counted worldwide, produced by laboratories in Europe, the United States and South America. Americans clone more mares than Europeans. Between 2006 and 2011, at least 20 American Quarter Horses were cloned. In 2014, there were an estimated 900 clones in the state of Texas. In Europe, the Belgian Zangersheide stable regularly uses this technique, with four horses cloned between 2006 and 2013. The stallion Salute, one of Smart Little Lena's clones, was exported to Australia in 2010 for breeding.

Cloned horses
Cloned horse (breed)	Name of the clone(s)	Laboratory	Date of birth	Sources
Stella Cometa (Haflinger)	Prometea	Prof. Galli Cesare, LTR-CIZ, Italy	28 May 2003	
Pieraz (Arabian)	Pieraz-Cryozootech-Stallion	Prof. Galli Cesare, LTR-CIZ, Italy Dr. Éric Palmer, Cryozootech, France	26 February 2005	
Quidam de Revel (Selle Français)	Paris-Texas	Dr. Katrin Hinrichs, Texas A&MUniversity, USA Dr. Éric Palmer, Cryozootech, France	13 March 2005	
Royal Blue Boon (Quarter Horse)	–	Replica Farms, USA	19 February 2006	
E.T. FRH (Hanoverian)	E.T.-Cryozootech-Stallion	Cryozootech, France	2 June 2006	
Scamper (Quarter Horse)	Clayton	Viagen, USA	8 August 2006	
Smart Little Lena (Quarter Horse)	Thirteen clones since 2006, including the stallion Salute	Dr. Katrin Hinrichs, Texas A&M University, USA	2006	
Poetin (Brandenburger)	Poetin Z CL (Zangersheide) Poetin II Z (Zangersheide)	Cryozootech, France	30 March 2007	
Chellano Z (Zangersheide)	–	Cryozootech, France	25 July 2008	
435 Airwolf	Wolfie	Viagen, USA	4 August 2008	
Gem Twist (Thoroughbred)	Gemini CL Murka's Gem Gem Twist Alpha Z (Zangersheide)	Cryozootech, France	15 September 2008 2011 July 2012	
Calvaro V (Holsteiner)	Calvaro-Cryozootech-Stallion	Cryozootech, France	July 2006 (stillborn foal) 2008 (success)	
Ratina Z (Hanoverian)	Ratina Z Alpha (Zangersheide) Ratina Z Beta (Zangersheide) Ratina Z Gamma (Zangersheide)	Cryozootech, France	2009	
Air Jordan Z (Oldenburg)	Air Jordan Alpha Z (Zangersheide)		April 2009	
Levisto Z (Holsteiner)	Levisto Alpha Z (Zangersheide)		May 2009	
Sapphire (Holsteiner)	Saphir	Replica Farms, USA	11 February 2010	
Top Gun La Silla (Hanoverian)	Top Gun Cryozootech	Cryozootech, France	16 March 2010	
–	Nandubay Bicentenario South America's first cloned horse	Bio Sidus, Argentina	2010	
Cuartetera (Polo pony)	At least twelve clones numbered B01-B12; other clones codenamed CF Symphony, CF Pantera	Crestview Genetics, USA	2010	
Frenchmans Guy (Quarter Horse)	Three clones	Viagen, Canada	Spring, 2011	
Zandor Z (Rhenish Warmblood)	Zandor Alpha Z (Zangersheide)		Born in November 2011, existence revealed in February 2012	
Jazz (Dutch Warmblood)	Hollywood Jazz Clone 2	Cryozootech, France	2012	
Rusty (Letton)	Two clones	Cryozootech, France	Born in 2012, existence revealed in 2013	
Tamarillo (Anglo-Arabian)	Tomatillo	Replica Farms, USA	Existence revealed in 2013	
Cruising (Irish Sport Horse)	Cruising Arish Cruising Encore		Born in 2012, existence revealed in 2015	
Otterongo Z (Zangersheide)	Otterongo Alpha Z		2014	
Storm Cat (Thoroughbred)	Two clones	Crestview Genetics, USA	Born in April 2015, existence revealed in July 2015	
As Cold As Ice Z (Zangersheide)	As Cold As Ice Alpha As Cold As Ice Beta		2015	
Cocaine Z (Zangersheide)	Cocaine Alpha Z Cocaine Beta Z		2015 2016	
Cumano (Holsteiner)	Cumano Alpha Z (Zangersheide)		2017 (died on 23 September 2023 from inguinal hernia complications)	
Chilli Morning (Brandenburger)	Chilli Morning II (Deuce) Chilli Morning III (Trey) Chilli Morning IV (Quattro)	Viagen, USA	2017	
Topofthemarket (Quarter Horse)	Little Topper	Viagen, USA	2020	
Pacino (Belgian Warmblood)	Pacino II		Born in 2020, existence revealed in 2023	
Arko III (Oldenburg)	–	Viagen, USA, Gemini Genetics	August 2021	
Kastel's Nintendo (Dutch Warmblood)	Super Nintendo Nintendo Switch Nintendo 64		9 May 2022	
Zhaplin Langholt (Dutch Warmblood)	Stairway to Heaven Led Zhaplin		May 2022	
Sagacious HF (Dutch Warmblood)	Sjors HF	Viagen, USA	20 June 2022	
Anton 343 (Friesian)	Antonius	Viagen, USA	2024	
Bohemian (Westphalian)	–	Viagen, USA	2025	
Wodan M (Dutch Warmblood)	Wodan M Alpha	Estonian University of Life Sciences, Estonia	11 April 2026	

== Opposition ==
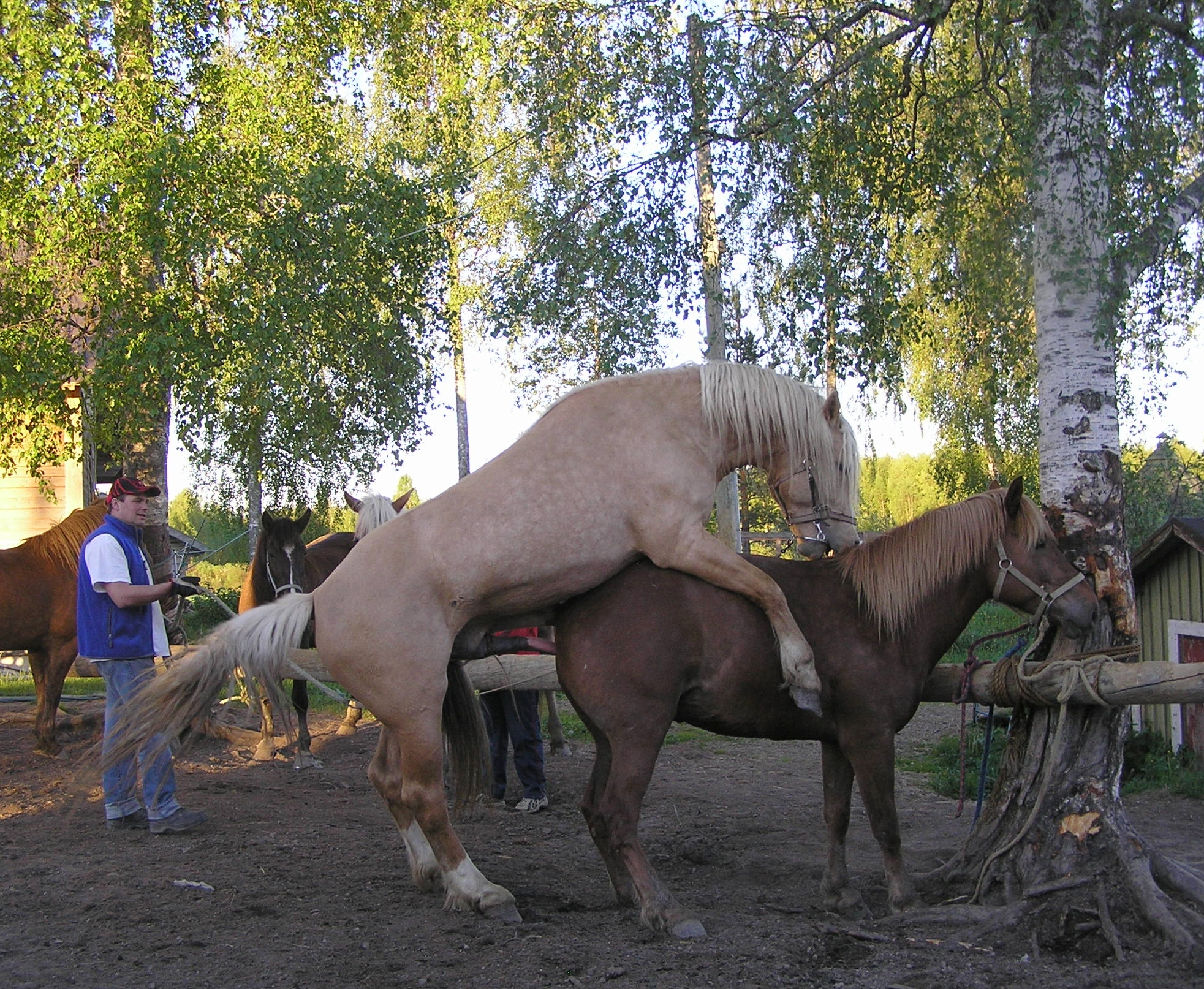
One of the fears introduced by cloning is that it will jeopardize traditional horse breeding and reproduction techniques.

According to various surveys, including one carried out by Cheval Savoir in 2009, horse cloning is generally poorly accepted by riders and horse professionals. They believe it introduces unfair competition to "normal" horse breeders, while constituting a highly lucrative and ethically unacceptable activity. For French scientist Éric Palmer, the technique is demonized due to misunderstandings. The American Quarter Horse Association has stated that "[...] clones have no parents, cloning is not breeding. It's just photocopies of the same horse", pointing to its low success rate and the risk of as yet unknown genetic disorder developing. The Jockey Club was also strongly opposed. Dr. Thomas Reed, who owns the private stud Morningside in Ireland, is also publicly opposed to cloning after the accidental death of his stallion Hickstead in competition at the end of 2011.

In 2015, the European Union voted to ban the cloning of farm animals (cattle, pigs, sheep, goats, and horses), and the sale of cloned livestock, their offspring, and products derived from them, such as meat and milk. The ban excluded cloning for research, and for the conservation of rare breeds and endangered species. However, no law was passed after the vote. As of 2024, horse cloning continues to be legal in the EU, with the Zangersheide registry in Belgium offering three cloned stallions for breeding.

=== Bioethics ===
Horse cloning, like that of other animal species, raises bioethical issues, since it involves a high mortality rate of embryos, fetuses and young foals. The Swiss National Stud's ethics study reports "massive loss during gestation", with less than 1% of oocytes obtained resulting in a live foal. Furthermore, foals born from cloning suffer from frequent health problems. An American study looked at 14 clones born between 2004 and 2008. Six (43%) were normal, while the other eight suffered from neonatal disorders, umbilical problems and limb deformities. There are a large number of stillborn foals, deaths in the first few days after birth, immune deficiencies, and muscle and bone deformities. Problems at foaling are common for both carrier mare and foal, with cesarean section being a common option. If foals survive their postnatal period, they do not appear to be more susceptible to disease thereafter. The question of their longevity remains unknown, as the first clones are still too young to draw any statistics.

In the UK, researcher William (Twink) Allen was refused permission to continue his cloning trials in 2004 for these ethical reasons, as the cloned animals could present malformations, anomalies and diseases, according to the British authorities. Dr. Natasha Lane, of the Society for the Prevention of Cruelty to Animals (SPCA by its acronym in French), said it was not acceptable to clone animals by sacrificing embryos "just to get a gold medal". Allen spoke out against the decision, saying that the British government had "caved in to the animal protection lobby".

=== Loss of genetic diversity and confiscation of living matter ===
Although horses are not threatened with extinction or other major problem now, cloning may create less genetic diversity among horses by using these horses to breed. This increases the life time of one breeding set of genetics resulting in less variability in a population. In conservation biology, there are concerns related to the lack of genetic diversity that allows for continuation of the species through genetic variation.

On 8 June 2005, a number of French farmers belonging to the Confédération Paysanne demonstrated in front of the Genopole d'Évry, Cryozootech's headquarters, to denounce the "seizure of living matter" and a future loss of genetic diversity, arguing that the development of cloning will eventually lead to the disappearance of the breeding profession. A number of specialists warn against the widespread use of cloning, believing that it will seriously damage the equine breeding industry, particularly in equestrian sport, by reducing demand for naturally-born foals. Cloning would also drastically reduce genetic diversity, as the same genes "could be reproduced over and over again".

=== Fraud ===
One fear that has arisen with cloning is that of new forms of fraud. In studbooks that refuse to accept clones, particularly the Thoroughbred studbook, it would be possible to pass off a horse cloned from a champion as another animal by falsifying its identification documents.

== See also ==
- Horse castration
- Equine Ethics

== Bibliography ==
- Poncet, Pierre-André; Bachmann, Iris; Burger, Dominik (2011). Réflexions éthiques face au cheval – Approche éthique des décisions à prendre pour bien faire ou éviter de faire mal (in French). Avenches: Rapport de l’Observatoire de la filière suisse du cheval.
- McLaren, Anne (2002). Le clonage. Regard éthique (in French). Vol. 2. Council of Europe. ISBN 9287147019.
- Couroucé-Malblanc, Anne (2010). "Clonage". Maladies des chevaux (in French). France Agricole Editions. ISBN 978-2855571683.
- Galli, Cesare; Lagutina, Irina; Duchi, Roberto; Colleoni, Silvia; Lazari, Giovanna (2013). "Cloning of equines". Principles of Cloning (2nd ed.). Academic Press. ISBN 978-0123865427.
- Bataille, Laetitia; Tavernier, Luc (2009). Clonage du cheval : faisons le point (in French) (2nd ed.). Cheval Savoir.
- Buschert, Deanna (2012). Cloning : The next generation. Australia: Western Horse Review.
- Tsaag, Amélie (2014b). Clonage du cheval : révolution et évolutions (in French). Cheval Savoir.
- Perrin-Debock, Wareen (2016). Clonage, la nouvelle arme pour gagner (Television production) (in French).
- Caillaud, M.; Reis, Paula; Palmer, Éric (May 2013). "Le clonage chez les équidés". Les Haras Nationaux. HN.
- Reis, Paula; Palmer, Éric (2010). "L'insertion des clones dans l'élevage équin : attentes et enseignements du marché". Equ'Idée.
- Perrin-Debock, Kareen (14 June 2013). "Clonage, la nouvelle arme pour gagner" (PDF) (Production de télévision) (in French). France: Equidia Life, coproduction TGA production. Extract.
