= List of Belgian horse breeds =

This is a list of the horse breeds considered in Belgium to be wholly or partly of Belgian origin, with some of the names used for them in that country:

Dutch	French	English name if used	Notes	Image
Ardenner Trekpaard	Cheval de Trait Ardennais	Ardennais		
Belgische Draver	Trotteur Belge	Belgian Trotter		
Belgische Rijpony	Poney de Selle Belge	Belgian Riding Pony		
Belgisch Sportpaard	Cheval de Sport Belge	Belgian Sport Horse		
Belgisch Trekpaard	Cheval de Trait Belge; Belge; Brabançon; Brabant; Trait lourd belge	Belgian Draught		
Belgisch Warmbloedpaard	Cheval de Sang Belge	Belgian Warmblood		
Vlaams Paard		Flemish Horse		
Zangersheide				
