= Quidam de Revel =

Named show jumping horse from France

- Breed: Selle Français
- Sire: Jalisco B
- Dam: Dirka
- Sex: Male
- Foaled: Antinea III (d) Guidam (d) Nabab de Rêve Dollar de la Pierre French Cancan, Quite Easy I, Hurlevent de Brekka, Quaprice Bois Margot, Le Prestige St-Lois, Luigi d'Amaury, Ouessant de Perhet, Verdi TN N.O.P., Rahotep de Toscane, and Quel Homme de Hus; Balleroy
- Died: 2013
- Color: Bay

Quidam de Revel (January 27, 1982, at Balleroy – between 2012 and 2014), was a Selle Français bay show jumping stallion, son of Jalisco B and Dirka. He was spotted by Fernand Leredde's stud. He made a name for himself in competition in the early 1990s with Hervé Godignon, and with his performances at the Barcelona Olympic Games in 1992. Sold to Denmark the same year, he competed at a lower level and made a career as a breeding stallion. Quidam sired numerous international champions, including Nabab de Rêve, Dollar de la Pierre, Quantum and Quaprice Bois Margot. He died of old age at an unknown date, between 2012 and 2014. He is cloned twice.

== History ==
Quidam de Revel was born on January 27, 1982, at Prince Amaury de Broglie's Balleroy stud. The famous year of the "Qs", 1982, was a banner year for Selle Français breeding, seeing the birth of many other champions of the breed, such as Quito de Baussy, Quat'Sous, Quinta C, Quick Star and Quel type d'Elle.

Quidam de Revel is bred and spotted by Fernand Leredde, who runs the Haras des Rouges. Hervé Godignon rode the young stallion in show jumping in the early 1990s. The pair finished sixth at the European Championships in La Baule, and won the Grand Prix and Nations Cup in Rome. In 1992, he took part in the team bronze medal at the Barcelona Olympic Games and finished fourth individually. That same year, Quidam was sold to the Danish Flemming Velin, who entrusted him to his children Charlotte and Thomas. He then competed at a lower level, finishing fifth at the European Young Riders Championships in Klagenfurt Messehalle in 1996, and taking part in the European Senior Championships in Mannheim in 1997 with Thomas Velin. He then retired from sport. The news of his death was not confirmed to Grand Prix magazine until February 2014.

== Sire line tree ==
- Quidam de Revel
  - Guidam
    - Luidam
    - Authentic
    - Ninja La Silla
    - Vindicat
  - Belsedène d’Amaury
  - Nabab de Reve
    - Kashmir van Schuttershof
      - Rêveur de Hurtebise
      - H&M All In
    - Vigo d'Arsouilles
      - Super Trooper de Ness
      - Denver van het Goemanshof
      - Dixon
      - Ego van Orti
      - Golden Hawk (Figo de Muze)
      - Vagabond de la Pomme
    - Winsome van dee Plataan
    - Bacardi van’t Lambroeck
    - Colombo van den Blauwaert
    - Couscous van Orti
    - London
    - Ensor de Litrange
    - Glasgow-W Van het Merelsnest
    - Cheyenne de la Violle
  - Darios V
  - Diabolo du Parc
  - Dollars Boy
  - Tlaloc La Silla
  - Eyken des Fontenis
  - Happy Villiers
  - Hermès St Lois
  - Huppydam des Horts
  - Quinar Z
  - Jadis de Toscane
  - Quaprice de Bois Margot
  - Quasimodo Z
  - Quidams Rubin
  - Verde TN
  - Paris-Texas
  - Sterrehof’s Calimero

== Origins ==
Quidam has excellent origins, being out of Jalisco B and Dirka, by Nankin, and Ondine de Baugy, by the thoroughbred Harphortas.

Pedigree of Quidam de Revel (1982-2013)
Sire Jalisco B (1975-1994)	Almé Z (1966-1991)	Ibrahim (1952-1973)	The Last Orange (1941)
Sire Jalisco B (1975-1994)	Almé Z (1966-1991)	Ibrahim (1952-1973)	Vaillante (1943)
Sire Jalisco B (1975-1994)	Almé Z (1966-1991)	Girondine (1950)	Ultimate (1941)
Sire Jalisco B (1975-1994)	Almé Z (1966-1991)	Girondine (1950)	J'vins mars (1931)
Sire Jalisco B (1975-1994)	Tanagra (1963)	Furioso (1939-1967)	Precipitation (1933-1957)
Sire Jalisco B (1975-1994)	Tanagra (1963)	Furioso (1939-1967)	Maureen (1931)
Sire Jalisco B (1975-1994)	Tanagra (1963)	Délicieuse (1947)	Jus de Pomme (1931)
Sire Jalisco B (1975-1994)	Tanagra (1963)	Délicieuse (1947)	Tapissière
Dam Dirka (1969-1995)	Nankin (1957)	Fra Diavolo (1938-1959)	Black Devil (1931)
Dam Dirka (1969-1995)	Nankin (1957)	Fra Diavolo (1938-1959)	Frayeur (1928)
Dam Dirka (1969-1995)	Nankin (1957)	Constellation (1946)	Plein d'Espoirs (1937)
Dam Dirka (1969-1995)	Nankin (1957)	Constellation (1946)	Henriette (1942)
Dam Dirka (1969-1995)	Ondine de Baugy (1958)	Harphortas (1939)	Amfortas
Dam Dirka (1969-1995)	Ondine de Baugy (1958)	Harphortas (1939)	Harporia (1927)
Dam Dirka (1969-1995)	Ondine de Baugy (1958)	Nadine (1935)	Issu d'Amblie (1930)
Dam Dirka (1969-1995)	Ondine de Baugy (1958)	Nadine (1935)	Irlandaise

== Breeding and cloning ==
A true "European head of breed", Quidam is better known for his breeding career than for his performances. Ranked in the Top 10 stallions worldwide in 2011, he sired 1,771 foals, making him one of the most bred horses in the world. His main genetic qualities are energy, propulsion and backstroke. Quidam is approved for breeding by a large number of studbooks, including Selle Français, Zangersheide, BWP, Hanoverian, Holsteiner and Dutch Warmblood. He sired numerous champions such as Guidam, VDL Groep Verdi, Nabab de Rêve, Dollar de la Pierre, Rahotep de Toscane, Quantum, Quite Easy I, Hurlevent de Brekka, New York and Quaprice Bois Margot, who in turn became sires, enabling his genetics to continue to spread. He is also the sire of Prestige St-Lois.

Quidam de Revel (1982-2013)
Guidam (1988)	Antinea III (1988)	Nabab de Rêve (1990-2015)	Dollar de la Pierre (1991-2012)	French Cancan (1993)	Quite Easy I (1994)	Hurlevent de Brekka (1995)	Quaprice Bois Margot (1998-2008)	Le Prestige St-Lois (1999)	Luigi d'Amaury (1999)	Ouessant de Perhet (2002)	Verdi TN N.O.P (2002)	Rahotep de Toscane (2005)	Quel Homme de Hus (2006)

Quidam has a clone named Paris-Texas, born on March 13, 2005, in the USA, who had to be euthanized. A second clone, Quidam de Revel II Z, was conceived for the Zangersheide stud and approved for breeding under the Anglo-European studbook: he is now being bred by Joris de Brabander.

== See also ==
- Pieraz (second cloned horse)
