= Nankin =

Nankin may refer to:

- Nanjing, capital of Jiangsu province of the People's Republic of China, formerly romanised as Nankin
  - Nankeen, a kind of pale yellowish cloth, originally made at Nanjing, China
- Nankin bantam or Nankin is a British bantam breed of chicken
- Nankin, Georgia, a community in the United States
- Nankin, Queensland, a locality in the Shire of Livingstone, Queensland, Australia
- Nankin Township, Michigan, parts of which became incorporated into Garden City, Inkster, and Wayne, Michigan, with the remainder of the township incorporated as the city of Westland, Michigan in 1966.
- Nankin (stallion) (1957), is a half-bred stallion from France
