= Belgian Riding Pony =

Belgian breed of horse

- Conservation status: FAO (2007): no data; DAD-IS (2026): unknown
- Other names: Belgische Rijpony; Poney de Selle Belge
- Country of origin: Belgium

Traits
- Height: Large: 132–149 cm; Small: 110–132 cm
- Colour: any

The Belgian Riding Pony is a Belgian breed or stud-book of small horses and ponies of sport horse type. It resembles the Belgian Warmblood but is smaller and more compact; it is bred for competitive performance in dressage, show-jumping and other sports.

The stud-book is held by the same organisation that holds the stud-book for the Belgian Warmblood. It is open: eligibility for registration is based on performance, on type and on parentage. Two size types are recognised, a small and a large.

== History ==
Breeding of the Belgian Riding Pony began in 1973. The breed association celebrated its fortieth anniversary in 2017.

Population data has not been reported to DAD-IS since 2013, when the total number of the horses was estimated at 240–360, with 120 brood-mares and 33 stallions standing at stud. In 2026 the conservation status of the breed was unknown.

== Characteristics ==
The Belgian Riding Pony is morphologically similar to the Belgian Warmblood, but is smaller and more compact. The horses may be of any colour. Two size types are recognised: the small type may stand between 110 and 132 cm at the withers, the large type from 132 to 149 cm..

There is no breed standard; the stud-book is open: eligibility for registration is based on performance, on type and on parentage.

== Use ==
It is bred for competitive performance in dressage, show-jumping and other horse sports.
