= Haflinger =

Breed of horse developed in Austria and northern Italy

Haflinger/Avelignese
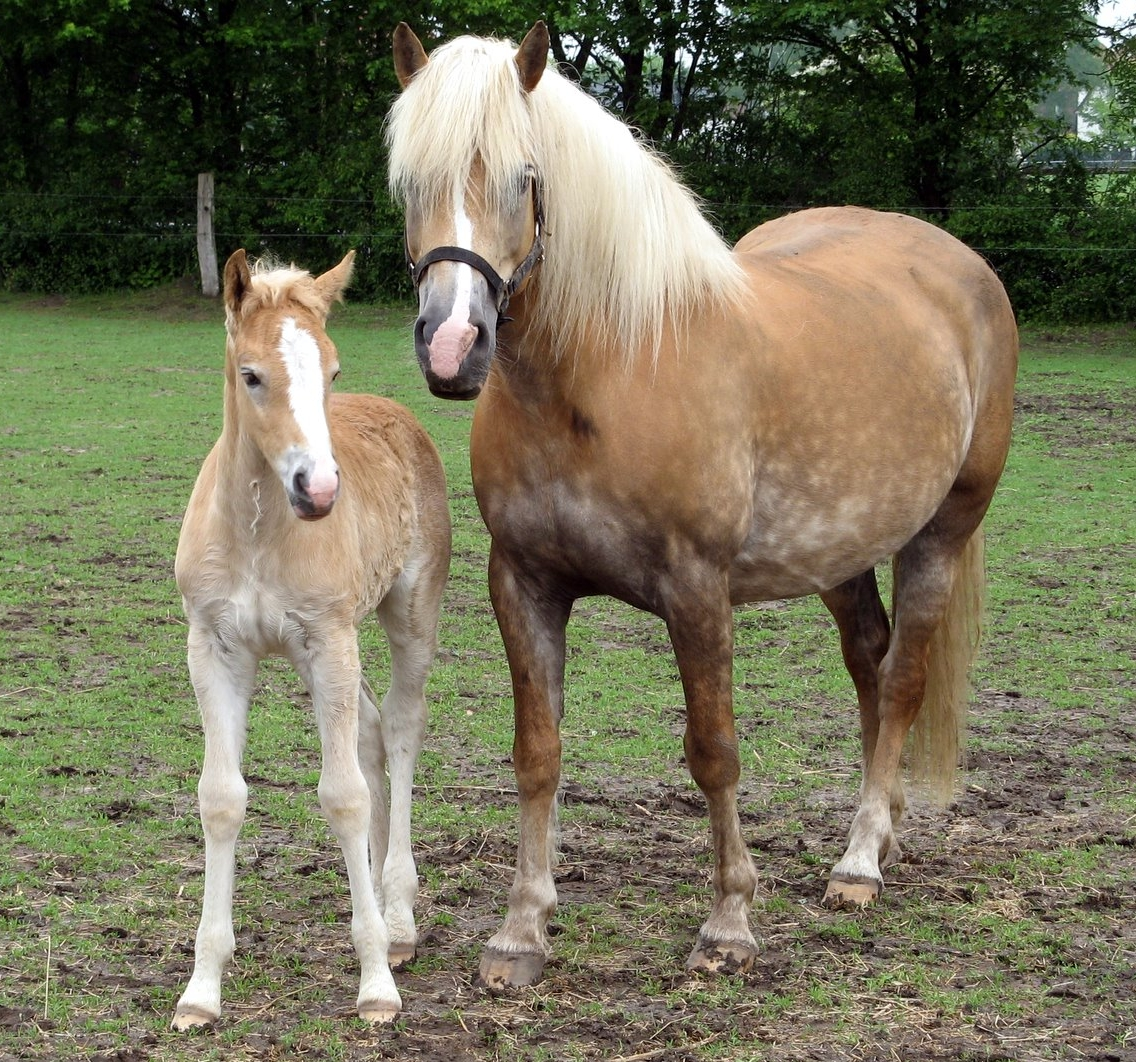
- A Haflinger mare and foal
- Other names: Avelignese
- Country of origin: Austria, Italy

Traits
- Distinguishing features: Small horse, sturdy build, chestnut coat body color with flaxen mane and tail

Breed standards
- World Haflinger Federation; American Haflinger Registry; The Haflinger Society of Great Britain

The Haflinger, also known as the Avelignese, is a breed of horse developed in Austria and northern Italy (namely Hafling in South Tyrol region) during the late 19th century. Haflinger horses are relatively small, are always chestnut with flaxen mane and tail, have distinctive gaits described as energetic but smooth, and are well-muscled yet elegant. The breed traces its ancestry to the Middle Ages; several theories for its origin exist. Haflingers, developed for use in mountainous terrain, are known for their hardiness. Their current conformation and appearance are the result of infusions of bloodlines from Arabian and various European breeds into the original native Tyrolean ponies. The foundation sire, 249 Folie, was born in 1874; by 1904, the first breeders' cooperative was formed. All Haflingers can trace their lineage back to Folie through one of seven bloodlines. World Wars I and II, as well as the Great Depression, had a detrimental effect on the breed, and lower-quality animals were used at times to save the breed from extinction. During World War II, breeders focused on horses that were shorter and more draft-like, favored by the military for use as packhorses. The emphasis after the war shifted toward animals of increased refinement and height.

In the postwar era, the Haflinger was indiscriminately crossed with other breeds and some observers feared the breed was in renewed danger of extinction. However, starting in 1946, breeders focused on producing purebred Haflingers and a closed stud book was created. Interest in the breed increased in other countries, and between 1950 and 1974, the population grew, even while the overall European horse population decreased. Population numbers continued to increase steadily, and as of 2005, almost 250,000 Haflingers existed worldwide. Breeding farms are in several countries, although most of the breeding stock still comes from Austria. In 2003, a Haflinger became the first horse to be cloned, resulting in a filly named Prometea.

Haflingers have many uses, including light draft, harness work, and various under-saddle disciplines such as endurance riding, dressage, equestrian vaulting, and therapeutic riding. They are also still used by the Austrian and German armies for work in rough terrain. The World Haflinger Federation, the international governing body that controls breed standards for the Haflinger, is made up of a confederation of 22 national registries, and helps set breeding objectives, guidelines, and rules for its member organizations.

== Breed characteristics ==
The name "Haflinger" comes from the village of Hafling, which today is in northern Italy. The breed is also called the Avelignese, from the Italian name for Hafling, which is Avelengo or previously Aveligna. Haflingers are always chestnut in color and occur in shades ranging from a light gold to a rich golden chestnut or liver hue. The mane and tail are white or flaxen. The height of the breed has increased since the end of World War II, when it stood an average of 13.3 hands (55 inches, 140 cm). The desired height today is between 13.2 and 15.0 hands (54 and 60 inches, 137 and 152 cm). Breeders are discouraged from breeding horses under the minimum size, but taller individuals may pass inspection if they otherwise meet requirements of the breed registry. The breed has a refined head and light poll. The neck is of medium length, the withers are pronounced, the shoulders sloping, and the chest deep. The back is medium-long and muscular; the croup is long, slightly sloping, and well-muscled. The legs are clean, with broad, flat knees and powerful hocks showing clear definition of tendons and ligaments. The Haflinger has rhythmic, ground-covering gaits. The walk is relaxed but energetic. The trot and canter are elastic, energetic, and athletic with a natural tendency to be light on the forehand and balanced. Some knee action is seen, and the canter has a very distinct motion forwards and upwards. One important consideration in breeding during the second half of the 20th century was temperament. A requirement for a quiet, kind nature has become part of official breed standards and is checked during official inspections. Some sources recognize two types of Haflingers, a shorter, heavier type used for draft work, and a taller, lighter type used for pleasure riding, light driving, and under-saddle competition. The Food and Agriculture Organization recognizes both an "Avelignese" and an "Avelignese Tradizionale" as existing in Italy, although, as of 2007, only 13 of the latter existed, including only one breeding stallion. However, all breed organizations recognize and register only one type.

=== Stallion lines ===
All Haflingers today trace their lineage through one of seven stallion lines to Folie, the foundation stallion of the breed. Usually, colts are given a name beginning with the letter or letters denoting their stallion line, and fillies are given a name beginning with the first letter of their dam's name. The exceptions are France, where foals are given a name beginning with a letter of the alphabet designated to be used for that year; and Italy, where colts' names must begin with the letter or letters designating the stallion line, while fillies' names begin with the letter designated for a given year. The seven stallion lines are:

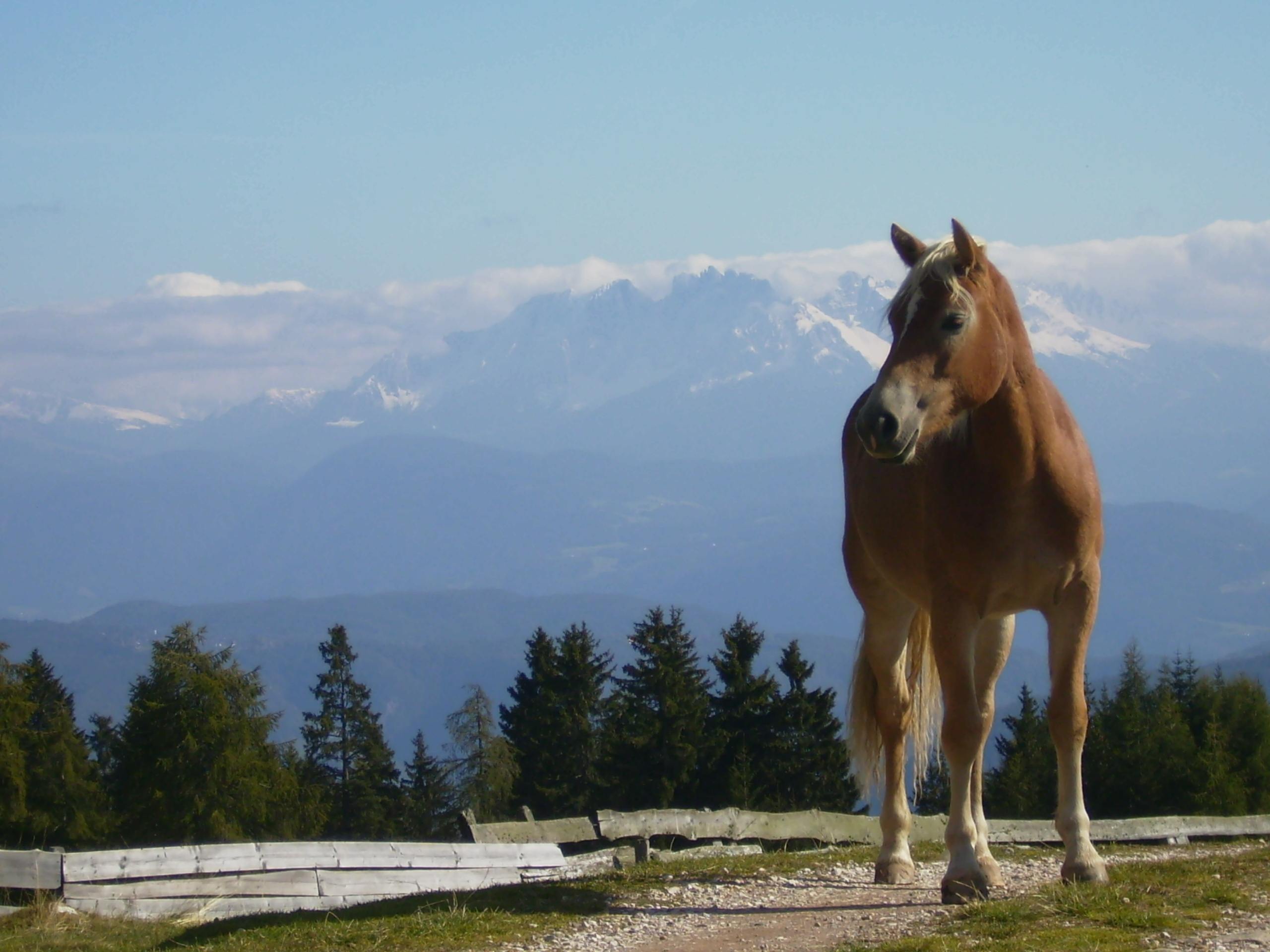
A Haflinger in South Tyrol

- A-line. Founded by Anselmo, born 1926. One of the most prevalent lines today, descendants include the second-largest number of stallions at stud. Anselmo was brought back to stud at the age of 21, when a lack of stallions after World War II led to concerns that the line would not survive, and produced several stallions now represented in all Haflinger breeding populations worldwide.
- B-line. Founded by Bolzano, born 1915. Bolzano's less common line, although strong in Austria, is not prevalent elsewhere. The line is spreading nevertheless; the U.S. and several European countries including Great Britain are establishing Bolzano lines.
- M-line. Founded by Massimo, born 1927. An Italian stallion, Massimo founded a line that is prevalent in Austria and Italy.
- N-line. Founded by Nibbio, born 1920. Early in its history, the Nibbio line split into two branches, one in Italy and one in Austria. The N-line is populous, with the greatest number of stallions at stud. It is one of two (the other being the A-line) with a presence in all Haflinger breeding countries. The line is most prolific in Austria and Italy.
- S-line. Founded by Stelvio, born 1923. Stelvio is the least numerous of the lines, threatened with extinction after non-Haflinger blood was introduced in Germany. Currently most populous in Italy, Austrian authorities are working to re-establish it.
- ST-line. Founded by Student, born 1927. Although the ST-line has a large number of stallions, its geographic spread is limited because of unselective breeding in some countries. Germany and the U.S. hold the most horses of this line outside Austria.
- W-line. Founded by Willi, born 1921. The W-line, threatened by crossbreeding early in its history, maintains a strong presence in the Netherlands, Canada and the U.S., with a smaller population in Austria.

Bolzano and Willi were great-great grandsons of Folie, while the rest were great-great-great grandsons. Especially in the early years of the breed's history, some inbreeding occurred, both by accident and design, which served to reinforce the breed's dominant characteristics. During the 1980s and 1990s, several studies were conducted to examine morphological differences among the breed lines. Significant differences were found in some characteristics, including height and proportions; these have been used to help achieve breeding objectives, especially in Italy during the 1990s.

== History ==
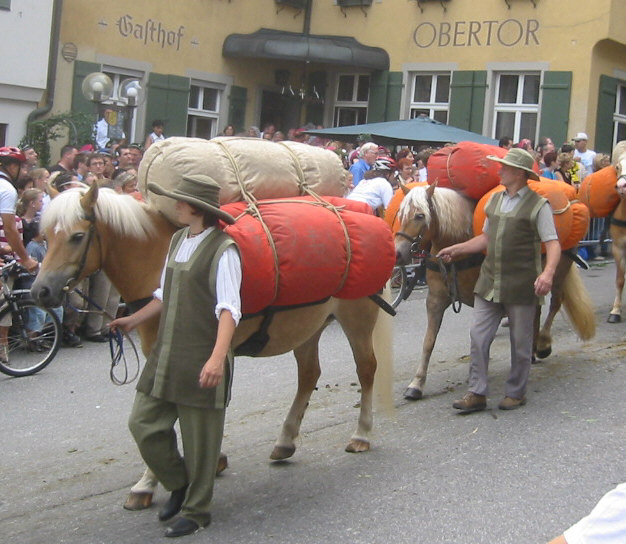
Haflingers used as pack horses during a medieval re-enactment

The history of the Haflinger horse traces to the Middle Ages. Origins of the breed are uncertain, but two main theories are given. The first is that Haflingers descend from horses abandoned in the Tyrolean valleys in central Europe by East Goths fleeing from Byzantine troops after the fall of Conza in 555 AD. These abandoned horses are believed to have been influenced by Oriental bloodlines and may help explain the Arabian physical characteristics seen in the Haflinger. A type of light mountain pony was first recorded in the Etsch Valley in 1282, and was probably the ancestor of the modern Haflinger. The second theory is that they descended from a stallion from the Kingdom of Burgundy sent to Margrave Louis of Brandenburg by his father, Louis IV, Holy Roman Emperor, when the Margrave married Princess Margarete Maultasch of the Tyrol in 1342. It has also been suggested that they descend from the prehistoric forest horse. Haflingers have close connections to the Noriker, a result of the overlapping geographic areas where the two breeds were developed. Whatever its origins, the breed developed in a mountainous climate and was well able to thrive in harsh conditions with minimal maintenance.

The breed as it is known today was officially established in the village of Hafling in the Etschlander Mountains, then located in Austria-Hungary. The Arabian influence was strongly reinforced in the modern Haflinger by the introduction of the stallion El Bedavi, imported to Austria in the 19th century. El-Bedavi's half-Arabian great-grandson, El-Bedavi XXII, was bred at the Austro-Hungarian stud at Radautz and was sire of the breed's foundation stallion, 249 Folie, born in 1874 in the Vinschgau. Folie's dam was a native Tyrolean mare of refined type. All Haflingers today must trace their ancestry to Folie through one of seven stallion lines (A, B, M, N, S, ST, and W) to be considered purebred. The small original gene pool, and the mountain environment in which most original members of the breed were raised, has resulted in a very fixed physical type and appearance. In the early years of the breed's development Oriental stallions such as Dahoman, Tajar and Gidran were also used as studs, but foals of these stallions lacked many key Haflinger traits and breeding to these sires was discontinued. After the birth of Folie in 1874, several Austrian noblemen became interested in the breed and petitioned the government for support and direction of organized breeding procedures. It was 1899 before the Austrian government responded, deciding to support breeding programs through establishment of subsidies; high-quality Haflinger fillies were among those chosen for the government-subsidized breeding program. Since then the best Haflinger fillies and colts have been chosen and selectively bred to maintain the breed's quality. Horses not considered to meet quality standards were used by the army as pack animals. By the end of the 19th century Haflingers were common in both South and North Tyrol, and stud farms had been established in Styria, Salzburg and Lower Austria. In 1904, the Haflinger Breeders' Cooperative was founded in Mölten, in South Tyrol, with the aim of improving breeding procedures, encouraging pure-breeding and establishing a studbook and stallion registry.

=== World Wars ===
World War I resulted in many Haflingers being taken into military service and the interruption of breeding programs. After the war, under the terms of the Treaty of Saint Germain, South Tyrol (including Hafling) was ceded to Italy, while North Tyrol remained in Austria. This split was extremely detrimental to the Haflinger breed, as most of the brood mares were in South Tyrol in what was now Italy, while the high-quality breeding stallions had been kept at studs in North Tyrol and so were still in Austria. Little effort at cooperation was made between breeders in North and South Tyrol, and in the 1920s a new Horse Breeders' Commission was established in Bolzano in Italy, which was given governmental authority to inspect state-owned breeding stallions, register privately owned stallions belonging to Commission members, and give prize money for horse show competition. The Commission governed the breeding of the Italian population of both the Haflinger and the Noriker horse. In 1921, because of the lack of breeding stallions in Italy, a crossbred Sardinian-Arabian stallion was used for the Haflinger breeding program, as well as many lower-quality purebred Haflingers.

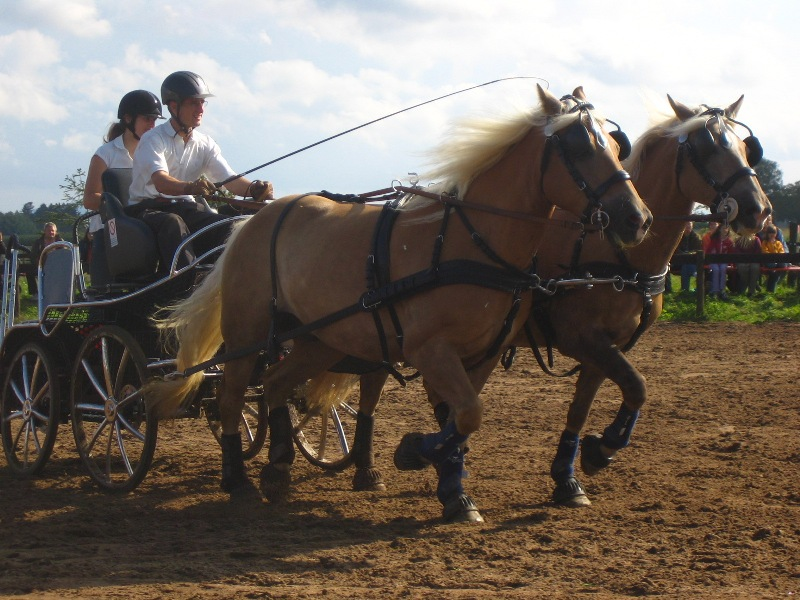
A combined driving event

If not for the presence of Haflinger stallions at a stud farm in Stadl-Paura in Upper Austria after World War I, the Haflinger might well not exist in Austria today. Despite these stallions, the Haflinger breeding programs were not on solid footing in Austria, with governmental focus on other Austrian breeds and private breeding programs not large enough to influence national breeding practices. During this time, the breed was kept alive through crosses to the Hucul, Bosnian, Konik and Noriker breeds. In 1919 and 1920, the remaining stallions were assigned throughout Austria, many to areas that had hosted private breeding farms before the war. In 1921, the North Tyrolean Horse Breeders' Cooperative was formed in Zams, and in 1922, the first Haflinger Breeders' Show was held in the same location. Many extant Austrian Haflinger mares were considered to be of too low quality to be used as brood mares, and every effort was made to import higher-quality brood mares from the South Tyrol herds now in Italy. In 1926, the first studbook was established in North Tyrol. In the late 1920s, other cooperatives were established for Haflinger breeders in Weer and Wildschönau, and were able to gain government permission to purchase 100 Haflinger mares from South Tyrol and split them between North Tyrol, Upper Austria and Styria. This single transaction represented one third of all registered mares in South Tyrol, and many others were sold through private treaty, leaving the two regions comparable in terms of breeding-stock populations. In 1931, another breeders' cooperative was established in East Tyrol in Austria, and Haflinger breeding spread throughout the entire Tyrolean province.

The Great Depression of the late 1920s and early 1930s dampened horse prices and had an unfavorable effect on Haflinger breeding, but from 1938 onwards markets improved as a result of the buildup for World War II. All crossbred horses and colts not of breeding quality could be sold to the army, and higher subsidies were given by the government to Haflinger breeders. However, the demands of the war also meant that many unregistered mares of Haflinger type were covered by registered stallions, and the resulting progeny were registered, resulting in a degradation of breeding stock. In 1935 and 1936, a breeding program was begun in Bavaria through the cooperation of the German agricultural authorities, military authorities and existing stud farms. The first government-run German Haflinger stud farm was established in Oberaudorf with brood mares from North and South Tyrol, and several private stud farms were established elsewhere in the country. The combination of a high demand for pack horses and variable amounts of breed knowledge of the purchasers led to the purchase of both high- and low-quality horses, which had mixed results on breed quality. Purchases by Bavarians also resulted in a further depletion of Austrian and Italian stock, already low from the population depletions of both world wars. However, the German Armed Forces were ready purchasers, and the purchasing and breeding continued. Despite some claims that only purebred horses were registered, many well-known Bavarian studs had crossbred maternal lines. During World War II, Haflingers were bred to produce horses that were shorter and more draft-like for use as packhorses by the military. After the war, breeding emphasis changed to promote refinement and height.

=== Postwar period ===
After World War II, Haflinger breeding programs almost collapsed as the military stopped buying horses and government-run breeding centers were closed. Breeders continued to emphasize those features necessary for pack horses (the largest use by the military), but neglected other key Haflinger characteristics. Haflinger breeding had to change to create a horse that better fit modern trends toward recreational use. Around this time, all small breed cooperatives were combined into the Haflinger Breeders' Association of Tyrol. Post-World War II Tyrol, including the breeding center at Zams, was under the control of American forces, who slaughtered many horses to provide meat for hospitals. However, the troops did allow the breeding director to choose 30 stallions to be kept for breeding purposes. Those horses were relocated to the French-occupied Kops Alm high pasture in Vorarlberg, but they were subsequently stolen and never seen again. In other areas of Tyrol, all one- to three-year-old colts had been requisitioned by military breeding centers, and therefore it was necessary to treat colts not even a year old as potential breeding stallions. In the years after World War II, some observers feared that the breed was dying out because of indiscriminate crossing with other breeds.

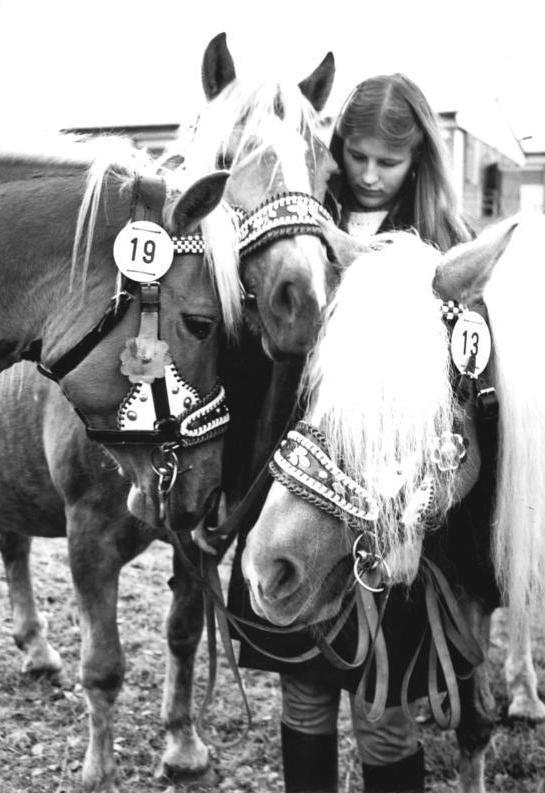
Haflinger mares in Germany in the mid-1980s

At conferences in 1946 and 1947, the decision was made to breed Haflinger horses from pure bloodlines, creating a closed stud book with no new blood being introduced. The Tyrolean Haflinger Breeders' Association established its own stallion center and prohibited private breeders from keeping stallions, thus ensuring that the association maintained 100 percent control of breeding stallions. In Bavaria, several young stallions had been saved and breeders could privately own stallions. Bavarian and Tyrolean breeders maintained close ties and cooperated extensively. North Tyrolean breeders were also able to acquire several high-quality older stallions and lower-quality young stallions from South Tyrol. In 1947, the Federation of Austrian Haflinger Breeders was established as a governing organization for the provincial associations. At this time a large-scale breed show was held, attended by visitors from Switzerland, who soon after their return home sent a purchasing commission to Austria and were instrumental in founding the Haflinger population in Switzerland. Southern Tyrol had no difficulty in selling its horses, as all of Italy was in the market to purchase horses, and breeding populations spread as far south as Sicily.

Between 1950 and 1974, even as the overall European equine population was dropping due to increased mechanization, the Haflinger population was increasing. In that time period, the population of registered Haflinger brood mares rose from 1,562 to 2,043. This was mainly a result of the increased marketing of the breed, and happened even as Norwegian Fjord horses were exported to Germany, reducing the resources available for Haflinger breeding programs. Through well-planned marketing campaigns, the Haflinger became the dominant small-horse breed in the region. In 1954, Yugoslavia and Italy purchased breeding stock from North Tyrol to establish their own Haflinger programs and in 1956 the German Democratic Republic followed suit. The first Haflingers were exported to the United States from Austria in 1958 by Tempel Smith of Tempel Farms in Illinois and into Czechoslovakia in 1959. Tyrolean Haflingers were purchased by the Netherlands and Turkey in 1961. In Turkey they were both bred pure and crossed with the Karacabey breed. In 1963, the first Haflinger was exported to Great Britain, in 1969 two Haflinger mares were presented to Queen Elizabeth II upon her official visit to Austria, and in 1970, the Haflinger Society of Great Britain was established. The first Haflinger was exported to France in 1964, and they continued to be transferred to that country until 1975, when the breeding population became stable. Between 1980 and 2000, the population of Haflingers in France tripled. In 1965, the first international Haflinger show was held at Innsbruck, with horses from East and West Germany, the Netherlands, Italy, Switzerland and Austria participating. Haflingers were first exported to Belgium in 1966, to Bhutan in 1968, and to Poland, Hungary and Albania in subsequent years. The importations to Bhutan encouraged interest in the breed in other parts of Asia. In 1974, the first Haflinger was imported to Australia. The first Canadian Haflinger was registered with the United States breed association in 1977, and a Canadian registry was formed in 1980. Between 1970 and 1975, Haflingers were also imported into Luxemburg, Denmark, Thailand, Colombia, Brazil, southwest Africa, Sweden and Ireland. They have also been imported into Japan. Haflingers maintained a population on every populated continent by the end of the 1970s. Worldwide breeding continued through the 1980s and 1990s, and population numbers increased steadily.

=== 21st century ===
Although the Haflinger is now found all over the world, the majority of breeding stock still comes from Austria, where state studs own the stallions and carefully maintain the quality of the breed. However, breeding farms are located in the United States, Canada, Germany, the Netherlands, and England. As of 2007, Italian Haflingers had the largest population of any breed in that country. Due to selective breeding during the 1990s aiming to increase height, some breed lines became favored over others in Italy. A 2007 study found little inbreeding within the Italian Haflinger population as a whole, although certain less popular lines had a higher incidence due to the existence of fewer breeding stallions. Haflingers are bred throughout France, especially in the provinces of Brittany, Burgundy, and Picardy, with between 350 and 400 foals born each year. Slovenia also has a small Haflinger population, with around 307 breeding mares and 30 breeding stallions as of 2008. A 2009 study found that although a very small amount of inbreeding occurred in the population, it was increasing slightly over the years. As of 2005, almost 250,000 Haflingers remained in the world.

On May 28, 2003, a Haflinger filly named Prometea became the first horse clone born. Bred by Italian scientists, she was cloned from a mare skin cell, and was a healthy foal. In 2008, Prometea herself gave birth to the first offspring of an equine clone, a colt named Pegaso sired by a Haflinger stallion through artificial insemination. The American Haflinger Registry does not allow horses born as a result of cloning to be registered, although as of 2010 other nations' registries have not yet entered a decision on the topic. In January 2012, Breyer Horses created a model horse of the Haflinger.

== Uses ==
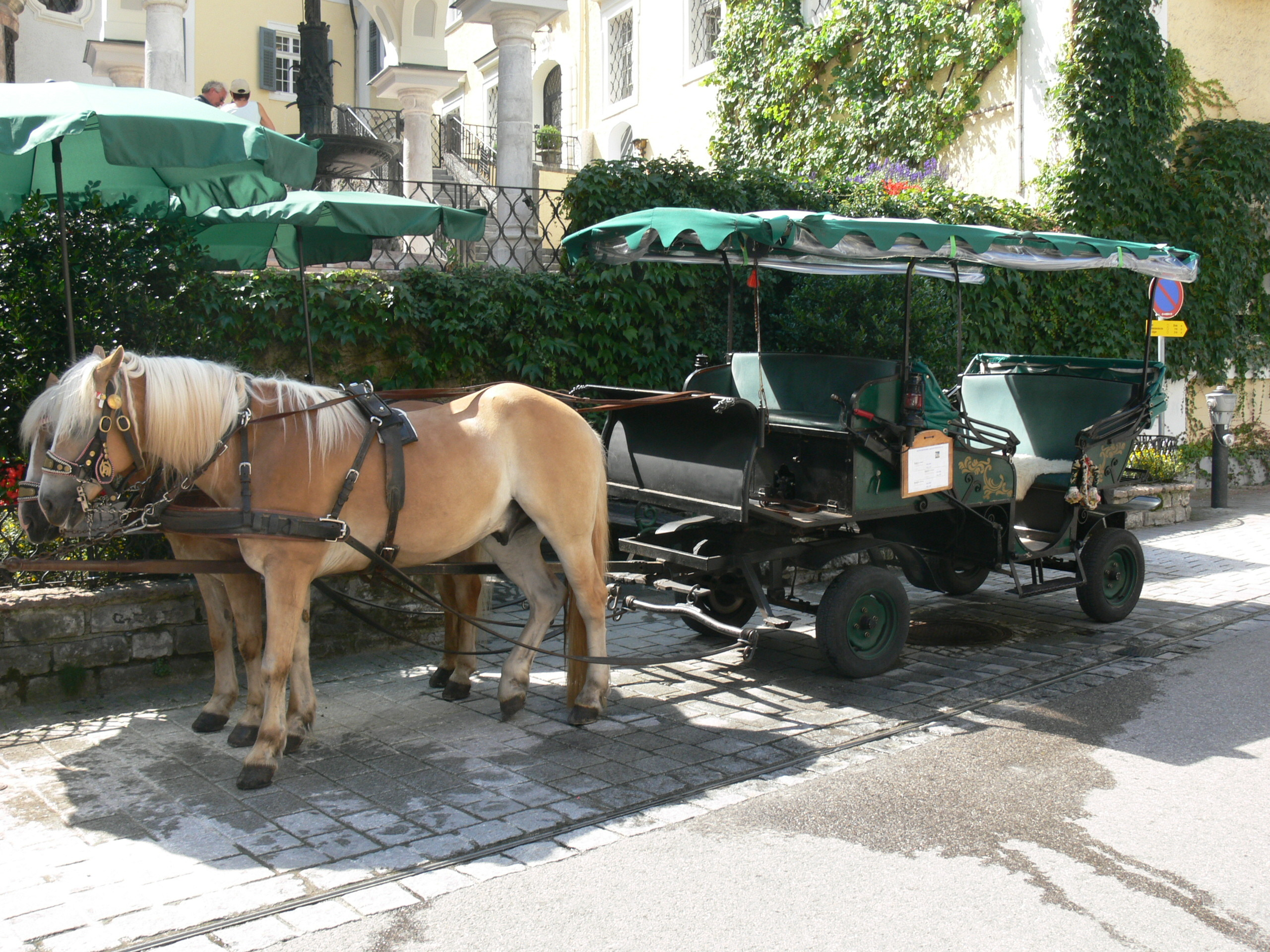
Haflingers pulling a carriage in northern Austria

Haflingers were bred to be versatile enough for many under-saddle disciplines, but still solid enough for draft and driving work. The Haflinger was originally developed to work in the mountainous regions of its native land, where it was used as a packhorse and for forestry and agricultural work. In the late 20th century Haflingers were used by the Indian Army in an attempt to breed pack animals for mountainous terrain, but the program was unsuccessful because of the Haflinger's inability to withstand the desert heat. The Austrian Army still uses Haflingers as packhorses in rough terrain. They are used most often in high Alpine terrain, with slopes up to 40% and steps of up to 40 cm (16 in). Around 70 horses are in use, held by the 6th Infantry Brigade and based in Hochfilzen. The Haflinger is also used by the German Army for rough terrain work and demonstration purposes.

Today, the breed is used in many activities that include draft and pack work, light harness and combined driving, and many under-saddle events, including western-style horse-show classes, trail and endurance riding, dressage, show jumping, vaulting, and therapeutic riding programs. They are used extensively as dressage horses for children, but are tall and sturdy enough to be suitable riding horses for adults. In the 1970s, British Prince Philip, Duke of Edinburgh competed with a driving team of four Haflingers. Several national shows for Haflingers are held, including those in Germany, Great Britain, and the United States. Despite the Austrian prohibitions against crossbreeding, other countries have practiced this to some extent. Good-quality animals have been produced out of crosses between Haflingers and both Arabians and Andalusians. British enthusiasts maintain a partbred registry for Haflinger crosses. In Germany, horses that are 75 percent Haflinger and 25 percent Arabian are popular and are called Arabo-Haflingers. In Italy, where horse meat consumption is at the highest among all European Community members, Haflingers provide a large percentage of national production. Most are either bred specifically for meat production and slaughtered between the ages of 10 and 18 months, or as a result of health problems, or age. The Haflinger also produces the majority of the horse milk consumed in Germany.

== Registration ==
Breed organizations exist in many countries to provide accurate documentation of Haflinger pedigrees and ownership, and to promote the Haflinger breed. Most are linked to each other through membership in the World Haflinger Federation (WHF), established in 1976. The WHF establishes international breeding guidelines, objectives and rules for studbook selection, and performance tests. They also authorize European and world shows and compile an annual list of Haflinger experts, or adjudicators. The WHF is the international umbrella organization, with 21 member organizations in 22 countries. Membership organizations include the Haflinger Horse Society of Australia, the Australian Haflinger Horse Breeders Association, the Canadian Haflinger Association, the Haflinger Pferdezuchtverband Tirol (Tyrolean Haflinger Breeding Association), the Italian Associazione Nazionale Allevatori Cavalli di Razza Haflinger Italia and the American Haflinger Registry, as well as a division for breeders in countries that are not already members. National organizations are allowed to become members of the WHF through agreeing to promote pure breeding and maintain the hereditary characteristics of the Haflinger breed. Member organizations must maintain both a purebred studbook and a separate part-bred studbook for animals with Arabian or other bloodlines.

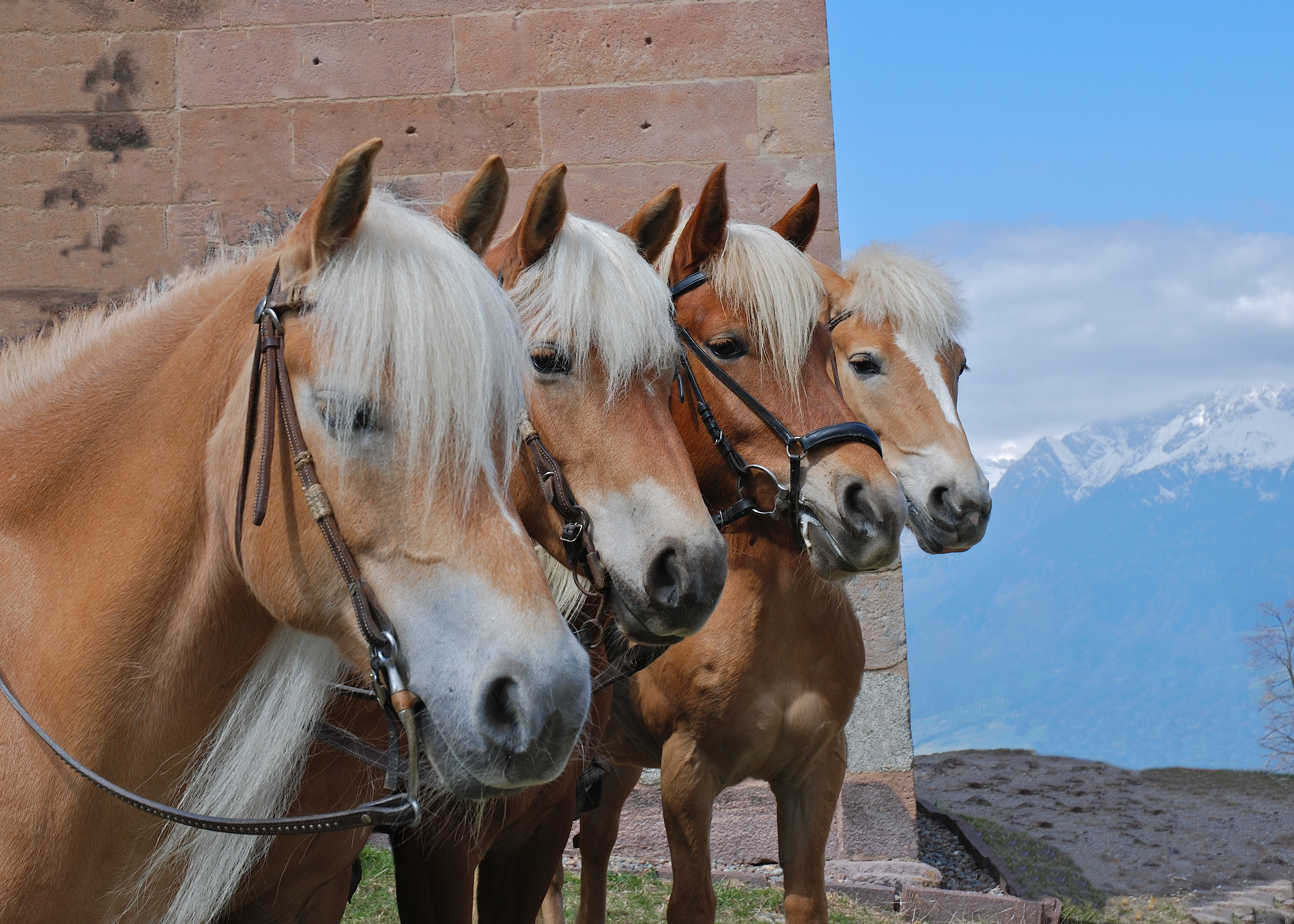
A group of Haflinger horses: Note the similarities in color and profile.

A strict system of inspection, started in Austria, has evolved to ensure that only good-quality stock meeting high standards are used for breeding. This is coupled with close maintenance of the studbook to maintain inspection validity. Mares must be inspected and registered with the stud book before they can be covered, and multiple forms are needed to prove covering and birth of a purebred Haflinger foal. Within six months of birth, foals are inspected, and those considered to have potential as breeding stock are given certificates of pedigree and branded. Horses are reinspected at three years old, checked against written association standards, and if they pass, are then entered into the studbook. After their final inspection, Haflingers from Austria and Italy are branded with a firebrand in the shape of an edelweiss. Horses from Austria and from South Tyrol have the letter "H" in the center of the brand, while horses from all other parts of Italy have the letters "HI". Horses are graded based on conformation, action, bone, height, temperament and color. Mares must have a fully registered purebred pedigree extending six generations back to be considered for stud-book acceptance. Stallions are registered separately. Colts must have a dam with a fully purebred pedigree, and are inspected based on hereditary reliability and likely breeding strength, as well as the other qualifications. Each stallion's registration certification must show a fully purebred pedigree extending back four generations, and records of mares covered, percentages of pregnancies aborted, still-born and live-born, and numbers and genders of foals born. This information is used to match stallions and mares for breeding. Tyrolean colts undergo an initial assessment, and those not chosen must be either gelded or sold out of the Tyrolean breeding area. The chosen colts are reassessed every six months until a final inspection at the age of three, when the best stallions are chosen for Tyrolean breeding, after which they are purchased by the Austrian Ministry of Agriculture and made available for breeding throughout the region. The others are either gelded or sold out of the region. Other countries base their registration and selection practices on Tyrolean ones, as is required by the WHF.
