= Genopole =

Biotech research campus near Paris, France

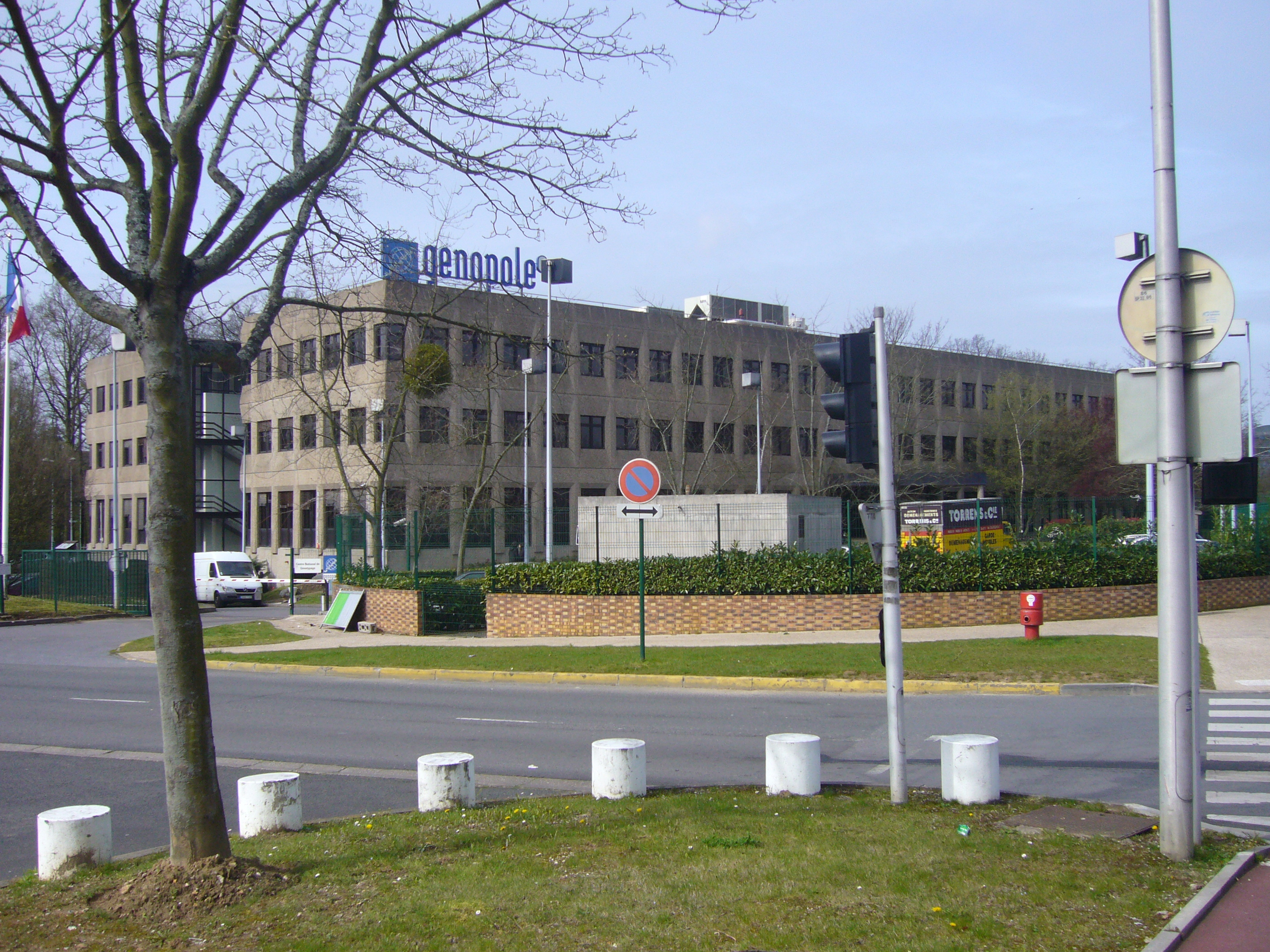
Building of the National Genotyping Center / IG / CEA, on the Genopole biopark

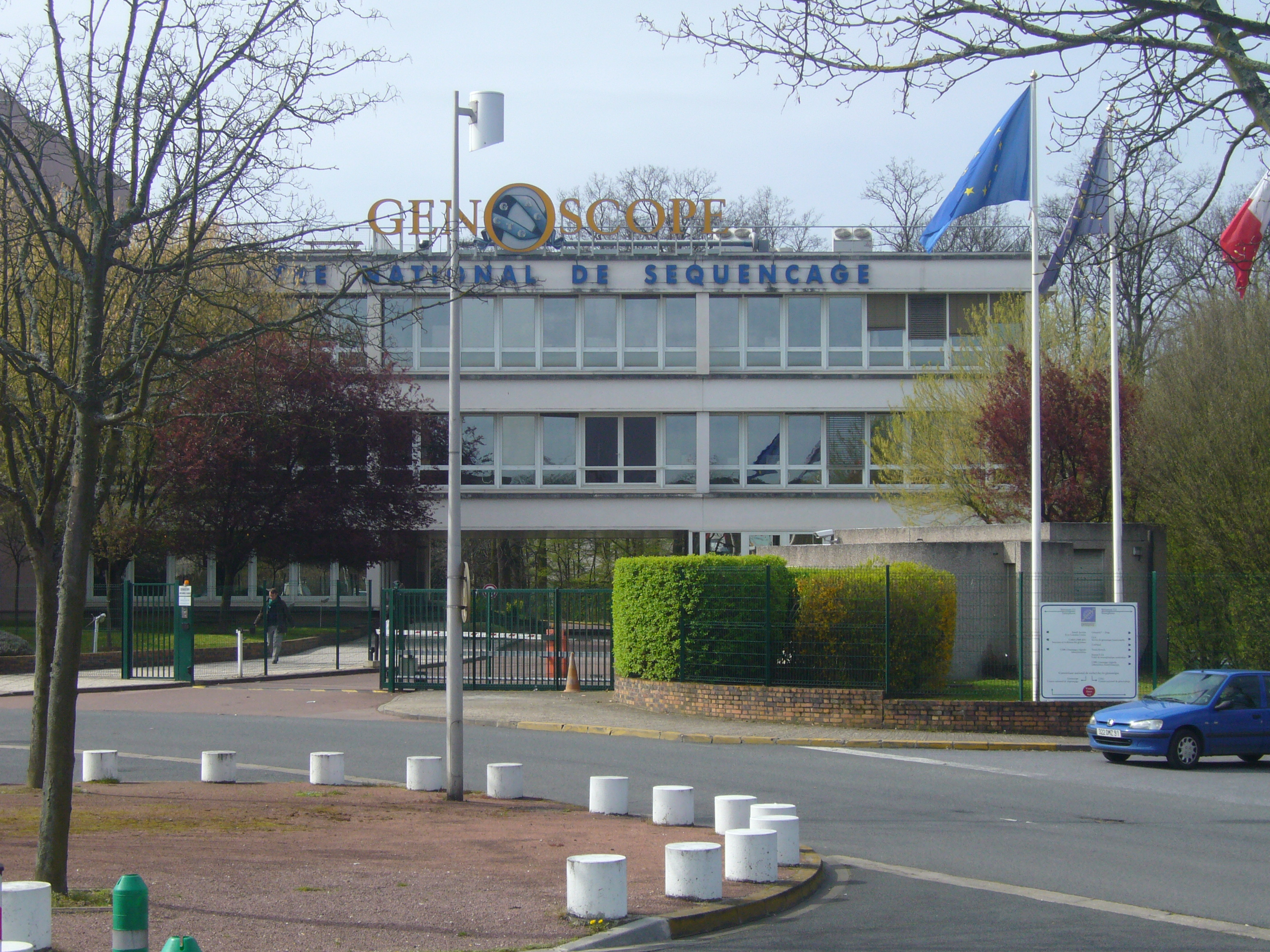
Genoscope / IG / CEA building, on the Genopole biopark

Genopole is a French research centre in Évry-Courcouronnes focused on biotherapies, genetics, genomics, post-genomics, xenobiology and the development of biotechnology industries.

As of 2018, it contains 17 academic research laboratories, 87 biotechnology companies, 20 scientific platforms and technical platforms shared around the University of Évry Val d'Essonne, one of the founding members of Paris-Saclay University.

== Notable Researcher ==
- Jean Weissenbach, French biologist

== See also ==
- Genoscope
