= German Trotter =

German breed of trotting horse

- Conservation status: FAO (2007): no data; DAD-IS (2024): unknown
- Other names: Traber; Deutsche Traber
- Country of origin: Germany

Traits
- Height: average 160 cm

The German Trotter or German: Traber is a German breed of trotting horse. It is used mainly for racing in harness to a sulky, but may also run in saddled trotting races.

== History ==
The German Trotter derives principally from the Orlov Trotter, with later influence from the French Trotter and the American Standardbred.

A stud-book for trotting horses in Germany is documented from 1896; it is now kept by the Hauptverband für Traberzucht e.V., formerly the Hauptverband für Traber-Zucht und -Rennen e.V., which also regulates all aspects of harness racing in the country. Registration is subject to a performance test, which includes a minimum time of 90 seconds over a distance of 1000 m; horses that run the distance in 80 seconds or less are registered in a separate section of the stud-book.

In 2018 there were approximately 10000 horses registered, consisting of about 5700 mares, 2300 stallions and 3000 geldings.

== Characteristics ==
The horses stand between 1.55 and 1.70 m at the withers, with an average of about 1.60 m. The coat is solid-coloured or grey.
