= Belgian Trotter =

Belgian breed of trotting horse

- Conservation status: FAO (2007): no data; DAD-IS (2024): unknown
- Other names: Belgische Draver; Trotteur Belge; Halfbloeddraver
- Country of origin: Belgium

The Belgian Trotter, Dutch: Belgische Draver, French: Trotteur Belge, is a Belgian breed of trotting horse. It is used mostly for racing in harness to a sulky, but may also run in saddled trotting races.

== History ==
The Belgian Trotter originates from cross-breeding of local carriage and saddle horses with imported Thoroughbred stock, and so may also be called 'Halfbloeddraver' or 'half-blood trotter'. It has been influenced by the American Standardbred, the German Trotter and the French Trotter, to which it is closely similar, although it may be somewhat smaller and lighter.

Since 2009 the stud-book has been held by the Vlaamse Federatie voor Paardenwedrennen.

In 2013 the total number of the horses was estimated to be in the range 442–663, with 221 brood-mares and 81 stallions distributed among 26 breeders.
