= Nankin (stallion) =

Selle Français stallion

- Breed: Selle Français
- Sire: Fra Diavolo
- Dam: Constellation
- Sex: Male
- Foaled: Uriel, Dirka, Foudre de guerre, and Golden Comet; Audouville-la-Hubert
- Color: Bay

Nankin (b. April 15, 1957) is a half-bred stallion, son of the Thoroughbred Fra Diavolo, founder of the Selle Français stud-book. He is a renowned sire for show jumping.

== History ==
Nankin was born on April 15, 1957, at the breeder Alfred J. Brohier's farm in Audouville-la-Hubert, Manche. He was acquired by the National Stud of Saint-Lô, where he stood at stud from 1961 to 1980. He was approved for reproduction in France from 1975 to 1983 as a national stallion.

== Description ==
Nankin is a Selle Français section A (original) bay stallion, standing at 1.64 m.

== Origins ==
Through his ancestors, Nankin is 62 % Thoroughbred. He is a son of the Thoroughbred stallion Fra Diavolo and the half-bred mare Constellation, by the half-bred Plein d'Espoirs.

Pedigree of Nankin (1957)
Sire Fra Diavolo (1938-1959)	Black Devil (1931)	Sir Gallahad (1920)	Teddy (1913)
Sire Fra Diavolo (1938-1959)	Black Devil (1931)	Sir Gallahad (1920)	Plucky Liege (1912)
Sire Fra Diavolo (1938-1959)	Black Devil (1931)	La Palina (1924)	Ambassador IV (1911)
Sire Fra Diavolo (1938-1959)	Black Devil (1931)	La Palina (1924)	Parthenis (1911)
Sire Fra Diavolo (1938-1959)	Frayeur (1928)	Blandford (1919)	Swynford (1907)
Sire Fra Diavolo (1938-1959)	Frayeur (1928)	Blandford (1919)	Blanche (1912)
Sire Fra Diavolo (1938-1959)	Frayeur (1928)	Freia III (1922)	Dark Ronald (1905)
Sire Fra Diavolo (1938-1959)	Frayeur (1928)	Freia III (1922)	Fliegerin (1913)
Dam Constellation (1946)	Plein d'Espoirs (1937)	Orange Peel (1919-1940)	Jus d'Orange (1912)
Dam Constellation (1946)	Plein d'Espoirs (1937)	Orange Peel (1919-1940)	Rirette II (1913)
Dam Constellation (1946)	Plein d'Espoirs (1937)	Imposante	No info
Dam Constellation (1946)	Plein d'Espoirs (1937)	Imposante	No info
Dam Constellation (1946)	Henriette (1942)	Bourguebus	No info
Dam Constellation (1946)	Henriette (1942)	Bourguebus	No info
Dam Constellation (1946)	Henriette (1942)	Diablesse	No info
Dam Constellation (1946)	Henriette (1942)	Diablesse	No info

== Descendants ==
Nankin is the sire of the Olympic champion Talisman B, born in 1963 and ridden by Paul Schockemöhle, as well as Faon Rouge (1971), Espionne Rouge (1970), Dirka (1969, ISO 156), the dam of Quidam de Revel (ridden by Nelson Pessoa), Doris, and Epson, brother of French Cancan. His sons include the stallions Foudre de Guerre (1971), Nidor Platière (1979), Kouglof II (1976), and Uriel (1964). Many international sport horse stud-books seek the descendants of Nankin.

Nankin (1957)	Uriel (1964-1988)	Florissant (1971)
Nankin (1957)	Uriel (1964-1988)	Hidalgo de Riou (1973-1994)
Nankin (1957)	Uriel (1964-1988)	Jesabelle d'Elles (1975)
Nankin (1957)	Uriel (1964-1988)	Karielle (1976)
Nankin (1957)	Uriel (1964-1988)	May Flower Ill (1978)
Nankin (1957)	Uriel (1964-1988)	Paladin des Ifs (1981-2006)
Nankin (1957)	Uriel (1964-1988)	Rosire (1983-2010)
Nankin (1957)	Uriel (1964-1988)	Si tu viens (1984-2016)
Nankin (1957)	Uriel (1964-1988)	Sisi de la Cour (1984-2010)
Nankin (1957)	Uriel (1964-1988)	Tornade du Prelet (1985)
Nankin (1957)	Dirka (1969-1995)	Quidam de Revel (1982-2013)
Nankin (1957)	Dirka (1969-1995)	Razzia de Revel (1983)
Nankin (1957)	Dirka (1969-1995)	Aiglon Rouge (1988-2011)
Nankin (1957)	Foudre de guerre (1971)	Loripierre (1977)
Nankin (1957)	Foudre de guerre (1971)	Rafale d'orage (1983)
Nankin (1957)	Golden Comet (1972)	
