= Pieraz =

Cloned horse

- Breed: Arabian
- Sex: Male
- Foaled: France

Pieraz (b. 1983) was a gray-coated Arabian gelding, son of Pierscien and Aziella, and two-time world endurance champion with American rider Valery Kanavy. He is also the world's second cloned horse.

== History ==
Pieraz was castrated at the age of 3. He was bought in France in 1989 at the age of six, for just 2,500 francs, the equivalent of 375 euros. With his American rider Valery Kanavy, he became World Equestrian Endurance Champion in The Hague in 1994 and in Kansas City in 1996. He completed a 160 km course, including 85 km of deep sand, almost 7 minutes ahead of his nearest rival.

== Cloning ==
As Pieraz was neutered, he had no offspring. This gelding is best known as the world's second cloned horse, after Prometea. In 2002, Pieraz's rider Valery Kanavy heard about cloning for the first time, and was extremely interested in the idea of her horse passing on his genetic heritage. This made Pieraz the first horse to be cloned with the aim of preserving genetic capital. To this end, Eric Palmer, former INRA researcher and now CEO of Cryozootech, carried out a biopsy on the gelding, then aged 24. On February 25, 2005, Pieraz-Cryozootech-Stallion (or Pieraz Z CL), a perfectly healthy 42 kg colt, was born. Around 40 shareholders have financed this cloning, and in exchange share one dose of semen per year. The Haras Nationaux in France, initially in favor of collecting and marketing Pieraz clone semen in partnership with the Cryozootech laboratory, finally refused at the insistence of a decision-maker.

The cloned foal was presented to the public at the Rambouillet racecourse in 2006. Now a stallion, he was approved and declared fertile in 2007. He sired endurance champion mare Varoussa. In April 2008, the world's first cloned foal was born.

== See also ==
- Horse cloning
