= Belgian Sport Horse =

Belgian breed of warmblood sport horse

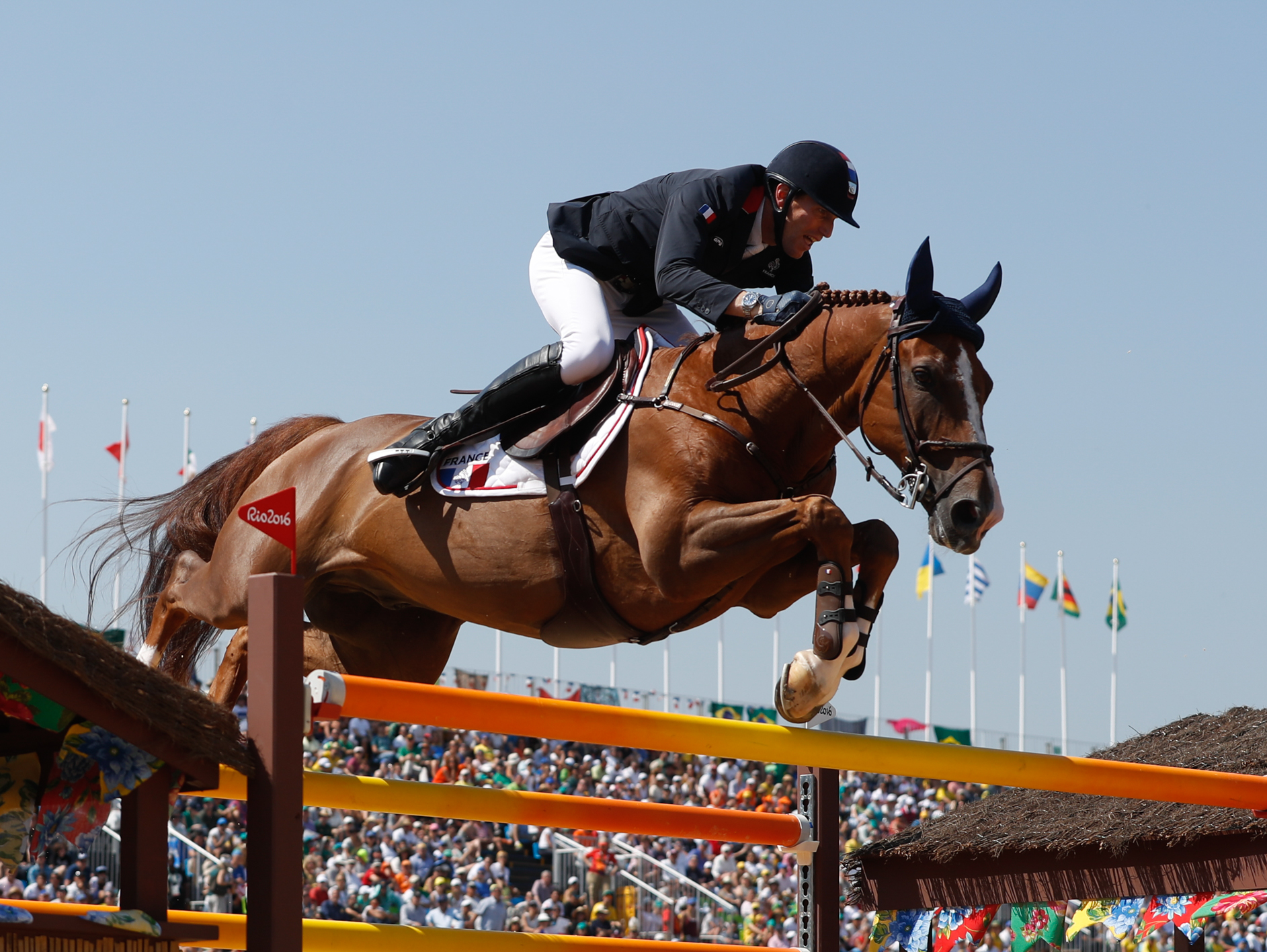
- Rêveur de Hurtebise ridden by Kevin Staut at the 2016 Olympic Games in Rio de Janeiro

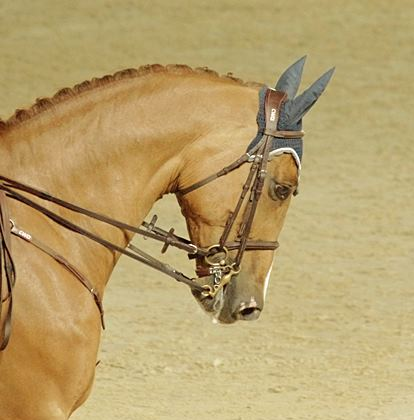
- Uchin van de Centaur in 2012
- Conservation status: FAO (2007): not at risk; DAD-IS (2025): unknown
- Other names: sBs; Belgian Halfblood; Belgian Halfbred; Belgisch Sportpaard; Cheval de Sport Belge; Demi-Sang Belge
- Country of origin: Belgium
- Distribution: southern Belgium, Wallonia

Traits
- Height: 162 cm; 158–180 cm

The Belgian Sport Horse, Dutch: Belgisch Sportpaard, French: Cheval de Sport Belge, is a Belgian breed of warmblood sport horse. It is one of three Belgian warmblood breeds or stud-books, the others being the Belgian Warmblood and the Zangersheide. It is bred for dressage, for show-jumping and for three-day eventing.

== History ==
The Belgian Sport Horse has its origins in the early twentieth century, when warmblood horses were bred by cross-breeding imported Selle Français and Thoroughbred stallions with local animals of the Belgian Draught breed, with the intention of producing cavalry horses. Later influences were from Selle Français, Dutch Warmblood and Hanoverian. A breed society, La Société d'Encouragement pour l'Elevage du Cheval d'Armes, was established in 1920; from about 1930 the principal aim was to breed horses for leisure use and the name Société du Cheval de Demi-sang Belge was adopted. In 1967 it became a royal society, with the name Société Royale du Cheval de Demi-sang Belge. In 1991 the society adopted the name Studbook SBS or SBS Studbook.

In 2007 the conservation status of the breed was listed by the Food and Agriculture Organization of the United Nations as "not at risk". No population data has been reported to DAD-IS since 2013, when the total number for the breed was estimated at 12000–19000; its conservation status in 2025 was "unknown".

== Characteristics ==
The horses stand on average some 162 cm at the withers. The coat is solid-coloured.

== Use ==
Like most warmblood sport horses, the Belgian Sport Horse is bred for performance in the three classic competitive disciplines, dressage, show-jumping and the three-day event.
