= Zangersheide =

Belgian breed of horse

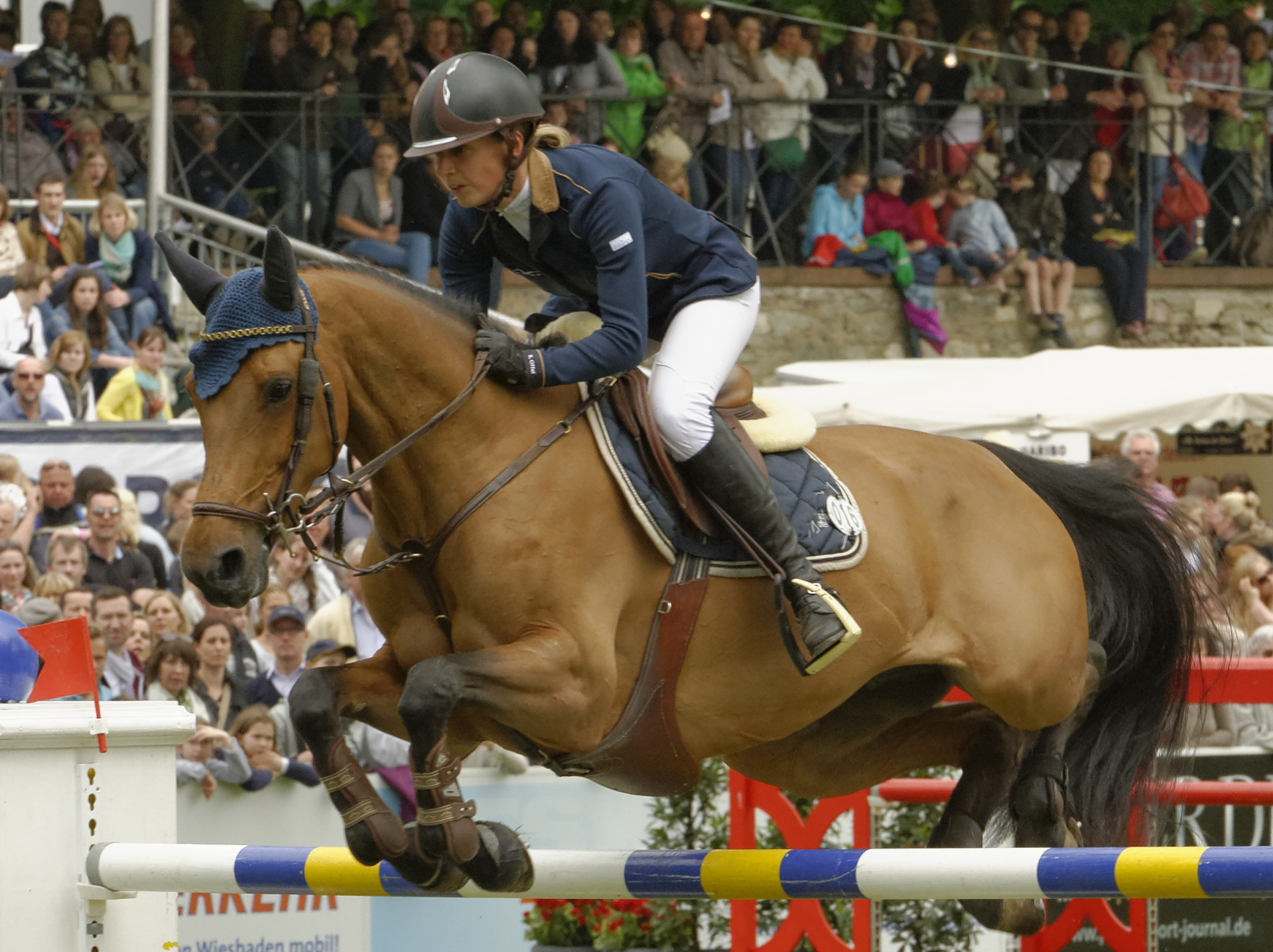
- B-Once Z ridden by Katharina Offel at Wiesbaden in 2013

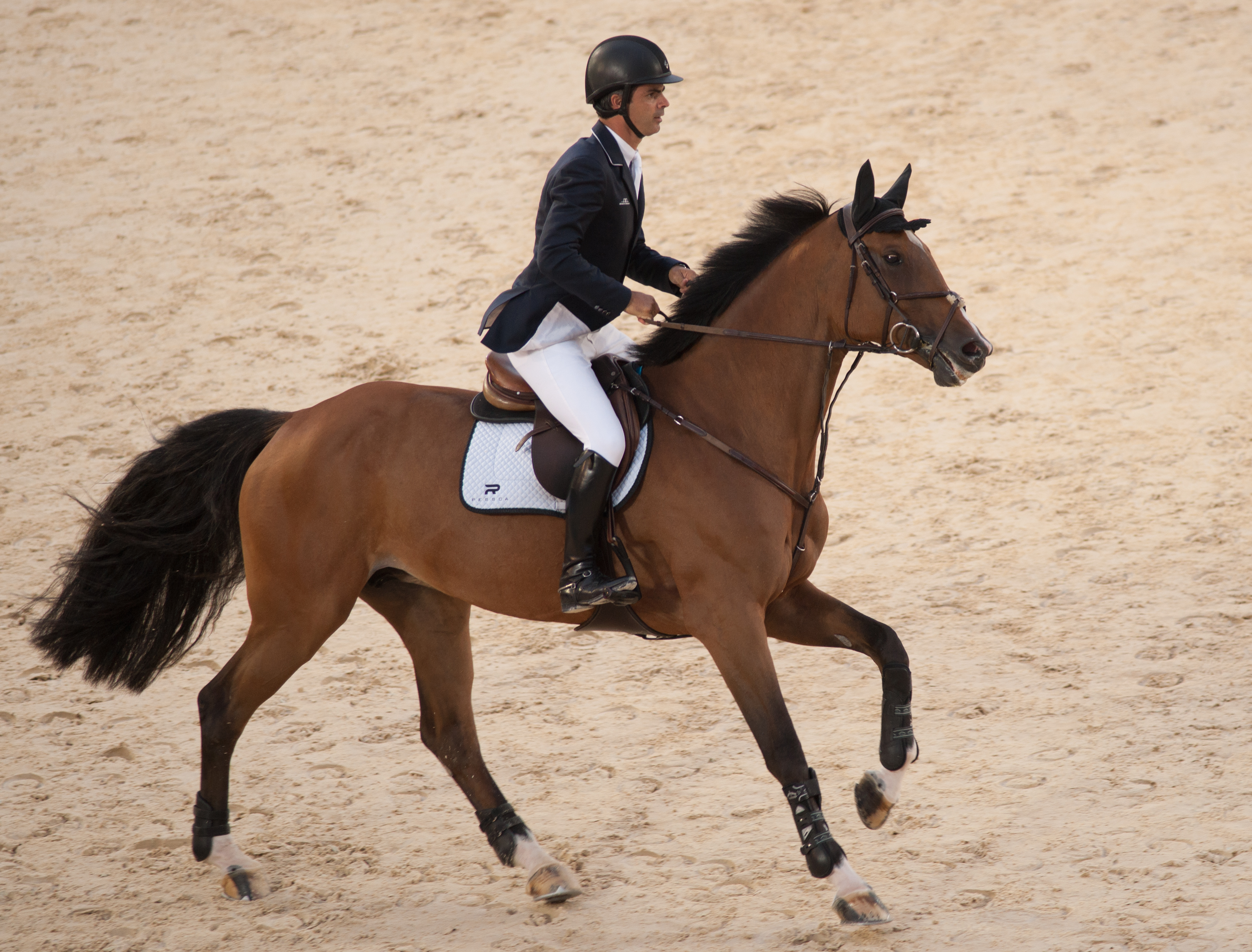
- Conservation status: FAO (2007): no data; DAD-IS (2019): at risk; DAD-IS (2025): unknown
- Country of origin: Belgium
- Use: show-jumping

Traits
- Height: 163–173 cm

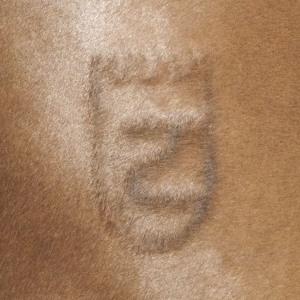
Brand of the Zangersheide stud

The Zangersheide is a Belgian breed or stud-book of warmblood sport horses. It is one of three Belgian warmblood breeds or stud-books, the others being the Belgian Sport Horse and the Belgian Warmblood. It is bred at the stud of the same name near Lanaken, in the province of Limburg in eastern Flanders, close to the Dutch border. Breeding and selection are directed at performance in show-jumping.

== History ==
The Zangersheide stud was established in the 1970s, with the aim of breeding and selecting horses on the basis of their performance in show-jumping. A stud-book was started in 1992 or 1993; registered animals have a Z suffixed to their names. Registration is based on selection for show-jumping performance, and the stud-book is open to any breed of performance horse; it includes horses of Hanoverian, Holsteiner and Selle Français origin.

In 2014 the breeding stock amounted to some 2700 animals, of which 340 were stallions. In 2019 the conservation status of the breed was listed in DAD-IS as "at risk", while in 2025 it was listed as "unknown".

== Characteristics ==
The horses may be grey or any of the usual dark colours – bay, black or chestnut. Heights at the withers are usually in the range 163 to 173 cm.

== Use ==
The breeding and selection of the Zangersheide are directed specifically at performance in show-jumping. In the show-jumping ranking published jointly by the World Breeding Federation for Sport Horses and the Fédération Équestre Internationale in May 2019, the Zangersheide stud was in second place after the Dutch Koninklijk Warmbloed Paardenstamboek Nederland or KWPN.
