= Belgian Warmblood =

Belgian breed of horse

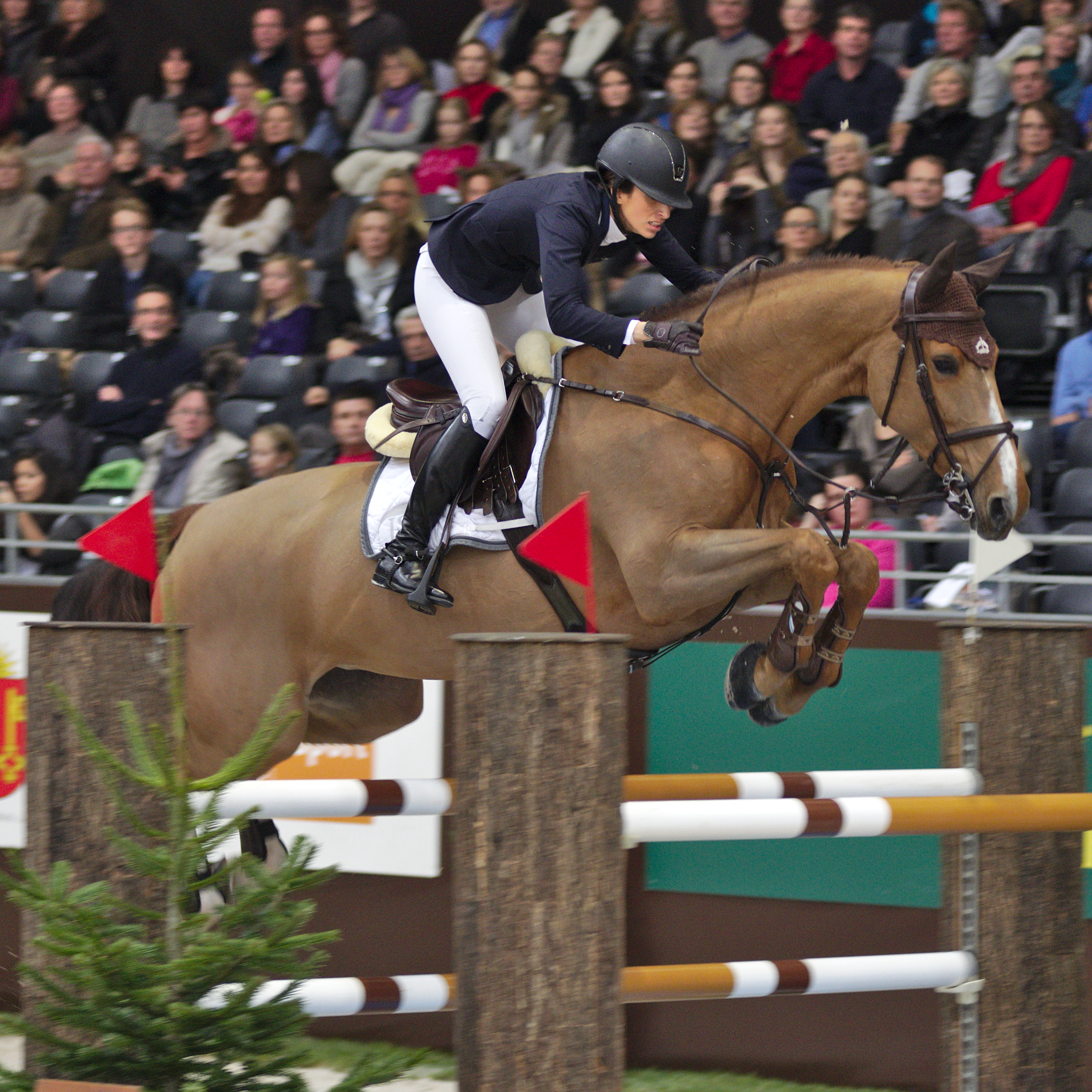
- Electra Van't Roosakker ridden by Janika Sprunger, Concours hippique international de Genève, 13 December 2013

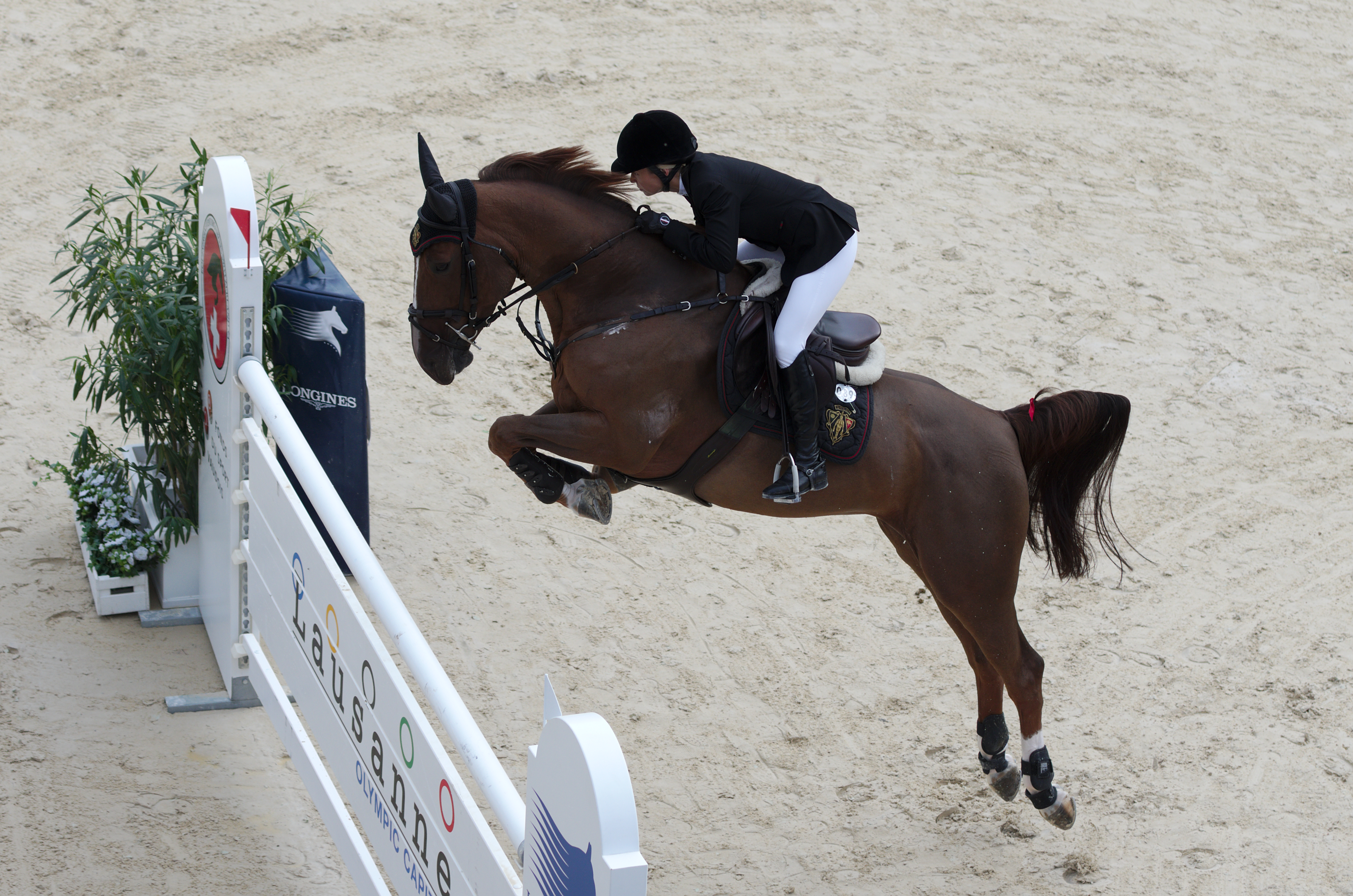
- Edwina Tops-Alexander on Fair Light van't Heike in Lausanne, 2013
- Other names: BWP; Belgisch Warmbloedpaard; Belgian Saddlebred
- Country of origin: Belgium
- Standard: BWP
- Use: dressage; show-jumping; three-day eventing

Traits
- Height: 162–173 cm (16–17 h)

The Belgian Warmblood or Belgisch Warmbloedpaard is a Belgian breed of warmblood sport horse. It is bred principally for show-jumping, but is also suitable for dressage and for three-day eventing. It is one of three Belgian warmblood breeds or stud-books, the others being the Zangersheide and the Belgian Sport Horse – to which last it is quite similar.

== History ==
Breeding of the Belgian Warmblood was begun in 1937, from foundation stock that included Gelderlanders from Holland, Hanoverians from Germany and Norman stock from France. It was initially bred as an agricultural riding horse, as in the northern or Flemish-speaking part of Belgium the breeding of saddle horses was restricted to protect breeding of the Belgian Draught or Brabant heavy horse. After this restriction was lifted in 1954, a breed society, the Fokvereninging van het Landbourijpaard, was formed; a stud-book was opened in 1955. In 1953 the first stallion show took place, illegally, with three stallions.

The stud-book grew rapidly; in 2004 approximately 3500 mares were covered by approved Belgian Warmblood stallions.

In 2010, the BWP was ranked fourth in the FEI/WBFSH International Show Jumping standings, behind the KWPN-Dutch Warmblood, the Holsteiner and the Selle Français stud-books.

== Characteristics ==
The horses vary in size and substance; heights are usually in the range 162–173 cm at the withers.

As with other European warmbloods, stallion registration is subject to rigorous studbook selection. Stallions three or four years old may be entered for the Hengstenkeuring or stallion test, which lasts for several days and includes a veterinary inspection, a conformation inspection, and tests of jumping ability both with and without a rider. To retain status in the stud book, stallions must compete in the Klassieke Cyclus (classic cycle) of show-jumping contests. Optional tests are available for mares, of conformation and free jumping ability.
