= CSI Gijón =

Show jumping event in Gijón, Spain

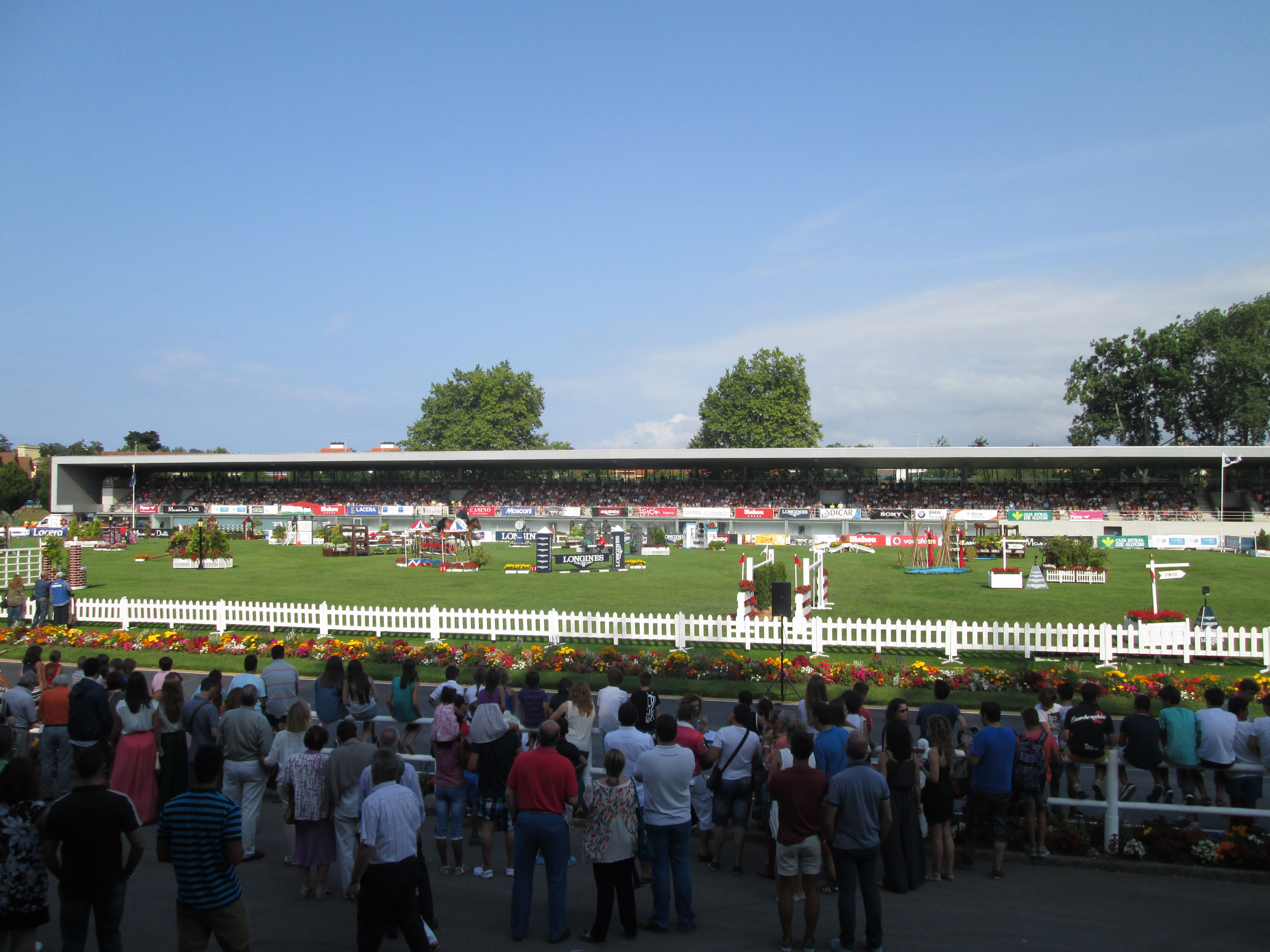
The Prince of Asturias Grand Prix in the CSIO Gijón 2014

The International Show Jumping Contest of Gijón, commonly known as CSI Gijón or CSIO Gijón when it becomes official, is a show jumping event held in Gijón, Spain, at the Las Mestas Sports Complex.

It was a CSI 5* until 2022, and it is a CSI4* since then. One of the main characteristics of the event is the fact that betting is allowed and very popular among spectators.

== History ==
The event was established in 1941 to promote equestrianism in Gijón and to offer an important sporting event in the city during the summertime. The first competition took place during 20–24 August 1942, and was a complete success as crowds of around 10,000 people gathered for the event, a rather unusual amount for what was not considered a spectator sport at the time.

In 1987, the event has been the Spanish official show jumping horse show for the first time. In 1995, it recovered this condition until 2019 with the only exception of 2008.

In December 2019, the organizers resigned to the officiality of the event as they did not accept the conditions requested by the FEI about replacing the grass with sand and banning bets.

On 14 December 2020, the Principality of Asturias declared the Show Jumping Contest as a Festivity of Regional Touristic Interest.

== Nations Cup ==
When the event is chosen as Spain's official show jumping event, becoming a CSIO, it includes a Nations Cup competition. In 1999 was the Samsung Nations Cup Final event.

=== Nations Cup winners ===
Year	Team	Riders
1987	Great Britain	Nick Skelton, Janet Hunter, Malcolm Pyrah and John Whitaker
1995	France	Edouard Couperie, Patrice Delaveau, Philippe Rozier and Michel Robert
1996	France	Thierry Pomel, Pierre Jarry, Jean Paul Casile and Michel Robert
1997	Great Britain	Nick Skelton, Robert Smith, James Fisher and Michel Whitaker
1998	France	Philippe Leoni, Michel Robert, Jean-Marc Nicolas and Xabier Caumont
1999	France	Michel Robert, Xabier Caumont, Thierry Pomel and Alexandra Lederman
2000	Belgium	Peter Van Broekhoven, Joris Meulemans, Sven Laevers and Dirk Demmersman
2001	Spain	Ricardo Jurado, Fernando Fourcade, Cristino Torres and Fernando Sarasola
2002	Spain	Rutheford Latham, Luis Jesús Escobar, Fernando Sarasola and Ricardo Jurado
2003	Ireland	Lt. Shane Carey, Harry Marshall, Capt. Gerry Flyn and Clement MacMahon
2004	France	Ludovic Leygue, Bernard Sainsardos, Philippe Leoni and Hervé Godignon
2005	Belgium	Kristof Cleeren, Yves Simon, Niels Bruynseels and François Mathy Jr.
2006	France	Florian Angot, Laurente Goffinet, Hervé Godignon and Michel Robert
2007	France	Timothé Anciaume, Robert Breul, Jerome Debas-Montagner and Julien Épaillard
2009	France	Patrice Delaveau, Clemence Laborde, Simon Delestre and Jean Marc Nicolas
2010	Belgium	Pieter Devos, Judy-Ann Melchior, Dirk Demmersman and Philippe Le Jeune
2011	Spain	Pilar Lucrecia Cordón, Eduardo Álvarez Aznar, Jesús Garmendia and Julio Arias
2012	France	Penélope Leprevost, Kevin Staut, Marie Hécart and Aymeric de Ponnat
2013	Netherlands	Gert Jan Bruggink, Jur Vrieling, Frank Schuttert and Harrie Smolders
2014	United States	Ashlee Bond, Catherine Pasmore, Quentin Judge and Georgina Bloomberg
2015	France	Alexandre Fontanelle, Cyril Bouvard, Adeline Hécart and Aymeric de Ponnat
2016	Great Britain	Tim Stockdale, Joe Whitaker, Samuel Hutton and Robert Bevis
2017	France	Kevin Staut, Edward Levy, Grégory Cottard and Nicolas Delmotte
2018	Spain	Manuel Fernández Saro, Mikel Aizpurua, Laura Roquet and Eduardo Álvarez Aznar
2019	Italy	Filippo Marco Bologni, Antonio Maria Garofalo, Emanuele Camilli, Antonio Alfonso

=== Performance by country ===
Country	Winners	Years winner
France	11	1995, 1996, 1998, 1999, 2004, 2006, 2007, 2009, 2012, 2015, 2017
Spain	4	2001, 2002, 2011, 2018
Belgium	3	2000, 2005, 2010
Great Britain	3	1987, 1997, 2016
Ireland	1	2003
Netherlands	1	2013
United States	1	2014
Italy	1	2019

=== Participation details ===
Team	1987 (8)	1995 (9)	1996 (7)	1997 (9)	1998 (11)	1999 (8)	2000 (9)	2001 (8)	2002 (9)	2003 (10)	2004 (10)	2005 (11)	2006 (8)	2007 (9)	2009 (10)	2010 (11)	2011 (10)	2012 (13)	2013 (10)	2014 (11)	2015 (12)	2016 (12)	2017 (9)	2018 (10)	2019 (12)
Argentina									6th											11th					
Australia	•																								
Belgium	•					7th	1st			3rd	7th	1st	6th	5th	7th	1st	9th	9th	3rd	6th	4th			7th	
Bulgaria						8th																			
Canada																2nd	9th	7th			9th	5th	4th		
Denmark																		5th							
Egypt																						9th	9th		11th
France	3rd	1st	1st	5th	1st	1st	2nd	7th	2nd	9th	1st	10th	1st	1st	1st	2nd	5th	1st	8th	8th	1st	7th	1st	8th	3rd
Germany	5th		7th	2nd	5th	2nd	3rd	5th	5th	8th	5th	7th	8th	6th	2nd	9th		11th	6th	9th			7th	10th	4th
Great Britain	1st	4th	6th	1st	6th		6th	3rd	3rd	2nd	9th	5th	3rd	7th	4th	2nd	2nd	3rd	2nd	3rd	2nd	1st	5th	6th	2nd
Ireland		4th			3rd				7th	1st		3rd		4th	4th	5th	6th	12th	5th		2nd	8th	3rd	4th	4th
Italy		•		6th	8th	5th	5th	3rd				6th	7th	2nd		11th	8th	2nd	4th	5th		6th		2nd	1st
Mexico					11th				4th		2nd											10th	6th		10th
Netherlands	4th	2nd	3rd	4th	2nd		8th	2nd			3rd	3rd	5th	2nd	9th	8th		10th	1st		4th	3rd	2nd	3rd	8th
Norway											8th				2nd	10th	4th			7th		12th			
New Zealand																									7th
Portugal	•	•	5th	9th	10th		9th	8th		10th	6th	10th		9th	10th			13th	10th			11th		9th	12th
Qatar																				10th					
Saudi Arabia																5th									
Spain	2nd	4th	2nd	8th	4th	6th	4th	1st	1st	7th	4th	2nd	2nd	8th	6th	7th	1st	6th	7th	4th	8th	2nd	8th	1st	7th
Sweden				7th					9th			7th					3rd							4th	9th
Switzerland		•			9th	3rd			7th	6th	10th	7th			8th		7th				2nd	4th			
Ukraine																		4th			7th				
United States		2nd	4th	2nd	6th	4th	7th	6th					4th					8th	8th	1st	10th				

== Grand Prix ==
The second most important competition of the event is the Prince of Asturias Grand Prix, while the most important one is the Gijón Grand Prix.

=== Gijón Grand Prix winners ===
Year	Rider	Horse
1962	(Spain) Federico Morugán Ávila	Objetivo
1963	(France) Bernard de Fombelle	Milan D'or
1964	(Portugal) Manuel Malta da Costa	Novelista
1965	(Argentina) Hugo Arrambide	Chimbote
1966	(France) Dasque	Predestiné
1967	(Spain) Eduardo Amorós	Kif-Kif
1968	(Spain) José Antonio García Benavides	Carmín
1969	(Spain) Enrique Martinez de Vallejo	Lepanto
1970	(France) Radul	Uruapan
1971	(Spain) Enrique Martinez de Vallejo	Romántico
1972	(Portugal) Manuel Malta da Costa	Eusebio
1973	(Spain) Luis Jaime Carvajal y Salas	Kurfust
1974	(Spain) Jaime Rivera	Conquistador
1975	(Portugal) Lobo Güedes	Chopin
1976	(Spain) Luis Álvarez de Cervera	Acorne/Thor
1977	(Portugal) Manuel Malta da Costa	Ecaussevillais
1978	(Portugal) Manuel Malta da Costa	Et bien
1979	(Spain) Luis Álvarez de Cervera	Romeo
1980	(Spain) Juan Antonio de Wit	Olímpico
1981	(Switzerland) Thomas Fuchs	Willora Swiss
1982	(France) Jérôme Thomas	Gargantua C
1983	(Spain) Alberto Honrubia	Kaoua
1984	(United Kingdom) Tony Newberry	Ryans Mill
1985	(United Kingdom) Malcolm Pyrah	T.Diamond Seeker
1986	(United Kingdom) Malcolm Pyrah	Anglezarke
1987	(United Kingdom) Janet Hunter	E. Lisnamarrow
1988	(Spain) Juan Andrés Ruiz de Alda	Lingere
1989	(Spain) Luis Astolfi	Pour Le Merite
1990	(Spain) Alberto Honrubia	Pelf D'or
1991	(Spain) Alfredo Fernández Durán	Naguese Picarde
1992	(Spain) Fernando Fourcade	Avenir Di San Patrignano
1993	(Netherlands) Jos Lansink	Bollvorm`s Easy Jumper
1994	(Switzerland) Lesley McNaught	Pirol IV
1995	(United States) Alison Firestone	Gustl P
1996	(United Kingdom) Nick Skelton	Dollar Girl
1997	(France) Thierry Pomel	Thor des Chaines
1998	(United Kingdom) Nick Skelton	Hopes Are High
1999	(France) Michel Robert	Auleto
2000	(United States) Molly Ashe	Kroon Gravin
2001	(Germany) Helena Weinberg	A. Ramonus
2002	(Republic of Ireland) Lt. David O'Brien	Boherdeal Clover
2003	(Republic of Ireland) Harry Marshall	Splendido
2004	(Switzerland) Beat Grandjean	Riot Gun
2005	(Switzerland) Pierre Kolly	Galopin du Biolay
2006	(Argentina) Ricardo Kierkegaard	Rey Z
2007	(Republic of Ireland) Conor Swail	Rivaal
2008	(United Kingdom) John Whitaker	Utah Van Erpekdm
2009	(France) Patrice Delaveau	Katchina Mail
2010	(Saudi Arabia) Khaled Al-Eid	Presley Boy
2011	(France) Patrice Delaveau	Orient Express
2012	(Republic of Ireland) Trevor Coyle	Jubilee D'Ouilly
2013	(Germany) André Thieme	Contanga 3
2014	(Switzerland) Niklaus Rutschi	Windsor XV
2015	(Netherlands) Henk van de Pol	Willink
2016	(Republic of Ireland) Dermott Lennon	Loughview Lou Lou
2017	(Spain) Gerardo Menéndez	Cassino DC
2018	(Republic of Ireland) Richard Howley	Dolores
2019	(Republic of Ireland) Greg Broderick	Westbrook
2022	(Spain) Kevin González de Zárate	Frappant
2023	(Republic of Ireland) Harry Allen	Calculatus
2024	(Netherlands) Sanne Thijssen	Con Quidam RB
2025	(South Africa) Oliver Lazarus	Conbalthago PS
2026	(United Kingdom) Scott Brash	Hello Folie

== Attendances ==
This is a list of attendances at CSI Gijón.

Edition	Total	High	Low	Average
2014	43,016	9,962	4,986	7,169
2015	44,490	9,842	4,746	7,415
2016	52,206	10,105	5,940	8,701
2017	43,362	9,210	2,263	7,227
2018	46,312	10,897	7,197	9,262
2019	41,712	9,084	6,784	8,342
2024	44,932	11,253		7,489
2025	53,823	12,073	6,224	8,970
