= 2009 CSIO Gijón =

Show jumping event in Gijón, Spain

The 2009 CSIO Gijón was the 2009 edition of the Spanish official show jumping horse show, at Las Mestas Sports Complex in Gijón. It was held as CSIO 5*.

This edition of the CSIO Gijón was held between July 29 and August 3.

== Nations Cup ==
The 2009 FEI Nations Cup of Spain was the fifth competition of the 2009 FEI Nations Cup Promotional League and was held on Saturday, August 1, 2009.

The competition was a show jumping competition with two rounds. The height of the fences were up to 1.60 meters. The best six teams of the eleven which participated were allowed to start in the second round.

The competition was endowed with €61,000.

| | Team | Rider | Horse | Round A | Round B | Total penalties | Jump-off | | Prize money € | scoring points |
| | Team | Rider | Horse | Penalties | Penalties | Total penalties | Penalties | Time (s) | Prize money € | scoring points |
|---|---|---|---|---|---|---|---|---|---|---|
| 1 | France | Patrice Delaveau | Katchina Mail | 8 | 0 | | | | | |
| 1 | France | Clemence Laborde | Ups'n Down Vanden Bandam | 12 | 5 | | | | | |
| 1 | France | Simon Delestre | Melodie Ardente | 0 | 0 | | | | | |
| 1 | France | Jean Marc Nicolas | JPC Modesto | 4 | did not start | | | | | |
| 1 | France | | | 12 | 5 | 17 | | | | - |
| 2 | Germany | Mario Stevens | Mac Kinley | 4 | 4 | | | | | |
| 2 | Germany | Felix Haßmann | Horse Gym's Carefina | 24 | 24 | | | | | |
| 2 | Germany | Holger Hetzel | Lanzarote | 1 | 4 | | | | | |
| 2 | Germany | Gilbert Böckmann | No Father's Girl | 8 | 4 | | | | | |
| 2 | Germany | | | 13 | 12 | 25 | | | | - |
| 2 | Norway | Stein Endresen | Hoyo de Monterrey | 8 | 0 | | | | | |
| 2 | Norway | Morten Djupvik | Bessemeind's Quasimodo Z | 20 | E | | | | | |
| 2 | Norway | Geir Gulliksen | Cattani | 1 | 8 | | | | | |
| 2 | Norway | Tony Andre Hansen | Brokers Rhani de Puuvil | 8 | 0 | | | | | |
| 2 | Norway | | | 17 | 8 | 25 | | | | - |
| 4 | Ireland | Dermot Lennon | Hallmark Elite | 8 | 4 | | | | | |
| 4 | Ireland | Jessica Kürten | Castle Forbes La Vie Du Fraigne | 12 | 8 | | | | | |
| 4 | Ireland | Billy Twomey | Blue Thunder | 4 | 8 | | | | | |
| 4 | Ireland | Conor Swail | Golddigger | 8 | 4 | | | | | |
| 4 | Ireland | | | 20 | 16 | 36 | | | | - |
| 4 | Great Britain | Sophie Fawcett | Orion II | 4 | 28 | | | | | |
| 4 | Great Britain | Gemma Paternoster | Osiris | 4 | 4 | | | | | |
| 4 | Great Britain | Gemma Johnsey Plumley | Lutine du Charmoie | 10 | 8 | | | | | |
| 4 | Great Britain | Scott Brash | Hello Intertoy Z | 4 | 12 | | | | | |
| 4 | Great Britain | | | 12 | 24 | 36 | | | | - |
| 6 | Spain | Alfredo Fernández Durán | Ranino | 0 | 4 | | | | | |
| 6 | Spain | Sergio Álvarez Moya | Action Breaker | 17 | 8 | | | | | |
| 6 | Spain | Jesús Garmendia | Lord du Mont Milon | 4 | 8 | | | | | |
| 6 | Spain | Manuel Fernández Saro | Romanee Banco Bel Bajio | E | 23 | | | | | |
| 6 | Spain | | | 21 | 20 | 41 | | | | - |
| 7 | Belgium | Jérôme Guery | Waldo | 15 | | | | | | |
| 7 | Belgium | Gudrun Patteet | Monark du Marronnet | 4 | | | | | | |
| 7 | Belgium | Bert Prouve | Hugo du Heup | 16 | | | | | | |
| 7 | Belgium | Gilbert Deroock | Lester Vador | 4 | | | | | | |
| 7 | Belgium | | | 23 | | | | | | 12 |
| 8 | Switzerland | Claudia Gisler | Touchable | 5 | | | | | | |
| 8 | Switzerland | Sabrina Crotta | Landquick | 16 | | | | | | |
| 8 | Switzerland | Fabio Crotta | Horizon du Roc | 16 | | | | | | |
| 8 | Switzerland | Markus Hauri | Boccaccio | 12 | | | | | | |
| 8 | Switzerland | | | 33 | | | | | | - |
| 9 | Netherlands | Leon Thijssen | Tyson | 4 | | | | | | |
| 9 | Netherlands | Roelof Bril | Calover | 19 | | | | | | |
| 9 | Netherlands | Mathijs van Asten | VDL Groep Castella | 12 | | | | | | |
| 9 | Netherlands | Henk van de Pol | Rhodos | R | | | | | | |
| 9 | Netherlands | | | 35 | | | | | | - |
| 10 | Portugal | Antonio Vozone | Lacy Woman | 13 | | | | | | |
| 10 | Portugal | Francisco Moura | Undiamo | 12 | | | | | | |
| 10 | Portugal | João Mota | Hortensia d'Elle | E | | | | | | |
| 10 | Portugal | Francisco Rocha | Quick vd Breemeerseen | 13 | | | | | | |
| 10 | Portugal | | | 38 | | | | | | - |

Grey penalties points do not count for the team result.

== Gijón Grand Prix ==
The Gijón Grand Prix, the Show jumping Grand Prix of the 2010 CSIO Gijón, was the major show jumping competition at this event. It was held on 3 August 2009. The competition was a show jumping competition over two rounds, the height of the fences were up to 1.60 meters.

It was endowed with €135,000.

| | Rider | Horse | Round 1 | Round 2 | | Total penalties | prize money |
| | Rider | Horse | Penalties | Penalties | Time (s) | Total penalties | prize money |
|---|---|---|---|---|---|---|---|
| 1 | (France) Patrice Delaveau | Katchina Mail | 0 | 1 | 62.06 | 1 | €45,000 |
| 2 | (Netherlands) Leon Thijssen | Tyson | 4 | 0 | 53.63 | 4 | €30,850 |
| 3 | (France) Simon Delestre | Melodie Ardente | 4 | 0 | 55.76 | 4 | €19,750 |
| 4 | (Spain) Jesús Garmendia | Lord du Mont Milon | 4 | 0 | 56.53 | 4 | €13,300 |
| 5 | (United Kingdom) Robert Whitaker | Draco | 4 | 0 | 56.80 | 4 | €7,750 |
| 6 | (Belgium) Gilbert Deroock | Lester Vador | 4 | 3 | 67.84 | 7 | €5,400 |
| 7 | (Republic of Ireland) Billy Twomey | Montanus Colorado | 8 | 0 | 53.58 | 8 | €3,950 |
| 8 | (France) Michel Robert | Kellemoi de Pepita | 8 | 0 | 53.64 | 8 | €3,400 |
| 9 | (Austria) Thomas Frühmann | The Sixth Sense | 8 | 0 | 54.79 | 8 | €1,400 |
| 10 | (Belgium) Jérôme Guery | Waldo | 8 | 0 | 56.87 | 8 | €1,400 |

(Top 10 of 45 Competitors)
