= 2004 CSIO Gijón =

Show jumping event in Gijón, Spain

The 2004 CSIO Gijón was the 2004 edition of the Spanish official show jumping horse show, at Las Mestas Sports Complex in Gijón. It was held as CSIO 5*.

This edition of the CSIO Gijón was held between 27 August to 4 September.

== Nations Cup ==
The competition was a show jumping competition with two rounds. The height of the fences were up to 1.60 meters. The best six teams of the eleven which participated were allowed to start in the second round.

The competition was endowed with €60,000.

In bold, riders that contested the jump-off.

	Team	Rider	Horse	Round A	Round B	Total penalties	Jump-off		Prize money €
	Team	Rider	Horse	Penalties	Penalties	Total penalties	Penalties	Time (s)	Prize money €
1	France	Ludovic Leygue	Diabolo du Parc II	0	4				
1	France	**Bernard Sainsardos**	Dester de la Lande	0	4				
1	France	Marie Pellegrin	Ice d'Ancoeur	4	4				
1	France	Robert Breul	Flushin	R	8				
1	France			**4**	**12**	16	0	35.16	€ 19,000
2	Mexico	Santiago Lambre	Imperio Rouge	0	0				
2	Mexico	Gerardo Tazzer	Scapino Channel	8	8				
2	Mexico	Gustavo Ramos	Minotauro	4	8				
2	Mexico	**Federico Fernández Senderos**	Bohemio	0	4				
2	Mexico			**4**	**12**	16	4	36.21	€ 13,000
3	Netherlands	**Leon Thijssen**	Nairobi	0	4				
3	Netherlands	Wiljan Laarakkers	Lois-Lane	5	8				
3	Netherlands	Jur Vrieling	Greve Molke	4	4				
3	Netherlands	Harry Smolders	Oliver Q	0	4				
3	Netherlands			**4**	**12**	16	4	37.01	€ 10,500
4	Spain	Rutherford Latham	Galoubette Mondain	0	8				
4	Spain	Luis Álvarez de Cervera	Masdecaballos Maestro	9	4				
4	Spain	Jesús Garmendia	Espoir de la Haye	12	8				
4	Spain	Manuel Fernández Saro	Cattani 17	0	0				
4	Spain			**9**	**12**	21			€ 8,000
5	Germany	Pia-Luise Aufrecht	Hofgut Liederbach's Ingmar	4	4				
5	Germany	Holger Wenz	Katango 9	8	8				
5	Germany	Carsten Averkamp	Pik'o Pur	4	8				
5	Germany	Toni Hassmann	Forsyth FRH	4	12				
5	Germany			**12**	**20**	32			€ 5,500
6	Portugal	João Mota	Volvo XC 90	16	21				
6	Portugal	António Portela	Echo de Lessay	0	4				
6	Portugal	Rui Gonçalo	Fakir de Croisy	20	12				
6	Portugal	Francisco Rocha	Vila Vita Quick VD Bermm	0	R				
6	Portugal			**16**	**37**	53			€ 4,000
7	Belgium	Jean-Claude Vangeenberghe	Osta Rugs Tresor	8					
7	Belgium	Kristof Cleeren	Capriola van de Helle	4					
7	Belgium	Gilbert de Roock	Goldfinger Gerbaux	8					
7	Belgium	Grégory Wathelet	Lady des Hayettes	12					
7	Belgium			**20**					
8	Norway	Anita Sande	Grandino 25	12					
8	Norway	Ingrid Laerdal	Welten Z Enemaerke	8					
8	Norway	Kristi Svaboe	Gimini	16					
8	Norway	Toni Andre Hansen	ET Royal Volo	4					
8	Norway			**24**					
9	Great Britain	John Whitaker	Gem of India	5					
9	Great Britain	Robert Maguire	Two Mills Show Time	8					
9	Great Britain	Robert Bevis	Hosire des Chaînes	20					
9	Great Britain	Michael Whitaker	Portofino 63	12					
9	Great Britain			**25**					
10	Switzerland	Philippe Putallaz	L'Amie	12					
10	Switzerland	Daniel Etter	Hermine d'Auzay	12					
10	Switzerland	Pierre Kolly	Galopin du Biolay	12					
10	Switzerland	Beat Grandjean	Riot Gun	NP					
10	Switzerland			**36**					

Grey penalties points do not count for the team result.

== Gijón Grand Prix ==
The Gijón Grand Prix, the Show jumping Grand Prix of the 2004 CSIO Gijón, was the major show jumping competition at this event. It was held on 2 August 2004. The competition was a show jumping competition over one round with tie-break for the riders that made 0 points in the main round, the height of the fences were up to 1.60 meters.

It was endowed with €91,500 .

	Rider	Horse	Round 1		Round 2		prize money
	Rider	Horse	Penalties	Time (s)	Penalties	Time (s)	prize money
1	(Switzerland) Beat Grandjean	Riot Gun	0	79.99	0	39.53	€30,000
2	(France) Michel Hécart	Kannan	0	79.20	0	40.36	€21,000
3	(Mexico) Santiago Lambre	Imperio Rouge	0	81.99	0	42.43	€13,500
4	(Netherlands) Jur Vrieling	Greve Molke	0	78.22	0	44.62	€9,000
5	(France) Ludovic Leygue	Diabolo du Parc II	0	82.94	4	39.10	€5,100
6	(Mexico) Federico Fernández Senderos	Bohemio	0	80.71	4	40.77	€3,600
7	(Germany) Pia-Luise Aufrecht	Hofgut Liederbach's Ingmar	0	78.93	4	45.56	€2,400
8	(United Kingdom) Michael Whitaker	Portofino 63	1	83.80			€2,100
9	(Belgium) Kristof Cleeren	Capriola van de Helle	4	76.45			€1,800
10	(Belgium) Grégory Wathelet	Lady des Hayettes	4	76.76			€1,500

(Top 10 of 48 Competitors)
