= 2018 CSIO Gijón =

The 2018 CSIO Gijón was the 2018 edition of the Spanish official show jumping horse show, at Las Mestas Sports Complex in Gijón. It was held as CSIO 5*.

This edition of the CSIO Gijón was held between 29 August and 2 September.

== Nations Cup ==
The Cup was a show jumping competition with two rounds, held on 31 August. The height of the fences were up to 1.60 meters. The best eight teams of the eleven which participated were allowed to start in the second round. The competition was endowed with €72,500. Seven years after their last success, Spain won its 4th Nations Cup in Gijón.

In bold, riders that contested the jump-off.

	Team	Rider	Horse	Round 1	Round 2	Total penalties	Jump-off		Prize money
	Team	Rider	Horse	Penalties	Penalties	Total penalties	Penalties	Time (s)	Prize money
1	Spain	Manuel Fernández Saro	Usador du Rouet	4	4				
1	Spain	Mikel Aizpurua	Cartanya	4	4				
1	Spain	Laura Roquet	Sandi Puigroq	4	8				
1	Spain	**Eduardo Álvarez Aznar**	Seringat	0	0				
1	Spain			**8**	**4**	12	0	42.37	€24,000
2	Italy	Antonio Alfonso	Redskin de Riverland	4	4				
2	Italy	**Lucia Le Jeune Vizzini**	Cabalgaro Z	8	0				
2	Italy	Emanuele Camilli	Urban de Rohan	4	0				
2	Italy	Riccardo Pisani	Chaclot	0	4				
2	Italy			**4**	**8**	12	4	41.36	€16,000
3	Netherlands	Lisa Nooren	VDL Groep Sabech d'HA	4	4				
3	Netherlands	Sanne Thijssen	Expert	0	4				
3	Netherlands	**Leon Thijssen**	Cristello 2	4	8				
3	Netherlands	Doron Kuipers	Charley	0	0				
3	Netherlands			**4**	**8**	12	4	42.04	€11,000
4	Sweden	Linda Heed	Jarvis Van D Abelendreef	5	0				
4	Sweden	Marcus Westergren	Calmere	4	8				
4	Sweden	Erica Swartz	Jovita	8	0				
4	Sweden	Irma Karlsson	Chacconu	4	0				
4	Sweden			**13**	**0**	13			€6,000
4	Ireland	Trevor Breen	Bombay	8	4				
4	Ireland	Richard Howley	Dolores	4	0				
4	Ireland	Michael Duffy	Efs Top Contender	1	0				
4	Ireland	Anthony Condon	Sfs Aristio	4	4				
4	Ireland			**9**	**4**	13			€6,000
6	Great Britain	Ellen Whitaker	Arena UK Winston	0	5				
6	Great Britain	Jamie Gornall	Christian 25	9	8				
6	Great Britain	Julie Andrews	Ayrton IV	4	8				
6	Great Britain	Harry Charles	Abc Quantum Cruise	0	0				
6	Great Britain			**4**	**13**	17			€4,500
7	Belgium	Gilles Dunon	Fou de Toi Vd Keihoeve	0	8				
7	Belgium	Annelies Vorsselmans	Wilandro 3	0	4				
7	Belgium	Virginie Thonon	High Tech Vy de Septon	E	16				
7	Belgium	Rick Hemeryck	Ulyss Morinda	8	4				
7	Belgium			**8**	**16**	24			€2,500
8	France	Jacques Helmlinger	Tonic des Mets	0	4				
8	France	Bruno Garez	United Sunheup	14	8				
8	France	Émeric George	Chopin des Hayettes	12	8				
8	France	Felicie Bertrand	Sultane des Ibis	0	4				
8	France			**12**	**16**	28			€2,500
9	Portugal	Duarte Seabra	Fernhill Curra Quinn	4					
9	Portugal	Hugo Carvalho	Extraordiner	12					
9	Portugal	Luis Sabino Gonçalves	Acheo di San Patrignano	0					
9	Portugal	António Matos Almeida	Nikel de Presle	9					
9	Portugal			**13**					
10	Germany	Michael Kölz	Dsp Anpowikapi	8					
10	Germany	Jörne Sprehe	Stakki's Jumper	0					
10	Germany	Marcel Marschall	Utopia 48	8					
10	Germany	Thomas Kleis	Chades of Blue	8					
10	Germany			**16**					

== Gijón Grand Prix ==
The Gijón Grand Prix, the Show jumping Grand Prix of the 2018 CSIO Gijón, was the major show jumping competition at this event. The sponsor of this competition was Funeraria Gijonesa. It was held on Sunday, 2 September 2018. The competition was a show jumping competition over two rounds, the height of the fences were up to 1.60 meters.

It was endowed with 145,700 €. Richard Howley won the trophy.

	Rider	Horse	Round 1	Round 2		Total penalties	prize money
	Rider	Horse	Penalties	Penalties	Time (s)	Total penalties	prize money
1	(Republic of Ireland) Richard Howley	Dolores	0	0	59.86	0	47,850 €
2	(Belgium) Gilles Dunon	Fou de Toi vd Keihoeve	0	0	61.31	0	29,000 €
3	(Netherlands) Doron Kuipers	Charley	0	0	63.47	0	21,750 €
4	(Brazil) Stephan de Freitas Barcha	Artois d'Avillon	0	0	63.80	0	14,500 €
5	(Spain) Eduardo Álvarez Aznar	Seringat	0	4	56.77	4	8,700 €
6	(France) Kevin Staut	For Joy Van'T Zorgvliet Hdc	0	4	59.35	4	6,525 €
7	(Italy) Riccardo Pisani	Chaclot	0	4	59.43	4	4,350 €
8	(United Kingdom) Alison Barton	Roma IV	0	4	60.74	4	3,625 €
9	(Belgium) Annelies Vorsselmans	Wilandro 3	0	4	61.28	4	2,900 €
10	(Spain) Manuel Fernández Saro	Usador du Rouet	0	4	61.75	4	2,900 €

(Top 10 of 50 Competitors)

== Winners by day ==
Day	Att.	Total prize (€)	Height	Winner	Horse	Results
Wednesday 29	7,197	5,080	1.40	(Portugal) António Matos Almeida	Irene van de Kwachthoeve	
Wednesday 29	7,197	24,850	1.50	(Republic of Ireland) Billy Twomey	Diaghilev	
Thursday 30	8,965	5,120	1.40	(Germany) Michael Kölz	Dubai Blh	
Thursday 30	8,965	50,400	1.50	(Republic of Ireland) Paul Kennedy	Cartown Danger Mouse	
Friday 31	9,764	72,000	1.60	Spain		
Friday 31	9,764	7,500	1.40	(Germany) Jörne Sprehe	Solero 79	
Saturday 1	9,489	5,040	1.40	(Republic of Ireland) Richard Howley	Cruising Star	
Saturday 1	9,489	93,700	1.60	(Republic of Ireland) Billy Twomey	Kimba Flamenco	
Sunday 2	10,897	5,080	1.40	(Luxembourg) Victor Bettendorf	Colchique du Gibet	
Sunday 2	10,897	145,700	1.60	(Republic of Ireland) Richard Howley	Dolores	
