= 2006 CSIO Gijón =

Show jumping event in Gijón, Spain

The 2006 CSIO Gijón was the 2006 edition of the Spanish official show jumping horse show, at Las Mestas Sports Complex in Gijón. It was held as CSIO 5*.

This edition of the CSIO Gijón was held between 2 and 7 August.

== Nations Cup ==
The competition was a show jumping competition with two rounds. The height of the fences were up to 1.60 meters. The best six teams were allowed to start in the second round.

The competition was endowed with €61,000.

	Team	Rider	Horse	Round A	Round B	Total penalties	Jump-off		Prize money €
	Team	Rider	Horse	Penalties	Penalties	Total penalties	Penalties	Time (s)	Prize money €
1	France	Florian Angot	First de Launay HN	4	0				
1	France	Laurent Goffinet	Flipper d'Elle HN	4	4				
1	France	Hervé Godignon	Obélix	0	8				
1	France	Michel Robert	Galet d'Auzay	12	0				
1	France			8	4	12			€ 20,000
2	Spain	Rutherford Latham	Guarana Champeix	0	9				
2	Spain	Ricardo Jurado	Procasa Le Monde	4	8				
2	Spain	Sergio Álvarez Moya	Le Reve du Nabab	4	8				
2	Spain	Manuel Fernández Saro	Quin-Chin	4	0				
2	Spain			8	16	24			€ 13,000
3	Great Britain	Ellen Whitaker	AK Locarno 62	4	4				
3	Great Britain	Robert Whitaker	Nepos Van Limbo	0	8				
3	Great Britain	Robert Maguire	Overa	4	15				
3	Great Britain	Duncan Inglis	Sunkist	9	NP				
3	Great Britain			8	27	35			€ 10,500
4	United States	Joie Gatlin	Suncal's King	4	8				
4	United States	Jenni Martin	V de Pomme	9	12				
4	United States	Susan Artes	Presto B	E	NP				
4	United States	Francie Steindwell-Carvin	Ness-Go	14	8				
4	United States			27	28	55			€ 8,000
5	Netherlands	Eric van der Vleuten	Paloma	4	8				
5	Netherlands	Jur Vrieling	Nerina	18	E				
5	Netherlands	Maikel van der Vleuten	Naomie	16	17				
5	Netherlands	Emile Tacken	Miss Montana	8	8				
5	Netherlands			28	34	62			€ 5,000
6	Belgium	Ludo Philippaerts	Chatman	8	4				
6	Belgium	Yves Simon	Mazarin des Perees	5	4				
6	Belgium	Koen Vereecke	Suleyman de Wulf Selection	12	E				
6	Belgium	François Mathy Jr.	Ivoire du Rouet	4	E				
6	Belgium			17	NQ	NQ			€ 4,000
7	Italy	Omar Bonomelli	Quintero 4	8					
7	Italy	Jonella Ligresti	Nanta	E					
7	Italy	Giuseppe Rolli	Jericho de la Vie	9					
7	Italy	Emilio Bicocchi	Kapitol d'Argonne	13					
7	Italy			30					
8	Germany	Tim Rieskang-Göseking	Casario	16					
8	Germany	Barbara Steuer-Collee	Wandel de l'Oeuf CH	12					
8	Germany	Caroline Müller	Kyraleen	8					
8	Germany	Toni Hassmann	Classic H	12					
8	Germany			32					

Grey penalties points do not count for the team result.

== Gijón Grand Prix ==
The Gijón Grand Prix, the Show jumping Grand Prix of the 2006 CSIO Gijón, was the major show jumping competition at this event. It was held on 7 August 2006. The competition was a show jumping competition over two rounds, the height of the fences were up to 1.60 meters.

It was endowed with €128,450 .

	Rider	Horse	Round 1	Round 2		Total penalties	prize money
	Rider	Horse	Penalties	Penalties	Time (s)	Total penalties	prize money
1	(Argentina) Ricardo Kierkegaard	Rey Z (ex Prince de Revel)	0	0	55.80	0	€42,000
2	(Netherlands) Jur Vrieling	Nerina	0	0	56.96	0	€28,800
3	(Italy) Giuseppe Rolli	Jericho de la Vie	0	0	59.43	0	€18,500
4	(France) Michel Robert	Galet d'Auzay	0	0	59.67	0	€12,300
5	(Spain) Luis Jesús Escobar	Kairos de Croche	0	0	60.55	0	€7,250
6	(New Zealand) Grant Wilson	Up and Down Cellebroedersbos	0	0	65.35	0	€5,050
7	(Belgium) François Mathy Jr.	Ivoire du Rouet	0	4	58.96	4	€3,700
8	(Italy) Jonella Ligresti	Quinta 27	1	5	75.90	6	€3,200
9	(United States) Joie Gatlin	Suncal's King	4	4	59.99	8	€2,750
10	(Belgium) Koen Vereecke	Suleyman de Wulf Selection	0	8	65.00	8	€2,450

(Top 10 of 47 Competitors)
