= 2007 CSIO Gijón =

Show jumping event in Gijón, Spain

The 2007 CSIO Gijón was the 2007 edition of the Spanish official show jumping horse show, at Las Mestas Sports Complex in Gijón. It was held as CSIO 5*.

This edition of the CSIO Gijón was held between August 25 and September 2.

== Nations Cup ==
The 2007 FEI Nations Cup of Spain was the fifth competition of the 2007 Samsung Super League and was held on Saturday, August 31, 2007.

The competition was a show jumping competition with two rounds. The height of the fences were up to 1.60 meters. The best six teams of the eleven which participated were allowed to start in the second round.

The competition was endowed with €60,900.

	Team	Rider	Horse	Round A	Round B	Total penalties	Jump-off		Prize money €	scoring points
	Team	Rider	Horse	Penalties	Penalties	Total penalties	Penalties	Time (s)	Prize money €	scoring points
1	France	Robert Breul	Iasco Mouch	0	4					
1	France	Timothé Anciaume	Jarnac	12	0					
1	France	Jérôme Debas Montagner	Idem de B'Neville	4	8					
1	France	Julien Épaillard	Icare du Manet	0	DNS					
1	France			4	12	16			€ 20,000	-
2	Italy	Emilio Bicocchi	Jeckerson Kapitol d'Argonne	4	4					
2	Italy	Giulia Martinengo	Comtess III	8	12					
2	Italy	Piergiorgio Bucci	Da Zara Don Diego	19	0					
2	Italy	Juan Carlos Garcia	Albin III	0	4					
2	Italy			12	8	20			€ 11,750	-
2	Netherlands	Henk van de Pol	Rhodos	4	0					
2	Netherlands	Roelof Bril	Snowland	4	4					
2	Netherlands	Mathijs Van Asten	Castella	4	4					
2	Netherlands	Jur Vrieling	VDL Emmerton	4	8					
2	Netherlands			12	8	20			€ 11,750	-
4	Ireland	Capt. Shane Carey	River Foyle	9	16					
4	Ireland	Conor Swail	Rivaal	4	0					
4	Ireland	Cian O'Connor	Irish Independent Echo Beach	0	0					
4	Ireland	Capt. Gerry Flynn	Mo Chroi	4	18					
4	Ireland			8	16	24			€ 8,000	-
5	Belgium	Ludo Philippaerts	Sam	4	4					
5	Belgium	Koen Vereecke	Utopia vd Donkhoeve	8	4					
5	Belgium	François Mathy Jr.	Ivore du Rouet	8	4					
5	Belgium	Philippe Le Jeune	Vigo D Arsouilles	4	4					
5	Belgium			16	12	28			€ 5,400	-
6	Germany	Anna-Maria Jakobs	Georgenhof's Lausejunge	0	4					
6	Germany	Stefan Abt	Wandel de l'Oeuf CH	8	16					
6	Germany	Henrik Griese	Pariton	12	8					
6	Germany	Andreas Knippling	Neolisto van het Mierenhof	8	4					
6	Germany			16	16	32			€ 4,000	-
7	Great Britain	Robert Bevis	Wexford	9						
7	Great Britain	James Davenport	For Fun II	8						
7	Great Britain	Tina Fletcher	Overa	4						
7	Great Britain	David McPherson	Pilgrim II	16						
7	Great Britain			21						
8	Spain	Luis Jesús Escobar	Kairos de Croche	12						
8	Spain	Paola Amilibia	Cabri d'Elle	16						
8	Spain	Gonzalo Testa	MME Pompadour M	4						
8	Spain	Sergio Álvarez Moya	Le Reve du Nabab	8						
8	Spain			24						-
9	Portugal	António Portela	Echo de Lessay	12						
9	Portugal	Marina Frutuoso de Melo	Coltaire Z	8						
9	Portugal	João Mota	Miss Horservice	16						
9	Portugal	Antonio Vozone	Lacy Woman	9						
9	Portugal			29						-

Grey penalties points do not count for the team result.

== Gijón Grand Prix ==
The Gijón Grand Prix, the Show jumping Grand Prix of the 2007 CSIO Gijón, was the major show jumping competition at this event. It was held on 2 September 2007. The competition was a show jumping competition over two rounds, the height of the fences were up to 1.60 meters.

It was endowed with €135,000.

	Rider	Horse	Round 1	Round 2		Total penalties	prize money
	Rider	Horse	Penalties	Penalties	Time (s)	Total penalties	prize money
1	(Republic of Ireland) Conor Swail	Rivaal	0	0	52.47	0	€42,000
2	(Belgium) Philippe Le Jeune	Vigo D Arsouilles	0	0	52.70	0	€28,800
3	(France) Timothé Anciaume	Jarnac	1	0	54.42	1	€18,500
4	(United Kingdom) Tina Fletcher	Overa	0	1	64.42	1	€12,300
5	(Spain) Luis Jesús Escobar	Kairos de Croche	0	4	50.63	4	€7,250
6	(Belgium) Anna-Maria Jakobs	Georgenhof's Lausejunge	0	4	50.87	4	€5,050
7	(Spain) Rutherford Latham	Guarana Champeix	0	4	51.35	4	€3,700
8	(Netherlands) Mathijs van Asten	VDL Groep Kwindanta van de Laar	0	4	51.97	4	€3,200
9	(France) Michel Robert	Koro d'Or	0	4	49.87	4	€2,750
10	(Australia) Matthew Williams	Leconte 6	0	8	52.43	8	€2,450

(Top 10 of 41 Competitors)
