= 2016 CSIO Gijón =

The 2016 CSIO Gijón was the 2016 edition of the Spanish official show jumping horse show, at Las Mestas Sports Complex in Gijón. It was held as CSIO 5*.

This edition of the CSIO Gijón was held between 24 and 29 August 2016.

== Nations Cup ==
The 2016 Furussiyia FEI Nations Cup of Spain was part of the European Division 2 in the 2016 Furussiya FEI Nations Cup and was held on Saturday, 2 September 2016. Great Britain was the only team that could win points for the ranking.

The Cup was a show jumping competition with two rounds. The height of the fences were up to 1.60 meters. The best eight teams of the eleven which participated were allowed to start in the second round. The competition was endowed with €76,000. France won its 11th Nations Cup in Gijón.

	Team	Rider	Horse	Round 1	Round 2	Total penalties	Jump-off		Prize money	scoring points
	Team	Rider	Horse	Penalties	Penalties	Total penalties	Penalties	Time (s)	Prize money	scoring points
1	Great Britain	Tim Stockdale	Fleur de l'Aube	0	4					
1	Great Britain	Joe Whitaker	Lola	8	12					
1	Great Britain	Samuel Hutton	Happydam	0	8					
1	Great Britain	Robert Bevis	Courtney Z	4	0					
1	Great Britain			4	12	16			€ 24,000	
2	Spain	Eduardo Álvarez Aznar	Fidux	5	0					
2	Spain	Armando Trapote	Macao	4	12					
2	Spain	Gerardo Menéndez	Cassino DC	12	0					
2	Spain	Sergio Álvarez Moya	Arrayán	8	0					
2	Spain			17	0	17			€ 16,000	
3	Netherlands	Doron Kuipers	Zinius	4	0					
3	Netherlands	Roelof Bril	Arlando	4	4					
3	Netherlands	Charlotte Verhagen	Abache HL	13	16					
3	Netherlands	Sanne Thijssen	Captain Cooper	8	0					
3	Netherlands			16	4	20			€ 12,000	
4	Switzerland	Nadja Peter-Steiner	Capuera II	8	0					
4	Switzerland	Claudia Gisler	Corder	4	4					
4	Switzerland	Vladya Reverdin	Edison	5	4					
4	Switzerland	Christina Liebherr	LB Eagle Eye	5	8					
4	Switzerland			14	8	22			€ 8,000	
5	Canada	Elizabeth Gingras	Zilversprings	0	0					
5	Canada	Vanessa Manix	Grand Cru vd Vijf Eiken	4	8					
5	Canada	Kara Chad	Gin Tonic vd Haagakkers	16	8					
5	Canada	Eric Lamaze	Check Picobello Z	8	4					
5	Canada			12	12	24			€ 5,000	
6	Italy	Luca Maria Monetta	Connery	9	4					
6	Italy	Paolo Paini	Ottava Meraviglia di Ca' San G	4	4					
6	Italy	Antonio Alfonso	Redskin de Riverland	E	4					
6	Italy	Juan Carlos Garcia	Gitano v Berkenbroeck	4	0					
6	Italy			17	8	25			€ 5,000	
7	France	Bernard Briand Chevalier	Qadillac du Heup	12	4					
7	France	Harold Boisset	Quolita Z	8	4					
7	France	Frédéric David	Equador van't Roosakker	8	5					
7	France	Julien Épaillard	Quatrin de la Roque LM	0	R					
7	France			16	13	29			€ 3,000	
8	Ireland	Cian O'Connor	Callisto	9	0					
8	Ireland	Anthony Condon	Aristio	4	16					
8	Ireland	Conor Swail	Hetman of Colors	4	12					
8	Ireland	Billy Twomey	Diaghilev	12	8					
8	Ireland			17	20	37			€ 3,000	
9	Egypt	Sameh El Dahan	WKD Diva	4						
9	Egypt	Mohamed Talaat	Connaught	9						
9	Egypt	Abdel Said	California	4						
9	Egypt			17						
10	Mexico	Nicolás Pizarro	Temascaltepec	12						
10	Mexico	Alberto Michán	Gigola van de Broekkant	4						
10	Mexico	Antonio Chedraui	Ninloubet	5						
10	Mexico	Federico Fernández Senderos	Guru	12						
10	Mexico			21						
11	Portugal	Duarte Seabra	Fernhill Curra Quinn	4						
11	Portugal	João Chuva	Antonio	13						
11	Portugal	António Matos Almeida	Nikel de Presle	E						
11	Portugal	Luis Sabino Gonçalves	Filou Imperio Egipcio	8						
11	Portugal			25						
12	Norway	Victoria Gulliksen	Viego les Hauts	17						
12	Norway	Marie Longem Valdar	Algorhythem	4						
12	Norway	Benedikte Endresen	Comic	13						
12	Norway	Cecilie Hatteland	Alex	R						
12	Norway			34						

== Gijón Grand Prix ==
The Gijón Grand Prix, the Show jumping Grand Prix of the 2016 CSIO Gijón, was the major show jumping competition at this event. The sponsor of this competition was Banco Sabadell Herrero. It was held on Monday 29 August 2016. The competition was a show jumping competition over two rounds, the height of the fences were up to 1.60 meters.

It was endowed with 153,701 €.

	Rider	Horse	Round 1	Round 2		Total penalties	prize money
	Rider	Horse	Penalties	Penalties	Time (s)	Total penalties	prize money
1	(Republic of Ireland) Dermott Lennon	Loughview Lou Lou	0	0	55.07	0	50,721 €
2	(Egypt) Abdel Said	California	0	0	55.94	0	30,740 €
3	(France) Bernard Briand Chevalier	Qadillac du Heup	0	0	56.94	0	23,055 €
4	(Netherlands) Sanne Thijssen	Con Quidam RB	0	0	66.25	0	15,370 €
5	(Switzerland) Claudia Gisler	Cordel	0	0	66.37	0	9,200 €
6	(Mexico) Antonio Chedraui	Ninloubet	0	0	66.76	0	6,917 €
7	(Republic of Ireland) Cian O'Connor	Good Luck	0	4	56.60	4	4,611 €
8	(Canada) Eric Lamaze	Picobello	0	4	61.04	4	3,843 €
9	(Spain) Alberto Márquez	Sothebys PC de Ganex	1	6	73.59	7	3,074 €
10	(Belgium) Grégory Whatelet	Corée	4	8	55.47	12	3,074 €

(Top 10 of 45 Competitors)

== Winners by day ==
Day	Att.	Total prize (€)	Height	Winner	Horse	Results
Wednesday 24	5,940	7,710	1.40	(Mexico) Antonio Chedraui	Corcega La Silla	
Wednesday 24	5,940	24,750	1.50	(Saudi Arabia) Abdullah Al-Sharbatly	Talan	
Thursday 25	9,965	7,621	1.40	(France) Julien Épaillard	Sheriff de la Nutria LM	
Thursday 25	9,965	62,320	1.60	(Egypt) Abdel Said	Hope van Scherpen Donder	
Friday 26	8,110	24,750	1.50	(Saudi Arabia) Abdullah Al-Sharbatly	Domingo	
Friday 26	8,110	24,600	1.45	(France) Julien Épaillard	Sheriff de la Nutria LM	
Saturday 27	9,421	76,000	1.60	Great Britain		
Saturday 27	9,421	24,600	1.45	(France) Julien Épaillard	Sheriff de la Nutria LM	
Sunday 28	8,665	9,000	1.40	(United Kingdom) Robert Smith	Cimano E	
Sunday 28	8,665	33,360	1.50	(Canada) Elizabeth Gingras	Coup de Chance	
Monday 29	10,105	9,000	1.40	(Netherlands) Sanne Thijssen	Ulena	
Monday 29	10,105	153,701	1.60	(Republic of Ireland) Dermott Lennon	Loughview Lou Lou	
