= 2013 CSIO Gijón =

The 2013 CSIO Gijón was the 2013 edition of the Spanish official show jumping horse show, at Las Mestas Sports Complex in Gijón. It was held as CSIO 5*.

This edition of the CSIO Gijón was held between August 28 and September 2.

== Nations Cup ==
The 2013 FEI Nations Cup of Spain was the sixth competition of the European Division 2 in the 2013 Furusiyya FEI Nations Cup and was held on Saturday, August 31, 2014.

The competition was a show jumping competition with two rounds. The height of the fences were up to 1.60 meters. The best eight teams of the eleven which participated were allowed to start in the second round. The competition was endowed with €67,000.

| | Team | Rider | Horse | Round A | Round B | Total penalties | Jump-off | | Prize money | scoring points |
| | Team | Rider | Horse | Penalties | Penalties | Total penalties | Penalties | Time (s) | Prize money | scoring points |
|---|---|---|---|---|---|---|---|---|---|---|
| 1 | Netherlands | Gert Jan Burggink | PrimeVal Dejavu | 0 | 4 | | | | | |
| 1 | Netherlands | Jur Vrieling | Zirocco Blue VDL | 1 | 4 | | | | | |
| 1 | Netherlands | Frank Schuttert | Winchester HS | 4 | 0 | | | | | |
| 1 | Netherlands | Harrie Smolders | Emerald | 4 | 1 | | | | | |
| 1 | Netherlands | | | 5 | 5 | 10 | | | €21,000 | |
| 2 | (United Kingdom) Great Britain | Daniel Neilson | Zigali PS | 12 | 4 | | | | | |
| 2 | (United Kingdom) Great Britain | Louise Saywell | Hello Winner | 0 | 0 | | | | | |
| 2 | (United Kingdom) Great Britain | Robert Whitaker | Catwalk IV | 0 | 0 | | | | | |
| 2 | (United Kingdom) Great Britain | William Whitaker | Fandango | 8 | 8 | | | | | |
| 2 | (United Kingdom) Great Britain | | | 8 | 4 | 12 | | | €15,000 | |
| 3 | Belgium | Patrik Spits | Whitney vd Dwerse Hagen | 4 | 4 | | | | | |
| 3 | Belgium | Jérôme Guery | Upper Star | 4 | 12 | | | | | |
| 3 | Belgium | Dominique Hendrickx | Cor vd Wateringhoeve | 1 | 9 | | | | | |
| 3 | Belgium | Grégory Whatelet | Papillon Z | 8 | 1 | | | | | |
| 3 | Belgium | | | 9 | 14 | 23 | | | €11,000 | |
| 4 | Italy | Luca Maria Moneta | Connery | 9 | 12 | | | | | |
| 4 | Italy | Luca Marziani | Wivina | 5 | 5 | | | | | |
| 4 | Italy | Francesco Franco | Banca Popolare Bari Cassandra | 20 | 0 | | | | | |
| 4 | Italy | Lorenzo de Luca | Zoe II | 4 | 4 | | | | | |
| 4 | Italy | | | 16 | 9 | 25 | | | €8,000 | |
| 5 | Ireland | Capt. Michael Kelly | Annestown | 4 | 4 | | | | | |
| 5 | Ireland | Bertram Allen | Romanov | 8 | 4 | | | | | |
| 5 | Ireland | Denis Lynch | All Inclusive NRW | 5 | 5 | | | | | |
| 5 | Ireland | Shane Breen | Zarnita | 17 | retired | | | | | |
| 5 | Ireland | | | 17 | 13 | 30 | | | €6,000 | |
| 6 | Germany | Markus Renzel | Cassydy | 12 | 17 | | | | | |
| 6 | Germany | Katrin Eckermann | Firth of Lorne | 4 | 13 | | | | | |
| 6 | Germany | André Thieme | Contanga 3 | 5 | 5 | | | | | |
| 6 | Germany | David Will | Colorit | 4 | 4 | | | | | |
| 6 | Germany | | | 13 | 22 | 35 | | | €6,000 | |
| 7 | Spain | Pilar Lucrecia Cordón | Octavio | 17 | | | | | | |
| 7 | Spain | Carlos López-Fanjul | Conington | 9 | | | | | | |
| 7 | Spain | Rutherford Latham | Nectar du Plessis | 10 | | | | | | |
| 7 | Spain | Sergio Álvarez Moya | Carlo 273 | 0 | | | | | | |
| 7 | Spain | | | 19 | | | | | | |
| 8 | United States | Reed Kessler | Wolf S | 8 | | | | | | |
| 8 | United States | Saer Coutler | Springtime | 12 | | | | | | |
| 8 | United States | Lucy Davis | Barron | 4 | | | | | | |
| 8 | United States | Lauren Hough | Tackeray | 12 | | | | | | |
| 8 | United States | | | 24 | | | | | | |
| 8 | France | Timothée Anciaume | Quorioso Pre Noir | 8 | | | | | | |
| 8 | France | Julien Epaillard | Cristallo A LM | 12 | | | | | | |
| 8 | France | Michel Robert | Oh d'Eole | 20 | | | | | | |
| 8 | France | Simon Delestre | Qlassic Bois Margot | 4 | | | | | | |
| 8 | France | | | 24 | | | | | | |
| 10 | Portugal | Ricardo Gil Santos | Venus C | 21 | | | | | | |
| 10 | Portugal | Hugo Carvalho | Arthos | 12 | | | | | | |
| 10 | Portugal | Ivo Carvalho | Corrabe | 32 | | | | | | |
| 10 | Portugal | Alexandre Mascarenhas | Wannahave | withdrew | | | | | | |
| 10 | Portugal | | | 65 | | | | | | |

== Gijón Grand Prix ==
The Gijón Grand Prix, the Show jumping Grand Prix of the 2014 CSIO Gijón, was the major show jumping competition at this event. The sponsor of this competition was Banco Sabadell Herrero. It was held on Monday 2 August 2013. The competition was a show jumping competition over two rounds, the height of the fences were up to 1.60 meters.

It was endowed with €145,000 .

| | Rider | Horse | Round 1 | Round 2 | | Total penalties | prize money |
| | Rider | Horse | Penalties | Penalties | Time (s) | Total penalties | prize money |
|---|---|---|---|---|---|---|---|
| 1 | (Germany) André Thieme | Contanga 3 | 0 | 0 | 52.30 | 0 | €47,850 |
| 2 | (France) Simon Delestre | Qlassic Bois Margot | 0 | 1 | 53.52 | 1 | €29,000 |
| 3 | (United Kingdom) Daniel Neilson | Zigali P S | 0 | 1 | 55.04 | 1 | €21,750 |
| 4 | (Netherlands) Frank Schuttert | Winchester HS | 4 | 0 | 47.54 | 4 | €14,500 |
| 5 | (Republic of Ireland) Bertram Allen | Romanov | 4 | 0 | 48.86 | 4 | €8,700 |
| 6 | (France) Patrice Delaveau | Carinjo HDC | 4 | 0 | 49.77 | 4 | €6,525 |
| 7 | (Azerbaijan) Jamal Rahimov | Warrior | 1 | 5 | 54.36 | 6 | €4,350 |
| 8 | (Netherlands) Jur Vrieling | Zirocco Blue VDL | 1 | 7 | 61.10 | 8 | €3,625 |
| 9 | (Italy) Marta Bottanelli | Risolde | 1 | 9 | 56.25 | 10 | €2,900 |
| 10 | (Belgium) Jérôme Guery | Upper Star | 4 | 9 | 54.11 | 13 | €2,900 |

(Top 10 of 44 Competitors)
