= 2015 CSIO Gijón =

The 2015 CSIO Gijón was the 2015 edition of the Spanish official show jumping horse show, at Las Mestas Sports Complex in Gijón. It was held as CSIO 5*.

This edition of the CSIO Gijón was held between August 26 and 31.

== Nations Cup ==
The 2015 FEI Nations Cup of Spain was the sixth competition of the European Division 2 in the 2014 Furusiyya FEI Nations Cup and was held on Saturday, 30 August 2015. Ukraine was the only team that could win points for the ranking.

The competition was a show jumping competition with two rounds. The height of the fences were up to 1.60 meters. The best eight teams of the eleven which participated were allowed to start in the second round. The competition was endowed with €76,000. France won its tenth Nations Cup.

	Team	Rider	Horse	Round A	Round B	Total penalties	Jump-off		Prize money	scoring points
	Team	Rider	Horse	Penalties	Penalties	Total penalties	Penalties	Time (s)	Prize money	scoring points
1	France	Alexandre Fontanelle	Prime Time des Vagues	0	0					
1	France	Cyril Bouvard	Quasi Modo Z	4	E					
1	France	Adeline Hécart	Pasha du Gue	0	4					
1	France	Aymeric de Ponnat	Ricore Courcelle	0	0					
1	France			0	4	4			€ 24,000	
2	Great Britain	Keith Shore	Mystic Hurricane	8	8					
2	Great Britain	Robert Bevis	Courtney Z	0	0					
2	Great Britain	Joe Clayton	Velini	0	0					
2	Great Britain	Laura Renwick	Heliodor Hybris	16	0					
2	Great Britain			8	0	8			€ 14,000	
2	Ireland	Cameron Hanley	Z Acodate DDL	0	0					
2	Ireland	Anthony Condon	Aristio	4	4					
2	Ireland	Capt. Michael Kelly	Ringwood Glen	4	0					
2	Ireland	Dermott Lennon	Loughview Lou-Lou	8	0					
2	Ireland			8	0	8			€ 14,000	
4	Belgium	Fabienne Daigneux Lange	Venue d'Fees des Hazalles	4	0					
4	Belgium	Catherine van Roosbroeck	Calumet	0	8					
4	Belgium	Wilm Vermeir	Garrincha Hedoniste	0	12					
4	Belgium	Jérôme Guery	Papillon Z	0	4					
4	Belgium			0	12	12			€ 6,000	
4	Netherlands	Vincent Voorn	Quinlan	4	0					
4	Netherlands	Johnny Pals	Vignet	8	4					
4	Netherlands	Leon Thijssen	Haertthago	0	4					
4	Netherlands	Henk van de Pol	Willink	4	0					
4	Netherlands			8	4	12			€ 6,000	
4	Switzerland	Nadja Peter Steiner	Capuera II	0	4					
4	Switzerland	Claudia Gisler	Cordel	0	4					
4	Switzerland	Frédérique Fabre Belbos	Nirvana Basters	0	4					
4	Switzerland	Edwin Smits	Copain du Perchet CH	12	0					
4	Switzerland			4	8	12			€ 6,000	
7	Ukraine	Cássio Rivetti	Fine Fleur du Marais	0	4					
7	Ukraine	Katharina Offel	Charlie	8	8					
7	Ukraine	Ferenc Szentirmai	Chadino	8	4					
7	Ukraine	René Tebbel	Forlap	0	0					
7	Ukraine			8	8	16			€ 3,000	50
8	Spain	Manuel Fernández Saro	Santiago de Blondel	4	0					
8	Spain	Gerardo Menéndez	Cassino DC	4	4					
8	Spain	Alberto Márquez	Belcanto Z	13	16					
8	Spain	Sergio Álvarez Moya	G And C Quitador Rochelais	0	8					
8	Spain			8	12	20			€ 3,000	
9	Canada	Tiffany Foster	Tripple X III	4						
9	Canada	Kara Chad	Zamiro 16	8						
9	Canada	Elizabeth Gingras	Zilversprings	8						
9	Canada	Eric Lamaze	Fine Lady 5	0						
9	Canada			12						
10	United States	Candice King	Kismet	R						
10	United States	Audrey Coulter	Capital Colnardo	4						
10	United States	Ali Wolff	Casall	4						
10	United States	Jack Towell	Emilie de Diamant AS	12						
10	United States			12						

== Gijón Grand Prix ==
The Gijón Grand Prix, the Show jumping Grand Prix of the 2015 CSIO Gijón, was the major show jumping competition at this event. The sponsor of this competition was Banco Sabadell Herrero. It was held on Monday 4 August 2014. The competition was a show jumping competition over two rounds, the height of the fences were up to 1.60 meters.

It was endowed with 153,000 €.

	Rider	Horse	Round 1	Round 2		Total penalties	prize money
	Rider	Horse	Penalties	Penalties	Time (s)	Total penalties	prize money
1	(Netherlands) Henk van de Pol	Willink	0	0	49.32	0	50,490 €
2	(Republic of Ireland) Cameron Hanley	Antello Z	0	0	49.82	0	30,600 €
3	(Spain) Sergio Álvarez Moya	G and C Quitador Rochelais	0	0	50.34	0	22,950 €
4	(Belgium) Catherine van Roosbroeck	Gautcho da Quinta	0	0	51.49	0	15,300 €
5	(Spain) Manuel Fernández Saro	Duke of Carneval	0	0	54.36	0	9,180 €
6	(Republic of Ireland) Billy Twomey	Tinka's Serenade	0	4	48.09	4	6,885 €
7	(United States) Jack Towell	Lucifer V	0	4	48.64	4	4,590 €
8	(United Kingdom) Laura Renwick	Bintang II	0	4	49.67	4	3,825 €
9	(Ukraine) Katharina Offel	Charlie	0	4	50.14	4	3,060 €
10	(Netherlands) Leon Thijssen	Haertthago	0	4	51.80	4	3,060 €

(Top 10 of 45 Competitors)

== Winners by day ==
Day	Att.	Total prize (€)	Height	Winner	Horse	Results
Wednesday 26	7,643	7,680	1.40	(Saudi Arabia) Abdullah Al-Sharbatly	Quintus 81	
Wednesday 26	7,643	24,725	1.50	(Canada) Eric Lamaze	Fine Lady 5	
Thursday 27	9,842	7,620	1.40	(Spain) Diego Pérez Bilbao	Lordanos Junior	
Thursday 27	9,842	62,020	1.60	(Republic of Ireland) Billy Twomey	Tinka's Serenade	
Friday 28	7,038	24,650	1.50	(Saudi Arabia) Abdullah Al-Sharbatly	Callahan	
Friday 28	7,038	24,500	1.45	(Saudi Arabia) Abdullah Al-Sharbatly	Quintus 81	
Saturday 29	6,087	76,000	1.60	France		
Saturday 29	6,087	24,500	1.45	(United Kingdom) Laura Renwick	Rembrandt Blue	
Sunday 30	9,134	9,000	1.40	(United Kingdom) Keith Shore	Zegreanne Z	
Sunday 30	9,134	33,180	1.50	(Saudi Arabia) Abdullah Al-Sharbatly	Callahan	
Monday 31	4,746	9,000	1.40	(Saudi Arabia) Abdulrahman Alrajhi	Chicago 84	
Monday 31	4,746	153,000	1.60	(Netherlands) Henk van de Pol	Willink	
