= 2003 CSIO Gijón =

Entertainment event

The 2003 CSIO Gijón was the 2003 edition of the Spanish official show jumping horse show, at Las Mestas Sports Complex in Gijón. It was held as CSIO 5*.

This edition of the CSIO Gijón was held between August and September.

== Nations Cup ==
The competition was a show jumping competition with two rounds. The height of the fences were up to 1.60 meters. The best six teams of the eleven which participated were allowed to start in the second round.

Ran on 30 August 2003, Ireland won its first Nations Cup at Gijón ever.

	Team	Rider	Horse	Round A	Round B	Total penalties	Jump-off		Prize money €
	Team	Rider	Horse	Penalties	Penalties	Total penalties	Penalties	Time (s)	Prize money €
1	Ireland	Lt. Shane Carey	Killossery	0	4				
1	Ireland	Harry Marshall	Splendido	0	4				
1	Ireland	Capt. Gerry Flynn	Bornacoola	8	8				
1	Ireland	Clement McMahon	Gelvin Clover	4	0				
1	Ireland			8	8	16			
2	Great Britain	Damien Charles	Romolus 16	4	0				
2	Great Britain	David McPherson	Maddock	8	0				
2	Great Britain	Alex Rident	Dody de Chalusse	8	9				
2	Great Britain	Tim Stockdale	Fresh Direct Jerome	0	8				
2	Great Britain			12	8	20			
3	Belgium	Kristof Cleeren	Loverboy	0	4				
3	Belgium	Grégory Whatelet	Jarum du Val Tibermont	12	4				
3	Belgium	Patric McEntee	Johan du Mury-Marais	4	27				
3	Belgium	Gilbert de Roock	Liberty	8	4				
3	Belgium			12	12	24			
4	Switzerland	Beat Grandjean	Kuno	12	0				
4	Switzerland	Hansueli Sprunger	Rubens du Ry d'Asse	1	E				
4	Switzerland	Christophe Barbeau	Querly Chin	16	8				
4	Switzerland	Markus Fuchs	La Toya	8	0				
4	Switzerland			21	8	29			
5	United States	Sarah Baldwin	Kijoy For Ever	9	0				
5	United States	Eva Gonda	El Campeon's So Long 29	35	NP				
5	United States	John French	Milenium	4	13				
5	United States	Marley Goodman	Apprapaos	8	0				
5	United States			21	13	34			
6	Italy	Carlo Rogiani	Kobus	8	8				
6	Italy	Juan Carlos Garcia	Albin III	E	NP				
6	Italy	Roberto Cristofoletti	Lohengin di Villa Emilia	4	4				
6	Italy	Luca Carini	D'Artagnan	8	4				
6	Italy			20	16	36			
7	Spain	Luis Jesús Escobar	Saladino	8	12				
7	Spain	Luis Álvarez Cervera	Nordico	16	4				
7	Spain	Jesús Garmendia	Espoir de la Haye	9	13				
7	Spain	Manuel Fernández Saro	Nike	9	2				
7	Spain			26	18	44			
8	Germany	Florian Meyer zu Hartam	Waldrose 10	8					
8	Germany	Janne-Friederike Meyer	Callistro	12					
8	Germany	Thomas Schepers	Capital W	12					
8	Germany	Heinrich Hermann Engemann	Aboyeur W	4					
8	Germany			24					
9	France	Philippe Leoni	Liro	8					
9	France	Dominique Mascella Robert	Auleto	4					
9	France	Jacques Bonnet	Jacques Bonnet	16					
9	France	Michel Robert	Olympia	16					
9	France			28					
10	Portugal	João Mota	Erotic de l'Ayoux	E					
10	Portugal	Bernardo Mathias	Pablo vh Vliethof	8					
10	Portugal	Francisco Caldeira	Quro	12					
10	Portugal	Alexandre Mascarenhas	Ishcah	E					

Grey penalties points do not count for the team result.

== Gijón Grand Prix ==
The Gijón Grand Prix, the Show jumping Grand Prix of the 2004 CSIO Gijón, was the major show jumping competition at this event. It was held on 2 August 2004. The competition was a show jumping competition over one round with tie-break for the riders that made 0 points in the main round, the height of the fences were up to 1.60 meters.

Irish Harry Marshall won the competition with Splendido.
