= 2008 CSI Gijón =

Show jumping event in Gijón, Spain

The 2008 CSI Gijón was the 2008 edition of the Gijón show jumping horse show, at Las Mestas Sports Complex in Gijón. This edition of the CSIO Gijón was held between 23 and 28 July 2008.

This was the first time since 1991, that the contest was not held as official, as this year was in Madrid, with the aim to promote the Madrid bid for the 2016 Summer Olympics.

== Gijón Grand Prix ==
The Gijón Grand Prix, the Show jumping Grand Prix of the 2008 CSIO Gijón, was the major show jumping competition at this event. It was held on 28 July 2008. The competition was a show jumping competition over two rounds, the height of the fences were up to 1.60 meters.

It was endowed with €150,000 .

	Rider	Horse	Round 1	Round 2		Total penalties	prize money
	Rider	Horse	Penalties	Penalties	Time (s)	Total penalties	prize money
1	(United Kingdom) John Whitaker	Utah van Erpekom	0	0	62.55	0	€37,500
2	(France) Michel Hécart	Tini Candy	0	0	68.55	0	€30,000
3	(Spain) Rutherford Latham	Guarana Champeix	1	2	76.79	3	€22,500
4	(Austria) Thomas Frühmann	The Sixth Sence	0	4	61.46	1	€15,000
5	(France) Michel Robert	Kellemoi de Pepita	4	0	66.00	4	€12,000
6	(France) Thimotée Anciaume	Lamm de Fetan	4	0	66.68	4	€10,500
7	(Spain) Pilar Lucrecia Cordón	Herald 3	0	5	72.55	4	€7,500
8	(France) Patrice Delaveau	Katchina Mail	4	4	61.46	8	€6,000
9	(France) Pénélope Leprevost	Jubilée d'Ouilly	4	4	64.56	8	€4,500
10	(Belgium) François Mathy	Ivoire du rouet	4	8	69.36	12	€4,500

(Top 10 of 41 Competitors)
