= 2019 CSIO Gijón =

The 2019 CSIO Gijón was the 2019 edition of the Spanish official show jumping horse show, at Las Mestas Sports Complex in Gijón. It was held as CSIO 5*.

This edition of the CSIO Gijón was held between 28 August and 1 September.

== Nations Cup ==
The Cup was a show jumping competition with two rounds, held on 30 August. The height of the fences were up to 1.60 meters. The best eight teams of the twelve which participated were allowed to start in the second round. The competition was endowed with €73,500.

Italy won their first Nations Cup at Gijón ever, after a perfect second round.

	Team	Rider	Horse	Round 1	Round 2	Total penalties	Jump-off		Prize money	scoring points
	Team	Rider	Horse	Penalties	Penalties	Total penalties	Penalties	Time (s)	Prize money	scoring points
1	Italy	Filippo Marco Bologni	Sedik Milano Quilazio	12	1					
1	Italy	Antonio Maria Garofalo	Conquestador	1	8					
1	Italy	Emmanuele Camilli	Jakko	0	0					
1	Italy	Antonio Alfonso	Donanso	4	0					
1	Italy			5	1	6			€26,000	
2	Great Britain	Joseph Clayton	Carreau of Greenhill Z	0	4					
2	Great Britain	Helen Tredwell	Galtur	9	8					
2	Great Britain	Max Routledge	Balulu	4	0					
2	Great Britain	Ellen Whitaker	Arena UK Winston	0	0					
2	Great Britain			4	4	8			€18,000	
3	France	Max Thirouin	Utopie Villelongue	5	4					
3	France	Felicie Bertrand	Sultane des Ibis	0	0					
3	France	Laurent Goffinet	Atome des Etisses	8	4					
3	France	Mathieu Billot	Quel Filou 13	0	0					
3	France			5	4	9			€12,000	
4	Germany	Markus Brinkmann	Pikeur Dylon	4	0					
4	Germany	Jens Baackman	Carmen 255	4	8					
4	Germany	Nisse Lüneburg	Luca Toni 27	0	12					
4	Germany	Holger Hetzel	Legioner	4	0					
4	Germany			8	8	16			€6,500	
4	Ireland	David Simpson	Gentlemen vh Veldhof	1	1					
4	Ireland	Alexander Butler	Chilli B	5	NP					
4	Ireland	Billy Twomey	Chat Botte E.D.	5	1					
4	Ireland	Greg Broderick	Westbrook	4	4					
4	Ireland			10	6	16			€6,500	
6	New Zealand	Bruce Goodin	Backatorps Danny V	0	4					
6	New Zealand	Tom Tarver-Priebe	Popeye	5	21					
6	New Zealand	Samantha McIntosh	Check In 2	0	4					
6	New Zealand	Richar Gardner	Calisto 5	16	4					
6	New Zealand			5	12	27			€5,000	
7	Spain	Alberto Márquez Galobardes	Ucello Massuere	0	4					
7	Spain	Jesús Torres García	Orphee du Breche	4	4					
7	Spain	Laura Roquet	Sandi Puigroq	6	12					
7	Spain	Eduardo Álvarez Aznar	Seringat	12	4					
7	Spain			10	12	22			€3,000	
8	Netherlands	Lisa Nooren	VDL Groep Sabech d'HA	20	4					
8	Netherlands	Hendrik-Jan Schuttert	Expensive	1	13					
8	Netherlands	Jack Ansems	Fliere Fluiter	12	8					
8	Netherlands	Michael Greeve	Turbo Z	0	NP					
8	Netherlands			13	25	38			€3,000	
9	Sweden	Marcus Westergren	Calmere	4						
9	Sweden	Hannah Åkerblom	Chodec	9						
9	Sweden	Antonia Pettersson Häggström	Chickflick K	4						
9	Sweden	Annika Axelsson	W Diva Rosa MFS	5						
9	Sweden			13						
10	Mexico	Manuel González Dufrane	Hortensia van de Leeuwerk	4						
10	Mexico	Francisco Pasquel	Coronado	12						
10	Mexico	Fernando Martínez Sommer	Cor Bakker	9						
10	Mexico	Federico Fernández	Davidoff	5						
10	Mexico			18						
11	Egypt	Karim El Zoghby	Crocket W	10						
11	Egypt	Alaa Mayssara	Dittorio S	4						
11	Egypt	Wael Mahgary	Evergreen	11						
11	Egypt	Sameh El Dahan	Chanel XXV	16						
11	Egypt			25						
12	Portugal	Rodrigo Giesteira Almeida	GB Celine	5						
12	Portugal	António Matos Almeida	Apache de Liam	21						
12	Portugal	Luis Sabino Gonçalves	Unesco du Rouet	16						
12	Portugal	Luciana Diniz	Vertigo du Dessert	NP						
12	Portugal			42						

== Gijón Grand Prix ==
The Gijón Grand Prix, the Show jumping Grand Prix of the 2019 CSIO Gijón, was the major show jumping competition at this event. The sponsor of this competition was Funeraria Gijonesa. It was held on Sunday, 2 September 2019. The competition was a show jumping competition over two rounds, the height of the fences were up to 1.60 meters.

It was endowed with 147,000 €. Greg Broderick won the trophy.

	Rider	Horse	Round 1	Round 2		Total penalties	prize money
	Rider	Horse	Penalties	Penalties	Time (s)	Total penalties	prize money
1	(Republic of Ireland) Greg Broderick	Westbrook	0	0	49.52	0	48,510 €
2	(France) Mathieu Billot	Quel Filou 13	0	0	49.81	0	29,400 €
3	(France) Felicie Bertrand	Sultane des Ibis	0	0	50.67	0	22,050 €
4	(Mexico) Fernando Martínez Sommer	Cor Bakker	0	0	52.42	0	14,700 €
5	(Egypt) Alaa Mayssara	Dittorio S	0	0	58.89	0	8,820 €
6	(Netherlands) Henk van de Pol	Looyman Z	0	4	53.94	4	6,615 €
7	(France) Pierre Marie Friant	Urdy d'Astree	4	4	52.95	8	4,410 €
8	(Germany) Maximilam Lill	Cita Z	4	4	56.23	8	3,675 €
9	(Republic of Ireland) Alexander Butler	Divine Hero	4	4	56.66	8	2,940 €
10	(Spain) Carolina Aresu	Untrepide de Buychety	4	4	57.41	8	2,940 €

(Top 10 of 49 Competitors)

== Winners by day ==
Day	Att.	Total prize (€)	Height	Winner	Horse	Results
Wednesday 28	8,056	5,000	1.40	(Republic of Ireland) Alexander Butler	Dekato	
Wednesday 28	8,056	25,000	1.50	(United Kingdom) Ellen Whitaker	Jack van't Kattenheye	
Thursday 29	8,867	5,000	1.40	(Republic of Ireland) Alexander Butler	Dekato	
Thursday 29	8,867	50,200	1.50	(Portugal) Luciana Diniz	Vertigo du Dessert	
Friday 30	8,921	73,500	1.60	Italy		
Friday 30	8,921	7,500	1.40	(Spain) Julio Arias	Tip Top de l'Orle	
Saturday 31	9,084	5,040	1.40	(Sweden) Marcus Westergren	Faya Sao Miguel	
Saturday 31	9,084	93,300	1.60	(Spain) Eduardo Álvarez Aznar	Seringat	
Sunday 1	6,784	5,000	1.40	(Republic of Ireland) Alexander Butler	Dekato	
Sunday 1	6,784	147,000	1.60	(Republic of Ireland) Greg Broderick	Westbrook	
