= 2005 CSIO Gijón =

Show jumping event in Gijón, Spain

The 2005 CSIO Gijón was the 2005 edition of the Spanish official show jumping horse show, at Las Mestas Sports Complex in Gijón. It was held as CSIO 5*.

This edition of the CSIO Gijón was held between 27 August to 4 September.

== Nations Cup ==
The competition was a show jumping competition with two rounds. The height of the fences were up to 1.60 meters. The best six teams of the eleven which participated were allowed to start in the second round.

The competition was endowed with €60,000.

	Team	Rider	Horse	Round A	Round B	Total penalties	Jump-off		Prize money €
	Team	Rider	Horse	Penalties	Penalties	Total penalties	Penalties	Time (s)	Prize money €
1	Belgium	Kristof Cleeren	Andiamo Z	4	0				
1	Belgium	Yves Simon	Mazarin des Perees	8	4				
1	Belgium	Niels Bruynseels	Item de Quintin	0	4				
1	Belgium	François Mathy Jr.	Ivoire du Rouet	4	20				
1	Belgium			8	8	16			€ 19,000
2	Spain	Rutherford Latham	Galoubette Mondain	8	4				
2	Spain	Sergio Álvarez Moya	Le Reve du Nabab	4	8				
2	Spain	Álvaro Muñoz Escassi	Majestic So La La La	12	4				
2	Spain	Ricardo Jurado	Procasa Le Monde	0	0				
2	Spain			12	8	20			€ 13,000
3	Netherlands	Piet Raymakers	Van Schijndel's Now or Never	8	4				
3	Netherlands	Piet Raymakers Jr.	Van Schijndel's Rascin	0	12				
3	Netherlands	Emile Tacken	Miss Montana	4	0				
3	Netherlands	Wout-Jan van der Schans	Nouvelle	4	12				
3	Netherlands			8	16	24			€ 9,250
3	Ireland	Trevor Coyle	Over Time GMS	0	0				
3	Ireland	Ryan Crumley	Baltimore	8	4				
3	Ireland	Cameron Hanley	Hippica Kerman	12	9				
3	Ireland	Conor Swail	Poncho	4	8				
3	Ireland			12	12	24			€ 9,250
5	Great Britain	Scott Smith	Cabri d'Elle	12	8				
5	Great Britain	Alex Rident	Hermes de Bruyères	4	8				
5	Great Britain	Duncan Inglis	Sunkist	8	4				
5	Great Britain	Tim Stockdale	Fresh Direct Corlato	4	4				
5	Great Britain			16	16	32			€ 5,500
6	Italy	Jonella Ligresti	Nanta	4	8				
6	Italy	Piergiorgio Bucci	Hamilton de Perhet	4	12				
6	Italy	Marco Porro	Rebecca X	8	16				
6	Italy	Bruno Chimirri	Landknecht	8	0				
6	Italy			16	20	36			€ 4,000
7	Sweden	Svante Johansson	Nostradamus 972	9					
7	Sweden	Malin Baryard-Johnsson	Butterfly Flip	8					
7	Sweden	Peder Fredricson	H&M Magic Bengtsson	4					
7	Sweden	Maria Gretzer	Spender S	8					
7	Sweden			20					
7	Germany	Andreas Knippling	Papparazzi	12					
7	Germany	Lutz Gripshöver	Polyfee 2	4					
7	Germany	Caroline Müller	Kyraleen	4					
7	Germany	Holger Wulschner	Clausen	12					
7	Germany			20					
7	Switzerland	Daniel Etter	Hermine d'Auzay	8					
7	Switzerland	Gregoire Oberson	Joker de la Maladrie	8					
7	Switzerland	Pierre Kolly	Galopin du Biolay	4					
7	Switzerland	Steve Guerdat	Issis du Marais	E					
7	Switzerland			20					
10	France	Pierre Jarry	Haxelle Dampierre	16					
10	France	Julien Epaillard	Icare du Manet	8					
10	France	Marie Pellegrin	Ice d'Ancoeur	E					
10	France	Robert Breul	Flushin	8					
10	France			32					
7	Portugal	António Portela	Echo de Lessay	8					
7	Portugal	Rui Gonçalo	Fakir du Croisy	12					
7	Portugal	Miguel Faria Leal	Lacrima da Meia Lua	20					
7	Portugal	João Mota	Hugo des Bruyères II	12					
7	Portugal			32					

Grey penalties points do not count for the team result.

== Gijón Grand Prix ==
The Gijón Grand Prix, the Show jumping Grand Prix of the 2005 CSIO Gijón, was the major show jumping competition at this event. It was held on 7 August 2005. The competition was a show jumping competition over two rounds, the height of the fences were up to 1.60 meters.

It was endowed with €107,925 .

	Rider	Horse	Round 1	Round 2		Total penalties	prize money
	Rider	Horse	Penalties	Penalties	Time (s)	Total penalties	prize money
1	(Switzerland) Pierre Kolly	Galopin du Biolay	0	0	47.90	0	€35,000
2	(Belgium) Kristof Cleeren	Andamio Z	0	0	48.08	0	€24,200
3	(Republic of Ireland) Conor Swail	Poncho	0	0	48.92	0	€15,475
4	(France) Pierre Jarry	Haxelle Dampierre	0	0	49.00	0	€10,310
5	(Germany) Andreas Knippling	Papparazzi	0	0	49.35	0	€5,980
6	(Republic of Ireland) Harry Marshall	Ado Annie	0	0	49.57	0	€4,230
7	(Norway) Toni Andre Hansen	ET Royal Volo	0	0	49.89	0	€2,990
8	(Spain) Sergio Álvarez Moya	Le Reve de Nabab	0	0	50.05	0	€2,615
9	(Sweden) Svante Johansson	Nostradamus 972	0	0	50.06	8	€2,250
10	(Mexico) Sergio Nieto	Equibox Caetano	0	0	50.72	0	€1,950

(Top 10 of 50 Competitors)
