= 2011 CSIO Gijón =

Show jumping event in Gijón, Spain

The 2011 CSIO Gijón was the 2011 edition of the Spanish official show jumping horse show, at Las Mestas Sports Complex in Gijón. It was held as CSIO 5*.

This edition of the CSIO Gijón was held between August 31 and September 5.

== Nations Cup ==
The 2011 FEI Nations Cup of Spain was the fifth competition of the 2011 FEI Nations Cup Promotional League and was held on Saturday, September 1, 2014.

The competition was a show jumping competition with two rounds. The height of the fences were up to 1.60 meters. The best six teams of the eleven which participated were allowed to start in the second round. As participant in the Promotional League, Denmark was also allowed to participate in the second round.

The competition was endowed with €63,600.

	Team	Rider	Horse	Round A	Round B	Total penalties	Jump-off		Prize money €	scoring points
	Team	Rider	Horse	Penalties	Penalties	Total penalties	Penalties	Time (s)	Prize money €	scoring points
1	Spain	Pilar Lucrecia Cordón Muro	Nuage Bleu	0	0					
1	Spain	Eduardo Álvarez Aznar	Rico Revel	12	8					
1	Spain	Jesús Garmendia	Lord du Mont Milon	4	13					
1	Spain	Julio Arias	Murat de Reve	0	0					
1	Spain			4	8	12			€20,000	11
2	Great Britain	Scott Brash	Bon Ami II	12	4					
2	Great Britain	David McPherson	Billy Bishop	0	0					
2	Great Britain	Bruce Menzies	Sultan	0	0					
2	Great Britain	Robert Whitaker	Omelli	10	8					
2	Great Britain			11	4	15			€14,000	-
3	Sweden	Malin Baryard-Johnsson	Tornesch	0	8					
3	Sweden	Helena Persson	Bonzai H	0	8					
3	Sweden	Peder Fredricson	Arctic Aurora Borealis	0	4					
3	Sweden	Svante Johansson	Caramell KS	4	4					
3	Sweden			0	16	16			€10,000	8
4	Norway	Stein Endresen	Hoo de Monterey	4	0					
4	Norway	Nina Braaten	Loyd	4	4					
4	Norway	Nicholai Lindbjerg	Coquette	21	8					
4	Norway	Geir Gulliksen	L'Espoir	4	7					
4	Norway			12	11	23			€8,000	7
5	France	Eugenie Angot	Old Chap Tame	did not start	did not start					
5	France	Pénélope Leprevost	Topinambour	4	0					
5	France	Clement Boulanger	Winsome van de Plataan	8	8					
5	France	Patrice Delaveau	Orient Express	0	4					
5	France			12	12	24			€6,000	-
6	Ireland	Edward Doyle	Samgemjee	4	8					
6	Ireland	Marion Hughes	Fortuna	9	8					
6	Ireland	Dermott Lennon	Lou Lou	4	4					
6	Ireland	Capt. David O'Brien	Annestown	4	4					
6	Ireland			12	16	28			€5,600	-
7	Switzerland	Theo Muff	Acomet	4						
7	Switzerland	Claudia Gisler	Touchable	4						
7	Switzerland	Andreas Ott	Loxy de la Reselle CH	8						
7	Switzerland	Niklaus Schurtenberger	Cantus	R						
7	Switzerland			16		16				-
8	Italy	Emanuele Gaudiano	Chicago 84	12						
8	Italy	Fabrio Brotto	New Zealand delle Roane	8						
8	Italy	Luka Marziani	Wivina	4						
8	Italy	Natale Chiaudani	Almero 12	5						
8	Italy			17		17				-
9	Belgium	Grégory Wathelet	Cybertop	E						
9	Belgium	Pieter Devos	Candy	4						
9	Belgium	Koen Vereecke	Woodrow Carisbrooke	4						
9	Belgium	Philippe Le Jeune	Loro Piana Boyante de Muze	12						
9	Belgium			20		20				-
9	Canada	Jill Henselwood	George	9						
9	Canada	Jenna Thompson	Zeke	12						
9	Canada	Chris Pratt	Cruise	12						
9	Canada	Eric Lamaze	Atlete van T Heike	4						
9	Canada			25		25				-

Grey penalties points do not count for the team result.

== Gijón Grand Prix ==
The Gijón Grand Prix, the Show jumping Grand Prix of the 2011 CSIO Gijón, was the major show jumping competition at this event. It was held on Monday 5 September 2011. The competition was a show jumping competition over two rounds, the height of the fences were up to 1.60 meters.

It was endowed with €125,000 .

	Rider	Horse	Round 1	Round 2		Total penalties	prize money
	Rider	Horse	Penalties	Penalties	Time (s)	Total penalties	prize money
1	(France) Patrice Delaveau	Orient Express HDC	0	0	68.43	0	€41,500
2	(Germany) Bruce Menzies	Sultan	0	1	71.02	1	€28,500
3	(Sweden) Malin Baryard-Johnsson	Reveur de Hurtebise HDC	4	0	68.89	4	€18,000
4	(Netherlands) Vincent Voorn	Gestion Priamus Z	0	4	70.52	4	€12,000
5	(Switzerland) Claudia Gisler	Touchable	0	5	71.71	5	€8,000
6	(Canada) Jill Henselwood	George	4	1	72.30	5	€5,000
7	(Switzerland) Niklaus Schurtenberger	Cantus	4	1	74.91	5	€4,000
8	(Republic of Ireland) Cian O'Connor	Splendor	4	4	64.66	8	€3,000
9	(Belgium) Koen Vereecke	Allegro van de Donkhoeve	4	4	69.79	8	€2,500
10	(Switzerland) Andreas Ott	Loxy de la Reselle CH	4	9	73.89	13	€2,500

(Top 10 of 40 Competitors)
