= 2014 CSIO Gijón =

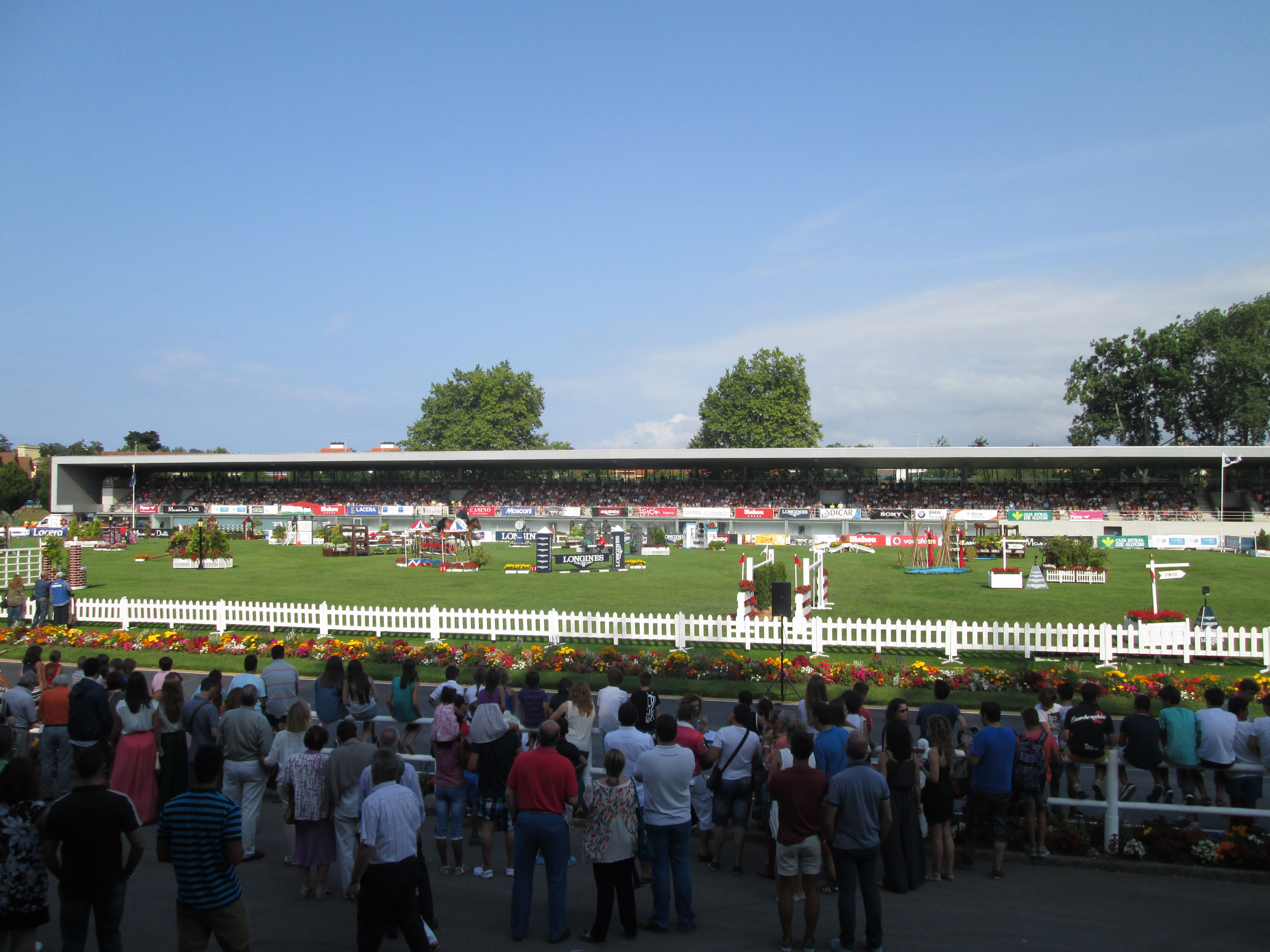
The 2014 CSIO Gijón, during the Prince of Asturias Grand Prix

The 2014 CSIO Gijón was the 2014 edition of the Spanish official show jumping horse show, at Las Mestas Sports Complex in Gijón. It was held as CSIO 5*.

This edition of the CSIO Gijón was held between July 30 and August 4.

== Nations Cup ==
The 2014 FEI Nations Cup of Spain was the sixth competition of the European Division 2 in the 2014 Furusiyya FEI Nations Cup and was held on Saturday, August 1, 2014.

The competition was a show jumping competition with two rounds. The height of the fences were up to 1.60 meters. The best eight teams of the eleven which participated were allowed to start in the second round. The competition was endowed with €67,000. It was the first time the United States win the Nations Cup in Gijón.

	Team	Rider	Horse	Round A	Round B	Total penalties	Jump-off		Prize money	scoring points
	Team	Rider	Horse	Penalties	Penalties	Total penalties	Penalties	Time (s)	Prize money	scoring points
1	United States	Ashlee Bond	Chela LS	4	0					
1	United States	Catherine Pasmore	Bonanza van Paemel	0	4					
1	United States	Quentin Judge	HH Copin van de Broy	4	4					
1	United States	Georgina Bloomberg	Juvina	0	0					
1	United States			4	4	8			20,500 €	
2	Switzerland	Nadja Peter-Steiner	Capuera	5	8					
2	Switzerland	Claudia Gisler	Cordel	4	0					
2	Switzerland	Niklaus Rutschi	Windsor XV	0	4					
2	Switzerland	Marie Etter-Pellegrin	Admirable	8	0					
2	Switzerland			9	4	13			14,500 €	
3	(United Kingdom) Great Britain	Holly Gillot	Dougie Douglas	1	1					
3	(United Kingdom) Great Britain	Yasmin Pinchen	Ashkari	8	1					
3	(United Kingdom) Great Britain	Robert Bevis	Pebbles IV	9	0					
3	(United Kingdom) Great Britain	Laura Renwick	Bintang II	4	retired					
3	(United Kingdom) Great Britain			13	2	15			10,500 €	
4	Spain	Pilar Lucrecia Cordón	Nuage Bleu	0	8					
4	Spain	Manuel Añón	Rackel Chevannaise	8	0					
4	Spain	Eduardo Álvarez Aznar	Fidux	13	0					
4	Spain	Sergio Álvarez Moya	Action Breaker	0	4					
4	Spain			8	8	16			7,400 €	
5	Italy	Juan Carlos Garcia	Bonzai van der Warande	0	0					
5	Italy	Massimiliano Ferrario	Loro Piana Acamar	9	5					
5	Italy	Giulia Martinengo	Fixdesign Funke van'T Heike	0	eliminated					
5	Italy	Daniele Augusto da Rios	For Passion	9	4					
5	Italy			9	9	18			5,400 €	100
6	Belgium	Dirk Demeersman	Stb Fleuri van de Koekelberg	4	5					
6	Belgium	Donaat Brondeel	Breemeersen Adorado	8	5					
6	Belgium	Patrick Spits	Whitney van de Dwerse Hagen	16	16					
6	Belgium	Philippe Le Jeune	Loro Piana Once de Kreisker	5	0					
6	Belgium			17	10	27			5,400 €	
7	Norway	Ole Kristoffer Meland	CC Top	9	12					
7	Norway	Morten Djupvik	Valley Stream B	4	eliminated					
7	Norway	Dag Ove Kingsrød	Dimaro vd Looise Heide	9	0					
7	Norway	Geir Gulliksen	Edesa S Banjan	9	0					
7	Norway			22	12	34			3,400 €	90
8	France	Pénélope Leprevost	Flora de Mariposa	0						
8	France	Roger Yves Bost	Castle Forbes Myrtille Paulois	18						
8	France	Aymeric de Ponnat	Armitages Boy	16						
8	France	Simon Delestre	Qlassic Bois Margot	4						
8	France			20	DNS					
9	Germany	David Will	Mic Mac du Tillard	8						
9	Germany	Sebastian Karshüning	Taquila 2	eliminated						
9	Germany	Joachim Heyer	Aquarell PW	11						
9	Germany	Felix Hassmann	Horse Gym's Balzaci	4						
9	Germany			23						
10	Qatar	Khalid Mohammed Al Emadi	Tamira IV	10						
10	Qatar	Hamad Mohammed Al Attiyah	Whitaker	5						
10	Qatar	Salman Mohammed Al Emadi	Vivaldi K	eliminated						
10	Qatar	Nasser Al Ghazali	Delloren	8						
10	Qatar			23						
11	Argentina	José María Larocca	GDE Matrix	0						
11	Argentina	Martín Federico Moschini	Winbishi Caloudina	retired						
11	Argentina	Luis Pedro Birabén	Whin Whin	10						
11	Argentina	Martín Dopazo	Conrad d'Esquelmes Z	14						
11	Argentina			24						

== Gijón Grand Prix ==
The Gijón Grand Prix, the Show jumping Grand Prix of the 2014 CSIO Gijón, was the major show jumping competition at this event. The sponsor of this competition was Banco Sabadell Herrero. It was held on Monday 4 August 2014. The competition was a show jumping competition over two rounds, the height of the fences were up to 1.60 meters.

It was endowed with 151,000 €.

	Rider	Horse	Round 1	Round 2		Total penalties	prize money
	Rider	Horse	Penalties	Penalties	Time (s)	Total penalties	prize money
1	(Switzerland) Niklaus Rutschi	Windsor XV	0	0	53.23	0	49,830 €
2	(United States) Ashlee Bond	Chela L S	0	0	53.79	0	30,200 €
3	(France) Kevin Staut	Estoy Aquí de Muze HDC	0	0	55.04	0	22,650 €
4	(Switzerland) Marie Etter-Pellegrin	Admirable	0	0	56.86	0	15,100 €
5	(Brazil) Pedro Veniss	Quabri de L Isle	0	0	60.29	0	9,060 €
6	(France) Simon Delestre	Qlassic Bois Margot	0	4	58.90	4	6,795 €
7	(United Kingdom) Yasmin Pinchen	Ashkari	0	4	61.31	4	4,530 €
8	(United Kingdom) Robert Bevis	Pebbles IV	0	4	62.77	4	3,775 €
9	(United States) Quentin Judge	HH Copin van de Broy	0	8	53.98	8	3,020 €
10	(France) Patrice Delaveau	Orient Express HDC	0	8	56.42	8	3,020 €

(Top 10 of 44 Competitors)
