= 2017 CSIO Gijón =

The 2017 CSIO Gijón was the 2017 edition of the Spanish official show jumping horse show, at Las Mestas Sports Complex in Gijón. It was held as CSIO 5*.

This edition of the CSIO Gijón was held between August 30 and September 4.

== Nations Cup ==
The 2017 FEI Nations Cup of Spain was part of the European Division 2 in the 2017 FEI Nations Cup and was held on Saturday, 2 September 2017. Great Britain was the only team that could win points for the ranking.

The Cup was a show jumping competition with two rounds. The height of the fences were up to 1.60 meters. The best eight teams of the eleven which participated were allowed to start in the second round. The competition was endowed with €80,000. France won its 11th Nations Cup in Gijón.

	Team	Rider	Horse	Round 1	Round 2	Total penalties	Jump-off		Prize money	scoring points
	Team	Rider	Horse	Penalties	Penalties	Total penalties	Penalties	Time (s)	Prize money	scoring points
1	France	Kevin Staut	For Joy van't Zorgvliet HDC	0	4					
1	France	Edward Levy	Sirius Black	4	0					
1	France	Grégory Cottard	Regate d'Aure	0	4					
1	France	Nicolas Delmotte	Ilex VP	0	0					
1	France			0	4	4			€ 26,000	
2	Netherlands	Johnny Pals	Wesselina	8	0					
2	Netherlands	Roelof Bril	Arlando	0	0					
2	Netherlands	Sanne Thijssen	Celine M Z	4	12					
2	Netherlands	Frank Schuttert	Chianti's Champion	4	0					
2	Netherlands			8	0	8			€ 18,000	
3	Ireland	Shane Breen	Ipswich van de Wolfsakker	0	0					
3	Ireland	David Simpson	Keoki	8	12					
3	Ireland	Cameron Hanley	Quirex	4	0					
3	Ireland	Anthony Condon	Balzac	12	0					
3	Ireland			12	0	12			€ 12,000	
4	Canada	Chris Pratt	Concorde	0	4					
4	Canada	Jaclyn Duff	Eh All or None	1	E					
4	Canada	Kara Chad	Bellinda	0	8					
4	Canada	Yann Candele	Chaventyno	20	0					
4	Canada			1	12	13			€ 8,000	
5	Great Britain	Keith Shore	Mystic Hurricane	4	4					
5	Great Britain	Alison Barton	Roma IV	8	4					
5	Great Britain	Nigel Coupe	Golvers Hill	8	4					
5	Great Britain	Ben Maher	MTF Madame X	0	0					
5	Great Britain			12	8	20			€ 5,000	60
6	Mexico	José Alfredo Hernández	Grupo Prom Rahmannshof Before	17	9					
6	Mexico	Enrique González Delgado	Chacna	4	4					
6	Mexico	Patricio Pasquel	Babel	4	4					
6	Mexico	Federico Fernández Senderos	Landpeter do Feroleto	0	8					
6	Mexico			8	16	24			€ 5,000	
7	Germany	Rolf Moormann	Samba de Janeiro	4	8					
7	Germany	Andreas Knippling	Hertoch van T Prinsenveld	4	0					
7	Germany	Marc Bettinger	Amber	9	E					
7	Germany	Tobias Meyer	Avanti	8	4					
7	Germany			16	12	28			€ 3,000	
8	Spain	Manuel Fernández Saro	Santiago de Blondel	8	8					
8	Spain	Gonzalo Añón	Qlamp d'Ivraie	4	12					
8	Spain	Julio Arias	Lennox Luis	4	5					
8	Spain	Gerardo Menéndez	Cassino DC	0	8					
8	Spain			8	21	29			€ 3,000	
9	Egypt	Karim El Zoghby	Caveman DH Z	4						
9	Egypt	Wael Mahgary	Zamiro 16	10						
9	Egypt	Mohamed El Naggar	Jackobond P vd Zwartbleshoeve	41						
9	Egypt	Alaa Mayssara	Dittorio S	4						
9	Egypt			18						

== Gijón Grand Prix ==
The Gijón Grand Prix, the Show jumping Grand Prix of the 2017 CSIO Gijón, was the major show jumping competition at this event. The sponsor of this competition was Funeraria Gijonesa. It was held on Monday 4 August 2017. The competition was a show jumping competition over two rounds, the height of the fences were up to 1.60 meters.

It was endowed with 153,700 €.

Gerardo Menéndez was the first Spanish equestrian to win the Grand Prix 25 years after the last time.

	Rider	Horse	Round 1	Round 2		Total penalties	prize money
	Rider	Horse	Penalties	Penalties	Time (s)	Total penalties	prize money
1	(Spain) Gerardo Menéndez	Cassino DC	0	0	56.43	0	50,721 €
2	(Spain) Laura Roquet	Sandi Puigroq	0	0	56.53	0	30,740 €
3	(United Kingdom) Louise Saywell	Tin Tin	0	0	57.93	0	23,055 €
4	(Luxembourg) Victor Bettendorf	Gautcho da Quinta	0	0	58.55	0	15,370 €
5	(Germany) Tobias Meyer	Avanti	0	0	59.45	0	9,222 €
6	(Netherlands) Roelof Bril	Arlando	1	1	63.88	2	6,916 €
7	(Netherlands) Johnny Pals	Wesselina	4	0	42.52	4	4,611 €
8	(France) Julia Dallamano	Hoepala vh Daalhof	0	4	54.40	4	3,842 €
9	(Mexico) Patricio Pasquel	Babel	4	4	51.84	8	3,074 €
10	(France) Grégory Cottard	Régate d'Aure	4	4	52.05	4	3,074 €

(Top 10 of 45 Competitors)

== Winners by day ==
Day	Att.	Total prize (€)	Height	Winner	Horse	Results
Wednesday 30	2,613	7,620	1.40	(Republic of Ireland) Dermott Lennon	Gelvins Touch	
Wednesday 30	2,613	24,600	1.50	(Republic of Ireland) Dermott Lennon	Fleur IV	
Thursday 31	7,136	7,590	1.40	(Spain) Paola Amilibia	Notre Star de la Nutria	
Thursday 31	7,136	62,190	1.60	(France) Kevin Staut	For Joy van't Zorgvliet HD	
Friday 1	8,056	24,675	1.50	(Belgium) François Mathy Jr.	Casanova de l'Herse	
Friday 1	8,056	24,600	1.45	(France) Nicolas Delmotte	Darmani van T Heike	
Saturday 2	8,921	80,000	1.60	France		
Saturday 2	8,921	24,600	1.45	(France) Edward Levy	Rafale d'Hyverniere	
Sunday 3	7,426	9,000	1.40	(Australia) Rowan Willis	The Flying Fox III	
Sunday 3	7,426	33,180	1.50	(Australia) Rowan Willis	Dolores	
Monday 4	9,210	9,000	1.40	(Portugal) Luis Sabino Gonçalves	Hilde Imperio Egipcio	
Monday 4	9,210	153,700	1.60	(Spain) Gerardo Menéndez	Casino DC	
