= 2012 CSIO Gijón =

Show jumping event in Gijón, Spain

The 2012 CSIO Gijón was the 2012 edition of the Spanish official show jumping horse show, at Las Mestas Sports Complex in Gijón. It was held as CSIO 5*.

This edition of the CSIO Gijón was held between August 29 and September 3.

== Nations Cup ==
The 2012 FEI Nations Cup of Spain was the fifth competition of the 2012 FEI Nations Cup Promotional League and was held on Saturday, September 1, 2012.

The competition was a show jumping competition with two rounds. The height of the fences were up to 1.60 meters. The best six teams of the eleven which participated were allowed to start in the second round. As participant in the Promotional League, Denmark was also allowed to participate in the second round.

The competition was endowed with €64,000.

	Team	Rider	Horse	Round A	Round B	Total penalties	Jump-off		Prize €	scoring points
	Team	Rider	Horse	Penalties	Penalties	Total penalties	Penalties	Time (s)	Prize €	scoring points
1	France	Pénélope Leprevost	Mylord Carthago *HN	0	4					
1	France	Kevin Staut	Reveur de Hurtebise *HDC	4	0					
1	France	Marie Hecart	Myself de Breve	1	4					
1	France	Aymeric de Ponnat	Armitages Boy	5	NP					
1	France			5	8	13			20,000 €	-
2	Italy	Lucia Vizzini	Loro Piana Quinta Roo	17	4					
2	Italy	Roberto Arioldi	Loro Piana Lagerfeld 19	1	13					
2	Italy	Luca Marciani	Wivina	1	9					
2	Italy	Natale Chiaudani	Fixdesign Almero 12	0	4					
2	Italy			2	17	19			14,000 €	10
3	Great Britain	Daniel Neilson	Varo M	0	4					
3	Great Britain	Joe Clayton	Mr. Darcy	18	4					
3	Great Britain	Laura Renwick	Roller Coaster	8	8					
3	Great Britain	John Whitaker	Maximillian IV	5	10					
3	Great Britain			13	16	29			10,000 €	-
4	Ukraine	Cassio Rivetti	Temple Road	0	4					
4	Ukraine	Ferenc Szentirmai	Nifrane de Kreisker	8	16					
4	Ukraine	Bjorn Nagel	Niak de l'Abbaye	8	13					
4	Ukraine	Katharina Offel	Vivant	4	4					
4	Ukraine			12	21	33			8,000 €	7
5	Denmark	Søren Pedersen	Tailormade Esperanza de Rebel	4	9					
5	Denmark	Emilie Martinsen	Caballero 80	8	4					
5	Denmark	Charlotte von Rönne	Cartani 4	9	1					
5	Denmark	Thomas Sandgaard	Amarone	9	13					
5	Denmark			21	14	35			6,000 €	6
6	Spain	Pilar Lucrecia Cordón Muro	Nuage Bleu	4	8					
6	Spain	Carlos Catalán Casanovas	Carlos	10	E					
6	Spain	Paola Amilibia Puig	Prunella d'Ariel	5	0					
6	Spain	Manuel Añón Suárez	Rackel Chavannaise	4	17					
6	Spain			13	25	38			6,000 €	5
7	Canada	Lisa Carlsen	La Boom	1	4					
7	Canada	Tiffany Foster	Southwind VDL	12	12					
7	Canada	Jonathan Asselin	Showgirl	1	999 E					
7	Canada	Eric Lamaze	Verdi	R	NP					
7	Canada			17	16	30				-
8	United States	Reed Kessler	Mika	4						
8	United States	Katherine Dinan	Nougat du Vallet	E						
8	United States	Jessica Springsteen	Vornado van den Hoendrik	8						
8	United States	Laura Kraut	Belmont	4						
8	United States			16		16				-
9	Belgium	Maurice van Roosbroeck	Calumet	4						
9	Belgium	Rik Hemeryck	Papillon Z	16						
9	Belgium	Donaat Brondeel	Breemeersen Adorado	8						
9	Belgium	Dominique Hendricks	Cor van de Wateringhoeve	8						
9	Belgium			20		20				-
10	Netherlands	Vicent Voorn	Audi's Gestion Priamus Z	8						
10	Netherlands	Aniek Poels	Baggio 11	12						
10	Netherlands	Albert Voorn	Tobalio	8						
10	Netherlands	Wout-Jan van der Schans	Eurocommerce Seoul	16						
10	Netherlands			28		28				-
11	Germany	Holger Wulschner	Cavity G	12						
11	Germany	Marc Bettinger	Quannan-R	E						
11	Germany	Rolf Moormann	Acorte	4						
11	Germany	Lars Nieberg	Casallora	17						
11	Germany			33		33				-
12	Ireland	Billy Twomey	Romanov	15						
12	Ireland	Marion Hughes	Heritage HHS Fortuna	14						
12	Ireland	Trevor Coyle	Jubilee d'Ouilly	23						
12	Ireland	Conor Swail	Lansdowne	R						
12	Ireland			52		52				-
13	Portugal	Mário Wilson Fernandes	Valvarja	13						
13	Portugal	Gonçalo Barradas	Norton du Mancel	20						
13	Portugal	António Matos Almeida	Shining Star	E						
13	Portugal	Alexandre Mascarenhas de Lemos	Chiquitita 4	29						
13	Portugal			62		62				-

Grey penalties points do not count for the team result.

== Gijón Grand Prix ==
The Gijón Grand Prix, the Show jumping Grand Prix of the 2012 CSIO Gijón, was the major show jumping competition at this event. It was held on Monday 2 August 2013. The competition was a show jumping competition over two rounds, the height of the fences were up to 1.60 meters.

It was endowed with 125,000 €.

	Rider	Horse	Round 1	Round 2		Total penalties	prize money
	Rider	Horse	Penalties	Penalties	Time (s)	Total penalties	prize money
1	(Republic of Ireland) Trevor Coyle	Jubilee d'Ouilly	0	0	66.11	0	41,250 €
2	(France) Pénélope Leprevost	Mylord Carthago*HN	0	4	59.53	4	25,000 €
3	(United Kingdom) Laura Renwick	Oz de Breve	0	4	59.89	4	18,750 €
4	(Ukraine) Katarina Offel	Vivant	4	0	60.82	4	12,500 €
5	(United States) Katherine Dinan	Nougat du Valler	0	4	62.51	4	7,500 €
6	(Italy) Natale Chiaudani	Fixdesign Almero 12	0	4	64.57	4	5,625 €
7	(United Kingdom) Nick Skelton	Big Star	0	5	77.92	5	3,750 €
8	(France) Patrice Delaveau	Ornella Mail HDC	4	4	58.25	8	3,125 €
9	(Canada) Jonathan Asselin	Showgirl	0	8	72.29	8	2,500 €
10	(United States) Reed Kessler	Mika	4	8	60.44	12	2,500 €

(Top 10 of 45 Competitors)
