= Manuel da Costa (equestrian) =

Portuguese equestrian

Personal information
- Nationality: Portuguese
- Born: 19 June 1946; Lisbon, Portugal
- Died: 19 August 2014 (aged 68); Lisbon, Portugal

Sport
- Sport: Equestrian

Manuel da Costa (19 June 1946 – 19 August 2014) was a Portuguese equestrian. He competed in the individual jumping event at the 1988 Summer Olympics.
