= António Vozone =

Portuguese equestrian

Personal information
- Nationality: Portuguese
- Born: 16 June 1960 (age 64); Lisbon, Portugal

Sport
- Sport: Equestrian

António Vozone (born 16 June 1960) is a Portuguese equestrian. He competed in the individual jumping event at the 1996 Summer Olympics.
