= Duarte Seabra =

Portuguese equestrian

Personal information
- Nationality: Portuguese
- Born: 22 November 1985 (age 40) Santarém, Portugal

Sport
- Country: Portugal
- Sport: Equestrian
- Event: Show jumping

Duarte Seabra (born 12 november 1985) is a Portuguese show jumping competitor. He represented Portugal at the 2018 FEI World Equestrian Games in Tryon in 2018, and at the 2023 European Championships in Milan. As individual he has qualified for the 2024 Summer Olympics in Paris.
