= Emanuele Camilli =

Italian equestrian (born 1982)

Personal information
- Born: 17 October 1982 (age 43) Rome, Italy

Sport
- Country: Italy
- Sport: Equestrian
- Event: Show jumping
- Coached by: Marco Porro

Achievements and titles
- Olympic finals: 2024 Olympic Games

Emanuele Camilli (born 17 October 1982 in Rome, Italy) is an Olympic Italian show jumping rider. He competed at the 2023 European Championships and at the 2022 World Championships in Herning.

In 2024 he is set to compete at the 2024 Summer Olympics in Paris.
