= Luis Álvarez de Cervera =

Spanish equestrian (born 1947)

Medal record

Equestrian

Representing Spain

Mediterranean Games
Gold medal – first place	1983 Casablanca	Team jumping
Bronze medal – third place	1979 Split	Team jumping

Luis Álvarez de Cervera (born 23 July 1947 in Madrid) is a Spanish equestrian who competed at six Olympic Games between 1972 and 1996. He was the first Spaniard to do so; as of 2010, the only other Spaniard to compete at six Olympics is water polo player Manuel Estiarte.

He was part of the Spanish team that came fourth in the Mixed Jumping at the 1992 Barcelona Olympics, missing out on bronze by 0.75 points.

Luis Álvarez de Cervera collaborated, together with the also prominent Olympic riders Joaquín Larraín Coddou and Luis Lucio, in the Spanish translation made by the Panamanian rider Anastasios Moschos of the official instruction handbook of the German National Equestrian Federation, Tecnicas Avanzadas de Equitación - Manual Oficial de Instrucción de la Federación Ecuestre Alemana. This Spanish edition was foreworded by the former president of the International Federation for Equestrian Sports (FEI), the Infanta Doña Pilar, Duchess of Badajoz and was published in Spain and Latin America.

== Personal ==
His son, Eduardo Álvarez Aznar, is also an equestrian. He competed in the 2016 Olympic Games.

== See also ==
- List of athletes with the most appearances at Olympic Games
