= Greg Broderick =

Irish show jumper

Personal information
- Born: September 21, 1985 (age 40)

Greg Patrick Broderick (born 21 September 1985) is an Irish show jumping rider from Thurles, County Tipperary. He represented Ireland at the 2015 European Show Jumping Championships in Aachen, Germany, where he achieved 7th place in team and 31st place in the individual jumping competition.

Broderick has been selected to compete at the 2016 Summer Olympics in Rio de Janeiro with his Irish Sport Horse Going Global. Broderick has recently sold MHS Going Global for between 10 and 12 million euro making it the most expensive show jumping horse to be sold out of Ireland but also one of the most expensive in the world.
