= Leon Thijssen =

Dutch equestrian

Leon Thijssen (born 15 January 1968, in Baarlo) is a Dutch show jumper.

Thijssen won his first international tournament in 2000, when he won the Grand Prix meeting in Vilamoura with his horse Hickory. A year later in Madrid he won the Super League meeting with Hot Shot. It took him until 2004 to reach another international podium, but he managed to achieve a second place in Birmingham and a third place in Zuidlaren, both on Nairobi. He was successful in two Super League meetings in 2005 with a second place in Aachen and a first position in Barcelona.

With his horse Olaf he won the 2006 Grand Prix in Madrid and later that year he became second at the Grand Prix meeting in De Steeg. In 2007 his best results were on Nairobi again, when he won the Grand Prix meetings in Valkenswaard and Maastricht. They also finished on the second spot at the Spruce Meadows Super League meeting. With Olaf he reached the third spot in the Super League meeting in Lummen. Then in 2008 he won his second career title in De Steeg, again with Olaf. Thijssen was selected by coach Rob Ehrens as a reserve to represent the Netherlands at the 2008 Summer Olympics in Beijing. Former Olympic champion Jeroen Dubbeldam and Albert Zoer had to withdraw due to injuries and were replaced by Marc Houtzager and Angelique Hoorn. The rest of the team exists of Gerco Schröder and Vincent Voorn.
