= Tim Stockdale =

English equestrian (1964–2018)

Personal information
- Full name: Timothy Mark Stockdale
- Nationality: British
- Discipline: Show jumping
- Born: 12 August 1964; Worksop, England
- Died: 14 November 2018 (aged 54)
- Height: 5 ft 10 in (1.78 m)
- Weight: 176 lb (80 kg; 12 st 8 lb)

Timothy Mark Stockdale (12 August 1964 – 14 November 2018) was an English equestrian who competed in show jumping.

== Early life ==
Stockdale grew up in Retford in north Nottinghamshire. He attended the Sir Frederick Milner Secondary Modern School (later Retford Oaks Academy).

== Career ==
Stockdale competed in international competitions and rode several horses, owned by him and others. He produced a three-part training video titled Successful Showjumping With Tim Stockdale.

Stockdale had a show jumping career on several different horses. In 2000, he and Traxdata Winston Bridget placed sixth in the London Olympia CSIW Grand Prix. In 2002, he represented Great Britain at the World Equestrian Games in Jerez, Spain with Fresh Direct Parcival. 2006 saw Stockdale narrowly miss out on the Olympia Grand Prix title to Eugenie Angot, coming second on Fresh Direct Corlato, a mare with whom greater things would come. In 2007, Stockdale won the Nantes Grand Prix and Bordeaux Grand Prix with Corlato on consecutive weekends, and placed fifth in the CN International "Million Dollar" Grand Prix.

Stockdale was set on getting to the Beijing Olympics in 2008, shown by his decision not to take his qualified place at the FEI World Cup Finals in Gothenburg. His performances at the Samsung Super League Nations' Cup competitions in Rome and St. Gallen were enough to cement him a place on the 2008 squad; he had produced his horse from a four-year-old. Despite the British team finishing 6th, Stockdale qualified for the individual final, producing a clear in the first round, one of nine riders to do so. He could not repeat his performance in the second round and finished best of the British in 16th place.

Stockdale completed his championship appearance hat-trick by representing Great Britain at the 2009 European Championships at Windsor Park with Fresh Direct Corlato after helping the British team to second place in the Dublin CSIO***** Nations' Cup. The loss of his top horse, Corlato, due to an injury sustained at Spruce Meadows in 2009, coincided with the rise of the ISH gelding Fresh Direct Kalico Bay to form. Stockdale and Kalico Bay won three international grands prix the following year, including the King George V Gold Cup at Hickstead, which served as retribution after the last fence in the jump off denied Stockdale the title with Corlato in 2009. This form continued on British soil with Kalico Bay placing in both the Horse of the Year Show and Olympia grands prix.

2011 brought Nations' Cup appearances at St. Gallen and Falsterbo for Stockdale, as well as a near-defence of his King George V title, However, on 17 October, while trying a young horse at a small farm in rural Wales, Stockdale sustained fractures to three vertebrae in his neck in a fall. Four months after his accident, he was back riding, which was considered impossible. Once back in the saddle, he embarked upon a course to qualify for the 2012 Olympics in London, described as "one of the most remarkable comebacks by a British athlete in Olympic history." At the CSIO***** Nations' Cup of St. Gallen, he and Fresh Direct Kalico Bay produced one of three double clears to lead Great Britain to second place, and take second place in the Longines Grand Prix of St. Gallen. At the Nations' Cup of Rotterdam, the pair did not reproduce their form and, though they were short-listed for the British squad, they did not make the final team.

Stockdale was also a trainer in show jumping, having taught celebrities to show jump in the Sport Relief series Only Fools on Horses aired in 2006.

Stockdale was banned from Olympic competition in July 2002 when his horse's urine tested positive for a prohibited sedative. However, he was reinstated in 2004 when the British Olympic Association deemed his offence minor, also taking into account that it did not meet the chief intent of the lifetime ban to cover offences involving drugs "of a performance-enhancing nature." This made him eligible to compete at the 2004 Athens Olympics, although he did not make the team.

== Personal life ==
He lived in Roade, then in South Northamptonshire. His son Joe Stockdale is also a show jumper.

== Death ==
Stockdale died on 14 November 2018 at the age of 54 after a short illness, suffering from stomach cancer.
