= Jur Vrieling =

Dutch show jumper

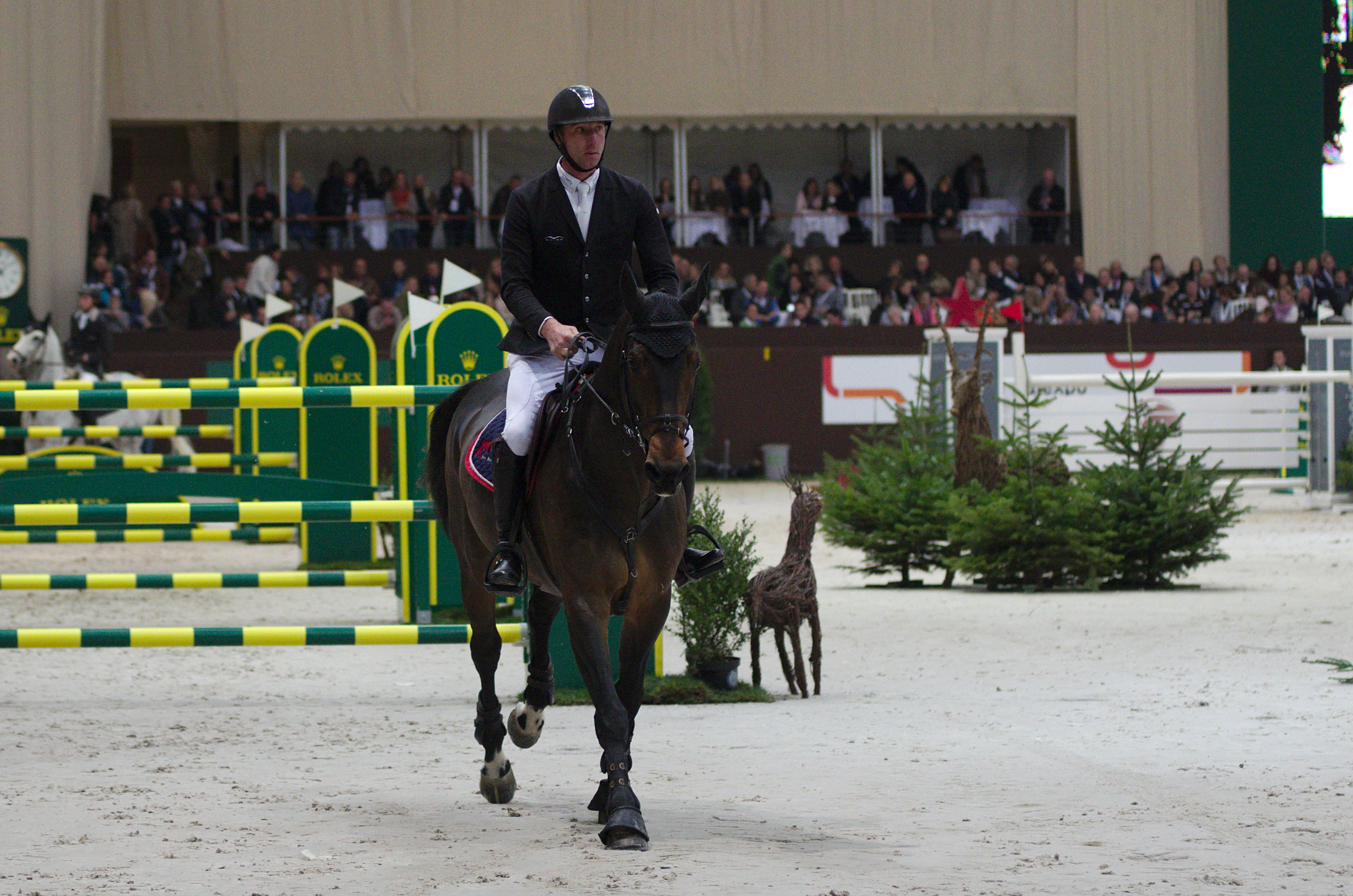
- Vrieling and Bubalu (2014)

Personal information
- Full name: Jan Johannes Vrieling
- Nationality: Dutch
- Born: 31 July 1969 (age 55); Slochteren, Groningen
- Height: 186 cm (6 ft 1 in)
- Weight: 81 kg (179 lb)
Medal record
Equestrian
Representing the Netherlands
Olympic Games
Silver medal – second place	2012 London	Team jumping
World Championships
Gold medal – first place	2014 Normandy	Team jumping
Silver medal – second place	2022 Herning	Team jumping
European Championships
Gold medal – first place	2015 Aachen	Team jumping

Jan Johannes "Jur" Vrieling (born 31 July 1969) is a Dutch show jumping rider. He was born in Slochteren. He competed at the 2012 Summer Olympics and the 2016 Summer Olympics.

== 2016 disqualification ==
In the 2016 Olympics in Rio, Vrieling was disqualified after causing his horse Zirocco Blue to bleed during the competition in violation of Article 242.3.1 of the FEI Jumping Rules: Horses bleeding on the flank(s), in the mouth or nose or marks indicating excessive use of spurs or of the whip anywhere on the Horse.
