= Eduardo Álvarez Aznar =

Spanish equestrian

Eduardo Álvarez
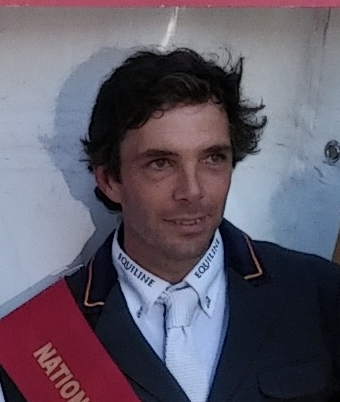
- Álvarez in 2018

Personal information
- Full name: Eduardo Luis Álvarez Aznar
- Nationality: Spanish
- Born: 1 January 1984 (age 42) Madrid, Spain
- Height: 173 cm (5 ft 8 in)
- Weight: 67 kg (148 lb)

Sport
- Country: Spain
- Sport: Equestrian

Eduardo Luis Álvarez Aznar (born 1 January 1984) is a Spanish equestrian. He competed in the individual jumping competition at the 2016 Summer Olympics.

Eduardo is a son of six-time Olympian Luis Álvarez de Cervera.
