= Rutherford Latham =

Spanish equestrian (born 1954)

Personal information
- Nationality: Spanish
- Born: 7 October 1954 (age 70); Madrid, Spain

Sport
- Sport: Equestrian

Rutherford Latham (born 7 October 1954) is a Spanish equestrian. He competed at the 1984 Summer Olympics, the 1996 Summer Olympics and the 2000 Summer Olympics.
