= Michel Robert (equestrian) =

French equestrian

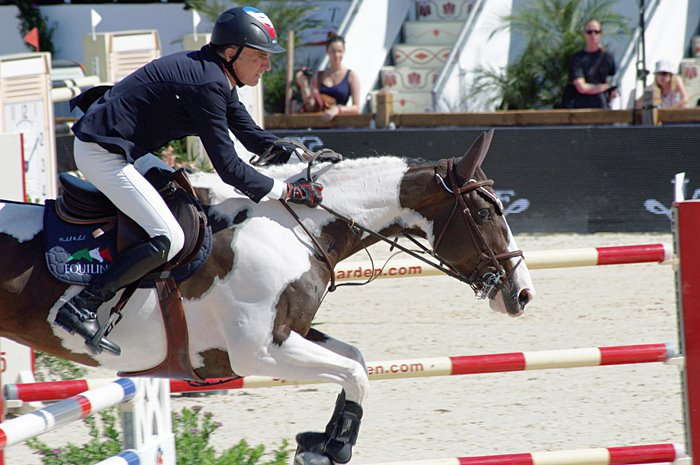

Medal record

Equestrian

Representing France

Olympic Games
Bronze medal – third place	1988 Seoul	Team jumping
Bronze medal – third place	1992 Barcelona	Team jumping

Michel Robert (24 December 1948, Corbelin) is a leading French international Grand Prix show jumping equestrian. He was born on 24 December 1948 in Corbelin. Michel Robert started riding at the age of four on a sheep, complete with saddle and bridle. He advocates a style of riding based on "respect for and harmony with the horse." He began his career in eventing, and later specialized in show jumping. In October 2013, he announced his decision to retire from Grand Prix level competition.

On January 1, 2014, he was awarded the French Legion of Honour. He was the final winner of the Global Champions Tour for 2009. He is a three-time Olympic equestrian.
