= Patrice Delaveau =

French show jumping rider

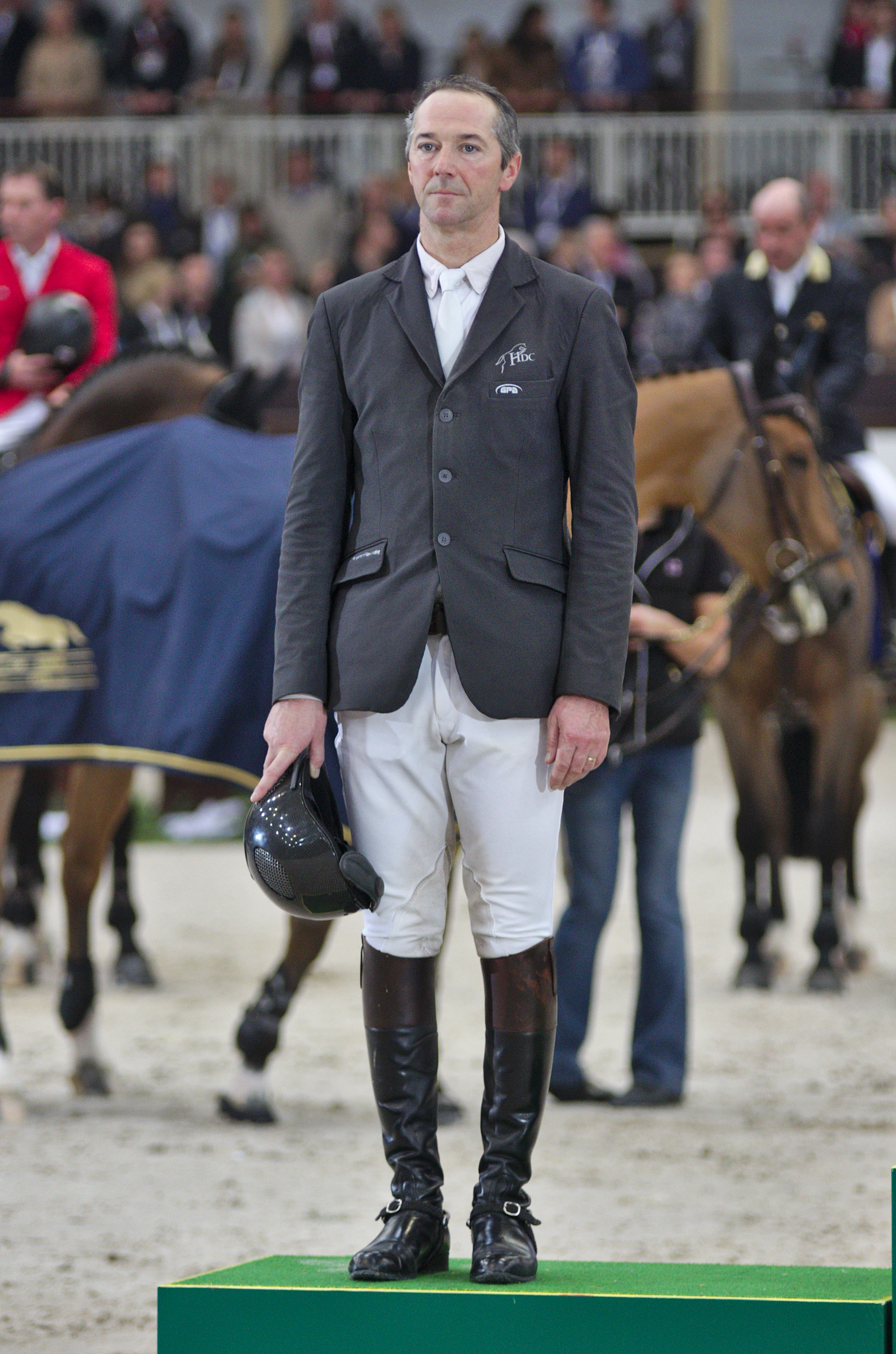
- Patrice Delaveau (2013)

Personal information
- Born: 27 January 1965 (age 61) Rambouillet, France
Medal record
Equestrian
Representing France
World Championships
Silver medal – second place	2010 Kentucky	Team jumping
Silver medal – second place	2014 Normandy	Individual jumping
Silver medal – second place	2014 Normandy	Team jumping
Bronze medal – third place	1986 Aachen	Team jumping

Patrice Delaveau (born 27 January 1965 in Rambouillet, France) is a French Olympic show jumping rider. He competed at two Summer Olympics (in 1996 and 2000). He finished 4th in team jumping on both occasions. Meanwhile, his current best individual Olympic placement is 35th position from 2000.

Delaveau has won multiple medals at the World Championships level (three silver and one bronze). He also took part at two European Show Jumping Championships (in 1997 and 2013) and six editions of Show Jumping World Cup finals (in 1996, 2010, 2012, 2014, 2015 and 2016). He finished 4th twice at the European Championships, both times in the team event.

He was previously married to Eugénie Angot (née Legrand), equestrian and daughter of composer Michel Legrand. They had a daughter, Camille Delaveau (born circa 1994). He subsequently married journalist Sabrine Delaveau. They had two daughters, Valentine (born circa 2002) and Capucine. Both Camille and Valentine followed in his footsteps.
