= Manuel Fernández Saro =

Spanish equestrian

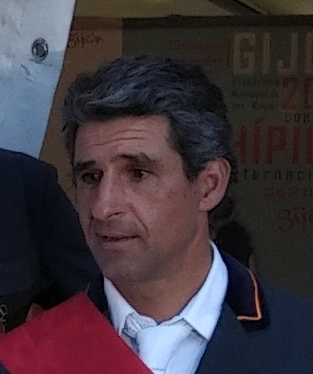

Personal information
- Full name: Manuel Fernández Saro
- Nationality: Spain
- Discipline: Jumping
- Born: 27 January 1975 (age 50)
- Height: 1.78 m (5 ft 10 in)
- Weight: 67 kg (148 lb)

Manuel Fernández Saro (born 27 January 1975) is a Spanish show jumping rider. He competed at the 2016 Summer Olympics in Rio de Janeiro, Brazil, where he placed 11th in the team and 38th in the individual competition.

Fernandez participated at the 2006 World Equestrian Games and at three European Show Jumping Championships (in 2005, 2013 and 2015). He finished 6th in the team competition at the 2015 European Championships held in Aachen, Germany. His best individual performance is 14th place from 2005.
