= 2010 Royal International Horse Show =

The 2010 Longines Royal International Horse Show was that year's edition of the Royal International Horse Show, the British official show jumping competition at All England Jumping Course at Hickstead. It was held as CSIO 5* and CDI 5*.

The 2010 edition of the Royal International Horse Show was held between 29 July and 1 August 2010.

== FEI Nations Cup of Great Britain ==
The 2010 FEI Nations Cup of the United Kingdom is part of the 2010 Royal International Horse Show. It was the seventh competition of the 2010 Meydan FEI Nations Cup.

The 2010 FEI Nations Cup of the United Kingdom was held on Friday 30 July 2010 at 1:45 pm. The competing teams were: France, the United States of America, Germany, Switzerland, the Netherlands, Ireland, Sweden, Great Britain and Spain (the team of Poland did not start in this competition).

The competition was a show jumping competition with two rounds and optionally one jump-off. The height of the fences were up to 1.60 meters. Eight of ten (here: eight of nine) teams are allowed to start in the second round.

The competition was endowed with 200,000 €.

	Team	Rider	Horse	Round A	Round B	Total penalties	Jump-off		Prize money	Scoring points
	Team	Rider	Horse	Penalties	Penalties	Total penalties	Penalties	Time (s)	Prize money	Scoring points
1	(United Kingdom) Great Britain	Peter Charles	Pom D'Ami	1	1					
1	(United Kingdom) Great Britain	William Funnell	Billy Congo	1	1					
1	(United Kingdom) Great Britain	Tina Fletcher	Hello Sailor	2	1					
1	(United Kingdom) Great Britain	Michael Whitaker	Amai	8	did not start					
1	(United Kingdom) Great Britain			4	3	7			64,000 €	10
2	Germany	Daniel Deußer	Cabreado S.E.	5	0					
2	Germany	Jörg Naeve	Calado	5	9					
2	Germany	Philipp Weishaupt	Catoki	9	8					
2	Germany	Lars Nieberg	Lord Luis	4	0					
2	Germany			14	8	22			40,000 €	7
3	United States	Cara Raether	Ublesco	8	4					
3	United States	Robert Kraut	Kraf Lando	33	17					
3	United States	McLain Ward	Rothchild	5	0					
3	United States	Rich Fellers	Flexible	8	4					
3	United States			21	8	29			32,000 €	6
4	France	Kevin Staut	Silvana	12	0					
4	France	Julien Epaillard	Mister Davier	17	0					
4	France	Marie Etter Pellegrin	Admirable	4	5					
4	France	Nicolas Delmotte	Luccianno	13	13					
4	France			29	5	34			24,000 €	5
5	Netherlands	Jur Vrieling	Bubalou	1	9					
5	Netherlands	Harrie Smolders	Walnut de Muze	12	0					
5	Netherlands	Marc Houtzager	Opium VS	9	8					
5	Netherlands	Nathalie van der Mei	Tersina	9	8					
5	Netherlands			19	16	35			16,000 €	4
6	Ireland	Shane Breen	Carmena Z	12	9					
6	Ireland	Dermott Lennon	Hallmark Elite	9	eliminated					
6	Ireland	Billy Twomey	J'Taime Flamenco	5	1					
6	Ireland	Denis Lynch	Nabab's Son	12	0					
6	Ireland			26	10	36			11,000 €	3
7	Spain	Pilar Lucrecia Cordon Muro	Herald	16	0					
7	Spain	Fernando Fourcadez	New Remake de Servery	16	0					
7	Spain	Jesus Garmendia Echevarria	Lord du Mont Milon	16	4					
7	Spain	Sergio Alvarez Moya	Action-Breaker	4	5					
7	Spain			36	4	40			6,500 €	1.5
7	Sweden	Malin Baryard-Johnsson	Actrice W	5	5					
7	Sweden	Peder Fredricson	Arctic Aurora Borealis	4	12					
7	Sweden	Henrik von Eckermann	Paola	9	5					
7	Sweden	Rolf-Göran Bengtsson	Quintero	9	13					
7	Sweden			18	22	40			6,500 €	1.5
9	Switzerland	Steve Guerdat	Tresor V	8						
9	Switzerland	Werner Muff	Kiamon	16						
9	Switzerland	Jane Richard	Zekina Z	32						
9	Switzerland	Pius Schwizer	Ulysse X	12						
9	Switzerland			36					-	0

(grey penalties points do not count for the team result)

== Grand Prix Spécial (B-Final) ==
The 2010 Royal International Horse Show was the venue of the third competition of the World Dressage Masters (WDM) - rider ranking, season 2010/2011.

All competitors starts first in the Grand Prix de Dressage at Thursday. The eight best-placed competitors of the Grand Prix de Dressage are allowed to start in the A-Final (the Grand Prix Freestyle). It some of best-placed competitors want to start in the B-Final, the same number of competitors, who are placed after the best-placed competitors, move up in the A-Final.

The B-Final of the World Dressage Masters competitions at 2010 Royal International Horse Show was held on Sunday 1 August 2010. It was endowed with 30,000 €. The B-Final was held as Grand Prix Spécial, the competition with the highest definite level of dressage competitions.

	Rider	Horse	Score
1	(United Kingdom) Carl Hester	Liebling II	72.420 %
2	(Australia) Brett Parbery	Victory Salute	70.170 %
3	(United Kingdom) Maria Eilberg	Two Sox	69.880 %

(top 3 of 10 competitors)

== Grand Prix Freestyle (A-Final) ==
The Grand Prix Freestyle (or Grand Prix Kür) was the A-Final of the World Dressage Masters competitions at 2010 Royal International Horse Show (see also Grand Prix Spécial).

A Grand Prix Freestyle was a Freestyle dressage competition. The level of this competition is at least the level of a Grand Prix de Dressage, but it can be higher than the level of a Grand Prix Spécial.

The Grand Prix Freestyle at 2010 Royal International Horse Show was held on Sunday 1 August 2010 after the Grand Prix Spécial. It was endowed with 60,000 €.

	Rider	Horse	Score
1	(Netherlands) Adelinde Cornelissen	Parzival	85.650 %
2	(Netherlands) Hans Peter Minderhoud	Nadine	78.850 %
3	(United Kingdom) Laura Bechtolsheimer	Andretti	78.250 %
4	(Germany) Anja Plönzke	Le Mont d'Or	75.050 %
5	(Poland) Michal Rapcewicz	Randon	72.900 %

(top 5 of 8 competitors)

== The Longines King Georges V Gold Cup ==
The King Georges V Gold Cup, the Show jumping Grand Prix of the 2010 Royal International Horse Show, was the mayor show jumping competition at this event. The sponsor of this competition is Longines. It was held on Sunday 1 August 2010 at 2:45 pm. The competition was a show jumping competition with one round and one jump-off, the height of the fences were up to 1.60 meters.

It was endowed with £200,000.

	Rider	Horse	Round 1	jump-off		prize money
	Rider	Horse	Penalties	Penalties	Time (s)	prize money
1	(United Kingdom) Tim Stockdale	Kalico Bay	0	0	57.65	64,000 £
2	(United Kingdom) Robert Smith	Talan	0	0	59.53	40,000 £
3	(France) Kevin Staut	Le Prestige St Lois	0	4	56.83	32,000 £
4	(United Kingdom) William Funnell	Billy Congo	0	4	59.55	24,000 £
5	(United Kingdom) Ellen Whitaker	Locarno	0	4	61.97	14,000 £

(Top 5 of 44 Competitors)
