= 2010 CHIO Rotterdam =

The 2010 CHIO Rotterdam was the 2010 edition of the CHIO Rotterdam, the Dutch official show jumping and dressage horse show. It was held as CSIO 5* and CDIO 5*.

The first (national) horse show were held 1937 in Rotterdam, in 1948 it became an international horse show.

The 2010 edition of the CHIO Rotterdam was held between June 16, 2010 and June 20, 2010. The main sponsor of the 2010 CHIO Rotterdam horse show is LSI project investment.

== Nations Cup of the Netherlands (dressage) ==
The 2010 dressage Nations Cup of the Netherlands was part of the 2010 CHIO Rotterdam horse show. Teams of six nations took part in this competition. The competition was held at June 17, 2010.

=== Team result ===
The team ranking of this competition was endowed with 41,000 €.

	Team	Rider	Horse	Score	Prize money
1	Netherlands	Hans Peter Minderhoud	Nadine	72.644 %	
1	Netherlands	Imke Schellekens-Bartels	Sunrise	74.225 %	
1	Netherlands	Adelinde Cornelissen	Parzival	78.480 %	
1	Netherlands	Edward Gal	Moorlands Totilas	82.705 %	
1	Netherlands			78.470 %	12,000 €
2	Germany	Hubertus Schmidt	Donnelly	69.058 %	
2	Germany	Christoph Koschel	Donnperignon	72.675 %	
2	Germany	Monica Theodorescu	Whisper	70.638 %	
2	Germany	Matthias-Alexander Rath	Sterntaler-UNICEF	73.283 %	
2	Germany			72.199 %	10,000 €
3	Canada	Ashley Holzer	Pop Art	68.450 %	
3	Canada	Belinda Trussell	Anton	67.386 %	
3	Canada	Bonny Bonnello	Pikardi	65.897 %	
3	Canada	Shannon Dueck	Ayscha	retired	
3	Canada			67.244 %	8,000 €
4	Sweden	Anette Christensson	Normandie JB	63.647 %	
4	Sweden	Charlotte Haid Bondergaard	Lydianus	63.009 %	
4	Sweden	Patrik Kittel	Florett AS	68.207 %	
4	Sweden	Tinne Vilhelmson-Silfven	Favourit	68.541 %	
4	Sweden			66.798 %	6,000 €
5	Belgium	Claudia Fassaert	Donnerfee	64.620 %	
5	Belgium	Fanny Verliefden	Rubel	63.344 %	
5	Belgium	Marc Peter Spahn	Cas	65.137 %	
5	Belgium	Philippe Jorissen	Le Beau	66.292 %	
5	Belgium			65.349 %	5,000 €
6	Denmark	–			
6	Denmark	Jeanette Sund	Aquino	63.495 %	
6	Denmark	Lars Petersen	Beemer	60.122 %	
6	Denmark	Anne Troensegaard	Seduc	retired	
6	Denmark			eliminated	-

(grey penalties points do not count for the team result)

=== Individual results ===
	Rider	Horse	Score
1	Edward Gal	Totilas	82.705 %
2	Adelinde Cornelissen	Parzival	78.480 %
3	Imke Schellekens-Bartels	Sunrise	74.225 %
4	Matthias-Alexander Rath	Sterntaler-UNICEF	73.283 %
5	Christoph Koschel	Donnperignon	72.675 %

== FEI Nations Cup of the Netherlands (show jumping) ==
The 2010 FEI Nations Cup of the Netherlands was part of the 2010 CHIO Rotterdam. It was the fourth competition of the 2010 Meydan FEI Nations Cup.

The 2010 FEI Nations Cup of the Netherlands was held at Friday, June 18, 2010 at 2:30 pm. The competing teams were: France, the United States of America, Germany, Switzerland, the Netherlands, Ireland, Sweden, the United Kingdom (Great Britain), Spain and Poland.

The competition was a show jumping competition with two rounds and optionally one jump-off. The height of the fences were up to 1.60 meters. Eight of ten teams were allowed to start in the second round.

The competition is endowed with 200,000 €.

	Team	Rider	Horse	Round A	Round B	Total penalties	Jump-off		Prize money	Scoring points
	Team	Rider	Horse	Penalties	Penalties	Total penalties	Penalties	Time (s)	Prize money	Scoring points
1	United States	Lauren Hough	Quick Study	0	0					
1	United States	Candice King	Skara Glen's Davos	0	0					
1	United States	Nicole Shahinian Simpson	Tristan	4	1					
1	United States	Laura Kraut	Cedric	0	0					
1	United States			0	0	0			64,000 €	10
2	Great Britain	Peter Charles	Pom d'Ami	0	1					
2	Great Britain	David McPherson	Chamberlain Z	1	4					
2	Great Britain	Scott Brash	Intertoy Z	4	4					
2	Great Britain	John Whitaker	Peppermill	1	0					
2	Great Britain			2	5	7			40,000 €	7
3	Netherlands	Vincent Voorn	Alpapillon-Armanie	16	0					
3	Netherlands	Eric van der Vleuten	Utascha SFN	0	0					
3	Netherlands	Harrie Smolders	Walnut de Muze	0	4					
3	Netherlands	Marc Houtzager	Tamino	4	4					
3	Netherlands			4	4	8			32,000 €	6
4	Germany	Marcus Ehning	Küchengirl	4	0					
4	Germany	Janne Friederike Meyer	Lambrasco	1	0					
4	Germany	Carsten-Otto Nagel	Corradina	8	0					
4	Germany	Ludger Beerbaum	Gotha	4	4					
4	Germany			9	0	9			24,000 €	5
5	Spain	Pilar Lucrecia Cordon Muro	Herald	5	1					
5	Spain	Julio Arias Cueva	Jarnac	4	1					
5	Spain	Jesus Garmendia Echevarria	Lord du Mont Milon	5	8					
5	Spain	Sergio Alvarez Moya	Mme Pompadour M	0	1					
5	Spain			9	3	12			13,500 €	3.5
5	France	Pénélope Leprevost	Topinambour	4	5					
5	France	Michel Robert	Kellemoi de Pepita	0	0					
5	France	Marie Etter Pellegrin	Admirable	5	4					
5	France	Kevin Staut	Kraque Boom	4	0					
5	France			8	4	12			13,500 €	3.5
7	Switzerland	Steve Guerdat	Ferrari	12	0					
7	Switzerland	Jane Richard	Zekina Z	4	4					
7	Switzerland	Werner Muff	Campione CH	4	4					
7	Switzerland	Pius Schwizer	Carlina K	8	5					
7	Switzerland			16	8	24			6,500 €	1.5
7	Ireland	Denis Lynch	Abbervail van het Dingeshof	8	0					
7	Ireland	David O'Brien	Kiltoom	8	12					
7	Ireland	Jessica Kürten	Myrtille Paulois	4	4					
7	Ireland	Shane Breen	Carmena Z	0	8					
7	Ireland			12	12	24			6,500 €	1.5
9	Sweden	Jens Fredricson	Lunatic	8						
9	Sweden	Henrik von Eckermann	Paola	8						
9	Sweden	Peder Fredricson	Arctic Aurora Borealis	5						
9	Sweden	Rolf-Göran Bengtsson	Kiara	13						
9	Sweden			21					-	0
10	Poland	Jaroslaw Skrzyczynski	Coriana	5						
10	Poland	Antoni Tomaszewski	Trojka	8						
10	Poland	Dawid Rakoczy	Rotmistrz	25						
10	Poland	Aleksandra Lusina	Castello	13						
10	Poland			26					-	0

(grey penalties points do not count for the team result)

== Grand Prix Freestyle ==
The InterChem prijs, the Grand Prix Freestyle (or Grand Prix Kür) of the 2010 CHIO Rotterdam, was the final competition of the CDIO 5* at the 2010 CHIO Rotterdam. InterChem was the sponsor of this competition.

The competition was held at Saturday, June 19, 2010 at 8:00 pm. It is endowed with 50,000 €.

	Rider	Horse	Score	Prize money
1	Edward Gal	Totilas	90.143 %	12,000 €
2	Adelinde Cornelissen	Parzival	83.929 %	10,000 €
3	Imke Schellekens-Bartels	Sunrise	81.250 %	8,000 €
4	Christoph Koschel	Donnperignon	78.000 %	6,000 €
5	Matthias-Alexander Rath	Sterntaler-UNICEF	77.393 %	5,000 €

(Top 5 of 12 Competitors)

== Longines Grand Prix Port of Rotterdam ==
The Grand Prix was the mayor show jumping competition of the 2010 CHIO Rotterdam. The sponsor of this competition was Longines. It was held at Sunday, June 20, 2010 at 2:30 pm. The competition was a show jumping competition with one round and one jump-off, the height of the fences were up to 1.60 meters.

	Rider	Horse	Round 1	jump-off		prize money
	Rider	Horse	Penalties	Penalties	Time (s)	prize money
1	(Sweden) Rolf-Göran Bengtsson	Casall	0	0	39.43	50,000 €
2	(France) Pénélope Leprevost	Mylord Carthago	0	0	40.48	40,000 €
3	(United States) Laura Kraut	Cedric	0	0	41.27	25,000 €
3	(Germany) Carsten-Otto Nagel	Corradina	0	0	41.27	25,000 €
5	(Switzerland) Pius Schwizer	Carlina K	0	4	40.12	14,000 €

(Top 5 of 50 Competitors)
