= 2010 Piazza di Siena =

The 2010 Piazza di Siena – CSIO Rome was the 2010 edition of the CSIO Rome, the Italian official show jumping horse show, at the Piazza di Siena in Rome. It was held as CSIO 5*.

The first horse show were held 1922 at the Piazza di Siena, in 1926 it was an international horse show. Since 1928 Rome is the location of the Italian official show jumping horse show (CSIO = Concours de Saut International Officiel). 2010 is the 78th edition of the CSIO Rome.

The 2010 edition of the CSIO Rome was held between May 27, 2010 and May 30, 2010. The main sponsor of the Piazza di Siena 2010 horse show is SNAI.

== FEI Nations Cup of Italy ==
The 2010 FEI Nations Cup of Italy was part of the Piazza di Siena 2010 horse show. It was the second competition of the 2010 Meydan FEI Nations Cup.

The 2010 FEI Nations Cup of Italy was held at Friday, May 28, 2010 at 3:10 pm. The competing teams were: France, the United States of America, Germany, Switzerland, the Netherlands, Ireland, Sweden, the United Kingdom, Spain and Poland. Also the team of Italy had as host nation the chance to start in the competition.

The competition was a show jumping competition with two rounds and optionally one jump-off. The height of the fences were up to 1.60 meters. Eight of ten teams were allowed to start in the second round.

The competition was endowed with 200,000 €.

	Team	Rider	Horse	Round A	Round B	Total penalties	Jump-off		Prize money	Scoring points
	Team	Rider	Horse	Penalties	Penalties	Total penalties	Penalties	Time (s)	Prize money	Scoring points
1	France	Penelope Leprevost	Mylord Carthago	0	0					
1	France	Kevin Staut	Silvana	4	0					
1	France	Nicolas Delmotte	Luccianno	8	0					
1	France	Patrice Delaveau	Katchina Mail	0	did not start					
1	France			4	0	4			64,000 €	10
2	United Kingdom	Nick Skelton	Carlo	4	0					
2	United Kingdom	Peter Charles	Pom d'Ami	0	4					
2	United Kingdom	Ben Maher	Robin Hood W	16	0					
2	United Kingdom	John Whitaker	Peppermill	4	0					
2	United Kingdom			8	0	8			40,000 €	7
3	Ireland	Cameron Hanley	Southwind	8	0					
3	Ireland	Darragh Kenny	Obelix	4	8					
3	Ireland	Cian O'Connor	K Club Lady	4	0					
3	Ireland	Billy Twomey	Tinka's Serenade	0	4					
3	Ireland			8	4	12			27,500 €	5.5
3	Spain	Pilar Lucrecia Cordon Muro	Herald	0	0					
3	Spain	Julio Arias Cueva	Jarnac	0	4					
3	Spain	Jesus Garmendia Echevarria	Lord du Mont Milon	4	4					
3	Spain	Ricardo Jurado Narvaez	Julia des Brumes	8	8					
3	Spain			4	8	12			27,500 €	5.5
5	Germany	Janne Friederike Meyer	Lambrasco	0	0					
5	Germany	Max Kühner	Coeur de Lion	8	12					
5	Germany	Rebecca Golasch	Lassen Peak	8	0					
5	Germany	Philipp Weishaupt	Souvenir	0	8					
5	Germany			8	8	16			15,000 €	4
6	United States	Richard Spooner	Cristallo	eliminated	0					
6	United States	Beezie Madden	Mademoiselle	4	0					
6	United States	Mario Deslauriers	Urico	8	4					
6	United States	McLain Ward	Sapphire	4	4					
6	United States			16	4	20			10,000 €	3
7	Italy	Gianni Govoni	Aboyeur W	0	8					
7	Italy	Giuseppe D'Onofrio	Landzeu	4	4					
7	Italy	Gabriele Grassi	American Blu van Eeklelec	8	4					
7	Italy	Natale Chiaudani	Seldana di Campalto	8	4					
7	Italy			12	12	24			7,000 €	(Note: team are no Official competitor of the 2010 Meydan FEI Nations Cup)
8	Switzerland	Niklaus Schurtenberger	Cantus	0	12					
8	Switzerland	Jane Richard	Zekina Z	8	8					
8	Switzerland	Janika Sprunger	Uptown Boy	4	8					
8	Switzerland	Pius Schwizer	Ulysse X	4	4					
8	Switzerland			8	20	28			5,000 €	2
9	Sweden	Jens Fredricson	Lunatic	4	4					
9	Sweden	Malin Baryard-Johnsson	Actrice W	8	8					
9	Sweden	Daniel Zetterman	Glory Days	0	12					
9	Sweden	Helena Lundbäck	Erbblume	4	retired					
9	Sweden			8	24	32			4,000 €	1
10	Netherlands	Eric van der Vleuten	Utascha SFN	0						
10	Netherlands	Leopold van Asten	Santana B	9						
10	Netherlands	Albert Zoer	Uraya	12						
10	Netherlands	Leon Thijssen	Tyson	8						
10	Netherlands			17					-	0
11	Poland	Andrzej Lemanski	Castiglione L	1						
11	Poland	Jan Chrzanowski	Just Cruising	12						
11	Poland	Krzysztof Ludwiczak	Torado	8						
11	Poland	Aleksandra Lusina	Ekwador	12						
11	Poland			21					-	0

(grey penalties points do not count for the team result)

== Grand Prix Loro Piana ==
The Grand Prix was the mayor competition of the Piazza di Siena 2010 horse show. The sponsor of this competition is Loro Piana. It was held at Sunday, May 30, 2010 at 4:00 pm.

The competition was a show jumping competition with two rounds, the height of the fences was up to 1.60 meters. It is endowed with 200,000 €.

	Rider	Horse	Round 1	Round 2		prize money
	Rider	Horse	Penalties	Penalties	Time (s)	prize money
1	(United States) McLain Ward	Sapphire	0	0	41.24	50,000 €
2	(United Kingdom) John Whitaker	Peppermill	0	0	43.92	40,000 €
3	(Brazil) Rodrigo Pessoa	Rebozo	0	0	45.09	30,000 €
4	(Germany) Rebecca Golasch	Lassen Peak	0	0	47.86	20,000 €
5	(Spain) Julio Arias Cueva	Victory Da	1	0	53.60	14,000 €

(Top 5 of 50 Competitors)
