= 2010 Dublin Horse Show =

The 2010 Dublin Horse Show was that year's edition of the Dublin Horse Show, the Irish official show jumping competition at Dublin. It was held as CSIO 5*. The main sponsor was Fáilte Ireland.

The first horse show was held in 1864 in Dublin by the Royal Agricultural Society of Ireland. Since 1868 it is held by the Royal Dublin Society. In 1926 International Competitions were introduced to this horse show for the first time, it was also the first year the Aga Khan Trophy was held.

The 2010 edition of the Fáilte Ireland Dublin Horse Show was held between 4 August 2010 and 8 August 2010.

== FEI Nations Cup of Ireland ==
The 2010 FEI Nations Cup of Ireland was part of the 2010 Dublin Horse Show. It was the eight and the last competition of the 2010 Meydan FEI Nations Cup.

The 2010 FEI Nations Cup of Ireland was held on Friday, 6 August 2010 at 2:55 pm. The competing teams were: France, the United States of America, Germany, Switzerland, the Netherlands, Ireland, Sweden, Great Britain and Spain (the team of Poland did not take part in this competition).

The competition was a show jumping competition with two rounds and optionally one jump-off. The fences were up to 1.60 meters high. Eight of ten (here: eight of nine) teams are allowed to start in the second round.

The competition is endowed with 200,000 €.

	Team	Rider	Horse	Round A	Round B	Total penalties	Jump-off		Prize money	Scoring points
	Team	Rider	Horse	Penalties	Penalties	Total penalties	Penalties	Time (s)	Prize money	Scoring points
1	Netherlands	Eric van der Vleuten	Utascha SFN	0	0					
1	Netherlands	Jur Vrieling	Bubalu	4	0					
1	Netherlands	Harrie Smolders	Walnut de Muze	4	8					
1	Netherlands	Marc Houtzager	Tamino	0	0					
1	Netherlands			4	0	4			64,000 €	10
2	Ireland	Billy Twomey	Tinka's Serenade	0	4					
2	Ireland	Dermott Lennon	Hallmark Elite	12	8					
2	Ireland	Cian O'Connor	K Club Lady	8	0					
2	Ireland	Denis Lynch	Nabab's Son	8	0					
2	Ireland			16	4	20			36,000 €	6.5
2	United States	Beezie Madden	Coral Reef Via Volo	4	0					
2	United States	Cara Raether	Ublesco	4	8					
2	United States	McLain Ward	Rothchild	8	8					
2	United States	Rich Fellers	Flexible	0	4					
2	United States			8	12	20			36,000 €	6.5
4	France	Penelope Leprevost	Mylord Carthago	0	8					
4	France	Michel Robert	Kellkmoi de Pepita	8	4					
4	France	Marie Etter Pellegrin	Admirable	8	0					
4	France	Kevin Staut	Kraque Boom	8	4					
4	France			16	8	24			24,000 €	5
5	Great Britain	Peter Charles	Pom D'Ami	8	12					
5	Great Britain	William Funnell	Billy Congo	12	12					
5	Great Britain	Tina Fletcher	Hello Sailor	4	0					
5	Great Britain	Nick Skelton	Carlo	4	0					
5	Great Britain			16	12	28			16,000 €	4
7	Spain	Rutherford Latham Morehead	Guarana Champeix	8	4					
7	Spain	Pilar Lucrecia Cordon Muro	Herald	8	4					
7	Spain	Fernando Fourcade Lopez	New Remake de Servery	12	4					
7	Spain	Sergio Alvarez Moya	Action-Breaker	4	5					
7	Spain			20	12	32			9,500 €	2.5
7	Sweden	Peder Fredricson	Arctic Aurora Borealis	0	12					
7	Sweden	Alexander Zetterman	Isaac	8	4					
7	Sweden	Daniel Zetterman	Glory Days	0	12					
7	Sweden	Henrik von Eckermann	Paola	4	16					
7	Sweden			4	28	32			9,500 €	2.5
8	Switzerland	Steve Guerdat	Tresor V	16	4					
8	Switzerland	Werner Muff	Kiamon	12	12					
8	Switzerland	Jane Richard	Upanisad di San Patrignano	8	4					
8	Switzerland	Pius Schwizer	Carlina IV	0	12					
8	Switzerland			20	20	40			5,000 €	1
9	Germany	Mario Stevens	Mac Kinley	8						
9	Germany	Jörg Naeve	Calado	8						
9	Germany	Andreas Knippling	Neolisto van het Mierenhof	12						
9	Germany	Philipp Weishaupt	Leoville	13						
9	Germany			28					-	0

(grey penalty points do not count for the team result)

== Land Rover Puissance ==
The Puissance at 2010 Dublin Horse Show was the main show jumping competition on Saturday, 7 August 2010 at the 2010 Dublin Horse Show. It was held at 6:05 pm.

The competition was held as Puissance competition with one round and up to four jump-offs. It was endowed with €36,000, the sponsor of this competition was Land Rover.

	Rider	Horse	Penalties	prize money
1	(Venezuela) Pablo Barrios	Sinatra	4 penalties in 4th jump-off	9,850 €
1	(Republic of Ireland) Cian O'Connor	Noctambule Courcelle	4 penalties in 4th jump-off	9,850 €
3	(Republic of Ireland) Mark O'Sullivan	Milord de Kergane	4 penalties in 3rd jump-off	3,633 €
3	(Republic of Ireland) Neal Fearon	Cinemax	4 penalties in 3rd jump-off	3,633 €
3	(Republic of Ireland) Captain David O'Brien	River Foyle	4 penalties in 3rd jump-off	3,633 €

(Top 5 of 15 Competitors)

== The Longines International Grand Prix of Ireland ==
The International Grand Prix of Ireland, the Show jumping Grand Prix of the 2010 Dublin Horse Show, was the major show jumping competition at this event. The sponsor of this competition was Longines. It was held on Sunday, 8 August 2010 at 3:00 pm. The competition was a show jumping competition with two rounds, the fences were up to 1.60 meters high.

It was endowed with 200,000 €.

	Rider	Horse	Round 1		Round 2		prize money
	Rider	Horse	Penalties	Time (s)	Penalties	Time (s)	prize money
1	(United States) McLain Ward	Antares F	0	-	0	43.45	66,500 €
2	(France) Kevin Staut	Kraque Boom	0	-	0	44.47	42,000 €
3	(Republic of Ireland) Billy Twomey	Je T'Aime Flamenco	0	-	0	44.90	26,000 €
4	(France) Roger Yves Bost	Ideal de la Loge	0	-	0	46.10	20,000 €
5	(United States) Laura Kraut	Cedric	0	-	0	46.30	14,500 €

(Top 5 of 40 Competitors)
