= 2010 Jumping International de France =

The Jumping International de France 2010 was the 2010 edition of Jumping International de France, the French official show jumping horse show, in the Stadium François André in La Baule-Escoublac. It was held as CSIO 5*.

The first horse show were held 1931 in La Baule, since 1960 La Baule is the location of the French official show jumping horse show (CSIO = Concours de Saut International Officiel). This year the 50 year-jubilee as CSIO is celebrated.

The 2010 edition of Jumping International de France was held between May 13, 2010 and May 16, 2010.

== FEI Nations Cup of France ==
The 2010 FEI Nations Cup of France was part of the Jumping International de France 2010. It was the first competition of the 2010 Meydan FEI Nations Cup.

The 2010 FEI Nations Cup of France was held at Friday, May 14, 2010 at 3:25 pm. The competing teams were: France, the United States of America, Germany, Switzerland, the Netherlands, Ireland, Sweden, the United Kingdom, Spain and Poland. It was first time a team of a former Eastern Bloc nation, Poland, competing in a competition of the Meydan FEI Nations Cup (former Samsung Super League).

The competition was a show jumping competition with two rounds and optionally one jump-off. The height of the fences was up to 1.60 meters. Eight of ten teams were allowed to start in the second round.

The competition is endowed with 200,000 €.

	Team	Rider	Horse	Round A	Round B	Total penalties	Jump-off		Prize money	scoring points
	Team	Rider	Horse	Penalties	Penalties	Total penalties	Penalties	Time (s)	Prize money	scoring points
1	France	Penelope Leprevost	Topinambour	4	4					
1	France	Michel Robert	Kellemoi De Pepita	0	0					
1	France	Olivier Guillon	Lord de Theize	0	0					
1	France	Kevin Staut	Kraque Boom	4	0					
1	France			4	0	4			64,000 €	10
2	United States	Richard Spooner	Cristallo	0	0					
2	United States	Hillary Dobbs	Quincy B	5	9					
2	United States	Mario Deslauriers	Urico	0	0					
2	United States	McLain Ward	Sapphire	4	4					
2	United States			4	4	8			40,000 €	7
3	United Kingdom	Michael Whitaker	Amai	0	8					
3	United Kingdom	Scott Brash	Intertoy Z	8	0					
3	United Kingdom	Mark Armstrong	Thesaura	4	13					
3	United Kingdom	Peter Charles	Pom d'Ami	0	0					
3	United Kingdom			4	8	12			28,000 €	5.5
3	Germany	Alois Pollmann-Schweckhorst	Chacco Blue	0	0					
3	Germany	Alexander Hufenstuhl	Lacapo	8	4					
3	Germany	Rebecca Golasch	Lassen Peak	0	4					
3	Germany	Philipp Weishaupt	Souvenir	12	0					
3	Germany			8	4	12			28,000 €	5.5
5	Spain	Pilar Lucrecia Cordon Muro	Herald	0	4					
5	Spain	Julio Arias Cueva	Jarnac	4	0					
5	Spain	Jesus Garmendia Echevarria	Lord du Mont Milon	1	5					
5	Spain	Sergio Alvarez Moya	Madame Pompadour M	4	did not start					
5	Spain			5	9	14			16,000 €	4
6	Ireland	Shane Breen	Carmena Z	0	0					
6	Ireland	Niall Talbot	Tequi D'I CH	8	retired					
6	Ireland	Darragh Kenny	Obelix	8	4					
6	Ireland	Cameron Hanley	Southwind VDL	0	4					
6	Ireland			8	8	16			11,000 €	3
7	Switzerland	Steve Guerdat	Jalisca Solier	4	4					
7	Switzerland	Theo Muff	Acomet	8	4					
7	Switzerland	Werner Muff	Campione CH	0	4					
7	Switzerland	Pius Schwizer	Carlina	4	1					
7	Switzerland			8	9	17			8,000 €	2
8	Sweden	Malin Baryard-Johnsson	Actrice W	4	8					
8	Sweden	Alexander Zetterman	Isaac	13	16					
8	Sweden	Helena Lundbäck	Madick	4	4					
8	Sweden	Svante Johansson	Caramell KS	0	5					
8	Sweden			8	17	25			5,000 €	1
9	Netherlands	Vincent Voorn	Alpapillon Armanie	0						
9	Netherlands	Piet Raijmakers junior	Rascin	8						
9	Netherlands	Harrie Smolders	Walnut de Muze	4						
9	Netherlands	Gerco Schröder	New Orleans	12						
9	Netherlands			12					-	0
10	Poland	Andrzej Lemanski	Bischof L	4						
10	Poland	Aleksandra Lusina	Castello	8						
10	Poland	Jan Chrzanowski	Just Cruising	8						
10	Poland	Tomasz Klein	Camerino	20						
10	Poland			20					-	0

(grey penalties points do not count for the team result)

== Grand Prix Longines de la ville de la Baule ==
The Grand Prix de la ville de la Baule was the mayor competition of the Jumping International de France 2010. It was held at Sunday, May 16, 2010 at 1:40 pm. The competition was a show jumping competition with one round and one jump-off, the height of the fences was up to 1.60 meters.

The main sponsor of the Grand Prix de la ville de la Baule is Longines. The Grand Prix was endowed with 200,000 €.

	Rider	Horse	Round 1		Jump-off		prize money
	Rider	Horse	Penalties	Time (s)	Penalties	Time (s)	prize money
1	(United States) McLain Ward	Sapphire	0	85.38	0	36.00	66,000 €
2	(United States) Mario Deslauriers	Urico	0	87.99	0	36.95	40,000 €
3	(Spain) Jesus Garmendia Echevarria	Lord du Mont Milon	0	89.60	0	39.18	28,000 €
4	(Switzerland) Pius Schwizer	Carlina	0	90.71	0	39.76	20,000 €
5	(France) Stephan Lafouge	Gabelou des Ores	0	88.84	0	40.74	12,000 €

(Top 5 of 50 Competitors)
