= 2010 Falsterbo Horse Show =

Show jumping horse show

The 2010 Falsterbo Horse Show, the official Swedish show jumping horse show, was held between July 8 and July 11 as CSIO 5* and CDI 5*.

The first horse show was held in 1920 in Falsterbo, and in 1969, the first show jumping derby was held here.

== FEI Nations Cup of Sweden ==
The 2010 FEI Nations Cup of Sweden was part of the 2010 Falsterbo Horse Show. It was the fifth competition of the 2010 Meydan FEI Nations Cup.

The 2010 FEI Nations Cup of Sweden was held on Friday, July 9, 2010, at 2:30 pm. The competing teams were: France, the United States of America, Germany, Switzerland, the Netherlands, Ireland, Sweden, Great Britain, Spain and Poland.

The competition was a show jumping competition with two rounds and optionally one jump-off. The height of the fences was up to 1.60 meters. Eight of ten teams were allowed to start in the second round.

The competition was endowed with 200,000 €.

	Team	Rider	Horse	Round A	Round B	Total penalties	Jump-off		Prize money	Scoring points
	Team	Rider	Horse	Penalties	Penalties	Total penalties	Penalties	Time (s)	Prize money	Scoring points
1	Sweden	Malin Baryard-Johnsson	Tornesch	4	4					
1	Sweden	Helena Lundbäck	Erbblume	0	4					
1	Sweden	Peder Fredricson	Arctic Aurora Borealis	0	4					
1	Sweden	Rolf-Göran Bengtsson	Casall	0	1					
1	Sweden			0	9	9			64,000 €	10
2	Netherlands	Eric van der Vleuten	Utascha SFN	4	0					
2	Netherlands	Jur Vrieling	Bubalou	0	4					
2	Netherlands	Leopold van Asten	Santana B	4	0					
2	Netherlands	Marc Houtzager	Tamino	4	4					
2	Netherlands			8	4	12			40,000 €	7
3	Spain	Rutherford Latham	Guarana Champeix	4	0					
3	Spain	Manuel Añon Suarez	Loreal D'Utah	1	13					
3	Spain	Fernando Fourcade	New Remake de Servery	4	0					
3	Spain	Ricardo Jurado	Julia des Brumes	12	12					
3	Spain			9	12	21			28,000 €	5.5
3	France	Eric Navet	Kiwi du Fraigneau	15	9					
3	France	Nicolas Delmotte	Luccianno	4	16					
3	France	Marie Etter Pellegrin	Admirable	0	4					
3	France	Kevin Staut	Silvana	0	4					
3	France			4	17	21			28,000 €	5.5
5	Ireland	Dermott Lennon	Hallmark Elite	4	12					
5	Ireland	Jessica Kürten	Myrtille Paulois	8	12					
5	Ireland	Shane Breen	Carmena Z	4	4					
5	Ireland	Denis Lynch	Nabab's Son	0	0					
5	Ireland			8	16	24			13,500 €	3.5
5	United States	Todd Minikus	Pavarotti	4	8					
5	United States	Cara Raether	Ublesco	0	8					
5	United States	McLain Ward	Rothchild	0	4					
5	United States	Rich Fellers	Flexible	8	8					
5	United States			4	20	24			13,500 €	3.5
7	(United Kingdom) Great Britain	William Funnell	Billy Congo	4	8					
7	(United Kingdom) Great Britain	Mark Armstrong	Thesaura	16	8					
7	(United Kingdom) Great Britain	Tina Fletcher	Hello Sailor	0	1					
7	(United Kingdom) Great Britain	Tim Stockdale	Kalico Bay	4	8					
7	(United Kingdom) Great Britain			8	17	25			8,000 €	2
8	Switzerland	Arthur da Silva	La Toya III	16	8					
8	Switzerland	Claudia Gisler	Touchable	8	12					
8	Switzerland	Janika Sprunger	Uptown Boy	4	8					
8	Switzerland	Pius Schwizer	Ulysse	0	0					
8	Switzerland			12	16	28			5,000 €	1
9	Germany	Alois Pollmann-Schweckhorst	Chacco-Blue	8						
9	Germany	Jörg Naeve	Calado	4						
9	Germany	Philipp Weishaupt	Catoki	0						
9	Germany	Marcus Ehning	Küchengirl	16						
9	Germany			12					-	0
10	Poland	Piotr Sawicki	Caballus Z	2						
10	Poland	Jacek Bobik	Taunus	eliminated						
10	Poland	Dawid Kubiak	Limbo	did not start						
10	Poland			eliminated					-	0

(grey penalties points do not count for the team result)

== Grand Prix Spécial (B-Final) ==
The 2010 Falsterbo Horse Show was the venue of the second competition of the World Dressage Masters (WDM) - rider ranking, season 2010/2011.

All competitors starts first in the Grand Prix de Dressage at Thursday. The eight best-placed competitors of the Grand Prix de Dressage are allowed to start in the A-Final (the Grand Prix Freestyle). It some of best-placed competitors want to start in the B-Final, the same number of competitors, who are placed after the best-placed competitors, move up in the A-Final.

The B-Final of the World Dressage Masters competitions at 2010 Falsterbo Horse Show was held on July 9, 2010 at 2:00 pm. It was endowed with 30,000 €. The B-Final was held as Grand Prix Spécial, the competition with the highest definite level of dressage competitions.

	Rider	Horse	Score
1	(Germany) Jonny Hilberath	Amüsant	69.292 %
2	(Netherlands) Christa Laarakkers	Ovation	67.250 %
3	(Sweden) Charlotte Haid Bondergaard	Lydianus	66.292 %

(top 3 of 6 competitors)

== Grand Prix Freestyle (A-Final) ==
The Grand Prix Freestyle (or Grand Prix Kür) was the A-Final of the World Dressage Masters competitions at 2010 Falsterbo Horse Show (see also Grand Prix Spécial).

A Grand Prix Freestyle was a Freestyle dressage competition. The level of this competition is at least the level of a Grand Prix de Dressage, but it can be higher than the level of a Grand Prix Spécial.

The Grand Prix Freestyle at the 2010 Falsterbo Horse Show was held at Saturday, July 10, 2010 at 1:00 pm. It was endowed with 60,000 €.

	Rider	Horse	Score
1	(Netherlands) Anky van Grunsven	Painted Black	82.400 %
2	(Germany) Ulla Salzgeber	Wakana	75.900 %
3	(Sweden) Tinne Vilhelmson-Silfven	Favourit	75.400 %
4	(Germany) Anja Plönzke	Le Mont d'Or	73.850 %
5	(Netherlands) Aat van Essen	Premier	71.450 %

(top 5 of 8 competitors)

== JMS Falsterbo Derby ==
The Falsterbo Derby was an important show jumping competition at the 2010 Falsterbo Horse Show. The sponsor of this competition was JMS. A Derby was a show jumping competition with special fences like walls or natural fences build of wood (an other example of a derby competition in show jumping is the British Jumping Derby).

This competition was held at Saturday, July 10, 2010 at 3:45 pm. The competition was a show jumping competition with one round and one jump-off.

	Rider	Horse	Round 1		jump-off		prize money
	Rider	Horse	Penalties	Time (s)	Penalties	Time (s)	prize money
1	(United Kingdom) William Funnell	Kanelle de la Baie	0	-	0	51.61	13,000 €
2	(Germany) Jörg Naeve	Coolidge	0	-	0	53.68	9,000 €
3	(Republic of Ireland) Shane Breen	Dorada	4	156.45			6,000 €
4	(Netherlands) Leopold van Asten	Issis du Marais	4	165.62			4,000 €
5	(Netherlands) Eric van der Vleuten	Cannelina	4	165.83			3,000 €

(Top 5 of 23 Competitors)

== Longines Falsterbo Grand Prix ==
The Grand Prix was the mayor show jumping competition of the 2010 Falsterbo Horse Show. The sponsor of this competition was Longines. It was held at Sunday, July 11, 2010 at 3:00 pm. The competition was a show jumping competition with two rounds, the height of the fences were up to 1.60 meters.

	Rider	Horse	Round 1	jump-off		prize money
	Rider	Horse	Penalties	Penalties	Time (s)	prize money
1	(Sweden) Rolf-Göran Bengtsson	Casall	0	0	48.51	64,000 €
2	(Sweden) Malin Baryard-Johnsson	Tornesch	0	0	48.89	40,000 €
3	(Germany) Alois Pollmann-Schweckhorst	Chacco-Blue	0	0	50.23	32,000 €
4	(France) Marie Etter Pellegrin	Admirable	0	0	50.85	21,000 €
5	(France) Stephan Lafouge	Gabelou des Ores	0	0	51.46	14,000 €

(Top 5 of 44 Competitors)
