= 2011 Global Champions Tour =

The 2011 Global Champions Tour was the sixth staging of the Global Champions Tour (GCT), an international competition series on equestrian show jumping. The series was held mainly in Europe but three competitions were held outside of Europe. All competitions were endowed with at least €285,000 in prize money. All GCT events were held as CSI 5*.

The competitions were held between March 17, 2011 and November 12, 2011. There was no final round; at the end of the season, the best 18 show jumping horseback riders in the final overall standings received bonus prize money.

== Competitions ==
All competitions were held over two rounds against the clock including one jump-off - a final round in the event of a tie - against the clock.

=== 1st Competition: Global Champions Tour of Qatar ===
March 17, 2011 to March 19, 2011 – Qatar Racing & Equestrian Club, Doha, Qatar
Competition: Saturday, March 19, 2011 – Start: 6:45 pm, prize money: € 475,000

	Rider	Horse	Round 1		Round 2		Jump-off		scoring points
	Rider	Horse	Penalties	Time (s)	Penalties	Time (s)	Penalties	Time (s)	scoring points
1	(Brazil) Álvaro Affonso de Miranda Neto	Ashleigh Drossel Dan	0	-	0	-	0	42.53	40
2	(Switzerland) Pius Schwizer	Carlina	0	-	0	-	4	43.35	37
3	(Germany) Meredith Michaels-Beerbaum	Shutterfly	0	-	0	-	4	45.13	35

(Top 3 of 47 competitors)

=== 2nd Competition: Global Champions Tour of Spain ===
May 6, 2011 to May 8, 2011 – Museo de las Ciencias Príncipe Felipe, Ciutat de les Arts i les Ciències, Valencia, Spain
Competition: Saturday, May 7, 2011 – Start: 5:00 pm, prize money: € 285,000

	Rider	Horse	Round 1		Round 2		Jump-off		scoring points
	Rider	Horse	Penalties	Time (s)	Penalties	Time (s)	Penalties	Time (s)	scoring points
1	(Republic of Ireland) Billy Twomey	Je t'aime Flamenco	0	-	0	-	0	39.18	40
2	(Germany) Ludger Beerbaum	Gotha FRH	0	-	0	-	0	40.04	37
3	(Netherlands) Maikel van der Vleuten	Verdi	0	-	0	-	0	45.99	35

(Top 3 of 49 competitors)

=== 3rd Competition: Global Champions Tour of Germany ===
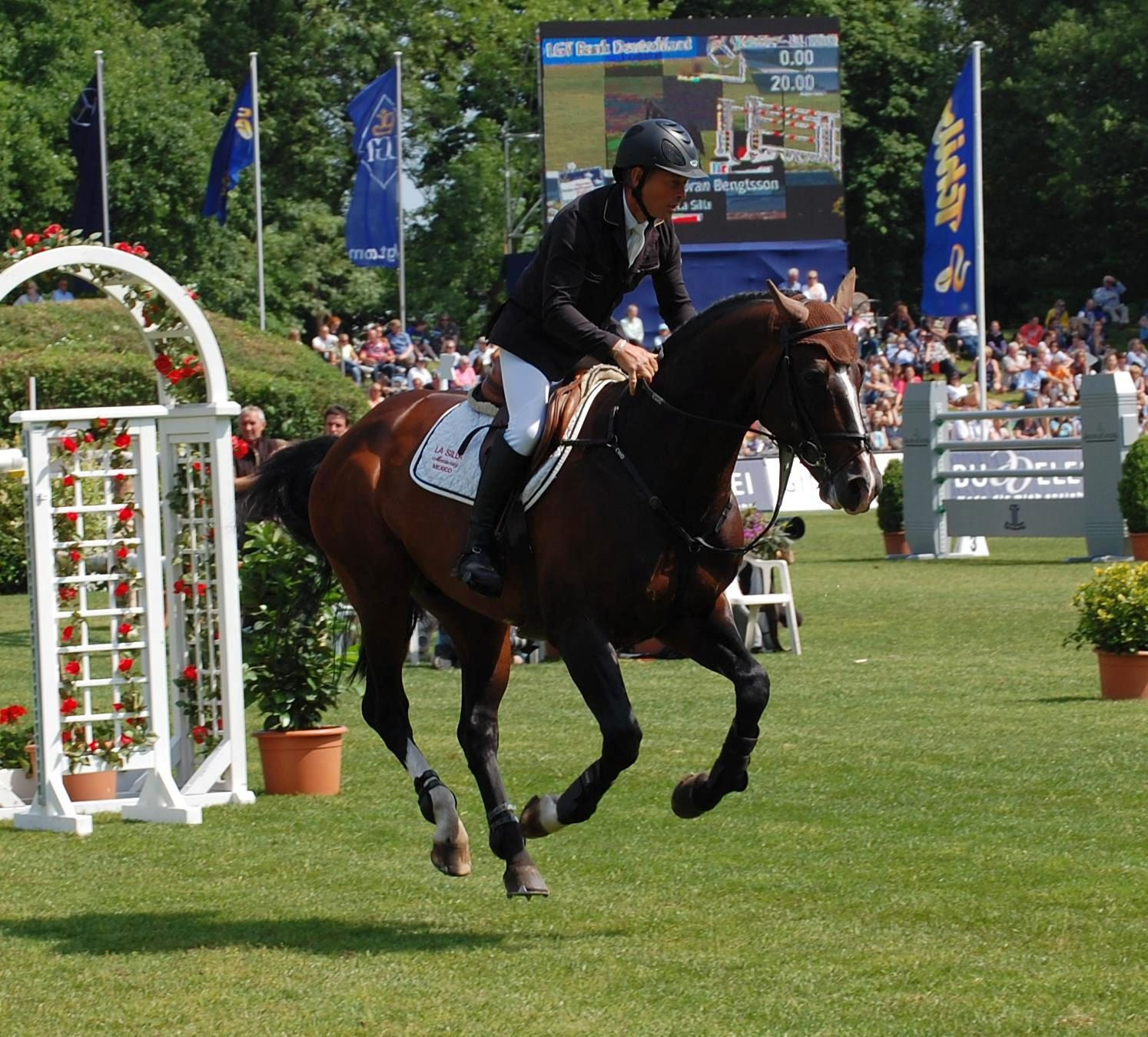
Rolf-Göran Bengtsson and Casall at the qualifier competition to the 2011 Global Champions Tour of Germany

June 2, 2011 to June 5, 2011 – Hamburg (German show jumping and dressage derby), Germany
Competition: Saturday, June 4, 2011 – Start: 1:40 pm, prize money: € 285,000

	Rider	Horse	Round 1		Round 2		Jump-off		scoring points
	Rider	Horse	Penalties	Time (s)	Penalties	Time (s)	Penalties	Time (s)	scoring points
1	(Sweden) Rolf-Göran Bengtsson	Casall	0	-	0	-	0	46.97	40
2	(Germany) Ludger Beerbaum	Chaman	0	-	0	-	0	47.93	37
3	(Germany) Janne Friederike Meyer	Lambrasco	0	-	0	-	retired		35

(Top 3 of 49 competitors)

=== 4th Competition: France I ===
June 9, 2011 to June 11, 2011 – Cannes, France
Competition: Saturday, June 11, 2011 – Start: 6:00 pm, prize money: € 285,000

	Rider	Horse	Round 1		Round 2		Jump-off		scoring points
	Rider	Horse	Penalties	Time (s)	Penalties	Time (s)	Penalties	Time (s)	scoring points
1	(Australia) Edwina Alexander	Itot du Château	0	-	0	-	0	39.30	40
2	(Spain) Sergio Alvarez Moya	Action-Breaker	0	-	0	-	0	42.37	37
3	(Germany) Ludger Beerbaum	Gotha FRH	0	-	0	-	0	43.23	35

(Top 3 of 47 competitors)

=== 5th Competition: Global Champions Tour of Monaco ===
June 23, 2011 to June 25, 2011 – shore at the marina „Port Hercule“, Monte Carlo, Monaco
Competition: Saturday, June 25, 2011 – Start: 6:00 pm, prize money: € 285,000

Frank Rothenberger designed the fourth course competition in the 2011 season. The Monaco horse show was held on a provisional sand jumping arena at the shore of the Boulevard Albert 1er.

In the first round of the competition, 12 riders had faultless rides. The second round was much more difficult: only three riders and their horses cleared this round. Only Rolf-Göran Bengtsson cleared in both round, so he won the competition without a jump-off.

Charlotte Casiraghi served as the honorary president of the Monaco horse show. Albert II, Prince of Monaco, gave out awards and congratulated the winner at the prize ceremony of the Global Champions Tour.

	Rider	Horse	Round 1		Round 2		Jump-off		scoring points
	Rider	Horse	Penalties	Time (s)	Penalties	Time (s)	Penalties	Time (s)	scoring points
1	(Sweden) Rolf-Göran Bengtsson	Casall	0	-	0	59.79			40
2	(Germany) Christian Ahlmann	Taloubet Z	0	-	1	60.95			37
3	(Brazil) Rodrigo Pessoa	Let's Fly	4	-	0	54.14			35

(Top 3 of 47 competitors)

=== 6th Competition: Global Champions Tour of Portugal ===
June 30, 2011 to July 2, 2011 – Hipódromo Manuel Possolo, Cascais near Estoril, Portugal
Competition: Saturday, July 2, 2011

Frank Rothenberger was again the course designer of the competition. In the first round, nine riders had no-fault rides. In the second round, more than the half of the contestants ha no-faults. In total six riders are faultless in both rounds – they qualified for the jump-off.

In the jump-off, half of the six riders had no faults, Christian Ahlmann won the competition. The second round and the jump-off were held under floodlight.

	Rider	Horse	Round 1		Round 2		Jump-off		scoring points
	Rider	Horse	Penalties	Time (s)	Penalties	Time (s)	Penalties	Time (s)	scoring points
1	(Germany) Christian Ahlmann	Taloubet Z	0	-	0	-	0	45.21	40
2	(Portugal) Luciana Diniz	Winningmood	0	-	0	-	0	47.32	37
3	(Germany) Ludger Beerbaum	Chaman	0	-	0	-	0	48.85	35

(Top 3 of 45 competitors)

=== 7th Competition: France II ===
July 22, 2011 to July 24, 2011 – Chantilly Racecourse, Chantilly, France
Competition: Saturday, July 23, 2011 at 3:30 pm

Course designer at the GCT Grand Prix of Chantilly was Uliano Vezzani from Italy. Six riders with their horses had not faults in the first round. Also four riders had only time faults in this round. In the second round of the Grand Prix nine rider had not faults. In total three riders are faultless in both rounds – they was qualified for the jump-off.

	Rider	Horse	Round 1		Round 2		Jump-off		scoring points
	Rider	Horse	Penalties	Time (s)	Penalties	Time (s)	Penalties	Time (s)	scoring points
1	(Australia) Edwina Alexander	Itot du Château	0	-	0	-	0	41.88	40
2	(Portugal) Luciana Diniz	Lennox	0	-	0	-	0	41.91	37
3	(France) Pénélope Leprevost	Mylord Carthago	0	-	0	-	0	44.16	35

(Top 3 of 46 competitors)

=== 8th Competition: Global Champions Tour of the Netherlands ===
August 12, 2011 to August 14, 2011 – Valkenswaard, Netherlands
Competition: Saturday, August 13, 2011

Second time in this GCT season Uliano Vezzani was the course designer of a GCT Grand Prix. In the first round of this Grand Prix twelve riders had no penalty points. In the second round six riders with their horses had not faults. In total four riders are faultless in both rounds. This riders were qualified for the jump-off. Winner of the competition was US-American rider Beezie Madden.

	Rider	Horse	Round 1		Round 2		Jump-off		scoring points
	Rider	Horse	Penalties	Time (s)	Penalties	Time (s)	Penalties	Time (s)	scoring points
1	(United States) Beezie Madden	Cortes'C'	0	-	0	-	0	38.38	40
2	(Republic of Ireland) Denis Lynch	Lantinus	0	-	0	-	0	38.92	37
3	(Netherlands) Jur Vrieling	Bubalu	0	-	0	-	4	39.52	35

(Top 3 of 49 competitors)

=== 9th Competition: Global Champions Tour of Brazil ===
September 2, 2011 to September 4, 2011 – equestrian facility of the Sociedade Hípica Brasileira, Rio de Janeiro (Athina Onassis International Horse Show), Brazil
Competition: Saturday, September 4, 2011 – Start: 4:00 pm

The Grand Prix of Rio de Janeiro is with a prize money of €1,000,000 the highest endowed show jumping Grand Prix in 2011 – in front of the Grand Prix of Calgary (with a purse of Can$1,000,000) and the Grand Prix of Saugerties (US$1,000,000 prize money). Course designer of this competition is Luc Musette from Belgium.

According to the prize money the course was built very sophisticated. In round one only two riders had no faults, five riders had retired in the show-jumping course. The second round was easier for the riders, ten of 18 riders with their horses had no faults. The only rider with a double clear round was Gerco Schröder with the Belgian stallion London, so a jump-off was not necessary.

	Rider	Horse	Round 1		Round 2		Jump-off		scoring points
	Rider	Horse	Penalties	Time (s)	Penalties	Time (s)	Penalties	Time (s)	scoring points
1	(Netherlands) Gerco Schröder	London	0	-	0	72.02			40
2	(Australia) Edwina Alexander	Itot du Château	4	-	0	64.87			37
3	(Germany) Philipp Weishaupt	Monte Bellini	4	-	0	66.68			35

(Top 3 of 38 competitors)

=== 10th Competition: Global Champions Tour of the United Arab Emirates ===
November 24, 2011 to November 26, 2011 – Al-Forsan International Sports Resort, Abu Dhabi, United Arab Emirates
Competition: Saturday, November 26, 2011 – Start: 3:45 pm

First time ever a Global Champions Tour competition was held in the United Arab Emirates. The show jumping course was built again by Italian Uliano Vezzani. The competition had a purse of € 400,000.

In the first round 13 riders had no faults, three other riders had only time faults. Ludger Beerbaum, who had ridden Chaman, had big problems in a triple combination and retired after eight penalties. After this ride it was clear that Edwina Tops-Alexander had won the 2011 Global Champions Tour ranking. But also Tops-Alexander had eight penalties, so she was not qualified for the second round of this competition.

In the second round eleven of eighteen riders with their horses had no faults. Eight riders in total was clear in both rounds, they was qualified for the jump-off. The winner of the competition was French rider Roger-Yves Bost, who used as only rider of the jump-off a shortcut, so he had the fastest time in the jump-off.

	Rider	Horse	Round 1		Round 2		Jump-off		scoring points
	Rider	Horse	Penalties	Time (s)	Penalties	Time (s)	Penalties	Time (s)	scoring points
1	(France) Roger-Yves Bost	Ideal de la Loge	0	-	0	-	0	41.14	40
2	(Saudi Arabia) Khaled Al-Eid	Presley Boy	0	-	0	-	0	42.08	37
3	(Brazil) Álvaro de Miranda Neto	Ashleigh Drossel Dan	0	-	0	-	0	42.20	35

(Top 3 of 38 competitors)

== Final standings ==
	Rider	1st Competition	2nd Competition	3rd Competition	4th Competition	5th Competition	6th Competition	7th Competition	8th Competition	9th Competition	10th Competition	Total scoring points	prize money (bonus)
1	(Australia) Edwina Tops-Alexander	28	(27)	30	40	30	(0)	40	33	37	(0)	238	€ 300,000
2	(Germany) Ludger Beerbaum	19.5	37	37	35	23	35	(0)	(0)	32	(0)	218.5	€ 180,000
3	(Brazil) Álvaro de Miranda Neto	40	26	32	(19)	(6)	(0)	21	29	27	35	210	€ 120,000
4	(Sweden) Rolf-Göran Bengtsson	(0)	20	40	12	40	30	(0)	(0)	30	33	205	€ 80,000
5	(Portugal) Luciana Diniz	33	(0)	20	30	29	37	37	(6)	(0)	12	198	€ 60,000
6	(Republic of Ireland) Denis Lynch	32	32	24	32	0	21	(0)	37	—	19	197	€ 33,750
7	(Germany) Philipp Weishaupt	27	—	8	29	26	26	(0)	20	35	(8)	171	€ 33,750
8	(Switzerland) Clarissa Crotta	—	—	—	33	24	32	25	22	—	31	167	€ 20,000
9	(Germany) Marco Kutscher	(0)	(8)	31	(8)	11	31	31	30	8	22	164	€ 20,000
10	(Germany) Christian Ahlmann	(8)	10	11	(6)	37	40	23	28	—	11	160	€ 20,000
11	(Switzerland) Pius Schwizer	37	—	—	24	31	27	—	0	26	10	155	€ 20,000
12	(Republic of Ireland) Billy Twomey	11	40	21	11	19	22	—	(7)	—	24	148	€ 10,000
13	(Belgium) Judy-Ann Melchior	0	(0)	33	22	22	—	10	(0)	31	28	146	€ 10,000
14	(France) Kevin Staut	25	19	—	26	25	25	(0)	11	12	(0)	143	€ 10,000
15	(Brazil) Rodrigo Pessoa	—	21	—	10	35	8	29	0	33	—	136	€ 10,000
16	(Netherlands) Gerco Schröder	30	25	28	0	0	—	0	(0)	40	(0)	123	€ 7,500
17	(United States) Laura Kraut	—	33	9	(0)	0	—	33	12	25	6	118	€ 7,500
18	(Germany) Marcus Ehning	—	31	0	21	32	0	0	32	(0)	—	116	€ 7,500

Seven results count for the final standing.
