= 2010 CHIO Aachen =

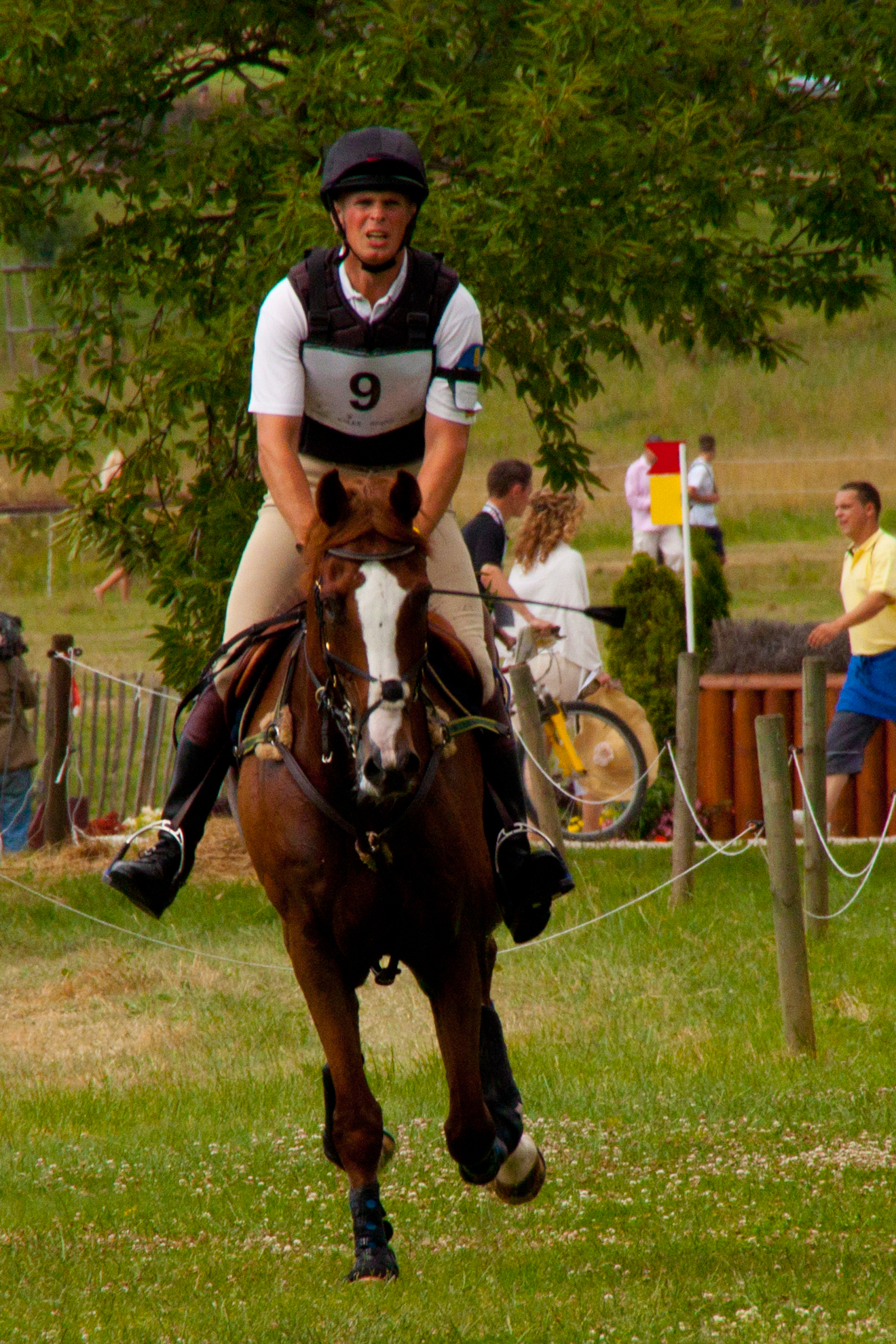
Eventing at the 2010 CHIO Aachen

The 2010 CHIO Aachen was the 2010 edition of the CHIO Aachen, the German official horse show in five horse sport disciplines (show jumping, dressage, eventing, four-in-hand-driving and vaulting).

The CHIO Aachen is in show jumping and dressage the most prestigious horse show in Europe. It is also called "Weltfest der Pferdesports" (World Equestrian Festival).

The competitions are held at different places in Aachen. The show jumping competitions are held in the "Hauptstadion" of the CHIO Aachen, the dressage event are held in the "Deutsche Bank Stadion" and the vaulting competitions are held in the "Albert-Vahle-Halle", all in Aachen.

The 2010 CHIO Aachen was held as CSIO 5* (show jumping), CDIO 5* (dressage), CICO 3* (eventing), CAIO (four-in-hand-driving) and CVIO 2* (vaulting). It was held between July 9, 2010 and July 11, 2010 (vaulting) and between July 13, 2010 and July 18, 2010 (other disciplines).

The first horse show were held 1924 in Aachen, together with a horse race. In 1927 the horse show lasted six days. The first show jumping nations cup was held here in 1929. Since 2007, influenced by the World Equestrian Games 2006 in Aachen, also eventing and vaulting are disciplines of the CHIO Aachen. In 2010 the 79th time a horse show is held in the Soers in Aachen.

== Nations Cup of Germany (vaulting) ==
The 2010 vaulting Nations Cup of Germany was part of the 2010 CHIO Aachen. It was a combined competition of three Freestyle vaulting competitions (single vaulting - Men, single vaulting - Women and team vaulting. Unlike the other disciplines nations can start with more than one team.

	Team	Vaulter	Group	Longeur	Horse	result
1	France	Anne-Sophie Musset-Agnus		Danièle Agnus	Kilkady D' Heurteloup	8.200
1	France	Nicolas Andreani		Marine Joosten Dupon	Idefix de Braize	8.727
1	France		Team "France"	Fabrice Holzberger	Wattriano R	8.557
1	France					25.484
2	Germany I	Kai Vorberg		Kirsten Graf	Sir Bernhard RS v. d. Wintermühle	8.587
2	Germany I	Simone Wiegele		Jessica Schmitz	Arkansas	8.607
2	Germany I		Bleyer Rheinland (Team Wintermühle Köln and RSV Neuss Grimlinghausen)	Alexandra Knauf	Weltoni RS v. d. Wintermühle	8.281
2	Germany I					25.475
3	Germany II	Gero Meyer		Silke Bartel	Centuro	8.353
3	Germany II	Sarah Kay		Irina Lenkeit	Airbus	8.340
3	Germany II		PSG Rittergut Habighorst-Bordenau	Lars Hansen	Bobby	8.136
3	Germany II					24.829
4	Switzerland I	Simone Jäiser		Rita Blieske	Luk	7.707
4	Switzerland I	Patric Looser		Alexandra Knauf	Record RS v. d. Wintermühle	8.673
4	Switzerland I		Team "Lütisburg I"	Monika Bischofberger	Will be Good	8.055
4	Switzerland I					24.435

[Top 4 of 8 teams]

== FEI Nations Cup of Germany (show jumping) ==
The 2010 FEI Nations Cup of Germany (show jumping) was part of the 2010 CHIO Aachen. It was the sixth competition of the 2010 Meydan FEI Nations Cup.

The 2010 FEI Nations Cup of Germany was held at Thursday, July 15, 2010 at 7:30 pm (second round under floodlight). The competing teams were: France, the United States of America, Germany, Switzerland, the Netherlands, Ireland, Sweden, Great Britain, Spain and Poland.

The competition was a show jumping competition with two rounds and optionally one jump-off. The height of the fences were up to 1.60 meters. Eight of ten teams were allowed to start in the second round.

The competition was endowed with 200,000 €. Mercedes-Benz was the sponsor of this competition.

	Team	Rider	Horse	Round A	Round B	Total penalties	Jump-off		Prize money	Scoring points
	Team	Rider	Horse	Penalties	Penalties	Total penalties	Penalties	Time (s)	Prize money	Scoring points
1	Ireland	Billy Twomey	Tinka's Serenade	4	0					
1	Ireland	Dermott Lennon	Hallmark Elite	0	0					
1	Ireland	Cian O'Connor	K Club Lady	0	0					
1	Ireland	Denis Lynch	Lantinus	4	did not start					
1	Ireland			4	0	4			64,000 €	10
2	Germany	Marco Kutscher	Cash	0	4					
2	Germany	Janne Friederike Meyer	Lambrasco	4	1					
2	Germany	Ludger Beerbaum	Gotha	18	0					
2	Germany	Marcus Ehning	Plot Blue	0	did not start					
2	Germany			4	5	9			40,000 €	7
3	United States	Lauren Hough	Quick Study	0	4					
3	United States	Candice King	Skara Glen's Davos	0	4					
3	United States	Nicole Shahinian Simpson	Tristan	4	0					
3	United States	Laura Kraut	Cedric	4	4					
3	United States			4	8	12			32,000 €	6
4	Switzerland	Steve Guerdat	Jalisca Solier	8	12					
4	Switzerland	Niklaus Schurtenberger	Cantus	4	4					
4	Switzerland	Werner Muff	Campione	0	4					
4	Switzerland	Pius Schwizer	Carlina K	0	4					
4	Switzerland			4	12	16			20,000 €	4.5
4	France	Pénélope Leprevost	Mylord Carthago	0	0					
4	France	Michel Robert	Kellemoi de Pepita	13	13					
4	France	Olivier Guillon	Lord de Theize	4	8					
4	France	Kevin Staut	Kraque Boom	0	4					
4	France			4	12	16			20,000 €	4.5
6	Netherlands	Vincent Voorn	Alpapillon-Armanie	12	8					
6	Netherlands	Gerco Schröder	New Orleans	7	0					
6	Netherlands	Harrie Smolders	Walnut de Muze	4	8					
6	Netherlands	Marc Houtzager	Opium VS	0	5					
6	Netherlands			11	13	24			11,000 €	3
7	Sweden	Malin Baryard-Johnsson	Actrice W	4	8					
7	Sweden	Svante Johansson	Caramell KS	4	9					
7	Sweden	Henrik von Eckermann	Frodo	8	5					
7	Sweden	Rolf-Göran Bengtsson	Quintero La Silla	1	9					
7	Sweden			9	22	31			8,000 €	2
8	United Kingdom	Peter Charles	Pom d'Ami	4	5					
8	United Kingdom	David McPherson	Chamberlain Z	4	17					
8	United Kingdom	Scott Brash	Intertoy Z	25	4					
8	United Kingdom	John Whitaker	Peppermill	1	did not start					
8	United Kingdom			9	26	35			5,000 €	1
9	Poland	Andrzej Lemanski	Bischof L	4						
9	Poland	Krzyszlof Ludwiczak	Torado	12						
9	Poland	Antoni Tomaszewski	Trojka	8						
9	Poland	Jaroslaw Skrzyczynski	Coriana	5						
9	Poland			17					-	0
10	Spain	Julio Arias Cueva	Victory v. Hazelarenhoekj	did not start						
10	Spain	Pilar Lucrecia Cordon Muro	Herald	4						
10	Spain	Jesus Garmendia Echevarria	Lord du Mont Milon	9						
10	Spain	Sergio Alvarez Moya	Mme Pompadour M	5						
10	Spain			18					-	0

(grey penalties points do not count for the team result)

== CICO 3* ==
The CICO 3*, was the official eventing competition of Germany. It was held as two-day-event. The first part of this competition, the dressage phase, was held at Friday, July 16, 2010 at 8:30 am. The second phase, the show jumping phase, was held at Friday, July 16, 2010 at 5:30 pm. The final phase, the cross country phase, was held at Saturday, July 17, 2010 at 10:30 am.

The sponsor of this competition was the DHL.

=== team result ===
	Team	Rider	Horse	Converted dressage score	Show jumping score	Cross country score	Total score
1	Germany	Michael Jung	River of Joy	38.20	8.00	27.60	73.80
1	Germany	Ingrid Klimke	FRH Butts Abraxxas	40.60	8.00	1.60	50.20
1	Germany	Andreas Dibowski	Butts Leon	41.20	4.00	2.40	47.60
1	Germany	Dirk Schrade	King Artus	44.60	withdrawn	withdrawn	withdrawn
1	Germany						171.60
2	Sweden	Linda Algotsson	Stand By Me	43.60	4.00	4.80	52.40
2	Sweden	Niklas Jonsson	First Lady	45.40	12.00	15.20	72.60
2	Sweden	Katrin Norling	Pandora Emm	45.80	4.00	4.40	54.20
2	Sweden	Malin Larsson	Piccadilly Z	52.60	4.00	22.80	79.40
2	Sweden						179.20
3	(United Kingdom) Great Britain	Emily Baldwin	Drivetime	39.20	1.00	8.80	49.00
3	(United Kingdom) Great Britain	Ruth Edge	Carnaval Prince II	44.60	4.00	5.60	54.20
3	(United Kingdom) Great Britain	Pippa Funnell	Mirage d'Elle	51.20	8.00	38.80	98.00
3	(United Kingdom) Great Britain	Nicola Wilson	Bee Diplomatic	63.20	19.00	12.80	87.00
3	(United Kingdom) Great Britain						190.20
4	New Zealand	Andrew Nicholson	Nereo	44.80	2.00	0.00	46.80
4	New Zealand	Mark Todd	Chuckelberry	47.80	4.00	42.00	93.80
4	New Zealand	Jonathan Paget	Clifton Promise	51.20	0.00	28.40	79.60
4	New Zealand	Joe Meyer	Sanskrit	54.60	7.00	31.20	92.80
4	New Zealand						219.20
5	Belgium	Karin Donckers	Gazelle de la Brasserie CH	39.40	8.00	6.40	53.80
5	Belgium	Joris Vanspringel	Limestone	47.20	1.00	eliminated	eliminated
5	Belgium	Virginie Caulier	Nepal du Sudre	49.80	4.00	20.40	74.20
5	Belgium	Lara de Liedekerke	Nooney Blue	53.60	4.00	35.20	92.80
5	Belgium						220.80
6	Italy	Stefano Brecciaroli	Apollo van de Wendi Kurt Hoeve	42.00	4.00	8.40	54.40
6	Italy	Susanna Bordone	Blue Moss	48.20	0.00	62.80	111.00
6	Italy	Marco Cappai	Dourango	51.80	31.00	18.40	101,20
6	Italy	Gianluca Gardini	Lion Dancer	60.40	9.00	11.20	80.60
6	Italy						236.20
7	France	Stanislas de Zuchowicz	Quirinal de la Bastide	49.80	5.00	88.00	142.80
7	France	Jean-Lou Bigot	Lotus de Gobaude	51.00	3.00	eliminated	eliminated
7	France	Cédric Lyard	Narcos de Soulac	55.60	4.00	43.60	103.20
7	France	Lionel Guyon	Metisse de Lalou	56.00	4.00		67.60
7	France						313.60

(grey penalties points do not count for the team result)

=== Individual result ===
	Rider	Horse	Converted dressage score	Show jumping score	Cross country score	Total score
1	(New Zealand) Andrew Nicholson	Nereo	44.80	2.00	0.00	46.80
2	(Germany) Andreas Dibowski	Butts Leon	41.20	4.00	2.40	47.60
3	(Germany) Dirk Schrade	Gadget de la Cere	40.20	8.00	0.00	48.20
4	(Germany) Michael Jung	Leopin	44.20	4.00	0.00	48.20
5	(United Kingdom) Emily Baldwin	Drivetime	39.20	1.00	8.80	49.00

(Top 5 of 41 Competitors)

== Grand Prix Spécial ==
The Grand Prix Spécial was one of the most important dressage competitions at the 2010 CHIO Aachen. A Grand Prix Spécial is the competition with the highest definite level of dressage competitions.

It was held at Saturday, July 17, 2010 at 9:00 am. The Meggle AG was the sponsor of this competition.

	Rider	Horse	Score	prize money (€)
1	(Netherlands) Edward Gal	Moorlands Totilas	86.458%	8,600 €
2	(Netherlands) Adelinde Cornelissen	Parzival	82.542%	5,200 €
3	(United Kingdom) Laura Bechtolsheimer	Mistral Hojris	79.375%	3,900 €
4	(Germany) Isabell Werth	Satchmo	76.417%	2,600 €
5	(Austria) Victoria Max-Theurer	Augustin OLD	74.458%	1,800 €

(top 5 of 30 competitors)

== Nations Cup of Germany (dressage) ==
The 2010 dressage Nations Cup of Germany was part of the 2010 CHIO Aachen. The result of the dressage Nations Cup was an addition of the result of the Grand Prix de Dressage and the Grand Prix Spécial of four team riders per team.

The sponsor of this competition was the Lambertz-Group.

	Team	Rider	Horse	Grand Prix de Dressage score	Grand Prix Spécial score	Total score
1	Netherlands	Adelinde Cornelissen	Parzival	78.541%	82.542%	161.083
1	Netherlands	Edward Gal	Totilas	83.860%	86.458%	170.318
1	Netherlands	Imke Schellekens-Bartels	Sunrise	73.739%	73.500%	147.239
1	Netherlands					478.640
2	Germany	Christoph Koschel	Donnperignon	72.644%	74.333%	146.977
2	Germany	Matthias-Alexander Rath	Sterntaler-UNICEF	71.185%	72.583%	143.768
2	Germany	Isabell Werth	Satchmo	75.836%	76.417%	152.253
2	Germany					442.998
3	(United Kingdom) Great Britain	Laura Bechtolsheimer	Mistral Hojris	77.295%	79.375%	156.670
3	(United Kingdom) Great Britain	Fiona Bigwood	Wie-Atlantico de Ymas	67.264%	66.542%	133.806
3	(United Kingdom) Great Britain	Emile Faurie	Elmegardens Marequis	65.015%	67.667%	132.682
3	(United Kingdom) Great Britain					423.158
4	Belgium	Jeroen Devroe	Apollo van het Vijverhof	69.726%	69.333%	139.059
4	Belgium	Philippe Jorissen	Le Beau	66.231%	66.375%	132.606
4	Belgium	Stefan van Ingelgem	Withney van't Genthof	67.325%	68.792%	136.117
4	Belgium					407.782
5	Canada	Bonny Bonnello	Pikardi	64.316%	60.583%	124.899
5	Canada	Ashley Holzer	Pop Art	69.027%	68.750%	137.777
5	Canada	Belinda Trussell	Anton	68.024%	67.125%	135.149
5	Canada					397.825
6	Spain	Claudio Castilla Ruiz	Jade de MV	68.176%	64.083%	139.059
6	Spain	Rafael Ortiz	G-Nidium	66.505%	64.792%	131.297
6	Spain	José María Sanchez Cobos	Fogonero IX	66.687%	63.292%	129.979
6	Spain					393.535
7	Denmark	Mikala Münter Gundersen	Leonberg	66.930%	61.875%	128.805
7	Denmark	Anne van Olst	Clearwater	67.052%	67.917%	134.969
7	Denmark	Anne Troensegaard	Seduc	65.684%	62.875%	128.559
7	Denmark					392.333
-	Australia	Hayley Beresford	Relâmpago do Retiro	65.319%	65.708%	131.027
-	Australia	Lyndal Oatley	Potifar	65.106%	did not start	-
-	Australia	Brett Parbery	Victory Salute	70.365%	69.042%	139.407
-	Australia					eliminated
-	Sweden	Anette Christensson	Normandie JB	63.100%	did not start	-
-	Sweden	Patrik Kittel	Florett AS	67.234%	67.375%	134.609
-	Sweden	Kristian von Krusenstierna	April 4Cible	63.465%	did not start	-
-	Sweden					eliminated

== Nations Cup of Germany (four-in-hand-driving) ==
The four-in-hand-driving nations cup is the official four-in-hand-driving competition of Germany.

The first part of this competition, the driven dressage driving, will be held at Thursday, May 15, 2010 at 10:30 am. The second competition, the obstacle cone driving, will be held at Friday, July 16, 2010 at 9:00 pm. The final phase, the marathon, will be held at Saturday, July 17, 2010 at 2:25 pm.

=== team result ===
	Team	Driver	driven dressage score	obstacle cone driving score	marathon score	Total score	prize money (€)
1	Netherlands	IJsbrand Chardon	47.49	0.00	101.70		
1	Netherlands	Koos de Ronde	48.38	11.00	116.71		
1	Netherlands	Theo Timmerman	42.11	3.00	111.59		
1	Netherlands					305.89	5,600 €
2	Germany	Michael Brauchle	63.62	6.00	110.09		
2	Germany	Rainer Duen	52.22	0.00	120.80		
2	Germany	Christoph Sandmann	45.95	0.00	108.39		
2	Germany					316.65	3,500 €
3	Switzerland	Felix Affrini	65.54	12.81	142.58		
3	Switzerland	Werner Ulrich	55.94	9.00	104.17		
3	Switzerland	Daniel Würgler	46.72	3.00	110.89		
3	Switzerland					329.72	2,500 €
4	Hungary	Jozsef Dobrovitz	55.68	3.00	194.31		
4	Hungary	Zoltan Lazar	54.53	0.00	105.04		
4	Hungary	Csaba Vaczi	77.18	4.83	134.59		
4	Hungary					352.84	2,000 €
5	Sweden	Tomas Eriksson	59.14	7.36	111.13		
5	Sweden	Fredrik Persson	50.82	6.00	118.47		
5	Sweden					352.92	1,800 €
6	United States	James Henry Fairclough	45.31	0.00	150.21		
6	United States	Tucker Johnson	48.51	6.00	117.06		
6	United States					367.09	1,600 €
7	France	Stéphane Chouzenoux	56.32	12.51	188.28		
7	France	Thibault Coudry	61.06	3.00	140.63		
7	France	Fabrice Martin	72.96	4.70	132.27		
7	France					414.62	-

(grey penalties points do not count for the team result)

=== individual result ===
	Driver	driven dressage score	obstacle cone driving score	marathon score	Total score	prize money (€)
1	(Australia) Boyd Exell	36.61	101.81	4.48	142.90	5,000 €
2	(Netherlands) IJsbrand Chardon	47.49	101.70	0.00	149.19	3,000 €
3	(Germany) Christoph Sandmann	45.95	108.39	0.00	154.34	2,250 €
4	(Netherlands) Theo Timmerman	42.11	111.59	3.00	156.70	1,500 €
5	(Hungary) Zoltan Lazar	54.53	105.04	0.00	159.57	750 €
6	(Switzerland) Daniel Würgler	46.72	110.89	3.00	160.61	500 €
7	(Switzerland) Werner Ulrich	55.94	104.17	9.00	169.11	280 €
8	(United States) Tucker S. Johnson	48.51	117.06	6.00	171.57	220 €
9	(Germany) Rainer Duen	52.22	120.80	0.00	173.02	150 €
10	(Germany) Dirk Gerkens	56.96	116.29	0.50	173.75	150 €

(top 10 of 24 competitors)

== Best of Champions ==
The "Best of Champions" was a special show jumping competition. The current Olympic champion, winner of World Equestrian Games, the current European champion and the last year winner of the Show jumping grand prix of Aachen have the right to start in this competition.

The competition was a show jumping competition with horse change. Each rider start in the first round with his own horse, in the second, third and in the fourth round with the horses of the other competitors. If a jump-off is necessary, each rider start again with his own horse.

It was held at Saturday, July 17, 2010 at 7:00 pm.

	Horse	Athlete van't Heike (horse of Eric Lamaze)	Calimero van't Roth (horse of Jos Lansink)	Brazil-M (horse of Kevin Staut)	Upsilon d´Ocquier (horse of Denis Lynch)	Total score	Prize money (€)
	Rider	Penalties	Penalties	Penalties	Penalties	Penalties	Prize money (€)
1	(France) Kevin Staut (as 2009 European champion)	0	0	0	0	0	15,000 €
2	(Belgium) Jos Lansink (as 2006 World champion)	0	4	0	4	8	12,000 €
3	(Republic of Ireland) Denis Lynch (as 2009 winner of the Show jumping grand prix of Aachen)	4	4	4	0	12	10,000 €
4	(Canada) Eric Lamaze (as 2008 Olympic champion)	0	8	8	0	16	8,000 €

Horse Ranking

- 1.) Atlete van't Heike and Upsilon d´Ocquier - each 4 penalties
- 3.) Brazil-M - 12 penalties
- 4.) Calimero van't Roth - 16 penalties

== Grand Prix Freestyle ==
The Grand Prix Freestyle (or Grand Prix Kür), also called the "Großer Dressurpreis von Aachen" (Grand dressage price of Aachen) was the final competition of the CDIO 5* at the 2010 CHIO Aachen.

A Grand Prix Freestyle is a Freestyle dressage competition. The level of this competition is at least the level of a Grand Prix de Dressage, but it can be higher than the level of a Grand Prix Spécial.

The Grand Prix Freestyle at the CDIO 5* (2010 CHIO Aachen) was held at Sunday, July 18, 2010 at 10:00 am. The Deutsche Bank was the sponsor of this competition.

	Rider	Horse	Score	prize money (€)
1	(Netherlands) Edward Gal	Totilas	90.964%	30.000 €
2	(Netherlands) Adelinde Cornelissen	Parzival	85.607%	18.000 €
3	(Netherlands) Imke Schellekens-Bartels	Sunrise	81.000%	13.500 €
4	(Germany) Isabell Werth	Satchmo	80.786%	9.000 €
5	(United Kingdom) Laura Bechtolsheimer	Mistral Hojris	80.500%	5.000 €

== Großer Preis von Aachen ==
The "Großer Preis von Aachen", the show jumping grand prix of Aachen, was the mayor show jumping competition of the 2010 CHIO Aachen. It was held at Sunday, July 18, 2010 at 3:00 pm. The competition was a show jumping competition with two round and one jump-off, the height of the fences were up to 1.60 meters.

The main sponsor of the "Großer Preis von Aachen" is Rolex. The Grand Prix will be endowed with 350,000 €.

	Rider	Horse	Round 1	Round 2		Jump-off		prize money
	Rider	Horse	Round 1	Penalties	Time (s)	Penalties	Time (s)	prize money
1	(Canada) Eric Lamaze	Hickstead	0	0	-	0	51.62	115,000 €
2	(Switzerland) Pius Schwizer	Carlina	0	0	-	0	51.86	80,000 €
3	(Spain) Sergio Alvarez Moya	Action-Breaker	0	0	-	0	57.55	55,000 €
4	(Germany) Meredith Michaels-Beerbaum	Shutterfly	0	0	-	8	54.81	30,000 €
5	(France) Kevin Staut	Kraque Boom	0	4	81,79			20,000 €

(Top 5 of 40 Competitors)

== Television / live video ==
The German TV stations (WDR, ARD, ZDF and Phoenix) broadcast more than 20 hours from the 2010 CHIO Aachen, most of them live. Across Europe Eurosport broadcast a two-hour summary programme of the 2010 CHIO Aachen (Show jumping nations cup and show jumping grand prix).

Most of the competition are streamed live by the German website clipmyhorse.de (not marathon driving, cross county phase of eventing and show jumping nations cup, weblink see external links).
