= 2011 European Show Jumping Championship =

The 2011 European Show Jumping Championship was held between September 13 and September 18, 2011, in Madrid in Spain.

It was the 31st edition of the European Show Jumping Championships, only in the 19th time team medals were awarded.

== Organization ==
=== Before the event ===
In April 2009 the FEI chose the Spanish capital Madrid to host the 2011 European Show Jumping Championship. Madrid was in the last years alternately with Gijón location of the annual Spanish Nations Cup horse show in Show Jumping.

It was the second time in European Show Jumping Championship history – after 1993 in Gijón – that Spain held this sports event.

=== Event and location ===
The European Show Jumping Championship was opened in the afternoon on Tuesday, September 13. The sport at the Championship had started on Wednesday. Parallel to the European Championships, a CSI 3*-Show jumping horse show is held. The Event will end on Sunday after the prize giving ceremony.

The event is held at the Club de Campo Villa de Madrid.

== Competitions ==
=== General ===
The team competition and the individual competition is held from Wednesday to Friday at the same competitions. The individual competition will end after a final competition on Sunday.

=== Timetable ===
The first competition was a speed and handiness competition. Here the jumping faults are converted to seconds and added to the time in seconds. After this competition the calculated seconds are converted into point for the European Championship individual ranking.

The second competition was a show jumping competition with two rounds. It is held on Thursday and Friday. On Friday only the best ten nations and the best 50 riders are allowed to start in the second round (all team riders of the ten teams are allowed to start). The results of three riders per team counts for the team result. After the Friday competition the team medals will be awarded. The best 25 riders start on Sunday in one more show jumping competition with two rounds. After this competition the individual medals are awarded.

== Results ==
=== Provisional result after first day ===
After the first day of the competitions the French team was in the lead. The teams of German, Sweden, the Netherlands, Great Britain and Belgium follow with a distance of less than eight points.

In the individual ranking with Olivier Guillon also a French rider was in the lead. 27 riders follow with a distance of less than four points.

Individual ranking:

| rank | rider | horse | seconds (ranking points) |
|---|---|---|---|
| 1 | (France) Olivier Guillon | Lord de Theize | 78,85 (0,00) |
| 2 | (Austria) Stefan Eder | Chilli van Dijk | 79,93 (0,54) |
| 3 | (Switzerland) Beat Mändli | Louis | 80,11 (0,63) |
| 4 | (Germany) Carsten-Otto Nagel | Corradina | 80,24 (0,69) |
| 5 | (France) Kevin Staut | Silvana | 80,43 (0,79) |

Team ranking:

| rank | team | rider and horse | ranking points |
|---|---|---|---|
| 1 | France | Michel Robert; Kellemoi de Pepita; Pénélope Leprevost; Mylord Carthago; Kevin Staut; Silvana; Olivier Guillon; Lord de Theize | 2.95; 2.16 (2.55) 0.79 0.00 |
| 2 | Germany | Marco Kutscher; Cornet Obolensky; Carsten-Otto Nagel; Corradina; Janne Friederike Meyer; Lambrasco; Ludger Beerbaum; Gotha FRH | 4.41; 1.73 0.69 1.99 (3.23) |
| 3 | Sweden | Malin Baryard-Johnsson; Tornesch; Angelica Augustsson; Mic Mac du Tillard; Henrik von Eckermann; Coupe de Coeur; Rolf-Göran Bengtsson; Ninja | 6.74 (2.93) 2.73 2.24 1.77 |

=== Provisional result after second day ===
The show jumping course was very difficult, much riders had more than one fault. Winning team of the day was the Netherlands. With three round with no faults the team is now in the lead. The French team lost his lead because of faults, distributed to all team riders.

In individual ranking the second placed rider from the first day, Stefan Eder, had 16 penalty points – now he is 37th. Also the former leader, Olivier Guillon, had a jumping fault (now 9th). In the lead is now German team rider Carsten-Otto Nagel.

Individual ranking:

| rank | rider | horse | penalty points |
| rank | rider | horse | day 1 | day 2 | total |
|---|---|---|---|---|---|
| 1 | (Germany) Carsten-Otto Nagel | Corradina | 0.69 | 0.00 | 0.69 |
| 2 | (Republic of Ireland) Billy Twomey | Tinka´s Serenade | 0.95 | 0.00 | 0.95 |
| 3 | (United Kingdom) Nick Skelton | Carlo | 1.04 | 0.00 | 1.04 |
| 4 | (Belgium) Grégory Wathelet | Copin van de Broy | 1.53 | 0.00 | 1.53 |
| 5 | (Netherlands) Gerco Schröder | New Orleans | 1.54 | 0.00 | 1.54 |

Team ranking:

| rank | team | rider and horse | ranking points |
| rank | team | rider and horse | day 1 | day 2 | total |
|---|---|---|---|---|---|
| 1 | Netherlands | Eric van der Vleuten; Utascha SFN; Maikel van der Vleuten; Verdi; Gerco Schröder; New Orleans; Jeroen Dubbeldam; Simon | 7.42 (5.59) 3.37 1.54 2.51 | 0.00; 0.00 (9.00) 0.00 0.00 | 7.42 |
| 2 | Germany | Marco Kutscher; Cornet Obolensky; Carsten-Otto Nagel; Corradina; Janne Friederike Meyer; Lambrasco; Ludger Beerbaum; Gotha FRH | 4.41; 1.73 0.69 1.99 (3.23) | 6.00 (8.00) 0.00 1.00 5.00 | 10.41 |
| 3 | France | Michel Robert; Kellemoi de Pepita; Pénélope Leprevost; Mylord Carthago; Kevin Staut; Silvana; Olivier Guillon; Lord de Theize | 2.95; 2.16 (2.55) 0.79 0.00 | 13.00; 5.00 4.00 (8.00) 4.00 | 15.95 |

=== Provisional result after third day ===
At the third day, the riders had to ride the same show jumping course as Thursday. The winning team of Thursday, the Netherlands, had some faults. Germany and France benefit this, both teams had three rounds with zero faults at this day.

The German team had won the team gold medal already after the third rider (with in total four point on Thursday). The last rider of the team, Ludger Beerbaum, could improve the result with a round without faults. France had won the silver medal, Great Britain team won bronze. The teams of the Netherlands, Sweden and Switzerland were in the places four to six, in qualification for the 2012 Summer Olympics.

In the not final individual ranking the German Carsten-Otto Nagel with Corradina are again in the lead. Billy Twomey (Thursday second placed) and Gregory Wathelet (Thursday fourth placed) had both 16 penalty points.

Individual ranking:

| rank | rider | horse | penalty points |
| rank | rider | horse | day 1 | day 2 | day 3 | total |
|---|---|---|---|---|---|---|
| 1 | (Germany) Carsten-Otto Nagel | Corradina | 0.69 | 0.00 | 0.00 | 0.69 |
| 2 | (United Kingdom) Nick Skelton | Carlo | 1.04 | 0.00 | 0.00 | 1.04 |
| 3 | (Netherlands) Gerco Schröder | New Orleans | 1.54 | 0.00 | 0.00 | 1.54 |
| 4 | (Portugal) Luciana Diniz | Winningmood | 0.98 | 4.00 | 0.00 | 4.98 |
| 5 | (Sweden) Rolf-Göran Bengtsson | Ninja | 1.77 | 0.00 | 4.00 | 5.77 |

=== Final results ===
==== Team result ====
| rank | team | rider and horse | converted points | penalty points |
| rank | team | rider and horse | day 1 | day 2 | day 3 | total |
|---|---|---|---|---|---|---|
| 1 | Germany | Marco Kutscher; Cornet Obolensky; Carsten-Otto Nagel; Corradina; Janne Friederike Meyer; Lambrasco; Ludger Beerbaum; Gotha FRH | 4.41; 1.73 0.69 1.99 (3,23) | 6 (8) 0 1 5 | 0; 0 0 (4) 0 | 10.41 |
| 2 | France | Michel Robert; Kellemoi de Pepita; Pénélope Leprevost; Mylord Carthago; Kevin Staut; Silvana; Olivier Guillon; Lord de Theize | 2.95; 2.16 (2.55) 0.79 0.00 | 13; 5 4 (8) 4 | 0; 0 0 0 (4) | 15.95 |
| 3 | Great Britain | Nick Skelton; Carlo; Guy Williams; Titus; Ben Maher; Tripple X III; John Whitaker; Peppermill | 9.46; 1.04 (7.01) 5.66 (9,63) | 8; 0 (12) 4 4 | 5; 0 1 4 (8) | 22.46 |
| 4 | Netherlands | Eric van der Vleuten; Utascha SFN; Maikel van der Vleuten; Verdi; Gerco Schröder; New Orleans; Jeroen Dubbeldam; Simon | 7.42 (5.59) 3.37 1.54 2.51 | 0; 0 (9) 0 0 | 16; 8 (12) 0 8 | 26.49 |
| 5 | Sweden | Malin Baryard-Johnsson; Tornesch; Angelica Augustsson; Mic Mac du Tillard; Henrik von Eckermann; Coupe de Coeur; Rolf-Göran Bengtsson; Ninja | 6.74 (2.93) 2.73 2.24 1,77 | 12 (8) 8 4 0 | 16; 8 (8) 4 4 | 34.74 |
| 6 | Switzerland | Steve Guerdat; Jalisca Solier; Beat Mändli; Louis; Clarissa Crotta; West Side; Pius Schwizer; Carlina | 14.66; 7.16 0.63 (15.12) 6.87 | 17; 4 9 (13) 4 | 9 (8) 0 5 4 | 40.66 |

==== Individual result ====
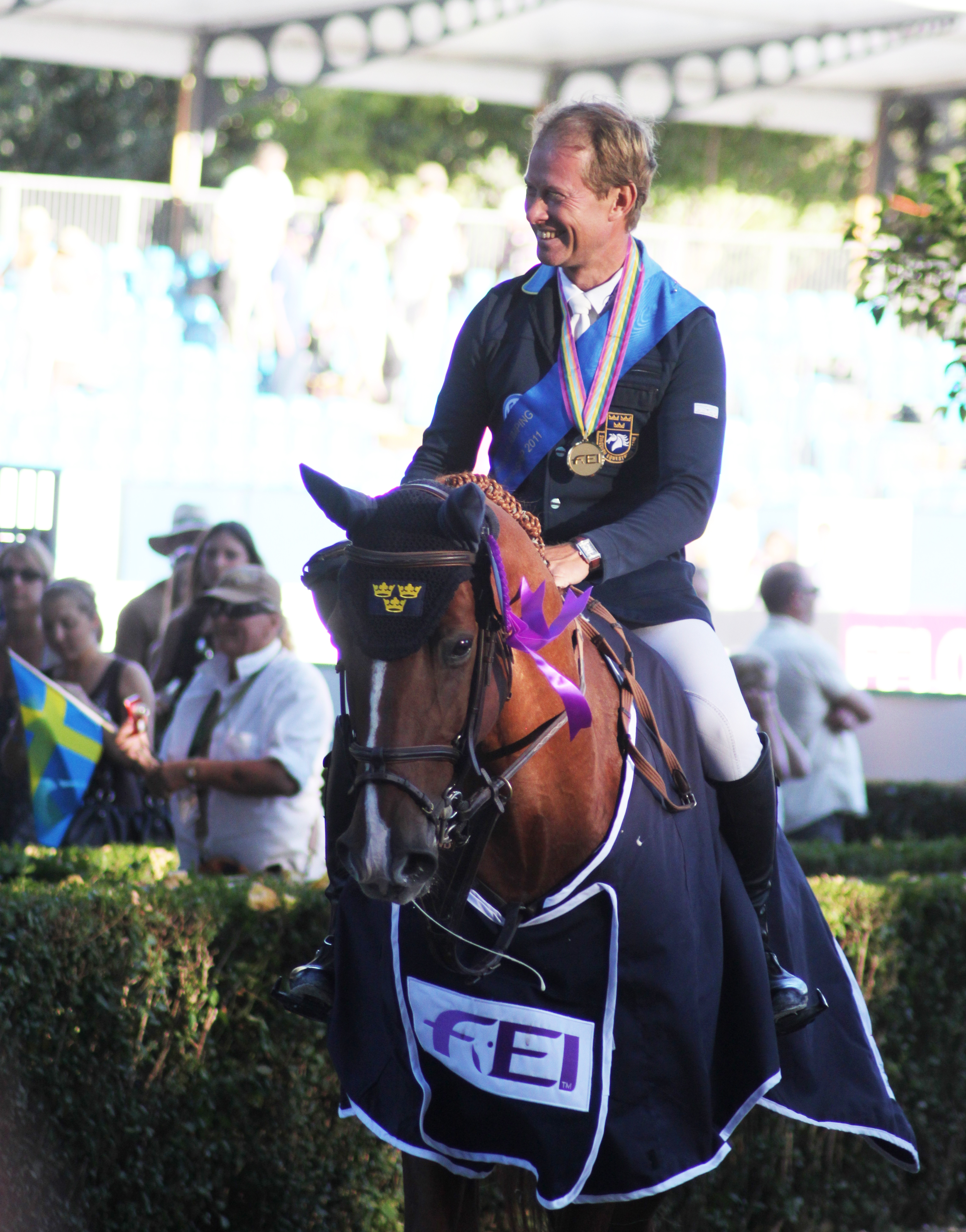
Rolf-Göran Bengtsson and Ninja La Silla

At the last day of the event the riders had to ride a show jumping competition with two different rounds. Only 22 of 25 qualified rider start in this competition.

In round one of this competition first placed Carsten-Otto Nagel and second placed Nick Skelton had both one jumping fault. So the Dutch rider Gerco Schröder, who had no faults in this round, was in the lead. Three riders of the 22 did not start in round two because they had no chance more to get a real good position in the final ranking.

Also the second round brought further changes in the individual ranking. After the rides of Nagel and Skelton (bouth had again four penalty points) the Swedish rider Rolf-Göran Bengtsson was in the lead. The last rider, Gerco Schröder, had a lead of more than five point before round two – but he had one fault in the mid of the course and again one fault on the last fence. So he lost his gold medal (like two days before in the team competition) and finished fourth. so the new European Champion was Rolf-Göran Bengtsson with the 16-year-old gelding Ninja.

The only riders who were clear in both rounds was Jeroen Dubbeldam with Simon und Henrik von Eckermann with Coupe de Coeur.

| rank | rider | horse | converted points | penalty points |
| rank | rider | horse | 1st competition (speed & handiness) | 3rd competition round 1 | 3rd competition round 2 | 3rd competition round 1 | 3rd competition round 2 | result |
|---|---|---|---|---|---|---|---|---|
| 1 | (Sweden) Rolf-Göran Bengtsson | Ninja | 1.77 | 0 | 4 | 0 | 1 | 5.77 |
| 2 | (Germany) Carsten-Otto Nagel | Corradina | 0.69 | 0 | 0 | 4 | 4 | 8.69 |
| 3 | (United Kingdom) Nick Skelton | Carlo | 1.04 | 0 | 0 | 4 | 4 | 9.04 |
| 4 | (Netherlands) Gerco Schröder | New Orleans | 1.54 | 0 | 0 | 0 | 8 | 9.54 |
| 5 | (Sweden) Henrik von Eckermann | Coupe de Coeur | 2.24 | 4 | 4 | 0 | 0 | 10.24 |
| 6 | (Netherlands) Jeroen Dubbeldam | Simon | 2.51 | 0 | 8 | 0 | 0 | 10.51 |
| 7 | (France) Pénélope Leprevost | Mylord Carthago | 2.55 | 4 | 0 | 4 | 0 | 10.55 |
| 8 | (Germany) Ludger Beerbaum | Gotha FRH | 3.23 | 5 | 0 | 4 | 0 | 12.23 |
| 9 | (Portugal) Luciana Diniz | Winningmood | 0.98 | 4 | 0 | 4 | 4 | 12.98 |
| 10 | (Switzerland) Beat Mändli | Louis | 0.63 | 9 | 0 | 0 | 4 | 13.63 |

== More informations ==
The collection and data communication of the result was performed, as already at the 2010 FEI World Equestrian Games, by Dutch company Sport Computer Graphics (SCG).

The main competition of the CSI 3*-horse show is the traditional Kings Cup (Gran Premio – Copa S.M. El Rey). It was held on Saturday (September 17, 2011) at 4:45 pm. It was a show jumping competition with one round and one jump-off.
