= 2010 Meydan FEI Nations Cup =

The 2010 Meydan FEI Nations Cup was the 2010 edition of the FEI Nations Cup, a premier international team Grand Prix show jumping competition run by the FEI and sponsored by the Meydan Group from Dubai. It was held at eight European venues from May 14 to August 6, 2010.

== 2010 show schedule ==
Date	Show	Video	Winning team
May 14, 2010	Jumping International de France 2010; La Baule, France; CSIO***** €200,000	Video	France
May 28, 2010	Piazza di Siena 2010 (Italy) Rome, Italy; CSIO***** €200,000	Video	France
June 4, 2010	CSIO Schweiz 2010 (Switzerland) St. Gallen, Switzerland; CSIO***** €200,000	Video	France
June 18, 2010	CHIO Rotterdam 2010 (Netherlands) Rotterdam, Netherlands; CSIO***** €200,000	Video	United States
July 9, 2010	Falsterbo Horse Show 2010 (Sweden) Skanör med Falsterbo, Sweden; CSIO***** €200,000	Video	Sweden
July 15, 2010	CHIO Aachen 2010 (Germany) Aachen, Germany; CSIO***** €200,000	Video	Ireland
July 30, 2010	2010 Longines Royal International Horse Show (United Kingdom) Hickstead, United Kingdom; CSIO***** €200,000	Video	(United Kingdom) Great Britain
August 6, 2010	2010 Dublin Horse Show (Republic of Ireland) Dublin, Ireland; CSIO***** €200,000	Video	Netherlands

== Final standings ==
	Team	Points								Total
	Team	FRA (France)	ITA (Italy)	SUI (Switzerland)	NED (Netherlands)	SWE (Sweden)	GER (Germany)	GBR (United Kingdom)	IRL (Republic of Ireland)	Total
1	France	10	10	10	3.5	5.5	4.5	5	5	53.5
2	United States	7	3	2	10	3.5	6	6	6.5	44
3	(United Kingdom) Great Britain	5.5	7	6	7	2	1	10	4	42.5
4	Ireland	3	5.5	5	1.5	3.5	10	3	6.5	38
5	Germany	5.5	4	7	5	0	7	7	0	35.5
6	Netherlands	0	0	1	6	7	3	4	10	31
7	Spain	4	5.5	3	3.5	5.5	0	1.5	2.5	25.5
8	Sweden	1	1	0	0	10	2	1.5	2.5	18
9	Switzerland	2	2	4	1.5	1	4.5	0	1	16
10	Poland	0	0	0	0	0	0	—	—	0

The national equestrian federation of Canada refrained the start in the Meydan FEI Nations Cup second time after 2009, so Poland moved into the Meydan FEI Nations Cup for the 2010 season. Because of a decision of the Court of Arbitration for Sport the team of (United Kingdom) Great Britain was allowed participate in the 2010 Meydan FEI Nations Cup.

At the end of the season, Spain, Sweden, Switzerland and Poland were relegated to the 2011 FEI Nations Cup Promotional League.
