= Mark Armstrong (equestrian) =

British international show jumper

Mark Armstrong (born 23 June 1961) is a British international show jumper.

Armstrong gained a silver medal at the 1993 European Championships, and came second in the H&H Foxhunter category in the following year's British Horse of the Year Show. He competed in the 2002 World Championships in Leipzig and has been a member of the British team at 33 different events since 1987. He was a member of the four-person British team which finished third at the 2010 FEI Nations Cup of France, riding Thesaura.
