= Fanny Verliefden =

Belgian equestrian

Personal information
- Born: Fanny Verliefden; 29 March 1985 (age 41)

Sport
- Country: Belgium
- Sport: Dressage
- Team: Dressuurstal Verwimp, Wiekevorst

Achievements and titles
- World finals: 2018 FEI World Equestrian Games

Fanny Verliefden (born 29 March 1985) is a Belgian equestrian athlete and trainer. She competed at the 2018 FEI World Equestrian Games and at the European Dressage Championships in 2015 and 2019. In 2016, she was selected to represent Belgium as an individual combination at the 2016 Summer Olympics, but due to an injury of her horse Annarico, she had to withdraw.
