= Brett Parbery =

Australian dressage rider (born 1971)

Personal information
- Full name: Brett Parbery
- Nickname: Parbs
- Nationality: Australian
- Born: 23 September 1971 (age 54) Dorrigo, Australia
- Website: www.brettparbery.com.au

Sport
- Country: Australia
- Sport: Equestrian

Achievements and titles
- World finals: 2018 FEI World Equestrian Games, 2010 FEI World Equestrian Games

Brett Parbery (born 23 September 1971) is an Australian dressage rider and trainer. He competed at the World Equestrian Games in Lexington 2010 where he became 9th individually, which is the highest rank for an Australian dressage rider during the World Championships. In 2018 he represented Australia as well during the World Equestrian Games in Tryon. In 2010 he qualified for the World Cup Finals in 's-Hertogenbosch and finished 10th.

== Biography ==
He started riding at an age of three, while his family had its own stable. He started as a rodeo rider and trained many western horses. Later he switched to dressage and competed in 1999 for the first time at international level. During his international career, he competed at many shows worldwide including various international competitions throughout the world in Australia, the United States and in Europe. He trained for a few years with the Dutch world Champion Edward Gal.

== Olympic campaign ==
Brett Parbery tried to qualify for the Olympic Games in London 2012. Still, his top horse Victory Salute, with which he was individually ninth at the World Championships in 2010, must be euthanized. In Lord of Loxley, he found a successor with which he hoped to make his Olympic dream come true. Unfortunately, he was unable to qualify for the Australian team. In 2016 he was named as non-travelling reserve rider for the Australian Olympic team in Rio de Janeiro, Brazil.
