= Nicolas Delmotte =

French equestrian

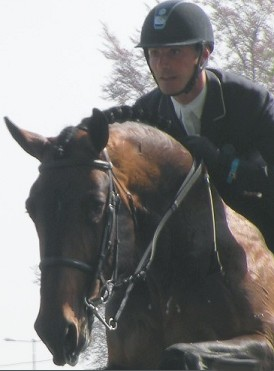

Personal information
- Nationality: French
- Born: 29 August 1978 (age 48) Flines-lez-Raches

Sport
- Sport: Equestrian
- Event: Show jumping

Nicolas Delmotte (born 29 August 1978) is a French show jumping competitor. He represented France at the 2020 Summer Olympics in Tokyo 2021, competing in individual jumping.
