= Sergio Álvarez Moya =

Spanish equestrian

Sergio Álvarez
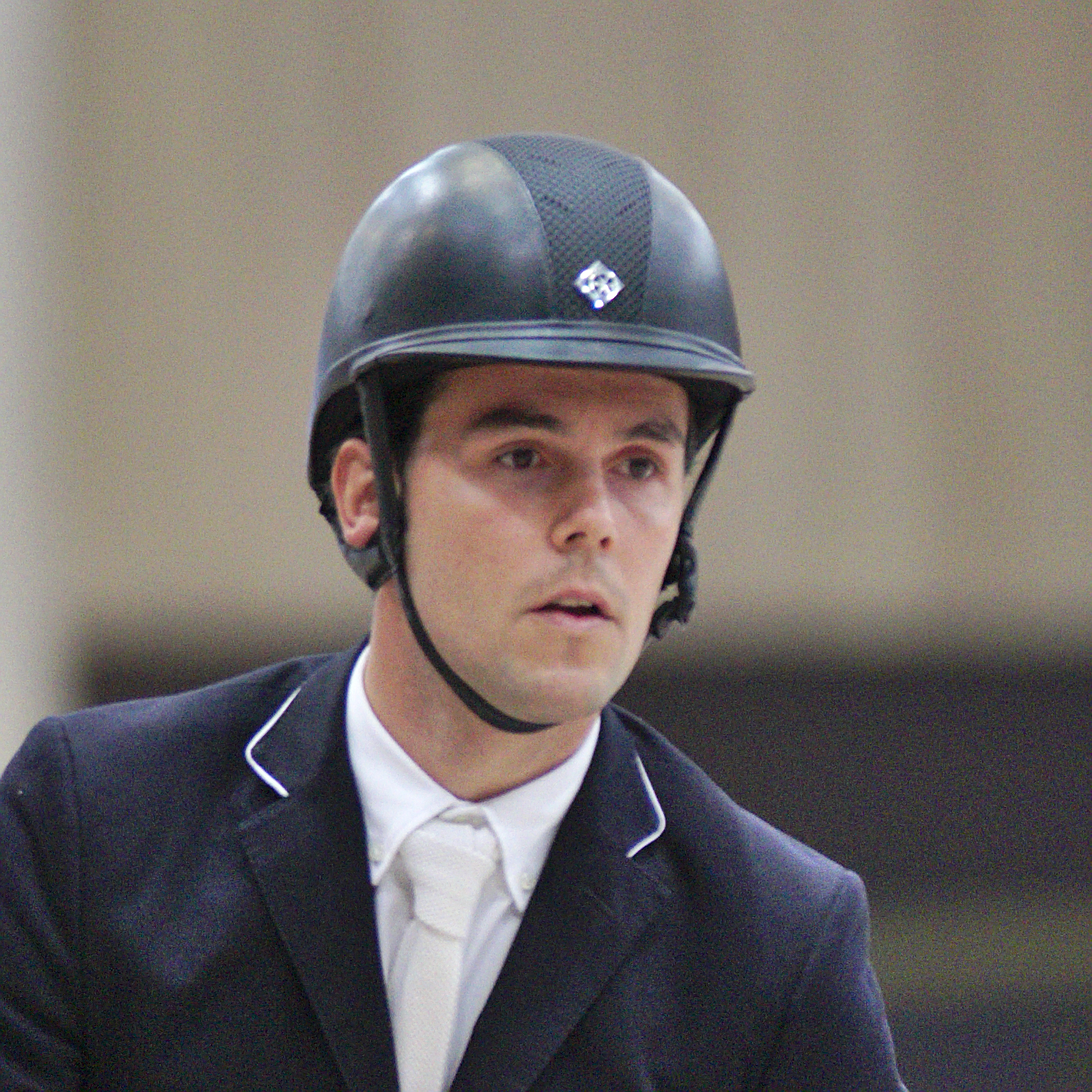
- Álvarez in 2013

Personal information
- Full name: Sergio Álvarez Moya
- Nationality: Spain
- Discipline: Show jumping
- Born: 7 January 1985 (age 41); Avilés, Asturias, Spain
- Height: 174 cm (5 ft 9 in)
Medal record
Equestrian
Representing Spain
Mediterranean Games
Silver medal – second place	2009 Pescara	Team jumping
European Young Riders Championships
Gold medal – first place	2001 Gijón	Individual jumping

Sergio Álvarez Moya (born 7 January 1985) is a Spanish equestrian who competes in the sport of show jumping.

== Career ==
On 22 July 2001, Álvarez Moya won the Junior European Show Jumping Championships held at Las Mestas Sports Complex in Gijón, Spain, over Felix Hassmann and Michael Kearins.

On 18 July 2010, he achieved the third position at the 2010 Großer Preis von Aachen, the mayor competition of the 2010 CHIO Aachen.

On 9 June 2011, Álvarez Moya finished as runner-up in the 2011 Global Champions Tour of Cannes.

On 28 April 2013, he finished in the fourth position of the Show Jumping World Cup held at Gothenburg.

On 21 August 2015, he qualified with the Spanish team for the Equestrian at the 2016 Summer Olympics. In the individual competition, he qualified for the Final, but failed in the attempt to get a medal, finishing in the 20th position.
