= Peter Charles =

Irish-British equestrian

Peter Charles MBE

Personal information
- Full name: Peter Charles
- Nationality: British
- Discipline: Show jumping
- Born: 18 January 1960 (age 65); Liverpool, England
- Height: 5 ft 10 in (1.78 m)
- Weight: 168 lb (76 kg; 12 st 0 lb)
Medal record
Equestrian
Representing Great Britain
Olympic Games
Gold medal – first place	2012 London	Team jumping
Representing Ireland
European Championships
Gold medal – first place	1995 St. Gallen	Individual jumping
Gold medal – first place	2001 Arnhem	Team jumping

Peter Charles MBE (born 18 January 1960) is a British equestrian who competes in the sport of show jumping.

Originally a competitor for Great Britain, Charles changed nationalities to Irish in 1992. In 2007, he relinquished his status as an Irish rider and once again began representing Great Britain. He was in the British team which won the gold medal at the 2012 Olympics.

Charles was appointed Member of the Order of the British Empire (MBE) in the 2013 New Year Honours for services to equestrianism.

Charles reportedly sold his gold medal-winning horse, Vindicat W, to rock star Bruce Springsteen for his showjumper daughter Jessica.

He is the father of Harry Charles, a member of the British team that won show jumping gold at the 2024 Paris Summer Olympics.

== See also ==
- 2012 Summer Olympics and Paralympics gold post boxes
