= Philipp Weishaupt =

German equestrian

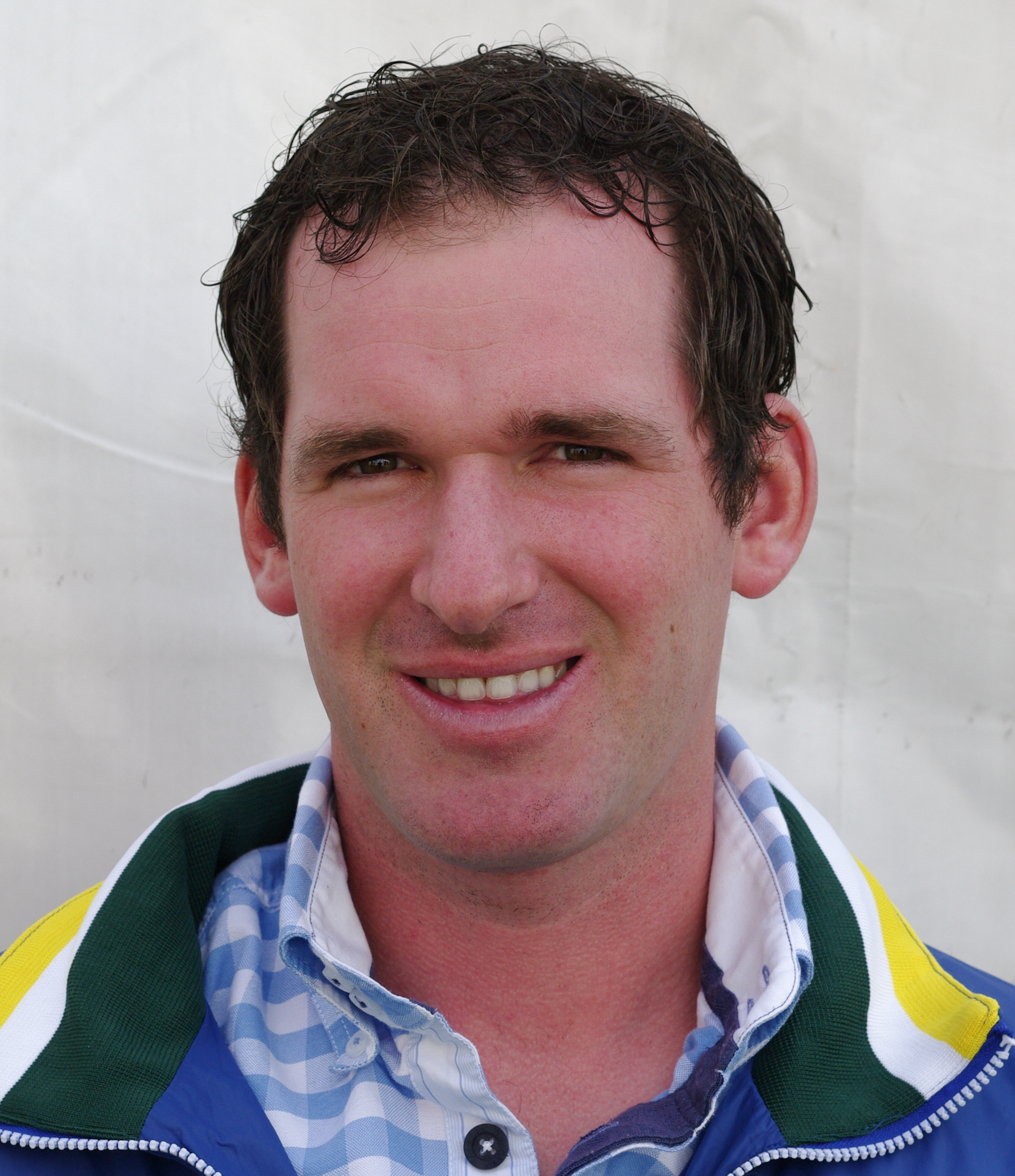
- Weishaupt in 2014

Personal information
- Nationality: German
- Born: 20 July 1985 (age 40) Augsburg, Germany

Sport
- Country: Germany
- Sport: Equestrian
Medal record
Equestrian
Representing Germany
European Championships
Silver medal – second place	2023 Milan	Individual jumping
Bronze medal – third place	2006 Athens	Team jumping

Philipp Weishaupt (born 20 July 1985, Augsburg, Germany) is a German equestrian. He won individual silver at the 2023 European Championships in Milan, Italy and came fourth in the team competition. He also competed at the 2017 European Championships and at 2010, 2011 and 2012 World Cup Finals. As Young Rider he won team bronze at the 2006 European Youth Championships. He was named to compete at the 2012 Olympic Games in London to represent the German team, but his horse got injured before the start of the Games.

Weishaupt has been nominated by the German Equestrian Federation to represent the German team at the 2024 Olympic Games in Paris.
