= Pius Schwizer =

Swiss equestrian

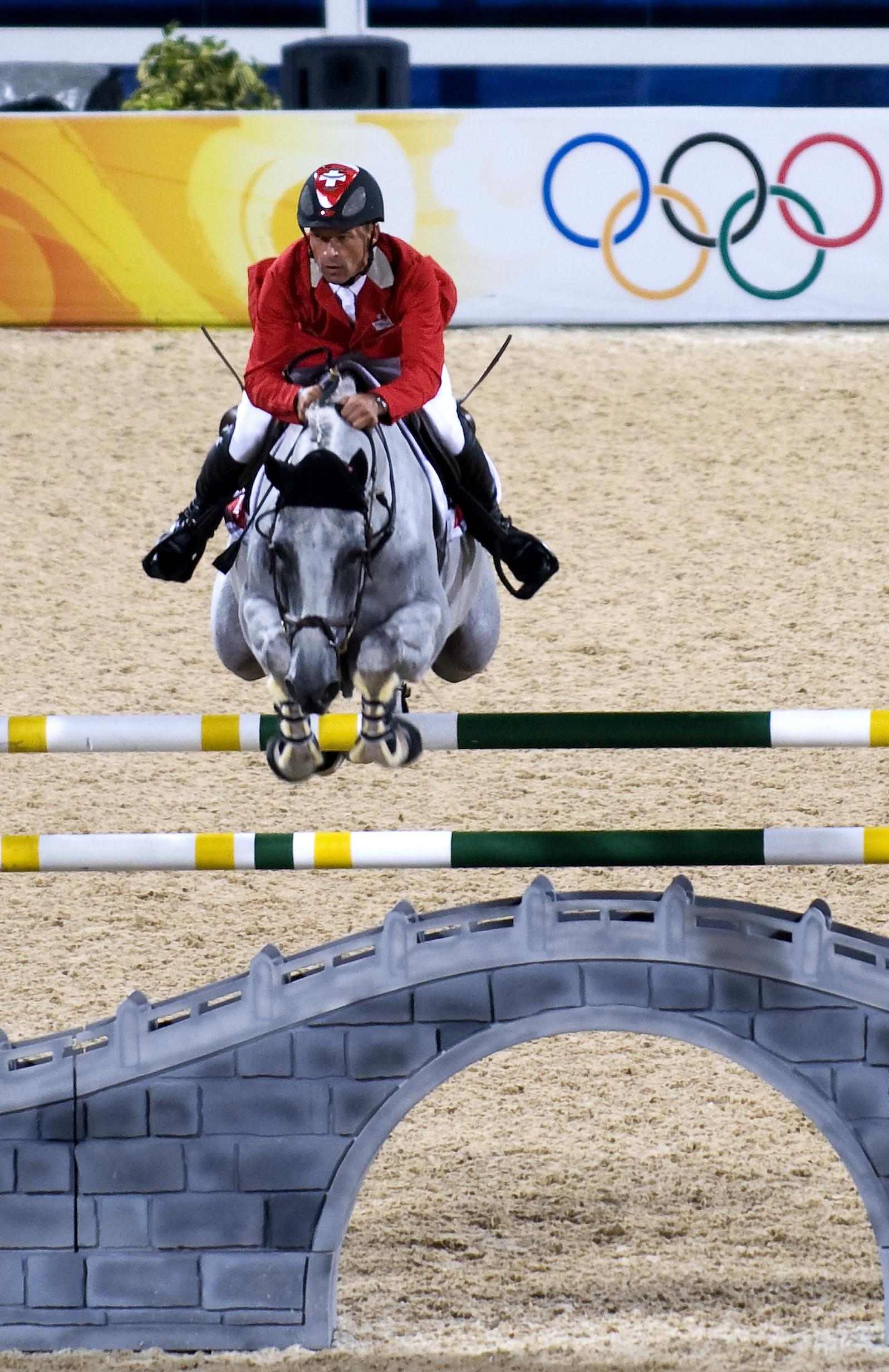
- Schwizer at the 2008 Summer Olympics

Personal information
- Nationality: Switzerland
- Discipline: Show jumping
- Born: 13 August 1962 (age 63); Oensingen, Switzerland
- Height: 5 ft 7 in (1.70 m)
- Weight: 132 lb (60 kg; 9 st 6 lb)
Medal record
Equestrian
Representing Switzerland
Olympic Games
Bronze medal – third place	2008 Beijing	Team jumping

Pius Schwizer (born 13 August 1962) is a Swiss Olympic-level equestrian who competes in the sport of show jumping.

He won the bronze medal at the 2008 Summer Olympics in team jumping following the disqualification of Norwegian rider Tony André Hansen.

In 2012 he competed at his second Olympics.

== Horses ==
current:

- Jamaica VIII (born 1997), Selle Français, Mare, Father: Socrate de Chivre, Mother's Father: Kapoc, Owner: Pius Schwizer
- Ulysse (born 1997), Belgian Warmblood, Gelding, Father: Nonstop, Mother's Father: Jus de Pomme
- Nobless M (born 1998), Holsteiner horse, Mare, Father: Calido I, Mother's Father: Landgraf I, Owner: Pius Schwizer
- Carlina (born 2001), Holsteiner horse, Mare, Father: Carvallo, Mother's Father: Landgraf I
- Calidus van het Asbornveld (born 2002), Belgian Warmblood, Gelding, Father: Kannan, Mother's Father: Feinschnitt I

former show horses:

- Unique X CH (born 1996), Gelding, Father: Ulysse de Thurin, Mother's Father: Urymate de Sainte-Hermelle
- Koby du Vartellier (born 1998), Selle Français, Gelding, Father: Espoir Breceen, Mother's Father: Hidalgo de Riou
- Loving Dancer (born 1999), Holsteiner horse, Gelding, Father: La Zarras, Mother's Father: Calypso

== Successes ==
- Olympic Games:
  - 2008: with Nobless M - Rank 3 (Team) + Rank 28. (Individual)
- European Championships:
  - 2007, Mannheim: with Nobless M - Rank 4 (Team) + Rank 22 (Individual)
  - 2009, Windsor: with Ulysee - Rank 1 (Team) + Rank 35 (Individual)
- World Cup Final:
  - 2012, 's-Hertogenbosch: Rank 3 with Ulysse and Carlina
