= Concours de Saut International =

Ranking system for show jumping competitions

Concours de Saut International (in English, "International Jumping Competition") is a discipline in competition equestrian for show jumping. All CSI events are approved by the international governing body of equestrian sport, the FEI.

The CSI is broken down into a starring system, where more competitive events with more prize money have a higher number of stars. Starring goes from 1 to 5.

- CSI*****/CSI5*: Prize money 500,000+ (CHF), (equivalent to approx. £450,000 (sterling), approx. $550,000 (USD)). Horses must be at least 7 years old.
- CSI****/CSI4*: Prize money from 250,000 to 499,999 CHF. Horses must be at least 7 years old.
- CSI***/CSI3*: Prize money 100,000 to 249,999 CHF. Horses must be at least 7 years old.
- CSI**/CSI2*: Prize money 50,000 to 99,999 CHF. Max. height 1.45m. Horses at least 6 years old.
- CSI*/CSI1*: Prize money 49,999 CHF or lower. Max height: 1.40m. Horses at least 6 years old.

Additionally, speed and height may vary between competitions. For the Nations cup held outdoors, 4* and 5* competitions must ride 400 meters per minute, 375 mpm for 3* competition, and 350 for 1* and 2* competition. All indoor competitions are ridden at 350 mpm.

== Other Terms ==
- CHIO: Official International Competition including a Nations Cup competition with more than one equestrian discipline (CHIO Aachen, CHIO Rotterdam etc.) - no more official designation
- CSIO: Official International Competition including a Nations Cup competition (such as the Dublin Horse Show, Royal International Horse Show etc.)
- CSI-W: international show jumping event with a Show Jumping World Cup competition
- CSIP/CSICh/CSIJ/CSIY/CSIU25/CSIV: competitions for Pony riders (12–16 years old on ponies, Children (12–14 on horses), Juniors (14–18), Young Riders (16-21), Under 25 (16-25) or Veterans (Women 45 or older, Men 49 or older)
- CSIAm/CSIL/CSIYH: competitions for Amateurs, competitions only for Ladies, competitions for young show jumping horses
- CSIL
