= 2011 Piazza di Siena =

The 2011 Piazza di Siena – CSIO Rome was the 2011 edition of the CSIO Rome, the Italian official show jumping horse show, at the Piazza di Siena in Rome. It was held as CSIO 5*.

The first horse show were held 1922 at the Piazza di Siena, in 1926 it was an international horse show. Since 1928 Rome is the location of the Italian official show jumping horse show (CSIO = Concours de Saut International Officiel). 2011 is the 79th edition of the CSIO Rome.

The 2011 edition of the CSIO Rome was held between May 26, 2011 and May 29, 2011. The main sponsor of the 2011 Piazza di Siena horse show was SNAI.

== FEI Nations Cup of Italy ==
The 2011 FEI Nations Cup of Italy was part of the 2011 Piazza di Siena horse show. It was the second competition of the 2011 FEI Nations Cup and was held at Friday, May 27, 2011 at 3:55 pm. The competing teams were: Ireland, France, the United States of America, the Netherlands, Denmark, Germany, Great Britain and Belgium. Also an Italian team as host nation had the chance to start in the competition.

The competition was a show jumping competition with two rounds and optionally one jump-off. The height of the fences were up to 1.60 meters. All teams were allowed to start in the second round. The competition is endowed with 200,000 €.

	Team	Rider	Horse	Round A	Round B	Total penalties	Jump-off		Prize money	scoring points
	Team	Rider	Horse	Penalties	Penalties	Total penalties	Penalties	Time (s)	Prize money	scoring points
1	Netherlands	Eric van der Vleuten	Utascha SFN	8	0					
1	Netherlands	Harry Smolders	Regina Z	8	0					
1	Netherlands	Gerco Schröder	New Orleans	1	1					
1	Netherlands	Jeroen Dubbeldam	Van Grusven Simon	0	did not start					
1	Netherlands			9	1	10			64,000 €	10
2	Belgium	Philippe Le Jeune	Vigo d’Arsouilles	0	0					
2	Belgium	Dirk Demeersman	Bufero van het Panishof	4	13					
2	Belgium	Judy-Ann Melchior	As Cold As Ice Z	4	8					
2	Belgium	Jos Lansink	Valentina	1	1					
2	Belgium			5	9	14			40,000 €	7
3	Ireland	Shane Sweetnam	Amaretto Darco	8	4					
3	Ireland	Shane Carey	Lancero	5	4					
3	Ireland	Cameron Hanley	Southwind VDL	9	9					
3	Ireland	Billy Twomey	Tinka´s Serenade	0	0					
3	Ireland			13	8	21			40,000 €	6
3	Germany	Ludger Beerbaum	Gotha FRH	4	0					
3	Germany	Daniel Deusser	Cabreado	12	9					
3	Germany	Philipp Weishaupt	Monte Bellini	1	1					
3	Germany	Marcus Ehning	Plot Blue	17	5					
3	Germany			17	6	23			16,000 €	4
3	Great Britain	Nick Skelton	Carlo	4	4					
3	Great Britain	Ben Maher	Tripple X III	16	5					
3	Great Britain	Peter Charles	Murka´s Nevada	5	5					
3	Great Britain	Robert Smith	Talan	0	17					
3	Great Britain			9	14	23			16,000 €	4
3	France	Penelope Leprevost	Mylord Carthago HN	1	4					
3	France	Simon Delestre	Couletto	1	9					
3	France	Kevin Staut	Banda De Hus	8	8					
3	France	Michel Robert	Kellemoi de Pepita	0	retired					
3	France			2	21	23			16,000 €	4
7	United States	Charlie Jayne	Athena	8	20					
7	United States	Christine McCrea	Romantovich Take One	0	16					
7	United States	Margie Engle	Indigo	0	4					
7	United States	Rich Fellers	Flexible	12	4					
7	United States			8	24	32			7,000 €	2
8	Italy	Roberto Arioldi	Loro Piana Utile	9	5					
8	Italy	Lucia Vizzini	Quinta Roo	12	21					
8	Italy	Natale Chiaudani	Snai Corradio Oh	9	8					
8	Italy	Emilio Bicocchi	Kapitol D'Argonne	0	did not start					
8	Italy			18	34	52			5,000 €	0
9	Denmark	Andreas Schou	Unos Safier	1	3					
9	Denmark	Emilie Martinsen	Caballero	5	12					
9	Denmark	Charlotte Lund	Cartani	13	15					
9	Denmark	Thomas Sandgaard	Amarone	12	12					
9	Denmark			18	37	55			5,000 €	1

(grey penalties points do not count for the team result)

== Grand Prix “Città di Roma” ==
The Grand Prix “Città di Roma” was the major competition of the 2011 Piazza di Siena horse show. The sponsor of this competition was Loro Piana. It was held at Sunday, May 29, 2011 at 4:15 pm.

The competition was a show jumping competition with two rounds, the height of the fences was up to 1.60 meters. It is endowed with 200,000 €.

	Rider	Horse	Round 1	Round 2		prize money
	Rider	Horse	Penalties	Penalties	Time (s)	prize money
1	(Canada) Eric Lamaze	Hickstead	0	0	40.30	50,267 €
2	(United Kingdom) Michael Whitaker	Amai	0	0	41.17	40,267 €
3	(Netherlands) Jeroen Dubbeldam	Simon	0	0	42.30	30,267 €
4	(United Kingdom) Nick Skelton	Carlo	0	0	44.13	20,267 €
5	(France) Michel Robert	Kellemoi de Pepita	1	0	44.16	14,267 €
