= 2011 CSIO Schweiz =

The 2011 CSIO Schweiz (English: CSIO Switzerland) was the 2011 edition of the CSIO Schweiz, the Swiss official show jumping horse show, at Gründenmoos in St. Gallen. It was held as CSIO 5*.

The first horse show were held 1884 at St. Gallen. Up to the 1970s the CSIO Schweiz was held on year in Geneva and the next year in Lucerne. In the next years, up to 2006, the CSIO Schweiz was held one year in St. Gallen and in the outer year in Lucerne. Since 2007 each year the CSIO Schweiz are held in St. Gallen.

The 2011 edition of the CSIO Schweiz was held between June 2, 2011 and June 5, 2011.

== FEI Nations Cup of Switzerland ==
The 2011 FEI Nations Cup of Switzerland was part of the 2011 CSIO Schweiz. It was the third competition of the 2011 FEI Nations Cup and was held at Friday, June 3, 2011 at 1:30 pm. The competing teams were: the United States of America, Denmark, Germany, the Netherlands, Ireland, Belgium, France and Great Britain. Also a Swiss team as host nation had the chance to start in the competition.

The competition was a show jumping competition with two rounds and optionally one jump-off. The height of the fences were up to 1.60 meters. All teams were allowed to start in the second round. The competition is endowed with 200,000 €.

	Team	Rider	Horse	Round A	Round B	Total penalties	Jump-off		Prize money	scoring points
	Team	Rider	Horse	Penalties	Penalties	Total penalties	Penalties	Time (s)	Prize money	scoring points
1	Netherlands	Eric van der Vleuten	Utascha SFN	0	0					
1	Netherlands	Piet Raijmakers junior	Rascin	9	4					
1	Netherlands	Maikel van der Vleuten	Verdi	0	0					
1	Netherlands	Jur Vrieling	Bubalu	1	did not start					
1	Netherlands			1	4	5			64.000 €	10
2	Great Britain	Tim Stockdale	Kalico Bay	4	15					
2	Great Britain	Robert Smith	Talan	5	0					
2	Great Britain	Scott Brash	Intertoy Z	0	0					
2	Great Britain	Nick Skelton	Carlo	4	0					
2	Great Britain			8	0	8			36.000 €	7
2	Switzerland	Steve Guerdat	Jalisca Solier	0	0					
2	Switzerland	Werner Muff	Kiamon	4	0					
2	Switzerland	Janika Sprunger	Uptown Boy	5	8					
2	Switzerland	Pius Schwizer	Carlina	0	4					
2	Switzerland			4	4	8			36.000 €	-
4	United States	Charlie Jayne	Athena	4	12					
4	United States	Christine McCrea	Take One	0	0					
4	United States	Rich Fellers	Flexible	0	4					
4	United States	Margie Engle	Indigo	4	8					
4	United States			4	12	16			23.000 €	6
5	France	Kevin Staut	Kraque Boom	12	eliminated					
5	France	Simon Delestre	Napoli du Ry	8	4					
5	France	Pénélope Leprevost	Topinambour	0	4					
5	France	Olivier Guillon	Lord de Theize	0	4					
5	France			8	12	20			15.000 €	5
6	Belgium	Philippe Le Jeune	Vigo d’Arsouilles	0	4					
6	Belgium	Dirk Demeersman	Bufero van het Panishof	12	12					
6	Belgium	Rik Hemeryck	Challenge van de Begijnakker	5	4					
6	Belgium	Jos Lansink	Valentina van't Heike	8	1					
6	Belgium			13	9	22			10.000 €	4
7	Ireland	Alexander Butler	Amaretto D'Arco	4	23					
7	Ireland	Jennifer Crooks	Uryadi	8	4					
7	Ireland	Jessica Kürten	Largo	8	13					
7	Ireland	Shane Sweetnam	Amaretto D'Arco	5	1					
7	Ireland			17	18	35			7.000 €	3
8	Denmark	Andreas Schou	Uno's Safier	9	13					
8	Denmark	Emilie Martinsen	Caballero	21	0					
8	Denmark	Charlotte Lund	Cartani	13	9					
8	Denmark	Thomas Sandgaard	Amarone	5	9					
8	Denmark			27	18	45			5.000 €	2
9	Germany	Jörg Oppermann	Che Guevara	5	28					
9	Germany	Jan Sprehe	Paolini	5	eliminated					
9	Germany	Eva Bitter	Stakkato	4	did not start					
9	Germany	Holger Wulschner	Cefalo	4	did not start					
9	Germany			13	withdrawn				4.000 €	1

(grey penalties points do not count for the team result)

== Grosses Jagdspringen ==
The “Grosses Wegelin Jagdspringen” was the biggest competition on Saturday at the 2011 CSIO Schweiz. The sponsor of this competition is the Swiss bank company Wegelin & Co. It was held at Saturday, June 4, 2011 at 1:00 pm.

The competition was a speed and handiness show jumping competition (faults at fences will be converted into seconds; this seconds will be added to the time of the competitor). The height of the fences was up to 1.45 meters. It is endowed with 80,000 CHF.

	Rider	Horse	Time (s)	Penalties	Result	prize money
1	(United Kingdom) Ben Maher	Oscar IX	71.28	(0)	71.28 (71.28 + 0.00)	20,000 CHF
2	(United States) Rich Fellers	Mc Guinness	72.48	(0)	72.48 (72.48 + 0.00)	16,000 CHF
3	(Switzerland) Janika Sprunger	Komparse	73.35	(0)	73.35 (73.35 + 0.00)	12,000 CHF
4	(Switzerland) Steve Guerdat	Urgent	70.32	(4)	74.32 (70.32 + 4.00)	8,000 CHF
5	(Switzerland) Pius Schwizer	Ulysse	71.29	(4)	75.29 (71.29 + 4.00)	5,500 CHF

== Longines Grand Prix ==
The Longines Grand Prix was the mayor competition of the 2011 CSIO Schweiz. The sponsor of this competition is Longines. It was held at Sunday, June 5, 2011 at 1:40 pm.

The competition was a show jumping competition with two rounds, the height of the fences was up to 1.60 meters. It is endowed with 300,000 CHF. Because of a hailstorm the competition had to be interrupted for 45 minutes, much riders did not start. Ten riders had no faults in the first round, winner of the Grand Prix is a second time after 2006 Nick Skelton.

	Rider	Horse	Round 1	Round 2		prize money
	Rider	Horse	Penalties	Penalties	Time (s)	prize money
1	(United Kingdom) Nick Skelton	Carlo	0	0	43.58	75,000 CHF
2	(United States) Rich Fellers	Flexible	0	0	44.83	60,000 CHF
3	(United States) Christine McCrea	Take One	0	0	46.93	45,000 CHF
4	(France) Pénélope Leprevost	Mylord Carthago	0	0	48.53	30,000 CHF
5	(Republic of Ireland) Jessica Kürten	Lector	0	0	52.33	22,000 CHF
