= 2011 CHIO Rotterdam =

The 2011 CHIO Rotterdam was the 2011 edition of the CHIO Rotterdam, the Dutch official show jumping horse show. It was held as CSIO 5*.

The first (national) horse show was held 1937 in Rotterdam, and became an international horse show in 1938.

Former editions of the CHIO Rotterdam were held in June. In 2011, also the European Dressage Championship was held on the CHIO area. Because of this, the 2011 CHIO Rotterdam was held one week after the European Dressage Championship (August 25, 2011 and June 28, 2011) without dressage competitions. The main sponsor of the 2011 CHIO Rotterdam horse show was the Rabobank.

== FEI Nations Cup of the Netherlands ==
The 2011 FEI Nations Cup of the Netherlands was part of the 2011 CHIO Rotterdam. As a result of the late date of the 2011 CHIO the Dutch Nations Cup was - first time - the last competition of the 2011 Meydan FEI Nations Cup.

The 2011 FEI Nations Cup of the Netherlands was held at Friday, August 26, 2011, at 5:15 pm. The competing teams were: Germany, the Netherlands, Denmark, the United Kingdom (Great Britain), the United States of America, Ireland, Belgium and France.

The competition was a show jumping competition with two rounds and optionally one jump-off. The height of the fences were up to 1.60 meters.

The competition is endowed with 200,000 €.

	Team	Rider	Horse	Round A	Round B	Total penalties	Jump-off		Prize money	Scoring points
	Team	Rider	Horse	Penalties	Penalties	Total penalties	Penalties	Time (s)	Prize money	Scoring points
1	Germany	Marco Kutscher	Cornet Obolensky	0	1					
1	Germany	Thomas Voß	Carinjo	5	13					
1	Germany	Carsten-Otto Nagel	Corradina	0	0					
1	Germany	Marcus Ehning	Plot Blue	8	4		0	39.29		
1	Germany			5	5	10	0	39.29	€65,000	10
2	Great Britain	Michael Whitaker	Amai	9	1					
2	Great Britain	Guy Williams	Depardieu van't Kiezelhof	5	5					
2	Great Britain	Ben Maher	Tripple X III	0	0		4	39.79		
2	Great Britain	John Whitaker	Peppermill	4	0					
2	Great Britain			9	1	10	4	39.79	€42,000	7
3	France	Pénélope Leprevost	Mylord Carthago	4	4					
3	France	Kevin Staut	Silvana	5	8					
3	France	Olivier Guillon	Lord de Theize	0	0					
3	France	Michel Robert	Kellemoi de Pepita	4	4					
3	France			8	4	12			€32,000	6
4	Netherlands	Eric van der Vleuten	Utascha SFN	8	1					
4	Netherlands	Jur Vrieling	Bubalu	8	8					
4	Netherlands	Maikel van der Vleuten	Verdi	4	0					
4	Netherlands	Jeroen Dubbeldam	Simon	4	0					
4	Netherlands			16	1	17			€19,500	4.5
4	Belgium	Philippe Le Jeune	Vigo d'Arsouilles	4	8					
4	Belgium	Grégory Wathelet	Copin van de Broy	4	0					
4	Belgium	Nicola Philippaerts	Carlos	9	4					
4	Belgium	Jos Lansink	Valentina van't Heike	4	1					
4	Belgium			12	5	17			€19,500	4.5
6	United States	Lauren Hough	Quick Study	5	9					
6	United States	Christine McCrea	Take One	4	0					
6	United States	Laura Kraut	Cedric	0	10					
6	United States	Beezie Madden	Coral Reef Vio Volo	4	1					
6	United States			8	10	18			€10,000	3
7	Ireland	Niall Talbot	Nicos de la Cense	5	5					
7	Ireland	Alexander Butler	Will Wimble	eliminated	disqualified					
7	Ireland	Denis Lynch	Abbervail vh Dingeshof	5	6					
7	Ireland	Billy Twomey	Romanov	4	4					
7	Ireland			14	15	29			€7,000	2
8	Denmark	Andreas Schou	Uno's Safier	5	5					
8	Denmark	Camilla Enemark	Regino	10	1					
8	Denmark	Emilie Martinsen	Apollo	6	6					
8	Denmark	Torben Frandsen	Calvara Z	26	did not start					
8	Denmark			21	12	33			€5,000	1

(grey penalties points do not count for the team result)

== Longines Grand Prix Port of Rotterdam ==
The Grand Prix was the mayor show jumping competition of the 2011 CHIO Rotterdam. The sponsor of this competition was Longines. It was held at Sunday, August 28, 2011, at 2:30 pm. The competition was a show jumping competition with one round and one jump-off, the height of the fences were up to 1.60 meters.

	Rider	Horse	Round 1	jump-off		prize money
	Rider	Horse	Penalties	Penalties	Time (s)	prize money
1	(United States) Beezie Madden	Coral Reef Via Volo	0	0	38.31	€50,000
2	(Netherlands) Jeroen Dubbeldam	Simon	0	0	39.11	€40,000
3	(Germany) Carsten-Otto Nagel	Corradina	0	0	40.33	€30,000
4	(Japan) Taizo Sugitani	Avenzio	0	0	40.34	€20,000
5	(Republic of Ireland) Shane Breen	Carmena Z	0	4	38.46	€14,000

(Top 5 of 47 Competitors)
