= 2011 Jumping International de France =

The Jumping International de France 2011 was the 2011 edition of Jumping International de France, the French official show jumping horse show, in the Stadium François André in La Baule-Escoublac. It was held as CSIO 5*.

The first horse show were held 1931 in La Baule, since 1960 La Baule is the location of the French official show jumping horse show (CSIO = Concours de Saut International Officiel). The 2011 edition of Jumping International de France was held between May 12, 2011 and May 15, 2011.

== FEI Nations Cup of France ==
The 2011 FEI Nations Cup of France was part of the Jumping International de France 2011. It was the first competition of the 2011 FEI Nations Cup and was held at Friday, May 13, 2011 at 4:20 pm. The competing teams were: Germany, Great Britain, the United States of America, Belgium, Denmark, Ireland, France and the Netherlands.

The competition was a show jumping competition with two rounds and optionally one jump-off. The height of the fences were up to 1.60 meters. All teams were allowed to start in the second round. The competition was endowed with 200,000 €.

	Team	Rider	Horse	Round A	Round B	Total penalties	Jump-off		Prize money	scoring points
	Team	Rider	Horse	Penalties	Penalties	Total penalties	Penalties	Time (s)	Prize money	scoring points
1	Ireland	Shane Sweetnam	Amaretto Darco	1	4					
1	Ireland	Billy Twomey	Romanov II	4	4					
1	Ireland	Cian O'Connor	Larkhill Cruiser	4	0					
1	Ireland	Cameron Hanley	Southwind VDL	0	17					
1	Ireland			5	8	13			64,000 €	10
2	Belgium	Philippe Le Jeune	Vigo d’Arsouilles	0	7					
2	Belgium	Dirk Demeersman	Bufero van het Panishof	4	4					
2	Belgium	Judy-Ann Melchior	As Cold As Ice Z	0	0					
2	Belgium	Jos Lansink	Valentina	retired	8					
2	Belgium			4	11	15			40,000 €	7
3	Germany	Carsten-Otto Nagel	Corradina	4	4					
3	Germany	Philipp Weishaupt	Catoki	0	4					
3	Germany	Thomas Mühlbauer	Asti Spumante	9	8					
3	Germany	Marcus Ehning	Noltes Küchengirl	4	0					
3	Germany			8	8	16			32,000 €	6
4	Great Britain	Nick Skelton	Carlo	0	4					
4	Great Britain	David McPherson	Chamberlain Z	4	eliminated					
4	Great Britain	Robert Smith	Talan	1	4					
4	Great Britain	Peter Charles	Nevada VI	5	5					
4	Great Britain			5	13	18			24,000 €	5
5	Netherlands	Vincent Voorn	Alpapillon Armanie	0	16					
5	Netherlands	Eric van der Vleuten	Utascha SFN	8	0					
5	Netherlands	Jur Vrieling	Bubalu	0	4					
5	Netherlands	Marc Houtzager	Opium	9	8					
5	Netherlands			8	13	20			13,500 €	3.5
5	United States	Charlie Jayne	Athena	8	4					
5	United States	Ashlee Bond	Cadett	12	4					
5	United States	Margie Engle	Indigo	4	0					
5	United States	Rich Fellers	Flexible	0	4					
5	United States			12	8	20			13,500 €	3.5
7	France	Penelope Leprevost	Topinambour	1	4					
7	France	Simon Delestre	Napoli du Ry	0	4					
7	France	Michel Robert	Kellemoi de Pepita	8	5					
7	France	Kevin Staut	Silvana	eliminated	retired					
7	France			9	13	22			8,000 €	2
8	Denmark	Torben Frandsen	Alcamo Vogt	12	retired					
8	Denmark	Emilie Martinsen	Caballero	did not start	did not start					
8	Denmark	Thomas Sandgaard	Rubber Ball	9	did not start					
8	Denmark	Henrik Gundersen	Apollo	12	did not start					
8	Denmark			33	retired				5,000 €	1

(grey penalties points do not count for the team result)

== Grand Prix Longines de la ville de la Baule ==
The Grand Prix de la ville de la Baule was the mayor competition of the Jumping International de France 2011. It was held at Sunday, May 15, 2011 at 11:45 am. The competition was a show jumping competition with one round and one jump-off, the height of the fences will be up to 1.60 meters.

The main sponsor of the Grand Prix de la ville de la Baule was Longines. The Grand Prix was endowed with 200,000 €.

	Rider	Horse	Round 1		Jump-off		prize money
	Rider	Horse	Penalties	Time (s)	Penalties	Time (s)	prize money
1	(Canada) Eric Lamaze	Hickstead	0	74.07	0	37.22	66,000 €
2	(France) Pénélope Leprevost	Mylord Carthago	0	76.24	0	37.45	40,000 €
3	(Germany) Carsten-Otto Nagel	Corradina	0	75.84	0	38.19	28,000 €
4	(Belgium) Philippe Le Jeune	Vigo d’Arsouilles	0	75.90	0	39.34	20,000 €
5	(France) Michel Robert	Kellemoi de Pepita	0	75.62	0	41.31	12,000 €

(Top 5 of 46 Competitors)
