= 2011 Royal International Horse Show =

The 2011 Longines Royal International Horse Show was the 2011 edition of the Royal International Horse Show, the British official show jumping horse show at All England Jumping Course at Hickstead. It was held as CSIO 5* and CDI 5*.

The 2011 edition of the Royal International Horse Show was held between 28 and 31 July 2011.

== FEI Nations Cup of the United Kingdom ==
The 2011 FEI Nations Cup of the United Kingdom was part of the 2011 Royal International Horse Show. It was the seventh competition of the 2011 Meydan FEI Nations Cup.

The 2011 FEI Nations Cup of the United Kingdom was held on Friday 29 July 2011 at 2:15 pm. The competing teams were: France, Great Britain, the Netherlands, Ireland, Belgium, Denmark, Germany and the United States of America.

The competition was a show jumping competition with two rounds and optionally one jump-off. The height of the fences were up to 1.60 meters. The competition was endowed with 200,000 €.

	Team	Rider	Horse	Round A	Round B	Total penalties	Jump-off		Prize money	Scoring points
	Team	Rider	Horse	Penalties	Penalties	Total penalties	Penalties	Time (s)	Prize money	Scoring points
1	Germany	Janne Friederike Meyer	Lambrasco	0	8					
1	Germany	Holger Wulschner	Cefalo	8	8					
1	Germany	Philipp Weishaupt	Catoki	4	14					
1	Germany	Marcus Ehning	Plot Blue	0	0		0	44.95		
1	Germany			4	16	20	0	44.95	64,000 €	10
2	France	Olivier Guillon	Lord de Theize	0	4					
2	France	Roger-Yves Bost	Nifrane de Kreisker	0	8					
2	France	Pénélope Leprevost	Topinambour	4	4					
2	France	Kevin Staut	Silvana	4	retired		0	45.98		
2	France			8	12	20	0	45.98	40,000 €	7
3	United States	Christine McCrea	Take One	0	4					
3	United States	Kent Farrington	Uceko	4	8					
3	United States	Laura Kraut	Teirra	12	16					
3	United States	Beezie Madden	Coral Reef Vio Volo	4	0		4	44.43		
3	United States			8	12	20	4	44.43	32,000 €	6
4	Great Britain	Guy Williams	Titus	8	4					
4	Great Britain	Robert Smith	Talan	4	8					
4	Great Britain	Peter Charles	Nevada	12	4					
4	Great Britain	Michael Whitaker	Amai	4	0					
4	Great Britain			16	8	24			24,000 €	5
5	Belgium	Jos Lansink	Valentina van't Heike	8	0					
5	Belgium	Dirk Demeersman	Bufero van het Panishof	8	0					
5	Belgium	Patrik Spits	Cadjanine Z	8	16					
5	Belgium	Olivier Philippaerts	Cabrio van de Heffinck	4	8					
5	Belgium			20	8	28			16,000 €	4
6	Ireland	Shane Breen	Cos I Can	8	12					
6	Ireland	Jennifer Crooks	Uryadi	0	16					
6	Ireland	Billy Twomey	Romanov	8	16					
6	Ireland	Denis Lynch	Nabab's Son	4	4					
6	Ireland			12	32	44			9,500 €	2,5
6	Netherlands	Leon Thijssen	Tyson	16	0					
6	Netherlands	Piet Raijmakers jr.	Rascin	8	8					
6	Netherlands	Gert Jan Bruggink	Wings	12	12					
6	Netherlands	Wout-Jan van der Schans	Seoul	4	12					
6	Netherlands			24	20	44			9,500 €	2,5
8	Denmark	Christian Schou	Coronada	16	9					
8	Denmark	Emilie Martinsen	Apollo	4	16					
8	Denmark	Cecilie Tofte	Udessa	16	12					
8	Denmark	Tina Lund	Zamiro	retired	did not start					
8	Denmark			36	33	69			5,000 €	1

(grey penalties points do not count for the team result)

== Grand Prix Spécial (B-Final) ==
The 2011 Royal International Horse Show was the venue of the third competition of the World Dressage Masters (WDM) - rider ranking, season 2011/2012.

All competitors started first in the Grand Prix de Dressage at Saturday. The eight best-placed competitors of the Grand Prix de Dressage were allowed to start in the A-Final (the Grand Prix Freestyle). It some of best-placed competitors wanted to start in the B-Final, the same number of competitors, who were placed after the best-placed competitors, moved up in the A-Final.

The B-Final of the World Dressage Masters competitions at 2011 Royal International Horse Show was held on Sunday 31 July 2011. It was endowed with 20,000 €. The B-Final was held as Grand Prix Spécial, the competition with the highest definite level of dressage competitions.

	Rider	Horse	Score
1	(United Kingdom) Charlotte Dujardin	Valegro	76.604%
2	(Netherlands) Leida Collins-Strijk	On Top	70.479 %
3	(Netherlands) Sander Marijnissen	Moedwil	69.813 %

(top 3 of 12 competitors)

== Grand Prix Freestyle (A-Final) ==
The Grand Prix Freestyle (or Grand Prix Kür) was the A-Final of the World Dressage Masters competitions at 2011 Royal International Horse Show (see also Grand Prix Spécial).

A Grand Prix Freestyle was a Freestyle dressage competition. The level of this competition was at least the level of a Grand Prix de Dressage, but it can be higher than the level of a Grand Prix Spécial.

The Grand Prix Freestyle at 2011 Royal International Horse Show was held on Sunday 31 July 2011 after the Grand Prix Spécial. It was endowed with 70,000 €.

	Rider	Horse	Score
1	(Netherlands) Adelinde Cornelissen	Parzival	84.925 %
2	(United Kingdom) Carl Hester	Uthopia	81.800 %
3	(United Kingdom) Emma Hindle	Lancet	77.350 %
4	(Netherlands) Jenny Schreven	Krawall	73.525 %
5	(Canada) Ashley Holzer	Pop Art	73.425 %

(top 3 of 8 competitors)

== The Longines King Georges V Gold Cup ==
The King Georges V Gold Cup, the Show jumping Grand Prix of the 2011 Royal International Horse Show, was the major show jumping competition at this event. The sponsor of this competition was Longines. It was held on Sunday 31 July 2011. The competition was a show jumping competition with one round and one jump-off, the height of the fences were up to 1.60 meters.

It is endowed with 200,000 €.

	Rider	Horse	Round 1	jump-off		prize money
	Rider	Horse	Penalties	Penalties	Time (s)	prize money
1	(United States) Kent Farrington	Uceko	0	0	54.36	64,000 €
2	(United Kingdom) Robert Smith	Talan	0	0	54.80	40,000 €
3	(Netherlands) Leon Thijssen	Tyson	0	0	54.96	32,000 €
4	(United Kingdom) Tim Stockdale	Kalico Bay	0	0	56.73	24,000 €
5	(Germany) Hans-Dieter Dreher	Magnus Romeo	0	0	56.78	14,000 €

(Top 5 of 46 Competitors)
