= 2011 Falsterbo Horse Show =

Show jumping competition in Sweden

The 2011 Falsterbo Horse Show was the 2011 edition of the Falsterbo Horse Show, the Swedish official show jumping horse show. It was held as CSIO 5* and CDI 5*.

The first horse show were held 1920 in Falsterbo, in 1969 the first show jumping derby was held here.

The 2011 edition of the Falsterbo Horse Show was held July 7–10, 2011.

== FEI Nations Cup of Sweden ==
The 2011 FEI Nations Cup of Sweden was part of the 2011 Falsterbo Horse Show. It was the fourth competition of the 2011 Meydan FEI Nations Cup and was held on Friday, July 8, 2011 at 2:30 pm. The competing teams were: the United States of America, Belgium, the Netherlands, Germany, Great Britain, Ireland, Denmark and France. Also a Swedish team as host nation had the chance to start in the competition.

The competition was a show jumping competition with two rounds and optionally one jump-off. The height of the fences were up to 1.60 meters (5 ft 3 in).

The competition is endowed with 200,000 €.

	Team	Rider	Horse	Round A	Round B	Total penalties	Jump-off		Prize money	scoring points
	Team	Rider	Horse	Penalties	Penalties	Total penalties	Penalties	Time (s)	Prize money	scoring points
1	Germany	Marco Kutscher	Cash	0	0					
1	Germany	Thomas Voß	Carinjo	15	4					
1	Germany	Carsten-Otto Nagel	Corradina	4	0					
1	Germany	Ludger Beerbaum	Gotha FRH	0	did not start					
1	Germany			4	4	8			64,000 €	10
2	France	Pénélope Leprevost	Topinambour	4	8					
2	France	Simon Delestre	Napoli du Ry	4	0					
2	France	Kevin Staut	Silvana	4	0					
2	France	Michel Robert	Kellemoi de Pepita	4	0					
2	France			12	0	12			36,000 €	7
2	Sweden	Malin Baryard-Johnsson	Tornesch	4	0					
2	Sweden	Angelica Augustsson	Mic Mac du Tillard	0	8					
2	Sweden	Peder Fredricson	Arctic Aurora Borealis	8	10					
2	Sweden	Rolf-Göran Bengtsson	Ninja	0	0					
2	Sweden			4	8	12			36,000 €	(Note: host nation, no regular participant at the 2011 FEI Nations Cup)
4	Netherlands	Piet Raijmakers jun.	Rascin	0	0					
4	Netherlands	Maikel van der Vleuten	Verdi	1	0					
4	Netherlands	Albert Zoer	Sam	16	8					
4	Netherlands	Leon Thijssen	Tyson	12	0					
4	Netherlands			13	0	13			23,000 €	6
5	Ireland	Shane Breen	Cos I Can	4	4					
5	Ireland	Denis Lynch	Lord Luis	0	8					
5	Ireland	Nicola Fitzgibbon	Puissance	4	0					
5	Ireland	Cian O'Connor	Splendor	4	4					
5	Ireland			8	8	16			15,000 €	5
6	United States	Charlie Jayne	Athena	8	0					
6	United States	Saer Coulter	Springtime	8	4					
6	United States	Lucy Davis	Nemo	7	4					
6	United States	Christine McCrea	Take One	0	8					
6	United States			15	8	23			10,000 €	4
7	Great Britain	Tim Stockdale	Kalico Bay	19	did not start					
7	Great Britain	Robert Whitaker	USA Today	4	4					
7	Great Britain	Bruce Menzies	Sultan V	4	4					
7	Great Britain	Peter Charles	Nevada	8	4					
7	Great Britain			16	12	28			7,000 €	3
8	Belgium	Niels Bruynseels	Nasa	12	8					
8	Belgium	Patrick Spits	Cadjanine Z	4	8					
8	Belgium	Jérôme Guery	Waldo	4	8					
8	Belgium	Jan Vinckier	Ursela	34	eliminated					
8	Belgium			27	20	47			5,000 €	2
9	Denmark	Torben Frandsen	Alcamo Vogt	5	4					
9	Denmark	Andreas Schou	Coronada	12	12					
9	Denmark	Tina Lund	Qrispy D Ive Z	8	retired					
9	Denmark	Thomas Velin	Godsend du Reverdy	retired	8					
9	Denmark			25	24	49			4,000 €	1

(grey penalties points do not count for the team result)

== Grand Prix Freestyle (A-Final) ==
The 2011 Falsterbo Horse Show was the venue of the first competition of the World Dressage Masters (WDM) – rider ranking, season 2011/2012.

All competitors has started first in the Grand Prix de Dressage at Friday. The eight best-placed competitors of the Grand Prix de Dressage were allowed to start in the A-Final (the Grand Prix Freestyle). It some of best-placed competitors had want to start in the B-Final, the same number of competitors, who are placed after the best-placed competitors, had move up in the A-Final.

The Grand Prix Freestyle, the A-Final of the World Dressage Masters, is a Freestyle dressage competition. The level of this competition is at least the level of a Grand Prix de Dressage, but it can be higher than the level of a Grand Prix Spécial.

The Grand Prix Freestyle at the 2011 Falsterbo Horse Show was held on Saturday, July 9, 2011 at 1:00 pm. It is endowed with 60,000 €.

	Rider	Horse	Score
1	(Sweden) Patrik Kittel	Scandic	82.775 %
2	(Netherlands) Anky van Grunsven	Salinero	76.925 %
3	(Sweden) Tinne Vilhelmson-Silfven	Don Auriello	75.875 %
4	(Germany) Anja Plönzke	Le Mont d'Or	75.050 %
5	(United States) Catherine Haddad	Winyamaro	71.375 %

(top 5 of 8 competitors)

== JMS Falsterbo Derby ==
The Falsterbo Derby was an important show jumping competition at the 2011 Falsterbo Horse Show. The sponsor of this competition is JMS. A Derby is a show jumping competition with special fences like walls or natural fences build of wood (another example of a derby competition in show jumping is the British Jumping Derby).

This competition was held on Saturday, July 9, 2011 at 3:45 pm. The competition was a show jumping competition with one round and one jump-off.

	Rider	Horse	Round 1		jump-off		prize money
	Rider	Horse	Penalties	Time (s)	Penalties	Time (s)	prize money
1	(France) Patrice Delaveau	Ornella Mail	0	-	0	52.47	19,000 €
2	(Republic of Ireland) Shane Breen	Mullaghdrin Gold Rain	0	-	retired		14,000 €
3	(Sweden) Erika Lickhammer	Hip Hop	4	163.64			6,000 €
4	(Belgium) Pieter Devos	Dorenta	4	173.59			5,000 €
5	(Sweden) Jens Fredricson	Lunatic	4	177.02			4,000 €

(Top 5 of 20 Competitors)

== Grand Prix Spécial (B-Final) ==
The Grand Prix Spécial was the B-Final of the World Dressage Masters competitions at 2011 Falsterbo Horse Show (see also Grand Prix Freestyle).

The B-Final of the World Dressage Masters competitions at 2011 Falsterbo Horse Show was held on July 9, 2011 at 4:00 pm. It was endowed with 30,000 €. The B-Final was held as Grand Prix Spécial, the competition with the highest definite level of dressage competitions.

	Rider	Horse	Score
1	(Poland) Michal Rapcewicz	Randon	67.563 %
2	(Netherlands) Jenny Schreven	Krawall	67.021 %
3	(Norway) Siril Helljesen	Dorina	66.729 %

(top 3 of 7 competitors)

== Longines Falsterbo Grand Prix ==
The Grand Prix was the mayor show jumping competition of the 2011 Falsterbo Horse Show. The sponsor of this competition was Longines. It was held on Sunday, July 10, 2011 at 3:00 pm. The competition was a show jumping competition with two rounds, the height of the fences were up to 1.60 meters.

	Rider	Horse	Round 1	jump-off		prize money
	Rider	Horse	Penalties	Penalties	Time (s)	prize money
1	(France) Patrice Delaveau	Orient Express	0	0	43.13	64,000 €
2	(Sweden) Angelica Augustsson	Mic Mac du Tillard	0	0	44.72	40,000 €
3	(Netherlands) Maikel van der Vleuten	Verdi	0	0	46.97	32,000 €
4	(Saudi Arabia) Ramzy Al Duhami	Bayard van de Villa Theresia	0	0	48.97	21,000 €
5	(United Kingdom) Nicola Fitzgibbon	Puissance	0	0	49.83	14,000 €

(Top 5 of 44 Competitors)
