= 2010 CSIO Gijón =

Show jumping event in Gijón, Spain

The 2010 CSIO Gijón was the 2010 edition of the Spanish official show jumping horse show, at Las Mestas Sports Complex in Gijón. It was held as CSIO 5*.

This edition of the CSIO Gijón was held between August 31 and September 5.

== Nations Cup ==
The 2010 FEI Nations Cup of Spain was the fifth competition of the 2011 FEI Nations Cup Promotional League and was held on Saturday, September 3, 2010.

The competition was a show jumping competition with two rounds. The height of the fences were up to 1.60 meters. The best six teams of the eleven which participated were allowed to start in the second round. As host team, Spain was allowed to participate in the second round despite finishing in the eighth place after the first round.

The competition was endowed with €61,500.

	Team	Rider	Horse	Round A	Round B	Total penalties	Jump-off		Prize money €	scoring points
	Team	Rider	Horse	Penalties	Penalties	Total penalties	Penalties	Time (s)	Prize money €	scoring points
1	Belgium	Pieter Devos	Utopia van de Donkhoeve	0	8					
1	Belgium	Judy-Ann Melchior	Cha Cha Z	4	0					
1	Belgium	Dirk Demeersman	Bufero van het Panishof	8	0					
1	Belgium	Philippe Le Jeune	Boyante de Muze	0	did not start					
1	Belgium			4	8	12			20,000 €	12
2	Great Britain	David McPherson	Chamberlain Z	4	0					
2	Great Britain	Scott Brash	Intertoy Z	0	4					
2	Great Britain	Robert Bevis	Courtney	8	8					
2	Great Britain	Tim Stockdale	Kalico Bay	4	4					
2	Great Britain			8	8	16			10,000 €	-
2	France	Kevin Staut	Silvana	0	0					
2	France	Julien Épaillard	Mister Davier	12	4					
2	France	Marie Pellegrin-Etter	Admirable	0	8					
2	France	Pénélope Leprevost	Topinambour	eliminated	did not start					
2	France			12	4	16			10,000 €	-
2	Canada	Ian Millar	Star Power	0	4					
2	Canada	Jenna Thompson	Zeke	4	8					
2	Canada	Keean White	Celena Z	12	8					
2	Canada	Eric Lamaze	Atlete van't Heike	0	0					
2	Canada			4	12	16			10,000 €	-
5	Ireland	Shane Breen	Carmena Z	8	0					
5	Ireland	Captain David O'Brien	Mo Chroi	0	8					
5	Ireland	Cian O'Connor	Splendor	8	0					
5	Ireland	Dermott Lennon	Hallmark Elite	4	8					
5	Ireland			12	8	20			5,000 €	-
5	Saudi Arabia	Abdullah Al-Sharbatly	Seldana di Campalto	8	4					
5	Saudi Arabia	Ramzy Al-Duhami	Jalla de Gaverie	0	8					
5	Saudi Arabia	Khaled Al-Eid	Presley Boy	0	0					
5	Saudi Arabia	Kamal Bahamdan	Cézanne	retired	9					
5	Saudi Arabia			8	12	20			5,000 €	-
7	Spain	Sergio Álvarez Moya	Wisconsin 111	8	16					
7	Spain	Manuel Añón	Acantus GK	4	4					
7	Spain	Julio Arias	Victory HK Hazelarenhoekj	4	8					
7	Spain	Ricardo Jurado	Julia des Brumes	12	12					
7	Spain			16	24	40				-
8	Netherlands	Vincent Voorn	Audi's Alpapillon-Armanie	8						
8	Netherlands	Aniek Poels	Asteria 2	4						
8	Netherlands	Mathijs van Asten	VDL Groep Chester Z	12						
8	Netherlands	Leon Thijssen	Tyson	0						
8	Netherlands			12						-
9	Germany	Thomas Mühlbauer	Asti Spumante 7	12						
9	Germany	Tobias Meyer	Annabell III	4						
9	Germany	Holger Wulschner	Abke 4	4						
9	Germany	Felix Haßmann	Horse Gym's Lianos	eliminated						
9	Germany			20						-
10	Norway	Stein Endresen	Hoyo de Monterrey	16						
10	Norway	Geir Gulliksen	L'Espoir	11						
10	Norway	Nina Braaten	Blue Loyd 12	12						
10	Norway	Morten Djupvik	Bessemeind's Casino	8						
10	Norway			31						-
11	Italy	Gabriele Grassi	American Blu van Eeklelchem	8						
11	Italy	Roberto Cristofoletti	Argent	12						
11	Italy	Fabio Brotto	R-Gitana	12						
11	Italy	Gianni Govoni	Aboyeur W	retired						
11	Italy			32						-

Grey penalties points do not count for the team result.

== Gijón Grand Prix ==
The Gijón Grand Prix, the Show jumping Grand Prix of the 2010 CSIO Gijón, was the major show jumping competition at this event. It was held on Monday 5 September 2010. The competition was a show jumping competition over two rounds, the height of the fences were up to 1.60 meters.

It was endowed with 125,000 €.

	Rider	Horse	Round 1	Round 2		Total penalties	prize money
	Rider	Horse	Penalties	Penalties	Time (s)	Total penalties	prize money
1	(Saudi Arabia) Khaled Al-Eid	Presley Boy	0	0	60.00	0	41,500 €
2	(France) Kevin Staut	Silvana HDC	0	0	60.87	0	28,500 €
3	(Canada) Ian Millar	Star Power	0	1	74.21	1	18,000 €
4	(France) Julien Épaillard	Mister Davier	0	4	61.49	4	12,000 €
5	(United States) Lauren Hough	Quick Study	4	0	62.48	4	8,000 €
6	(Republic of Ireland) Cian O'Connor	K Club Lady	5	2	76.18	7	5,000 €
7	(Spain) Jesús Garmendia	Lord du Mont Milon	4	4	59.93	8	4,000 €
8	(United States) Laura Kraut	Unique	4	4	60.29	8	3,000 €
9	(Saudi Arabia) Abdullah Al-Sharbatly	Seldana di Campalto	4	4	64.26	8	1,250 €
10	(Spain) Sergio Álvarez Moya	Wisconsin 111	4	4	65.01	8	1,250 €

(Top 10 of 45 Competitors)
