= 2011 Dublin Horse Show =

Show jumping competition

The 2011 Dublin Horse Show was that year's edition of the Dublin Horse Show, the Irish official show jumping competition at Dublin. It was held as CSIO 5*. The main sponsor was Discover Ireland.

The first horse show was held in 1864 in Dublin by the Royal Agricultural Society of Ireland. Since 1868 it is held by the Royal Dublin Society. In 1926 International Competitions were introduced to this horse show for the first time, it was also the first year the Aga Khan Trophy was held.

The 2011 edition of the Discover Ireland Dublin Horse Show was held between 3 August 2011 and 7 August 2011.

== FEI Nations Cup of Ireland ==
The 2011 FEI Nations Cup of Ireland was part of the 2011 Dublin Horse Show. It was the seventh competition of the 2011 Meydan FEI Nations Cup of Ireland. The Nations Cup of Ireland was held on Friday, 5 August 2011 at 2:55 pm. The competing teams will be: France, Great Britain, the Netherlands, Ireland, Belgium, Denmark, Germany and the United States of America.

The competition was a show jumping competition with two rounds and optionally one jump-off. The fences were up to 1.60 metres high. The competition is endowed with €200,000.

	Team	Rider	Horse	Round A	Round B	Total penalties	Jump-off		Prize money	Scoring points
	Team	Rider	Horse	Penalties	Penalties	Total penalties	Penalties	Time (s)	Prize money	Scoring points
1	Great Britain	Nick Skelton	Carlo	0	0		0	39.98		
1	Great Britain	Michael Whitaker	Amai	4	0					
1	Great Britain	Scott Brash	Intertoy Z	12	4					
1	Great Britain	Robert Smith	Talan	4	0					
1	Great Britain			8	0	8	0	39.98	64,000 €	10
2	Ireland	Billy Twomey	Tinka's Serenade	0	retired		retired			
2	Ireland	Shane Sweetnam	Amaretto D'Arco	0	0					
2	Ireland	Nicola Fitzgibbon	Puissance	4	0					
2	Ireland	Denis Lynch	All Inclusive NRW	5	4					
2	Ireland			4	4	8	retired		40,000 €	7
3	Belgium	Philippe Le Jeune	Vigo d'Arsouilles	0	0					
3	Belgium	Jos Lansink	Valentina van't Heike	4	0					
3	Belgium	Grégory Wathelet	Copin van de Broy	4	4					
3	Belgium	Dirk Demeersman	Bufero van het Panishof	retired	8					
3	Belgium			8	4	12			28,000 €	5.5
3	France	Pénélope Leprevost	Mylord Carthago	0	4					
3	France	Patrice Delaveau	Orient Express	0	4					
3	France	Roger-Yves Bost	Nippon d'Elle	4	4					
3	France	Michel Robert	Kellemoi de Pepita	0	4					
3	France			0	12	12			28,000 €	5.5
5	United States	Christine McCrea	Take One	8	4					
5	United States	Lauren Hough	Quick Study	0	10					
5	United States	Laura Kraut	Cedric	8	0					
5	United States	Beezie Madden	Coral Reef Vio Volo	4	0					
5	United States			12	4	16			16,000 €	4
6	Germany	Philipp Weishaupt	Monte Bellini	8	8					
6	Germany	Hans-Dieter Dreher	Magnus Romeo	4	12					
6	Germany	Holger Wulschner	Cefalo	4	0					
6	Germany	Rene Tebbel	Chevignon	0	8					
6	Germany			8	16	24			11,000 €	3
7	Netherlands	Leon Thijssen	Tyson	4	4					
7	Netherlands	Piet Raijmakers junior	Rascin	1	4					
7	Netherlands	Leopold van Asten	Santana B	12	4					
7	Netherlands	Wout-Jan van der Schans	Seoul	12	0					
7	Netherlands			17	8	25			8,000 €	2
8	Denmark	Christian Schou	Coronada	8	4					
8	Denmark	Cecilie Tofte	Udessa	21	retired					
8	Denmark	Emilie Martinsen	Apollo	8	8					
8	Denmark	Camilla Enemark	Regino	12	0					
8	Denmark			28	12	40			5,000 €	1

(grey penalty points do not count for the team result)

== Land Rover Puissance ==
The Puissance at 2011 Dublin Horse Show was the main show jumping competition on Saturday, 6 August 2011 at the 2011 Dublin Horse Show. It was held at 6:05 pm.

The competition was held as Puissance competition with one round and up to four jump-offs. It was endowed with £36,000, the sponsor of this competition is Land Rover.

	Rider	Horse	Penalties	prize money
1	(Germany) Rene Tebbel	Mats' Up du Plessis	0 penalties in 2nd jump-off	12,000 €
2	(Republic of Ireland) Ger O'Neill	High Flyer	4 penalties in 2nd jump-off	3,766 €
2	(Republic of Ireland) Jordan Coyle	Sir Luc	4 penalties in 2nd jump-off	3,766 €
2	(Republic of Ireland) Cian O'Connor	On Ira	4 penalties in 2nd jump-off	3,766 €
2	(Republic of Ireland) Greg Broderick	Corofelio	4 penalties in 2nd jump-off	3,766 €
2	(Republic of Ireland) Conor Swail	Vicar	4 penalties in 2nd jump-off	3,766 €
2	(Republic of Ireland) Alex Duffy	Mountain King	4 penalties in 2nd jump-off	3,766 €

(Top 7 of 14 Competitors)

== The Longines International Grand Prix of Ireland ==
The International Grand Prix of Ireland, the Show jumping Grand Prix of the 2011 Dublin Horse Show, was the major show jumping competition at this event. The sponsor of this competition is Longines. It was held on Sunday, 7 August 2011 at 3:00 pm. The competition was a show jumping competition with two rounds, the fences were up to 1.60 meters high.

It was endowed with 200,000 €.

	Rider	Horse	Penalties			Time	prize money
	Rider	Horse	Round 1	Round 2	Total	Round 2 (s)	prize money
1	(United States) Lauren Hough	Quick Study	0	0	0	59.95	66,500 €
2	(France) Michel Robert	Kellemoi de Pepita	0	0	0	63.02	42,000 €
3	(France) Pénélope Leprevost	Mylord Carthago	4	0	4	55.16	26,000 €
4	(United Kingdom) Michael Whitaker	Amai	4	0	4	55.38	20,000 €
5	(Belgium) Nicola Philippaerts	Carlos V.H.P.Z	4	0	4	57.93	14,500 €

(Top 5 of 40 Competitors)
