= Voyeur (horse) =

Show jumping horse

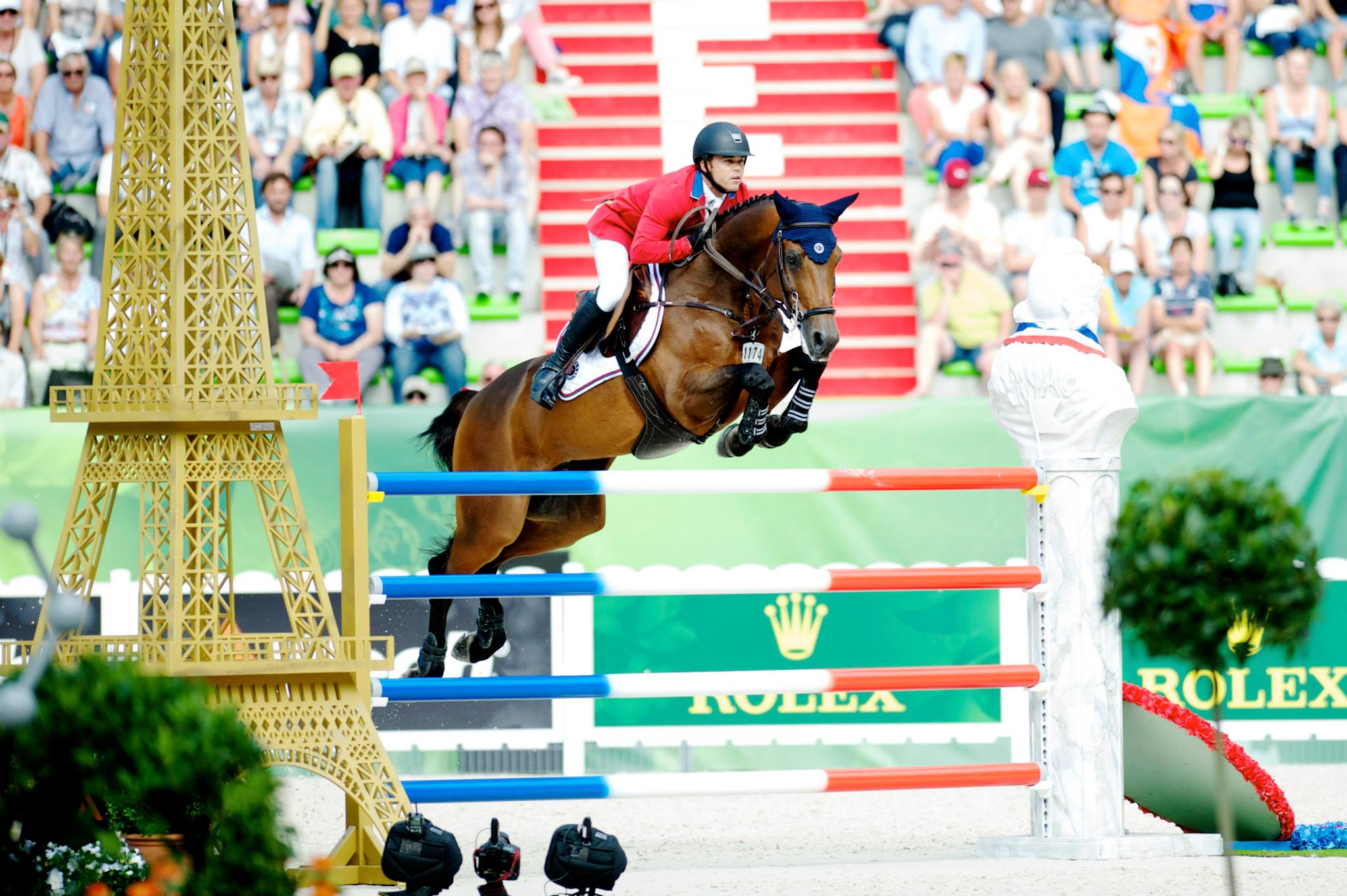
- Voyeur at the World Equestrian Games
- Breed: Dutch Warmblood
- Discipline: Show jumping
- Sex: Gelding
- Foaled: 2002
- Color: Bay

Voyeur (foaled 2002) is a horse ridden in show jumping by U.S. Olympic team member Kent Farrington. He is owned by Amalaya Investments.

== Life and accomplishments ==
Voyeur is a 2002 Dutch Warmblood gelding by Tolano van’t Riethof out of Goodwill.

In 2015, Farrington and Voyeur become the first pair from the U.S. to win the Rolex International Jumping Riders Club Club Rolex Top Ten Final. The pair also won the Longines World Cup in 2015. Voyeur placed first in the Pan American Cup presented by Rolex at Spruce Meadows in July 2015.

In July 2014, Voyeur was awarded the Halla Challenge Trophy in Aachen which is awarded to the best horse of the show, honoring Hans Günter Winkler who has won seven total Olympic medals and is the only equestrian to compete in and medal in six Olympic games. Also in 2014, Voyeur and Farrington won the ATCO Power Queen Elizabeth II Cup. Farrington rode Voyeur to a Bronze finish for the U.S. Team at the FEI World Team Jumping Championship during the Alltech FEI World Equestrian Games.
