= 2011 FEI Nations Cup =

International sporting event

The 2011 FEI Nations Cup was the 2011 edition of the FEI Nations Cup, a premier international team Grand Prix show jumping competition run by the FEI. It was held at eight European venues from May 13 to August 26, 2011.

== 2011 show schedule ==
Date	Show	Winning team
May 13, 2011	2011 Jumping International de France; La Baule, France; CSIO***** €200,000	Ireland
May 27, 2011	2011 Piazza di Siena (Italy) Rome, Italy; CSIO***** €200,000	Netherlands
June 3, 2011	2011 CSIO Schweiz (Switzerland) St. Gallen, Switzerland; CSIO***** €200,000	Netherlands
July 8, 2011	2011 Falsterbo Horse Show (Sweden) Skanör med Falsterbo, Sweden; CSIO***** €200,000	Germany
July 14, 2011	2011 CHIO Aachen (Germany) Aachen, Germany; CSIO***** €220,000	Netherlands
July 29, 2011	2011 Royal International Horse Show (United Kingdom) Hickstead, United Kingdom; CSIO***** €200,000	Germany
August 5, 2011	2011 Dublin Horse Show (Republic of Ireland) Dublin, Ireland; CSIO***** €200,000	Great Britain
August 26, 2011	2011 CHIO Rotterdam (Netherlands) Rotterdam, Netherlands; CSIO***** €200,000	Germany

== Standings ==
At the end of the season, the two teams with the lowest points were relegated to the 2012 FEI Nations Cup Promotional League. After the CSIO Dublin it was sure that the team of Denmark will be relegated. At the CSIO Rotterdam the teams of France, Belgium and the United States had fight against the relegation. At the end the United States was relegated.

	Team	Points								Total
	Team	FRA (France)	ITA (Italy)	SUI (Switzerland)	SWE (Sweden)	GER (Germany)	GBR (United Kingdom)	IRL (Republic of Ireland)	NED (Netherlands)	Total
1	Germany	6	4	1	10	6	10	3	10	50
2	Netherlands	3.5	10	10	6	10	2.5	2	4.5	48.5
3	Great Britain	5	4	7	3	6	5	10	7	47
4	Ireland	10	6	3	5	6	2.5	7	2	41.5
5	France	2	4	5	7	4	7	5.5	6	40.5
6	Belgium	7	7	4	2	1	4	5.5	4.5	35
7	United States	3.5	2	6	4	3	6	4	3	31.5
8	Denmark	1	1	2	1	2	1	1	1	10

Final standings
