= Steven Smith (equestrian) =

British equestrian (born 1962)

Medal record

Equestrian

Representing Great Britain

Olympic Games
Silver medal – second place	1984 Los Angeles	Team jumping

Steven Smith (born 22 October 1962) is a British equestrian and Olympic medalist. He was born in Bingley, a son of Harvey Smith, and brother of Robert Smith. He competed in show jumping at the 1984 Summer Olympics in Los Angeles, and won a silver medal with the British team.
