= Falsterbo Horse Show =

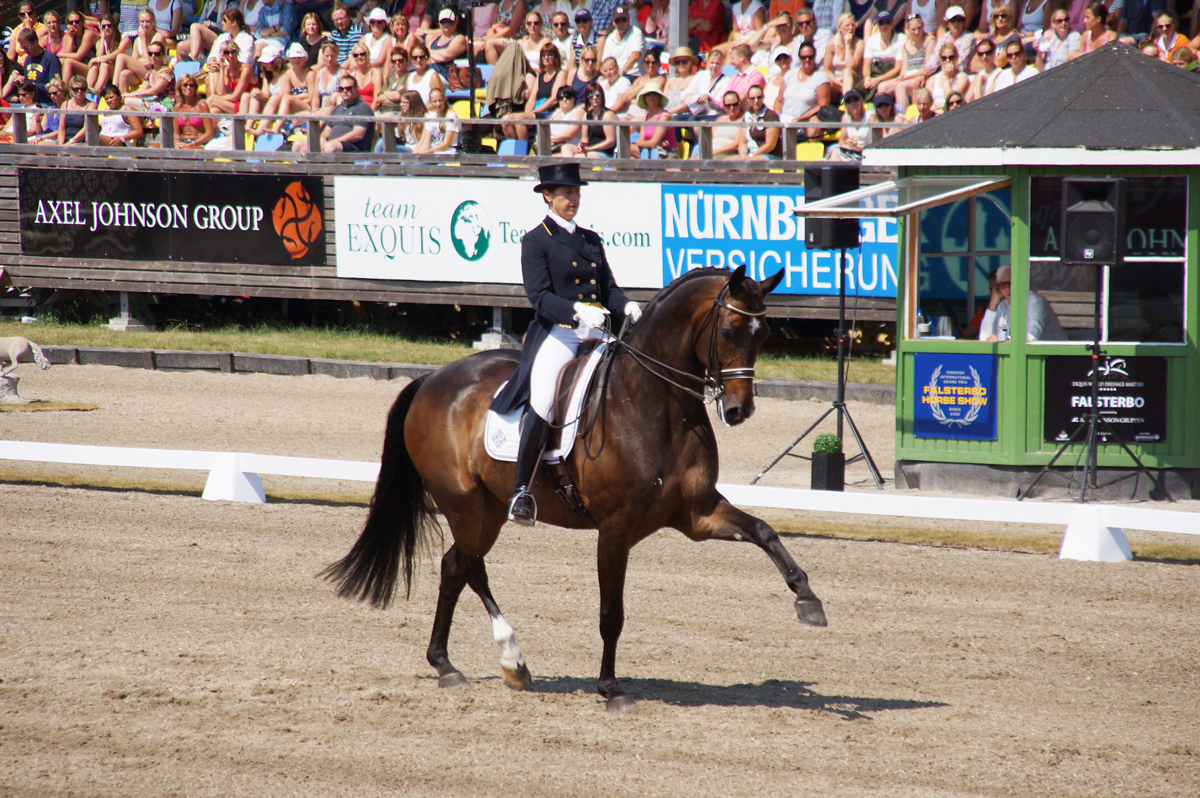
Tinne Vilhelmson and Don Auriello at the 2013 Falsterbo Horse Show

The Falsterbo Horse Show is an annual equestrian event in Falsterbo, Skåne County, Sweden, held in July. It is held as CSIO 5* and CDI 5*.

It is one of the bigger recurring events in Skåne County. The 2014 event attracted over 60,000 visitors. The 2017 event saw over 500 horse riders from 17 countries.

== History ==
Equestrian events in Falsterbo started in the 1920s. In 1969, the first Swedish derby in show jumping, which later became the Falsterbo Horse Show, was organised in Falsterbo by the equestrian club Malmö Civila Ryttarförening. In 1986, an aktiebolag took over the organisation of the event.

In 2010, the Falsterbo Horse Show became an event of the World Dressage Masters. Until 2023, the Falsterbo Horse Show was part of the FEI Nations Cup.

In February 2025, the Emirati-owned stable Al Shira'aa, run by Sheikha Fatima bint Hazza bin Zayed Al Nahyan, bought the sponsoring rights for the event for a six-year period. The following month, the agreement was cancelled due to criticism. According to Sveriges Television, the sponsoring was an example of sportwashing.

== Editions ==
- The 2010 Falsterbo Horse Show was held 8–11 July 2010.
- The 2011 Falsterbo Horse Show was held 7–10 July 2011.
- The 2012 Falsterbo Horse Show was held 12–15 July 2012.
