= Silvana*HDC =

Show jumping mare

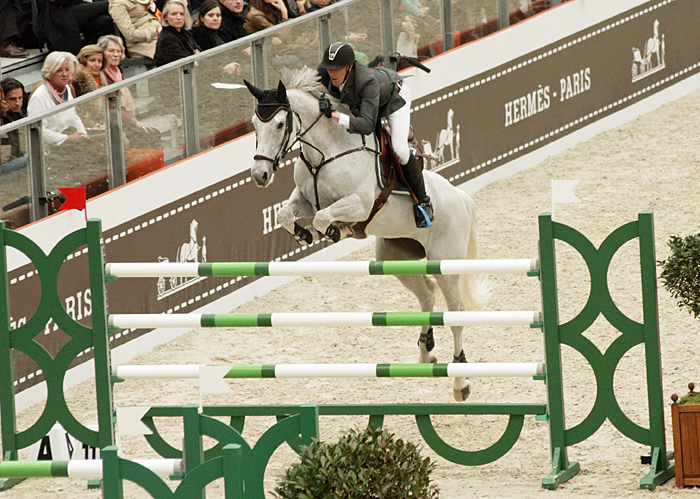
- Breed: Dutch Warmblood
- Sire: Corland
- Grandsire: Cor De La Bryere
- Dam: Donate
- Maternal grandsire: Widor
- Sex: Mare
- Foaled: 1999
- Country: Netherlands
- Colour: Grey
- Breeder: BJ Ter Denge
- Owner: Haras Coudrettes

Silvana*HDC is a Dutch Warmblood show jumping mare. She was foaled in 1999 and was sired by Corland out of Donate. Voted best mare in the world in 2010, she is ridden by the French horse rider Kevin Staut. She was previously ridden by Kristof Cleeren (2007) and Jos Lansink (2008-2009).

== Pedigree ==
Pedigree of Silvana
Sire Corland 1989 Holsteiner	Cor de la Bryère; 1968 Selle Français	Rantzau; 1946 Thoroughbred	Foxlight; 1935
Sire Corland 1989 Holsteiner	Cor de la Bryère; 1968 Selle Français	Rantzau; 1946 Thoroughbred	Rancune; 1940
Sire Corland 1989 Holsteiner	Cor de la Bryère; 1968 Selle Français	Quenotte; 1960 Selle Français	Lurioso; 1955
Sire Corland 1989 Holsteiner	Cor de la Bryère; 1968 Selle Français	Quenotte; 1960 Selle Français	Vestale Du Bois Margot; 1942
Sire Corland 1989 Holsteiner	Thyra; 1981 Holsteiner	Landgraf I 1966 Holsteiner	Ladykiller; 1961
Sire Corland 1989 Holsteiner	Thyra; 1981 Holsteiner	Landgraf I 1966 Holsteiner	Warthburg; 1962
Sire Corland 1989 Holsteiner	Thyra; 1981 Holsteiner	Odetta; 1977 Holsteiner	Ronald; 1970
Sire Corland 1989 Holsteiner	Thyra; 1981 Holsteiner	Odetta; 1977 Holsteiner	Ibylle; 1972
Dam Donate 1985 KWPN	Widor; 1980 KWPN	Marinier; 1971 Selle Français	Juriste; 1953
Dam Donate 1985 KWPN	Widor; 1980 KWPN	Marinier; 1971 Selle Français	Bienvenue; 1967
Dam Donate 1985 KWPN	Widor; 1980 KWPN	Rilonka; 1975 KWPN	Leonidas; 1970
Dam Donate 1985 KWPN	Widor; 1980 KWPN	Rilonka; 1975 KWPN	Ilonka; 1967
Dam Donate 1985 KWPN	Walaika; 1980 KWPN	Pilatus; 1965 Westphalien	Persus; 1959
Dam Donate 1985 KWPN	Walaika; 1980 KWPN	Pilatus; 1965 Westphalien	Duela; 1961
Dam Donate 1985 KWPN	Walaika; 1980 KWPN	Marion; 1971 KWPN	Heros (Amor); 1959
Dam Donate 1985 KWPN	Walaika; 1980 KWPN	Marion; 1971 KWPN	Hetty; 1966
