= International Jumping Riders Club =

- Company type: Non-profit
- Founded: 1977
- Website: www.ijrc.org

International Jumping Riders Club (commonly abbreviated as IJRC, stylized as ijrc) is a non-profit organization that represent equestrian athletes.

== Organization ==
International Jumping Riders Club (IJRC) was created in order to advocate on behalf of equestrian athletes in 1977. Based in Lugano, Switzerland, the IJRC represents the interests of jumping riders, with voting rights to riders in the top 300 of the world rankings in addition to all former Olympic Games competitors, World or Continental Championships competitors, or whom have competed in at least five Nation Cups events. Part of the organization's support includes research into potential horse doping charges, in addition to leading co-operations with the governing body of Equestrian Sports, the International Equestrian Federation (FEI), and other sports institutions. Currently the director of the IJRC is Eleonora Ottaviani and the President is Kevin Staut.

The IJRC organizes the Rolex International Jumping Riders Club Top 10 Final competition, which is known as one of the “major” competitions in show jumping. The IJRC is also a patron of the Young Riders’ Academy. The organization also is the owner of the world rankings list of the show jumping riders, which is published monthly by the FEI in international jumping competitions. In 2016, the IJRC lobbied for changes in the format of the Olympic competition starting in 2020.
