= Discover Ireland =

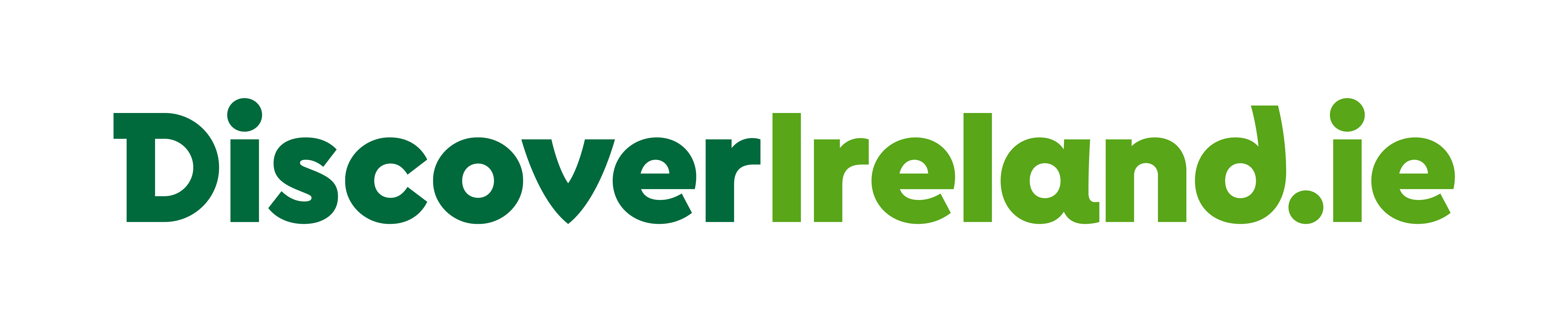
- Website type: Tourism
- Owner: Fáilte Ireland
- Website: www.discoverireland.ie

Discover Ireland is a consumer website operated by Fáilte Ireland, the tourism board of the Republic of Ireland and features information and listings for Irish accommodation, activities, events, tourist attractions and Irish holiday special offers. The Discover Ireland website is supported by a "home holidays" media campaign throughout the year.
