= World Dressage Masters =

The World Dressage Masters – shortened WDM – is an international dressage series held since 2009. All events of the series are held as CDI 5*, the highest level of dressage events.

Main sponsors of the WDM are the Axel Johnson Group, Exquis, the Moorland Stables (the former owners of Totilas), Moorland Investments and the Nürnberger Versicherungsgruppe.

== History and stations of the series ==
In the mid of June 2008, at Jumping international de Cannes, a new dressage series was advertised. Starting in 2009 the first World Dressage Masters season was organized. Planned stations in 2009 were Wellington, Florida, Salzburg, Munich and Hickstead. The horse show in Salzburg was cancelled because of construction works at the Residenzplatz and financing problems. As alternate station of the series Cannes was chosen.

At the 2009/2010 series final in Munich the Falsterbo Horse Show was announced as new WDM station.

At the beginning of 2011 the US-American WDM station changed from Wellington, Florida to the Jim Brandon Equestrian Center, also in the Palm Beach County. In 2011 the French WDM station in Cannes was cancelled.

So the current World Dressage Masters stations are:

- CDI 5* "Falsterbo Horse Show", (Sweden) Skanör med Falsterbo – mid of July
- CDI 5* "Dressage at Hickstead", (United Kingdom) Hickstead – end of July / beginning of August
- CDI 5* "World Dressage Masters Palm Beach", (United Kingdom) Palm Beach County – mid of March
- Final Rider Ranking: CDI 5* "Pferd International", (Germany) Munich – Ascension Day weekend

As concept of the series the focus on top sport, mediability and internationalization of the sport was announced. Each station of the WDM is endowed with €100,000 . These are distributed as follows:

- Grand Prix de Dressage: €10,000, all competitors of the WDM event has to start here
- Grand Prix Spécial (B-Final): €30,000
- Grand Prix Freestyle (A-Final): €60,000

All competitors starts first in the Grand Prix de Dressage. The eight best-placed competitors of the Grand Prix de Dressage are allowed to start in the A-Final (the Grand Prix Freestyle). It some of best-placed competitors want to start in the B-Final, the same number of competitors, who are placed after the best-placed competitors, move up in the A-Final.

== Rider ranking ==
One year after the advertising of the series a new partnership was announced. The Nürnberger Versicherungsgruppe, a German insurance group, become a new main sponsors of the World Dressage Masters. At the same time the Nürnberger WDM rider ranking was started at 2010 Jumping International de Cannes. The final of the rider ranking is always the Munich WDM event.

The WDM rider ranking is endowed with €25,000 . The ranking based on the FEI-dressage world ranking system. The world ranking points of the Grand Prix, Grand Prix Spécial and of the Grand Prix Freestyle multiplied by a factor, gives the rider ranking points.

=== Final rankings of the former years ===
season	winner	second placed	third placed
2009/2010	(Netherlands) Edward Gal; 2910 points	(Netherlands) Adelinde Cornelissen; 2550 points	(Germany) Isabell Werth; 2190 points
2010/2011	(Germany) Anja Plönzke; 2965,5 points	(Sweden) Tinne Vilhelmson-Silfven; 2565 points	(Poland) Michal Rapcewicz; 2160 points
2011/2012	(Sweden) Tinne Vilhelmson-Silfven; 2670 points	(Germany) Anja Plönzke; 2610 points	(Sweden) Patrik Kittel; 2025 points
2012/2013	(Sweden) Tinne Vilhelmson-Silfven; 2133 points	(Sweden) Patrik Kittel; 2078 points	(Germany) Isabell Werth; 1574 points
2013/2014	(Germany) Ulla Salzgeber; 2079 points	(Sweden) Patrik Kittel; 2043 points	(Sweden) Tinne Vilhelmson-Silfven; 1803 points

== Media ==
From the 2009/2010 rider ranking final in Munich up to end of 2010 the German television channel Sport1 broadcast each Grand Prix Freestyle of the series. The broadcast take place at one of the next Saturdays after the events. The German IPTV-channel ClipMyHorse had broadcast in this time most of the WDM events live and had archived them.

Since beginning of 2011 Eurosport is the Global Media Partner of the World Dressage Masters. Eurosport broadcast the Grand Prix Freestyle of the WDM events delayed as part of the Wednesday selection at Wednesday evenings.
