= Jeroen Dubbeldam =

Dutch show jumping champion

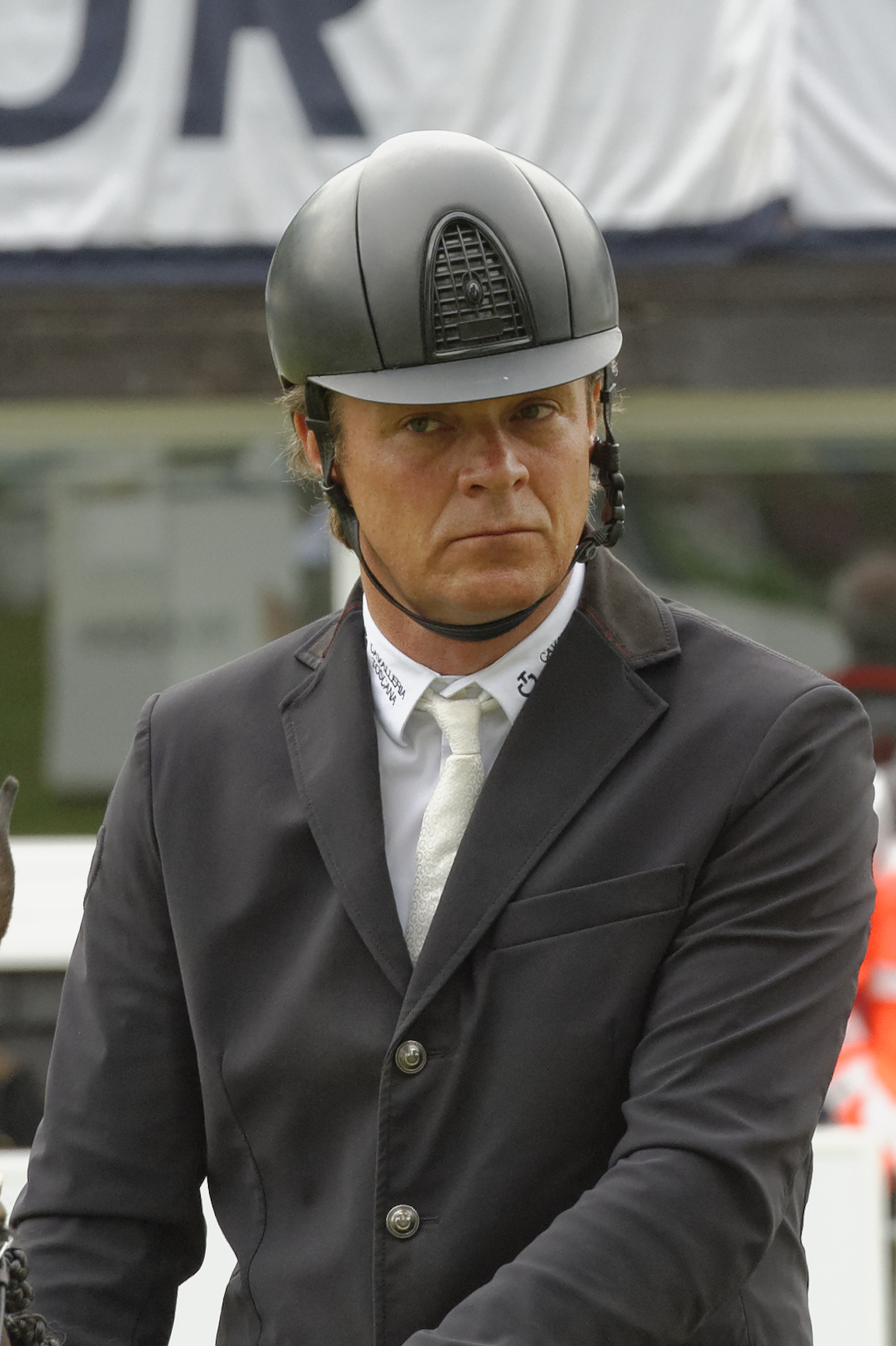

Personal information
- Full name: Jeroen Dubbeldam
- Nationality: Netherlands
- Discipline: Show jumping
- Born: 15 April 1973 (age 52); Zwolle, Netherlands
- Height: 6 ft 1 in (185 cm)
- Weight: 187 lb (85 kg)
Medal record
Representing the Netherlands
Olympic Games
Gold medal – first place	2000 Sydney	Individual jumping
World Championships
Gold medal – first place	2006 Aachen	Team jumping
Gold medal – first place	2014 Normandy	Team jumping
Gold medal – first place	2014 Normandy	Individual jumping
European Championships
Gold medal – first place	2007 Mannheim	Team jumping
Gold medal – first place	2015 Aachen	Individual jumping
Gold medal – first place	2015 Aachen	Team jumping
Bronze medal – third place	1999 Hickstead	Team jumping
Bronze medal – third place	2005 San Patrignano	Individual jumping
Bronze medal – third place	2005 San Patrignano	Team jumping

Jeroen Dubbeldam (born 15 April 1973 in Zwolle) is a Dutch show jumping champion.

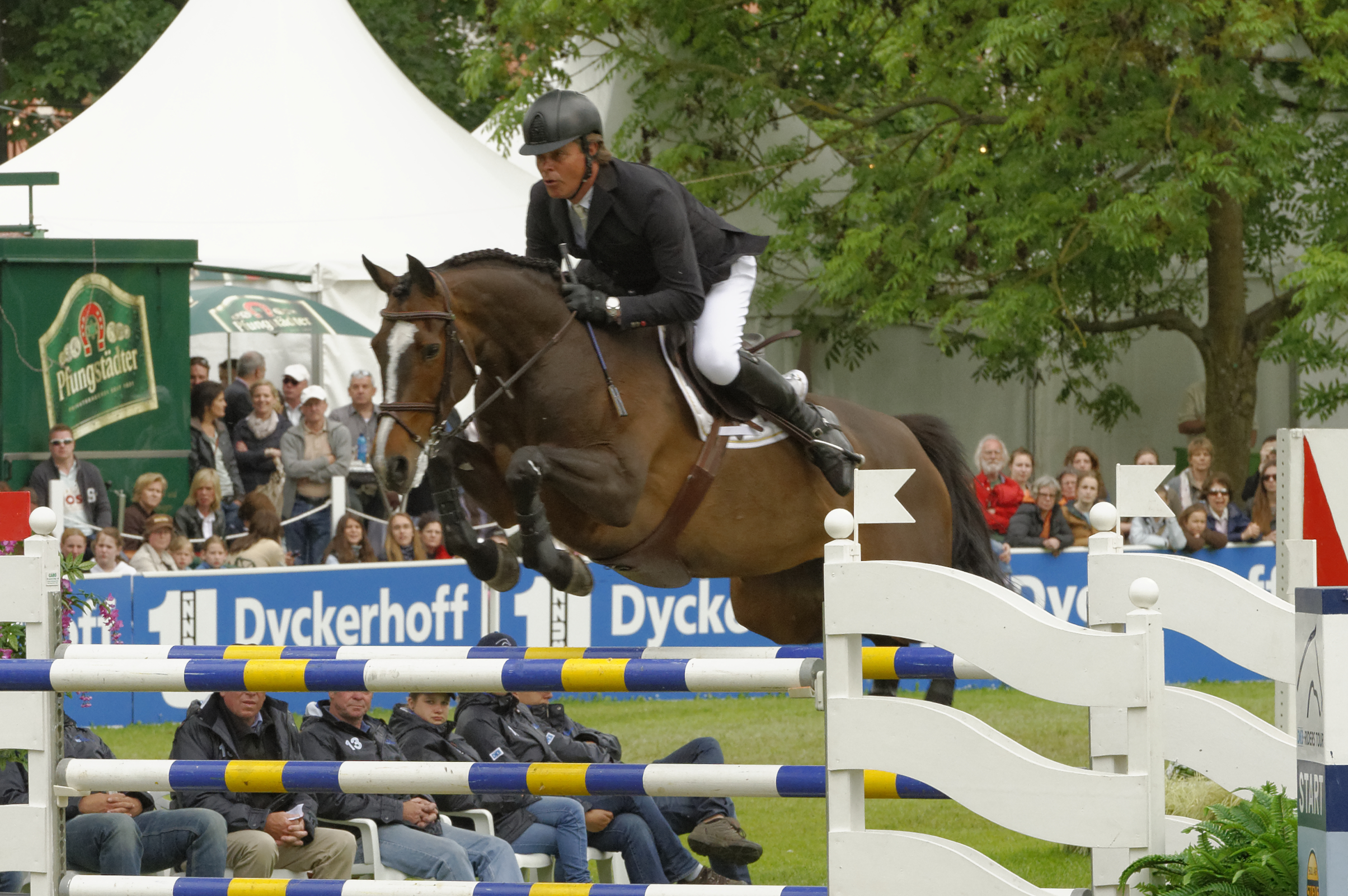
Jeroen Dubbeldam on Utasha, Wiesbaden 2013

Dubbeldam competed at the 2000 Summer Olympics held in Sydney, where he won a gold medal in Individual Jumping on the horse De Sjiem.

He won gold in the individual jumping event at the 2014 World Equestrian Games in Normandy, France as well as being part of the winning Dutch team in the team jumping event on the horse Zenith FN.

Dubbeldam also won Team and Individual gold at the 2015 Aachen European Show Jumping Championships on the horse Zenith FN.

Dubbeldam qualified for the 2016 Summer Olympics and was the Dutch flag bearer for the Parade of Nations. In Individual Jumping, he placed 7th on the horse Zenith. In the Team Jumping competition, the Dutch team finished in 7th place.

== Personal life ==
Jeroen Dubbeldam runs together with his partner Annelies Vorsselmans a barn called ¨De Sjiem¨. Annelies is a show jumper herself and competes alongside Jeroen.

Jeroen has 3 children.

Olympic Games
Preceded by Dorian van Rijsselberghe	Flagbearer for Netherlands; Rio de Janeiro 2016	Succeeded by Keet Oldenbeuving & Churandy Martina
