= Maikel van der Vleuten =

Dutch show jumper (born 1988)

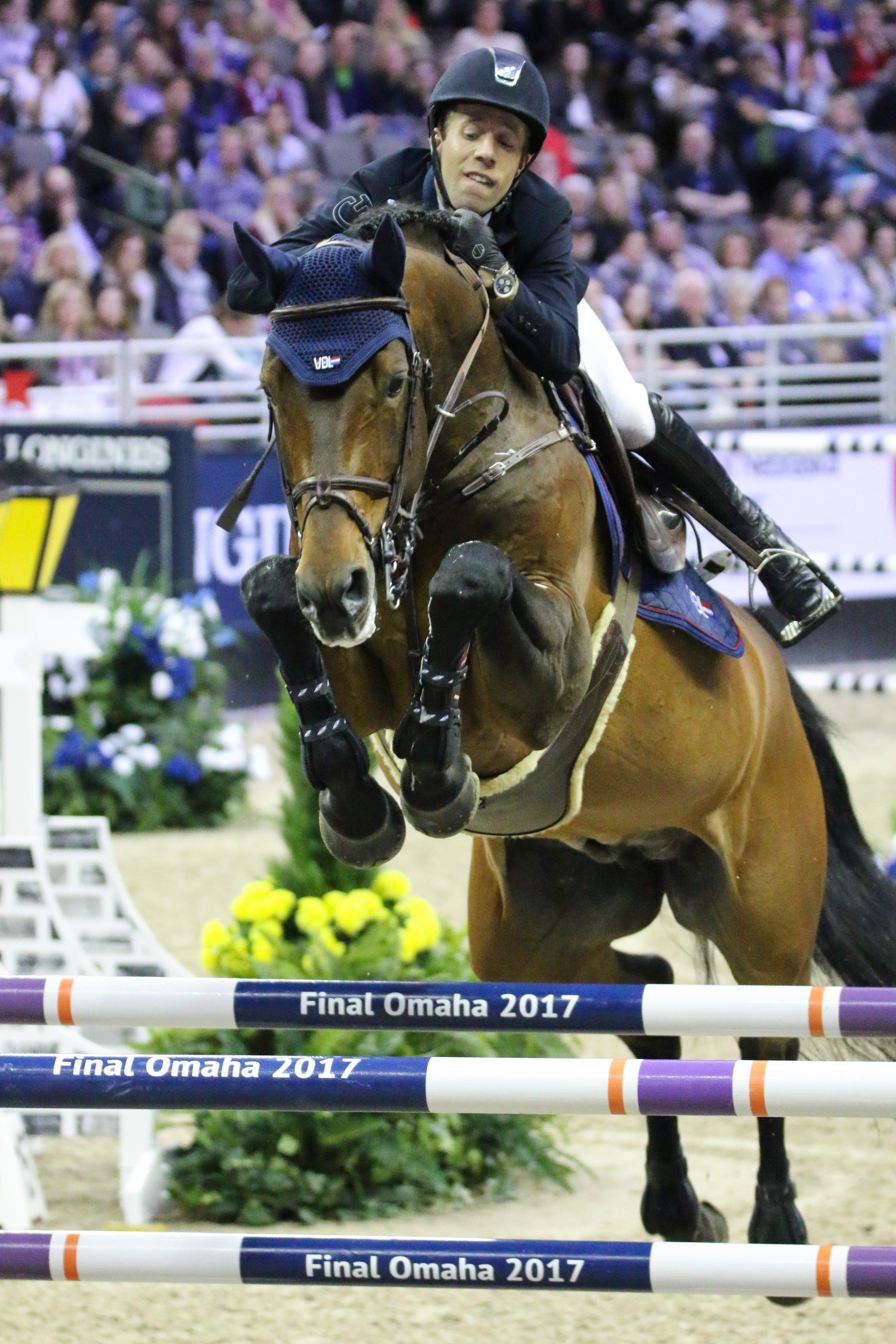
- Van der Vleuten in 2017

Personal information
- Full name: Maikel Leonardus van der Vleuten
- Discipline: Show jumping
- Born: 10 February 1988 (age 38); Geldrop, Netherlands
- Height: 170 cm (5 ft 7 in)
Medal record
Equestrian
Representing the Netherlands
Olympic Games
Silver medal – second place	2012 London	Team jumping
Bronze medal – third place	2020 Tokyo	Individual jumping
Bronze medal – third place	2024 Paris	Individual Jumping
World Championships
Gold medal – first place	2014 Normandy	Team jumping
Silver medal – second place	2022 Herning	Team jumping
Bronze medal – third place	2022 Herning	Individual jumping
European Championships
Gold medal – first place	2015 Aachen	Team jumping

Maikel Leonardus van der Vleuten (born 10 February 1988) is a Dutch show jumping rider. He competed at the 2012 Summer Olympics in London, where he won a silver medal in team jumping and finished 37th in the individual.

As of May 2020, he is ranked as the #15 rider in the world. He has previously been ranked as high as #5 in the world.

== Early life ==
Van der Vleuten was born on 10 February 1988 in Geldrop, the Netherlands. His father, Eric, is a successful show jumper himself, and Maikel and his brother, Eric Jr., grew up with horses. Maikel began riding at the age of 6 and starting competing internationally at the age of 13 in the pony divisions. He competed in his first championship as a junior rider in 2004, and in 2005 he won team gold with Nobel at the FEI European Junior Championship. In the years 2006–2009, van der Vleuten competed in the FEI Young Rider Championships each year, taking home a team silver and a team bronze, and finishing fifth individually three of the four years.

== Professional career ==
Van der Vleuten began competing at the senior level in 2010, jumping his first 5* competition at Rotterdam (NEL). He jumped at his first senior championship the following year, competing for the Netherlands at the 2011 European Championships in Madrid (ESP) where the team finished fourth. In 2012, van der Vleuten was selected for the Dutch team to compete at the London Olympic Games with Verdi TN, where the team won the silver medal. Two years later, Verdi TN and van der Vleuten won the gold medal with the Dutch team at the 2014 World Equestrian Games in Normandy (FRA). They were also 6th at the FEI World Cup Finals in Lyon (FRA) and won the FEI Nations Cup Final in Barcelona (ESP).

Van der Vleuten continued to his international success, winning team gold at the 2015 European Championships, and recording another 6th-place finish at the FEI World Cup Jumping Finals, this time in Las Vegas, NV (USA). Verdi TN and van der Vleuten competed at the 2016 Olympic Games in Rio de Janeiro where they finished 20th individually. Although van der Vleuten had other horses in his string, he used Verdi TN at nearly every championship until Verdi's retirement in March 2020.

Van der Vleuten and his father, Eric, are sponsored by the VDL Groep, an international company that is involved in manufacturing and subcontracting, as well as Massimo Dutti. The duo also is part of the Madrid in Motion Global Champions League team, alongside Eduardo Alvarez Aznar, Mark McAuley, Cindy van der Straten, and Michael G Duffy.

54eme CHI de Genève - 20141212 - Maikel Van der Vleuten et Verdi 11.jpg

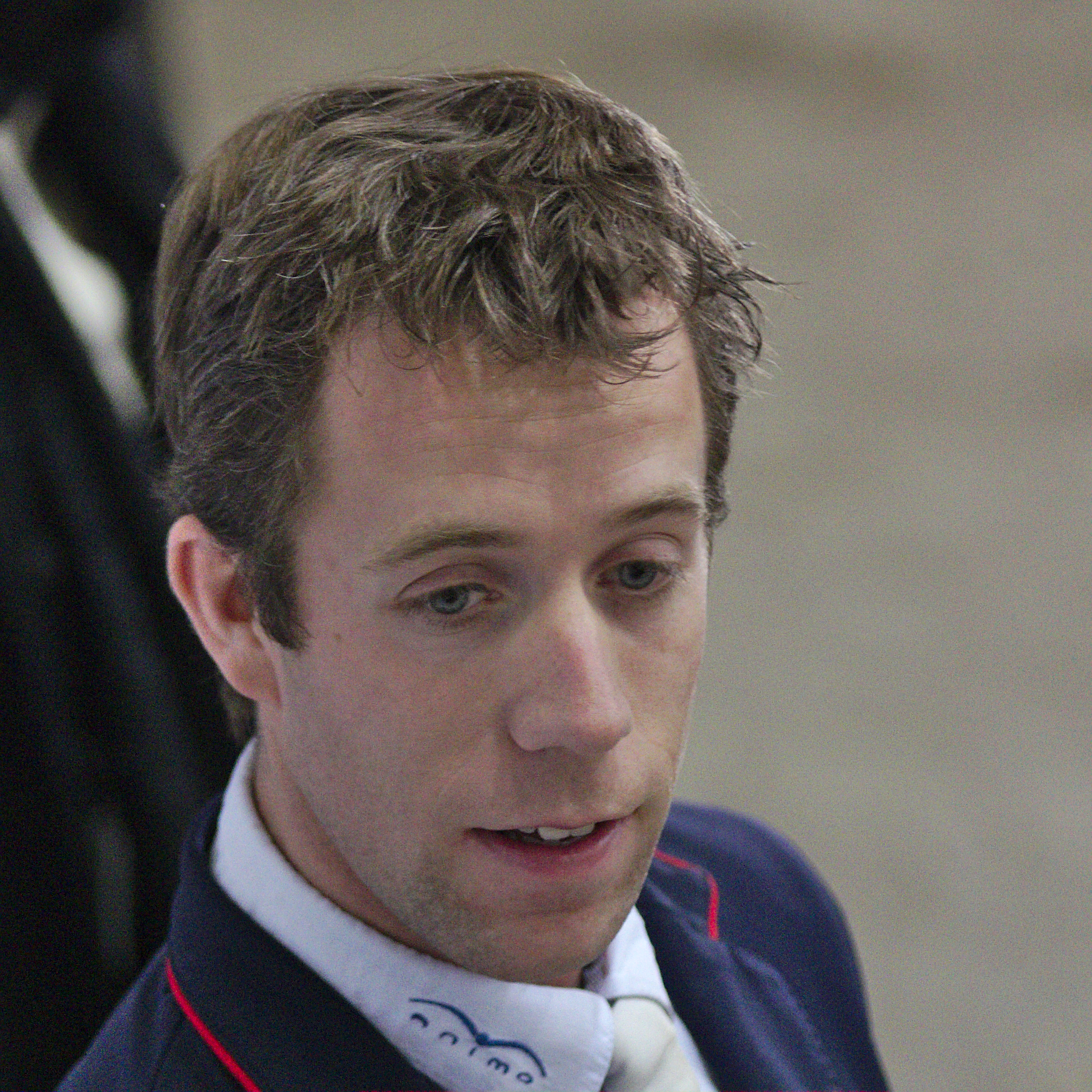
Maikel van der Vleuten

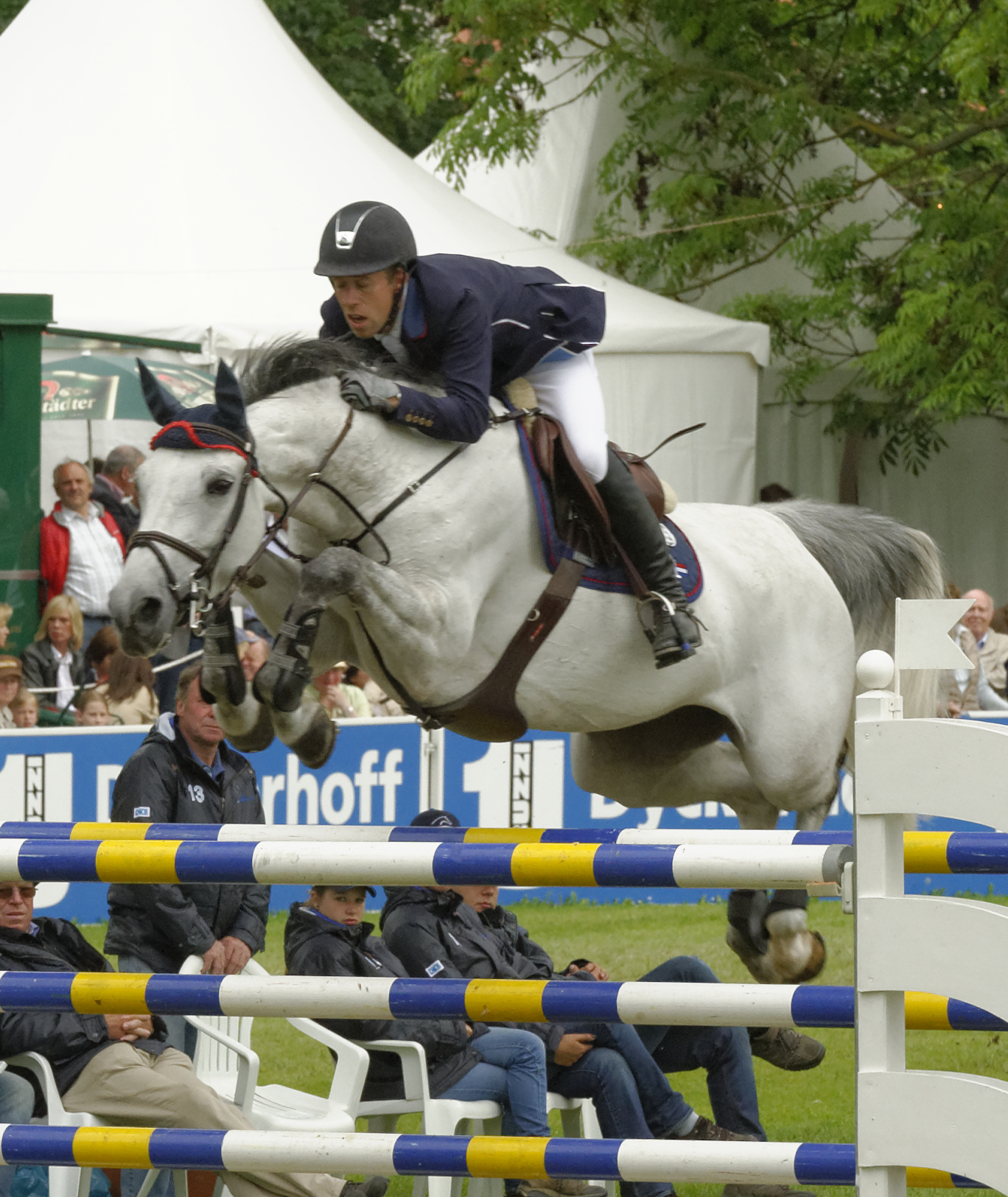
VDL Groep Eureka

== Results ==
Year	Place	Horse	Event	Rating	Show	Location
2019	1	Beauville Z	Longines World Cup Qualifier	CSI5*-W	La Coruña	La Coruña (ESP)
2019	1	Dana Blue	Rikstoto Grand Prix	CSI5*-W	Kingsland Oslo Horse Show	Oslo (SWE)
2019	1	Dana Blue	LGCT Grand Prix of Valkenswaard	CSI5*	LGCT Valkenswaard	Valkenswaard (NEL)
2019	1	Beauville Z	LGCT Grand Prix of Monte Carlo	CSI5*	LGCT Monte Carlo	Monaco (MCO)
2019	1	Dana Blue	Longines Grand Prix	CSI5*	CHIO Twente	Geesteren (NEL)
2018	1	Arera C	Audi Prize 1.55m	CSI5*	Dutch Masters	s-Hertogenbosch (NEL)
2017	1	Arera C	Christmas Cracker 1.55m	CSI5*-W	London Olympia	London (GBR)
2017	1	Verdi TN	Verona World Cup Qualifier	CSI5*-W	Fieracavalli	Verona (ITA)
2016	1	VDL Groep Quatro	Winning Round 1.50m	CSI5*-W	IFEMA Madrid	Madrid (ESP)
2016	20	Verdi TN	Rio de Janeiro Olympics - Individual	OLY	Olympic Games	Rio de Janeiro (BRA)
2016	1	Arera C	Anemone Horse Trucks Grand Prix	CSI4*	Jumping Amsterdam	Amsterdam (NEL)
2015	Gold	Verdi TN	European Championships	CH-EU	European Championships	Aachen (GER)
2015	6	Verdi TN	FEI World Cup Jumping Finals	WC	World Cup Finals	Las Vegas, NV (USA)
2014	1	Verdi TN	FEI Nations Cup Final	CSIO5*	Nations Cup Final	Barcelona (ESP)
2014	1	Ziemar	Beijing World Cup Qualifier	CSI2*-W	Beijing	Beijing (CHN)
2014	Gold	Verdi TN	World Equestrian Games - Team	WEG	World Equestrian Games	Normandy (FRA)
2014	1	Verdi TN	LGCT Grand Prix of Madrid	CSI5*	LGCT Madrid	Madrid (ESP)
2013	1	VDL Groep Sapphire B	London World Cup Qualifier	CSI5*-W	London Olympia	London (GBR)
2013	1	Verdi TN	Longines Grand Prix of Lyon	CSI5*	Equita' Lyon	Lyon (FRA)
2013	1	Verdi TN	Al Ain Longines Grand Prix	CSIO5*	Al Ain Horse Show	Al Ain (AUH)
2012	Silver	Verdi TN	London Olympic Games - Team	OLY	Olympic Games	London (GBR)
