= Andreas Schou =

Danish equestrian

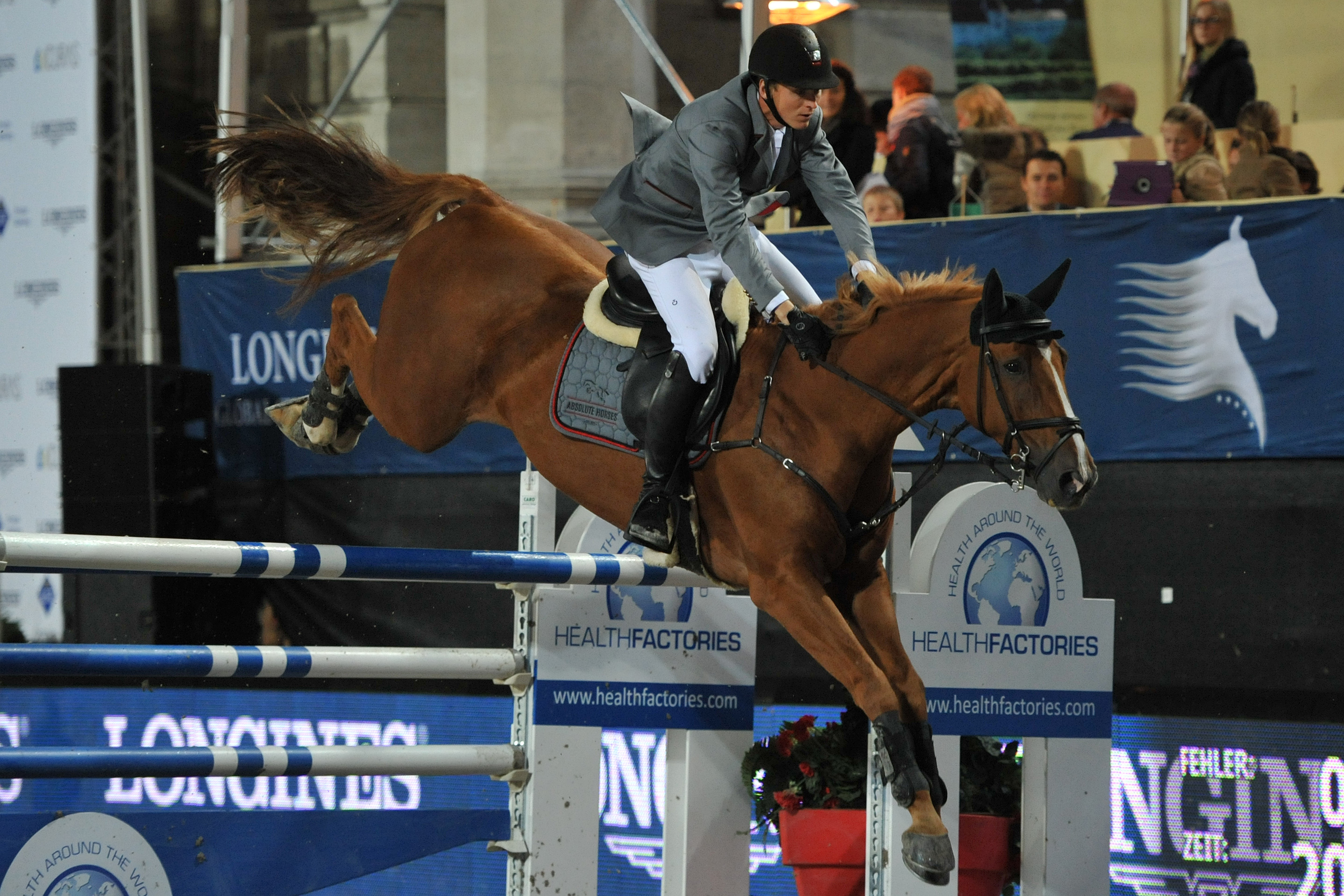
- Schou in 2013

Personal information
- Born: 2 September 1986 (age 39); Kolding, Denmark

Andreas Schou (born 2 September 1986) is a Danish equestrian. He competed in the individual jumping event at the 2020 Summer Olympics.
