= Shane Sweetnam =

Irish equestrian

Personal information
- Born: 19 January 1981 (age 45) Cork, Ireland
- Height: 6 ft 1 in (185 cm)

Sport
- Country: Ireland
- Sport: Equestrian
- Event: Show jumping
Medal record
European Championships
Gold medal – first place	2017 Gothenburg	Team jumping
Silver medal – second place	2023 Milano	Team jumping

Shane Sweetnam (born 19 January 1981) is an Irish equestrian. He competed in the 2020 Summer Olympics.

Sweetnam also competed in 2024 Summer Olympics in France.
