= Billy Twomey =

Irish equestrian

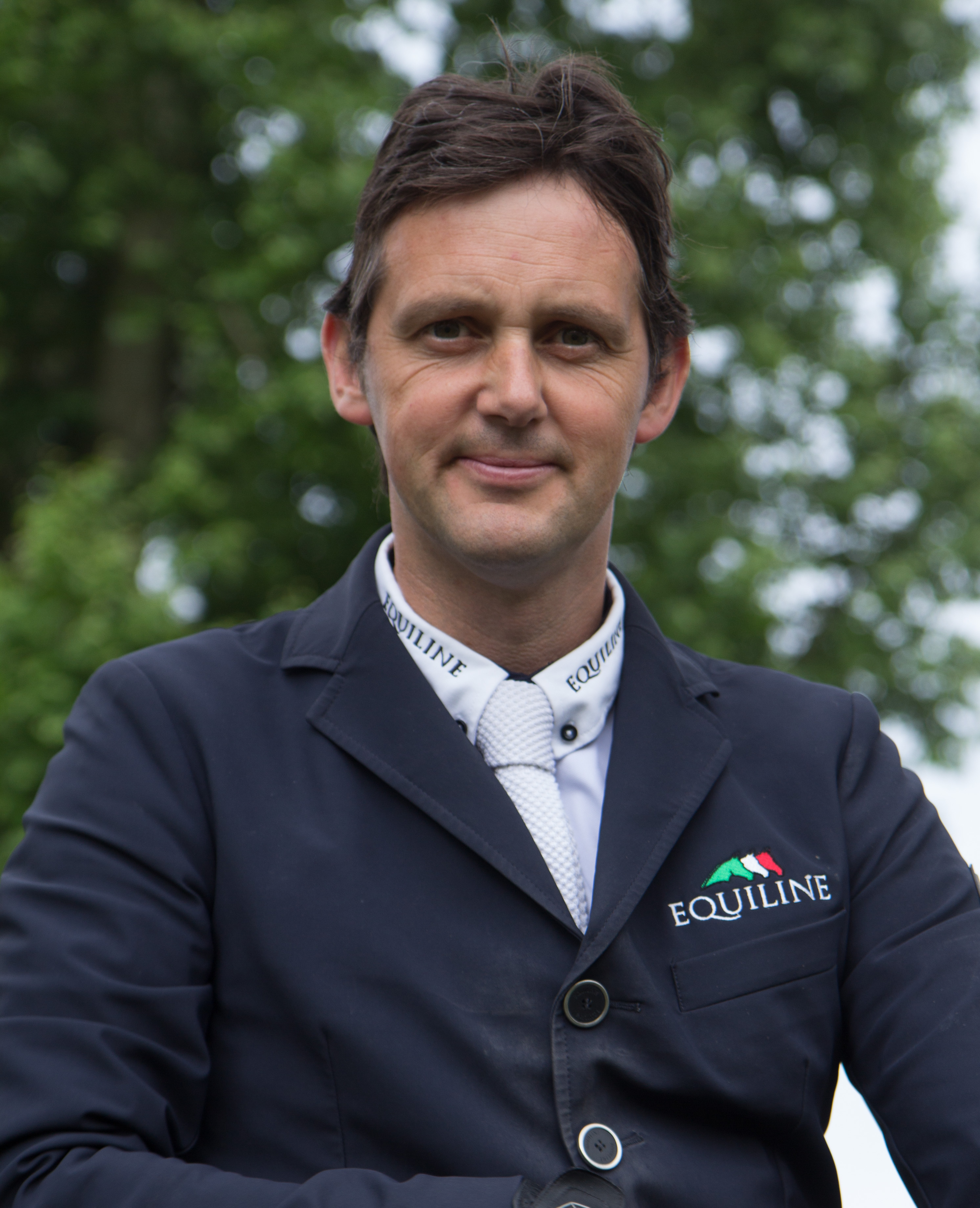
Billy Twomey in 2018

William Twomey (born April 14, 1977) is an Irish equestrian and show jumping rider. He was named Irish International Rider of the Year in 2011 and 2012.

== Major results ==
- 2014
  - 30th, FEI World Cup™ Final, France (Tinka's Serenade)
- 2013
  - 3rd, FEI Nations Cup Final, Spain (Tinka's Serenade)
- 2012
  - 4th, Grand Prix – CSI5* GCT Doha, Qatar (Tinka's Serenade)
  - 3rd, Grand Prix – CSI5* Paris, France (Tinka's Serenade)
  - 4th, Rolex FEI World Cup – CSI5*-W Leipzig, Germany (Tinka's Serenade)
  - 2nd, 'Citroen' Prize – CSI5*-W Leipzig, Germany (Tinka's Serenade)
  - 4th, Grand Prix – CSI5* Basel, Switzerland (Tinka's Serenade)
- 2011
  - 1st, Rolex IJRC Top Ten Final, Gucci Masters Paris, France (Tinka's Serenade)
  - 2nd, 'Mercedes' Masters – CSI5*-W Stuttgart, Germany (Tinka's Serenade)
  - 3rd, Masters – CSI5* Lyon, France (Tinka's Serenade)
  - 1st, FEI Nations Cup – CSIO5* La Baule, France (Romanov)
  - 1st, Grand Prix – CSI5*-GCT Valencia, Spain, (Je t'Aime Flamenco)
  - 2nd, Grand Prix – CSI3* Leipzig, Germany, (Romanov)
  - Rolex Grand Prix – CSI5*-W Zurich, Switzerland, (Tinka's Serenade)
  - Grand Prix – CSI5* Basel, Switzerland, (Tinka's Serenade)
- 2010
  - 2nd, Rolex FEI World Cup qualifier – CSI5*-W London Olympia, England, (Tinka's Serenade)
  - 3rd, Rolex FEI World Cup Qualifier – CSI5*-W Stuttgart German Masters, (Tinka's Serenade)
  - Grand Prix – Barcelona CSI5*, Barcelona, Spain, (Je t'Aime Flamenco)
  - 3rd, Longines Grand Prix, Dublin, Ireland, (Je t'Aime Flamenco)
  - Meydan FEI Nations Cup of Aachen, Germany, (Tinka's Serenade)
  - FEI Nations Cup of Belgium – CSIO4* Lummen, Belgium, (Tinka's Serenade)
  - Grand Prix – Amsterdam CSI4*, Amsterdam, Holland, (Je T'aime Flamenco)
- 2009
  - 2nd, Grand Prix – CSIO4* Barcelona, Spain, (Tinka's Serenade)
  - Grand Prix – St. Gallen CSIO5*, St. Gallen, Switzerland, (Je T'aime Flamenco)
  - Grand Prix – Amsterdam CSI4*, Amsterdam, Holland, (Je T'aime Flamenco)
- 2008
  - 2nd, Grand Prix – CSI3* Oldenburg, Germany, (Je T'aime Flamenco)
  - Grand Prix – Belfast CSI3*, Belfast, Northern Ireland, (Je T'aime Flamenco)
  - Grand Prix – Horse of the Year Show CSI3*, Birmingham, United Kingdom, (Je T'aime Flamenco)
  - 3rd, Grand Prix – CSI4* Sunshine Tour, Vejer de la Frontera, Spain, (Tinka's Serenade)
- 2007
  - 3rd, Grand Prix – Horse of the Year Show CSI3*, Birmingham, United Kingdom, (Tinka's Serenade)
  - Grand Prix – St. Tropez CSI3*, St. Tropez, France, (Anastasia)
  - 2nd, Grand Prix – CSI4* British Open, Birmingham, United Kingdom, (Anastasia)
- 2006
  - 2nd, Grand Prix – CSI3* Belfast, Northern Ireland, (Anastasia)
  - 2nd, Grand Prix – Horse of the Year Show CSI3*, Birmingham, United Kingdom, (Anastasia)
  - Grand Prix – CSI3* Sunshine Tour, Vejer de la Frontera, Spain, (Anastasia)
  - 2nd, Grand Prix – CSI3* Sunshine Tour, Vejer de la Frontera, Spain, (Whinny Jackson)
- 2005
  - Grand Prix – CSI2* Lier, Belgium, (Whinny Jackson)

== Horses ==
Of the 70 horses Twomey has competed with in FEI competitions as of 2024, some of his more memorable mounts include:

- Luidam, a 1993 chestnut KWPN stallion by Guidam.
- Je t'Aime Flamenco, a 2000 bay Belgian Warmblood stallion by Flamenco de Semilly: Winner of seven International Grands Prix, including five-star events at GCT-Valencia (2011), Barcelona (2010), and St. Gallen (2009).
- Tinka's Serenade, a 1997 chestnut AES mare by Tinka's Boy: Winner of the Rolex IJRC Top Ten Final at the Gucci Masters in Paris (2011); member of the winning Irish team in Aachen and Lummen (2010); 11th place in the 2010 World Championships; double-clear rounds in several major Grands Prix, including wins at Basel and Zurich (2011).
- Romanov, a 1998 chestnut KWPN stallion by Heartbreaker: Member of the winning Irish Nations Cup team at CSIO5* La Baule (2011); 2nd place in the CSI3* Grand Prix of Leipzig (2011).
