= Robert Smith (equestrian) =

British show jumper

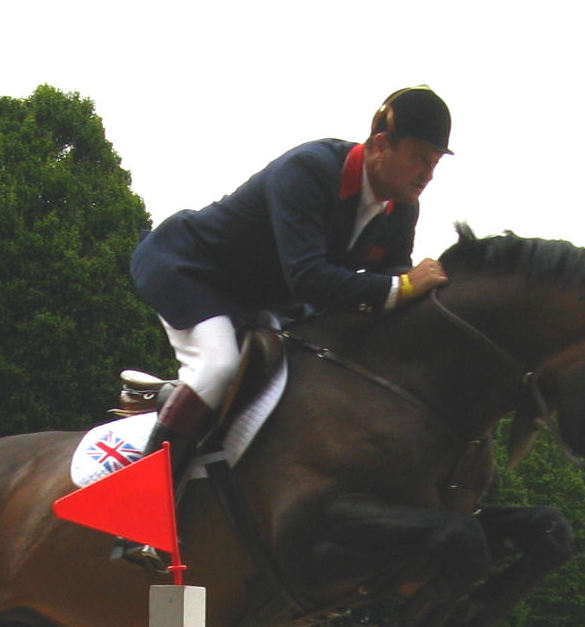
- Robert Smith in 2008

Personal information
- Nationality: British
- Born: 12 June 1961 (age 65)
- Father: Harvey Smith
- Relatives: Steven Smith (brother)

Sport
- Sport: Equestrian

Robert Smith (born 12 June 1961) is a British equestrian. He was born in Yorkshire, a son of Harvey Smith, and brother of Steven Smith, and lives in Shrewley, Warwickshire. He competed in show jumping at the 2004 Summer Olympics in Athens, and placed fourth in the individual contest.
