= Philippe Le Jeune =

Belgian equestrian

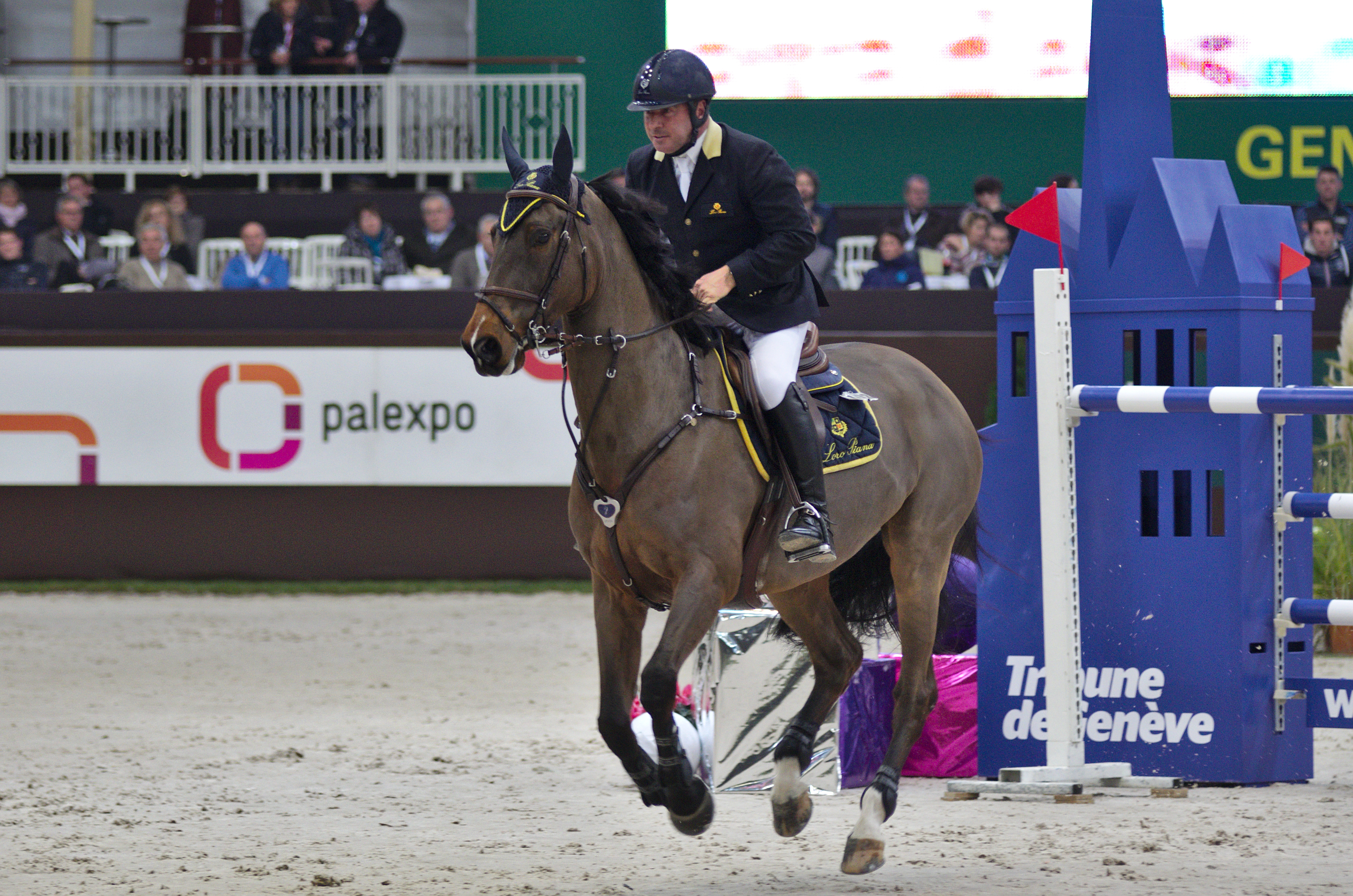
- Philippe Le Jeune in 2013

Personal information
- Nationality: Belgian
- Born: 15 June 1960 (age 65); Uccle, Belgium

Sport
- Sport: Equestrian

Philippe Le Jeune (born 15 June 1960) is a Belgian former equestrian. He competed in two events at the 2012 Summer Olympics.
