= Dirk Demeersman =

Belgian equestrian

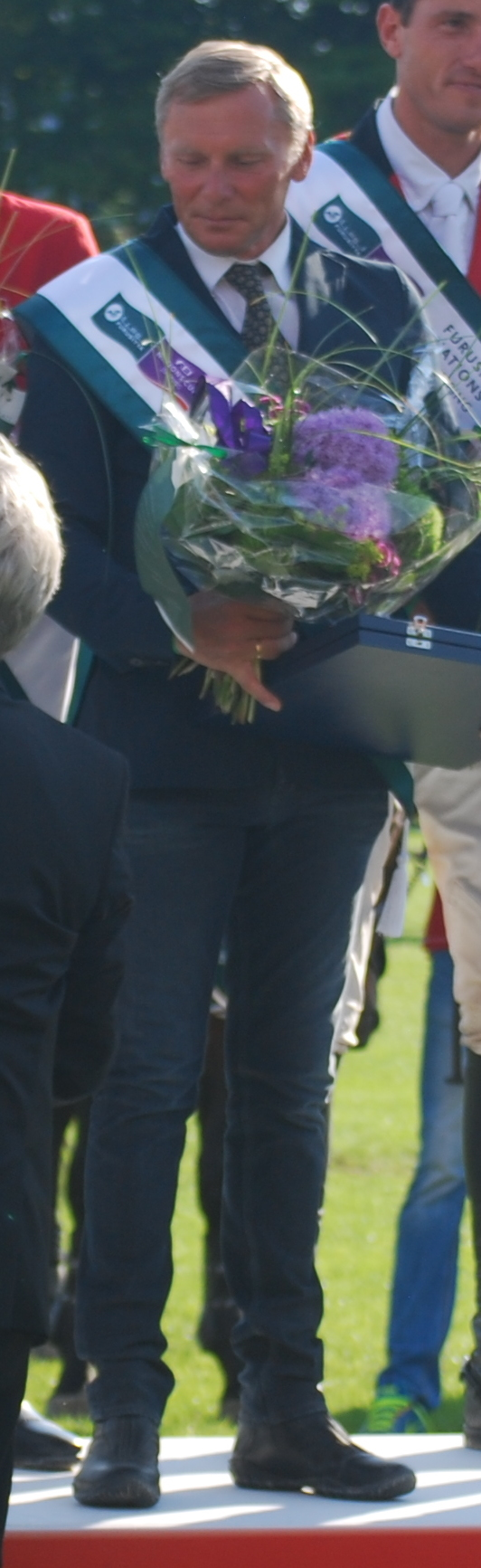
- The Belgian Team winning the CSIO FEI Nations Cup in St. Gallen 2015

Personal information
- Nationality: Belgium
- Discipline: Show jumping
- Born: 15 July 1964 (age 60); Sint-Truiden, Belgium
- Height: 5 ft 7 in (1.70 m)
- Weight: 150 lb (68 kg; 10 st 10 lb)
Medal record
Representing Belgium
World Championships
Bronze medal – third place	2010 Kentucky	Team jumping

Dirk Demeersman (born 15 July 1964) is a Belgian equestrian who competes in the sport of show jumping.

At the 2012 Summer Olympics in London, he was a member of the Belgian team with Bufero VH Panishof, in the team jumping competition which finished in thirteenth place.

== Record ==
=== Olympic Games ===
- 2004 Athens: Equal 4th place with Clinton

=== World Championships ===
- 2010 Kentucky, (USA) with Bufero VH Panishof: Team Bronze
