= Kevin Staut =

French equestrian

Kévin Staut
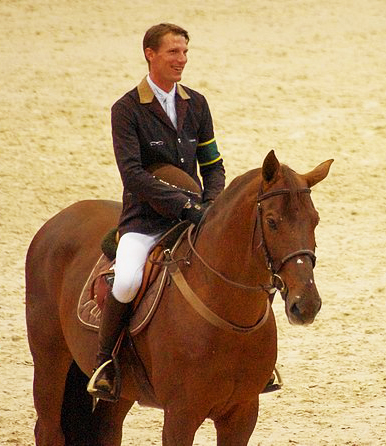
- Staut on Gastronom Z* in October 2010

Personal information
- Full name: Kévin Emmanuel Staut
- Nationality: France
- Discipline: Show jumping
- Born: 15 November 1980 (age 45); Le Chesnay, France
- Height: 6 ft 0 in (1.83 m)
- Weight: 154 lb (70 kg; 11 st 0 lb)
- Horses: Kraque Boom, Silvana*HDC, Rêveur de Hurtebise*HDC, Affair LS La Silla, Cheyenne 111 Z*HDC, Estoy Aqui de Muze*HDC, Uchin Van de Centaur, Zoncordes, Rituel du Sartel, Salomé de Ravel
Medal record
Equestrian
Representing France
Olympic Games
Gold medal – first place	2016 Rio de Janeiro	Team jumping
World Championships
Silver medal – second place	2010 Kentucky	Team jumping
Silver medal – second place	2014 Normandy	Team jumping
European Championships
Gold medal – first place	2009 winsdor	Individual jumping
Silver medal – second place	2011 madrid	Team jumping
European Young Rider Championship
Gold medal – first place	2000 Hartpury	Team jumping
French Junior Championships
Gold medal – first place	1995	Individual jumping

Kévin Emmanuel Staut (born 15 November 1980) is a French equestrian. His specialty is show jumping, either individually or as part of a team. He has received medals at the Show Jumping French Junior Championships, the Show Jumping European Championship for Young Riders, the Show Jumping European Championships, and the Show Jumping World Championships. He placed 34th at the 2012 Summer Olympics and is currently ranked sixth on the FEI Rolex Ranking List.

Staut is recognized as a JustWorld International Rider Ambassador, and frequently donates his time and talent to helping the organization fracture the cycle of poverty for children around the world.

== Life ==
=== Biography ===
Kevin Staut was born 15 November 1980 in Le Chesnay, France. When his mother's horse, Apollon, retired in Normandy, he became immediately fascinated in horseback riding. When Staut was in his fifth year of secondary school, he left the school system to follow correspondence courses. In 1996, he left to stay with Michael Hécart and received an opportunity to ride "some top-quality horses".

In 2000, Staut won the gold medal at the Show Jumping European Championship for Young Riders on the horse Crocodile Man and then went on to work with Hubert Bourdy for a year and a half. In July 2007, Staut, the newest member of the French national equestrian team, went to Aachen, Germany, where his team placed tenth. Soon after, he was selected again for the team to be a part for the European Championships in Mannheim, Germany.

On 30 August 2009, Staut won the gold prize at the Show Jumping European Championships for individual jumping. The next year he was part of the Show Jumping World Championships, where his team ranked second. When he went back to the European Championships, his team ranked second again. At the 2012 Summer Olympics, Staut advanced to Round A of the final round for individual jumping, where he ended in thirty-fourth place on Silvana. Staut was also part of the French team for team jumping, where the team ranked twelfth and Staut personally received four faults. He was later named the President of the International Jumping Riders Club.

=== Personal life ===
Staut enjoys reading Dan Brown and Guillaume Musso. He also watches DVDs, as he has little time for going to a cinema, and particularly enjoys horror films and Clint Eastwood movies.

== Team ==
Kevin Staut's equestrian team includes Laurence Gazel, Frédéric Bouvard, Clémence Jourlin (Riders International Management Company), Vincent Goudin (veterinarian), Dimitri Vandormael (smith), Pierre-Henri Renault (smith), and Kevin Blanco (cavalier).

== Horses ==
Name	Born	Gender	Color	Sire/dam	Breeder	Owner
Silvana*HDC	1999	Mare	Gray	Corland and Donate (Wisdor)	BJ Ter Denge	Haras des Coudrettes
Rêveur de Hurtebise*HDC	2001	Gelding	Chestnut	Kashmir van Schuttershof * Capricieux des Six Sense SBS	Severine Siraux	Haras des Coudrettes
Kraque Boom	1998	Stallion	Bay	Olisco and Baby Boom IV (Joyau d'Or A)	Henriette Evain	Elevage des Nations
Cheyenne 111 Z*HDC	2003	Mare	Bay	Chatman and Ivera M (Calimero)	Harries Theeuwes	Haras des Coudrettes
Estoy Aqui de Muze*HDC	2004	Mare	Chestnut	Malito de Reves and Boyante de Muze (Kashmir van Schuttershof)	Van Mele de Brabander	Haras des Coudrettes
Ayade de Septon*HDC	2006	Mare	Chestnut	Wandor van de Mispelaere and Naiade de Thieuses, SBS	Val de Somme SPRL	Haras des Coudrettes
