= 2010 FEI Nations Cup Promotional League =

Year of show jumping

The 2010 FEI Nations Cup Promotional League was the 2010 edition of the secondary international team Grand Prix show jumping competition run by the FEI. Italy and Belgium having been relegated from the 2009 Meydan FEI Nations Cup.

After the 2009 FEI Nations Cup Promotional League season Spain have been promoted to the 2010 Meydan FEI Nations Cup. Canada waived its right to participate in the 2010 Meydan FEI Nations Cup, so also Poland have been promoted to the 2010 Meydan FEI Nations Cup.

The final of the 2010 FEI Nations Cup Promotional League was held at the CSIO Barcelona, in Barcelona, Spain.

At the end of the 2010 FEI Nations Cup Promotional League season Belgium and Denmark move into the 2011 Meydan FEI Nations Cup.

== Promotional League Europe ==
=== Standings ===
A team of a country that belongs to one of the 2010 Meydan FEI Nations Cup teams can not earn points in this league.

The best-placed team of the 2010 Promotional League Europe, Belgium, move into the 2011 Meydan FEI Nations Cup. The second-placed to seventh-placed teams of the 2010 Promotional League Europe have the permission to start in the 2010 Promotional League Final.

	Team	Points												Total
	Team	GRE (Greece)	BEL (Belgium)	AUT (Austria)	GRE (Greece)	POR (Portugal)	TUR (Turkey)	POL (Poland)	BUL (Bulgaria)	FIN (Finland)	NOR (Norway)	SVK (Slovakia)	ESP (Spain)	Total
1	Belgium	(7)	(6)	12	—	8	(7)	(7)	—	8	12	16	12	68
2	Italy	(3)	(4.5)	9.5	7	10	(6)	10	(3)	—	13	11.5	(1)	61
3	Norway	—	11	5	—	—	—	4	—	4	15	—	2	41
4	Denmark	—	—	2	—	—	—	6	—	7	10.5	—	—	25.5
5	Australia	—	12	13	—	—	—	—	—	—	—	—	—	25
6	Greece	2	—	—	5	—	—	—	8	—	—	9	—	24
7	Hungary	—	—	9.5	—	—	—	9	5	—	—	0	—	23.5
8	Austria	—	—	7	—	—	—	—	—	3	3	10	—	23
9	Turkey	6	—	—	3.5	—	2	—	0	6	2	—	—	19.5
10	Finland	—	2	—	—	2	—	3	—	2	9	—	—	18
11	South Africa	—	—	4	—	1	—	—	—	—	7	4	—	16
12	Belarus	—	—	—	2	—	1	—	6	—	—	3	—	12
13	Bulgaria	1	—	—	1	—	4	—	4	—	—	—	—	10
14	Czech Republic	—	—	—	—	—	—	—	—	—	—	8	—	8
15	Portugal	—	—	—	—	6	—	—	—	—	—	—	—	6
15	Slovakia	—	—	—	—	—	—	—	—	—	—	6	—	6
17	Estonia	—	—	—	—	—	—	—	—	1	—	5	—	6
18	Romania	—	—	—	—	—	—	—	2	—	—	—	—	2
18	Hong Kong	—	—	—	—	—	—	—	—	—	—	2	—	2
20	Japan	—	—	—	—	—	—	—	—	—	1	—	—	1
21	Ukraine	—	—	—	—	—	—	0	—	—	—	—	—	0
		GRE (Greece)	BEL (Belgium)	AUT (Austria)	GRE (Greece)	POR (Portugal)	TUR (Turkey)	POL (Poland)	BUL (Bulgaria)	FIN (Finland)	NOR (Norway)	SVK (Slovakia)	ESP (Spain)	

At the end of the season the points of the six best results of each team are added. The leading team of the final ranking of the 2010 Promotional League Europe are directly qualified for the 2011 Meydan FEI Nations Cup. The second, third, fourth, fifth and sixth placed teams in the final ranking have the chance to start in the 2010 Promotional League Final.

=== Results ===
==== FEI Nations Cup of Greece (2009) ====
CSIO 3* – October 1, 2009 to October 4, 2009 – Markopoulo Olympic Equestrian Centre near Athens, Greece
Competition: Friday, October 2, 2009

	Team	Rider	Horse	Round A	Round B	Total penalties	Jump-off		scoring points
	Team	Rider	Horse	Penalties	Penalties	Total penalties	Penalties	Time (s)	scoring points
1	Germany	Armin Himmelreich	Vulcain des Lauriers	0	0				
1	Germany	Luisa Himmelreich	Sportsmann	0	4				
1	Germany	Ansgar Schmidt	Union Jack II	4					
1	Germany	Jürgen Süßmann	Ruby Lee	0	0				
1	Germany			8	0	8			-
2	Belgium	José Thiry	Roxette de L'Obstination	0	4				
2	Belgium	Rudi Helsen	Aconda II	0	8				
2	Belgium	Gaetan Decroix	Belitys de la Demi Lune	4					
2	Belgium	Kim Thiry	Lancaster V	0	0				
2	Belgium			0	12	12			7
3	Turkey	Sencer Can	Cleveland	0	0				
3	Turkey	Filip Amran	Lancelot du Paradis	4					
3	Turkey	Avni Atabek	Walthery du Ri D'Asse	8	10				
3	Turkey	Omer Karaevli	Oruth G	0	0				
3	Turkey			4	10	14			6
4	Poland	Lukasz Jonczyk	Tarron	4	0				
4	Poland	Jacek Bobik	Taunus	4	4				
4	Poland	Dawid Kubiak	Limbo	18					
4	Poland	Grzegorz Kubiak	Sobieski Ambrosio	0	4				
4	Poland			8	8	16			-
5	Ireland	Niall Talbot	Tequi D'I CH	0	0				
5	Ireland	Nicola Fitzgibbon	Puissance	8	4				
5	Ireland	Alex Duffy	Tampa	10	4				
5	Ireland	Shane Breen	Carmena Z	8					
5	Ireland			16	8	24			-

(Top 5 of 8 Teams)
Grey penalties points do not count for the team result, in the second round only three riders per team are allowed to start.

==== FEI Nations Cup of Belgium ====
CSIO 4* – April 28, 2010 to May 2, 2010 – Lummen (Vlaams Feest van de Paardensport), Belgium
Competition: Friday, April 30, 2010 – Start: 3:00 pm, prize money: 40000 €

	Team	Rider	Horse	Round A	Round B	Total penalties	Jump-off		Prize €	scoring points
	Team	Rider	Horse	Penalties	Penalties	Total penalties	Penalties	Time (s)	Prize €	scoring points
1	Ireland	Denis Lynch	Abberuail van het Dingeshof	0	0					
1	Ireland	Alex Duffy	Tampa	22						
1	Ireland	Shane Breen	Carmena Z	0	0					
1	Ireland	Billy Twomey	Tinka's Serenade	0	0		0	36.70		
1	Ireland			0	0	0	0	36.70	10,000 €	-
2	Australia	Chris Chugg	Vivant	0	0		4	32.12		
2	Australia	Paul Athanasoff	Wirragulla Nicklaus	8						
2	Australia	Phillip Lever	Ashleigh Drossel Dan	0	0					
2	Australia	James Paterson-Robinson	Niack de L'Abbaye	0	0					
2	Australia			0	0	0	4	32.12	8,000 €	12
3	Norway	Stein Endresen	Hoyo de Monterey	12						
3	Norway	Geir Gulliksen	L'Espoir	0	0					
3	Norway	Connie Bull	Cézanne	8	0					
3	Norway	Morten Djupvik	Casino	0	0					
3	Norway			8	0	8			6,000 €	11
4	France	Pénélope Leprevost	Topinambour	4	0					
4	France	Simon Delestre	Melodie Ardente	4						
4	France	Olivier Guillon	Lord de Theize	4	0					
4	France	Kevin Staut	Kraque Boom	0	4					
4	France			4	8	12			4,000 €	-
5	Germany	Alois Pollmann-Schweckhorst	Chacco-Blue	8	0					
5	Germany	Mario Stevens	D'Avignon	4	4					
5	Germany	Philipp Weishaupt	Souvenir	4						
5	Germany	Marcus Ehning	Leconte	4	0					
5	Germany			12	4	16			3,000 €	-

(Top 5 of 13 Teams)
Grey penalties points do not count for the team result, in the second round only three riders per team are allowed to start.

==== FEI Nations Cup of Austria ====
CSIO 3* – May 13, 2010 to May 16, 2010 – Linz (Linzer Pferdefestival), Austria
Competition: Friday, May 14, 2010 – Start: 1:45 pm

	Team	Rider	Horse	Round A	Round B	Total penalties	Jump-off		scoring points
	Team	Rider	Horse	Penalties	Penalties	Total penalties	Penalties	Time (s)	scoring points
1	United Kingdom	Gemma Paternoster	Osiris	4					
1	United Kingdom	Philip Spivey	Romanov	0	4				
1	United Kingdom	Anna Edwards	Unique IX	0	4				
1	United Kingdom	Tina Fletcher	Hello Sailor	0	4				
1	United Kingdom			0	12	12			-
2	Australia	Chris Chugg	Vivant	4	0				
2	Australia	Matt Williams	Urleven van de Helle	4					
2	Australia	Paul Athanasov	Wirragulla Nicholas	0	8				
2	Australia	James Paterson-Robinson	Niack de L Abbaye	0	4				
2	Australia			4	12	16			13
3	Belgium	Peter Devos	Utopia van de Donkhoeve	0	4				
3	Belgium	Patrick Spits	Withney van de Dwerse Hagen	0					
3	Belgium	Niels Bruynseels	Carpalo	4	4				
3	Belgium	Dirk Demeersman	Bufero	8	7				
3	Belgium			4	15	19			12
4	France	Clemence Laborde	Ups'n Downs van den Bandam	8	4				
4	France	Franck Schillewaert	Marquis de la Lande	0	0				
4	France	Vincent Blanchard	L Amour du Bois	8					
4	France	Bruno Broucqsault	Nervoso	0	8				
4	France			8	12	20			-
5	Hungary	Sandor Szas	Goldwing	4	16				
5	Hungary	Balázs Horváth	Santiago	4					
5	Hungary	Mariann Hugyecz	Cash	4	8				
5	Hungary	James Wingrave	Crosshill	0	0				
5	Hungary			8	24	32			9.5
5	Italy	Paolo Zuvadelli	Iouri du Moulin	4	12				
5	Italy	Fabio Brotto	Gitana	4					
5	Italy	Luca Moneta	Jesus de la Commune	4	8				
5	Italy	Roberto Christofoletti	Las Vegas	0	4				
5	Italy			8	24	32			9.5

(Top 6 of 14 Teams)
Grey penalties points do not count for the team result, in the second round only three riders per team are allowed to start.

==== FEI Nations Cup of Greece (2010) ====
CSIO 2*-W – May 13, 2010 to May 16, 2010 – Markopoulo Olympic Equestrian Centre near Athens, Greece
Competition: Friday, May 14, 2010 – Start: 4:30 pm

	Team	Rider	Horse	Round A	Round B	Total penalties	Jump-off		scoring points
	Team	Rider	Horse	Penalties	Penalties	Total penalties	Penalties	Time (s)	scoring points
1	Italy	Alberto Cocconi	Magellan d Utah	8	0				
1	Italy	Davide Kainich	JHG Popey	4	0				
1	Italy	Giovanni Oberti	Caribo Z	8	4				
1	Italy	Lucia Vizzini	Quinta Roo	0					
1	Italy			12	4	16			7
2	Greece	Hannah Mytilinaiou	Natacha Delaunay	8	4				
2	Greece	Myrto Illiadi-Koutsikou	Lazzarone	8	12				
2	Greece	Elina Dendrinou	W.K. Liberty	0	4				
2	Greece	Alexandros Fourlis	Riandra	12					
2	Greece			16	20	36			5
3	Turkey	Serra Sengel	Feng Schui	8					
3	Turkey	Sencer Horasan	Lavaro	8	0				
3	Turkey	Ulkan Delikan	Quattros	4	8				
3	Turkey	Sencer Can	Cleveland	8	16				
3	Turkey			20	24	44			3.5
3	Germany	Armin Himmelreich	Vulcain des Lauriers	16	4				
3	Germany	Luisa Himmelreich	Sportsmann	8	4				
3	Germany	Ansgar Schmidt	Union Jack II	17					
3	Germany	Jürgen Süßmann	Ruby Lee	8	4				
3	Germany			32	12	44			-

(Top 4 of 6 Teams)
Grey penalties points do not count for the team result, in the second round only three riders per team are allowed to start.

==== FEI Nations Cup of Portugal ====
CSIO 4* – May 27, 2010 to May 30, 2010 – Lisbon, Portugal
Competition: Sunday, May 30, 2010 – Start: 3:00 pm, prize money: 40000 €

	Team	Rider	Horse	Round A	Round B	Total penalties	Jump-off		Prize €	scoring points
	Team	Rider	Horse	Penalties	Penalties	Total penalties	Penalties	Time (s)	Prize €	scoring points
1	Netherlands	Henk van de Pol	Abeltje Z	0	0					
1	Netherlands	Aniek Poels	Asteria	0	0					
1	Netherlands	Marlies van Soest	Rodos	5						
1	Netherlands	Peter Bulthuis	Cashmir	0	1					
1	Netherlands			0	1	1			12,800 €	-
2	United Kingdom	Charlotte Platt	Ulien	retired						
2	United Kingdom	William Funnell	Billy Congo	4	4					
2	United Kingdom	Robert Bevis	Courtney	0	0					
2	United Kingdom	Tim Stockdale	Kalico Bay	0	0					
2	United Kingdom			4	4	8			8,000 €	-
3	Italy	Andrea Herholdt	Viko	4	0					
3	Italy	Daniele Augusto da Rios	Ultimate	1	4					
3	Italy	Francesca Capponi	Stallone	0	0					
3	Italy	Luca Moneta	Jesus de la Commune	8						
3	Italy			5	4	9			6,000 €	10
4	Belgium	Ludo Philippaerts	Nobel de Virton	0	0					
4	Belgium	Jerome Guery	Waldo	4	8					
4	Belgium	François Mathy	Ivoire du Rouet	8						
4	Belgium	Grégory Wathelet	Wonami van de Aard	0	0					
4	Belgium			4	8	12			3,335 €	8
4	Switzerland	Nadja Steiner	Lucifer Platiere	0	0					
4	Switzerland	Claudia Gisler	Touchable	0	4					
4	Switzerland	Nadine Traber	Part of Me	eliminated						
4	Switzerland	Arthur Gustavo da Silva	La Toya III	4	4					
4	Switzerland			4	8	12			3,335 €	-
4	Ireland	Shane Sweetnam	Zamiro	12						
4	Ireland	David Quigley	Ulot	0	4					
4	Ireland	Trevor Breen	Adventure de Kannan	4	4					
4	Ireland	Shane Breen	Mullaghdrin Gold Rain	0	0					
4	Ireland			4	8	12			3,335 €	-

(Top 6 of 12 Teams)
Grey penalties points do not count for the team result, in the second round only three riders per team are allowed to start.

==== FEI Nations Cup of Turkey ====
CSIO 3* – June 11, 2010 to June 13, 2010 – Istanbul, Turkey
Competition: Friday, June 11, 2010 at 5:00 pm

	Team	Rider	Horse	Round A	Round B	Total penalties	Jump-off		scoring points
	Team	Rider	Horse	Penalties	Penalties	Total penalties	Penalties	Time (s)	scoring points
1	France	Stephan Lafouge	Visage van de Olmenhoeve	8					
1	France	Caroline Nicolas	Nobylis	4	0				
1	France	Yoann Le Vot	Modena	4	1				
1	France	Jean Marc Nicolas	Oxford D'Esquelmes	0	4				
1	France			8	5	13			-
2	Belgium	Nick Motmans	Aladdin St Ghyvan	20					
2	Belgium	Candice Lauwers	Cibolin Prieure Z	4	0				
2	Belgium	Jody Bosteels	Nina Droeshout	4	8				
2	Belgium	Jan Motmans	Vacant ter Linden	0	0				
2	Belgium			8	8	16			7
3	Italy	Luca Marziani	Cascartho -O.H.	4					
3	Italy	Giovanni Oberti	Caribo Z	4	4				
3	Italy	Andrea Messersi	Vacant ter Linden	4	4				
3	Italy	Paolo Zuvadelli	Youri du Moulin	4	0				
3	Italy			12	8	20			6
4	United States	Laura Teodori	Kasoar D'uxelles	4	8				
4	United States	Jessica Siuda	Unbelievable	did not start					
4	United States	Jennifer Jones	Lavande de L'Isle	4	12				
4	United States	Peter Wylde	Sanctos van het Gravenhof	4	4				
4	United States			12	16	28			-
5	Bulgaria	Angel Niagolov	Stritzel	12	8				
5	Bulgaria	Jhristo Naidenov	Valido	eliminated					
5	Bulgaria	Asparuh Atanasov	Jessika de Bois	9	8				
5	Bulgaria	Ivelin Valev	Equita	0	0				
5	Bulgaria			21	16	37			4
6	Germany	Luisa Himmelreich	Sportsmann	eliminated					
6	Germany	Ansgar Schmidt	Union Jack II	12	0				
6	Germany	Matthias Gude	Ruby Lee	8	12				
6	Germany	Armin Himmelreich	Vulcain des Lauriers	8	4				
6	Germany			28	16	44			-

(Top 6 of 8 Teams)
Grey penalties points do not count for the team result, in the second round only three riders per team are allowed to start.

==== FEI Nations Cup of Poland ====
CSIO 3* – June 10, 2010 to June 13, 2010 – Sopot, Poland
Competition: Saturday, June 12, 2010 at 11.30 am

	Team	Rider	Horse	Round A	Round B	Total penalties	Jump-off		Prize CHF	scoring points
	Team	Rider	Horse	Penalties	Penalties	Total penalties	Penalties	Time (s)	Prize CHF	scoring points
1	Germany	Franz-Josef Dahlmann	Lifou	0	4					
1	Germany	Sarah Nagel-Tornau	Udarco	4	1					
1	Germany	Andre Thieme	Aragon Rouet	9	1					
1	Germany	Felix Hassmann	Lianos	4						
1	Germany			8	6	14			10,650 CHF	-
2	Italy	Lucia Vizzini	Quinta Roo	12	0					
2	Italy	Emanuele Gaudiano	Chicago	4	4					
2	Italy	Davide Kainich	Loro Piana JHG	4						
2	Italy	Massimo Grossato	Lady Luna	1	4					
2	Italy			9	8	17			7,050 CHF	10
3	Hungary	Sándor Szász	Moosbachhofs Goldwing	8	0					
3	Hungary	Balázs Horváth	Santiago	1	9					
3	Hungary	Mariann Hugyecz	Cash	8	0					
3	Hungary	James Wingrave	Sissi	8						
3	Hungary			17	9	26			5,250 CHF	9
4	Poland	Andrzej Głoskowski	Imequyl	8	4					
4	Poland	Antoni Tomaszewski	Trojka	0	4					
4	Poland	Dawid Kubiak	Limbo	9						
4	Poland	Jarosław Skrzyczyński	Coriana	0	12					
4	Poland			8	20	28			3,450 CHF	-
5	Belgium	Patrik Spits	Withney van de Dwerse Hagen	11	8					
5	Belgium	Wilm Vermeir	Bernadien van Westuur	8						
5	Belgium	Lieven Devos	Myra	4	8					
5	Belgium	Marc van Dijck	Valencia	4	0					
5	Belgium			16	16	32			2,850 CHF	7
6	Denmark	Andreas Schou	Uno's Safier	0	5					
6	Denmark	Jennifer Fogh Pedersen	Ufo	8	12					
6	Denmark	Christian Schou	Coronada	9						
6	Denmark	Tina Lund	Zamiro	4	8					
6	Denmark			12	25	37			2,550 CHF	6

(Top 6 of 11 Teams)
Grey penalties points do not count for the team result, in the second round only three riders per team are allowed to start.

==== FEI Nations Cup of Bulgaria ====
CSIO 2* – June 17, 2010 to June 20, 2010 – Bozhurishte near Sofia, Bulgaria
Competition: Friday, June 18, 2010 at 3.00 pm

	Team	Rider	Horse	Round A	Round B	Total penalties	Jump-off		Prize money €	scoring points
	Team	Rider	Horse	Penalties	Penalties	Total penalties	Penalties	Time (s)	Prize money €	scoring points
1	Greece	Dimitris Natsis	Nilda Rouge	8	4					
1	Greece	Yuri Koermendi	Siljona B	4	9					
1	Greece	Avgerinos Linardos	Tyson	6	11					
1	Greece	Kriton Zafeiropoulos	Vieanne	8						
1	Greece			18	24	42			6,000 €	8
2	Belarus	Vasil Ivanou	Aleqs	1	8					
2	Belarus	Igor Vasiljev	Casimir	8	8					
2	Belarus	Ibragim Vaskov	Lantol	13	9					
2	Belarus	Yahor Morotski	A Cappella	16						
2	Belarus			22	25	47			5,000 €	6
3	Hungary	Kaarlo Kovacs	Cassius	5	6					
3	Hungary	Anita Szabó	Very N	1	10					
3	Hungary	Szabolcs Krucso	Charisma	13	13					
3	Hungary	Zoltan Czekus	Karina	19						
3	Hungary			19	29	48			3,500 €	5
4	Bulgaria	Ivelin Valev	Equita	8	8					
4	Bulgaria	Asparuh Atanasov	Jessika de Bois	8	8					
4	Bulgaria	Angel Niagolov	Stritzel	5	13					
4	Bulgaria	Rossen Raichev	Cassus van Caycele	12						
4	Bulgaria			21	29	50			2,000 €	4

(Top 4 of 7 Teams)
Grey penalties points do not count for the team result, in the second round only three riders per team are allowed to start.

==== FEI Nations Cup of Finland ====
CSIO 3* – June 18, 2010 to June 20, 2010 – Ypäjä, Finland
Competition: Sunday, June 20, 2010

	Team	Rider	Horse	Round A	Round B	Total penalties	Jump-off		scoring points
	Team	Rider	Horse	Penalties	Penalties	Total penalties	Penalties	Time (s)	scoring points
1	Ireland	Joan Greene	Biscaya Déversem	0	0				
1	Ireland	Edward Little	Kalvinretto	4					
1	Ireland	Alexander Butler	Will Wimble	1	0				
1	Ireland	Tholm Keane	Warrenstown You 2	4	0				
1	Ireland			5	0	5			-
2	Belgium	Philippe Le Jeune	Boyente de Muze	1	0				
2	Belgium	Evelyne Blaton	Haruba	1	0				
2	Belgium	Cindy van der Straten	Luxana-H	2					
2	Belgium	Gudrun Patteet	Carlino G	5	4				
2	Belgium			4	4	8			8
3	Denmark	Karina Skou Truelsen	Lord if de Chalousse	4	0				
3	Denmark	Rikke Haastrup	Luganer	1	0				
3	Denmark	Torben Frandsen	Alcamo Vogt	9					
3	Denmark	Thomas Sandgaard	Rubber Ball	0	4				
3	Denmark			5	4	9			7
4	Turkey	Omer Karaevli	Cando	1	6				
4	Turkey	Cagri Basel	Concept	9	5				
4	Turkey	Sevil Sabancı	Cotarus Z	10					
4	Turkey	Gerry Flynn	Castelo Branco	0	0				
4	Turkey			10	11	21			6
5	Sweden	Lisen Bratt Fredricson	Matrix	4	1				
5	Sweden	Sara Samuelsson	L´Esprit	21					
5	Sweden	Elin Hultberg	Midsummer	9	1				
5	Sweden	Malin Nilsson	Prizilla	9	1				
5	Sweden			22	3	25			-
6	Norway	Anita Sande	Aman	4	16				
6	Norway	Christian Anfinnsen Øien	Unbelievable	6					
6	Norway	Stine Bergersen Løkken	Laroso	1	0				
6	Norway	Nicolai Lindbjerg	Coquette	1	5				
6	Norway			6	21	27			4

(Top 6 of 9 Teams)
Grey penalties points do not count for the team result, in the second round only three riders per team are allowed to start.

==== FEI Nations Cup of Norway ====
CSIO 3* – June 24, 2010 to June 27, 2010 – Drammen, Norway
Competition: Saturday, June 26, 2010 at 2:00 pm

	Team	Rider	Horse	Round A	Round B	Total penalties	Jump-off		Prize money NOK	scoring points
	Team	Rider	Horse	Penalties	Penalties	Total penalties	Penalties	Time (s)	Prize money NOK	scoring points
1	Norway	Stein Endresen	Hoyo de Monterey	8						
1	Norway	Geir Gulliksen	L'Espoir	0	0					
1	Norway	Connie Bull	Cézanne	0	0					
1	Norway	Morten Djupvik	Bessemeind's Casino	0	0					
1	Norway			0	0	0			50,820 NOK	15
2	Italy	Roberto Cristofoletti	Las Vegas	4	4					
2	Italy	Alberto Cocconi	Magellan D`Uthah	0	?					
2	Italy	Gabriele Grassi	American Blu van Eeklelchem	?	?					
2	Italy	Emilio Bicocchi	Kapitol D`Argonne	0	?					
2	Italy			4	4	8			30,800 NOK	13
3	Belgium	Pieter Devos	Utopia van den Donkhoeve	0	0					
3	Belgium	Rik Hemeryck	Quarco de Kerambars	0	13					
3	Belgium	Kevin Gielen	Robbedoes	8						
3	Belgium	Niels Bruynseels	Carpalo	0	0					
3	Belgium			0	13	13			23,100 NOK	12
4	Denmark	Thomas Velin	Godsend du Reverdy	0	0					
4	Denmark	Tina Lund	Zamiro	0	8					
4	Denmark	Charlotte Lund	Cartani	8	8					
4	Denmark	Andreas Schou	Unos Safier	20						
4	Denmark			8	16	24			7,700 NOK	10.5
4	Netherlands	Jur Vrieling	Bubalu	0	0					
4	Netherlands	Piet Raijmakers junior	Lys Platiere	4	4					
4	Netherlands	Peter Geerink	Lonesome Diams Hoqeu	12						
4	Netherlands	Peter Bulthuis	Cashmir	8	8					
4	Netherlands			12	12	24			7,700 NOK	-
6	Finland	Satu Liukkonen	Qui Vivra Verra	0	12					
6	Finland	Anna-Julia Kontio	Eafons Escape	4	16					
6	Finland	Sebastian Numminen	Calandro	4	12					
6	Finland	Thomas Ehrnrooth	Larissa	retired						
6	Finland			8	40	48			-	9

(Top 6 of 14 Teams)
Grey penalties points do not count for the team result, in the second round only three riders per team are allowed to start.

==== FEI Nations Cup of Slovakia ====
CSIO 3*-W – August 5, 2010 to August 8, 2010 – Bratislava, Slovakia
Competition: Friday, August 6, 2010 at 1:00 pm

	Team	Rider	Horse	Round A	Round B	Total penalties	Jump-off		Prize money €	scoring points
	Team	Rider	Horse	Penalties	Penalties	Total penalties	Penalties	Time (s)	Prize money €	scoring points
1	Belgium	Ludo Philippaerts	Nobel de Virton	12						
1	Belgium	Grégory Wathelet	Copin van de Broy	0	0					
1	Belgium	Dirk Demeersman	Bufero van het Panishof	4	4					
1	Belgium	Philippe Le Jeune	Boyante de Muze	0	8					
1	Belgium			4	12	16			6,450 €	16
2	Poland	Piotr Sawicki	Caballus Z	0	8					
2	Poland	Antoni Tomaszewski	Trojka	4	4					
2	Poland	Msciwoj Kiecon	Urbane	4						
2	Poland	Andrzej Gloskowski	Imequyl	0	8					
2	Poland			4	20	24			4,450 €	-
3	France	Alain Bourdon	Nouméa Deux	4	16					
3	France	Caroline Nicolas	Nobylis	0	4					
3	France	Clemence Laborde	Ups'n Downs van den Banda	0	8					
3	France	Clement Boulanger	Winsome van de Plataan	24						
3	France			4	28	32			2,850 €	-
4	Italy	Giovanni Oberti	Caribo Z	12	12					
4	Italy	Emanuele Gaudiano	Chicago	4	8					
4	Italy	Daniele Augusto da Rios	Ultimate	12						
4	Italy	Fabio Brotto	R-Gitana	0	0					
4	Italy			16	20	36			1,850 €	11.5
4	Germany	Toni Hassmann	Baron PKZ	16						
4	Germany	Alexander Hufenstuhl	Lacapo	12	0					
4	Germany	Tim Hoster	Rastellie	4	8					
4	Germany	Felix Hassmann	St. Lucia	4	8					
4	Germany			20	16	36			1,850 €	-
6	Austria	Matthias Raisch	Lionel	0	4					
6	Austria	Matthias Atzmüller	Tamina	4	16					
6	Austria	Wolfgang Ötschmaier	Royal King of Darkness	8	8					
6	Austria	Simon Johann Zuchi	Apollo von Pachern	12						
6	Austria			12	28	40			1,250 €	10

(Top 6 of 15 Teams)
Grey penalties points do not count for the team result, in the second round only three riders per team are allowed to start.

==== FEI Nations Cup of Spain ====
CSIO 5* Gijón – August 31, 2010 to September 5, 2010 – Gijón, Spain
Competition: Friday, September 3, 2010 at 2:30 pm

	Team	Rider	Horse	Round A	Round B	Total penalties	Jump-off		Prize money €	scoring points
	Team	Rider	Horse	Penalties	Penalties	Total penalties	Penalties	Time (s)	Prize money €	scoring points
1	Belgium	Pieter Devos	Utopia van de Donkhoeve	0	8					
1	Belgium	Judy-Ann Melchior	Cha Cha Z	4	0					
1	Belgium	Dirk Demeersman	Bufero van het Panishof	8	0					
1	Belgium	Philippe Le Jeune	Boyante de Muze	0	did not start					
1	Belgium			4	8	12			20,000 €	12
2	Great Britain	David McPherson	Chamberlain Z	4	0					
2	Great Britain	Scott Brash	Intertoy Z	0	4					
2	Great Britain	Robert Bevis	Courtney	8	8					
2	Great Britain	Tim Stockdale	Kalico Bay	4	4					
2	Great Britain			8	8	16			10,000 €	-
2	France	Kevin Staut	Silvana	0	0					
2	France	Julien Epaillard	Mister Davier	12	4					
2	France	Marie Pellegrin-Etter	Admirable	0	8					
2	France	Penelope Leprevost	Topinambour	eliminated	did not start					
2	France			12	4	16			10,000 €	-
2	Canada	Ian Millar	Star Power	0	4					
2	Canada	Jenna Thompson	Zeke	4	8					
2	Canada	Keean White	Celena Z	12	8					
2	Canada	Eric Lamaze	Atlete van't Heike	0	0					
2	Canada			4	12	16			10,000 €	-
5	Ireland	Shane Breen	Carmena Z	8	0					
5	Ireland	Captain David O'Brien	Mo Chroi	0	8					
5	Ireland	Cian O'Connor	Splendor	8	0					
5	Ireland	Dermott Lennon	Hallmark Elite	4	8					
5	Ireland			12	8	20			5,000 €	-
5	Saudi Arabia	Abdullah Al-Sharbatly	Seldana di Campalto	8	4					
5	Saudi Arabia	Kamal Bahamdan	Cézanne	retired	9					
5	Saudi Arabia	Ramzy Al-Duhami	Jalla de Gaverie	0	8					
5	Saudi Arabia	Khaled Al-Eid	Presley Boy	0	0					
5	Saudi Arabia			8	12	20			5,000 €	-

(Top 6 of 11 Teams)
Grey penalties points do not count for the team result.

== Promotional League North and South America ==
=== Standings ===
The best-placed team of the 2010 Promotional League North and South America, Canada, have the permission to start in the 2010 Promotional League Final.

A team of a country that belongs to one of the 2010 Meydan FEI Nations Cup teams can not earn points in this league. Teams who are part of one of the other Promotional Leagues also can not earn points in this league.

	Team	Points			Total
	Team	CAN (Canada)	ARG (Argentina)	USA (United States)	Total
1	Canada	6.5	—	12	18.5
2	Mexico	8	—	10	18
3	Venezuela	—	—	6	6
4	Brazil	—	5	1	6
5	Colombia	—	—	5	5
6	Argentina	—	0.5	4	4.5
7	Chile	—	3	—	3

=== Results ===
==== FEI Nations Cup of Canada (2009) ====
CSIO 5* – September 9, 2009 to September 13, 2009 – Spruce Meadows, Calgary, Canada
Competition: Friday, September 11, 2009

	Team	Rider	Horse	Round A	Round B	Total penalties	Jump-off		scoring points
	Team	Rider	Horse	Penalties	Penalties	Total penalties	Penalties	Time (s)	scoring points
1	Netherlands	Angelique Hoorn	O'Brien	eliminated	withdrawn				
1	Netherlands	Harrie Smolders	Walnut de Muze	0	0				
1	Netherlands	Albert Zoer	Okidoki	0	0				
1	Netherlands	Marc Houtzager	Opium	0	1				
1	Netherlands			0	1	1			-
2	United States	Beezie Madden	Danny Boy	12	0				
2	United States	Ashlee Bond	Cadett	8	8				
2	United States	Lauren Hough	Quick Study	0	0				
2	United States	Richard Spooner	Cristallo	0	4				
2	United States			8	4	12			-
3	Mexico	Enrique Gonzalez	Frida	1	5				
3	Mexico	Nicolas Pizarro	Crossing Jordan	5	4				
3	Mexico	Federico Fernandez	Zorro	5	0				
3	Mexico	Antonio Chedraui	Don Porfirio	0	4				
3	Mexico			6	8	14			8
4	Switzerland	Pius Schwizer	Ulysse	0	4				
4	Switzerland	Theo Muff	Acomet	27	18				
4	Switzerland	Daniel Etter	Peu a Peu	9	5				
4	Switzerland	Steve Guerdat	Tresor	0	0				
4	Switzerland			9	9	18			-
4	Canada	Ian Millar	Redefin	17	1				
4	Canada	John Anderson	Terrific	5	12				
4	Canada	Beth Underhill	Top Gun	4	8				
4	Canada	Eric Lamaze	Hickstead	0	0				
4	Canada			9	9	18			6.5

(Top 5 of 10 Teams)

==== FEI Nations Cup of Argentina (2009) ====
CSIO 2*-W – November 4, 2009 to November 8, 2009 – Haras El Capricho, Capilla del Señor, Argentina
Competition: Friday, November 6, 2010 – Start: 3:30 pm, prize money: 15000 CHF

	Team	Rider	Horse	Round A	Round B	Total penalties	Jump-off		Prize CHF	scoring points
	Team	Rider	Horse	Penalties	Penalties	Total penalties	Penalties	Time (s)	Prize CHF	scoring points
1	Brazil I	Fernando Assis Costa	Tollile Ahorn	4	0					
1	Brazil I	Francisco Cirne Lima	Veto de Laubry	0	4					
1	Brazil I	Yuri Mansur Guerios	QH Ideal Hipos	4	4					
1	Brazil I	Stephan Barcha	Krisnee du Defey	0	eliminated		0	45.53		
1	Brazil I			4	8	12	0	45.53	7,500 CHF	5
2	United States	Laura Teodori	Kasoar d'Uxelles	0	0					
2	United States	Lacy Morrone-Cramer	Ulysses van de Krekebeke	8	8					
2	United States	Georgina Bloomberg	Metropolitan	4	0					
2	United States	Mario Deslauriers	Vicomte D	0	0		4	35.08		
2	United States			0	0	0	4	35.08	5,000 CHF	-
3	Chile	Christian Santis Guerrero	Fanatico de Huincul	4	0					
3	Chile	Carlos Morstadt Picasso	Talento	4	4					
3	Chile	Bernardo Naveillan	Marioso du Terral	4	0					
3	Chile	Carlos Milthaler	Almil Arsenica	12	eliminated					
3	Chile			12	4	16			2,500 CHF	3

(Top 3 of 6 Teams)

==== FEI Nations Cup of the United States ====
CSIO 4* – March 3, 2010 to March 7, 2010 – Wellington, Florida, United States
Competition: Friday, March 5, 2010

	Team	Rider	Horse	Round A	Round B	Total penalties	Jump-off		scoring points
	Team	Rider	Horse	Penalties	Penalties	Total penalties	Penalties	Time (s)	scoring points
1	Canada	Mac Cone	Ole	4					
1	Canada	Yann Candele	Pitareusa	0	0				
1	Canada	Beth Underhill	Top Gun	0	4				
1	Canada	Eric Lamaze	Ronaldo	0	1				
1	Canada			0	5	5			12
2	Mexico	Antonio Chedraui	Don Porfirio	5	0				
2	Mexico	Patricio Pasquel	Adriano M	20					
2	Mexico	Nicolas Pizarro	Crossing Jordan	4	0				
2	Mexico	Jaime Azcarraga	Celsius	0	4				
2	Mexico			9	4	13			10
3	Ireland	Kevin Babington	Souvenir	9	8				
3	Ireland	Richie Moloney	Brooke van de Zuuthoeve	5					
3	Ireland	Darragh Kenny	Obelix	4	4				
3	Ireland	Shane Sweetnam	Rolette	4	4				
3	Ireland			13	16	29			-
4	United States	Lauren Hough	Casadora	4	10				
4	United States	Ashlee Bond	Apache	1	8				
4	United States	Kent Farrington	United	0	8				
4	United States	McLain Ward	Amarosa	12					
4	United States			5	26	31			-
5	Germany	Andre Thieme	Antares F	4	8				
5	Germany	Alexander Hufenstuhl	Chamby	10	4				
5	Germany	Johannes Ehning	Salvador V	12	8				
5	Germany	Holger Hetzel	Lanzarote	eliminated					
5	Germany			26	20	46			-

(Top 5 of 11 Teams)

== Promotional League Middle East ==
=== Standings ===
The best-planced team of the 2010 Promotional League Middle East, the United Arab Emirates, have the permission to start in the 2010 Promotional League Final.

A team of a country that belongs to one of the 2010 Meydan FEI Nations Cup teams can not earn points in this league. Teams who are part of one of the other Promotional Leagues also can not earn points in this league.

	Team	Points	Total
	Team	UAE (United Arab Emirates)	Total
1	United Arab Emirates	8	8
2	Egypt	7	7
3	Saudi Arabia	3	3
4	Qatar	2	2

=== Results ===
==== FEI Nations Cup of the United Arab Emirates ====
CSIO 5* – February 4, 2010 to February 6, 2010 – Abu Dhabi, United Arab Emirates
Competition: Friday, February 5, 2010 – Start: 4:00 pm, prize money: 100,000 €

	Team	Rider	Horse	Round A	Round B	Total penalties	Jump-off		Prize €	scoring points
	Team	Rider	Horse	Penalties	Penalties	Total penalties	Penalties	Time (s)	Prize €	scoring points
1	United Kingdom	Ellen Whitaker	Ocolado	0	0					
1	United Kingdom	Guy Williams	Torinto van de Middlestede	0	0					
1	United Kingdom	Robert Smith	Talan	5	0					
1	United Kingdom	Ben Maher	Robin Hood W	0	did not start					
1	United Kingdom			0	0	0			30,000 €	-
2	Germany	Mario Stevens	Mac Kinley	0	0					
2	Germany	Max Kühner	Coeur de Lion	0	1					
2	Germany	Ulrich Kirchhoff	D'Avignon	11	4					
2	Germany	Lars Nieberg	Lord Luis	1	did not start					
2	Germany			1	5	6			20,000 €	-
3	Netherlands	Gert-Jan Bruggink	Wings	0	1					
3	Netherlands	Piet Raijmakers jr.	Rascin	4	4					
3	Netherlands	Gerco Schröder	New Orleans	0	0					
3	Netherlands			4	5	9			16,000 €	-
4	United Arab Emirates	H.H. Sheikha Latifa Al Maktoum	Kalaska de Semilly	1	0					
4	United Arab Emirates	Mohammed Al Hajiri	Shakira	4	13					
4	United Arab Emirates	Sheikh Shakboot Al Nahyan	Muscaris D'Ariel	5	8					
4	United Arab Emirates	Sheikh Majid Al Qassimi	Co-Jack	6	5					
4	United Arab Emirates			10	13	23			13,000 €	8
5	Egypt	Abdel Kader Said	Avenir	0	4					
5	Egypt	Mohamed Borai	Hope	5	9					
5	Egypt	Karim El Zoghby	Uleika	1	9					
5	Egypt			6	22	28			4,000 €	7

(Top 5 of 11 Teams)

The Italian team was together with the team of the United Arab Emirates on the fourth place in the final ranking. Because of a positive doping test by his horse Kanebo, Piergiorgio Bucci (one of the team member of the Italian team) was eliminated and suspended for 18 months. Because of this decision the six-placed team of Egypt move up to the fifth place.

== Promotional League Final ==
The best-placed team of the 2010 Promotional League Final move into the 2011 Meydan FEI Nations Cup.

== Sources / External links ==
- Standings of the 2010 Promotional Leagues
