= 2009 Promotional League Final =

The 2009 Promotional League Final was the final event of the 2009 FEI Nations Cup Promotional League and the first Promotional League Final ever. It was held in Barcelona (Spain) on September 20, 2009, during the 2009 CSIO Barcelona. Seven teams started the competition and the team from Spain won the event. A €90,000 purse was offered at this CSIO**** competition, with each of the six competing teams receiving a share.

The two best-placed teams in this competition move into the 2010 Meydan FEI Nations Cup. The national equestrian federation of Canada refrained the start in the Meydan FEI Nations Cup second time after 2009, so also Poland moved into the Meydan FEI Nations Cup for the 2010 season.

== Qualified and competing teams ==
The Competing teams of the 2009 Promotional League Final were:

- from Europe (the six best-placed nations of the Promotional League Europe):
  - Norway
  - Spain
  - Finland
  - Poland
  - Hungary
- form America (the best-placed nation of the Promotional League North and South America):
  - Canada

Austria and Denmark were qualified for the Promotional League Final 2009. They didn't start, so Hungary have the chance to start in the final.

== Result ==
	Team	Rider	Horse	Round A	Round B	Total penalties	Prize €
	Team	Rider	Horse	Penalties	Penalties	Total penalties	Prize €
1	Spain	Sergio Alvarez Moya	Wisconsin	0	4		
1	Spain	Pilar Lucrecia Cordon Muro	Herald	0	0		
1	Spain	Rutherford Latham	Guarana Champeix	5	0		
1	Spain	Ricardo Jurado	Julia des Brumes	0	Did not start		
1	Spain			0	4	4	€30,000
2	Canada	Amy Miller	Costa Rica Z	4	4		
2	Canada	Jenna Thompson	Zeke	4	12		
2	Canada	Jonathon Millar	Contino	0	4		
2	Canada	Keean White	Celena Z	16	0		
2	Canada			8	8	16	€25,000
3	Poland	Krzysztof Ludwiczak	My Lady	4	4		
3	Poland	Stanislaw Przedpelski	Love Parade	16	12		
3	Poland	Jan Chrzanowski	Just Cruising	12	16		
3	Poland	Aleksandra Lusina	Castello	1	8		
3	Poland			17	24	41	€15,000
4	Norway	Morten Djupvik	Bessemeind's Casino	24	16		
4	Norway	Geir Gulliksen	L'Espoir	8	4		
4	Norway	Connie Bull	Cezanne	16	17		
4	Norway	Stein Endresen	Le Beau	0	0		
4	Norway			24	20	44	€10,000
5	Finland	Maiju Mallat	St. Germain	8	8		
5	Finland	Noora Forsten	Campari	20	8		
5	Finland	Sebastian Numminen	Calandro	8	8		
5	Finland	Mikael Forsten	Isaac du Jonquet	8	4		
5	Finland			24	20	44	€5,000
6	Hungary	James Wingrave	Agropoint Crosshill	8	12		
6	Hungary	Zsófia Sirokai	Sissi	13	Eliminated		
6	Hungary	Balázs Hovárth	Eternally	16	16		
6	Hungary	Mariann Hugyecz	Cash	5	0		
6	Hungary			26	28	54	€5,000
