= 2009 FEI Nations Cup Promotional League =

The 2009 FEI Nations Cup Promotional League is the 2009 edition of the secondary international team Grand Prix show jumping competition run by the FEI. It is the follower of the (old) Nations Cup series. France won the (old) Nations Cup in the previous year. Sweden having been relegated from the 2008 Super League. because of new rules Sweden also start in the 2009 Meydan FEI Nations Cup.

Canada waived its right to participate in the 2009 Meydan FEI Nations Cup, so also Italy have been promoted to the 2009 Meydan FEI Nations Cup.

2009 is the first FEI Nations Cup Promotional League season with a Final. It was located at the CSIO Barcelona, in Barcelona, Spain, the location of the Samsung Super League Finals (2003 to 2008).

== Promotional League Europe ==
	Team	Points												Total
	Team	BEL (Belgium)	DEN (Denmark)	AUT (Austria)	POR (Portugal)	ROU (Romania)	BUL (Bulgaria)	NOR (Norway)	POL (Poland)	FIN (Finland)	ESP (Spain)	SVK (Slovakia)	TUR (Turkey)	Total
1	Norway	6	8	9	11	—	—	6	—	3	8.5	—	—	51.5
2	Spain	7	9	12	9	—	—	—	4.5	—	5	—	—	46.5
3	Austria	—	—	15	—	—	—	—	—	—	—	9	—	24
4	Denmark	—	5	—	—	—	—	4	8	6	—	—	—	23
5	Finland	1	7	—	—	—	—	0	—	2	—	12	—	22
6	Poland	—	—	4	—	—	—	—	6	—	—	11	—	21
7	Bulgaria	—	—	10	—	0.5	2	—	—	—	—	—	3	15.5
8	Hungary	—	—	3	—	2	3	—	—	—	—	7	—	15
9	Brazil	—	—	—	10	—	—	—	—	—	—	—	—	10
10	Czech Republic	—	—	—	—	—	—	—	—	—	—	8	—	8
11	Portugal	—	—	—	6	—	—	—	—	—	1	—	—	7
12	Syria	—	—	—	—	—	—	—	—	—	—	—	6	6
13	Estonia	—	—	2	—	—	—	—	—	—	—	4	—	6
14	Turkey	—	—	—	—	3	0.5	—	—	—	—	—	2	5.5
15	Greece	—	—	—	—	—	—	—	—	—	—	—	4	4
16	Belarus	—	—	—	—	—	—	—	—	—	—	2	—	2
17	Romania	—	—	—	—	0.5	0.5	—	—	—	—	—	1	2
18	Russia	—	1	—	—	—	—	—	—	—	—	—	—	1
18	Slovakia	—	—	—	—	—	—	—	—	—	—	1	—	1
18	Slovenia	—	—	1	—	—	—	—	—	—	—	—	—	1
		BEL (Belgium)	DEN (Denmark)	AUT (Austria)	POR (Portugal)	ROU (Romania)	BUL (Bulgaria)	NOR (Norway)	POL (Poland)	FIN (Finland)	ESP (Spain)	SVK (Slovakia)	TUR (Turkey)	

The 2009 Nations Cup event in Athens-Markopoulo (October 1, 2010 to October 4, 2010) because of time reasons part of the 2010 Promotional League Europe. The six best-placed teams in the final ranking have the chance to start in the 2009 Promotional League Final.

== Promotional League North and South America ==
The best-placed team of the 2009 Promotional League North and South America have the permission to start in the 2009 Promotional League Final. Only teams from North and South America (without Meydan FEI Nations Cup-Teams) can count points in the Promotional League North and South America.

The 2009 Promotional League North and South America consists only of the Nations Cup of the United States in Wellington, Florida. The Nations Cups of Canada and Argentina are because of time reasons part of the 2010 Promotional League North and South America.

	Team	Points	Total
	Team	USA (United States)	Total
1	Canada	9	9
2	Argentina	4	4
3	Venezuela	3	3
4	Mexico	1	1

== Promotional League Final ==
The two best-placed teams in the 2009 Promotional League Final move into the 2010 Meydan FEI Nations Cup. The national equestrian federation of Canada refrained the start in the Meydan FEI Nations Cup second time after 2009, so Spain and Poland moved into the Meydan FEI Nations Cup for the 2010 season.

Austria and Denmark were qualified for the 2009 Promotional League Final. They didn't start, so Hungary have the chance to start in the final.

	Team
1	Spain
2	Canada
3	Poland
4	Norway
5	Finland
6	Hungary

== Sources / external links ==
- Final standing of the 2009 Promotional League Europe
- Final standing of the 2009 Promotional League North and South America
- Final standing of the 2009 Promotional League Final
