= 2010 Promotional League Final =

The 2010 Promotional League Final was the Final event of the 2010 FEI Nations Cup Promotional League and the second Promotional League Final ever. It was held in Barcelona, Catalonia (Spain) on September 19, 2010 at 5:00 pm during the 2010 CSIO Barcelona. A €90,000 purse was offered at this CSIO 5* competition, with each of the eight competing teams receiving a share.

== Qualified and competing teams ==
The qualified teams of the 2010 Promotional League Final are:

- from Europe and other regions without own Promotional League (The second-placed to seventh-placed nations of the Promotional League Europe):
  - Italy
  - Norway
  - Denmark
  - Australia
  - Hungary
  - Greece
- from America (the best-placed nation of the Promotional League North and South America):
  - Canada
- from the Middle East (the best-placed nation of the Promotional League Middle East):
  - United Arab Emirates

The teams of Australia, Greece and the United Arab Emirates didn't start in the 2010 Promotional League Final. Because they didn't start, Austria (eight-placed nation of the Promotional League Europe) have the chance to start in the final.

Also Spain as host nation start in the 2010 Promotional League Final (Spain have no chance to move up to the 2011 Meydan FEI Nations Cup).

== Result ==
The best-placed team of this competition, Denmark, move into the 2011 Meydan FEI Nations Cup.

	Team	Rider	Horse	Round A	Round B		Total penalties	Prize money €
	Team	Rider	Horse	Penalties	Penalties	Time (s)	Total penalties	Prize money €
1	Denmark	Andreas Schou	Uno's Safier	0	8	77.00		
1	Denmark	Emilie Martinsen	Caballero	4	0	71.17		
1	Denmark	Thomas Sandgaard	Rubber Ball	4	0	73.95		
1	Denmark	Tina Lund	Zamiro	0	did not start			
1	Denmark			4	8		12	30,000 €
2	Spain	Alfredo Fernandez Duran	Gold Digger	4	8	69.60		
2	Spain	Cristina Toda	Cashmire	0	4	69.91		
2	Spain	Natalia Golding	Just Cruising	4	4	73.75		
2	Spain	Jesus Garmendia Echevarria	Moon Mail	4	0	76.58		
2	Spain			8	8	220.24	16	25,000 €
3	Canada	Jenna Thompson	Zeke	0	8	74.08		
3	Canada	Yann Candele	Atlete van't Heike	4	0	75.69		
3	Canada	Keean White	Celena Z	8	4	75.92		
3	Canada	Ian Millar	Star Power	4	4	76.76		
3	Canada			8	8	228.37	16	15,000 €
4	Italy	Lucia Vizzini	Quinta Roo	0	12	73.02		
4	Italy	Fabio Brotto	R-Gitana	4	0	72.48		
4	Italy	Luca Maria Moneta	Neptune Brecourt	4	4	78.49		
4	Italy	Giuseppe D'Onofrio	Lagerfeld	4	8	78.09		
4	Italy			8	12		20	4,000 €
5	Norway	Nina Braaten	Blue Loyd	0	16	83.30		
5	Norway	Geir Gulliksen	L'Espoir	8	4	76.40		
5	Norway	Nicholai Lindbjerg	Coquette	0	4	79.46		
5	Norway	Stein Endresen	Hoyo de Monterey	12	8	73.60		
5	Norway			8	16		24	4,000 €
6	Austria	Stefan Eder	Chilli van Dijk	8	0	73.93		
6	Austria	Wolfgang Ötschmaier	Royal King of Darkness	8	32	77.20		
6	Austria	Claudia Neureiter	Moon de Reis	12	12	76.57		
6	Austria	Christian Schranz	Lualdi	0	8	76.42		
6	Austria			16	20		36	4,000 €
7	Finland	Satu Liukkonen	Qui Vivra Verra	12	20	74.55		
7	Finland	Anna-Julia Kontio	Eafons Escape	0	4	76.09		
7	Finland	Sebastian Numminen	Calandro	8	8	75.42		
7	Finland	Nina Fagerstrom	Talent	4	did not start			
7	Finland			16	32		44	4,000 €
8	Hungary	James Wingrave	Sissi	8	4	70.91		
8	Hungary	Mariann Hugyecz	Laslui	12	8	75.33		
8	Hungary	Gyula Szuhai	Santiago	16	24	81.38		
8	Hungary	Sándor Szász	Goldwing	4	did not start			
8	Hungary			24	36		60	4,000 €
