= 2008 Samsung FEI Nations Cup Promotional League =

The 2008 Samsung FEI Nations Cup Promotional League was the 2008 edition of the second division of the Samsung Super League, an international team Grand Prix show jumping competition run by the FEI. Ireland won the Promotional League the previous year and had been promoted to the 2008 Samsung Super League. France joined the series, having been relegated from the 2007 Samsung Super League.

Before the beginning of the 2009 season of the Meydan FEI Nations Cup (the follower of the Samsung Super League), the number of participating nations teams in the Meydan FEI Nations Cup has been increased up to ten. Thus, after the descent of Sweden, three nations starting positions are reassigned. This was done by the placement of best placed show jumpers from every nation in the world rankings. The emerging nations to the 2009 Meydan FEI Nations Cup were Sweden, France and Canada. The national equestrian federation of Canada refrained, so Italy moved into the Meydan FEI Nations Cup for the 2009 season.

== Standings ==
The points of the seven best results of each nation are added to the final result.

	Team	Points																						Total
	Team	USA (United States)	BEL (Belgium)	HUN (Hungary)	AUT (Austria)	DEN (Denmark)		POR (Portugal)	ROM (Romania)	POL (Poland)	BUL (Bulgaria)	FIN (Finland)	NOR (Norway)	SLO (Slovenia)	TUR (Turkey)	EST (Estonia)	SWE (Sweden)	SVK (Slovakia)	CAN (Canada)	CZE (Czech Republic)	CRO (Croatia)	GRE (Greece)	ARG (Argentina)	Total
1	France	(5.5)	15	—	(7.5)	DEN (Denmark)		10	—	—	—	—	—	—	—	—	10	14	—	16	14	—	—	92
2	Italy	—	15	(7)	12	DEN (Denmark)		(7)	—	(7)	—	—	—	(8)	—	(8)	10	11	(5)	14	12	(9)	—	84
3	Denmark	—	—	—	—	DEN (Denmark)		—	—	14	—	6	6	—	—	—	13	—	—	11	—	—	—	64
4	Norway	—	18	—	—	8	14	—	—	(1)	—	3	(2)	—	—	7	7	—	4	—	—	—	—	61
5	Poland	—	—	6	4	7	—	—	—	9.5	—	—	—	(2)	—	10	—	8	—	(5.5)	(3)	6	—	46.5
6	Austria	—	8	4	9	—	—	—	—	—	—	—	—	9	—	—	—	9	—	4	7	—	—	46
7	Canada	11	15	—	—	—	9	—	—	—	—	—	—	—	—	—	—	—	10	—	—	—	—	45
8	Hungary	—	—	9	5	—	—	—	4	—	0	—	—	3	—	—	—	12	—	8	4	—	—	45
9	Spain	—	4	—	7.5	—	11	11	—	—	—	—	—	—	—	—	—	—	—	—	—	—	—	33.5
10	Mexico	10	9	—	—	—	12	—	—	—	—	—	—	—	—	—	—	—	—	—	—	—	—	31
11	Brazil	—	—	5	2	—	—	8	—	4	—	—	—	—	—	—	6	—	—	—	—	—	1	26
12	Estonia	—	—	—	—	5	—	—	—	3	—	—	—	—	—	6	—	10	—	—	—	—	—	24
13	Finland	—	—	—	—	4	—	—	—	—	—	4	3	—	—	5	—	6	—	0	—	—	—	22
14	Turkey	—	—	—	—	—	—	—	3	—	6	—	—	—	6	—	—	—	—	—	—	5	—	20
15	Bulgaria	—	—	3	—	—	—	—	1	—	8	—	—	—	3	—	—	—	—	1.5	1	1	—	18.5
16	Argentina	4	—	—	—	—	4	5	—	—	—	—	—	—	—	—	—	—	—	—	—	—	4	17
17	Slovakia	—	—	—	—	—	—	—	—	—	—	—	—	5	—	—	—	4	—	1.5	6	—	—	16.5
18	Czech Republic	—	—	—	—	—	—	—	—	—	—	—	—	6	—	—	—	3	—	7	—	—	—	16
19	Slovenia	—	—	2	—	—	—	—	—	—	—	—	—	4	—	—	—	1	—	0	5	2	—	14
20	New Zealand	5.5	—	—	—	—	—	—	—	6	—	—	—	—	—	—	—	—	—	—	—	—	—	11.5
21	Portugal	—	—	—	—	—	6	4	—	—	—	—	—	—	—	—	—	—	—	—	—	—	—	10
22	Syria	—	—	—	—	—	—	—	—	—	4	—	—	—	4	—	—	—	—	—	—	—	—	8
23	Greece	—	—	—	—	—	—	—	—	—	3	—	—	—	2	—	—	—	—	—	—	3	—	8
24	Romania	—	—	1	—	—	—	—	2	—	0	—	—	—	1	—	—	—	—	—	—	4	—	8
25	Venezuela	7	—	—	—	—	—	—	—	—	—	—	—	—	—	—	—	—	—	—	—	—	—	7
26	Ukraine	—	—	—	6	—	—	—	—	—	—	—	—	—	—	—	—	—	—	—	—	—	—	6
27	Saudi Arabia	—	5	—	—	—	—	—	—	—	—	—	—	—	—	—	—	—	—	—	—	—	—	5
27	Serbia	—	—	—	—	—	—	—	—	—	5	—	—	—	—	—	—	—	—	—	—	—	—	5
29	Croatia	—	—	—	—	—	—	—	—	—	—	—	—	1	—	—	—	2	—	—	2	—	—	5
30	Lithuania	—	—	—	—	—	—	—	—	—	—	—	—	—	—	4	—	—	—	—	—	—	—	4
31	Latvia	—	—	—	—	—	—	—	—	—	—	—	—	—	—	3	—	—	—	—	—	—	—	3
31	Chile	—	—	—	—	—	—	—	—	—	—	—	—	—	—	—	—	—	—	—	—	—	3	3
33	Japan	—	—	—	—	1	—	—	—	—	—	—	—	—	—	—	—	—	—	—	—	—	—	1
33	Russia	—	—	—	—	—	—	—	—	—	—	—	—	—	—	1	—	—	—	—	—	—	—	1
35	Hong Kong	—	—	—	0	—	—	—	—	—	—	—	—	—	—	—	—	—	—	—	—	—	—	0
		USA (United States)	BEL (Belgium)	HUN (Hungary)	AUT (Austria)	DEN (Denmark)	ESP (Spain)	POR (Portugal)	ROM (Romania)	POL (Poland)	BUL (Bulgaria)	FIN (Finland)	NOR (Norway)	SLO (Slovenia)	TUR (Turkey)	EST (Estonia)	SWE (Sweden)	SVK (Slovakia)	CAN (Canada)	CZE (Czech Republic)	CRO (Croatia)	GRE (Greece)	ARG (Argentina)	

== Sources / External links ==
- Final standing of the 1970 Nations Cup
- results of the nations cups in the 2008 Nations Cup season
