= Kent Farrington =

American equestrian (born 1980)

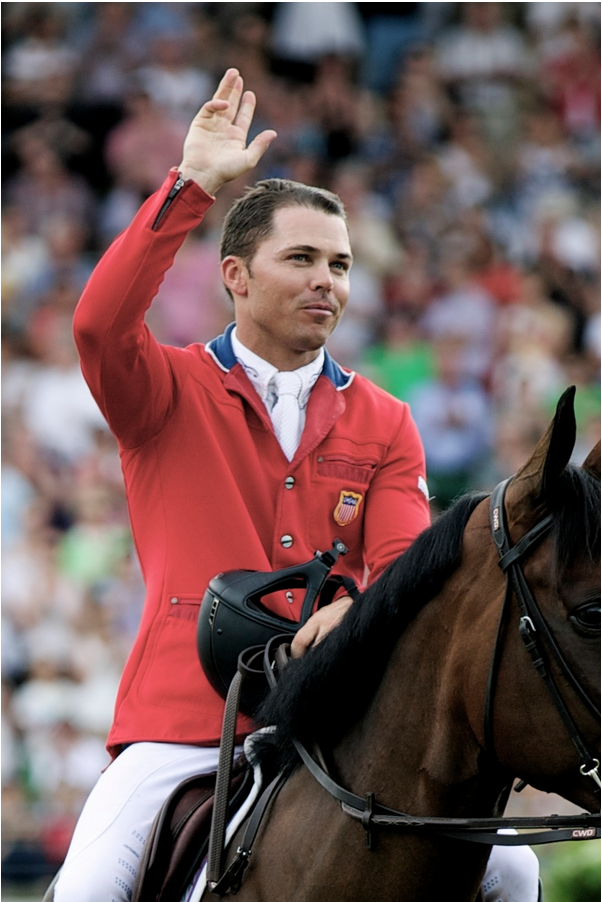
- Kent Farrington and Blue Angel - Aachen

Personal information
- Nationality: American
- Citizenship: USA
- Born: Kent Philip Farrington; December 28, 1980 (age 45) Chicago, IL
- Occupation: Professional Show Jumper
- Website: www.kentfarrington.com

Sport
- Country: USA
- Sport: Show Jumping
- Rank: 2 (April 2026)
Medal record
Equestrian
Representing United States
Olympic Games
Silver medal – second place	2016 Rio de Janeiro	Team jumping
World Championships
Bronze medal – third place	2014 Normandy	Team jumping
Pan American Games
Gold medal – first place	2011 Guadalajara	Team jumping
Gold medal – first place	2023 Santiago	Team jumping
Silver medal – second place	2023 Santiago	Individual jumping
Bronze medal – third place	2015 Toronto	Team jumping

Kent Philip Farrington (born December 28, 1980) is an American show jumping rider. He has represented the United States in international competition, including the Olympic Games, FEI World Equestrian Games, FEI Jumping World Cup Finals, and Nations Cup events. Farrington has held the World No. 1 position in the FEI Longines Rankings on multiple occasions and has consistently ranked among the world's leading show jumping riders.

Farrington is recognized as one of the most successful Grand Prix riders in modern show jumping. According to data from Jumpr, as reported by Horse Network in June 2024, Farrington recorded 30 CSI5* Grand Prix victories, establishing him as the winningest five-star Grand Prix rider globally over the preceding decade. His victories include some of the sport's most prestigious competitions across North America and Europe.

Based in Wellington, Florida, Farrington owns and operates Kent Farrington LLC, where he trains and develops international show jumping horses. He is widely recognized for his ability to develop and campaign horses at the highest level of the sport, building successful partnerships with multiple championship-caliber mounts throughout his career.

During the 2025 season, Farrington returned to the top of the FEI Longines World Rankings following a series of CSI5* Grand Prix victories with multiple horses, led by the Oldenburg mare Greya. The partnership enjoyed one of the most successful seasons in modern show jumping. Greya recorded seven CSI5* Grand Prix victories during the 2025 calendar year, surpassing the previous single-season record of six five-star Grand Prix wins set by Farrington's former Olympic mount, Gazelle, in 2017. Farrington also established a new single-season record for five-star Grand Prix and World Cup victories by a rider, recording nine wins during the year.

In April 2026, Farrington and Greya won the Longines FEI Jumping World Cup Final in Fort Worth, Texas, securing Farrington's first World Cup Final title. The victory further cemented the pair's status among the sport's leading horse-and-rider combinations following their record-breaking 2025 season.

== Current horses ==
Name	Born	Sex	Breed	Sire	Dam	Owner
Casynna	2017	Mare	Hanoverian	Casino Berlin	Violette	Kent Farrington LLC and Haity McNerney
Descartes SR	2017	Gelding	Mexican Sport Horse	Carmelo	Wida Jana	Kent Farrington LLC and Robinson Ridge LLC
Greya	2014	Mare	Oldenburg	Colestus	Contessa 128	Kent Farrington LLC
Toulayna	2014	Mare	Zangersheide	Toulon	Vuelta	Kent Farrington LLC & Rabbit Root Stables LLC
Nikki Angel	2018	Mare	Anglo European	Fruselli	Hocolada	Kent Farrington LLC & Robinson Ridge LLC
Dolores PS	2018	Mare	Oldenburg	Dominator 2000 Z	Georgina	Kent Farrington LLC
Rexton	2017	Gelding	Oldenburg	Diaron Old	Chayonda Girl	Kent Farrington LLC

== Results ==
=== 2026 ===
Date	Placing	Horse	Competition	Category	Show	Location
October 4, 2026	1	Rexton	$116,500 1.50m Discovery Land Company Masters 3* Grand Prix	CSI 3*	Highlands Hudson Valley	Amenia, NY (USA)
September 27, 2026	1	Descartes SR	$340,000 CSI5* Grand Prix of Greenwich	CSI 5*	MLSJ Greenwich	Greenwich, CT (USA)
September 25, 2026	1	Rexton	$200,000 MLSJ CSI5* Team Competition	CSI 5*	MLSJ Greenwich	Greenwich, CT (USA)
September 11, 2026	1	Rexton	$200,000 MLSJ Team Competition CSI5*	CSI 5*	MLSJ Traverse City	Williamsburg, MI (USA)
September 10, 2026	1	Nikki Angel	Traverse City Record-Eagle Welcome CSI2*	CSI 2*	MLSJ Traverse City	Williamsburg, MI (USA)
September 6, 2026	1	Dolores PS	$116,500 Agero & Silver Silver Oak Grand Prix	CSI 3*	Silver Oak Jumper Tournament	Williamsburg, MI (USA)
September 4, 2026	1	Vixen	Leons CSI2* Qualifier	CSI 2*	MLSJ Angelstone	Rockwood, ON (Canada)
September 3, 2026	1	Descartes SR	$250,000 BFL Canada CSI5 Qualifier	CSI 5*	MLSJ Angelstone	Rockwood, ON (Canada)
September 3, 2026	1	Rexton	CSI4* Opening Speed Class	CSI 5*	MLSJ Angelstone	Rockwood, ON (Canada)
August 30, 2026	1	Greya	$400,000 Longines Hampton Classic Grand Prix CSI5*	CSI 5*	Hampton Classic	Bridgehampton, NY
August 20, 2026	1	Dolores PS	Old Salem Farm CSI2* Classic	CSI 2*	Old Salem Farm Summer Jumper Classic	North Salem, NY
August 19, 2026	1	Dolores PS	Old Salem Farm CSI2* Classic	CSI 2*	Old Salem Farm Summer Jumper Classic	North Salem, NY
July 2, 2026	1	Diakatisa	CSI3* Welcome Stake	CSI 3*	Traverse City Spring Series	Williamsburg, MI (USA)
June 19, 2026	1	Diakatisa	CSI 3* Speed	CSI 3*	Traverse City Spring Series	Williamsburg, MI (USA)
April 25, 2026	1	Descartes SR	$340,000 Kentucky International CSI5* Grand Prix	CSI 5*	Kentucky International (MLSJ)	Lexington, KY (USA)
April 12, 2026	1	Greya	Longines FEI Jumping World Cup Final- Competition III	CSI-W	FEI World Cup Finals	Ft. Worth, TX (USA)
April 10, 2026	1	Greya	Longines FEI Jumping World Cup Final- Competition II	CSI-W	FEI World Cup Finals	Ft. Worth, TX (USA)
April 9, 2026	1	Toulayna	Longines FEI Jumping World Cup Final- Competition I	CSI-W	FEI World Cup Finals	Ft. Worth, TX (USA)
March 28, 2026	1	Greya	$1,000,000 Rolex US Equestrian Open Grand Prix CSI5*	CSI5*	WEF Rolex Finale Week	Wellington, FL (USA)
February 18, 2026	1	Casynna	LaMieux Speed Challenge CSI4*	CSI4*	WEC Ocala Winter Spectacular	Ocala, FL (USA)
January 29, 2026	1	Orafina	$117,000 Morning Star Sport Horses CSI5-W Qualifier	CSI5-W	Desert Circuit 4	Thermal, CA (USA)
January 22, 2026	1	Orafina	$117,000 Pomponio CSI5* Welcome	CSI5*	Desert Circuit 3	Thermal, CA (USA)
January 8, 2026	1	Orafina	Florida Coast Equipment Grand Prix Qualifier CSI3*	CSI 3*	WEC Ocala Winter Spectacular	Ocala, FL (USA)

=== 2025 ===
Date	Placing	Horse	Competition	Category	Show	Location
February 1, 2025	1	Toulayna	5* Longings World Cup Jumping of Thermal	CSI 5*	Thermal (CA)	Thermal, CA (USA)
February 22, 2025	1	Greya	$500,000 Lugano Grand Prix CSI5*	CSI 5*	Winter Equestrian Festival	Wellington, FL (USA)
February 23, 2025	1	Grass De Mars	Hermes CSI 5* 1.50m Classic	CSI 5*	Winter Equestrian Festival	Wellington, FL (USA)
February 27, 2025	1	Grass Dr Mars	$117,000 MARS Equestrian 1.50m Grand Prix Qualifier CSI4*	CSI 4*	Ocala Winter Spectacular	Ocala, FL (USA)
March 1, 2025	1	Toulayna	$200,000 MARS Equestrian 1.55m Grand Prix Qualifier CSI 4*	CSI 4*	Ocala Winter Spectacular	Ocala, FL (USA)
April 11, 2025	1	Myla	Arthramid Vet Grand Prix Qualifier CSI 3*	CSI 3*	ESP Spring	Wellington, FL (USA)
April 26, 2025	1	Greya	Kentucky International Grand Prix CSI 5*	CSI 5*	Kentucky International	Lexington, KY (USA)
May 8, 2025	1	Orafina	Spring Classic 1.50mCSI 3*	CSI 3*	Kentucky Spring Horse Show	Lexington, KY (USA)
July 2, 2025	1	Myla	CSIO 5* Turkish Airlines- Prize of Europe	CSI-O 5*	CHIO Aachen 2025	Aachen, Germany
July 17, 2025	1	Orafina	FEI CSI3* Welcome	CSI3*	HITS Hudson Valley IV	Saugerties, NY (USA)
July 24, 2025	1	Kanny-Fee	CSI3* Welcome Stake	CSI3*	HITS Hudson Valley V	Saugerties, NY (USA)
July 31, 2025	1	Grass De Mars	CSI3* Welcome Stake	CSI3*	HITS Hudson Valley VI	Saugerties, NY (USA)
August 9, 2025	1	Greya	$340,000 B&D Builders CSI5* Grand Prix (MLSJ)	CSI5*	MLSJ- Traverse City	Williamsburg, MI (USA)
August 21, 2025	1	Myla	BFL Canada CSI5* Qualifier (MLSJ)	CSI5*	MLSJ- Toronto	Toronto (Canada)
September 4, 2025	1	Orafina	CSI3* Welcome	CSI3*	HITS Hudson Valley VIII	Saugerties, NY (USA)
September 6, 2025	1	Grass De Mars	$125,000 Core Specialty Insurance Grand Prix	CSI3*	HITS Hudson Valley VIII	Saugerties, NY (USA)
September 14, 2025	1	Greya	$340,000 Longines FEI Jumping World Cup CSI5-W	CSI5-W	Traverse City Tournament of Champions	Williamsburg, MI (USA)
September 21, 2025	1	Greya	$340,000 American Gold Cup CSI5*	CSI5*	American Gold Cup	Williamsburg, MI (USA)
September 28, 2025	1	Toulayna	$340,000 CSI5* Grand Prix of Greenwich	CSI5* (MLSJ)	MLSJ Greenwich	Greenwich, CT (USA)
November 30, 2025	1	Greya	$200,000 Holiday and Horses CSI4* Grand Prix	CSI4*	Holiday and Horses	Wellington, FL (USA)
December 14, 2025	1	Greya	Roles Grand Prix of Geneva CSI5*	CSI5*	CHI Geneva	Geneva (Switzerland)

=== 2024 ===
Date	Placing	Horse	Competition	Category	Show	Location
December 1, 2024	1	Greya	Holiday and Horses CSI4* Grand Prix	CSI4*	Wellington International	Wellington, FL (USA)
September 20, 2024	1	Toulayna	$181,170 FEI 5* 1.55m Qualifier	CSI5*	MLSJ-Traverse City	Williamsburg, MI (USA)
September 15, 2024	1	Greya	Longines FEI Jumping World Cup Traverse City	CSI5*-W	Traverse City	Williamsburg, MI (USA)
September 15, 2024	1	Greya	Longines FEI Jumping World Cup Traverse City	CSI5*-W	Traverse City	Williamsburg, MI (USA)
September 6, 2024	1	Greya	Rolex Grand Prix Ville de La Baule	CSIO5*	CSIO5* La Baule	La Baule, FRA
April 20, 2024	4	Greya	FEI Jumping World Cup Final	CSI-W Final	FEI Jumping World Cup	Riyadh, Saudi Arabia
February 8, 2024	1	Toulayna	$116,100 Adequan® CSI5* WEF Challenge Cup CSI 5*	CSI5*	Winter Equestrian Festival	Wellington, FL (USA)
February 2, 2024	1	Landon De Nyze	$62,500 Adequan® CSI4* WEF Challenge Cup	CSI4*	Winter Equestrian Festival	Wellington, FL (USA)

=== 2023 ===
Date	Placing	Horse	Competition	Category	Show	Location
April 30, 2023	1	Landon	Grand Prix	CSIO5*	FEI Jumping Nations Cup of Mexico	San Miguel de Allende (MEX)
March 18, 2023	1	Toulayna	Grand Prix	CSI4*	Winter Equestrian Festival	Wellington, FL (USA)
February 25, 2023	1	Dagny	Grand Prix	CSI2*	Terranova Equestrian Center	Sarasota, FL (USA)
February 19, 2023	1	Orafina	Grand Prix	CSI4*	Desert International Horse Park	Thermal, CA (USA)
January 22, 2023	1	Landon	Grand Prix	CSI3*	Winter Equestrian Festival	Wellington, FL (USA)

=== 2022 ===
Date	Placing	Horse	Competition	Category	Show	Location
December 9, 2022	1	Orafina	CWD 1.50m	CSI4*	Desert International Horse Park	Thermal, CA (USA)
November 9, 2022	1	Austria 2	International Strength and Speed Challenge	CSI5*-W	Royal Horse Show	Toronto, ON (CAN)
October 22, 2022	1	Orafina	Grand Prix	CSI3*	Tryon International Equestrian Center	Tryon, NC (USA)
September 8, 2022	1	Creedance	ATCO Cup	CSIO5*	Spruce Meadows	Calgary, AB (CAN)
September 2, 2022	1	Gazelle	1.50	CSI5*	Spruce Meadows	Calgary, AB (CAN)
August 28, 2022	1	Orafina	RBC Grand Prix	CSI5*	Wesley Clover Parks	Ottawa, AB (CAN)
July 8, 2022	1	Orafina	Scotiabank Cup	CSI5*	Spruce Meadows	Calgary, AB (CAN)
July 3, 2022	1	Chato Lou	West Canadian Cup Grand Prix	CSI2*	Spruce Meadows	Calgary, AB (CAN)
July 2, 2022	1	Orafina	Canadian Utilities Cup	CSI5*	Spruce Meadows	Calgary, AB (CAN)
June 18, 2022	1	Orafina	RBC Capital Markets Cup	CSI5*	Spruce Meadows	Calgary, AB (CAN)
June 4, 2022	1	Orafina	Grand Prix	CSIO5*	Thunderbird Show Park	Langley, BC (CAN)
June 2, 2022	1	Chato Lou	Happy Welcome	CSIO5*	Thunderbird Show Park	Langley, BC (CAN)
April 16, 2022	1	Orafina	Grand Prix	CSI3*	Equestrian Sport Productions	Wellington, FL (USA)
March 10, 2022	1	Orafina	WEF Challenge Cup Round IX	CSI5*	Winter Equestrian Festival	Wellington, FL (USA)
February 13, 2022	1	Easy Girl	1.50m Championship	CSI5*	Winter Equestrian Festival	Wellington, FL (USA)

=== 2021 ===
Date	Placing	Horse	Competition	Category	Show	Location
December 9, 2021	1	Creedance	Trophée de Geneve	CSI5*	CHI Geneva	Geneva (SUI)
November 14, 2021	1	Gazelle	FEI Jumping World Cup Lexington	CSI4*	National Horse Show	Lexington, KY (USA)
October 17, 2021	1	Austria 2	Grand Prix	CSI5*	Arenamend Classic	White Sulphur Springs, WV (USA)
September 4, 2021	1	Gazelle	RBC Grand Prix	CSI5*	Spruce Meadows	Calgary, AB (CAN)
July 3, 2021	1	Creedance	Kingdom of Bahrain Stakes	CSI5*	Royal Windsor Horse Show	Windsor (ENG)
June 20, 2021	1	Gazelle	Hubside Grand Prix	CSI5*	St Tropez - Grimaud	Grimaud (FRA)
June 3, 2021	1	Orafina	Horseware Ireland Welcome Stake	CSI3*	Tryon Spring	Tryon, NC (USA)
May 29, 2021	1	Creedance	ENI Small Grande Prix	CSIO5*	Piazza di Siena	Rome (ITA)
May 27, 2021	1	Creedance	Land Rover Speed	CSIO5*	Piazza di Siena	Rome (ITA)
Mar 14, 2021	1	Creedance	CaptiveOne Advisors 1.50m Classic	CSI5*	Winter Equestrian Festival	Wellington, FL (USA)
Jan 31, 2021	1	Austria 2	Netjets Grand Grand Prix	CSI3*	Winter Equestrian Festival	Wellington, FL (USA)
Jan 29, 2021	1	Austria 2	Adequan® WEF Challenge Cup Round 3	CSI3*	Winter Equestrian Festival	Wellington, FL (USA)

=== 2020 ===
Date	Placing	Horse	Competition	Category	Show	Location
Nov 25, 2020	1	Austria 2	Holiday & Horses 1.45m Opener	CSI4*	ESP Holiday & Horses	Wellington, FL (USA)
Nov 15, 2020	1	Kaprice	Noltrex®Vet Grand Prix	CSI3*	ESP Pre-Charity CSI3*	Wellington, FL (USA)
Oct 29, 2020	1	Creedance	Phelps Media Group International Welcome Stake	CSI4*	National Horse Show	Lexington, KY (USA)
Sept 14, 2020	1	Gazelle	American Gold Cup Grand Prix	CSI4*	American Gold Cup	Traverse City, MI (USA)
Sept 6, 2020	1	Creedance	Silver Oak Jumper Tournament Grand Prix	CSI2*	American Gold Cup	Traverse City, MI (USA)
Aug 6, 2020	1	Austria 2	CWD Welcome Stake	CSI3*	Great Lakes Equestrian Festival	Traverse City, MI (USA)
July 18, 2020	1	Kaprice	Equisafe Global Grand Prix	CSI3*	Tryon Summer	Tryon, NC (USA)
Feb 6, 2020	1	Austria 2	WEF Challenge Cup round 5	CSI5*	Winter Equestrian Festival	Wellington, FL (USA)
Feb 1, 2020	1	Creedance	Marshall & Sterling/Great American Grand Prix	CSI4*	Winter Equestrian Festival	Wellington, FL (USA)
Jan 16, 2020	1	Kaprice	Equinimity WEF Challenge Cup Round II	CSI2*	Winter Equestrian Festival	Wellington, FL (USA)

=== 2019 ===
Date	Placing	Horse	Competition	Category	Show	Location
Dec 13, 2019	1	Austria 2	Rolex IJRC Top Ten Final	CSI5*	CHI de Genève	Geneva (SUI)
Dec 12, 2019	1	Creedance	Trophée de Genève	CSI5*	CHI de Genève	Geneva (SUI)
Nov 6, 2019	1	Austria 2	Jolera International Strength and Speed Challenge	CSI4* W	Royal Horse Show	Toronto, ON (CAN)
Sept 29, 2019	1	Creedance	€150,000 Global Champions League Final	CSI5*	GCT New York	New York, NY (USA)
Sept 28, 2019	1	Creedance	Second GCL Speed Class	CSI5*	GCT New York	New York, NY (USA)
Sept 14, 2019	1	Creedance	Second GCL Speed Class	CSI5*	Athina Onassis Horse Show	Saint Tropez (FRA)
Sept 5, 2019	1	Jasper	ATCO Solutions Cup	CSI5*	Spruce Meadows	Calgary, AB (CAN)
July 21, 2019	1	Gazelle	Rolex Grand Prix	CSIO5*	CHIO Aachen	Aachen (GER)
June 28, 2019	1	Jasper	Friends of the Meadows Cup	CSI5*	Spruce Meadows	Calgary, AB (CAN)
June 14, 2019	1	Creedance	Scotiabank Cup	CSI5*	Spruce Meadows	Calgary, AB (CAN)
May 25, 2019	1	Gazelle	Loro Piana Grand Prix	CSIO5*	Piazza di Siena	Rome (ITA)
Apr 18, 2019	1	Creedance	First GCL Individual Class	CSI5*	GCT Miami Beach	Miami, FL (USA)

=== 2018 ===
Date	Placing	Horse	Competition	Category	Show	Location
Dec 8, 2018	1	Creedance	Credit Suisse Grand Prix	CSI5*	CHI de Genève	Geneva (SUI)
Nov 1, 2018	1	Creedance	International Jumper Classic	CSI4*	CP National Horse Show	Lexington, KY (USA)
Oct 14, 2018	1	Gazelle	Adequan® Grand Prix	CSI3*	Tryon Fall 3	Tryon, NC (USA)
Oct 11, 2018	1	Creedance	Horseware Ireland Welcome Stake	CSI3*	Tryon Fall 3	Tryon, NC (USA)
Aug 26, 2018	1	Gazelle	Jumping International de Valence	CSI5*	Jumping International de Valence	Valence (FRA)
Jul 8, 2018	1	Jasper	Imperial Winning Round	CSI5*	Spruce Meadows	Calgary, AB (CAN)
Jul 5, 2018	1	Creedance	ATCO Cup	CSI5*	Spruce Meadows	Calgary, AB (CAN)
Jun 10, 2018	1	Gazelle	RBC Grand Prix	CSI5*	Spruce Meadows	Calgary, AB (CAN)
June 7, 2018	1	Jasper	PwC Cup	CSI5*	Spruce Meadows	Calgary, AB (CAN)

=== 2017 ===
Date	Placing	Horse	Competition	Category	Show	Location
Dec 10, 2017	1	Gazelle	Rolex Grand Prix	CSI5*	CHI de Genève	Geneva (SUI)
Nov 8, 2017	1	Voyeur	Longines FEI World Cup Jumping Toronto	CSI4* W	Royal Horse Show	Toronto, ON (CAN)
Oct 21, 2017	1	Gazelle	Rolex Grand Prix	CSI5*	Tryon Fall	Tryon, NC (USA)
Sep 23, 2017	1	Voyeur	New Albany Classic Invitational Grand Prix	CSI2*	New Albany Classic	New Albany, OH (USA)
Sep 22, 2017	1	Creedance	U.S. Open Grand Prix	CSI3*	Rolex Central Park Horse Show	New York, NY (USA)
Sep 8, 2017	1	Gazelle	Friends of the Meadows Cup	CSI5*	Spruce Meadows	Calgary, AB (CAN)
Aug 20, 2017	1	Gazelle	Grand Prix of Valence	CSI5*	Jumping International de Valence	Valence (FRA)
Aug 20, 2017	1	Baltic Star 2	1.45 MMA/SFAM Grand Prix	CSI5*	Jumping International de Valence	Valence (FRA)
Jul 21, 2017	1	Uceko	Prize of North Rhine-Westphalia	CSI5*	CHIO Aachen	Aachen (GER)
Jul 8, 2017	1	Gazelle	ATCO Queen Elizabeth II Cup	CSI5*	Spruce Meadows	Calgary, AB (CAN)
Jul 5, 2017	1	Uceko	PwC Cup	CSI5*	Spruce Meadows	Calgary, AB (CAN)
Jul 5, 2017	1	Dublin	Kubota Cup	CSI5*	Spruce Meadows	Calgary, AB (CAN)
Jun 15, 2017	1	Uceko	Husky Energy Cup	CSI5*	Spruce Meadows	Calgary, AB (CAN)
Jun 8, 2017	1	Gazelle	ATB Financial Cup	CSI5*	Spruce Meadows	Calgary, AB (CAN)
May 20, 2017	1	Gazelle	LGCT Grand Prix of Madrid	CSI5*	Madrid Horse Week	Madrid (ESP)
May 14, 2017	1	Sherkan d'Amaury	Rolex Grand Prix	CSI5*	Royal Windsor Horse Show	Windsor (ENG)
Apr 20, 2017	1	Sherkan d'Amaury	1.50m Speed	CSI5*	Jumping Antwerp	Antwerpen (BEL)
Apr 15, 2017	1	Creedance	€270,000 Global Champions League Final	CSI5*	GCT Miami Beach	Miami, FL (USA)
Mar 25, 2017	1	Dublin	$130,000 Suncast 1.50m Championship Jumper Classic Final	CSI5*	Winter Equestrian Festival	Wellington, FL (USA)
Feb 23, 2017	1	Creedance	$130,000 Ruby et Violette WEF Challenge Cup	CSI5*	Winter Equestrian Festival	Wellington, FL (USA)
Feb 11, 2017	1	Gazelle	$380,000 Fidelity Investments Grand Prix	CSI5*	Winter Equestrian Festival	Wellington, FL (USA)
Feb 4, 2017	1	Sherkan d'Amaury	$35,000 Suncast 1.50m Championship Jumper Classic	CSI4*	Winter Equestrian Festival	Wellington, FL (USA)

=== 2016 ===
Date	Placing	Horse	Competition	Category	Show	Location
Dec 8, 2016	1	Creedance	Credit Suisse Grand Prix	CSI5*	CHI de Genève	Geneva (SUI)
Nov 12, 2016	1	Creedance	$75,000 GroupBy ‘Big Ben’ Challenge	CSI4* W	Royal Horse Show	Toronto, ON (CAN)
Nov 5, 2016	1	Voyeur	$250,000 Longines FEI World Cup Jumping	CSI4* W	CP National Horse Show	Lexington, KY (USA)
Sept 30, 2016	1	Creedance	$55,000 Champagne Baron de Rothschild Trophy	CSI5*	Longines Masters Of Los Angeles	Los Angeles, CA (USA)
Sept 18, 2016	1	Gazelle	$216,000 Longines FEI World Cup Jumping New York	CSI4* W	American Gold Cup	North Salem, NY (USA)
Sept 4, 2016	1	Creedance	€35,000 Audi Grand Prix	CSI5*	Brussels Stephex Masters	Brussels (BEL)
Aug 28, 2016	1	Creedance	Longines Grand Prix of St. Moritz	CSI5*	St. Moritz	St. Moritz (SUI)
July 9, 2016	1	Gazelle	$500,000 ATCO Queen Elizabeth II Cup	CSI5*	Spruce Meadows	Calgary, AB (CAN)
July 2, 2016	1	Gazelle	$375,000 Pan American Cup	CSI5*	Spruce Meadows	Calgary, AB (CAN)
June 10, 2016	1	Gazelle	ATB Financial Cup 1.55m	CSI5*	Spruce Meadows	Calgary, AB (CAN)
June 10, 2016	1	Aron S	Altagas Cup 1.45m	CSI5*	Spruce Meadows	Calgary, AB (CAN)
June 10, 2016	1	Gazelle	Scotiabank Cup 1.55m	CSI5*	Spruce Meadows	Calgary, AB (CAN)
May 15, 2016	1	Creedance	Grand Prix for the Kingdom of Bahrain Trophy	CSI4*	Rotal Windsor Horse Show	Windsor (ENG)
May 14, 2016	1	Creedance	Kingdom of Bahrain for the King's Cup	CSI4*	Royal Windsor Horse Show	Windsor (ENG)
May 7, 2016	1	Gazelle	Asheville Regional Airport Grand Prix	CSI3*	Tryon Spring 3	Tryon, NC (USA)
May 5, 2016	1	Gazelle	1.50m Suncast Welcome	CSI3*	Tryon Spring 3	Tryon, NC (USA)
Mar 27, 2016	1	Gazelle	Suncast 1.50m Jumper Classic	CSI4*	Winter Equestrian Festival	Wellington, FL (USA
Mar 20, 2016	1	Creedance	Suncast 1.50 Jumper Classic	CSI3*	Winter Equestrian Festival	Wellington, FL (USA
Feb 7, 2016	1	Uceko	FEI World Cup Jumping	CSI3* W	Wellington Masters	Wellington, FL (USA)

=== 2015 ===
Date	Placing	Horse	Competition	Category	Show	Location
Dec 11, 2015	1	Voyeur	Rolex IJRC Top Ten Final	CSI5*	CHI de Genève	Geneva (SUI)
Nov 1, 2015	1	Voyeur	FEI World Cup Jumping	CSI4* W	CP National Horse Show	Lexington, KY (USA)
Oct 29, 2015	1	Willow	CP Grand Prix	CSI4* W	CP National Horse Show	Lexington, KY (USA)
Sep 11, 2015	1	Uceko	Tourmaline Oil Cup	CSIO5*	Spruce Meadows Masters	Calgary, AB (CAN)
Sep 9, 2015	1	Uceko	Akita Drilling Cup	CSIO5*	Spruce Meadows Masters	Calgary, AB (CAN)
Aug 9, 2015	1	Uceko	Longines International Grand Prix of Dublin	CSIO5*	Royal Dublin Horse Show	Dublin (IRL)
Aug 1, 2015	1	Willow	Prix Hôtel Royal Emeraude	CSI5*	Jumping International de Dinard	Dinard (FRA)
Jul 12, 2015	1	Voyeur	Pan American Cup presented by Rolex	CSI5*	Spruce Meadows Pan American	Calgary, AB (CAN)
Jul 3, 2015	1	Uceko	LaFarge Cup	CSI5*	Spruce Meadows North American	Calgary, AB (CAN)
Jun 12, 2015	1	Gazelle	Scotiabank Cup	CSI5*	Spruce Meadows Continental	Calgary, AB (CAN)
Jun 6, 2015	1	Voyeur	RBC Grand Prix presented by Rolex	CSI5*	Spruce Meadows National	Calgary, AB (CAN)
May 21, 2015	1	Waomi	1.50m Jump Off	CSIO5*	Piazza di Siena	Rome (ITA)
May 21, 2015	1	Cha Cha Cha 7	1.45m Two Phase	CSIO5*	Piazza di Siena	Rome (ITA)
May 16, 2015	1	Voyeur	Global Champions Tour Grand Prix of Hamburg	CSI5*	Global Champions Tour Hamburg	Hamburg (GER)
May 14, 2015	1	Belle Fleur 38	1.50m Accumulator	CSI5*	Global Champions Tour Hamburg	Hamburg (GER)
May 10, 2015	1	Blue Angel	Massimo Dutti Trophy	CSI5*	Global Champions Tour Shanghai	Shanghai (CHN)
May 9, 2015	1	Waomi	1.45m/1.50m Speed	CSI5*	Global Champions Tour Shanghai	Shanghai (CHN)
May 8, 2015	1	Blue Angel	1.45m Speed	CSI5*	Global Champions Tour Shanghai	Shanghai (CHN)
Apr 12, 2015	1	Belle Fleur 38	Spring II Grand Prix		Equestrian Sport Productions Spring II	Wellington, FL (USA)
Mar 28, 2015	1	Waomi	Suncast Championship Jumper Series Final	CSI5*	Winter Equestrian Festival	Wellington, FL (USA)
Mar 22, 2015	1	Waomi	Suncast Championship Jumper Classic	CSI4*	Winter Equestrian Festival	Wellington, FL (USA)
Mar 19, 2015	1	Belle Fleur 38	1.45m	CSI4*	Winter Equestrian Festival	Wellington, FL (USA)
Mar 8, 2015	1	Willow	Suncast Championship Jumper Classic	CSI5* W	Winter Equestrian Festival	Wellington, FL (USA)
Feb 22, 2015	1	Waomi	Suncast Championship Jumper Classic	CSI5*	Winter Equestrian Festival	Wellington, FL (USA)
Feb 13, 2015	1	Blue Angel	Salamander Hotels & Resorts Grand Prix	CSI3*	Winter Equestrian Festival	Wellington, FL (USA)

=== 2014 ===
Date	Placing	Horse	Competition	Category	Show	Location
Oct 30, 2014	1	Waomi	Staysail Farm LLC Open Jumper	CSI4* W	National Horse Show	Lexington, KY (USA)
Oct 29, 2014	1	Waomi	Taylor Harris Open Jumper Welcome	CSI4* W	National Horse Show	Lexington, KY (USA)
Oct 16, 2014	1	Willow	Pennsylvania Big Jump	CSI2* W	Pennsylvania National Horse Show	Harrisburg, PA (USA)
Oct 10, 2014	1	Uceko	Longines Cup of the City of Barcelona	CSIO5*	CSIO Barcelona	Barcelona (ESP)
Sep 27, 2014	1	Blue Angel	Battle of the Nations	CSI5*	Longines LA Masters	Los Angeles, CA (USA)
Sep 26, 2014	1	Willow	City of Los Angeles Trophy	CSI5*	Longines LA Masters	Los Angeles, CA (USA)
Sep 11, 2014	1	Blue Angel	Telus Cup	CSIO5*	Spruce Meadows Masters	Calgary, AB (CAN)
Sep 3, 2014	3 (Bronze)	Voyeur	Final Team Classification	WEG-S	World Equestrian Games 2014	Caen (FRA)
Aug 23, 2014	1	Willow	STX Horseboxes Grand Prix	CSI3*	Stephex Masters	Wolvertem (BEL)
Aug 10, 2014	2	Uceko	Longines International Grand Prix of Ireland	CSIO5*	Dublin Horse Show	Dublin (IRL)
Aug 7, 2014	1	Blue Angel	TRI Equestrian Serpentine Speed Stakes	CSIO5*	Dublin Horse Show	Dublin (IRL)
Jul 20, 2014	2	Voyeur	Rolex Grand Prix of Aachen	CSIO5*	CHIO Aachen	Aachen (GER)
Jul 16, 2014	1	Voyeur	Turkish Airlines Preis von Europa	CSIO5*	CHIO Aachen	Aachen (GER)
Jul 13, 2014	1	Uceko	Rolex Pan American Cup	CSI5*	Spruce Meadows Pan American	Calgary, AB (CAN)
Jul 5, 2014	1	Voyeur	Queen Elizabeth II Cup	CSI5*	Spruce Meadows North American	Calgary, AB (CAN)
May 24, 2014	1	Blue Angel	Premio MAG-JLT	CSIO5*	Piazza di Siena	Rome (ITA)
Apr 19, 2014	1	Voyeur	FEI World Cup Jumping Final II	CSI-W	Equita Lyon	Lyon (FRA)
Mar 6, 2014	1	Voyeur	Ruby et Violette WEF Challenge IX	CSI4* W	Winter Equestrian Festival	Wellington, FL (USA)
Feb 14, 2014	1	Blue Angel	Salamander Hotels & Resorts Grand Prix	CSI3*	Winter Equestrian Festival	Wellington, FL (USA)
Jan 5, 2014	1	Blue Angel	Trump Invitational Grand Prix	CSI2*	Mar-a-Lago Club	Palm Beach, FL (USA)

=== 2013 ===
Date	Placing	Horse	Competition	Category	Show	Location
Dec 13, 2013	1	Willow	Credit Suisse Grand Prix	CSI5*	CHI Genève	Geneva (SUI)
Oct 26, 2013	1	Blue Angel	Presidents' Cup	CSI3* W	Washington International Horse Show	Washington, D.C.
Sep 22, 2013	1	Blue Angel	New Albany Grand Prix	CSI2*	New Albany Classic	New Albany, OH (USA)
Sep 7, 2013	1	Blue Angel	Suncor Energy Cup	CSIO5*	Spruce Meadows Masters	Calgary, AB (CAN)
Sep 1, 2013	1	Zafira	FTI Consulting Grand Prix	CSI4* W	Hampton Classic	Bridgehampton, NY (USA)
Jul 28, 2013	1	Voyeur	Gran Premio Telefónica	CSI4*	CSI Casas Novas	A Coruña (ESP)
Jun 16, 2013	1	Uceko	CN Performance Grand Prix	CSIO5* W	Spruce Meadows Continental	Calgary, AB (CAN)
Jun 8, 2013	1	Uceko	CN Reliability Grand Prix	CSI5* W	Spruce Meadows National	Calgary, AB (CAN)
Mar 3, 2013	1	Blue Angel	Wellington Equestrian Realty Grand Prix	CSIO4*	Winter Equestrian Festival	Wellington, FL (USA)
Mar 1, 2013	1 (Gold)	Uceko	FEI Nations Cup	CSIO4*	Winter Equestrian Festival	Wellington, FL (USA)
Jan 6, 2013	1	Dynamo	Trump Invitational Grand Prix	CSI2*	Mar-a-Lago Club	Palm Beach, FL (USA)

=== 2012 ===
Date	Placing	Horse	Competition	Category	Show	Location
Nov 2, 2012	1	Voyeur	Weston Canadian Open	CSI4* W	The Royal Horse Show	Toronto, ON (CAN)
Nov 2, 2012	1	Uceko	Big Ben International Challenge	CSI4* W	The Royal Horse Show	Toronto, ON (CAN)
Oct 20, 2012	1	Uceko	Prix de Penn National	CSI2* W	Pennsylvania National Horse Show	Harrisburg, PA (USA)
Sep 7, 2012	1	Uceko	Encana Cup	CSIO5*	Spruce Meadows Masters	Calgary, AB (CAN)
Sep 2, 2012	1	Voyeur	FTI Grand Prix	CSI4* W	Hampton Classic	Bridgehampton, NY (USA)
Jun 29, 2012	1	Voyeur	Duncan Ross Cup	CSI4* W	Spruce Meadows North American	Calgary, AB (CAN)
Jun 15, 2012	1	Voyeur	Scotiabank Cup	CSI4* W	Spruce Meadows Continental	Calgary, AB (CAN)
Jun 6, 2012	1	Uceko	ATB Financial Cup	CSI5* W	Spruce Meadows National	Calgary, AB (CAN)
Feb 22, 2012	1	Voyeur	WEF Challenge Round VII	CSI3*	Winter Equestrian Festival	Wellington, FL (USA)
Feb 8, 2012	1	Uceko	WEF Challenge Round V	CSI3* W	Winter Equestrian Festival	Wellington, FL (USA)

=== 2011 ===
Date	Placing	Horse	Competition	Category	Show	Location
Nov 2, 2011	1	Up Chiqui	Spy Coast Farm Speed Class	CSI4* W	The National Horse Show	Lexington, KY (USA)
Oct 29, 2011	1 (Gold)	Uceko	Team Championship	Pan-Am S	Pan American Games 2011	Guadalajara (MEX)
Jul 31, 2011	1	Uceko	King George V Gold Cup	CSIO5*	The Royal International Horse Show	Hickstead (GBR)
Jun 8, 2011	1	Uceko	ATB Financial Cup	CSI5*	Spruce Meadows National	Calgary, AB (CAN)
Jun 9, 2011	1	Valhalla	Prairie Mines Cup	CSI5*	Spruce Meadows National	Calgary, AB (CAN)
May 18, 2011	1	Uceko	Hagyard Lexington Classic	CSI2*	Kentucky Horse Park	Lexington, KY (USA)
May 15, 2011	1	Uceko	Commonwealth Grand Prix	CSI2*	Kentucky Horse Park	Lexington, KY (USA)

== International championship results ==
Results
Year	Event	Horse	Placing	Notes
2006	World Cup Final	Madison	33rd	
2008	World Cup Final	Up Chiqui	13th	
2011	Pan American Games	Uceko	1st place, gold medalist(s)	Team
2011	Pan American Games	Uceko	27th	Individual
2012	World Cup Final	Uceko	18th	
2013	World Cup Final	Uceko	26th	
2014	World Cup Final	Blue Angel / Voyeur	29th	
2014	World Equestrian Games	Voyeur	3rd place, bronze medalist(s)	Team
2014	World Equestrian Games	Voyeur	32nd	Individual
2015	Pan American Games	Gazelle	3rd place, bronze medalist(s)	Team
2015	Pan American Games	Gazelle	36th	Individual
2016	Olympic Games	Voyeur	2nd place, silver medalist(s)	Team
2016	Olympic Games	Voyeur	5th	Individual
EL = Eliminated; RET = Retired; WD = Withdrew
