= Anna Power =

British equestrian sportswoman

Personal information
- Full name: Anna Edwards
- Nationality: Great Britain
- Discipline: Show jumping
- Born: 10 April 1984 (age 40); Clevedon

Anna Power (born Anna Edwards) is a British equestrian sportswoman who competes in the sport of show jumping. She is based in Clevedon, North Somerset. In 2010, Edwards won the Queen Elizabeth II Cup and was part of the Great Britain team that won the 2010 FEI Nations Cup of Austria.
