= Horze =

Finnish equestrian products company

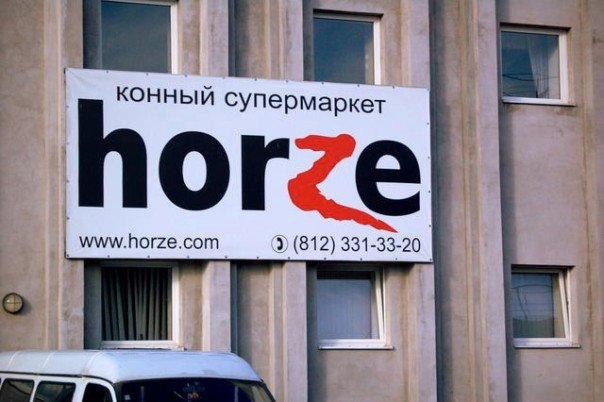
- Horze store outside St. Petersburg
- Type: Private
- Industry: Retail (horse equipment)
- Founded: 1988 in Lahti, Finland
- Headquarters: Hollola, Finland
- Website: horze.com

Horze is a privately owned, initially Finnish equestrian products and supplies retailer. It is one of the biggest European equestrian retailers, having stores in all Scandinavian countries, Germany, France, Hungary, Malaysia and Russia. Horze also runs e-commerce for all countries in the European Union.

== History ==
The Horze riding brand was launched in October 2003 by Oy Finn-Tack Ltd., originally a wholesale supplier of trotting equipment since 1982. In 2004 it opened its first concept stores in St. Petersburg and Lahti, followed by Oslo, Stockholm and Copenhagen. Since then, franchise stores have been added across Europe. The Horze brand also has wholesale distribution in many countries, including Spain, France, UK, Ireland, Greece, Turkey, New Zealand, Australia, Dubai, Poland, Ukraine, Russia, The Netherlands, Hungary and Latvia.

== Sponsorship ==
Horze sponsors both the Finnish and Norwegian international equestrian teams. They also sponsor 24 individual riders from a variety of disciplines and countries in Europe, making up Team Horze. Heading up the team is Danish Show jumping champion, Tina Lund.

== Countries in which Horze operates ==
North America:

- United States
- Canada

South America:

- Argentina
- Mexico

Asia:

- China
- Japan
- India
- Lebanon
- Dubai

Europe:

- Germany
- United Kingdom
- Sweden
- France
- Spain
- Netherlands
- Norway
- Poland
- Denmark
- Italy
- Switzerland
- Austria
- Belgium
- Finland
- Portugal
- Greece
- Hungary
- Russia

.

- Ireland
- Slovenia
- Romania
- Slovakia
- Croatia
- Turkey
- Malta
- Ukraine
- Czech Republic
- Latvia
- Austria
- Slovenia
- Estonia
- Lithuania
- Bulgaria
- Cyprus
- Slovakia
- Liechtenstein

Africa:

- South Africa

Oceania:

- Australia
- New Zealand
