= FEI Nations Cup =

Show jumping series

The FEI Nations Cup, called Longines FEI Nations Cup since 2013 because of sponsorship reasons, is the most prestigious Show Jumping series for national teams in the world. It is organized by the Fédération Équestre Internationale (FEI).

== History ==
The Nations Cup has been held since 1909 and it has been under Fédération Équestre Internationale supervision since 1930.

After World War II it changed names several times: Queen’s Trophy, President’s Cup and Prince Philip Trophy. In 1987 the tournament established its first commercial sponsor and was named Gucci Trophy after Italian fashion and leather goods brand Gucci. It was followed by the Dutch technological brand HCS in 1990, and changed again in 1997 when Samsung overtook sponsorship. The Cup was named Samsung Nations Cup from 1997 to 2002 and Samsung Super League between 2003 and 2008. In 2009 and 2010 the Nations Cup series was sponsored by the Meydan Group (the builder of the Meydan Racecourse in Dubai) and called Meydan FEI Nations Cup. In 2011 and 2012 commercial sponsorship was dropped and it was called only FEI Nations Cup, to retake a commercial name in 2013 as Furusiyya FEI Nations Cup.

=== 2009–2012 ===
Between 2009 and 2012 it consisted of the Top League and the Promotional League. In the Top League, each of the ten participating teams consisted of four riders who rode the first course. The riders of the eight best-placed participating teams (after the first round) rode the second course. Each team's lowest score for each round was dropped. Teams scored points for their placings in each event. There was no Final event, and the two teams with the lowest score at the end of the series were to be relegated to the Promotional League, while the two best-placed teams in the Promotional League Final would start in the Meydan FEI Nations Cup of the next season.

After the 2009 season, Belgium and Great Britain were both tied for eighth place in the final ranking. The rule book had no answer for this situation. The FEI decided that Belgium, Great Britain and the tenth-placed team, Italy, had to be relegated to the 2010 FEI Nations Cup Promotional League. The British Equestrian Federation went to court because of this decision and the Court of Arbitration for Sport (CAS) allowed the appeal of the British Equestrian Federation and, after all, only Belgium and Italy were relegated.

After the 2009 season the rule book was changed: in 2010 teams from ten nations (projected: nine nations, see CAS decision) competing in the Meydan FEI Nations Cup; starting with the 2011 season eight teams would compete in the Meydan FEI Nations Cup. So at the end of the 2010 season, four teams were relegated to the 2011 FEI Nations Cup Promotional League.

| Year | Winning team | Relegated teams |
|---|---|---|
| 2009 | France | Belgium, Italy, (United Kingdom) Great Britain* |
| 2010 | France | Spain, Sweden, Switzerland, Poland |
| 2011 | Germany | Netherlands, United Kingdom |
| 2012 | Germany | France, Ireland |

* (United Kingdom) Great Britain was not relegated, see CAS decision

=== 2013–present ===
The Furusiyya FEI Nations Cup no longer has a Top League and a Promotional League. Instead, there are seven groups: Europe I, Europe II, North and Central America, South America, Near East, Asia/Australasia, and Africa. The best 18 teams compete in a final event in Barcelona, Spain.

| Year | Winner | Runner-up | Third |
|---|---|---|---|
| 2013 | France | Brazil | Ireland |
| 2014 | Netherlands | Canada | Sweden |
| 2015 | Belgium | Great Britain | Netherlands |
| 2016 | Germany | Great Britain | France |
| 2017 | Netherlands | United States | Belgium |
| 2018 | Belgium | France | Ireland |
| 2019 | Ireland | Belgium | Sweden |
| 2021 | Netherlands | Ireland | Belgium |
| 2022 | Belgium | France | Switzerland |
