= Dawid Kubiak =

Polish equestrian

Personal information
- Born: 4 May 1987 (age 39) Tomaszów Mazowiecki, Poland

Sport
- Country: Poland
- Sport: Equestrian
- Event: Show jumping

Dawid Kubiak (born 4 May 1987 in Tomaszów Mazowiecki, Poland) is a Polish equestrian. Kubiak represented the Polish show-jumping team at the 2024 Summer Olympics in Paris, where he finished 42nd in the individual competition. He was initially the traveling reserve but replaced Michał Tyszko, while his horse was not fit to compete.
