= Hanoverian =

The adjective Hanoverian is used to describe:

- British monarchs or supporters of the House of Hanover, the dynasty which ruled the United Kingdom from 1714 to 1901
- things relating to;
  - Electorate of Hanover
  - Kingdom of Hanover
  - Province of Hanover
- things relating to the City of Hanover, Germany
- Hanoverian horse, a horse breed
