= 2009 Meydan FEI Nations Cup =

The 2009 Meydan FEI Nations Cup was the 2009 edition of the FEI Nations Cup, a premier international team Grand Prix show jumping competition run by the FEI and sponsored for the first time by the Meydan Group from Dubai. It was held at eight European venues from May 15 to August 17, 2009. After one year in the (old) FEI Nations Cup the team of France won the series in 2009.

== 2009 show schedule ==
Date	Show	Winning team
May 15, 2009	Jumping International de France 2009; La Baule, France; CSIO***** €200,000	Switzerland
May 29, 2009	Piazza di Siena 2009 (Italy) Rome, Italy; CSIO***** €200,000	United States
June 5, 2009	CSIO Schweiz 2009 (Switzerland) St. Gallen, Switzerland; CSIO***** €200,000	United States
June 19, 2009	CHIO Rotterdam 2009 (Netherlands) Rotterdam, Netherlands; CSIO***** €200,000	France
July 2, 2009	CHIO Aachen 2009 (Germany) Aachen, Germany; CSIO***** €200,000	France
July 17, 2009	Falsterbo Horse Show 2009 (Sweden) Skanör med Falsterbo, Sweden; CSIO***** €200,000	Ireland
July 24, 2009	2009 Longines Royal International Horse Show (United Kingdom) Hickstead, United Kingdom; CSIO***** €200,000	Germany
August 7, 2009	2009 Dublin Horse Show (Republic of Ireland) Dublin, Ireland; CSIO***** €200,000	Italy

== Overall standings ==
	Team	Points								Total
	Team	FRA (France)	ITA (Italy)	SUI (Switzerland)	NED (Netherlands)	GER (Germany)	SWE (Sweden)	GBR (United Kingdom)	IRL (Republic of Ireland)	Total
1	France	4	7	0	10	10	5.5	7	4.5	48.0
2	United States	2	10	10	7	5	2	3.5	4.5	44.0
3	Germany	5.5	4	7	2	6.5	1	10	3	39.0
4	Switzerland	10	5.5	5.5	0	2	5.5	0	6.5	35.0
5	Netherlands	5.5	2.5	3.5	6	6.5	3.5	1	0	28.5
5	Ireland	0	2.5	1	4	4	10	6	1	28.5
7	Sweden	7	0	0	3	1	7	5	0	23.0
8	(United Kingdom) Great Britain	0	5.5	3.5	1	0	3.5	2	6.5	22.0
8	Belgium	3	0	5.5	5	3	0	3.5	2	22.0
10	Italy	1	1	2	0	0	0	0	10	14.0

After the 2009 season Belgium and Great Britain both are tied on the eight place in final ranking. The rule book have no rule for this situation. The FEI decided, that Belgium, Great Britain and the tenth-placed team from Italy are relegated to the 2010 FEI Nations Cup Promotional League. The Great Britain Federation going to court because of this decision. In follow of this the Court of Arbitration for Sport (CAS) has allowed the appeal of the British Equestrian Federation. So ten teams are allowed to start in the 2010 Meydan FEI Nations Cup.
