= Tina Lund =

Danish equestrian (born 1981)

Tina Lund (born 1981 in) is a Danish professional equestrian (show jumper) living in Skævinge, Nordsjælland in Denmark.

Tina Lund is 19 times Danish Champion, three times Nordic Champion, and one time European Champion for "young riders" (riders under the age of 21). She was also the most winning Danish rider in 2006, and today the only rider to win the Nordic championship, Danish Championship and the European Championship in the same year. She is daughter of the former soccer player Flemming Lund. Lund lives at Stutteri Lyngsholm in Nordsjælland training the family's competition horses. She is engaged to former professional soccer player (wedding is planned to be held in Næstved 20 August 2011) Allan Nielsen.

Besides her achievements in sports, she has become a national celebrity, appearing in national television, in a number of reality TV shows, posing semi-nude in a men's magazine, she has released a pop single (singer) and regularly appears in mainstream gossip magazines.

Lund had her first pony when she was nine years old. It was a little grey category 3 pony, who was named Bolli. Tina Lund started with show jumping at the age of ten years, and holds a place in the Guinness World Records as the youngest Danish Champion (11 yrs) ever.

Lund has also won two world cup qualifications; Mechelen in 2004 and Vigo in 2005 on the horse Andante as the first Danish rider, this qualified her for the World Cup final in Las Vegas 2005. She is sponsored by equestrian equipment and apparel company, Horze.

Other achievements:

- Sports name of the year in Denmark 2002
- Danish Champion for senior riders on the horse Lanthanid 2005 og 2006. In 2007, she won on the horse Zamiro
- Lund finished her education at Handelsskolen in Hillerød 2002.
- In 2009, she was named by the Danish gossip magazine Se og Hør as Denmark's most lovely woman
- In October 2009 she performed for the first time as a singer with her first single at the Bavian Rock Show in Copenhagen
- In 2009, she got her own national TV show (series of 4 programs) broadcast on the Danish channel "TV2". The show was a great success and had on average more than 600.000 viewers (very good in a small country as Denmark). The show was called "Tina Lund – Tæt på" (translated to English: Tina Lund – Close up).

Lund had her breakthrough as a celebrity in Denmark when she was pictured with little clothes in the man-magazine "M". After that she was invited to dance in the Danish version of "Dancing with the stars" (she came 2nd), and also some other popular reality shows in Denmark.

On 5 October 2009 she released her first single "Take a Ride", as according to her was meant as a tribute to all the horse-girls. Critics labelled it plain mainstream pop.
