= Samsung Super League =

The Samsung Super League was the commercial denomination of the Nations Cup, one of the most prestigious Grand Prix Show Jumping series in the world, from 2003 until 2008.

The Samsung Super League was sponsored by Samsung Electronics and organized by the Fédération Équestre Internationale (FEI). Teams from eight nations competed on a rotating basis. The team with the lowest score at the end of the series was relegated, and the highest ranking Nations Cup team was given the opportunity to take their place.

== Competition ==
This series consisted of eight events in eight European countries. Each of the eight participating teams consisted of four riders who rode the course twice. Each team's lowest score for each round was dropped. Teams scored points for their placings in each event, with the final event in Barcelona counting double.

== History ==
Samsung first became a sponsor of FEI show jumping competition in 1988. The first Super League series took place in 2003. Samsung's involvement with FEI show jumping ended after the 2008 super league season.

Year	Winning team	Relegated team	Top rider
2003	France	Sweden	
2004	France	Italy	
2005	United States	Belgium	
2006	Germany	Ireland	(France) Stephane Lafouge
2007	Germany	France	(Germany) Marcus Ehning
2008	Germany	Sweden	(Germany) Ludger Beerbaum
