= Morten Djupvik =

Norwegian show jumping competitor

Personal information
- Nationality: Norwegian
- Discipline: Show jumping
- Born: 27 April 1972 (age 52); Drammen, Norway

Morten Djupvik (born 27 April 1972) is a Norwegian show jumping competitor.

At the 2008 Summer Olympics in Beijing, Djupvik originally won the bronze medal as part of the Norwegian team in team jumping, together with Stein Endresen, Geir Gulliksen, and Tony Andre Hansen. However, the team lost its medal and finished tenth following the disqualification of Tony Andre Hansen.
