= Stein Endresen =

Norwegian show jumping competitor

Stein Endresen (born 4 October 1959) is a Norwegian show jumping competitor.

At the 2008 Summer Olympics in Beijing, Endresen originally won the bronze medal as part of the Norwegian team in team jumping, together with Morten Djupvik, Geir Gulliksen, and Tony Andre Hansen. However the Norwegian team lost its bronze medal and finished tenth following the disqualification of Tony Andre Hansen.
