= Geir Gulliksen =

Norwegian show jumping competitor

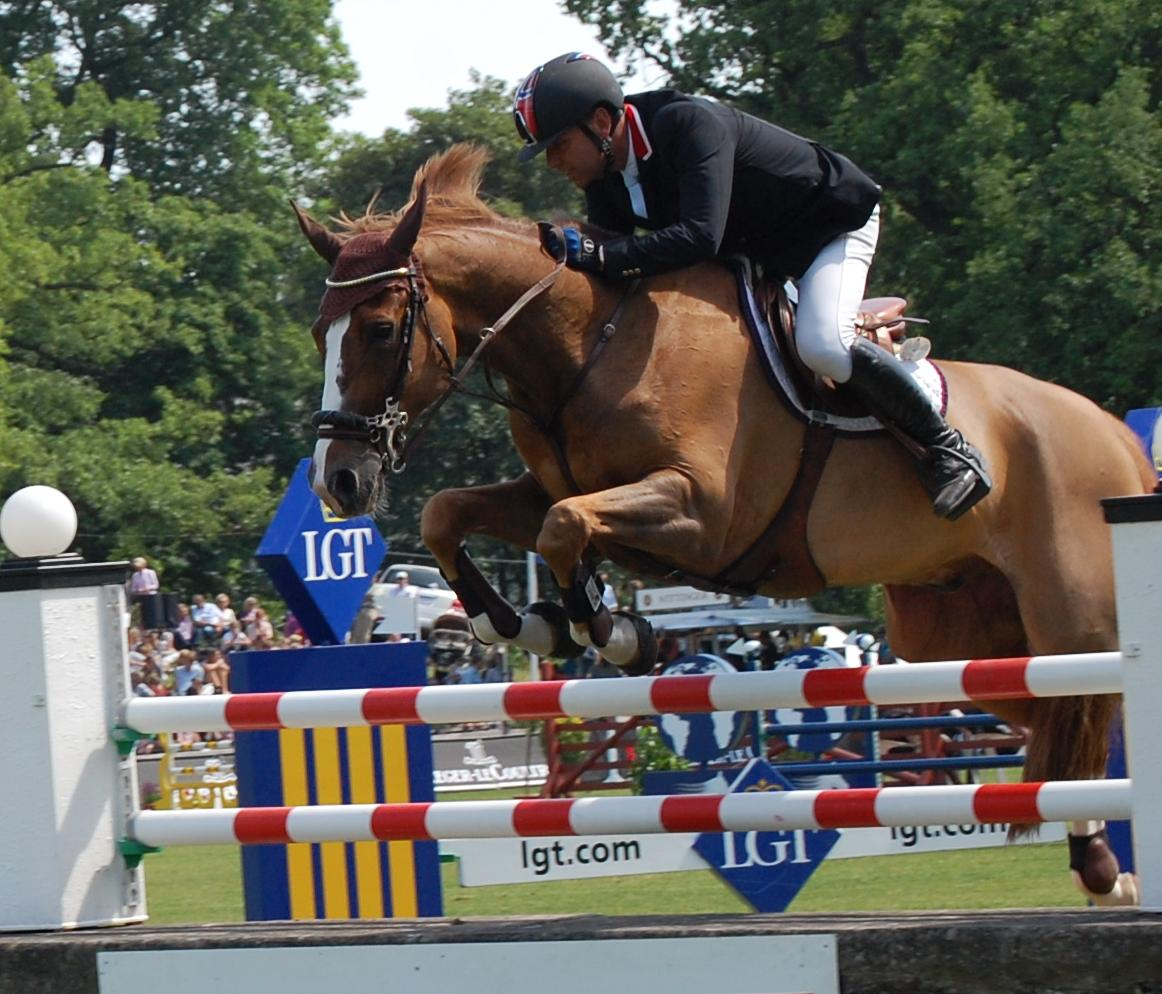
Geir Gulliksen with L'Espoir, CSI 5* Hamburg

Geir Gulliksen (born 9 January 1960) is a Norwegian show jumping competitor.

At the 2008 Summer Olympics in Beijing, Gulliksen originally won the bronze medal as part of the Norwegian team in team jumping, together with Morten Djupvik, Stein Endresen, and Tony Andre Hansen. However, the Norwegian team lost its bronze medal and finished tenth following the disqualification of Tony Andre Hansen.
